= Lucius =

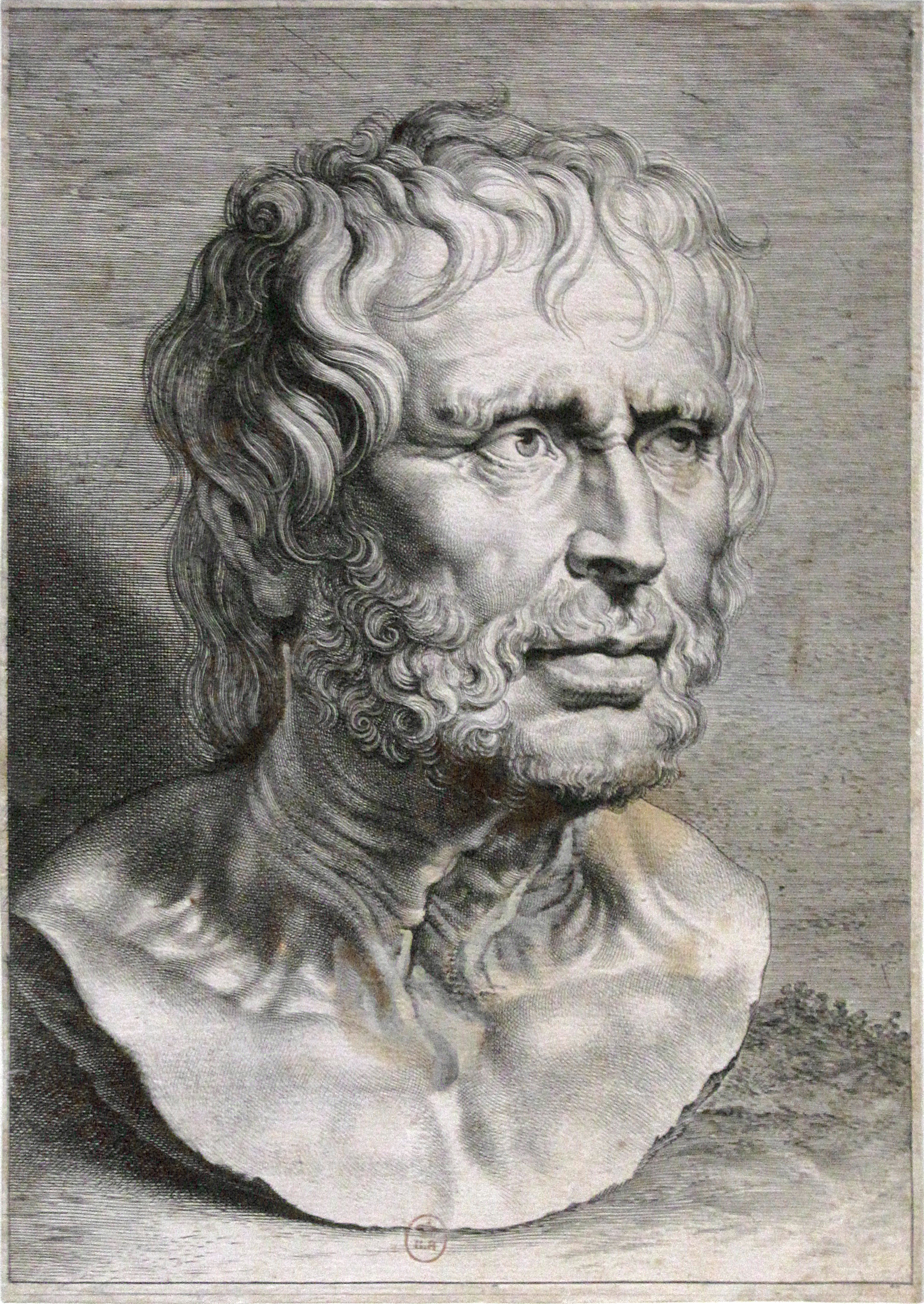
- Lucius Annaeus Seneca
- Pronunciation: /ˈluːʃəs/, /ˈljuːsiəs/
- Gender: Masculine

Origin
- Language: Latin
- Meaning: Light
- Region of origin: Ancient Rome

Other names
- Variant form: Lucia
- Derivatives: Cindy, Loukas, Luc, Luca (masculine given name and surname), Lucas (given name and surname), Lucca, Lucci, Lucette, Lucey, Luci, Lucian, Luciana, Luciano, Lučić, Lucie, Lucien, Lucija, Lūcija, Lucile, Lucille, Lucinda, Lucio, Lucioni, Lucy, Lukas, Łukasz, Luke (given name and surname), Luzia
- Derived: Praenomen Lucius, Loukjos, louks + -jos
- Related names: Lucaj, Lucchi, Lucchini, Luce, Lucifer, Luka, Lusk, Luz, Luzi, Rukmini

Lucius is a masculine given name derived from Lucius (Latin [ˈluː.ki.us]; Etruscan: Luvcie), abbreviated L., one of the small group of common Latin forenames (praenomina) found in the culture of ancient Rome. Lucius probably derives from Latin word lux (gen. lucis), meaning "light" (<PIE *leuk-, "brightness"), related to the Latin verb lucere ("to shine") and cognate to the name Lucas. Another proposed etymology is derivation from Etruscan Lauchum (or Lauchme) meaning "king", which was more directly transferred into Latin as Lucumo.

Lucia and Lucy are feminine forms of the name.

In addition, Lucius is an English masculine given name and an Austrian, German, Luxembourgish and Dutch surname. Lucius has been translated into Italian, Spanish and Portuguese, as Lucio. Derived from the related patronymic Lucianus is Luciano in Italian, Spanish and Portuguese, Lucien in French and Luken in Basque.

== Given name ==
In Antiquity or earlier

- Lucius Tarquinius Priscus, legendary king of Rome from 616 BC to 579 BC
- Lucius Tarquinius Superbus, seventh king of Rome from 535–509 BC
- Lucius Quinctius Cincinnatus (520 BC–430 BC), Roman aristocrat
- Lucius Caecilius Metellus Denter, Roman consul and praetor 285–4 BC
- Lucius Postumius Megellus (consul 262 BC), Roman general, politician and consul (262 BC)
- Lucius Manlius Vulso Longus, Roman general, statesman, and consul (in 256 and 250 BC)
- Lucius Caecilius Metellus (consul 251 BC), Roman consul (251 BC), pontifex maximus and dictator
- Lucius Cornelius Scipio Asiaticus (228 BC-183 BC), Roman general and statesman
- Lucius Marcius Censorinus, Roman consul in 149 BC and censor in 147 BC
- Lucius Cornelius Sulla Felix (138 BC–78 BC), Roman consul and dictator
- Lucius Licinius Lucullus (118 BC–56 BC), Roman general and statesman
- Lucius Domitius Ahenobarbus (98 BC–48 BC), Roman general, politician, and consul
- Lucius Septimius, assassin of Pompey
- Lucius Pinarius, 1st century BC Roman governor
- Lucius Caesar (17 BC–AD 2), grandson to Augustus
- Lucius Annaeus Seneca the Younger c.4 BC – AD 65; aka Seneca; Stoic
- Lucius of Cyrene, Roman church founder according to Acts of the Apostles
- Lucius Calvenus Taurus, 2nd century Middle Platonist philosopher
- Lucius Verus (130–169), Roman emperor
- Lucius of Britain, a legendary 2nd century Christian king
- Lucius Domitius Aurelianus (215-275), Roman Emperor
- Lucius Aurelius Marcianus, 3rd century Roman general
- Lucius of Alexandria, a 4th century Patriarch of Alexandria
- Lucius of Chur, legendary first bishop of Chur
- Lucius (consul 413), Roman politician

Popes

- Pope Lucius I (200–254)
- Pope Lucius II (died 1145)
- Pope Lucius III (1100–1185)

Various 18th to 21st century figures

- Lucius Cary (disambiguation) Scottish family; Viscount Falkland
- Lucius Ferraris (died 1763) Italian Franciscan canonist
- Lucius O'Brien (1731–1795), Irish politician
- Lucius Gwynn (1873–1902), Irish cricketer
- Lucius Curtis (1786–1869), British admiral
- Lucius Trant O'Shea (1858-1920), British chemist and mining engineer
- Lucius Kelly (1858–1932), Canadian politician
- David Lucius King, a performer in the English family hip pop quintet King

American 18th to 21st century figures

- Lucius Elmer (1793–1883), American politician
- Lucius Quintus Cincinnatus Lamar (I) (1797–1834), American lawyer
- Lucius Lyon (1800–1851), American politician
- Lucius V. Bierce (1801–1876), American politician and military officer
- Lucius Junius Polk (1802–1870), American politician
- Lucius Robinson (1810–1891), American lawyer and politician
- Lucius Jacques Dupré (1822–1869), American politician
- Lucius Quintus Cincinnatus Lamar (II) (1825–1893), American politician and judge
- Lucius Fairchild (1831–1896), American politician and general
- Lucius Nieman (1857–1935), American journalist
- Lucius Littauer (1859–1944), American politician
- Lucius Henderson (1861–1947), American film director
- Lucius D. Clay (1897–1978), American general
- Lucius Beebe (1902–1966), American writer
- Lucius Holsey Pitts (1915–1974), American college president and Black educational leader
- Lucius Shepard (1943–2014), American writer
- Lucius Allen (born 1947), American basketball player
- Lucius Davis (born 1970), American basketball player
- Lucius Borich (born 1971), Australian musician

=== Fictional characters ===
- Lucius, character in the Apuleius novel The Golden Ass
- Lucius Tiberius, Roman emperor in Arthurian literature
- Lucius, character in the play Julius Caesar by William Shakespeare
- Lucius, character in the play Titus Andronicus by William Shakespeare
- Lucius, character, played by Mike Epps, in the 2003 film The Fighting Temptations
- Lucius, character in the PlayStation 3 game Trinity Universe
- Lucius, character, played by Michael Clarke Duncan, in the 2006 film Talladega Nights: The Ballad of Ricky Bobby
- Lucius, character, played by Ron Randell, in the 1961 film King of Kings
- Lucius Best, also known as Frozone, a character in the 2004 Disney/Pixar animated film The Incredibles
- Lucius Brockway, character in the Ralph Ellison novel Invisible Man
- Lucius Down, character in the Jeff Smith comic Bone
- Lucius Faversham, character in the radio comedy The Penny Dreadfuls Present...
- Lucius Fox, character in the Batman comic books and movies
- Lucius Hunt, character in the 2004 film The Village by M. Night Shyamalan
- Lucius Lavin, character in the television series Stargate Atlantis
- Lucius Malfoy, character in J.K. Rowling's Harry Potter series
- Lucius Provine, character in the William Faulkner short story A Bear Hunt
- Lucius Quick, character in the William Faulkner novel The Reivers
- Lucius the Eternal, character in the Warhammer 40,000 universe
- Lucius Vorenus, character in the television series Rome
- Lucius Wagner, character in the video game Lucius
- Lucious Lyon, character in Empire (2015 TV series)
- Lucius, character in Fire Emblem: The Blazing Blade
- Lucius, character in the movie Gladiator (2000 film)
- Lucius Zogratis, character in the manga Black Clover
- Lucius Artorius Castus, character in the manga Vinland Saga
- Lucius, character in the manga Thermae Romae

== Surname ==
- Chaz Lucius (born 2003), American ice hockey player
- Hanibal Lucić (1485–1553), Croatian poet and playwright
- Johannes Lucius (1604–1679), Venetian Dalmatian historian
- Theo Lucius (born 1976), Dutch football player

== See also ==
- Lucius (praenomen)
- Saint Lucius (disambiguation)
- Lucious, given name
- Luscious (disambiguation)
