= Luci =

- Pronunciation: /ˈluːsi/ LOO-see; Italian: [ˈluːtʃi]
- Gender: Female

Origin
- Origin: Latin
- Meaning: Light
- Region of origin: Ancient Rome

Other names
- Related names: Lucy, Luce, Lucia, Lucio, Lucius, Lucile, Lucey, Luciana, Luciano, Lucinda, Luca
- Popularity: see popular names

Luci is an English feminine given name variant of Lucy and an Italian surname derived from the Latin personal name Lucius (from Latin Lux, genitive Lucis, meaning "light"). Luci is also an ancient Norman territorial surname derived from the village of Lucé (Normandy, France) arrived in England after the Norman Conquest that originated various English surnames: Luce, Lucy, Lucey. Alternative spellings and related names are: Lucia, Lucie, Lucile, Lucien, Lucey, Lucci, Luce, Lucy, Luzi.

Luci may refer to:

== People ==
=== Given name ===
- Luci (footballer), Spanish football manager and former footballer Luciano Martín Toscano (born 1972)
- Luci Baines Johnson (born 1947), younger daughter of U.S. President Lyndon Johnson
- Luci Christian (born 1973), American voice actress working with ADV Films and FUNimation
- Luci Pollreis, Austrian Righteous among the Nations
- Luci Romberg, American stuntwoman
- Luci Shaw (born 1928), English poet living in the United States
- Luci Tapahonso (born 1953), American poet
- Luci van Org, (born 1971), German musician, writer and actress
- Luci Victoria (born 1982), English model and actress

=== Surname ===
- de Luci, Anglo-Norman family
- Andrea Luci (born 1985), Italian footballer
- Anthony de Luci (1283–1343), Chief Justiciar of Ireland in 1331
- Cassandra Luci (1785–1863), Italian Princess Poniatowski
- Giovanni Luci (Johannes Lucius; 1604–1679), Dalmatian historian
- Godfrey de Luci (died 1204), Norman bishop of Winchester
- Luciano Luci (born 1949), Italian referee
- Luzio Luzi (16th century), Italian painter of the late Renaissance/Mannerism era born in Todi
- Mari-Luci Jaramillo (1928–2019), American-born U.S. ambassador to Honduras
- Richard de Luci (1089–1179), Norman baron, sheriff of Essex and Chief Justiciar of England
- Walter de Luci (1103 or 1091 – 1171), Norman monk, abbot of Battle Abbey

== Fictional characters ==
- Luci, a female character in Barney and the Backyard Gang and Barney and Friends

== See also ==
- Luce (name)
- Lucey
- Luci (disambiguation)
- Lucia (disambiguation) or Lúcia
- Luciana (disambiguation)
- Lucie
- Lucifer (disambiguation)
- Lucile (disambiguation) or Lucille (disambiguation)
- Lucinda (given name)
- Lucini (disambiguation)
- Lucioni
- Lucy
- Lusi (disambiguation)
- Luzi
