= Lucie =

- Pronunciation: English: /ˈluːsiː/ LOO-see; French: [lysi]; Czech: [ˈlut͡sɪjɛ]
- Gender: Female

Origin
- Origin: Latin
- Meaning: Light
- Region of origin: Ancient Rome

Other names
- Related names: Lucy, Luci, Luce, Lucia, Lucey, Lucio, Lucile, Luciana, Luciano, Lucinda, Luca
- Popularity: see popular names

Lucie is the French and Czech form of the female name Lucia. It is also a nickname or hypocorism. It may refer to:

== People ==
- Lucie Ahl (born 1974), British tennis player
- Lucie Arnaz (born 1951), American actress
- Lucie Aubrac (1912–2007), member of the French Resistance
- Lucie Bakešová (1853–1935), Czech folklorist and social activist
- Lucie Balthazar (born 1958), Canadian handball player
- Lucie Barbier (née Hirsch, also known as Lucie Zimmern; 1875–1963), French pianist and singer
- Lucie Baud (1870–1913), French trade unionist and silk worker
- Lucie Berger (1836–1906), French pioneer in the education of girls in France
- Lucie Bertaud (born 1985), French boxer and mixed martial arts fighter
- Lucie Bílá (born 1966), Czech pop singer
- Lucie Böhm (born 1974), Austrian orienteer
- Lucie Boissonnas (1839–1877), French writer
- Lucie Brock-Broido, American poet
- Lucie Campbell (1885–1963), American composer and director of gospel music
- Lucie Cave (born 1972), British journalist
- Lucie Charlebois, Canadian politician
- Lucie Daouphars (1922–1963), French model known as Lucky
- Lucie de la Falaise (born 1973), Welsh-born French former model and socialite
- Lucie Décosse, French judoka
- Lucie Dejardin, Belgian politician
- Lucie Delarue-Mardrus, French writer
- Lucie Dreyfus (1869–1945), wife of Alfred Dreyfus, a Jewish French Army officer wrongfully convicted of espionage, later exonerated
- Lucie Edwards, Canadian diplomat
- Lucie Grange, French medium, newspaper editor
- Lucie Granier (born 1999), French handball player
- Lucinda Lucie Green (born 1975), British astrophysicist
- Lucie Guay, Canadian sprint canoer
- Lucie Hammecke (born 1996), German politician
- Lucie Havlickova, Czech tennis player
- Lucie Höflich (1883–1956), German actress
- Lucie Hradecká, Czech tennis player
- Lucie Ingemann (1792–1868), Danish painter
- Lucie Jones (born 1991), Welsh singer
- Lucie Kamuswekera (born 1944), Congolese textile artist
- Lucie Králová, Czech female model
- Lucie Krausová, Czech figure skater
- Lucie Lagerbielke (1865–1931), Swedish writer and painter
- Lucie Lamoureux-Bruneau, Canadian politician
- Lucie Laurier, Canadian actress
- Lucie, Lady Duff-Gordon, English writer
- Lucie Leblanc, Canadian politician
- Lucie Leiciague (1880–1962), French communist
- Lucie M'ba, Gabonese politician
- Lucie Mannheim (1899–1976), German actress
- Lucie Martínková (born 1986), Czech former footballer
- Lucie Myslivečková, Czech ice dancer
- Lucie Nguyen Tan (born 2003), French tennis player
- Lucie Oršulová, Czech ski mountaineer
- Lucie Paul-Margueritte, French writer, translator
- Lucie Paus Falck, Norwegian politician
- Lucie Pépin, Canadian politician
- Lucie Pohl (born 1987), German-American actress and comedian
- Lucie Randoin (1888–1960), French biologist, nutritionist, expert in dietary significance of vitamins
- Lucie Rie (1902–1995), British studio potter
- Lucie Salhany, American media executive
- Lucie Šafářová (born 1987), Czech tennis player
- Lucie Schoonheere (born 2010), French skateboarder
- Lucie Shorthouse, English actress
- Lucie Silverman (born 1977), also known as Lucie Silvas, British singer-songwriter
- Lucie Talmanová, Czech politician
- Lucie Tiger, Australian country music singer, songwriter, and musician
- Lucie Blue Tremblay (born 1958), Canadian singer-songwriter
- Lucie Vondráčková, Czech actress and singer
- Lucie Wolf (1833–1902), Norwegian stage actress
- Lucie Zhang (born 2000), French actress

== Fictional characters ==
- Lucie Jurin, in the 2008 horror film Martyrs
- Lucie Manette, in Charles Dickens' novel A Tale of Two Cities
- Lucie Miller, in Doctor Who

== See also ==
- Luci
- Lucia (disambiguation)
- Lucy
- Lucey
