= Lucey =

- Gender: Female

Origin
- Origin: Latin or Old Gaelic
- Meaning: Light
- Region of origin: Ancient Rome

Other names
- Related names: Lucy, Luci, Lucette, Lucia, Lucio, Lucile, Lucey, Luciana, Luciano, Lucinda, Luca
- Popularity: see popular names

Lucey is an Irish, British, American and Canadian surname. Lucey has two distinct possible origins: of Norman origins derived from Latin personal name Lucius; of Gaelic origins derived from Old Gaelic Ó Luasaigh, anciently Mac Cluasaigh. Alternative spellings are: Lucie, Luci, Luce. Lucey is also a toponomastic name in France.

Lucey may refer to the following people:

- Cornelius Lucey (1902–1982), Irish Catholic bishop
- Donna Lucey, American writer
- Dorothy Lucey (born 1958), American entertainment reporter
- George Kenneth Lucey Jr. (born 1937), American engineer
- Harry Lucey (1913–1984), American comics artist, primary artist of Archie comics
- Joe Lucey (1897–1980), American Major League Baseball infielder/pitcher
- Patrick Lucey (1918–2014), American politician, governor of Wisconsin
- Patrick J. Lucey (Illinois lawyer) (1871–1947), American politician
- Robert Emmet Lucey (1891–1977), American Roman Catholic archbishop
- Roger Lucey, South African musician, journalist, film maker
- Stephen Lucey (born 1980), Irish sportsperson

== See also ==
- Luce (name)
- Lucy
- Luci
- Lucie
- De Lucy
