= Lucienne =

Lucienne is a given French name. It is the feminine form of Lucien, meaning "Light". Variants include Lucinda, Lucie (French) and Lucy. People named Lucienne include:

- Lucienne Abraham, French Trotskyist politician
- Lucienne Bisson, French painter
- Lucienne Bloch, Switzerland-born American artist, sculptor and photographer
- Lucienne Boyer, French singer
- Lucienne Day, British textile designer
- Lucienne Delyle, French singer
- Lucienne Heuvelmans, French sculptor and illustrator
- Lucienne Filippi, French painter
- Lucienne N'Da, Ivorian athletic competitor
- Lucienne Robillard, Canadian politician and a member of the Liberal Party of Canada
- Lucienne "Lucy" Rokach, English professional poker player from Stoke-on-Trent

== See also ==
- Lucianne Goldberg
- AMD Lucienne, an Accelerated Processing Unit (APU) series by AMD
