= Lūcija =

Lūcija is a feminine given name found in Latvia.

Notable people with the name include:

- Lūcija Garūta (1902–1977), Latvian pianist, poet and composer
- Lūcija Jēruma-Krastiņa (1899–1968), Latvian anatomist and anthropologist

== See also ==
- Lucija
- Lucia (name)
