= De Lucy =

Norman noble family surname

de Lucy or de Luci (alternate spellings: Lucey, Lucie, Luce, Luci) is the surname of an old Norman noble family originating from Lucé in Normandy, one of the great baronial Anglo-Norman families which became rooted in England after the Norman Conquest. The first records are about Adrian de Luci (born about 1064 in Lucé, Normandy, France) who went into England after William the Conqueror. The rise of this family might have been due to Henry I of England, although there are no historical proofs that all de Lucys belonged to the same family.

The canting arms of the Anglo-Norman de Luci family display three lucy (luce, or pike, Esox lucius)

== Notable members ==
=== Richard de Lucy ===
Richard de Lucy (c. 1089–14 July 1179) was Sheriff of the County of Essex, Chief Justiciar of England and excommunicated by Thomas Becket in 1166 and 1169. He married Rohese, who might have been a sister of Faramus of Boulogne.

=== Walter de Luci ===
Walter de Luci (also Walter de Lucy) was brother of Richard de Lucy. He was a monk at Lonlay-l'Abbaye in Normandy, then was elected Abbot of Battle Abbey in Sussex, England. He died while still abbot on 21 June 1171.

=== Godfrey de Lucy ===
Godfrey de Lucy (c. 1124– 11 September 1204) was son of Richard de Lucy. He was nominated Archdeacon of Derby, and Bishop of Winchester.

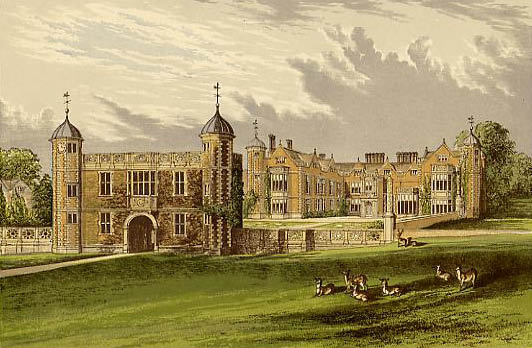
Charlecote Park circa 1880

=== Reginald de Lucy ===
Reginald de Lucy also known as Reynold was an itinerant judge in the Counties of Nottingham and Derby in 1173. He was governor of Nottingham. He had a son, Richard, who succeeded him. He was probably another son of Richard de Lucy.

=== Robert de Lucy ===
Robert de Lucy was sheriff of the County of Worcester in 1175. He was the brother of Richard de Lucy, the Chief Justiciar of England.

=== Stephen de Luci ===
Stephen de Luci (13th century), one of the sons of Walter de Charlecote, the first with his brother William de Luci to use the surname Luci. His brother, William de Luci, was the ancestor of Thomas de Luci (also known as Thomas Lucy de Charlecotte). Stephen de Luci was nominated one of the justice itinerants by Henry III of England in 1228.

=== Anthony de Lucy, 1st Baron Lucy of Cockermouth ===
Anthony de Lucy (1283– 10 June 1343) fought at the Battle of Bannockburn, 1314, under Lord Clifford; became Warden of the West March in 1318; arrested and put on trial Andrew Harclay, 1st Earl of Carlisle, 1323, and was made Lord of Cockermouth in that year; made Chief Justiciar of Ireland in 1331; was keeper of Berwick and justiciar of English-held Scotland, 1334–37. The "predominant magnate in the far North-West, superseding the Cliffords..."

=== Anthony de Lucy, 3rd Baron Lucy ===
Anthony de Lucy, 3rd Baron Lucy was the second son of Thomas de Lucy, 2nd Baron Lucy (died 1365) and grandson of the Anthony de Lucy mentioned above. He was born around 1332/33, and was probably killed in 1368, at New Kaunas, Lithuania, while on crusade fighting for the Teutonic Knights. It is widely accepted that the well-preserved body of a knight found at St Bees Priory is that of Anthony de Lucy, known, prior to his identification, as St Bees Man.

=== Thomas Lucy de Charlecote ===
Sir Thomas Lucy (24 April 1532 – 7 July 1600) was a magistrate and an evangelical living in Charlecote near Stratford-on-Avon, Warwickshire. He persecuted recusant Catholic families in the area, including William Shakespeare's maternal relatives. He assumed the surname Lucy, probably descended from the Norman de Luci family by his mother's line.

== See also ==
- Baron Lucy
- Duchy of Normandy and the Norman conquest of England
- Charlecote Park

== Bibliography ==
- Charles Wareing Endell Bardsley, A Dictionary of English and Welsh Surnames: With Special American Instances, London: H. Frowde, 1901
- George Edward Cokayne, The Complete Peerage of England, Scotland, Ireland, Great Britain, and the United Kingdom Extant, Extinct, or Dormant; first edition by George Edward Cokayne, Clarenceux King of Arms; 2nd edition revised by the Hon. Vicary Gibbs et al., 1959; ISBN 0-904387-82-8 ISBN 0-7509-0154-3.
- Edward Foss, Biographia Juridica: A Biographical Dictionary of the Judges of England from the Conquest to the Present Time, 1066-1870, The Lawbook Exchange, Ltd., 1999
- Edward Foss, The Judges of England: with sketches of their lives, and miscellaneous notices connected with the Courts at Westminster, from the time of the Conquest, Longman, Brown, Green, and Longmans, 1848
- Lewis Christopher Loyd, Charles Travis Clay, David Charles Douglas, The Origins of Some Anglo-Norman Families, Genealogical Publishing Com, 1975
- Mark Antony Lower, Patronymica Britannica: A Dictionary of the Family Names of the United Kingdom, J.R. Smith, 1860
- Lucey & Lucy Family History by Norman Lucey - full genealogy for deLuci at http://www.rickmansworthherts.com/webpage10.htm
