= Luzi =

Luzi is an Italian surname derived from the Latin noun Lux (Lutius = Lucius), meaning "light". Notable people with the surname include:

== People ==
- Bruno Luzi, French football player and manager
- Enrico Luzi, Italian actor
- Giulia Luzi, Italian actress
- Giuseppe Cozza-Luzi, Italian savant
- Luzio Luzi, Italian painter
- Mario Luzi, Italian poet
- Patrice Luzi, French football player
- Spiridion Luzi, Greek scholar, diplomat, and politician

== See also ==
- Lucy
- Luce (disambiguation)
- Luci
