= Castellari =

Castellari is a surname of Italian origin. Notable people with this surname include:

- Corrado Castellari, Italian singer-songwriter and composer
- Enzo G. Castellari, Italian film director and screenwriter
- Luciana Castellari, Italian sprinter
