= Diodati =

Diodati or Deodati is a family name. The Diodati were a patrician family from Lucca. In Lucca, in the sixteenth century, they commissioned the sculptor and architect Nicolao Civitalia to build the Palazzo Diodati, now called the Palazzo Orsetti. They were forced to move to Geneva due to their adherence to Protestantism. The first to convert and to permanently reside in Geneva was Pompeo (1542-1602), son of Niccolò (of Alessandro) (1511-1544) and of his wife Zabetta Arnolfini. Pompeo became a disciple of Pier Martire Vermigli after having been exposed to reformist ideas during his travels to Piedmont and Lyon. In 1563 he was in Venice, in 1564 again in Lyons, in 1565 in Geneva; then in Montargis near Renata d'Este, when he returned to Lucca he was forced to flee, having been denounced to the Inquisition. He resided permanently in Geneva from 1572. Pompeo Diodati together with Francesco Turrettini, Orazio Micheli, Fabrizio Burlamacchi, Cesare Balbani, all fellow citizens of Lucca who were exiled for reasons of faith, created a cartel of Geneva silk merchants, called La Grande Boutique.

Notable people with the name include:

- Charles Diodati (1608?–1638), schoolmate and close friend of John Milton
- Élie Diodati (1576–1661), Genevan lawyer
- Fred Diodati, lead singer of The Four Aces since 1956
- Giovanni Diodati or Deodati (1576–1649), Italian Protestant Bible scholar
- Lucio Diodati (born 1955), Italian painter
- Roelof Deodati or Rodolfo Diodati, Dutch governor of Mauritius 1692–1703

== See also ==
- Villa Diodati, manor in Cologny near Lake Geneva, Switzerland
