= Lucious =

Lucious is a masculine given name, popular in the United States. Notable people with the name include:

== Given name ==
- Lucious Boyd (born 1959), American murderer
- Lucious Harris (born 1970), American basketball player
- Lucious Jackson (1941–2022), American basketball player
- Lucious Grandson Kanyumba (born 1972), Malawi politician
- Lucious Lyon, fictional character from the television series Empire
- Lucious Selmon (21st century), American football defensive lineman
- Lucious Smith (born 1957), American football cornerback

== Surname ==
- Korie Lucious (born 1989), American basketball player

== See also ==
- Lucius
- Lucius (disambiguation)
- Luscious (disambiguation)
