= Lucio =

- Pronunciation: Italian: [ˈluːtʃo] Spanish: [ˈluθjo]
- Gender: Male

Origin
- Origin: Latin
- Meaning: Light
- Region of origin: Italy, Spain, Portugal

Other names
- Related names: Lucius, Lucia, Lucy, Luci, Lucas, Luke

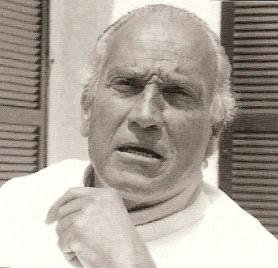
Lucio Attinelli

Lucio is an Italian and Spanish male given name derived from the Latin name Lucius. In Portuguese, the given name is accented Lúcio.

Lucio is also an Italian surname.

== Given name ==
- Lúcio (Lucimar Ferreira da Silva) (born 1978), Brazilian footballer
- Eduardo Lúcio Esteves Pereira (born 1954), Portuguese goalkeeper
- Lucio Abis (1926–2014), Italian politician
- Lucio Agostini (1913–1996), Italian-born composer, arranger and conductor
- Lucio Amanti (born 1977), Canadian cellist
- Lucio Maria Attinelli (born 1933), Italian journalist, writer and artist
- Lucio Battisti (1943–1998), Italian singer-songwriter
- Lucio Blanco (1879–1922), Mexican military officer
- Lucio Cabañas (1938–1974), Mexican teacher, who became a revolutionary
- Lúcio Cardoso (1912–1968), Brazilian writer
- Lucio Corsi (born 1993), Italian singer songwriter
- Lúcio Costa (1902–1998), Brazilian architect and urban planner
- Lúcio Curió (born 1984), Brazilian football player
- Lucio Dalla (1943–2012), Italian singer-songwriter
- Lucio De Caro (1922–2008), Italian screenwriter and film director
- Lucio Diodati (born 1955), Italian painter
- Lúcio Flávio (disambiguation), several people
- Lucio Fontana (1899–1968), Italian painter and sculptor
- Lucio Huaycho (born 1965), Bolivian politician
- Lúcio Idair Frasson (born 1953), Brazilian footballer
- Lucio Fulci (1927–1996), Italian horror film director
- Lucio Gutiérrez (born 1957), President of Ecuador from 2003–2005
- Lucio Russo (1944–2025), Italian physicist, mathematician and historian of science
- Lucio Serrani (born 1961), Italian hammer thrower
- Lúcio Soares (1934–1988), Portuguese footballer
- Lúcio Carlos Cajueiro Souza (born 1979), Brazilian footballer
- Lucio Tan (born 1934), Filipino businessman
- Lucio Urtubia (1931–2020), Spanish anarchist
- Lúcio Wagner (born 1976), Bulgarian footballer

== Surname ==
- Francisco Andres Lucio (born 1973), American record producer, singer-songwriter, musician and DJ
- Hanibal Lucić (1485–1553) known in Italian as Annibale Lucio, Croatian language poet and playwright from Venetian Dalmatia
- Johannes Lucius (Croatian: Ivan Lučić, Italian: Giovanni Lucio) (1604–1679), historian
- Lucius Accius (170 – c. 86 BC), Roman tragic poet
- Melissa Lucio (born 1969), American woman on death row in Texas
- Lucius Annaeus Seneca (c. 4 BC – AD 65), Roman philosopher
- Shannon Lucio (born 1980), American actress

== Fictional characters ==
- Lúcio (Overwatch), a player character in the video games Overwatch and Heroes of the Storm
- Lucio, a minor character in Shakespeare's Measure for Measure
- Lucio Marcano, an unseen deceased character in the game Mafia III who appears on a collectible cigarette cards in Mafia: Definitive Edition
- Lucio, a character in the game Limbus Company in the ninth chapter of the game, Canto IX: The Unsevering.

== See also ==
- Lucas (disambiguation)
- Lucia (disambiguation)
- Luciano (disambiguation)
- Luci
- Lucius
- San Lucio Pass
