= Richard Luce =

Richard Luce may refer to:

- Richard Luce, Baron Luce (born 1936), British Conservative government minister, Lord Chamberlain to the Queen, Governor of Gibraltar
- Richard Luce (surgeon) (1867–1952), British medical doctor, army general, MP for Derby

== See also ==
- Luce (name)
