= Lucioni =

Lucioni is an Italian surname derived from Latin name Lucius and may refer to:

== People ==
- Danella Lucioni (born 1984), a Peru-born Italian model
- Fabio Lucioni, an Italian footballer
- Luigi Lucioni, an Italian-born American painter
- José Luccioni (tenor), a French operatic tenor of Corsican origin
- Sasha Luccioni (born 1990), Ukrainian-born computer scientist

== See also ==
- Lucini (disambiguation)
- Luci
