= Lucia (name) =

- Gender: Female

Origin
- Origin: Latin
- Meaning: Light
- Region of origin: Ancient Rome

Other names
- Related names: Lucy, Luci, Luce, Lucie, Lucey, Lucio, Lucile, Luciana, Luciano, Lucinda, Cindy, Luca, Luz, Lucija
- Popularity: see popular names

Lucia is both a feminine given name and a surname. It comes from the Latin word Lux meaning 'light'. It is the feminine form of the Roman praenomen Lucius and can be alternatively spelled as Lucy. It is used in French (Lucie), Romanian, Italian, Spanish (Lucía), Portuguese (Lúcia), Greek (Λουκία), English, and Slavic languages.

== Given name ==
- Saint Lucia (283–304), Christian saint and martyr (also known as Saint Lucy)
- Sister Lúcia (1907–2005), one of three children who claimed to have seen and heard the Virgin Mary
- Lucia H. Faxon Additon (1847–1919), American writer, teacher, social reformer
- Lucia Albano (born 1965), Italian politician
- Lucia Aniello (born 1983), Italian-born American director, writer, and producer
- Lucia Apolzan (1911–2001), Romanian ethnographer, anthropologist
- Lucia Berlin (1936–2004), American short story writer
- Lucia Bosè (1931–2020), Italian actress
- Lucia Bosetti (born 1989), Italian volleyball player
- Lucia Bronze, better known as Lucy Bronze (b. 1991), English footballer, played as Lucia Bronze at some youth level
- Lucia Bronzetti (born 1998), Italian tennis player
- Lucia Ciampi (born 1950), Italian politician
- Lucia Cifarelli (born 1970), member of industrial band KMFDM
- Lucia Dalmasso (born 1997), Italian snowboarder
- Lucia Dvorská (born 1988), Slovak model
- Lucía Etxebarria de Asteinza (born 1966), Spanish writer
- Łucja Frey (Polish spelling; 1889–1942?), Polish physician and neurologist
- Lucia Field (born 2004), Australian dancer and singer children's entertainer, member of The Wiggles and daughter of Anthony Field
- Lucia Galeazzi Galvani (1743–1788), Italian scientist
- Lucía González (born 2006), Spanish rhythmic gymnast
- Lucía González (born 2007), Argentine rhythmic gymnast
- Lucía Hiriart de Pinochet (1923–2021), widow of former Chilean dictator Augusto Pinochet
- Lucia Ruggles Holman (1793–1886), teacher and letter writer; first American woman to sail around the world
- Lucía Jiménez (born 1978), Spanish actress
- Lucía Jiménez Vicente (born 1997), Spanish field hockey player
- Lucia Joyce (1907–1982), dancer
- Lucia Kimani (born 1981), Bosnian athlete
- Lucia Krim, American child killed along with her brother by their nanny in 2012
- Lucia Kurilovská (born 1967), Slovak politician
- Lucía Lacarra (born 1975), Spanish ballet dancer
- Lúcia G. Lohmann, Brazilian botanist
- Lucía López (born 1974), Spanish field hockey player
- Lúcia Machado de Almeida (1910–2005), Brazilian writer
- Lucia Mbuti, Namibian politician
- Lucia Mendez (born 1955), Mexican actress and singer
- Lucia Micarelli (born 1983), American violinist
- Lucia Migliaccio, Duchess of Floridia (1770–1826)
- Lúcia Moniz (born 1976), Portuguese singer and actress
- Lucía Muñoz (born 2008), Spanish rhythmic gymnast
- Lucia Nimcová (born 1977), Slovak photographer
- Lucia Pamela (1904–2002), musician
- Lúcia Petterle (born 1949), Brazilian doctor and beauty queen
- Lucía Pinochet (born 1943), daughter of former Chilean dictator Augusto Pinochet and Lucía Hiriart de Pinochet
- Lucia Plaváková (born 1984), Slovak politician
- Lucia Popp (1939–1993), operatic soprano
- Lucia Puttrich (born 1961), German politician
- Lucia Rijker (born 1967), Dutch professional boxer
- Lucía Rodríguez (athlete) (born 1998), Spanish athlete
- Lucia Runkle (1844–1922), American editorial writer
- Lucia Autorino Salemme (c. 1919–2010), American painter, educator, and writer
- Lucia Siposová (born 1980), stage, television and film actress
- Lucía Spangenberg, Uruguayan bioinformatician researcher and co-founder of the biotech startup GenLives
- Lucia Toader (1960–2013), Romanian rower
- Lucía Topolansky (born 1944), Uruguayan politician
- Lucía Trasviña Waldenrath, Mexican politician
- Lucía Val (born 2004), Spanish canoeist
- Lucía Villalón (born 1988), Spanish sports journalist and television presenter
- Lucia Virasinghe-Chinnappa (1894–1980), Sri Lankan medical doctor
- Lucía Zaráte (1863–1890), Mexican entertainer
- Lucia Zedner (born 1961), British legal scholar

== Surname ==
- Bruno Lucia (born 1960), Australian stand-up comedian and performer
- Carmen Lucia (1902–1985), union organizer in the United States
- Douglas Lucia (born 1963), U.S. Catholic bishop
- Fedez (born as Federico Leonardo Lucia in 1989), Italian rapper
- Fernando de Lucia (1860/1861–1925), Italian tenor
- Gina Lucia, American artist
- Ray Lucia (born 1950), American financial advisor, author and radio and television host

== Fictional characters ==
- Lucia Ashton, the title character of Lucia di Lammermoor, a 1836 opera by Gaetano Donizetti
- Lucia Caminos, one of two playable characters in Grand Theft Auto VI
- Lucia Morgan, a playable character in Final Fight 3 and Street Fighter V
- Lucia Raregroove, a major enemy in the Japanese manga/anime series Rave Master
- Lucia von Bardas, Marvel Comics villainess'
- Lucia (Devil May Cry), a playable character in Devil May Cry 2
- One of the title characters of Mapp and Lucia, a series of novels by E. F. Benson

== See also ==
- Lucia (disambiguation)
- Santa Lucia (disambiguation)
