= Luscious =

Luscious may refer to:

- MC Luscious, Rosalyn McCall, American Miami bass recording artist
- Luscious, alternate name used by Ali Forney

== See also ==
- Lucious, a given name
- Lucius (disambiguation)
