= Richard de Lucy =

12th-century Anglo-Norman sheriff and nobleman

Chief Justiciar of England
- In office 1154 – 1178 or 1179
- Monarch: Henry II
- Preceded by: Robert de Beaumont, 2nd Earl of Leicester
- Succeeded by: Ranulf de Glanvill

Sheriff of Essex
- In office 1156–1157

Personal details
- Died: 14 July 1179 Lesnes Abbey, Kent
- Spouse: Rohese
- Children: Geoffrey de Lucy, Godfrey de Lucy, Maud de Lucy, Alice de Lucy, Aveline de Lucy

Richard de Lucy, Luci, Lucie, or Lusti (died 14 July 1179), also known as Richard the Loyal, was first noted as High Sheriff of Essex, after which he was made Chief Justiciar of England.

== Life ==
The De Lucy family took its surname from Lucé in southern Normandy, then still held by the English kings. Richard inherited from his father estates in Norfolk, Suffolk, Kent, and Normandy. His mother was Aveline, the niece and heiress of William Goth. In the charter for Sées Cathedral in February 1130–31 Henry I refers to Richard de Lucy and his mother, Aveline. His brother, Walter de Luci, was abbot of Battle Abbey. De Lucy's wife, Rohese, who is named in several documents, was possibly a sister of Faramus of Boulogne and a descendant of the counts of Boulogne.

An early reference to the family refers to the render by King Henry I of the lordship of Diss, Norfolk to Richard de Lucy, Governor of Falaise, Normandy, after defending it with great valour and heroic conduct when besieged by Count Geoffrey V of Anjou.

In 1153–4 De Lucy was granted Chipping Ongar, Essex by William, son of King Stephen and his wife, Matilda of Boulogne. He may have built the motte-and-bailey Ongar Castle, although it is also attributed to Count Eustace II of Boulogne (c. 1015 – c. 1087). Richard de Lucy was appointed Sheriff of both Essex and Hertfordshire for 1156.

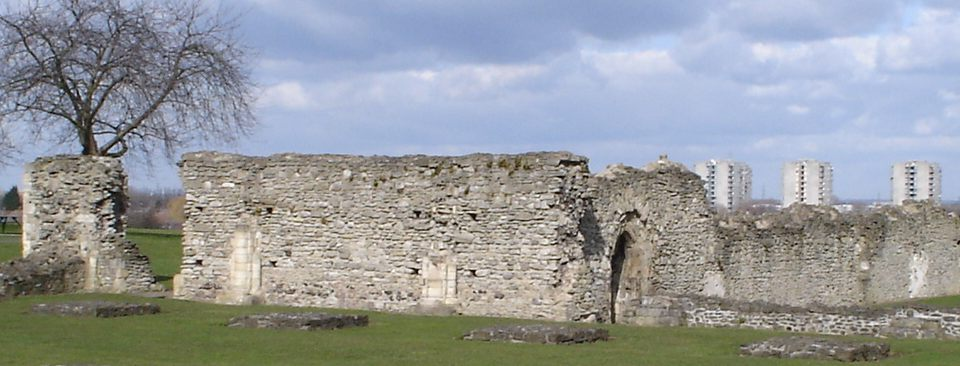
The ruins of Lesnes Abbey, in Bexley, south-east London

When King Henry II came to the throne in 1154, De Lucy was made Chief Justiciar of England jointly with Robert de Beaumont, Earl of Leicester. When de Beaumont died in 1168, De Lucy continued to hold the office in his own right. One of the members of his household was Roger fitzReinfrid, the brother of Walter de Coutances. Roger became a royal judge and later donated land to Lesnes Abbey in Kent, which had been founded by De Lucy.

During the Revolt of 1173–74 Henry II made Richard de Lucy regent and him in charge of the kingdom's defence while Henry II campaigned in mainland Europe. He resigned his office between September 1178 and Easter of 1179, and retired to Lesnes Abbey, where, three months later on 14 July 1179, he died and was buried.

== Legacy ==
Richard's son Godfrey de Lucy entered the clergy and became bishop of Winchester (1189–1204). Richard's eldest son Geoffrey de Lucy predeceased him and Geoffrey's two sons Geoffrey and Richard died without children early in the reign of Richard I (r. 1189–1199). This led to protracted litigation over his estate between Richard and Geoffrey's daughters that lasted until the reign of Henry III (r. 1216–1272).

Political offices
Preceded by Robert de Beaumont, 2nd Earl of Leicester	Chief Justiciar jointly with Robert de Beaumont, 2nd Earl of Leicester until 1168; 1154 – c. 1179	Succeeded by Ranulf de Glanville
