= Perino del Vaga =

Italian painter (1501–1547)

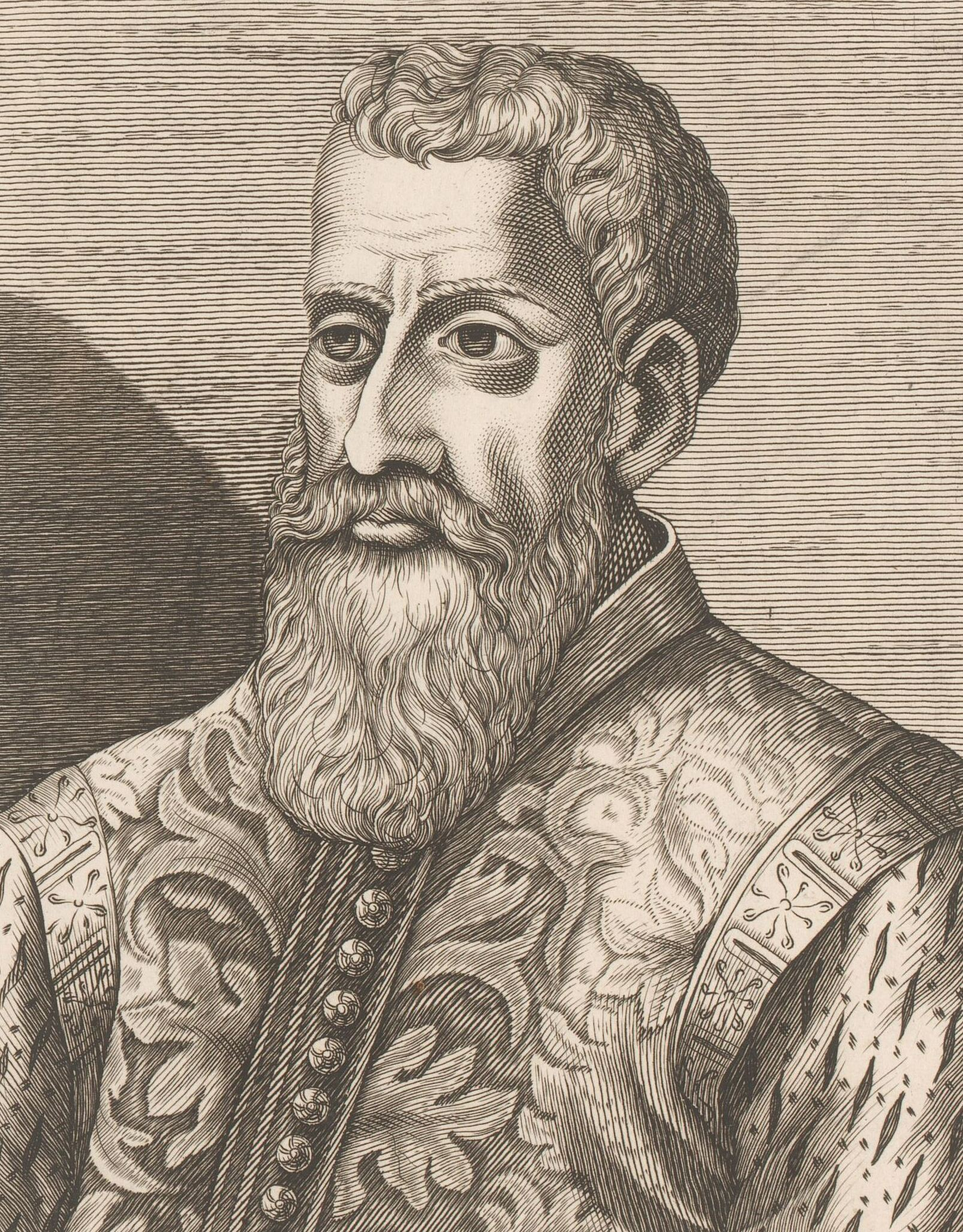
Portrait of Perin del Vaga by Nicolas de Larmessin.

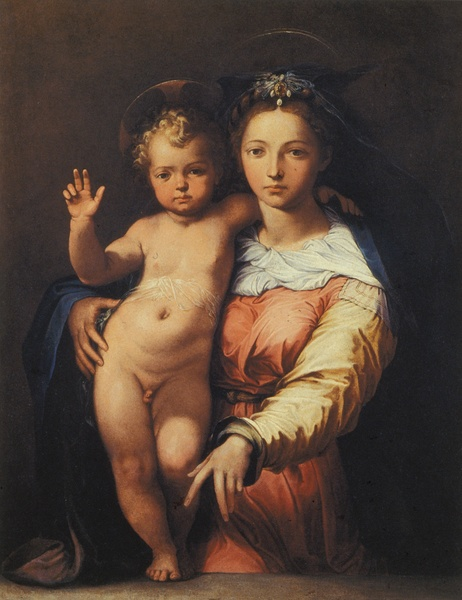
Perino del Vaga, Madonna and Child, oil on canvas, Rome, Palazzo Montecitorio.

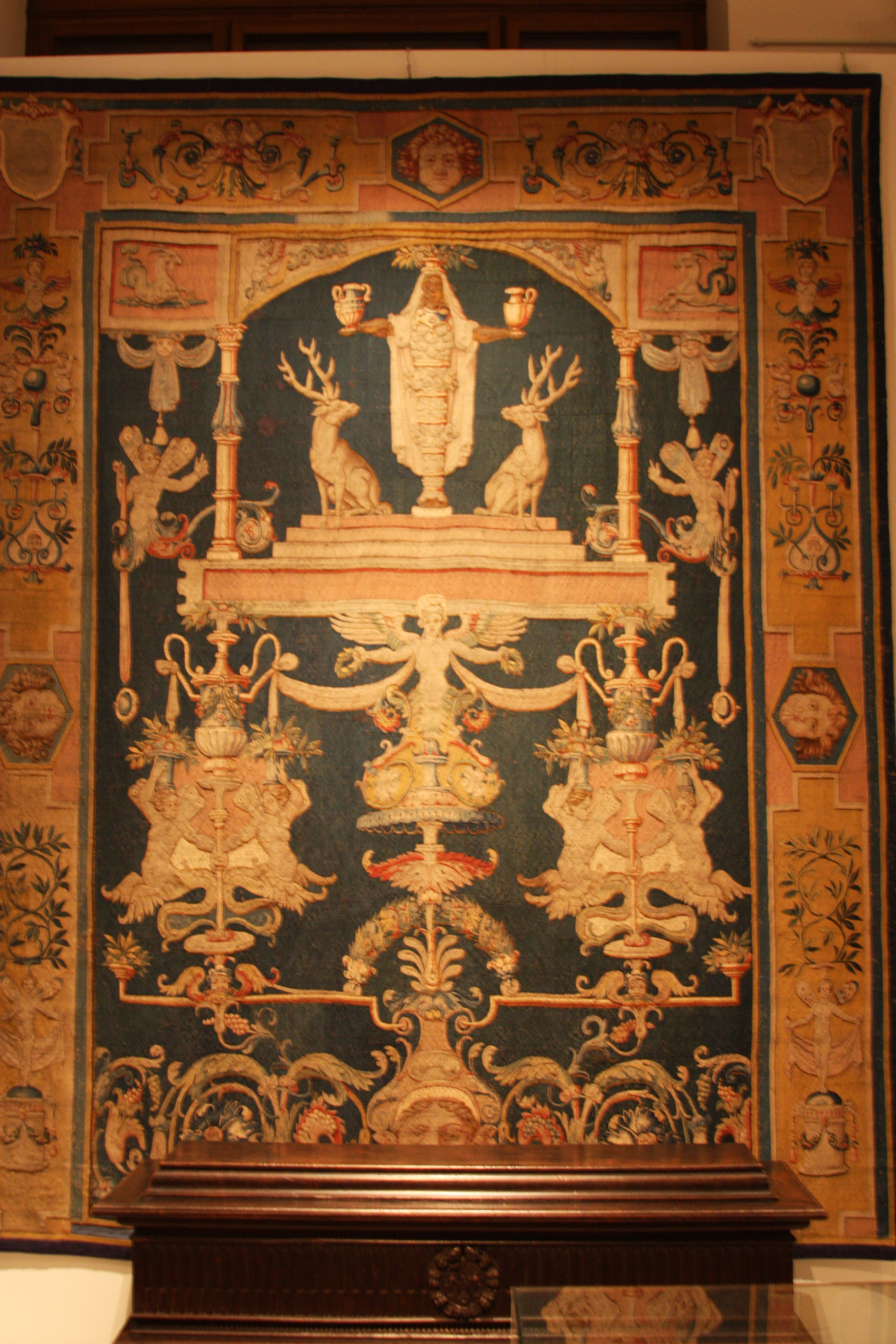
Brussels tapestry with the motif "Diana of Ephesus" by Perino del Vaga, 1545.

Piero Bonaccorsi (1501 – October 19, 1547), known as Perino (or Perin) del Vaga, was an Italian painter and draughtsman of the Late Renaissance/Mannerism.

== Biography ==
Perino was born near Florence. His father ruined himself by gambling, and became a soldier in the invading army of Charles VIII. His mother died when he was but two months old; but shortly afterwards he was taken up by his father's second wife. Perino was first apprenticed to a druggist, but soon passed into the hands of a mediocre painter, Andrea de' Ceri, and when eleven years of age, of Ridolfo Ghirlandaio.

Perino was one of Ghirlandaio's most talented pupils. Another mediocre painter, Vaga from Toscanella, undertook to settle the boy in Rome. Perino, when he at last reached Rome, was utterly poor, and with no clear prospect beyond journey-work for trading decorators. He was eventually entrusted with some of the subordinate work undertaken by Raphael in the Vatican. He assisted Giovanni da Udine in the stucco and arabesque decorations of the Loggie Vaticane, and executed some of those small but finely composed scriptural subjects which go by the name of Raphael's Bible, Raphael himself furnishing the designs.

Perino's examples are: Abraham and Isaac, Jacob wrestling with the Angel, Joseph and his Brothers, the Hebrews crossing the Jordan, Fall and Capture of Jericho, Joshua commanding Sun to stand still, Birth of Christ, Baptism and the Last Supper. Some of these are in bronze-tint, while others are in full color. He also painted, after Raphael's drawings, figures of the planets in the great hall of the Appartamenti Borgia. Perino was soon regarded as his major assistant, second only to Giulio Romano.

To Raphael himself he was always exceedingly attentive. His solo works in the city include the hall of Palazzo Baldassini (1520–1522), a noble building in the center of the city, and the Pietà in the church of Santo Stefano del Cacco.

After Raphael's death in 1520 and the plague of 1523, a troubled period ensued for Perino. He returned to Florence, and befriended Rosso Fiorentino and executed an admirable design of 10,000 Martyrs (now lost).

== Work in Genoa ==
In 1527, Andrea Doria invited Perino to Genoa to decorate the newly rebuilt Villa del Principe. Work commenced in 1529, with Perino employing a style similar to that of Giulio Romano in the Mantuan Palazzo Te. The finished palace contained frescoes of mythological and historical subjects, augmented by fanciful and graceful arabesque work and by sculptural details in stucco. Among the principal works are: the War between the Gods and Giants, Horatius Cocles defending the Bridge, and the Fortitude of Mutius Scaevola. The most important work of all, the Shipwreck of Aeneas, is no longer extant. Perino also executed numerous altarpieces and designs for tapestries, rapidly founding a quasi-Roman school of art in the Ligurian city. He made two visits to Pisa, and began some painting in the cathedral.

A year later, Perino returned to Rome and frescoed the Pucci Chapel in the Trinità dei Monti. Pope Paul III granted him a regular salary. He retouched many works of Raphael. He painted the decoration for the Pauline Chapel and other halls of Castel Sant'Angelo, some frescoes in the church of San Marcello, a monochrome in the Stanza della Segnatura in the Vatican and a cartoon of the Sistine Chapel.

Perino was engaged in the general decoration of the Sala Reale, begun by Paul III when he died on October 19, 1547, in Rome. He is buried in the Pantheon. His work in the Castel Sant'Angelo was continued by his student Pellegrino Tibaldi.

== Assessment and legacy ==
Del Vaga's style was renowned for his vitality and elegance. His paintings are considered important in the mediation between the Roman Raphaelesque tradition and the first Florentine Mannerism. He combined the manners of Raphael and Andrea del Sarto. Many of his works were engraved, even in his own lifetime. Daniele da Volterra, Girolamo Siciolante da Sermoneta, Luzio Romano and Marcello Venusti (also known as il Mantovano) were among his principal assistants.
