= Luciana =

Luciana may refer to:

- Luciana (given name), a Latin feminine given name
- Luciana (singer), British pop singer
- Luciana, Ciudad Real, a small village and municipality in Spain
- Luciana (album), by Juno Reactor
