= Lucci =

Lucci is a surname. Notable people with the surname include:

- Antonio Lucci (1682–1752), blessed Italian Franciscan
- Giovanni Luca Lucci (1637–1740), Italian painter
- Giovanni Ulisse Lucci (active 1717–1760s), Italian painter
- Mike Lucci (1939–2021), American football player
- Settimio Lucci, Italian professional football coach
- Susan Lucci (born 1946), American actress on All My Children
- YFN Lucci, real name Rayshawn Lamar Bennett (born 1991), American rapper, singer, and songwriter
- Rob Lucci, a character from the anime and manga series One Piece
