= Luce (name) =

- Pronunciation: /ˈluːs/ Italian: [ˈluːtʃe] French: [lys]
- Gender: Male/Female

Origin
- Origin: Latin
- Meaning: Light

Other names
- Related names: Lucy, Luci, Lucette, Lucia, Lucio, Lucile, Lucey, Luciana, Luciano, Lucinda, Luca, Luke, Luz

Luce is an American, English, Irish, Scottish, Welsh, French and Italian surname. It is also a French and Italian feminine given name, and it is a variant of Lucy. The meaning of the given name Luce is "light".

The English Luce surname is taken from the Norman language that was Latin-based and derives from place names in Normandy based on Latin male personal name Lucius. It was transmitted to England after the Norman Conquest in the 11th century. Alternative spellings and related names include Luci, Lucy, Lucey, Lucie, and Lucia.

Luce can refer to:

== People ==
=== Given name ===
As a given name, Luce can refer to:

- Luce (mascot) mascot of the catholic 2025 jubilee year
- Luce (singer) (born 1990), real name Lucie Brunet, French singer, winner of Nouvelle Star in 2010
- Luce Caponegro (born 1966), Italian actress and TV presenter and a former pornographic actress, best known under the stage name Selen
- Luce de Gast, Lord of the castle of Gast
- Luce Dufault (born 1966), French-Canadian singer
- Luce Eekman (1933–2025), French architect and actress
- Luce Fabbri (1908–2000), Italian anarchist writer
- Luce Irigaray (born 1930), Belgian feminist, philosopher, linguist, psychoanalytic, sociologist and cultural theorist
- Luce López-Baralt (born 1944), Puerto Rican scholar

=== Surname ===
As a surname, Luce can refer to:

- A. A. Luce (1882–1977), Irish academic and cleric
- Albert Luce (1888–1962), American industrialist
- Angela Luce (1937/1938–2026), Italian film actress and singer
- Charles D. Luce (1820–1887), American politician
- Claire Luce (1903–1989), American actress and dancer
- Clare Boothe Luce (1903–1987), American playwright and politician
- Clarence Sumner Luce (1852–1924), American architect
- Cyrus G. Luce (1824–1905), former governor of the U.S. state of Michigan
- Damien Luce (born 1978), French pianist
- David Luce (1906–1971), British Admiral and First Sea Lord of the Royal Navy
- Derrel Luce (born 1952), American football linebacker
- Don Luce (born 1948), Canadian hockey player
- R. Duncan Luce (1925–2012), American mathematician and psychologist
- Edward Luce (born 1968), British journalist
- Edwin John Luce (1881–1918), British writer and journalist in Jèrriais, the Norman language of Jersey
- Gordon H. Luce (1889–1979), an English scholar of Burma
- Henry Luce (1898–1967), American magazine magnate; co-founder and editor of Time Magazine, philanthropist
- John Luce (disambiguation)
- Kelly Luce, American writer
- Lew Luce (1938–2020), American football running back
- Maximilien Luce (1858–1941), French painter
- Mike Luce, American drummer
- Moses A. Luce (1842–1933), American Sergeant in the Union Army
- Renan Luce (born 1980), a French singer and songwriter
- Richard Luce (surgeon) (1867–1952) British medical doctor, army Major-General, MP for Derby
- Richard Luce, Baron Luce (born 1936), British politician
- Robert Luce (1862–1946), American politician
- Ron Luce (born 1961), American evangelist
- Stanford Luce (1923–2007), a translator of Jules Verne and Louis-Ferdinand Céline
- Stephen Luce (1827–1917), U.S. Navy admiral
- William Luce (colonial administrator) (1907–1977), British diplomat
- William Luce (1931–2019), American dramatist

== See also ==
- Luci
- Lucia (disambiguation) or Lúcia
- Lucy
- Luz (name)
