= Lucchi =

Lucchi may refer to:

- Francesca Lucchi (or Fanny Salvini-Donatelli; c.1815 – 1891) was an Italian operatic soprano
- Giovanni Lucchi (1942–2012), Italian bow maker who founded the first school of bow making in Italy.
- Marcellino Lucchi (born 1957), Italian former Grand Prix motorcycle road racer
- Michele De Lucchi (born 1951), Italian architect and designer
- Sabrina Lucchi (born 1968), Italian former professional tennis player

== See also ==
- Lucchini (disambiguation)
