= Giovanni Ulisse Lucci =

Italian painter

Giovanni Ulisse Lucci (active 1717-1760s) was an Italian painter of the late-Baroque period, active near his native Fabriano in the Region of the Marche. He trained with his father, the painter Giovanni Luca Lucci (1637–1740) also of Fabriano. He painted frescoes for the churcho of San Benedetto and San Silvestro in Fabriano.
