= George Kenneth Lucey Jr. =

American engineer

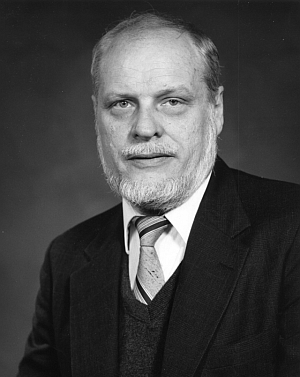
- Born: November 13, 1937 (age 88); New Orleans, Louisiana
- Education: University of Maryland
- Awards: Department of Army Decoration for Meritorious Civilian Service
- Scientific career
- Fields: Mechanical engineering
- Workplaces: Harry Diamond Laboratories (Retired)

George Kenneth Lucey Jr. (born November 13, 1937) was a Branch Chief at the U.S. Army Harry Diamond Laboratories who also served the U.S. Army Materiel Command as the Manufacturing Technology (ManTech) Thrust Area Manager for Soldering Technology.

== Career ==
He entered the US Army Harry Diamond Laboratories as a mechanical engineer student trainee in 1959 and retired in 2001. As a Senior level Branch Chief, he was an inventor named in 14 Patents and in 1982 was decorated by the Commanding Officer as Inventor of the Year for contributions that lowered the production cost of artillery fuzes. He also served as manager of multimillion-dollar programs, one example being the first production of the M734 Multi-Option Mortar Fuze for war reserves. In the field of manufacturing science, he managed the US Army ManTech Thrust Area for Soldering Technology, which was responsible for reducing the cost of Army electronic systems on a national scale by introducing new technologies into industrial base soldering lines.

He coordinated the national ManTech mission with activities having common interests and willing to share results, namely Small Business Innovative Research soldering programs supported by the Air Force, Navy ManTech programs, Department of Defense study groups for Soldering Standard 2000, the United Kingdom Ministry of Defense, Tri-Service Quality Assurance personnel, university professors, and major defense contractors willing to serve as test beds in no-cost Cooperative Research and Development Agreements. For these accomplishments he received the US Army Harry Diamond Laboratories’ John A. Ulrich Award for Managerial Leadership, 1989.

He identified the gaps in scientific research that were inhibiting productivity on soldering lines by sponsoring Sandia National Laboratories to conduct symposia with 50 renowned scientists from academe, industry, and government and publish three textbooks to serve as roadmaps for future research: The Mechanics of Solder Alloy Interconnects, The Mechanics of Solder Alloy Wetting and Spreading, and Solder Mechanics.

He supplied copies of these textbooks to graduate level classes at nine universities and encouraged the writing of additional textbooks by the University of Maryland Center for Advanced Life Cycle Engineering (CALCE) as a means of inserting other DOD Critical Technologies into the curricula of a new graduate degree in electronics manufacturing. His vision and in-kind help was instrumental in formulating a successful educational program at CALCE, funded by DARPA in 1994–97, leading to a comprehensive graduate engineering curriculum in electronic products and systems. Today, this program is internationally recognized as one of the premier world-class programs in this subject matter, offers over 12 graduate courses and has over 300 alumni at leading electronics manufacturers all over the world, shaping the future of the industry. For this accomplishment, he shared with Dr. Abhijit Dasgupta of CALCE the US Army Research Laboratories Associated Achievement Award for Technology Transfer. To support hands-on laboratory studies, he also supplied inspection equipment for electronic manufacturing to the U.S. Navy Electronics Manufacturing Productivity Facility at the Naval Weapons Support Center, Crane, Indiana.

He noted the cost driver that was nationally pervasive on production lines was the inspection of assemblies after soldering and the subsequent reworking of joints with irregular shapes simply because there were no tools available to assess the risk to reliability after delivery. He decided variations in wetting and spreading were root causes of irregular shapes and invested in radically new research at the Rockwell International Science Center, the Microelectronics Center of North Carolina, and the National Institute of Science and Technology.

The result was an accelerated commercialization of five inventions: Sequential Electrochemical Reduction Analysis (SERA) by Dr. Morgan Tench enabled manufacturers to improve yield by precisely measuring the solderability of parts before beginning assembly. Reduced Oxide Soldering Activation (ROSA) by Dr. Morgan Tench enabled manufacturers to reduce scrap and materials by restoring solderability to the entire lot of components before assembly without using flux; Plasma Assisted Dry Soldering (PADS) by Dr. Stephan Bobbio reduced the cost of materials and handling by enabling components to be soldered without flux. A national Laminography Standard by Dr. Thomas Siewert enabled X-Ray laminography inspection machines to be more accurately calibrated. And, Composite Solders by George Lucey and Dr. Roger Clough offered manufacturers the opportunity to reduce inspection and rework by increasing the strength of the joint.

These cooperative efforts of nationally renowned scientists and engineers from government-industry-academia met the Army mission objective of developing new manufacturing technologies capable of reducing the procurement cost of electronic weapons systems currently in production. The program ended, however, when a joint Army – Industry study in 1990 concluded the overall Army ManTech program investments focusing primarily on soldering were too low to incentivize contractors into quick implementation on a large national scale. The study recommendation, instead, was to redirect funding into research for new manufacturing concepts for weapons of the future.

The Army Materiel Command presented George Lucey the second highest award offered to civilians in 1990, the US Army Decoration for Meritorious Civilian Service. He was also a member of the SERA team that won a worldwide competition among Rockwell plants and received the Rockwell International Corporation Chairman's Team Award in 1993. In 1994 the Cahners R&D Magazine presented the SERA team with the prestigious national R&D100 Award as one of the top 100 new products of the year. In 1996, Dr. Bobbio received the R&D100 award for PADS.

== Education ==
He graduated from the University of Maryland College Park with a B.S. (1960) and M.S. (1967) in mechanical engineering with emphasis on stress wave theory, inelastic deformation theory, and advanced machine design. He also completed 670 hours of in-service training focusing on program management, contract management, quality control, producibility, finances, configuration management, motivation, contract law, and value engineering.

== Honors ==
- US Army Research Laboratory Associated Achievement Award for Technology Transfer, 1996
- Cahners Magazine R&D 100 Award, Top 100 Inventions of 1994
- Rockwell International Corporation Chairman's International Team Award, 1993
- US Army Decoration for Meritorious Civilian Service, 1990
- US Army Harry Diamond Laboratories John A. Ulrich Award for Managerial Leadership, 1989
- US Army Harry Diamond Laboratories Decoration as Inventor of the Year, 1982

== Background ==
George K. Lucey Jr. (nicknamed Stormy) was born in New Orleans, Louisiana, on November 13, 1937, to Phyllis Claire Curott and George Kenneth Lucey. Soon after WWII (1947) the father became one of the first overseas navigators for Trans World Airlines and the family was moved to Rome, Italy. Stormy and his older sister attended elementary school at the Overseas School of Rome in the villa of the recently deceased dictator, Benito Mussolini.

TWA relocated the family at the onset of the 1948 Arab-Israeli war, to Heliopolis, near Cairo Egypt. The children attended the Heliopolis Sporting Club and the English School of Cairo (1948–51) until a British firefight with Egyptians in Ismaïlia resulted in Black Saturday riots that burned hundreds of buildings in Cairo (26 January 1952) and the 23 July Revolution that deposed King Farouk. For safety, the family moved outside Cairo to Maadi, where the children attended the Cairo American School (1952–53) and the Maadi Sporting Club.

Once a home was built in Colesville MD, the family returned to America in 1953, where both children graduated from Sherwood High School and the University of Maryland. The sister, Margo Lucey won the Miss District of Columbia beauty contest and later was the first runner-up to Miss America (1955).

== Patents ==
1. George K. Lucey, Jr., Thomas Gher, Guy Cooper, Robert J. Richter, "Method for Using a Ring Vortex", US Patent, Serial #6,544,347 B2, April 8, 2003.
2. George K. Lucey, Jr., "System and Method for Sealing High Density Electronic Circuits", US Patent, Serial #6,207,892, March 27, 2001.
3. Louis J. Jasper, Jr., George K. Lucey, Jr., Thomas J. Gher, Louis E Jasper, "Projectile With an Air Pressure Wave Generator and Chemical Agent Marker", US Patent, Serial #6,213,024, April 10, 2001.
4. George K. Lucey, Jr., Melvyn J. Shichtman, "Method for Detecting Toxic Chemical Concentration in Individuals", US Patent, Serial #6,044,293, March 28, 2000.
5. Stephen M. Bobbio, Thomas D. DuBois, Farid M. Tranjan, George K. Lucey, Jr., James D. Geis, Robert F. Lipscomb, Timothy Piekarski, "Fluxless Soldering Method", US Patent, Serial #5,609,290, March 11, 1997.
6. George K. Lucey, Jr., James A. Wasynczuk, Roger B. Clough, Jennie S. Hwang, "Composite Solders", US Patent, Serial #5,520,752, May 28, 1996.
7. Brett Piekarski, George K. Lucey, John Langan, "Solderability Tester Methodology", US Patent, Serial #5,357,346, October 18, 1994.
8. George K. Lucey, Jr., Michael G. Orrell, "Springless Impact Switch", US Patent, Serial #4,174,666 November 20, 1979.
9. Charles W. H. Barnett, George K. Lucey, Jr., Douglas R. Augustine, "Flight Simulator for Missiles", US Patent, Serial #3,960,000, June 1, 1976.
10. Samuel A. Clark, Jr., George K. Lucey, Jr., Thomas H. Zimmerman, "Protective Metal Shield for Plastic Fuze Radomes", US Patent, Serial #3,971,024, July 20, 1976.
11. David Williams, George K. Lucey, Jr., "Rain Impact Sensing Proximity Fuze", US Patent, Serial #3,926,120, December 16, 1975.
12. George K. Lucey Jr., "Stress Free Rod and Eyelet Assembly for Plastic to Metal Interfaces", US Patent, Serial # 3,773,427, November 20, 1973.
13. Murray Ressler, George K. Lucey Jr., "Stress Free Crimp Joint for Plastic To Metal Interfaces", US Patent, Serial #3,594,027, July 20, 1971.
14. David Williams, George K. Lucey Jr., "Crush Switch", US Patent, Serial #3,458,673, July 29, 1969.
