= Lucette =

Lucette may refer to:

- Lucette, a schooner crewed by Linda Robertson (castaway), sunk in 1972

== People with the given name ==
- Lucette Aldous (1938–2021), Australian ballet dancer and ballet teacher
- Lucette Desvignes (1926–2024), French writer
- Lucette Finas (born 1921), French author and essayist, part of the structuralist movement
- Lucette Lagnado, American journalist and memoirist born in Cairo, Egypt
- Lucette Lousteau (born 1948), French politician
- Lucette Michaux-Chevry, the head of the Regional council of the French overseas department of Guadeloupe between 1992 and 2004
