= Lucida Mansi =

Italian noblewoman (1606–1649)

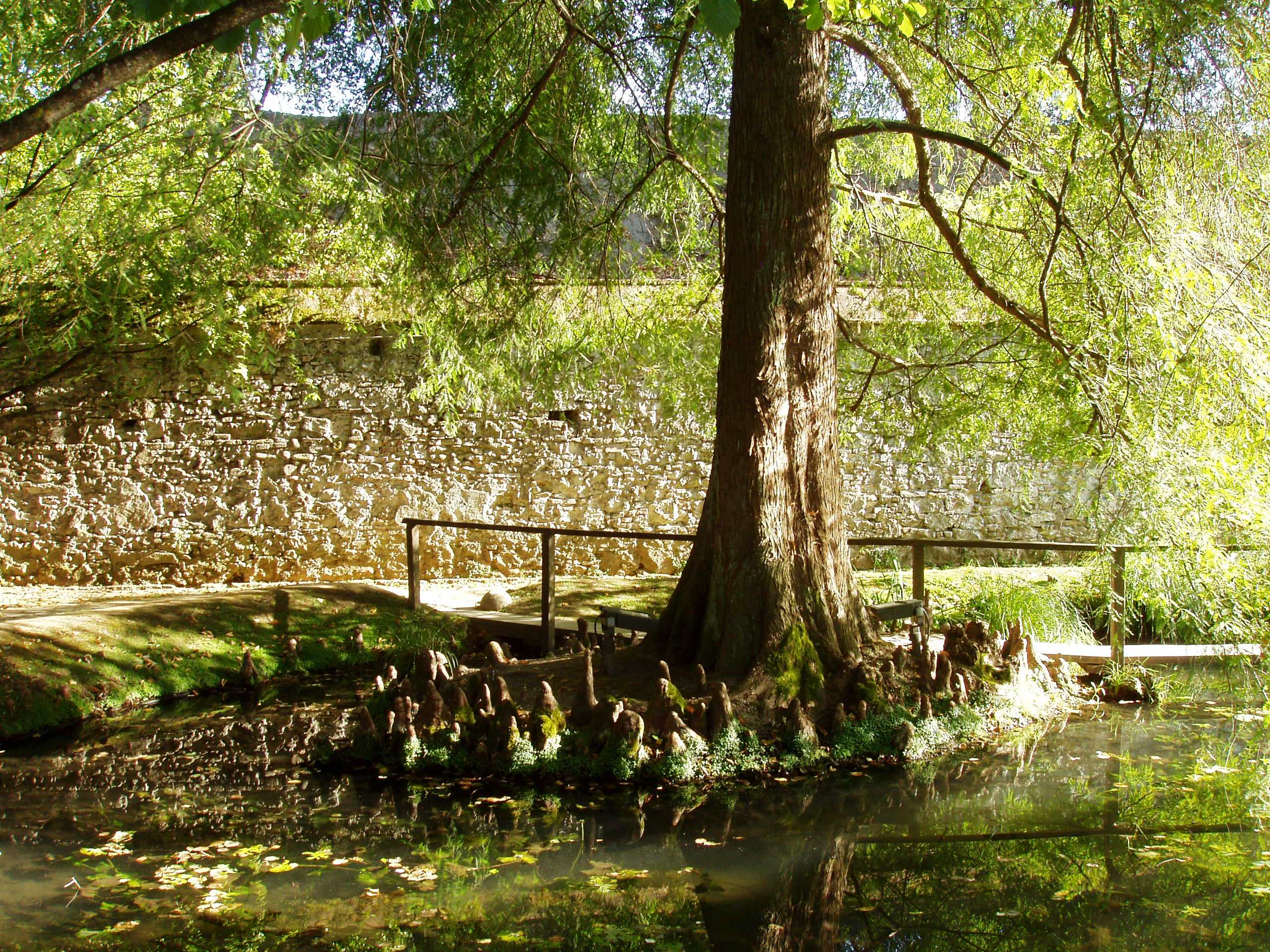
Orto Botanico Comunale di Lucca – pond and city wall

Lucida Mansi (Lucca, c. 1606 – Lucca, c. February 12, 1649) was an Italian noblewoman, and the subject of a legend in the province of Lucca, Italy. She is of uncertain origins.

== Biography ==
Lucida was married very young to Vincenzo Diversi, who was killed in the early years of their marriage. Made a widow early, she was remarried to the old and very wealthy Gaspare di Nicolao Mansi. The wealthy Mansi family was well-known earlier than the 16th century in much of Europe thanks to their trade in silk. Their marriage was the subject of much gossip, due to their significant age difference and how much more attractive Lucida was than her husband. Lucida was very vain, and is rumored to have dedicated an entire room in the Villa Mansi to mirrors in order to admire her own appearance.

Lucida died of the plague on 12 February 1649, and was laid to rest in the chiesa dei Cappuccini a Lucca, in her family's crypt.

== Lucida in legend ==
According to legend, Lucida Mansi made a pact with the devil. The legend states that she killed her lovers by throwing them down a ditch covered in sharp blades.
