= Lucius Trant O'Shea =

British chemist and mining engineer

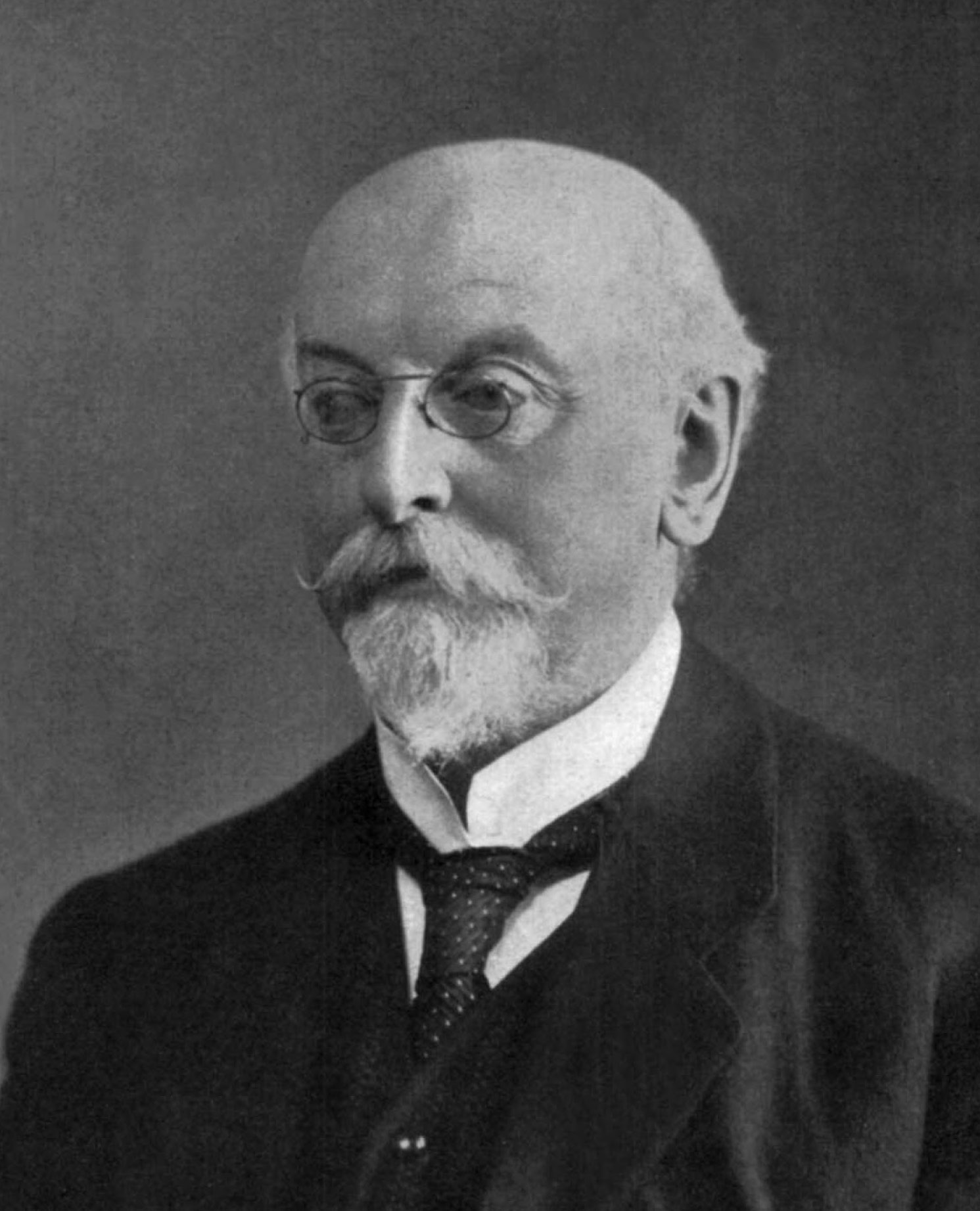
- Born: 29 March 1858
- Died: 18 April 1920 (aged 62)
- Scientific career
- Fields: Chemistry
- Workplaces: University of Sheffield

Lucius Trant O'Shea (18 March 1858 – 29 April 1920) was a British chemist and mining engineer; between 1908 and 1920 he acted as the general secretary of the Institution of Mining Engineers of Great Britain.

== Biography ==
O'Shea was the eldest son of Major R. P. O'Shea; he was also a grandson of admiral Lucius Curtis and a descendant from admiral Lord Rodney. He was educated at the Manchester Grammar School, and completed his chemical training at Owens College. Afterwards he acted as private assistant to C. Schorlemmer, and took part in the research on the constitution of aurine. Later he worked as chemist in an explosives factory.

When Firth College, Sheffield, was opened, Thomas Carnelley was appointed Professor of Chemistry and Physics. He selected O'Shea as his assistant lecturer and demonstrator in chemistry in 1881. Later O'Shea held the post of lecturer in mining chemistry, and in 1907 he was appointed Professor of Applied Chemistry in the University of Sheffield. He remained affiliated with the university to the day of his death.

For several years O'Shea taught at coal mines of Derbyshire and the neighbourhood of Sheffield. He summarised the results of this experience in the book Elementary Chemistry for Coal Mining Students published in 1911, which was specially intended for students who had little or no preliminary knowledge of chemistry. O'Shea's most important contributions to pure chemistry are scientific articles on the "Constitution of Bleaching Powder "and " Preparation of Pure Iron". He also made a number of contributions on the applications of chemistry to mining problems, especially in connexion with explosions in coal mines, mining explosives, the by-products of coking, coal-washing, etc.

His work in connexion with mining brought him into intimate contact with a large number of prominent mining engineers. In 1905 he was elected Secretary of the Midland Institute of Mining, Civil, and Mechanical Engineers. In 1908 the Institution of Mining Engineers, which had for many years had its headquarters at Newcastle upon Tyne, decided to move to London; simultaneously, the institution was in many respects reorganised. As its general secretary died in 1907, this position was offered to O'Shea, which he assumed on 2 September 1908 and held until his death.

During the Second Boer War he went out to South Africa as a commanding officer. This experience of active service led to his being placed in command of the University contingent, which was formed in 1911, a position he retained for eight years. O'Shea was survived by a widow and one daughter.
