= Luz (name) =

Luz is a Portuguese and Spanish feminine given name and surname, meaning light. The given name is shortened from Nossa Senhora Da Luz, a Roman Catholic epithet of the Virgin Mary as "Our Lady of Light".

== People ==
=== Given name ===
- Luz Blanchet, Mexican television presenter
- Luz Casal (born 1958), Spanish singer
- Luz Dary Castro (born 1978), Colombian shot putter and discus thrower
- Luz García (born 1977), Dominican Republic model
- Luz Elena González (born 1974), Mexican actress
- Luz Escamilla (born 1977), American politician
- Luz Jiménez (1897–1965), Mexican model, educator, and storyteller
- Luz Jiménez (actress) (born 1934), Chilean actress
- Luz Magsaysay (1914–2004), First Lady of the Philippines
- Luz Maria Frias (born 1962), American attorney
- Luz Márquez (born 1935), Spanish actress
- Luz Pavon, Mexican model and fashion designer
- Luz Pozo Garza (1922–2020), Spanish poet
- Luz Ramos, Mexican television and film actress
- Luz María Zetina (born 1973), Mexican actress
- Luz Maria Zornoza (born 1994), Peruvian badminton player
- Luz Marina Zuluaga (1938–2015), Colmbian Miss Universe
- Luz Mely Reyes (born 1967/68), Venezuelan journalist, writer, and analyst

=== Nickname ===
- Luz Long (1913–1943), German long jumper

=== Other ===
- Luz (singer, born 1993) (1993–2025), Japanese singer

=== Surname ===
- Adriano Barbosa Miranda da Luz (born 1979), real name of Cape Verdean footballer Néné
- Aída Luz (1917-2006), Argentine actress
- Aluísio Francisco da Luz (1931–2020), real name of Brazilian footballer Índio
- Arturo R. Luz (1926–2021), Filipino visual arts artist
- Carlos Coimbra da Luz (1894–1961), Brazilian politician
- Consuelo Luz, Chilean-Cuban singer of Sephardic, Mapuche and Basque origins
- Diego Luz (born 1990), Uruguayan footballer
- Dora Luz, Mexican Singer
- Emerson da Luz (born 1982), Cape Verdean footballer
- Franc Luz (born 1950), American actor
- Hugo Luz (born 1982), Portuguese footballer
- Jesus Luz (born 1987), Brazilian model and DJ
- Joaquín De Luz (born 1976), Spanish ballet dancer
- José Fágner Silva da Luz (born 1988), a.k.a. Fágner, Brazilian football player
- José La Luz (born 1950), Spanish activist
- Laura Luz (born 1967), Mexican stage and television actress
- Luiz Luz (1909–1998), Brazilian footballer
- Melânia Luz (1928–2016), Brazilian sprinter
- Rafa Luz (born 1992), Brazilian basketball player
- Rosa Luz Alegría (born 1949), Mexican physicist
- Sandro Gomes da Luz (born 1973), Brazilian football player
- Ulrich Luz (1938–2019), Swiss theologian
- Valentin Luz (born 1995), German pararower

== Fictional characters ==
- Luz Avalos, a character in the Saints Row franchise
- Luz Benedict, older sister of "Bick" Benedict in Edna Ferber's 1952 novel and 1956 film Giant
- Luz Noceda, protagonist of the 2020 American animated series The Owl House
- Luz "Lucita" Perez, a deaf character who uses cochclear implants from the 2024 American animated show Primos

== See also ==
- Luz (disambiguation)
- Luce (name)
- Lucy
