= Lūcija Jēruma-Krastiņa =

Latvian anatomist and anthropologist

- Born: Lūcija Krastiņa; 12 November 1899; Cēsis, Latvia
- Died: 23 September 1968 (aged 68); Caracas, Venezuela
- Occupations: anatomist and anthropologist

Lūcija Jēruma-Krastiņa (12 November 1899 – 23 September 1968) was a Latvian anatomist and anthropologist, and one of the first women to be awarded a doctorate from a Latvian university.

== Biography ==
Lūcija Jēruma-Krastiņa was born Lūcija Krastiņa on 12 November 1899 Cēsis. In 1925 she graduated from the University of Latvia Faculty of Medicine. She worked as an assistant to Jēkabs Prīmanis. From 1925 to 1944, she lectured in the University Department of Anatomy. Her theories on the race of the Latvians was used to create a particularly racial determination of the Latvian "race" from the 1930s onwards.

In 1944 she emigrated to Germany, and then in 1948 moved to Venezuela. Whilst in Venezuela she also started to paint. She was married to a psychiatrist Nicholas Jēruma.
