= Lucie Baud =

French trade unionist and silk worker (1870–1913)

- Born: 23 February 1870; Saint-Pierre-de-Mésage, Isère, France
- Died: 7 March 1913 (aged 43); Tullins, Isère, France
- Occupations: Trade unionist, silk worker

Lucie Baud (23 February 1870 – 7 March 1913) was a French trade unionist and silk worker who led the local silk workers' union in Vizille, France and organized strikes for better wages.

== Early life ==
Baud was born in 1870 to a working-class family in Saint-Pierre-de-Mésage, a village in southeastern France. When she was 12, she worked at the Durand Frères (transl. Durand Brothers) weaving mill in the nearby town of Vizille with her mother. In 1891, when she was 21 years old, she married a member of the rural guard, and together they had three children, one of whom died as an infant. Her husband, who was twenty years older than her, died in 1901.

== Trade unionism ==
Starting in 1902, Baud became an active trade unionist and labor organizer. With the help of members of the Bourse du Travail (transl. Labor Exchange) in Grenoble, she founded a trade union called the Syndicat des ouvriers et ouvrières en soierie du canton de Vizille (transl. Vizille Silk Workers' Union). While serving as secretary of this local silk workers' union, Baud opposed wage cuts as new machinery was introduced to weaving mills, and she was critical of the internats or boarding school structure for weaving mills, which isolated young girls from one another and hindered their ability to band together in solidarity. She also participated in the national congress of silk workers in Reims in 1904.

In 1905, Baud led a strike of women workers against a 30% wage cut at the Duplan factory. The strike lasted for four months and ended in a compromise. However, she faced retaliation for her activism and was fired from her job.

After her dismissal from Duplan, she moved to Voiron and starting working at another weaving mill. The following year, with the support of unions in Grenoble and Lyon, she participated in a successful general strike that led to improved working conditions for silk workers throughout the region.

== Later life and death ==
In September 1906, after a wave of strike actions and marches, Baud tried to commit suicide with a pistol. She survived and was left with severe injuries. Later, she said she had been facing difficulties with her family. She also wrote about her experiences as a worker in the weaving mills. She died in Tullins seven years later.

== Legacy ==
Actress Virginie Ledoyen portrays Baud in the French television film Mélancolie Ouvrière (2017). The film is based on the research of historian Michelle Perrot, published under the same title.
