= Lucio Maria Attinelli =

Italian journalist and writer

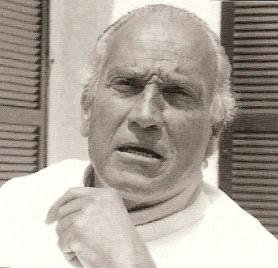
Lucio Attinelli in 1999

Lucio Maria Attinelli (born on 4 August 1933 in Palermo, Sicily) is a journalist and an Italian writer.

== Biography ==
As a journalist, Lucio Maria Attinelli has been the correspondent of the Italian periodicals in Paris: Il Mondo, La Fiera Letteraria, L’Europeo, Gente.

With Italo Calvino, Dino Buzzati, Stefan Themerson, André Pieyre de Mandiargues amongst others, he has collaborated in the international literary review Il Caffé, created and managed by G. Vicari.

His encounters with Ezra Pound, Julio Cortázar, Alberto Giacometti, Jean Genet and his letters to the Editor in Paris during May 1968 in France were used as references in Italy.

He has collaborated in France to the daily newspapers Le Figaro and Combat as well as to the literary review Les cahiers des saisons, managed by Jacques Brenner and Bernard Frank.

Lucio Maria Attinelli was a senior official of diplomatic rank in the UNESCO. From 1962 to 1991 he successively holds the high offices of Assistant to the Information Department Editor- in-Chief, Deputy Co-ordinator of the « United Nations’ project for the integral study of the Silk Roads, Roads of dialogue » and finally he initiated and lead the Public Relations and Special Events Division till he left the Organization. Within this scope we owe him, between others initiatives, the media launching of the Worldwide campaign for the Venice safeguard. Vermeil Medal (1976).

Lucio Maria Attinelli, whose characteristic is to write directly in French, is author of many cinema scenarii, two anthologies of poems, a few tales and seven novels.

== Works ==
- Les Barons de Palerme, Acropole, 1982.
- Ouverture Sicilienne, Robert Laffont, 1992, et Le Livre de Poche, 1997.
- La Gondole Blanche, Robert Laffont, 1994.
- La chute de l’épervier, Robert Laffont, 1997, et Le Livre de Poche, 1998.
- Une saison sicilienne, Flammarion, 2000.
- Paradis d’Orages, Fayard, 2003.
- Un Sicilien à Paris, Fayard, 2005.
- For the André Sauret Publishing he wrote the French version of Giorgio Soavi: Giacometti.
- Parfum de Sicile, Amazon, 2020.
- Vertige, Amazon, 2020.
- Un jour Shéhérazade, Amazon, 2021.

== Filmography ==
- 1972 : Les Voraces from Sergio Gobbi with Helmut Berger, Françoise Fabian and Paul Meurice, Script : Lucio Attinelli and Vahé Katcha
- 1975 : Blondy from Sergio Gobbi with Bibi Andersson and Rod Taylor, Script and dialogues : Lucio Attinelli

== Literary Prizes ==
- Talamone Prize in 1983 with Leonardo Sciascia for his literary activities;
- In 2003 finalist for the international prize « Ostia/Roma », under the auspices of the President of the Italian Republic, for his novel Una stagione a Palermo (Sellerio, publisher).

== International Commitment ==
Lucio Maria Attinelli has been the creator and general co-ordinator of the thoughts and studies program Unesco-Nouveau Millénaire at the origin of the Declaration of Human Duties and Responsibilities at which were participating : Umberto Eco, Michel Serres from the Académie Française, Maurice Aymard from the Maison des sciences de l’homme, Dario Fo, Nobel Prize in Literature, Arthur Miller, Sir Peter Ustinov and Wole Soyinka, Nobel Prize in Literature, Adolfo Perez Esquivel, Nobel Peace Prize.

In 1990 the UNESCO presented him the instrument of "High recognition for his 28 years ‘contribution to the international Cooperation and Peace".

== Visual Arts ==
Recently, partly quitting his literary activity, Lucio Maria Attinelli has devoted on painting and sculpture. The expert view is that his works, inspired by the « Soul Art » of which he takes his inspiration from, are successfully accomplished. Between these let's quote:

- Hommage à Marilyn
- 11 septembre
- Mai 68 et le suivant
- Aphrodite now
- Phéromones connexion
- Phéromones explosion
- C’era una volta Roma
- S.d. B : La deuxième vie du deuxième sexe
