= Lucie Hammecke =

German politician (born 1996)

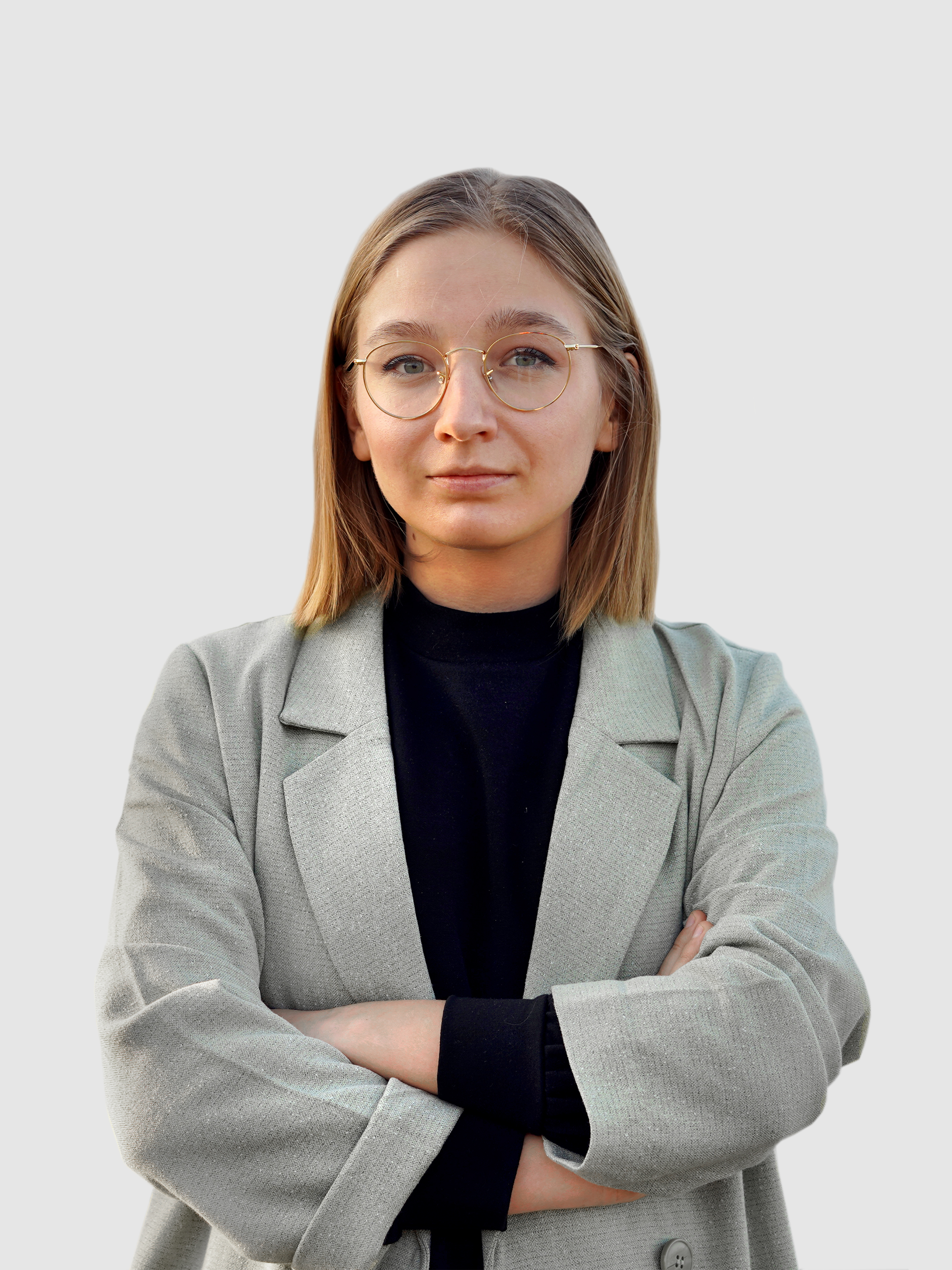
- Hammecke in 2021

Member of the Landtag of Saxony
- In office 1 October 2019 – 1 October 2024

Personal details
- Born: 8 October 1996 (age 29)
- Party: Alliance 90/The Greens (since 2017)

Lucie Hammecke (born 8 October 1996) is a German politician. From 2019 to 2024, she was a member of the Landtag of Saxony. She was the youngest member of the Landtag elected in the 2019 state election.
