= Lucija =

Lucija (Croatian pronunciation: [lǔcija]) is the Croatian and Slovenian form of the feminine given name Lucy.

In Croatia, the name Lucija was the most common feminine given name between 2000 and 2011.

The name is of Latin origin and means "light".

Notable people with the name include:

- Lucija Bešen (born 1998), Croatian handball player
- Lucija Ćirić Bagarić (born 2004), Croatian tennis player
- Lucija Čok (born 1941), Slovene linguist
- Lucija Larisi (born 1975), Slovenian biathlete
- Lucija Lesjak (born 1999), Croatian karateka
- Lucija Mlinar (born 1995), Croatian volleyball player
- Lucija Mori (born 1988), Slovenian footballer
- Lucija Polavder (born 1984), Slovenian judoka
- Lucija Radovčić, birth name of Lulu Sun (born 2001), New Zealand tennis player
- Dragana Lucija Ratković Aydemir (born 1969), Croatian art historian
- Marija Lucija Stupica (1950–2002), Slovene children's book illustrator
- Lucija Šerbedžija (born 1973), Croatian actor and model
- Lucija Zaninović (born 1987), Croatian taekwondo practitioner

== See also ==
- Lucia (name)
- Luca (feminine given name)
- Luce (name)
