= Luca (feminine given name) =

- Pronunciation: Croatian: [lǔːtsa] Hungarian: [ˈlutsɒ]
- Gender: Female
- Language: Croatian, Hungarian

Origin
- Origin: Latin
- Meaning: "Light"

Other names
- Related names: Lucy, Lucia, Lucija

Luca is used in Hungary and Croatia as a feminine given name. In Eastern Europe and particularly the Balkans, the cognate masculine name is Luka.

== People ==
- Luca Ekler (born 1998), Hungarian athlete
- Luca Homonnai (born 1998), Hungarian Olympic athlete
- Luca Ivanković (born 1987), Croatian basketball player
- Luca Kozák (born 1996), Hungarian athlete
- Luca Sardelis (born 2001), Australian actress of Greek descent
- Luca Udvardy (born 2005), Hungarian tennis player
- Luca Yupanqui, musical contributor to the album Sounds of the Unborn

== Fictional characters ==
- Luca Lomans, a recurring character in the Belgian series wtFOCK
- Luca (Yu-Gi-Oh! 5D's), from the Yu-Gi-Oh! 5D's anime series
- Luca (Final Fantasy character), the princess of the Dwarves in the video game Final Fantasy IV

== See also ==
- Luca (masculine given name)
- Lucija
- Luce (name)
