= Diego Luz =

Uruguayan footballer (born 1990)

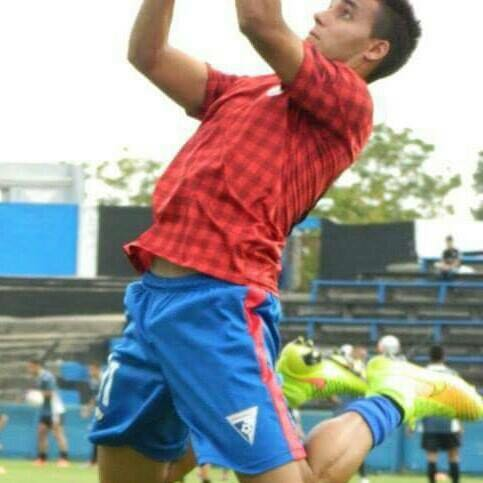

Diego Alexander Luz Pizarro (born 3 July 1990) is an Uruguayan professional footballer who played for Club Sportivo Miramar Misiones, Club Atlético Rentistas, Central Español Fútbol Club and Huracán del Paso de la Arena. Known for playmaking skills, range of passing and crossing ability, bending free-kicks with both legs and head goals. Since 2017 he plays for Huracán Buceo.

== Early life ==
Luz was born in Montevideo, Uruguay. He is the son of Silvia Pizarro and Wilmen Luz. He has two younger brothers Claudio and Nahuel Luz. He regularly played football as a child, and attended Portones Primary School and Jose Pedro Varela High School.

== Early career ==
Luz's professional club career began with Miramar Misiones, where he made his first-team debut in 2007 at the age of 17. He played for two seasons with Miramar Misiones, contributing to the promotion to First Professional League.

He then played one season with Rentistas, winning the championship of the Second League and getting the promotion to the First Professional League. He also played one season with Central Español and three seasons with Huracán del Paso de la Arena. In 2017, he plays for Huracán Buceo.
