= Lucie Berger =

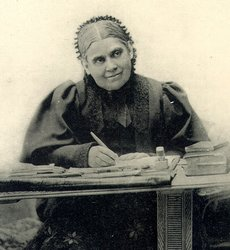
Lucie Berger (1836–1906)

Lucie Berger (15 April 1836 – 8 March 1906) was a pioneer for the education of girls in France.

Lucie Berger was born into a progressive family, the publishers Berger-Levrault, being the sixth child of the lawyer Frédéric Berger and Eléonore Levrault. When Lucie was one year old, her father died and her mother took over the family printing business, which already had some 200 employees. Her brother, the philatelist Oscar Berger-Levrault, took over the business in 1850.

In 1866 Lucie began working as secretary to the committee of the Strasbourg Deaconesses. In 1871, with the help of the Deaconesses, Lucie opened an institute for young middle-class girls, in a building bought from the Catholic institution the Bon Pasteur (the Good Shepherd) and became its first director. The school retained the name 'Bon Pasteur'. This building now serves as a clinic – the "Clinique des diaconesses", which is adjacent to the current premises of the school.

Beginning with 16 boarders and one day-pupil, the school grew rapidly. By 1873 there were 30 boarders and 28 day-pupils and by 1890 there were 16 separate classes. It was the first private school in Strasbourg to offer a secondary education diploma. In 1896 Lucie Berger added a gymnasium to the school, reflecting her conviction of the importance of physical education. By 1910 there was 600 pupils.

In 1918, when Alsace returned to France, the school was renamed Collège Lucie Berger. In 2005 it merged with the Jean Sturm Gymnasium, under the name 'Pôle éducatif Jan-Amos-Comenius', thus becoming the largest private Protestant educational institution in France.
