= John Luce =

John Luce may refer to:

- John Luce (bishop) (died 1370), bishop of Dunkeld
- John Luce (Royal Navy officer) (1870–1932)
- John V. Luce (1920–2011), Irish classicist and professor
- John G. Luce (1862–1935), American banker and politician
