= Giovanni Luca Lucci =

Italian painter (1637–1740)

Giovanni Luca Lucci (1637-1740) was a painter of the Baroque period, active near his native Fabriano in the Region of the Marche then part of the Papal States.

He trained with Andrea Carlone for 14 years in Rome. In 1696, he painted frescoes for the tombs of the Beato Giovanni del Bastone in the church of San Benedetto in Fabriano. His son was the painter Giovanni Ulisse Lucci (active 1717-1760s) also of Fabriano.
