= Lucius (disambiguation) =

Lucius is a given name and a surname in various languages.

Lucius may also refer to:

- Lucius (praenomen), a Latin praenomen in ancient Rome
- Lucius (play), a 1717 work by Delarivier Manley
- Lucius (band), an American four-piece indie pop band founded in 2007
  - Lucius (album), 2025

== Zoology ==
- Labeobarbus lucius, a species of ray-finned fish in the genus Labeobarbus
- Channa lucius, a species of snakehead, a fish of the family Channidae
- Esox lucius, known simply as a pike, a species of carnivorous fish of the genus Esox
- Ptychocheilus lucius, the largest cyprinid fish of North America
- Rhamphochromis lucius, a species of fish in the family Cichlidae

== Other uses ==
- Lucius Clapp Memorial, historic memorial in Stoughton, Massachusetts
- Lucius Knowles House, historic house in Worcester, Massachusetts
- Lucius Gleason House, also known as Liverpool Village Hall, in Liverpool, New York
- Lucius (horse), a racehorse who won the 1978 Grand National
- Lucius Hunt, Australian progressive alternative rock band (formed in late 2005)
- The Lucius Beebe EP, a 2007 5-song live mini-album by Trey Anastasio
- Lucius (video game), a 2012 video game

== See also ==
- Saint Lucius (disambiguation)
