= Lúcio Flávio =

Lúcio Flávio may refer to:

- Lúcio Flávio dos Santos (born 1979), a Brazilian footballer
- Lúcio Flávio da Silva Oliva (born 1986), a Brazilian footballer
- Lúcio Flávio Pinto (born 1949), a Brazilian journalist
- Lucio Flavio (film), a 1977 Brazilian film directed by Héctor Babenco
