= Luzio Luzi =

Italian painter

Luzio Luzi (sometimes Luzzi or Luci), also known as Luzio Luzi da Todi and Luzio Romano (died late 16th century), was an Italian painter, stuccoist, and draftsman of the High Renaissance era favoring the Mannerist style.

== Biography ==
Luzi was born in Todi, and started his painting career as an assistant to Perino del Vaga. He was mentioned by Giorgio Vasari in his Lives of the Most Excellent Painters, Sculptors, and Architects as one of Perino del Vaga's most important assistants, specializing in grotteschi and stucchi. He worked with del Vaga in Castel San Angelo, Rome, and in Palazzo Doria, Genoa. In 1545–1547, both del Vaga and Luzi were listed as master painters with a number of assistants.

When Perino died on 19 October 1547, Luzi began collaborating with another Tuscan painter, Daniele da Volterra, assisting him in the Vatican.

== Gallery ==
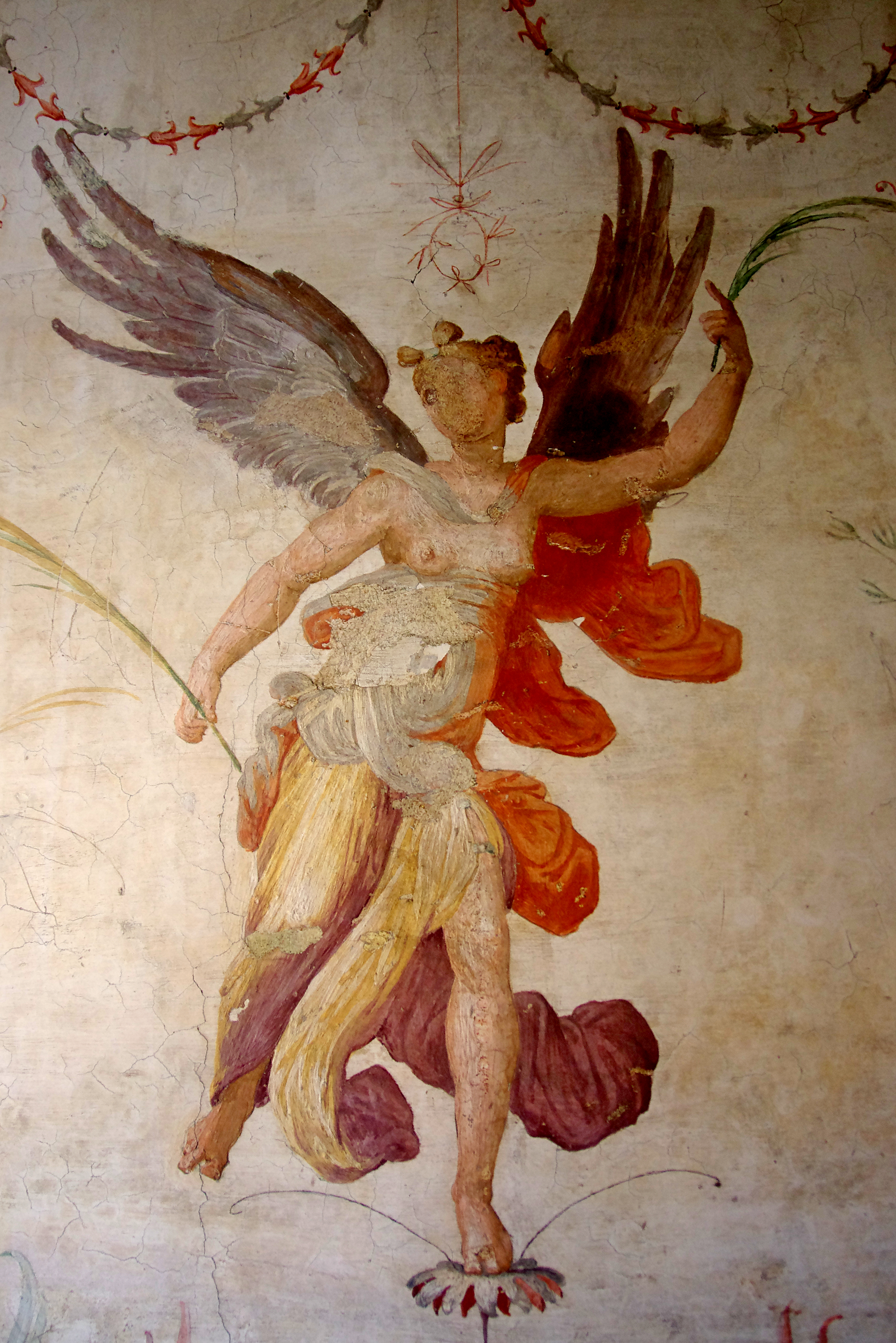
Castel Sant'Angelo, Rome

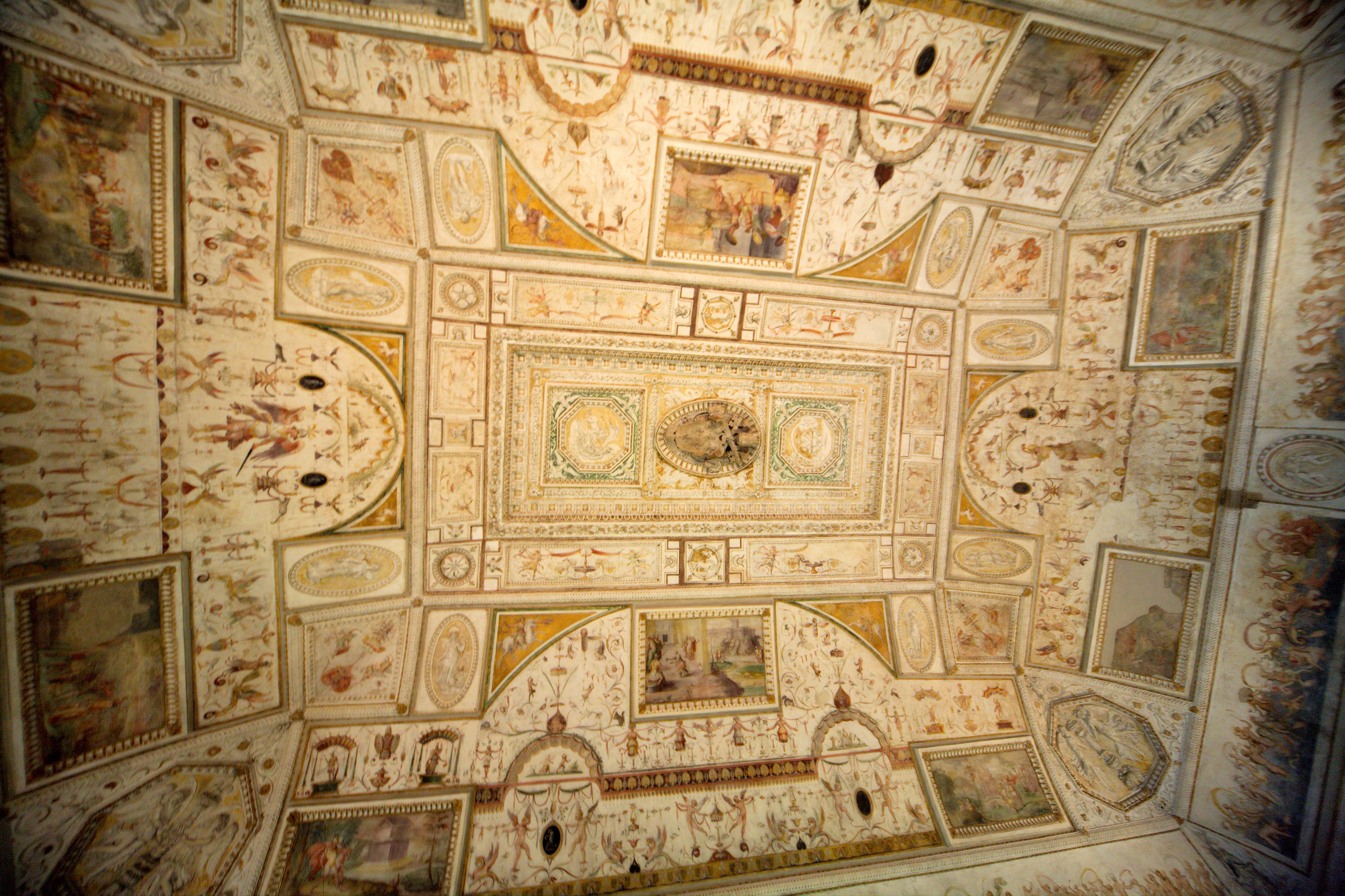
Castel Sant'Angelo, Rome

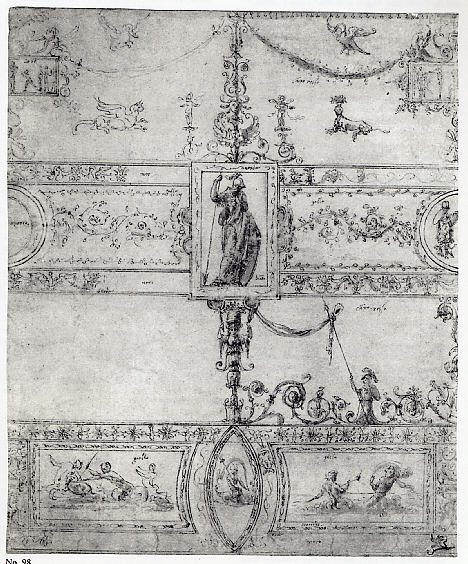
Design for a grotesque decoration, The MET

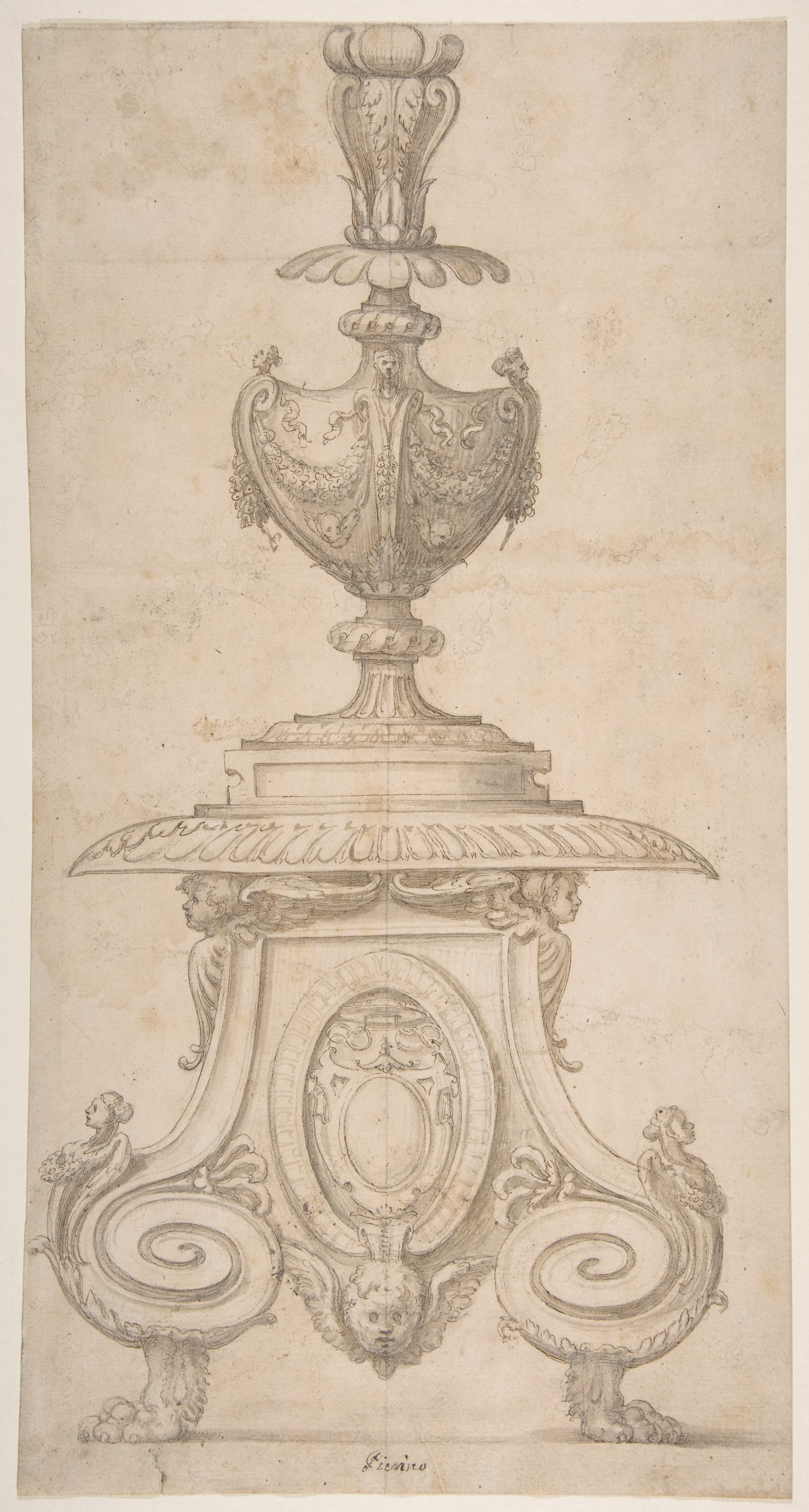
Design for a candlestick, The MET
