= Lucini =

Lucini may refer to:

== People ==
- Anton Francesco Lucini (c. 1610 – after 1661), Florentine engraver
- José Roberto Lucini (born 1981), known as Zé Roberto, Brazilian footballer
- Giovanni Battista Lucini (1639–1686), Italian painter

== Fiction ==
- Ben Lucini, a character on the Australian soap opera Home and Away
- Carly Lucini (née Morris), a character from the Australian soap opera Home and Away

== See also ==
- Lusiny, a village in Gmina Bartoszyce, Warmian-Masurian Voivodeship, Poland
