= Lucio Diodati =

Italian painter (born 1955)

Lucio Diodati (born 1955) is an Italian painter.

== Biography ==
He was educated at the Academy of Fine Art in L'Aquila, Italy. Diodati's work has mainly been exhibited in the United States and Italy. His first paintings were exhibited in 1980. In 2002 he went to Cuba to get cultural inspiration for his work. This led to his working with clay and entering the world of sculpture.

It has been said that Dioati's artistic style is a mixture of cinema, theatre and painting, and that he is a perilous exponent of immoral irony. Diodati uses critical humor and a great deal of color in his paintings.
