= Luciana Castellari =

Italian former sprinter and hurler

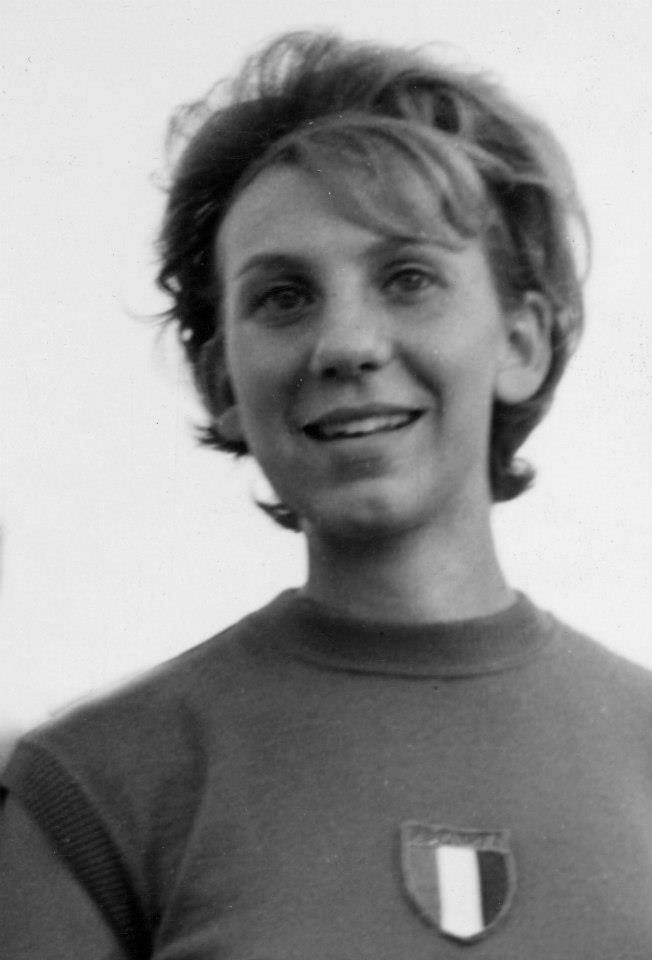
- Luciana Castellari in 1961, at the time of her first appearance in the national team

Personal information
- Nationality: Italian
- Born: August 12, 1943 (age 82) Cesena, Italy

Sport
- Country: Italy
- Sport: Athletics
- Event(s): Sprint; Hurdling
- Club: Fontana C.B.

Achievements and titles
- Personal bests: 80 m hs: 11.3 (1965); Shot put: 10.45 m; Long jump: 5.45 m; High jump: 1.55 m

Luciana Castellari (born 12 August 1943 in Cesena) is an Italian former sprinter (100 m) and hurler (80 m hs).

== Biography ==
In her career she won 1 time the national championships. She has 5 caps in national team from 1961 to 1965. She was in Italy national relay team and in the same club (Fontana C.B.), with her companion Donata Govoni from Bologna.

== National titles ==
- 1 win in 4 × 100 metres relay at the Italian Athletics Championships (1965)

== See also ==
- Donata Govoni
