= Lucille =

Lucille is a female given name of French origin and may refer to:

== People with the given name ==
- Lucille Roybal-Allard (born 1941), American politician
- Lucille Ball (1911–1989), American actress best known for the television series I Love Lucy
- Lucille Benson (1914–1984), American actress
- Lucille Berrien (1928–2026), American political activist
- Lucille Bliss (1916–2012), American actress
- Lucille Bogan (1897–1948), American singer and songwriter
- Lucille Bremer (1917–1996), American actress and dancer
- Lucille Carlisle (1895–1958), American actress
- Lucille Cavanagh (1895–1983), American dancer and singer
- Lucille Charuk (born 1989), Canadian volleyball player
- Lucille Collard, Canadian politician
- Lucille Teasdale-Corti (1929–1996), Canadian physician and pediatric surgeon
- Lucille Davy, former Commissioner of Education in New Jersey
- Lucille Desparois (1909–1996), Canadian author and radio personality
- Lucille Douglass (1878–1935), American painter, etcher, and lecturer
- Lucille Eichengreen (1925–2020), Holocaust survivor and memoirist
- Lucille Fletcher (1912–2000), American screenwriter
- Lucille George-Wout (born 1950), Curaçaoan politician
- Lucille C. Gunning (1921–2018), American pediatrician and medical services administrator
- Lucille Hamilton (born 1969), Australian basketball player
- Lucille Hegamin (1894–1970), American singer and entertainer
- Lucille Hutton (1898–1979), American actress
- Lucille Kallen (1922–1999), American writer, screenwriter, playwright, composer, and lyricist
- Lucy Lawless (born 1968), New Zealand actress
- Lucille Lemay (born 1950), Canadian archer
- Lucille Lisle (1908–2004), Australian actress
- Lucille Lortel (1900–1999), American actress, artistic director, and theatrical producer
- Lucille Lund (1913–2002), American actress
- Lucille P. Markey (1896–1982), American businesswoman and philanthropist
- Lucille Miller (1930–1986), Canadian murderer
- Lucille Mulhall (1885–1940), Wild West performer
- Lucille Nava (born 1966), Filipino politician
- Lucille Norman (1921–1998), American mezzo-soprano, radio personality, and actress
- Lucille Opitz (born 1977), German speed skater
- Lucille Ricksen (1910–1925), American actress of the silent film era
- Lucille Robedeaux (1915–2005), Native American tribal leader and the last surviving native speaker of the Osage language
- Lucille Soong (born 1935), Chinese-American actress
- Lucille Spann (1938–1994), American singer
- Lucille Starr (1938–2020), Canadian singer, songwriter, and yodeler
- Lucille Cole Thomas (1921–2019), American librarian
- Lucille Times (1921–2021), American civil rights activist
- Lucille Wall (1898–1986), American actress who played the role of Lucille March Weeks on the soap opera General Hospital
- Lucille Wallace (1898–1977), British-based American harpsichordist
- Lucille Wallenrod (1918–1998), American artist
- Lucille Werner (born 1967), Dutch television presenter and politician
- Lucille Whipper (1928–2021), American politician
- Lucille Young (1883–1934), American actress

== Fictional characters ==
- Lucille Anderson, a fictional character from the British period drama television series, Call the Midwife
- Lucille Austero, fictional character from the American television sitcom, Arrested Development
- Lucille Hewitt, fictional character from the British soap opera, Coronation Street
- Lucille LaRusso, fictional character from The Karate Kid franchise
- Lucille McGillicuddy, fictional character from the American television sitcom, I Love Lucy
- Lucy Van Pelt, fictional character in the comic strip, Peanuts
- Dr. Lucille Robinson, fictional character from Meet the Robinsons.

== Places ==
- Lake Lucille, Alaska, United States
- Lucille Lake (Idaho), United States
- Lake Lucille, near Garibaldi British Columbia, Canada

== Music ==
- Lucille (guitar), the name given to many of B. B. King's guitars
  - Lucille (album), a 1968 album by B. B. King, or the title song referencing the guitars
- Lucille, a guitar played by Ryusuke, a character in the manga and anime series Beck, based on B. B. King's guitar
- Lucille, a 2010 album by The Vasco Era
- "Lucille" (The Drifters song), 1954
- "Lucille" (Little Richard song), 1957
- "Lucille" (Kenny Rogers song), 1977

== Other uses ==
- Lucille, a fictional cue stick used by Philip Banks in The Fresh Prince of Bel-Air episode "Banks Shot"
- Lucille, a fictional barbed wire-wrapped baseball bat wielded as a weapon by Negan in The Walking Dead franchise

== See also ==
- Lucile (disambiguation)
- Lucy (disambiguation)
- Lucille's Smokehouse Bar-B-Que, a restaurant chain in the United States
- "Goodbye Lucille Number 1", a 1986 song by Prefab Sprout
- "My Lucille", a 1985 song by B. B. King
