= Lucé, Orne =

Lucé
- Part of Juvigny Val d'Andaine
- Location of Lucé
- Location within France Location within Normandy
- Coordinates: 48°33′03″N 0°35′42″W
- Country: France
- Region: Normandy
- Department: Orne
- Arrondissement: Alençon
- Canton: Bagnoles-de-l'Orne
- Commune: Juvigny Val d'Andaine
- Area^{1}: 6.09 km^{2} (2.35 sq mi)
- Elevation: 154 m (505 ft)
- Highest elevation: 172 m (564 ft)
- Lowest elevation: 128 m (420 ft)
- Population (2022): 78
  - Density: 13/km^{2} (33/sq mi)
- Time zone: UTC+01:00 (CET)
  - Summer (DST): UTC+02:00 (CEST)
- Postal code: 61330
- ^{1} French Land Register data, which excludes lakes, ponds, glaciers > 1 km^{2} (0.386 sq mi or 247 acres) and river estuaries.

Lucé (French pronunciation: [lyse]) is a former commune in the Orne department in north-western France. On 1 January 2016, it was merged into the new commune of Juvigny Val d'Andaine. The Anglo-Norman family of the same name (de Lucy, anciently de Luci) derived from this French village.

== See also ==
- Communes of the Orne department
- Parc naturel régional Normandie-Maine
