= Lucchini =

Lucchini is an Italian surname. It may refer to:

People

- Alessia Lucchini (born 1978), Italian former synchronized swimmer
- Antonio Maria Lucchini (1690–c 1730), Italian librettist
- Arsène Lucchini (1922–1998), French ski jumper
- Aurelio Lucchini (died 1989), Uruguayan architectural historian
- Florian Lucchini (born 1981), French football player
- Franco Lucchini (1914 – 1943), Italian World War II pilot
- Giovanni Francesco Lucchini (1755 – 1826), Italian architect
- Giuseppe Lucchini (born 1952), Italian businessman
- Italia Lucchini (1918 – unknown), Italian sprinter
- Jake Lucchini (born 1995), Canadian ice hockey player
- Leo Oswald Lucchini (1927–1991), Canadian ice hockey player
- Luigi Lucchini (1919–2013), Italian businessman
- Stefano Lucchini (born 1980), Italian football player
- Vincenzo Lucchini (1925–1984), Swiss former sports shooter

Companies

- Gruppo Lucchini, an Italian steel company
- Lucchini Engineering, an Italian sports car constructor and racing team
- Lucchini RS, an Italian company

Fictional characters

- Francesca Lucchini in the cast of Strike Witches, created by Humikane Shimada
