= Johannes Lucius =

Dalmatian historian (1604–1679)

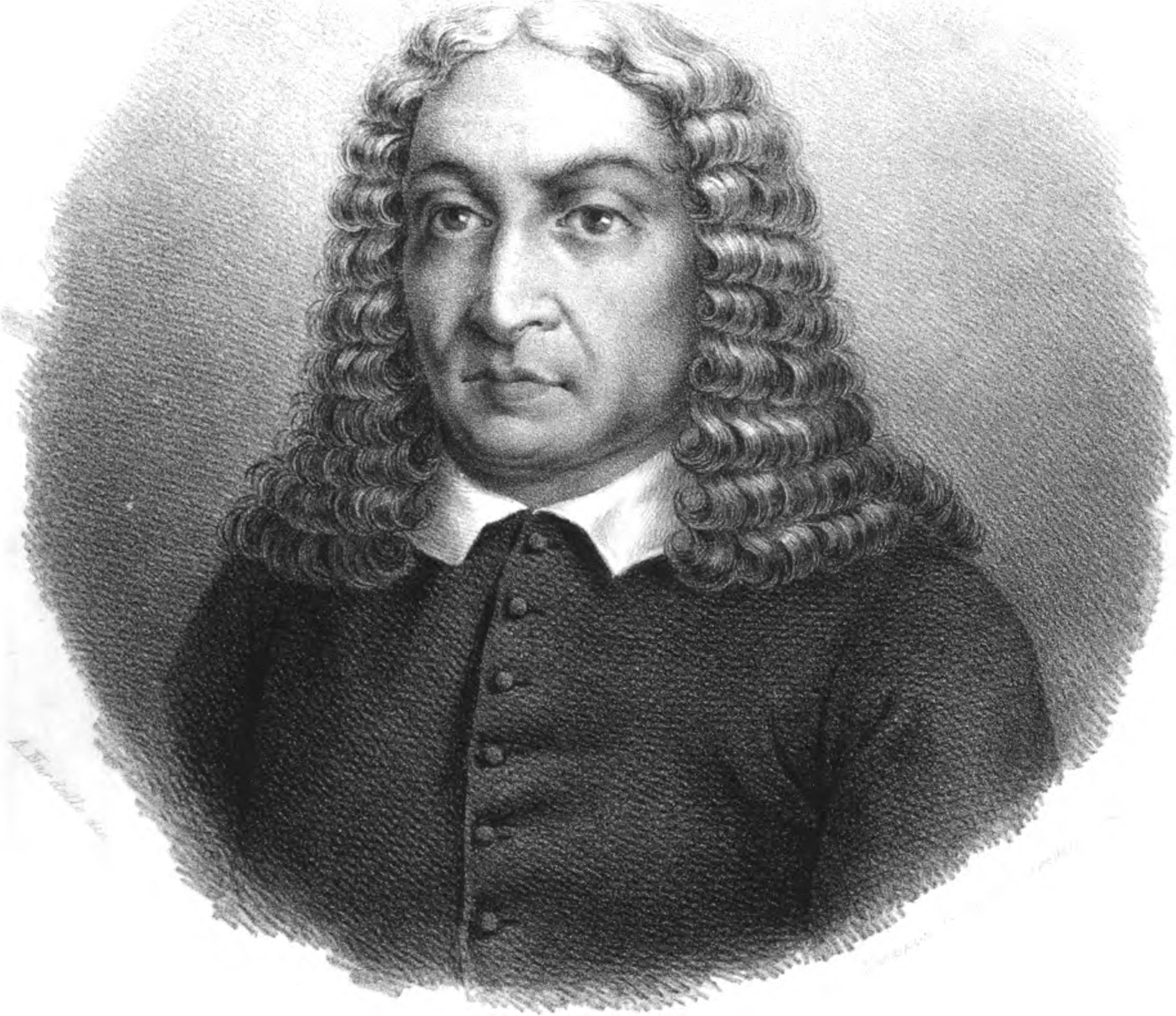
- Born: September 1604
- Died: 11 January 1679 (aged 74)
- Other names: Ivan Lučić; Giovanni Lucio; Ioannis Lucii; Joannes Lucio
- Citizenship: Republic of Venice
- Occupation: historian
- Notable work: De regno Dalmatiae et Croatiae ("On the Kingdom of Dalmatia and Croatia")

Johannes Lucius (Croatian: Ivan Lučić; Italian: Giovanni Lucio; September 1604 – 11 January 1679) was a Dalmatian historian, whose greatest work is De regno Dalmatiae et Croatiae ("On the Kingdom of Dalmatia and Croatia"), which includes valuable historical sources, bibliography and six historical maps. Due to his critical approach, he is often described as the "father of Croatian historiography".

He was a member of the Pontifical Croatian College of St. Jerome in whose catacombs he was buried after his death in January 1679.

== Life and works ==
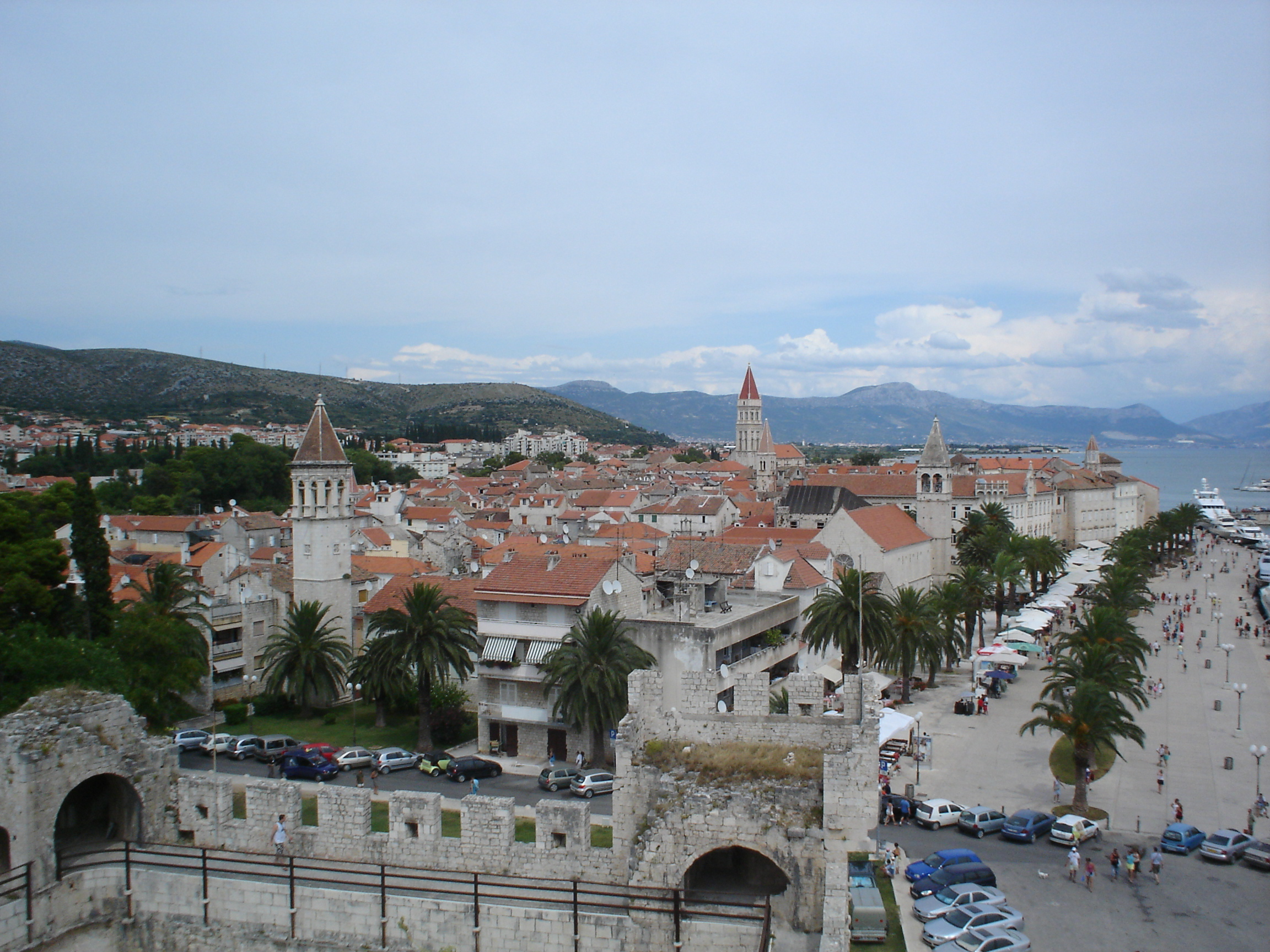
Trogir, birthplace of Johannes Lucius

Johannes was the son of Peter Lucius (Croatian: Petar Lučić) and Clara Difnico (Croatian: Klara Divnić), born in Trogir, Venetian Dalmatia (now Croatia). After some schooling in his hometown, he studied in Trogir and Rome, graduating in philosophy, mathematics, political sciences and literature in 1628. He then obtained his Ph.D. in ecclesiastical and civil law in the University of Padua. Following graduation, he worked as a councilman and judge in his hometown and developed intensive scientific research work. He returned to Rome in 1654. There he became a member of the Fraternity of Saint Jerome, and then its president. He participated in the work of many scientific academies of his age and wrote to scientists from Dalmatia, Italy and Europe.

He wrote a number of historical works in Italian and Latin. His first book Vita B. Ioannis confessoris episcopi Traguriensis et eius miracula [Life of St. John the Confessor, Bishop of Trogir] (1657) is an important source of Croatian, and especially Dalmatian, history between 11th and 13th centuries.

In the book Memorie istoriche di Tragurio ora detto Traù [Historical testimonies about Trogir, now called Traù], he described the history of Trogir and Dalmatia to the mid-15th century. The book Inscriptiones Dalmaticae [Dalmatian Inscriptions] (1673) contains inscriptions and epigraphic monuments from Dalmatian heritage.

His greatest and most famous work is De regno Dalmatiae et Croatiae (The Kingdom of Dalmatia and Croatia). It was first printed in Amsterdam in 1666. This book provides an overview of both, the history of Dalmatia and history of Croatia, from the prehistory to the 15th century. While his predecessors and contemporaries used suppositions as much as facts, Lucius founded his estimates on genuine sources. At the end of the book, he included certain valuable historical sources and a bibliography with his comments. The book had six historical maps. One of maps, the historical map Illyricum hodiernum (today's Illyria) was dedicated by Joan Blaeu, Lucius' publisher to the Croatian ban Petar Zrinski. Since everyone was looking up to antiquity, the Zrinski believed their ancestors were Roman aristocrats. Lucius showed them that their roots reached back to the famous medieval dukes of Šubićs noble family from Bribir. In his book Lucius pointed out the difference between the Romance and Slavic Dalmatia, the habits of the people and the cultural borderlines.

Lucius participated in the dispute about the authenticity of the text of Trimalchio's Banquet by the Roman satirist Petronius, which had been found in Trogir.

He also published a book of Roman inscriptions from Dalmatia, including the inscriptions collected by the famous Croatian poet and writer Marko Marulić. Shortly before his death, Lucius prepared the Statute and Reformations of the City of Trogir for printing, which was published in Venice by archdeacon Jerolim Cipiko.

Lucius was never married. He resided in Rome until his death and was buried there, in the Church of St. Jerome. A monument was erected to his memory in 1740.

== Significance ==
Johannes Lucius was the first Dalmatian historian who critically examined and used historical sources: documents and chronicles, inscriptions and last wills. His historical methodology was far ahead of his time.

He corresponded with many famous people from Republic of Ragusa (Dubrovnik), especially Stefano Gradi, the head of the Vatican Library. His numerous letters, revealing him as a man of integrity and a skillful writer are a valuable fresco of the conditions of his time.

Lucius' work, written in a lapidary and clear style, based on critical considerations, is the cornerstone of the modern historiography about Dalmatia. Today in Croatia, Lucius is considered the father of modern contemporary Croatian historiography.

== Works ==
The following are his principal published works:

- De Regno Dalmatiae et Croatiae libri sex (6 vols., Venice, 1673);
- Inscriptiones Dalmaticae, notae ad memoriale Pauli de Paulo, notae ad Palladium Fuscum, addenda vel corrigenda in opere de regno Dalmatiae et Croatiae, variae lectiones Chronici Ungarici manuscripti cum editis (Venice, 1673).
