= Luciana (given name) =

- Gender: Feminine

Origin
- Origin: Latin
- Meaning: Gracious light

Other names
- Related names: Lucius, Lucia

Luciana is a feminine given name of Roman origin, a variation of the masculine name Lucius. The name is especially popular in Argentina, Brazil, Italy, Portugal and Romania. In Hungarian the name is Luciána.

== List of people with the given name Luciana ==
- Luciana Abait, Argentine and U.S. installation artist
- Luciana Abreu, Portuguese singer and actress
- luciana achugar, Uruguayan American choreographer
- Luciana Arrighi, Italian production designer
- Luciana Aymar, retired Argentine field hockey player
- Luciana Berger, British politician
- Luciana Borio, American physician and public health administrator
- Luciana Braga, Brazilian actress
- Luciana Caporaso, British singer
- Luciana Carro, Canadian actress
- Luciana Castellari, Italian sprinter
- Luciana Castellina, Italian politician and journalist
- Luciana Curtis, Brazilian model
- Luciana Diniz, Portuguese equestrian
- Luciana dos Santos, Brazilian long jumper, triple jumper and sprinter.
- Luciana Duranti, Canadian professor
- Luciana Maria Dionizio, Brazilian footballer
- Luciana Fuster, Peruvian model, television personality, and beauty queen
- Luciana Frassati Gawronska, Italian writer
- Luciana Genro, Brazilian politician
- Luciana Geuna, Argentine journalist
- Luciana Gilli, Italian actress
- Luciana Gimenez, Brazilian fashion model and TV show hostess of Lebanese origin
- Luciana González Costa, Argentine actress
- Luciana Guindani, Italian canoeist
- Luciana Gurgel (born 1982), Brazilian politician
- Luciana Lamorgese, Italian civil servant and politician
- Luciana Littizzetto, Italian actress
- Luciana León, Peruvian politician
- Luciana Masante, Argentine tennis player
- Luciana Mello, Brazilian singer and professional dancer
- Luciana Mendoza, Argentine handball player
- Luciana Mocchi, Uruguayan singer and composer
- Luciana Molina, Argentine field hockey player
- Luciana Morales Mendoza, Peruvian chess player
- Luciana Nascimento, Brazilian volleyball player
- Luciana Novaes, Brazilian social worker and politician
- Luciana Paluzzi, Italian actress
- Luciana Pedraza, Argentine actress and director
- Luciana Pezzoni, Italian gymnast
- Luciana Popescu, Romanian handball player
- Luciana Ravizzi, Argentine ballerina
- Luciana Salazar, Argentine glamour model
- Luciana Salvadó, Argentine handball player
- Luciana Sandoval, Salvadoran television presenter
- Luciana Santos, Brazilian engineer and politician
- Luciana Santos de Lima, Brazilian singer and songwriter
- Luciana Savignano, Italian ballerina
- Luciana Sbarbati, Italian politician
- Luciana Serra, Italian soprano
- Luciana Sousa, Argentine writer
- Luciana Souza, Brazilian jazz singer and composer
- Luciana Tella, Brazilian tennis player
- Luciana Turina, Italian singer, actress and television personality
- Luciana Val, Argentine photographer

=== Fictional characters ===
- Luciana Mazzei, a character from the anime/manga Strike Witches
- Luciana, the daughter of Giovani who fell in love with Erik from Susan Kay's Phantom.
- Luciana, a character in the Joseph Heller novel Catch-22
- Luciana Galvez, a character from the television show Fear the Walking Dead
- Luciana Vega, American Girl character
