= Lucinda (given name) =

- Pronunciation: /ljuːˈsɪndə/
- Gender: Female

Origin
- Origin: Latin
- Meaning: "light"

Other names
- Related names: Lucia, Lucy, Cindy

Lucinda is a female given name of Latin origin, meaning light. It can be abbreviated as Lucy or Cindy. The name, which originated as an elaboration of the name Lucia, was first used for a character in Miguel Cervantes's 1605 work Don Quixote but was in use primarily in works of fiction in the 17th century. The variant "Lucinde" was used for a character by Molière in the 1665 farce Le Médecin malgré lui and later by Friedrich von Schlegel in the 1799 novel Lucinde. The name was well-used for girls in England by the 1700s and has been used since that time in the Anglosphere.

The name may refer to:

== People ==
- Lucinda Armstrong Hall, Australian actress
- Lucinda Ballard (1906–1993), American costume designer
- Lucinda Banister Chandler (1828–1911), American social reformer, author
- Lucinda Bruce-Gardyne, Scottish chef and writer
- Lucinda Collins, Australian pianist
- Lucinda Cowden (born 1965), actress on the Australian soap opera Neighbours
- Lucinda Creighton (born 1980), Irish politician
- Lucinda Foote, American student
- Lucinda Barbour Helm (1839–1897), American author, editor, women's religious activist
- Lucinda Jenney (born 1954), American actress
- Lucinda Deshaun Baines Johnson, the birth name of businesswoman and philanthropist Luci Baines Johnson
- Lucida Mansi (1606–1649), Italian noblewoman
- Lucinda Pullar (born 1998), commonly known as Lulu Pullar, Australian rules footballer and former soccer player
- Lucinda Riley (1965–2021), Northern Irish author and actress
- Lucinda Clark Severance (1843–1921), Hawaiian clubwoman
- Lucinda Hinsdale Stone (1814–1900), American feminist, educator, traveler, writer, philanthropist
- Lucinda Todd (1903–1996), African-American teacher and education activist
- Lucinda Williams (born 1953), American rock, folk and country music singer and songwriter
- Lucinda Williams (athlete) (born 1937), American athlete
- Lucinda Sanders (born 1954), commonly known as Lucy Sanders, CEO and co-founder of the National Center for Women & Information Technology

== Fictional characters ==
- Lucinda Walsh, a character on the CBS soap opera As the World Turns
- Lucinda Embry, a haunted girl who predicted apocalyptic events through numerology in the film Knowing
- Lucinda Leplastrier, the heroine from Peter Carey's 1988 novel Oscar and Lucinda
- Lucinda Merrill, wife of protagonist Neddy Merrill in John Cheever's 1964 short story "The Swimmer"
- Lucinda, a witch character in the television series Sofia the First
- Lucinda Allen, RJ's childhood crush, and later, his girlfriend, in the novel Welcome Home Roscoe Jenkins
- Lucinda Perriweather, a well-meaning but misguided and often unhelpful fairy who gave the "gift" of obedience to Ella in the film Ella Enchanted
- Lucinda Koppelthorn, a character from the video game Metal Gear Acid 2
- Lucinda "Lucy" Abernathy, the female protagonist, and love interest of Gregory Bridgerton, in the eighth and final book in the Bridgerton Series, On the Way to the Wedding

== Songs ==
- "Lucinda", by Tom Waits from the album Orphans: Brawlers, Bawlers & Bastards
- "Lucinda", by The Knack from the album Get the Knack
- "Lucinda", by post punk industrial funk band A Certain Ratio, from the album Sextet

== Others ==
- Lucinda, Queensland, a town in Australia
- Lucinda (steam yacht), a steam yacht of the Queensland Government
