= Lucile =

Lucile may refer to:

- Lucile (poem), an 1860 story in verse By Owen Meredith (Robert, Lord Bulwer-Lytton)
- Lucile, the couture house (and nickname) of early 20th-century fashion designer Lucy, Lady Duff-Gordon
- Lucile (opera), a 1769 opera by André Grétry
- Lucile (film), a 1927 French silent drama film

== People ==
- Lucile, pen name of Lucinda Barbour Helm (1839–1897), American author
- Lucile Abreu (1920–1996), American police detective
- Lucile Adams-Campbell (born 1953), American epidemiologist
- Lucile Allorge (born 1937), Madagascar-born French botanist
- Lucile Atcherson Curtis (1894–1986), American diplomatic service officer
- Lucile Blanch (1895–1981), American painter
- Lucile Bluford (1911–2003), American journalist and philanthropist
- Lucile Browne (1907–1976), American film actress
- Lucile Buchanan (1884–1989), American educator
- Lucile Carter (1875–1934), American socialite and RMS Titanic survivor
- Lucile Council (1898–1964), American landscape designer
- Lucile Cypriano (born 1996), French racing driver
- Lucile Desmoulins (1770–1794), French revolutionary, diarist, and author
- Lucile Eaves (1869–1953), American sociologist, university professor, and activist
- Lucile Eleanor St. Hoyme (1924–2001), American biological anthropologist
- Lucile Fairbanks (1917–1999), American actress
- Lucile Garner (1910–2013), Canadian flight attendant and nurse
- Lucile Gleason (1888–1947), American stage and screen actress
- Lucile Godbold (1900–1981), American track and field athlete
- Lucile Grahn (1819–1907), Danish ballerina
- Lucile Grétry (1772–1790), French composer
- Lucile Hac (1909–2006), American biochemist and microbiologist
- Lucile Hadžihalilović (born 1961), French writer and film director of Bosnian descent
- Lucile Henriette Mondutaigny (1826–1901), French singer
- Lucile Land Lacy (1901–1994), American painter and printmaker
- Lucile Lawrence (1907–2004), American harpist
- Lucile Lefevre (born 1995), French snowboarder
- Lucile Lloyd (1894–1941), American muralist, illustrator, and decorative painter
- Lucile Lomen (1920–1996), American law clerk
- Lucile M. Morsch (1906–1972), American librarian
- Lucile Morat (born 2001), French ski jumper
- Lucile Nix (1903–1968), American librarian
- Lucile P. Hicks (born 1938), American politician
- Lucile Quarry Mann (1897–1986), American writer, editor, and explorer
- Lucile Randon (1904–2023), French supercentenarian
- Lucile Saint-Simon (born 1932), French actress
- Lucile Saunders McDonald (1898–1992), American journalist, historian, and author
- Lucile Sayers (1887–1959), American-British political activist
- Lucile Schmid (born 1962), French politician
- Lucile Swan (1887–1965), American sculptor and artist
- Lucile Tessariol (born 2004), French swimmer
- Lucile Watson (1879–1962), Canadian-born American actress
- Lucile A. Watts (1920–2018), American judge
- Lucile Wheeler (born 1935), Canadian former alpine ski racer

== Places ==
In the United States

- Lucile, Georgia
- Lucile, Idaho
- Lucile, West Virginia

== See also ==
- Lucille (disambiguation)
- Lucia (disambiguation)
