= Carver Court =

Historic housing development in Pennsylvania, United States

- U.S. National Register of Historic Places
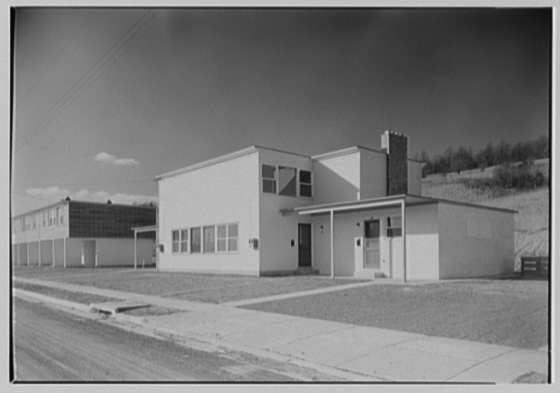

- Location within Pennsylvania Location within the United States
- Location: Foundry Street and Brooks Lane, near Coatesville, Caln Township, Pennsylvania
- Coordinates: 39°59′27″N 75°48′06″W
- Area: 66 acres (27 ha)
- Built: 1944
- Architect: Louis Kahn; Oscar Stonorov; George Howe
- Architectural style: International Style
- NRHP reference No.: 16000310
- Added to NRHP: May 31, 2016

Carver Court is a historic housing development located at Foundry Street and Brooks Lane near Coatesville in Caln Township, Chester County, Pennsylvania. Built in 1944 in the International Style, Carver Court is important to understanding the African American experience in Coatesville. The development was added to the National Register of Historic Places in 2016.

== Description and history ==
Federal authorities built Carver Court during World War II as public housing for African American steelworkers and families, who were critical to the wartime defense industry. Most residents worked at Lukens Steel Company and others worked at the Coatesville Veterans Administration Hospital or Embreeville State Hospital. A former race track forming a rough ellipse became a landscaped cul-de-sac around a communal open space, lined with 89 units of one- and two-story homes. These homes were modest but modern, featuring carports, designated storage, and yards to a degree uncommon in public housing. Carver Court is adjacent to the Coatesville Area High School and is separated from the town by the Lincoln Highway and Amtrak tracks.

Influential Modernist architects Louis Kahn, Oscar Stonorov, and George Howe designed Carver Court alongside numerous other buildings in the Philadelphia area. Carver Court was originally named the Foundry Street Defense Housing Project but was quickly renamed in honor of George Washington Carver following a naming contest at a local school. Carver Court was dedicated on September 4, 1944. A mix of single-family and multi-family homes, Carver Court's wooden buildings mostly have vinyl exterior sliding and gable or hip roofs, replacing the original beveled wooden sliding and flat roofs. Originally rentals, the homes were sold to private owners (offered first to current occupants) by the Federal Housing Administration in 1955.

== Racial segregation ==
Carver Court was a product of racial segregation. In 1942, the Coatesville city council had appealed for the construction of separate housing developments for black and white workers, and most federal housing projects were segregated at the time. Lincoln Highway Defense Housing (later Brandywine Homes) was another Coatesville federal housing project, built at the same time as Carver Court but designated for white steelworkers and their families. According to the Pennsylvania Historical and Museum Commission in 2016, "Research to date suggests that Carver Court and Brandywine Homes were built as separate segregated housing developments due to the long-standing history of racial tension that existed in the Coatesville area."

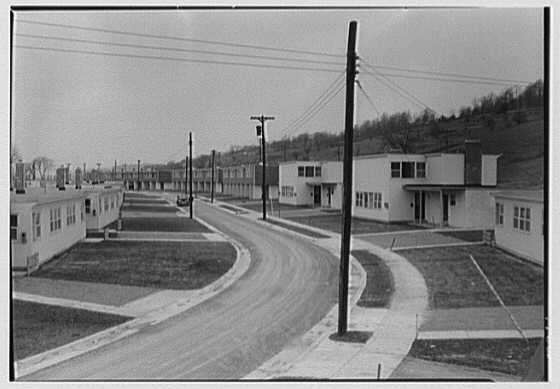

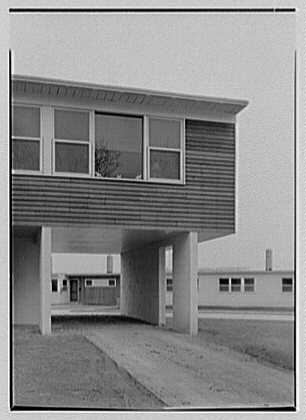

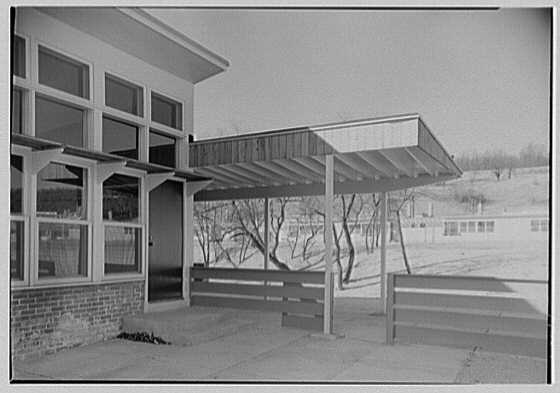
