= Caln, Pennsylvania =

Unincorporated community in Pennsylvania, US

- Census-designated place
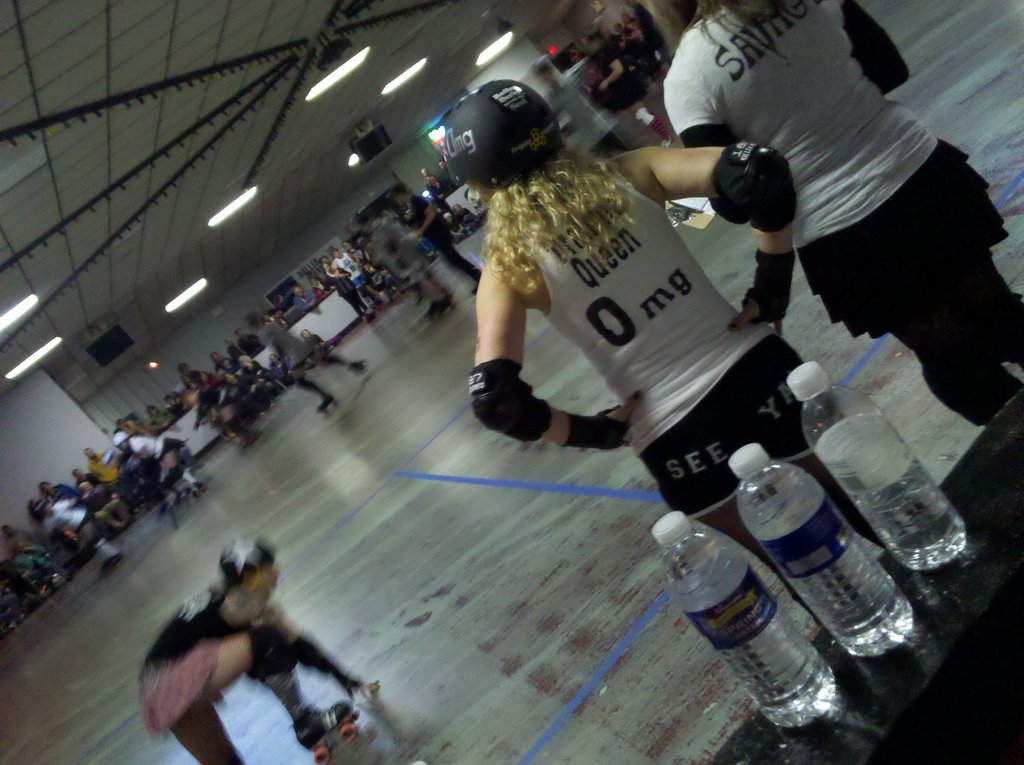
- Caln Roller Rink

- Location in Chester County and the state of Pennsylvania.
- Coordinates: 39°59′25″N 75°46′48″W
- Country: United States
- State: Pennsylvania
- County: Chester
- Township: Caln

Area
  - Total: 0.81 sq mi (2.09 km^{2})
  - Land: 0.80 sq mi (2.08 km^{2})
  - Water: 0.0039 sq mi (0.01 km^{2})
- Elevation: 345 ft (105 m)

Population (2020)
  - Total: 1,494
  - Density: 1,857.9/sq mi (717.33/km^{2})
- Time zone: UTC-5 (Eastern (EST))
  - Summer (DST): UTC-4 (EDT)
- ZIP Code: 19320 (Coatesville, Pennsylvania)
- Area code: 610
- FIPS code: 42-10816
- GNIS feature ID: 1170901

Caln is a census-designated place (CDP) in Caln Township, Chester County, Pennsylvania, United States. The population was 1,519 at the 2010 census. It is located east of the city of Coatesville and lies west of Philadelphia.

== Geography ==
Caln is located at 39°59′25″N 75°46′48″W. The Lincoln Highway, also known as U.S. Route 30 Business, forms the southern edge of the CDP. Caln CDP extends north as far as Pennsylvania Route 340. According to the U.S. Census Bureau, the CDP has a total area of 0.81 square miles (2.1 km^{2}), all land.

== Demographics ==
Historical population
Census	Pop.	Note	%±
2020	1,494		—
U.S. Decennial Census

== Education ==
The school district is Coatesville Area School District.
