= Caln Township, Pennsylvania =

Township in Pennsylvania, US

- Township
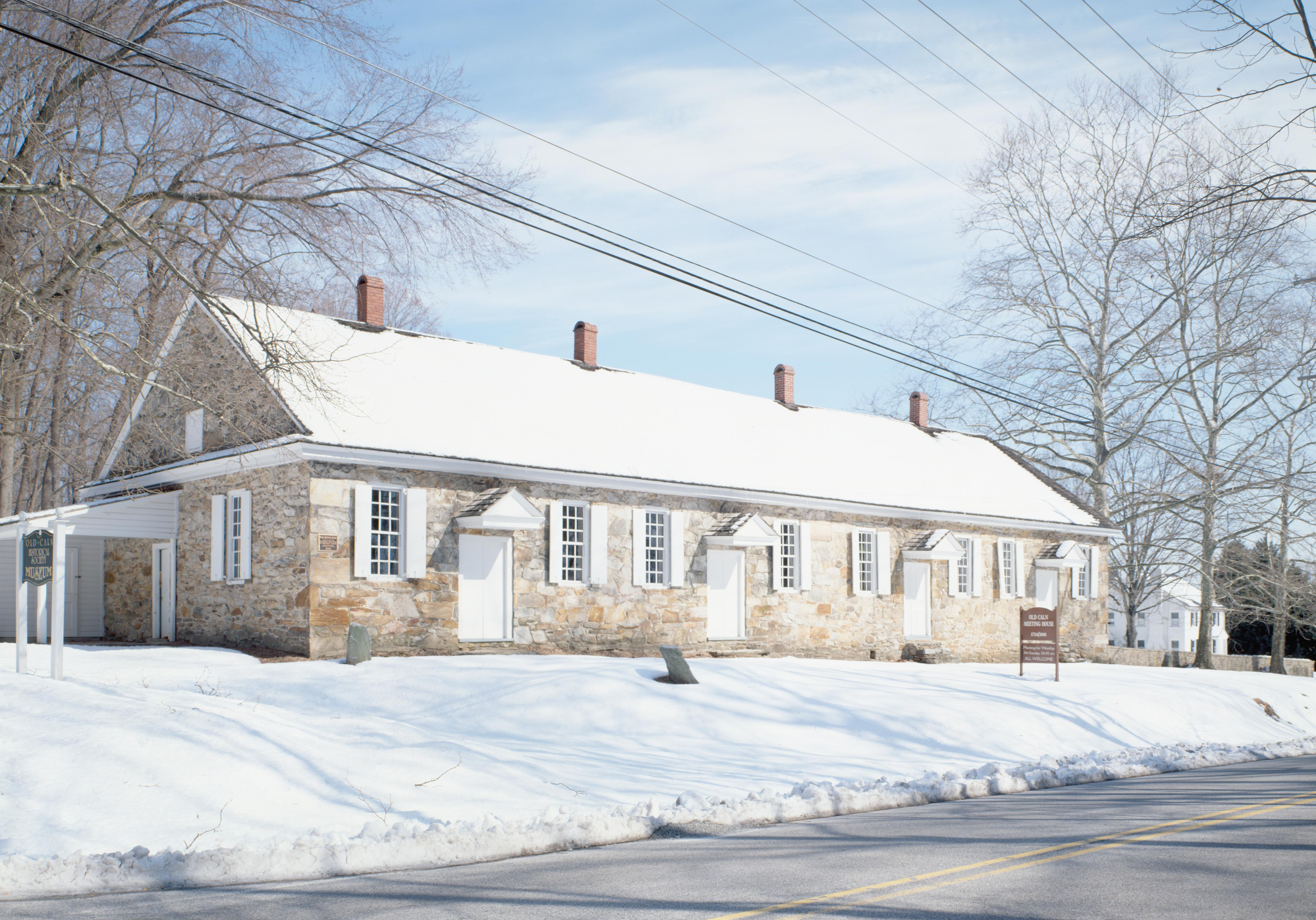
- Caln Meeting House

- Seal
- Motto: "The Heart of Chester County"
- Location of Caln Township in Chester County (left) and of Chester County in Pennsylvania (right)

- Location of Pennsylvania in the United States
- Coordinates: 39°59′51″N 75°46′09″W
- Country: United States
- State: Pennsylvania
- County: Chester
- Founded: 1714

Area
  - Total: 8.92 sq mi (23.09 km^{2})
  - Land: 8.86 sq mi (22.94 km^{2})
  - Water: 0.058 sq mi (0.15 km^{2})
- Elevation: 351 ft (107 m)

Population (2020)
  - Total: 14,432
  - Estimate (2025): 15,287 ▲
  - Density: 1,591.9/sq mi (614.62/km^{2})
- Time zone: UTC-5 (EST)
  - Summer (DST): UTC-4 (EDT)
- Postal codes: 19320 (Coatesville); 19335 (Downingtown); 19372 (Thorndale)
- Area code: 610
- FIPS code: 42-029-10824
- Website: www.calntownship.org

Caln Township (/kæln/ KAL-in) is a township in Chester County, Pennsylvania, United States. The population was 14,432 at the 2020 census. The township was founded by settlers from Calne, Wiltshire in England in 1714; the relationship between Caln and Calne continues in the present since the two are sister cities. Caln is a township of the First Class, and the governing body is a Board of Commissioners. Thorndale is the commercial and administrative center of the township. The township also owns Ingleside Golf Club and over 200 acres (0.81 km^{2}) of green space and parks.

Caln Township is part of Coatesville Area School District (CASD). The western end of the township along U.S. Business 30 is sometimes referred to as the Village of Caln. Historically, there were places referred to as Reeceville (northwestern corner), Ingleside (between Caln and Thorndale), Bondsville (north of Thorndale), and Galagherville (between Thorndale and Downingtown). The names of these communities have since fallen out of usage, except for local road names and CASD's Reeceville Elementary School.

== History ==
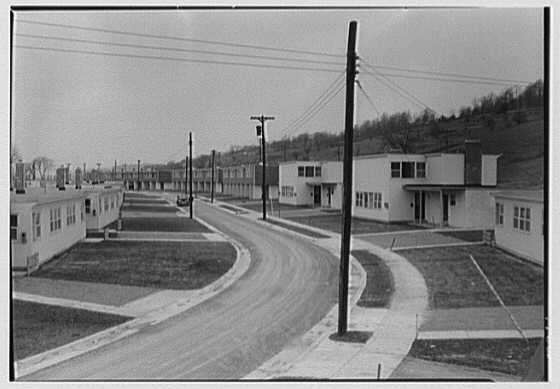
Carver Court in 1943

The Caln Meeting House, built in 1726, was listed on the National Register of Historic Places in 1984. The Coatesville VA Medical Center, built in 1929 and opened in 1930, was listed on the National Register of Historic Places in 2013. Carver Court, a historically African American housing development completed in 1944, was listed on the National Register of Historic Places in 2016.

== Geography ==
According to the United States Census Bureau, the township has a total area of 8.8 square miles (23 km^{2}), of which 0.11% is water.

Adjacent townships

- Valley Township (northwest)
- West Brandywine Township (northwest)
- East Brandywine Township (north)
- East Caln Township (northeast)
- West Bradford Township (south)
- East Fallowfield Township (southwest)

The City of Coatesville is on the west side of the township. Downingtown Borough is on the east side of the township. Both municipalities are politically independent.

== Demographics ==
Historical population
Census	Pop.	Note	%±
1930	1,676		—
1940	3,661		118.4%
1950	5,779		57.9%
1960	6,685		15.7%
1970	6,689		0.1%
1980	9,639		44.1%
1990	11,997		24.5%
2000	11,916		−0.7%
2010	13,817		16.0%
2020	14,432		4.5%
2025 (est.)	15,287		5.9%

At the 2020 census, the township had a population of 14,432. It is estimated that as of 2025, the population had grown 5.9% to 15,287.

At the 2010 census, the township was 72.8% non-Hispanic White, 16.2% Black or African American, 0.1% Native American, 3.9% Asian, 0.1% Native Hawaiian or other Pacific Islander, and 2.2% were two or more races. 5.5% of the population were of Hispanic or Latino ancestry.

At the 2000 census, there were 11,916 people, 4,363 households and 3,067 families residing in the township. The population density was 1,360.6 per square mile (525.3/km^{2}). There were 4,535 housing units at an average density of 517.8 per square mile (199.9/km^{2}). The racial make-up was 78.78% White, 15.76% African American, 0.19% Native American, 2.44% Asian, 0.05% Pacific Islander, 1.19% from other races and 1.59% from two or more races. Hispanic or Latino of any race were 3.24% of the population.

There were 4,363 households, of which 35.7% had children under the age of 18 living with them, 54.4% were married couples living together, 11.4% had a female householder with no husband present, and 29.7% were non-families. 22.9% of all households were made up of individuals, and 6.4% had someone living alone who was 65 years of age or older. The average household size was 2.60 and the average family size was 3.10.

25.5% (of the population were under the age of 18, 6.5% from 18–24, 35.0% from 25–44, 21.9% from 45–64, and 11.0% were 65 years of age or older. The median age was 36 years. For every 100 females there were 102.5 males. For every 100 females age 18 and over, there were 103.3 males.

The median household income was $60,198 and the median family income was $65,520. Males had a median income of $43,169 and females $33,193. The per capita income was $25,494. About 3.6% of families and 5.0% of the population were below the poverty line, including 6.6% of those under age 18 and 8.0% of those age 65 or over.

== Transportation ==
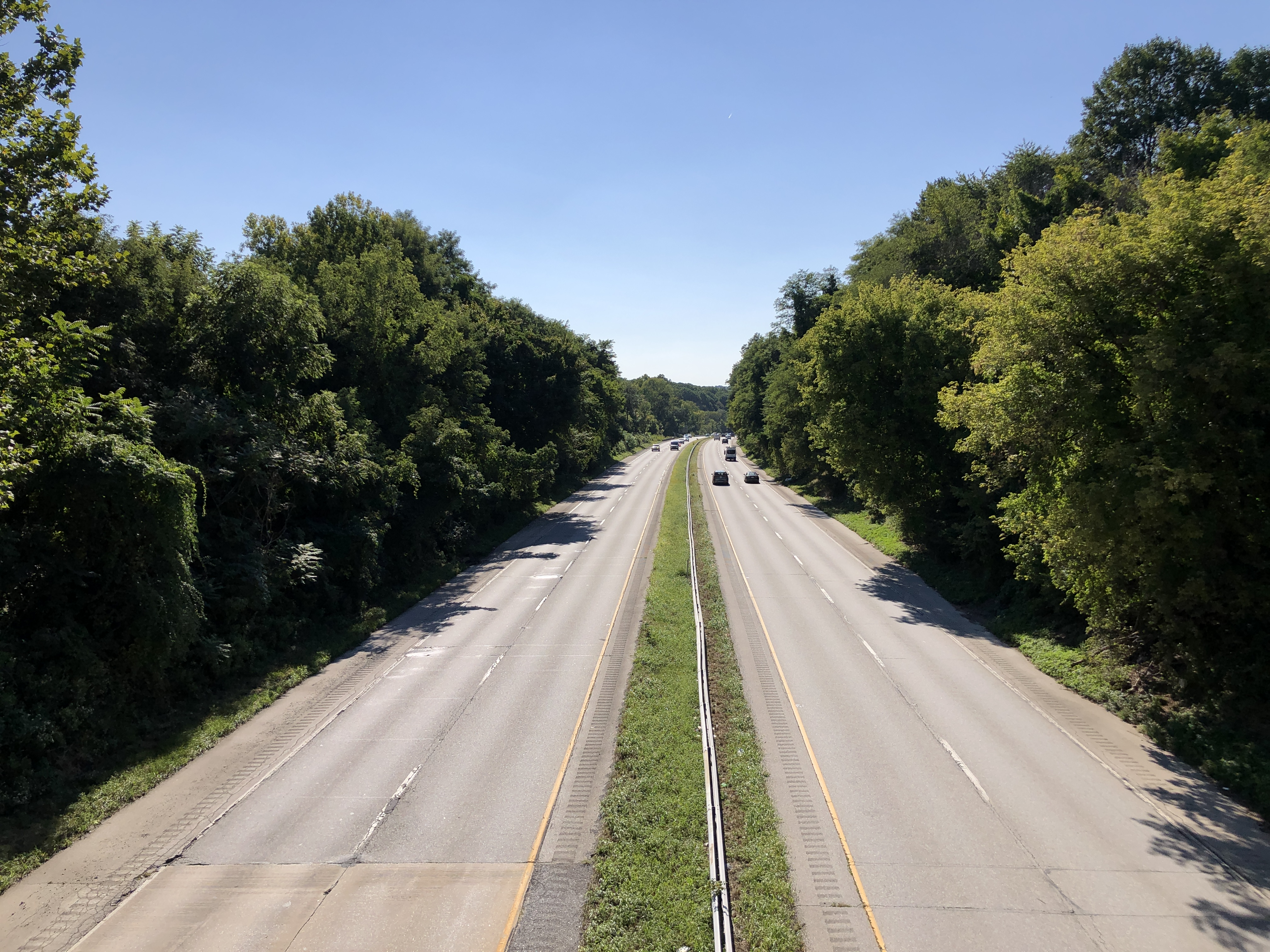
US Route 30 westbound in Caln Township

As of 2018, there were 72.70 miles (117.00 km) of public roads in Caln Township, of which 24.17 miles (38.90 km) were maintained by Pennsylvania Department of Transportation (PennDOT) and 48.53 miles (78.10 km) were maintained by the township.

U.S. Route 30 is the main highway serving Caln Township. It follows the Coatesville-Downingtown Bypass along a southwest–northeast alignment across the northern and northwestern portions of the township. U.S. Route 30 Business follows the old alignment of U.S. 30 along Lincoln Highway through southern and southeastern portions of the township. U.S. Route 322 follows Horseshoe Pike along a northwest–southeast alignment across the northeastern corner of the township. Pennsylvania Route 282 follows Creek Road across the northeastern corner of the township. Finally, Pennsylvania Route 340 follows Bondsville Road and Kings Highway along a generally east–west alignment from US 30 Business westward across central and western parts of the township.

Thorndale station, a SEPTA Regional Rail station, provides rail service to Philadelphia and other communities along the Main Line.

== Education ==
Coatesville Area School District is the public school district for the municipality. Coatesville Area High School (Coatesville Area Intermediate High School and Coatesville Area Senior High School) is located in the township.

The Chester County Intermediate Unit (CCIU) operates a Learning Center, a Child & Career Development Center, and a Toddler Center adjacent to the school district's high school campus in Caln Township.

Downingtown Middle School of the Downingtown Area School District (DASD) is physically in Caln Township, as is a part of Downingtown High School West. DASD does not serve Caln Township.

== Healthcare ==
Atop of a hill overlooking Coatesville and located in Caln Township, the historic Coatesville VA Medical Center (a major Veterans Administration hospital) provides care to approximately 20,000 Veterans in the region annually. The hospital serves Veterans in Chester County, Delaware County, and Montgomery County.

Brandywine Hospital, which was located in Caln Township, was abruptly closed in January 2022 by West Reading-based Tower Health after systemwide financial difficulties. The hospital primarily served the Coatesville area and other surrounding communities in central and western Chester County. In March 2025, the hospital campus was acquired by Mill Farm LLC, an affiliate of Regal Builders. The developer plans to preserve the hospital building and stated it would work with a healthcare provider to restore inpatient and emergency services to the area. Other plans for the former hospital campus include apartments, townhouses, senior living, offices, medical clinics, child care, retail, and restaurants.
