= Coatesville, Pennsylvania arsons =

2008–09 arson spree in Pennsylvania, US

The Coatesville, Pennsylvania arsons refer to a spree of deliberately set fires in 2008 and 2009 in the area of Coatesville, Pennsylvania, a small Philadelphia suburb. There were 26 fires set in Coatesville in the year 2008 and, since January 1, 2009, there have been 18 reported cases of arson in the city and five more in the surrounding area. The fires have caused more than $3 million in damage, left scores of people homeless and resulted in the death of one 83-year-old woman. As of March 2009, six people have been arrested in connection with some of the fires.

== Arsons ==
As of February 2009, there were 18 fires set in Coatesville, Pennsylvania and five in nearby surrounding areas since January 1, 2009. The city originally reported 15 cases of arson in 2008, but upon further investigation due to media requests for more information, the number of reported 2008 arsons was increased to 26. Coatesville, which is less than two square miles in size, receives about one or two arsons in a normal year. The fires have caused more than $3 million in damage so far.

"These offenses are probably the most serious crime spree that has occurred during the 30 years I've been with the district attorney's office."

— Joseph Carroll, Chester County District Attorney

By February, one death had been reported as a result of the arsons. Irene Kempest, an 83-year-old widow and Nazi war camp survivor, was killed due to smoke inhalation when her Strode Avenue home in Coatesville was set ablaze on December 7, 2008, at about 12:20 a.m. Emergency responders searching the building found Kempest was unconscious upstairs and removed her from the house, but she died in an area hospital the next day. The fire was one of four set between December 6 and December 9 alone. George Donkewicz, 22, was arrested for setting the fire that killed Kempest and an additional fire from December 9. Donkewicz, who has been charged with murder and other charges, is one of three people to have been arrested so far in connection with the Coatesville arsons. (See Arrests section below.)

The largest reported fire by early 2009 occurred January 24, 2009, when nearly an entire block of row houses on Fleetwood Street in Coatesville were burned down. The four-alarm fire was the fourteenth reported Coatesville area arson reported in 2009. Authorities said it was set in the back of one of the houses during the night and quickly spread to adjacent homes, destroying 15 houses in total and causing between $1.2 million and $2 million in damages. Fourteen families, constituting 32 adults and 18 children, were displaced by the fire, which took 150 firefighters three hours to bring under control. One firefighter broke his ankle while battling the flames. Among the homes destroyed was one belonging to Robin Scott, a Coatesville city councilwoman, who escaped unharmed along with her family.

On February 8, 2009, a fire was set in a mobile home in East Fallowfield Township, south of Coatesville. Authorities said the fire was deliberately set and shared "common traits" with the other Coatesville arsons. The mobile home was completely destroyed, but a married couple living there escaped unharmed.

On February 22, seven school buses were set on fire at the North Brandywine Middle School, north of Coatesville.

== Arrests ==
As of March 2009, six people have been arrested in connection with some of the arsons. Chester County District Attorney Joseph Carroll has said that arsonists arrested in connection with the Coatesville fires could face more than a life sentence, since the maximum penalty for a single arson conviction is 20 years; Carroll said, "I think life in prison is an appropriate punishment, given the extent of the property damage and terror to an entire city."

Ronald B. Tribbett Jr., 25, was arrested on August 22, 2008, in connection with four fires set that month in Sadsbury Township, Pennsylvania, which is just outside Coatesville. Tribbett, a 2002 graduate of the Coatesville Area School District, was a volunteer firefighter with the nearby Pomeroy Fire Company, and responded to some of the fires he allegedly set himself. Tribbett was unemployed at the time of his arrest, and has described himself as alcohol-dependent and learning-disabled. One of the fires allegedly set by Tribbett was the home of a 90-year-old man, who escaped uninjured. At the time of his arrest, Tribbett was on probation in Lancaster County for pleading guilty to criminal mischief in June 2006. He is currently awaiting trial on arson charges.

George Donkewicz, a 22-year-old Coatesville resident, was arrested on December 9 for setting two fires, including one that killed 83-year-old Irene Kempest on December 7. Donkewicz was arrested shortly after setting a fire on December 9 on Strode Avenue, the same street where Kempest had lived. The December 9 fire occurred at 4:19 a.m. under the back porch steps of an apartment building, but was quickly extinguished by responders before it caused any significant damage. Donkewicz was observed by police near the fire and arrested about an hour later; during police interviews, he admitted to starting both the December 7 and December 9 fires. The unemployed high school dropout also claimed to be suicidal and, according to police, said "he was hearing voices telling him to set fires and kill people." Donkewicz remains incarcerated and faces charges of criminal homicide, murder, aggravated assault, two counts each of arson and related charges, causing or risking catastrophe and criminal mischief; and four counts of recklessly endangering another person. Prosecutors said he faces pending charges in connection with "at least three other fires."

On December 15, police arrested two other suspects in connection to separate arsons. Leroy Robert McWilliams, 23, was arrested for setting a trash fire that spread to two homes on Franklin Street, which caused more than $110,000 in damage and forced the evacuation of the occupants, including a four-year-old boy. McWilliams is accused of setting five fires. In late November, McWilliams was collecting Social Security benefits, living in a tent and bathing in the Brandywine Creek, before an acquaintance agreed to rent him a room. McWilliams graduated from the Coatesville Area School District in 2002 but does not have a job.

While interviewing McWilliams on December 15, a 17-year-old male ran to Coatesville's West End Fire Company to report a garage fire on South Fifth Avenue. Hours later, the juvenile later admitted to setting the fire himself and was placed under arrest. Police and media outlets have not identified him because of his age. The teen's father said his son was "losing his way" and began running away from home frequently, but the father was unsuccessful in trying to get his son mental-health help. "He'd say, 'I know what I'm doing'". In February 2009, a Chester County judge order the juvenile to enroll at Abraxas Youth Family Services, a facility near Gettysburg, which includes a treatment center for juveniles who set fires.

On February 18, police arrested 19-year-old Roger Leon Barlow Jr. for arson and related charges for nine suspected arsons between January 2 and February 3. Barlow is also considered a suspect in the January 24 fire that destroyed 15 row houses. Barlow, who lives in Downingtown, a Pennsylvania borough not far from Coatesville, was imprisoned in lieu of $9 million bail. Officials described Barlow as a "classic pyromaniac"; authorities also told news outlets Barlow may have been "distraught" due to recent personal issues, possibly a death in the family. Barlow's family members have told media outlets he would not have started the fires unless egged on by someone else. Barlow, a student at Universal Technical Institute, an automotive school in Exton, had been enrolled for a year and a half at the Center for Arts and Technology, a technical high school outside Phoenixville, Pennsylvania.

Mark Gilliam, 20, of West Chester, Pennsylvania was arrested on February 19 on a federal charge for trying to burn down the Happy Days Family Bistro on January 25, 2009. Gilliam had previously applied to work as a firefighter for the West Bradford Fire Company, but was rejected. According to authorities, Gilliam lingered after starting the Family Bistro fire and offered to help with the clean-up. Barlow met Gilliam at the Universal Technical Institute in 2007 or 2009; Barlow first told police he and Gilliam "were responsible for numerous additional Coatesville fires", but later recanted that statement. Police found newspaper articles, firefighting equipment and incendiary materials at Gilliam's home during an investigation.

== Motive ==
Officials have said the fires do not appear to follow a clear pattern. Coatesville Police Chief William Matthews has said more than one person appears to be involved in the arsons, based on the large number of fires and the fact that many had occurred within minutes of one another. Some of the fires are believed to have been copycats, especially since the arsons continued after three people were arrested in December; Coatesville city manager Harry Walker said of the arsons, "The more we caught them, the more fires were set." Police have also said they believe the fires may be part of a gang initiation, but have declined to provide media outlets more information about the theory. Chester County District Attorney Joseph Carroll has suggested the arsonists may have a gripe against the local government because they are striking almost entirely within the city limits, despite the intense investigation that has continued to take place there.

== Investigation and response ==
A state of emergency was declared in Coatesville following the arson on January 24, 2009. The declaration gave the city powers to board up buildings, assign police officers to protect structures, provide help to affected families and remove items they deem dangerous from properties and to immediately purchase safety equipment without budgetary concerns. In addition to increasing city police patrols, a Chester County Arson Task Force consisting of local, county, state and federal law enforcement agencies was created to investigate the arsons. The Bureau of Alcohol, Tobacco, Firearms and Explosives joined the investigation, and Governor Ed Rendell dispatched Frank Pawlowski, commissioner of the Pennsylvania State Police, to Coatesville specifically to assist with the arson investigations. Expert profilers of serial criminals are also involved in the case.

Since most of the fires appeared to have been started using material such as trash, debris or furniture, police and city officials started ordering people to remove any such items from their porches. Officials also asked them to keep porch lights on at night or install motion detector lights on their property, and suggested residents purchase guard dogs. In late January, the city distributed 800 motion-activated lights and smoke detectors and batteries to residents. In January, a $5,000 reward was offered to anyone who provided information that would result in a conviction; the next month, the reward was increased to $20,000. A local credit union set up a $5,000 relief fund to help people displaced by the fires. On February 8, a curfew was imposed forbidding anyone younger than 18 from staying out past 8 p.m.; a previous curfew had been set for 10 p.m.

Hundreds of residents attended city hall meetings to voice their fear of the arsons and frustration with the city for their apparent lack of progress in stopping them. Coatesville residents began packing their suitcases and keeping them by their front doors so they can leave town at a moment's notice; at least one resident had her children sleep fully dressed in the same room, in case she had to gather them up in the middle of the night. One resident told the city council, "Every night, you wonder if tonight's the night your porch is going to be set on fire." Another warned of the possibility of residents seeking vigilante justice: "We all just want them caught, and I'll tell you, the men of this town feel that because the city doesn't appear to be helping, they want to take matters into their own hands. They say, 'If someone is on my front porch, God help them.'" Coatesville fire chief Kevin Johnson described the arsons as "a form of terrorism" and The New York Times said of Coatesville during the time: "With its desolate streets and boarded-up row houses, the city feels like a place whose will has slipped away. ... The burned-out homes look as if they were bombed. Roofs are collapsed. Piles of charred insulation are piled curbside. Clothing, toys and photographs sit soggy and strewn across the front yards."

On February 9, 2009, U.S. Senator Bob Casey visited Coatesville and spoke with local residents, victims, and law enforcement officials. Casey promised to help the citizens of Coatesville to find long-term solutions to the problem and said he spoke with Attorney General Eric Holder about obtaining additional resources and Federal Emergency Management Agency funding for the city.
