= Caln Meeting House =

Historic church in Pennsylvania, United States

- U.S. National Register of Historic Places
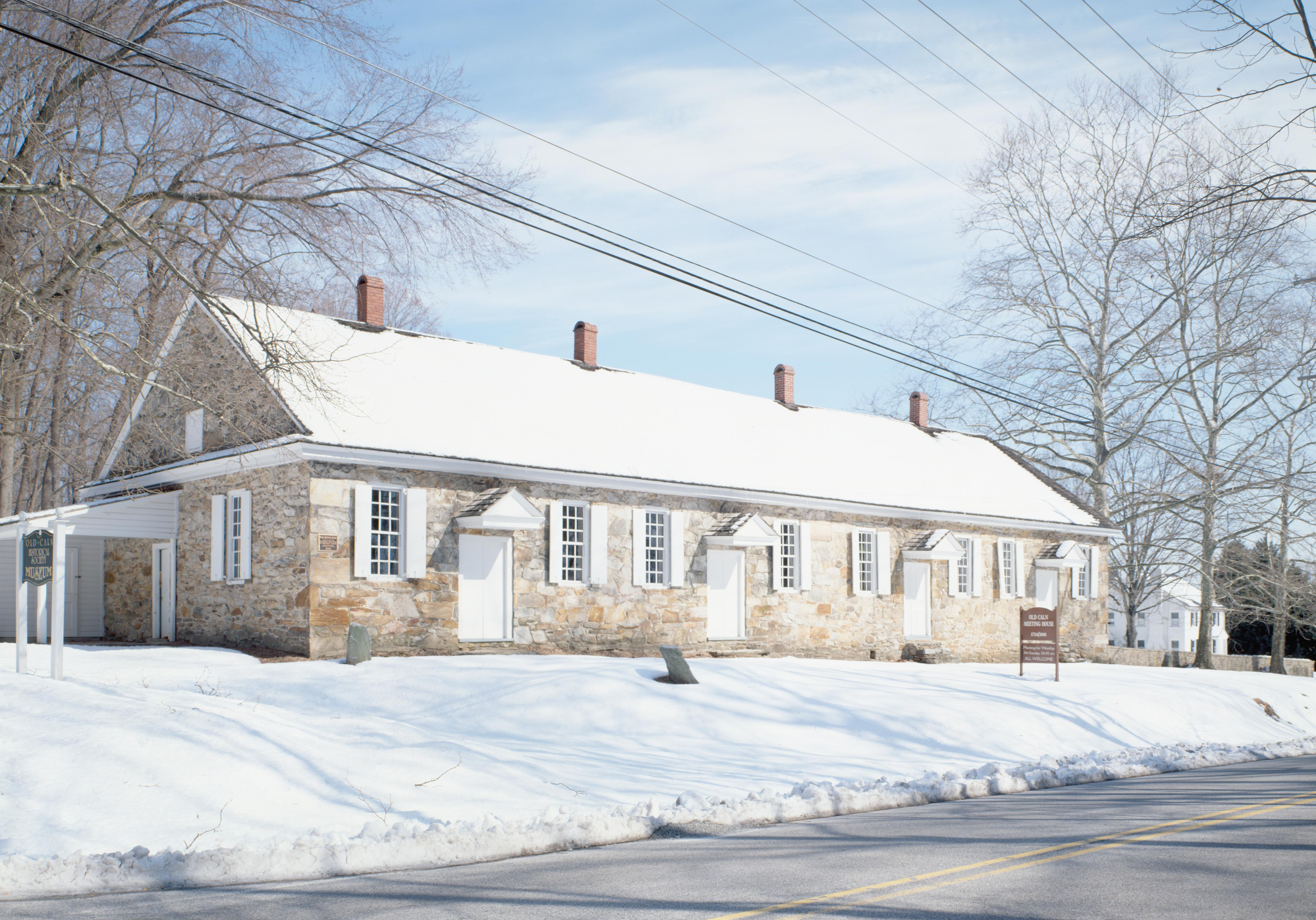
- Caln Meeting House, HABS Photo

- Location within Pennsylvania Location within the United States
- Location: 901 Caln Meeting House Rd., near Coatesville, Caln Township, Pennsylvania
- Coordinates: 40°0′26″N 75°45′55″W
- Area: 4 acres (1.6 ha)
- Built: 1726
- NRHP reference No.: 84003182
- Added to NRHP: May 03, 1984

Caln Meeting House is a historic Quaker meeting house located at 901 Caln Meeting House Road, near Coatesville in Caln Township, Chester County, Pennsylvania. It was built in 1726, and is a one-story, tan fieldstone structure. It was enlarged to its present size in 1801.

It was added to the National Register of Historic Places in 1984. The meeting house is open occasionally for museum events. A graveyard is also held on the northern end of the building, with another sitting on the other side of PA 340.

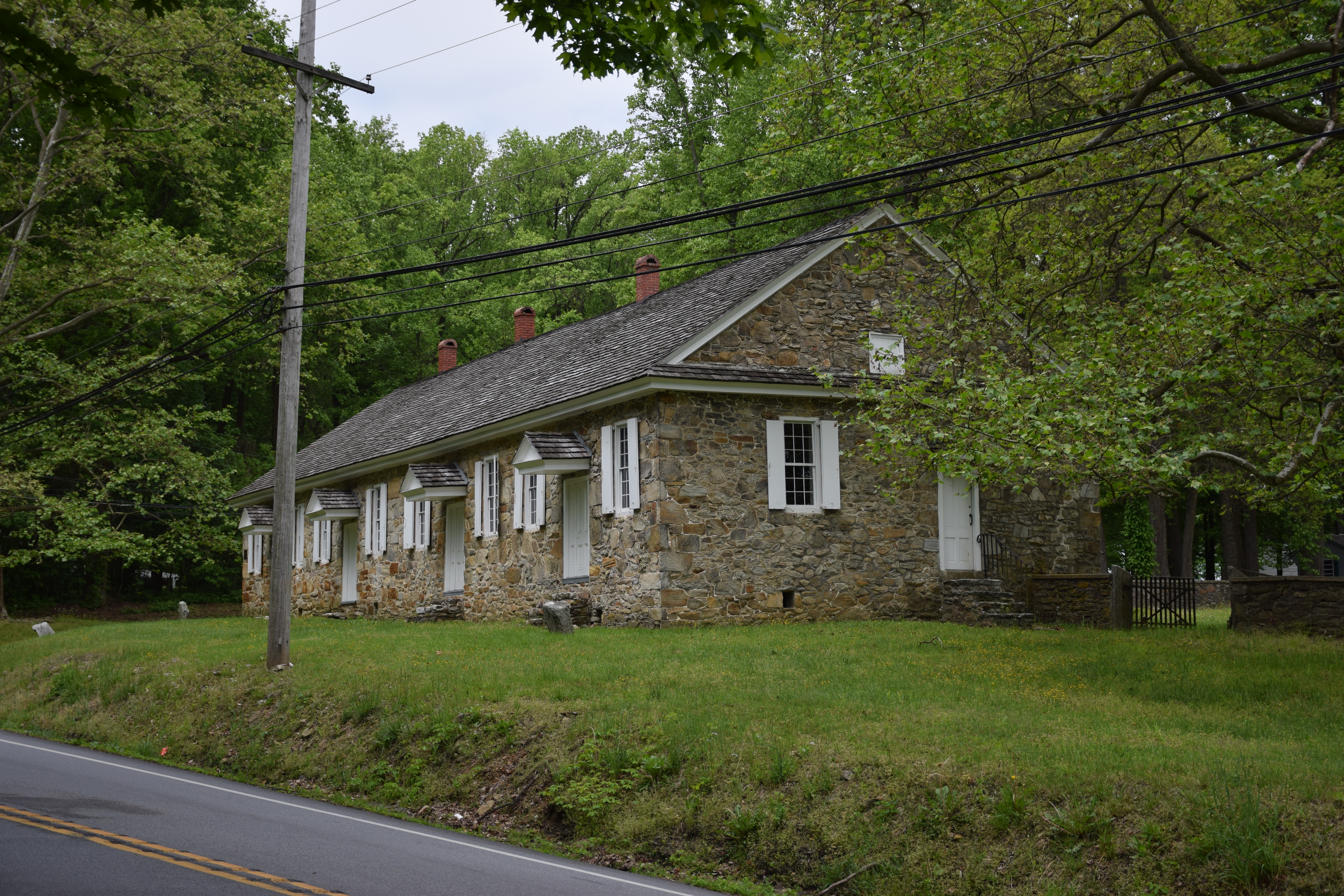
Meeting House in 2020.

One third of the Caln Meeting House is used by the Old Caln Historical Society as a local history museum and to house archives, artifacts and other historical memorabilia.
