= Edmond W. Davis =

American historian (born 1976)

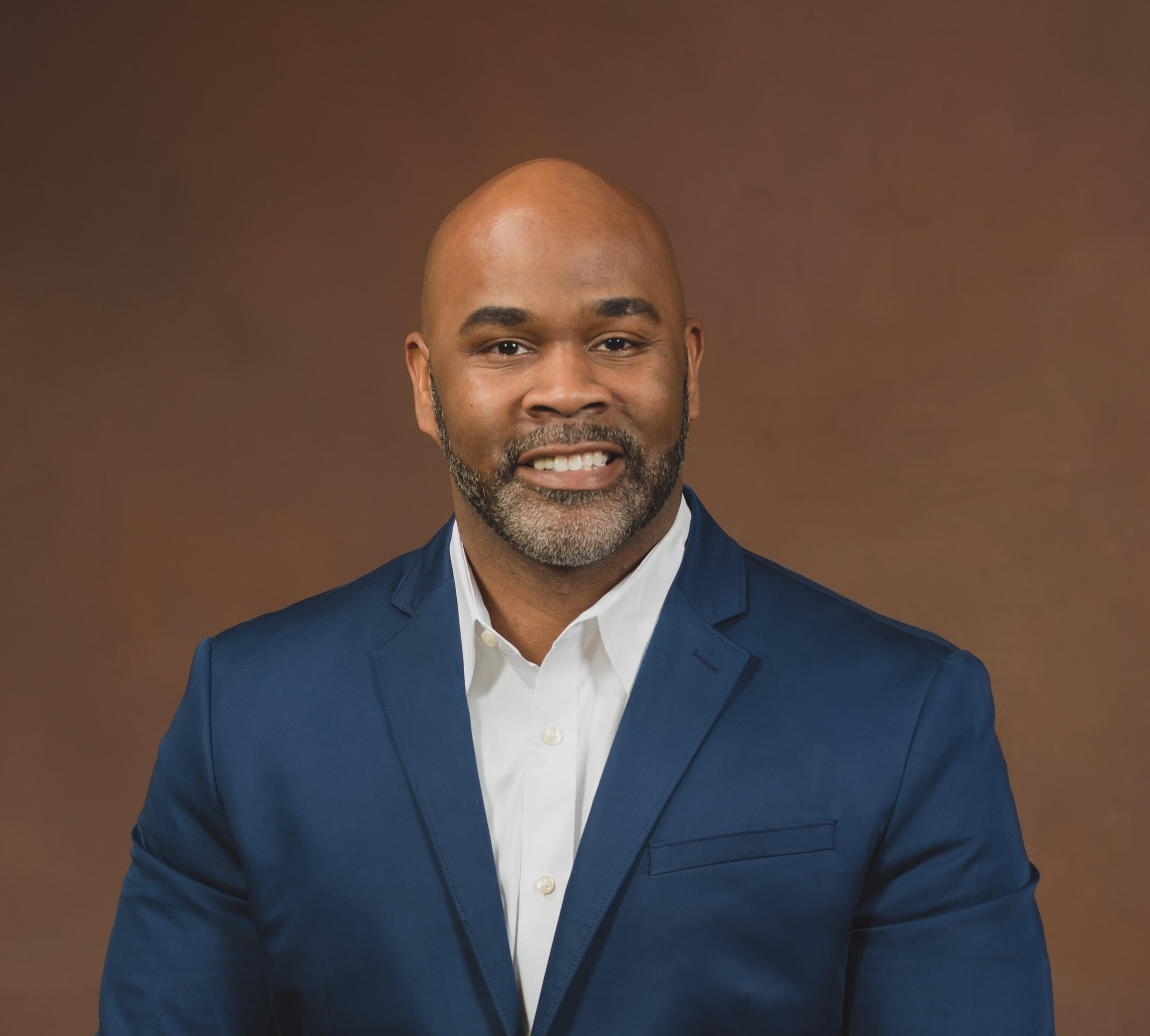
Edmond W. Davis

Edmond W. Davis (born 1976) is an American historian, author and educator. From 2020 to 2022, he was the director of the Derek Olivier Research Institute (DORI) at Arkansas Baptist College.

Previously, he served as professor of history at University of Phoenix and Pulaski Technical College. He authored Pioneering African-American Aviators in 2012 featuring the first and only Arkansas Tuskegee Airmen history textbook.

He is a member of the Arkansas Historical Association.

== Biography ==
He was born and raised in West Philadelphia, Pennsylvania, Davis faced adversity from a young age, experiencing homelessness during his formative years. After overcoming homelessness, he re-enrolled into school and graduating from Coatesville Area Senior High School in 1996. He attended Grambling State University, where he graduated early, and earned a master's degree in history from Louisiana Technical University.

== Career ==
Davis's has served as an assistant professor of history at several colleges and universities, with a current position at Arkansas Baptist College as adjunct professor. His research in sociohistorical topics include Women's History, African American History, Military History, Civil Rights History, and World War II History.

As an author his works include Arkansas' Tuskegee Airmen history textbook. Additionally, he and his wife Monica Davis have been awarded with the title of Amazon #1 New Release Authors for their eBook titled GROWTH MINDSET: Developing a Growth Mindset to Respond-Responsibly in 2022.

He was the director of the Derek Olivier Research Institute (DORI) from 2020 to 2022, where he focuses on the prevention of violence and community outreach initiatives.

In 2022–2023, Davis was the Director of Career Services Arkansas Baptist College and orchestrated the first Historically Black College & University (HBCU) Black Wall Street Career Fest.
