= Thorndale, Pennsylvania =

Unincorporated community in Pennsylvania, US

Thorndale
- Census-designated place
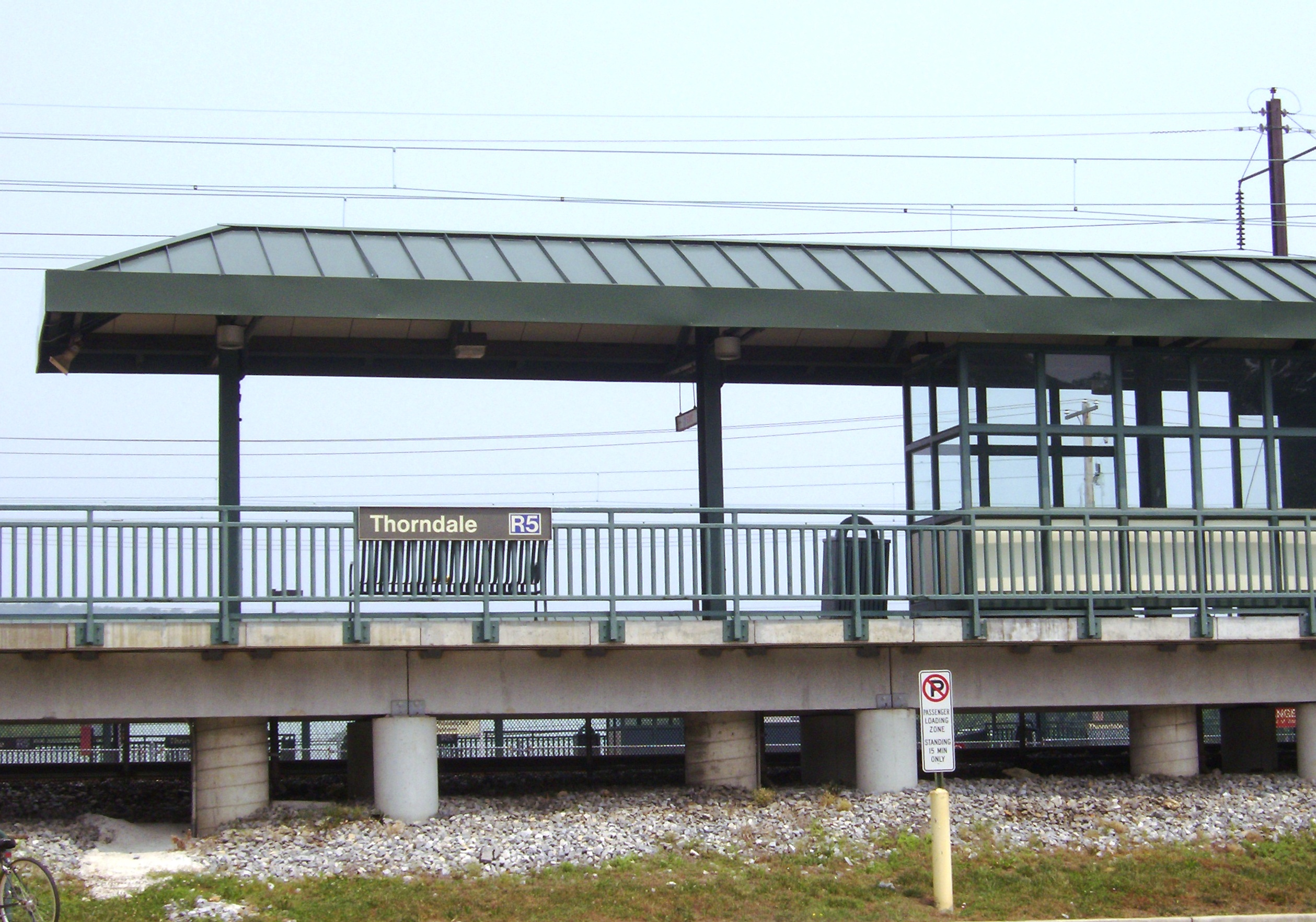
- Thorndale SEPTA Station

- Location in Chester County and the U.S. state of Pennsylvania.
- Coordinates: 39°59′47″N 75°45′06″W
- Country: United States
- State: Pennsylvania
- County: Chester
- Township: Caln

Area
  - Total: 1.8 sq mi (4.7 km^{2})
  - Land: 1.8 sq mi (4.7 km^{2})
  - Water: 0.0 sq mi (0 km^{2})
- Elevation: 344 ft (105 m)

Population (2010)
  - Total: 3,407
  - Density: 1,900/sq mi (730/km^{2})
- Time zone: UTC-5 (EST)
  - Summer (DST): UTC-4 (EDT)
- ZIP code: 19372
- Area codes: 610 and 484

Thorndale is a census-designated place in Caln Township, Chester County, Pennsylvania, United States. The population was 3,407 at the 2010 census.

Thorndale is the commercial and administrative center of Caln Township. The community's main street is U.S. Route 30 Business. Many of Thorndale's old houses fell into disrepair from the late 1990s to present and have been torn down and replaced with new businesses.

Thorndale is historically notable for containing a summer house of U.S. President James Buchanan, which still stands and has been incorporated into a golf course and turned into a restaurant. The community contains the Thorndale Fire Station and Caln Elementary School, part of the Coatesville Area School District. Thorndale sits along SEPTA's Paoli/Thorndale Line and is currently the last station stop on that line. It is also served by the SEPTA Route 135 bus.

== Geography ==
Thorndale is located at 39°59′47″N 75°45′6″W (39.996456, -75.751606).

According to the U.S. Census Bureau, Thorndale has a total area of 1.8 square miles (4.7 km^{2}), of which 0.55% is water. It is part of Caln Township, with students attending school in either the Coatesville Area School District or the Downingtown Area School District.

== Demographics ==
=== 2020 census ===
As of the 2020 census, Thorndale had a population of 3,669. The median age was 39.5 years. 18.2% of residents were under the age of 18 and 16.1% of residents were 65 years of age or older. For every 100 females there were 99.7 males, and for every 100 females age 18 and over there were 98.7 males age 18 and over.

100.0% of residents lived in urban areas, while 0.0% lived in rural areas.

There were 1,496 households in Thorndale, of which 25.7% had children under the age of 18 living in them. Of all households, 51.5% were married-couple households, 17.5% were households with a male householder and no spouse or partner present, and 22.2% were households with a female householder and no spouse or partner present. About 25.3% of all households were made up of individuals and 8.8% had someone living alone who was 65 years of age or older.

There were 1,598 housing units, of which 6.4% were vacant. The homeowner vacancy rate was 1.7% and the rental vacancy rate was 8.3%.

Racial composition as of the 2020 census
Race	Number	Percent
White	2,722	74.2%
Black or African American	406	11.1%
American Indian and Alaska Native	16	0.4%
Asian	129	3.5%
Native Hawaiian and Other Pacific Islander	0	0.0%
Some other race	121	3.3%
Two or more races	275	7.5%
Hispanic or Latino (of any race)	321	8.7%

=== 2000 census ===
As of the 2000 census, there were 3,561 people, 1,347 households, and 952 families residing in the CDP. The population density was 1,953.2 inhabitants per square mile (754.1/km^{2}). There were 1,418 housing units at an average density of 777.8 per square mile (300.3/km^{2}). The racial makeup of the CDP was 82.65% White, 10.98% African American, 0.22% Native American, 2.33% Asian, 0.11% Pacific Islander, 2.13% from other races, and 1.57% from two or more races. Hispanic or Latino of any race were 4.32% of the population.

There were 1,347 households, out of which 36.8% had children under the age of 18 living with them, 57.2% were married couples living together, 9.3% had a female householder with no husband present, and 29.3% were non-families. 22.3% of all households were made up of individuals, and 5.4% had someone living alone who was 65 years of age or older. The average household size was 2.63 and the average family size was 3.12.

The population in Thorndale was spread out, with 26.1% under the age of 18, 7.9% from 18 to 24, 36.1% from 25 to 44, 21.1% from 45 to 64, and 8.7% who were 65 years of age or older. The median age was 35 years. For every 100 females, there were 94.8 males. For every 100 females age 18 and over, there were 95.2 males.

The median income for a household in the CDP was $61,830, and the median income for a family was $70,781. Males had a median income of $45,573 versus $35,096 for females. The per capita income for the CDP was $25,376. About 4.4% of families and 6.4% of the population were below the poverty line, including 9.9% of those under age 18 and 14.5% of those age 65 or over.

== Education ==
The school district is Coatesville Area School District.
