= Whittier C. Atkinson =

American physician (1893–1991)

Whittier Cinclair Atkinson
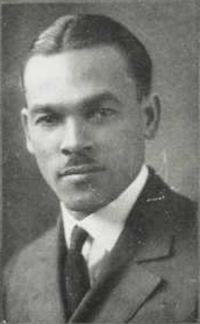
- Atkinson in 1925
- Born: April 23, 1893; Waverly, Georgia, US
- Died: January 2, 1991 (aged 97); Jekyll Island, Georgia
- Education: Howard University (BS, MD)
- Occupation: Physician
- Known for: Founded the Clement Atkinson Memorial Hospital in 1936

Whittier Cinclair Atkinson (April 23, 1893 – January 2, 1991) was an American general practitioner who founded the Clement Atkinson Memorial Hospital in Coatesville, Pennsylvania. Founded in 1936 and closed in 1978, the hospital was established to meet the medical needs of African American community members who faced racial discrimination at other area hospitals.

A graduate of Howard University College of Medicine, Atkinson became the first Black physician in Chester County in 1927. He served as president of two African American medical associations and received several awards and honors, including Howard University's Alumnus of the Year in 1953 and the Pennsylvania Medical Society's General Practitioner of the Year in 1960.

The Clement Atkinson Memorial Hospital was listed on the National Register of Historic Places in 2011. The Pennsylvania Historical and Museum Commission erected a historical marker outside the building in Whittier Atkinson's honor in 2007.
