= Clement Atkinson Memorial Hospital =

Historic building in Pennsylvania, U.S.

- U.S. National Register of Historic Places
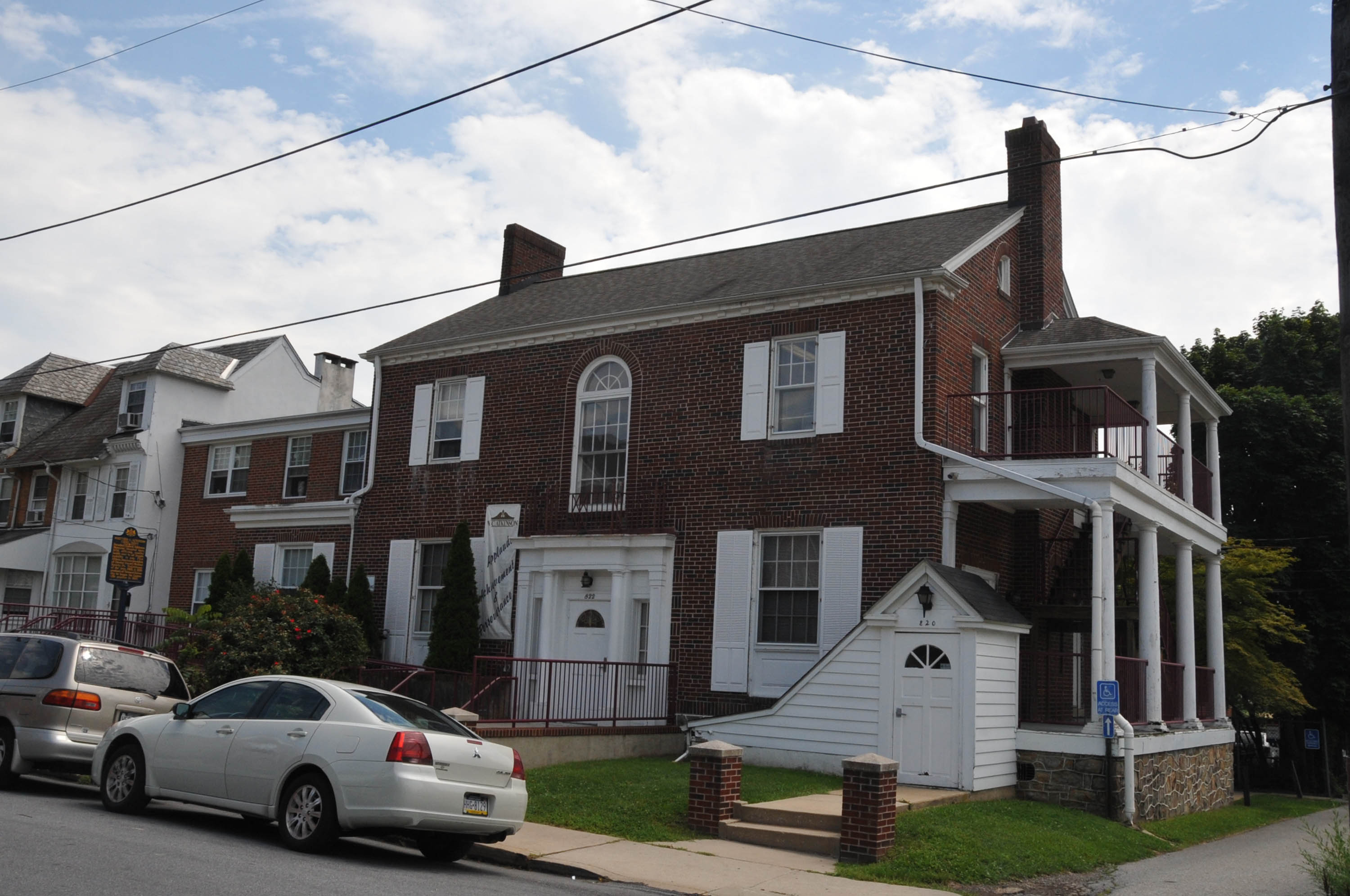

- Location within Pennsylvania Location within the United States
- Location: 822–824 East Chestnut Street, Coatesville, Pennsylvania
- Coordinates: 40°0′26″N 75°45′55″W
- Area: Less than one acre
- Built: 1932, 1937, 1955, 1962 1969
- Architectural style: Colonial Revival
- NRHP reference No.: 11000642
- Added to NRHP: September 8, 2011

Clement Atkinson Memorial Hospital is a historic hospital building located at Coatesville, Chester County, Pennsylvania, United States.

The hospital was founded in 1936 by Whittier C. Atkinson, the first African American physician in Chester County, who named the hospital after his father. It served the local African American population and remained in operation until 1978.

The building contains five sections. The original section was the home of Dr. Atkinson. This section is a 2 1/2-story, three-bay red brick rowhouse dwelling in the Colonial Revival style. It had a one-story, eight-room, hospital wing at the rear of the dwelling, were built in 1932. A second story was added to the hospital wing in 1937. Later additions took place in 1955, 1962, and 1969. The hospital was converted to a community center and low-income apartments in 1991.

It was added to the National Register of Historic Places in 2011.
