= National Bank of Coatesville Building =

- U.S. National Register of Historic Places
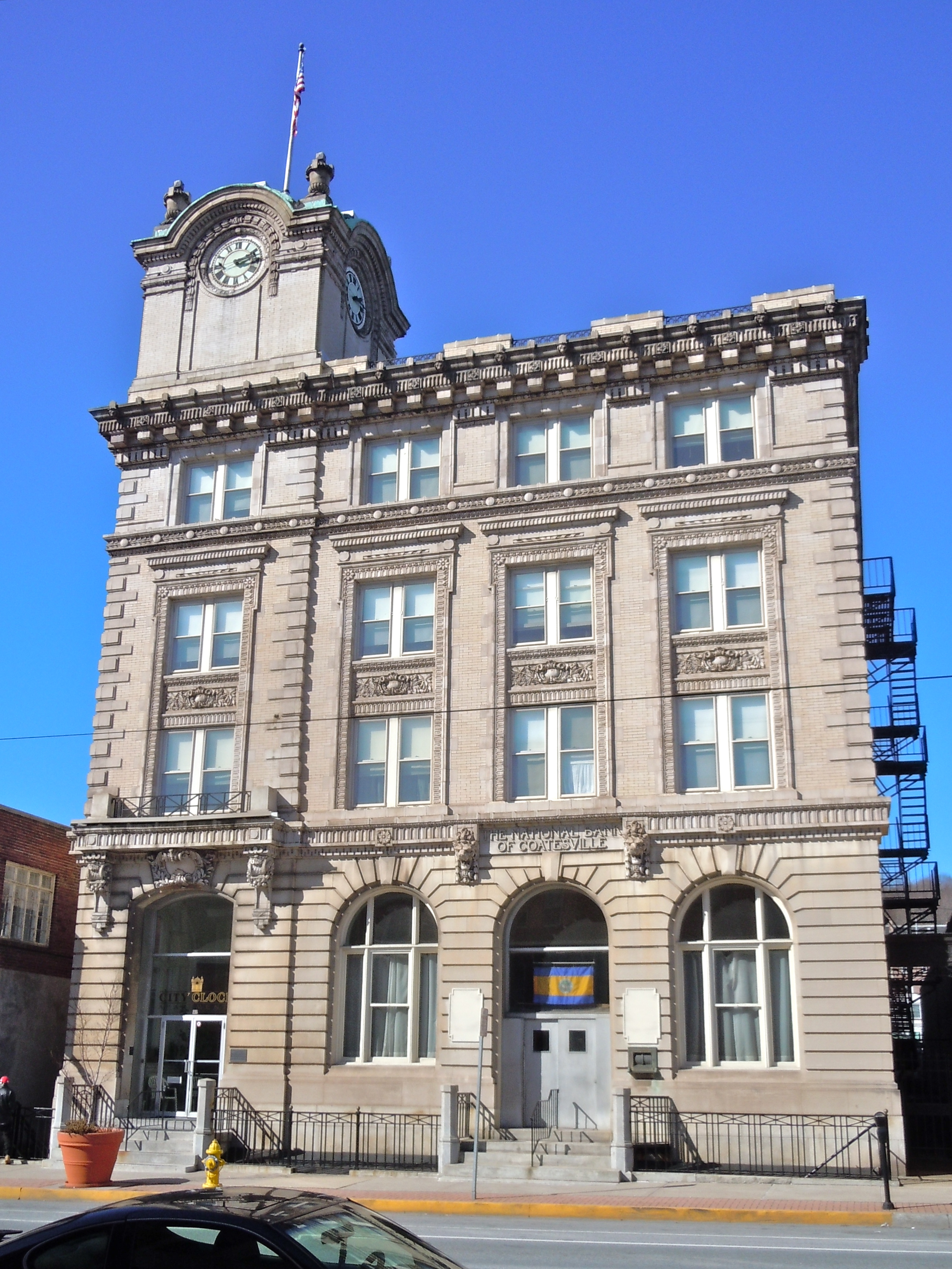
- National Bank of Coatesville Building, March 2011

- Location within Pennsylvania Location within the United States
- Location: 235 E. Lincoln Highway, Coatesville, Pennsylvania
- Coordinates: 39°59′1″N 75°49′19″W
- Area: 3 acres (1.2 ha)
- Built: 1906–1908
- Architect: Watson & Huckel
- Architectural style: Late Victorian, Eclectic
- NRHP reference No.: 77001150
- Added to NRHP: September 14, 1977

The National Bank of Coatesville Building, also known as the Industrial Valley Bank Building, is an historic bank building that is located in Coatesville, Chester County, Pennsylvania, United States. It was added to the National Register of Historic Places in 1977.

== History and architectural features ==
Built between 1906 and 1908, this historic building is a four-story, steel-frame structure that was faced in buff-colored brick and Indiana limestone, Designed in an eclectic, Late Victorian style, it measures 70 feet by 140 feet, was trimmed in Indiana limestone and terra cotta, and features a clock tower with rounded dome framing. In addition to the bank, the building once housed the post office. The building has been converted to apartments.
