= Coatesville Area School District =

School district in Chester County, Pennsylvania, USA

Address
- 3030 C.G. Zinn Road Thorndale, Chester County, Pennsylvania, 19372; United States

District information
- Type: Public
- Motto: "Rich in Diversity, Committed to Excellence"
- Grades: K–12th
- Superintendent: Anthony Rybarczyk, Ed.D.
- Schools: 9 (including Coatesville Cyber Academy)

Students and staff
- Students: 5,300
- Staff: 510
- Colors: Red, black, and white

Other information
- Website: casdschools.org

The Coatesville Area School District (CASD) covers the City of Coatesville; the Boroughs of Modena and South Coatesville; and Caln Township, East Fallowfield Township, Sadsbury Township, Valley Township, West Brandywine Township and West Caln Township in Chester County, Pennsylvania. According to census data recorded between 2010 and 2019, Coatesville Area School District served a resident population of approximately 64,700. The district operates four elementary schools, two middle schools, two high schools (an intermediate high school and a senior high school), and a cyber academy.

Coatesville Area School District serves the only city in Chester County (the wealthiest county in Pennsylvania) as well as the city's surrounding boroughs and townships. The district has long been the center of the Coatesville community and prides itself on being rich in diversity. Not only does Coatesville serve the most diverse school district in Chester County, but it also ranks the 3rd most diverse in Pennsylvania and 56th in the United States.

== History ==
The first school established and recorded in Coatesville was the Moses Coates School in 1789 which was run by Sallie Coats until 1814 when Joseph Ridgeway donated the land and building off the corner of 3rd & Harmony (now Dr. Martin Luther King Jr. Blvd.) to the newly established "Trustees of Coatesville School Association". They named the school The Valley School but was also known as the Little Red School House.

In August 2013, district superintendent Richard Como and athletics director Jim Donato left their jobs following the discovery of racist text messages on their district-provided mobile phones. Both were arrested in 2014 on charges of theft and state ethics violations. Donato pleaded guilty in June 2016 with an agreement to pay restitution to the district for the $15,000 he admitted stealing. March 18, 2018, Chester County Common Pleas Judge Thomas G. Gavin sentenced Richard Wallace Como to a jail term in Chester County Prison of three to 23 months, followed by three years of probation, on the charges that he was found guilty of at trial in January – dealing in unlawful proceeds, theft by unlawful taking, theft by failure to make required disposition of funds and conflict of interest.

Angelo Romaniello Jr. was appointed acting superintendent following Como's departure, following which Taschner was voted in by the board in a 7–2 vote for a five-year contract running July 1, 2017, through June 30, 2022. Taschner resigned in August 2019.

== Schools ==
Primary Schools

- Doe Run Elementary School (K–5th) in East Fallowfield Township
- King's Highway Elementary School (K–5th) in West Caln Township
- Rainbow Elementary School (K–5th) in Valley Township
- Reeceville Elementary School (K–5th) in West Brandywine Township

Secondary Schools

- North Brandywine Middle School (6th–8th) in West Brandywine Township
- Scott Middle School (6th–8th) in Coatesville City
- Coatesville Area Intermediate High School (9th–10th) in Caln Township
- Coatesville Area Senior High School (11th–12th) in Caln Township

Cyber School

- Coatesville Cyber Academy (K–12th)

Former Schools

- Friendship Elementary School in West Brandywine Township (closed 2018 and demolished)
- South Brandywine Middle School in East Fallowfield Township (closed 2018 and demolished)
- Caln Elementary School in Caln Township (closed 2026)
- East Fallowfield Elementary School in East Fallowfield Township (closed 2026)

On September 16, 2026, Coatesville Area School District broke ground on the new North Brandywine Middle School. The new middle school will be built on the former site of Friendship Elementary School. It is slated to open for the 2028–2029 school year.

== Athletics ==
Coatesville Area School District is ranked 2nd in best school districts for athletes in Chester County and 13th for athletes in Pennsylvania. Coatesville Area Senior High School joined the Pennsylvania Interscholastic Athletic Association (PIAA) in 1922. In 1950, the Ches-Mont League was formed. This league originally comprised eight schools in Chester County. Coatesville (National Division) is the only original member still part of the league today.

=== PIAA Championships ===
- 1936 Swim Team won the District One Swim Title
- The 1937 Swim Team won the District One Swim Title
- 1941 The Boys' Basketball Team won the Championships
- 1941 Girls' Tennis Team won District Champions.
- 1941 Boys' Tennis Team won Section II Champions
- 1943 Swim Team won the District One Swim Title
- 1994 Girls' Basketball
- 2001 Boys' Basketball

=== Ches-Mont Championships ===
- 1950 Track and field won the Ches-Mont League Championships
- 1950 Cross country (boys) Ches-Mont Championship

== Board of School Directors ==
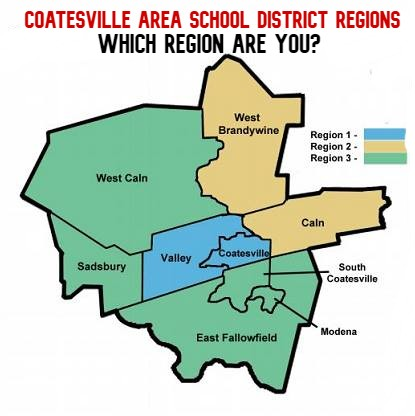
Coatesville Area School District Regions

The nine members of the board are elected at-large and serve 4-year terms. They are elected by voters in Region I (Coatesville City & Valley Township), Region II (Caln & West Brandywine Townships), and Region III (Modena & South Coatesville Boroughs, and East Fallowfield, Sadsbury, & West Caln Townships).

- Lyryn Yacoe, President (Region III)
- Steven Wilson, Vice President (Region I)
- Holly Charest (Region I)
- Vacancy (Region I)
- Elizabeth Brindle (Region II)
- Shawna Maxwell (Region II)
- Liz Muirhead (Region II)
- Robert M. Knecht (Region III)
- Robin Seagreaves (Region III)
