= Coatesville Area High School =

Public school in Caln Township, Pennsylvania, United States

Coordinates: 39.991°N 75.797°W

Location
- 1445 East Lincoln Highway; Coatesville, Chester County, Pennsylvania 19320; United States

Information
- Type: Public
- Established: 1869
- School district: Coatesville Area School District
- Principal: Brian M. Chenger
- Grades: 9th–12th
- Campuses: Coatesville Area Intermediate High School; Coatesville Area Senior High School
- Colors: Red, black, and white
- Athletics: PIAA District 1, Ches-Mont League (National Division)
- Nickname: Red Raiders
- Yearbook: Talaria
- Website: CAIHS: casdschools.org/o/caihs CASHS: casdschools.org/o/cashs

The Coatesville Area High School, colloquially known as "CASH" or “The Ville," is a public high school in Caln Township, Chester County, Pennsylvania. It is part of the Coatesville Area School District and has a Coatesville postal address.

The high school is divided into two schools:

- Coatesville Area Intermediate High School (CAIHS, but called the 9/10 Center or simply 9/10) for 9th and 10th graders
- Coatesville Area Senior High School (CASHS) for 11th and 12th graders

Student demographics are reported as follows: White, 40%; African American, 27%; Hispanic, 26%; Multiracial, 7%; and Asian, 1%

== History ==
The Coatesville High School was founded in the center of the City of Coatesville in what is now the site of the Benner Education Center. In 1940, the high school was relocated to what is now the Scott Middle School. In 1968, the high school was relocated to the current campus just east of the City of Coatesville, into the current CASH building. The high school campus contains a large amount of land, much of it forested hillside, abutting the nearby Veteran's Hospital. The old stone house that had belonged to the previous owners became part of the district administration and remained on the campus. Several CCIU facilities are located on the high school campus, including the Center for Arts and Technology (CAT), a vocational school for county high schoolers.

During the early 1990s, the high school expanded and the CAIHS building was constructed on the site of the former swamp land, and became home to the 9th and 10th grades. CASH remained the home for the 11th and 12th grades, and a new football stadium was constructed on what had been open grass land The original football stadium (Scott Field) is located in the center of Coatesville and is used currently used by other organizations. The CAIHS building (or 9/10 Center) was not designed for the site, but instead used a predesigned building. An artificial hill had to be constructed to accommodate this building layout, and this caused major settlement issues following the building's construction. Most of these problems were resolved by ground and foundation repairs in the early years of the building, however the building continues to be monitored, and several crack gauges can be found all over the building's walls. Until the building was renamed the 9/10 Center in 2002, it was typically referred to by the nickname "Chaos," a mispronunciation of the building's actual name, CAIHS, and a reference to the highly rowdy nature of the building, which was often overcrowded. The connotations associated with a high school containing two buildings bearing the common names of Chaos and CASH were a large motivator for the renaming of the buildings into the 9/10 Center and 11/12 Center (also referred to as the 11/12 Building).

Although certain grades are assigned to each of the two buildings, class scheduling, facility location, and necessity creates some student flow between the buildings during class changes.

== Notable alumni ==
- Joseph Gennaro and Rodney Linderman, members of The Dead Milkmen
- Richard Hamilton, former professional basketball player and NBA Champion in 2004
- Terrance Laird, track and field athlete
- Derrick Morgan, former professional football player
