= Lynching of Zachariah Walker =

African American who was lynched in the U.S. state of Pennsylvania in 1911

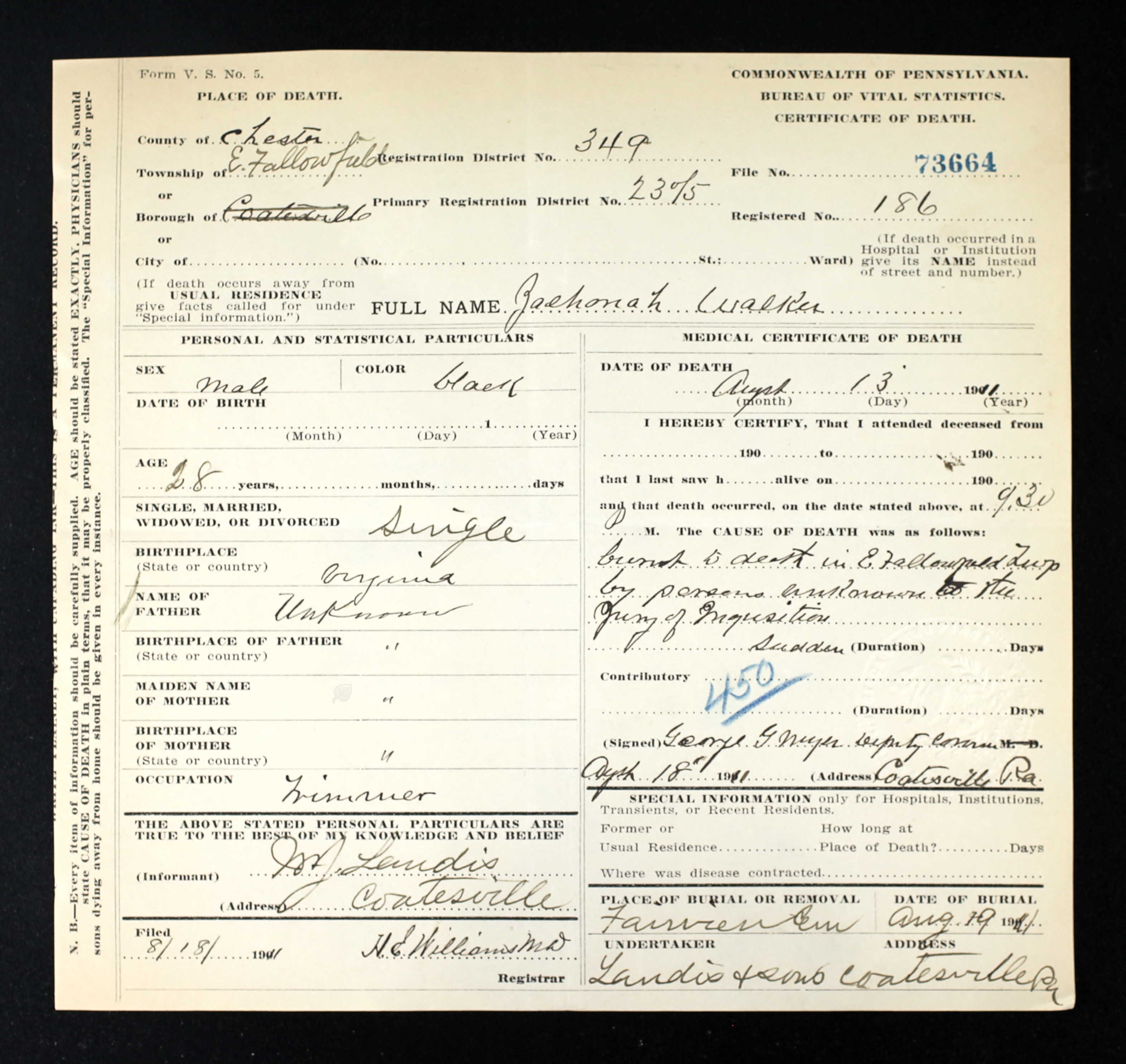
- Zachariah Walker death certificate
- Date: August 13, 1911
- Location: Coatesville, Pennsylvania
- Motive: Racism, vigilantism
- Participants: White mob
- Deaths: 1

The lynching of Zachariah Walker occurred on August 13, 1911, in Coatesville, Pennsylvania. A white mob attacked and burned African American steelworker Zachariah Walker alive in retaliation for reportedly killing Edgar Rice, a white Worth Brothers Steel company police officer.

== Coatesville demographics ==
Between 1900 and 1910, the town of Coatesville became home to increasing numbers of African Americans and foreign-born whites. The European immigrants who settled in Coatesville were unable to live in residential areas inhabited by US-born whites, and begrudgingly resorted to living near the town's African American populations. This institutionalized ethnic hierarchy turned the town into a highly suspicious and segregated community.

== Death of Edgar Rice and Zachariah Walker's arrest ==
On August 12, 1911, Zachariah Walker, an African American resident of Coatesville, fired his handgun near a small group of immigrant workers, with the intention to scare them. Walker was under the influence of alcohol at the time. Edgar Rice, a Worth Brothers Steel police officer, confronted Walker and threatened to club him. Walker responded by saying he would retaliate and kill him. Both Walker and Rice drew guns; Walker was first to the trigger and shot Rice twice. The officer died quickly afterwards.

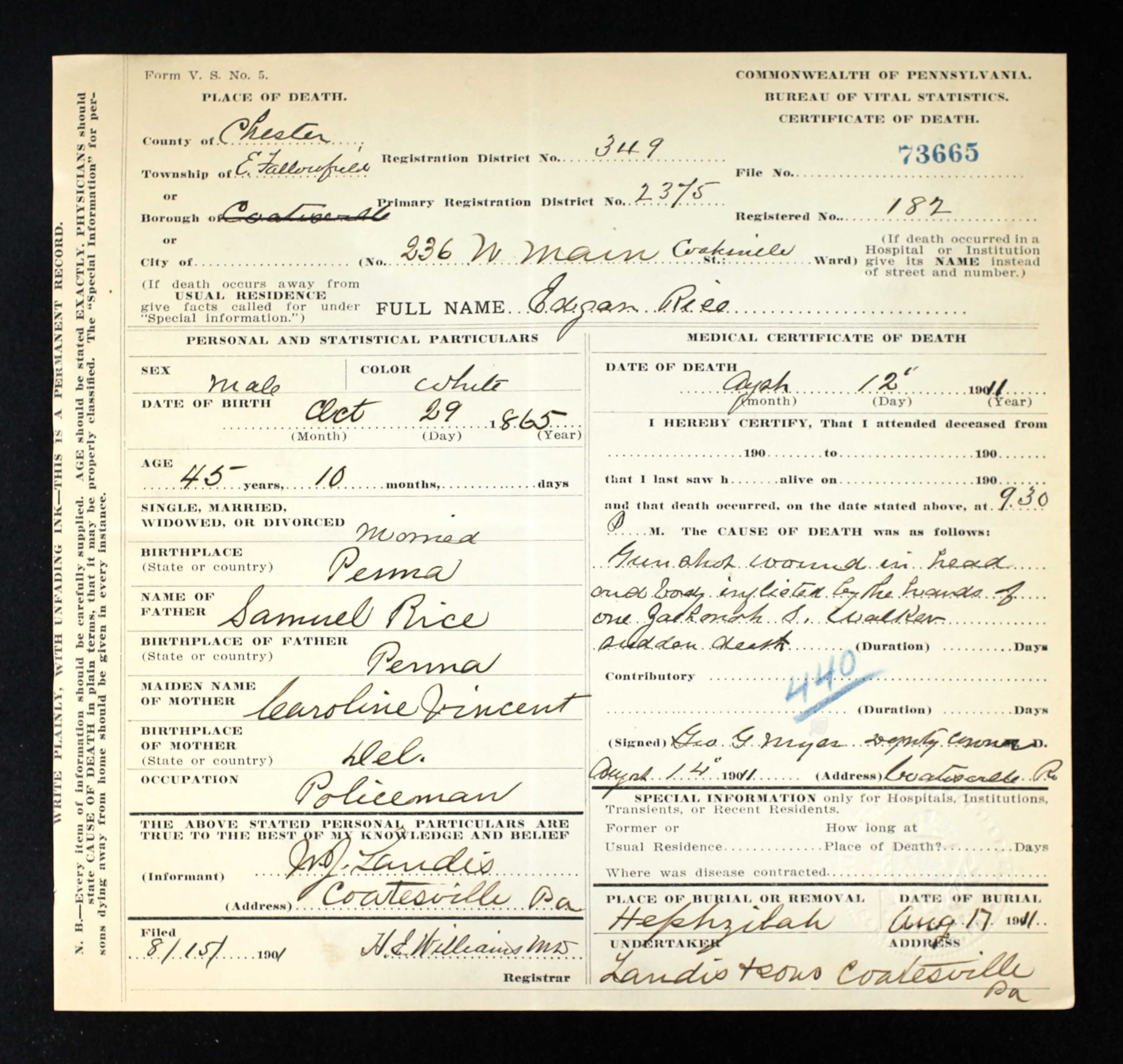
Death certificate of Edgar Rice, Pennsylvania 1911

After witnesses reported Rice's murder, locals searched the nearby area for Walker. A young farm boy discovered him hiding in a barn, and informed two search-party members. Walker scared the men away with his gun before they could apprehend him.

The next day, a group of firefighters spotted Walker concealed in a tree. As the firefighters tried to apprehend Walker, he attempted suicide by shooting himself in the head. Walker ended up in custody, where a district attorney and two police officers claimed that he confessed to the crime, saying, "I killed him easy."

== Walker's lynching ==
On August 13, 1911, an angry mob of about two thousand Coatesville residents camped outside the Coatesville Hospital, where Walker was recovering. Soon after they surrounded the hospital, the mob easily pushed aside Walker's police guard, and proceeded to drag Walker out of the hospital while he was still chained to his bed. The mob killed Walker by throwing him onto a makeshift funeral pyre.

After Walker's brutal murder, most of his remains were scavenged by souvenir hunters. Several members of the mob gathered some of his charred remains in a small box and dropped them off at the local hospital. On the box, there was a note that read: "Return to his friends."

== Media response ==
Not long after the lynching, the Coatesville Record newspaper reported that a large crowd of townsfolk had eagerly watched Walker's burning; some even collected his charred bones after the fire died down. The Record interviewed Edgar Rice's widow, who was very upset because she had not personally lit Walker's pyre.

Outside Coatesville, nearly every newspaper condemned Walker's lynching as an act of inhumanity. Former President Theodore Roosevelt publicly condemned lynching in general. The New York Evening Post proclaimed shock that such a brutal lynching could take place in a Northern state. The Atlanta Journal noted the practice of lynching could no longer be seen as an exclusively Southern crime. The Richmond Planet suggested that African Americans might arm themselves to prevent further lynchings.

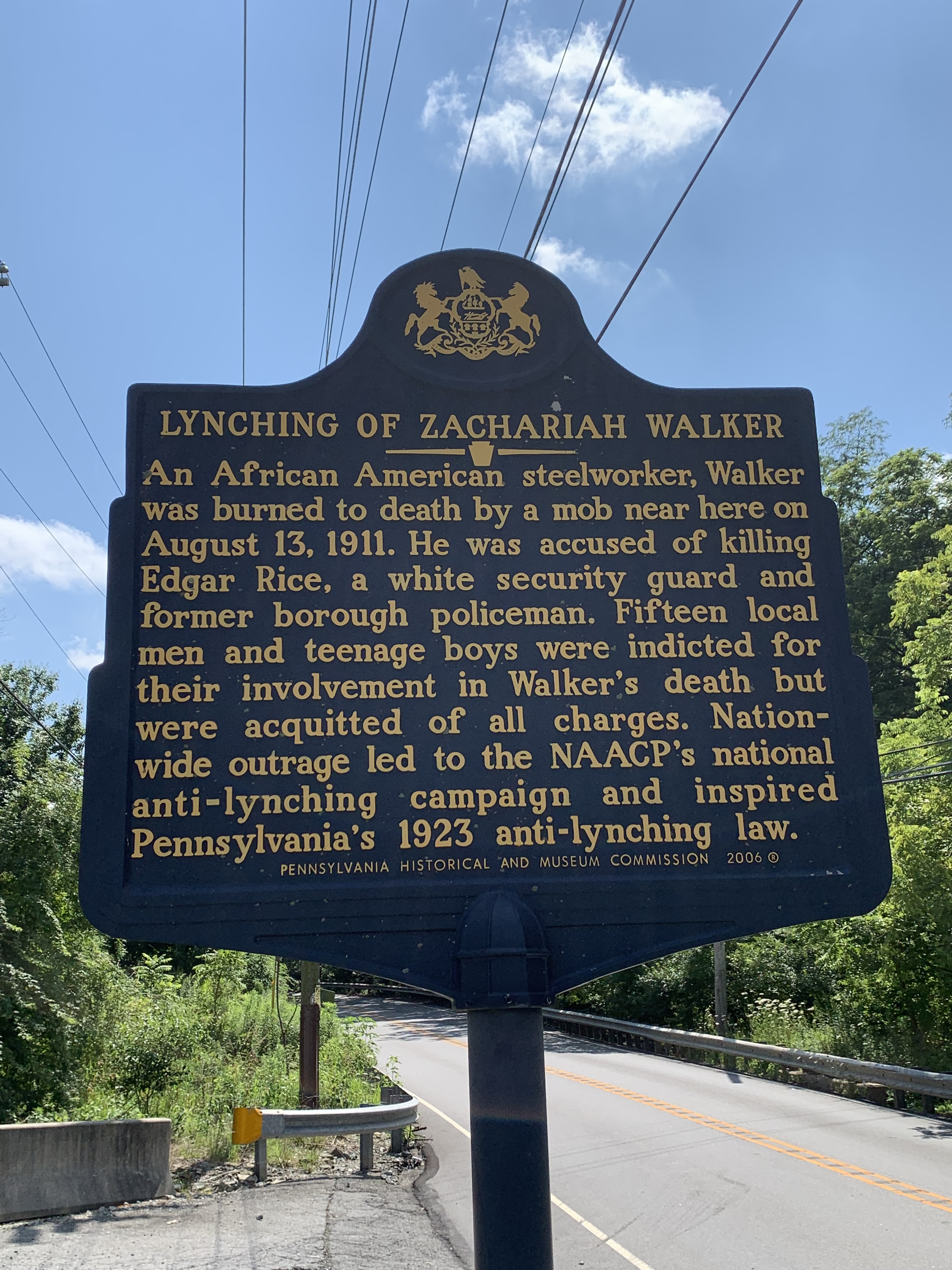
Historical marker erected in 2006

== Legal response ==
Pennsylvania authorities vigorously investigated the lynching, but were constantly impeded by white Coatesville residents who refused to cooperate with authorities and journalists. According to reporter William Ellis, Coatesville residents seemed to condemn journalists rather than Walker's lynch mob.

Nevertheless, a month after Walker's death, the state of Pennsylvania indicted six men for murder. All of them were subsequently acquitted. Several other defendants who were later indicted were also cleared of crimes. The leading defense attorney was Wilmer W. MacElree, "the legal sage of Chester County."

Not long after all of Walker's suspected killers were acquitted, Governor John K. Tener called the residents of Coatesville a disgrace to the Commonwealth of Pennsylvania for either carrying out or aiding murder.

== Legacy ==
According to historian William Ziglar, the murder of Zachariah Walker became one of the best-known lynchings of its time because of its unusually brutal nature and because it took place in a state which was seen as historically tolerant of African Americans.

Walker's lynching led many northern African Americans to worry about America's lack of racial justice. After a meeting in Denver, Colorado, the National Negro Educational Association came to the conclusion that white people and African Americans lived under different rules in the same country.

Zachariah Walker was the last of eight known people to be lynched in Pennsylvania.

== Bibliography ==
- Hyser, Raymond (April 1987). ""A Crooked Death": Coatesville, Pennsylvania and the Lynching of Zachariah Walker". Pennsylvania History: A Journal of Mid-Atlantic Studies. 54 (2): 85–102. JSTOR 27773172.
- Ziglar, William (April 1982). ""Community on Trial": The Coatesville Lynching of 1911". The Pennsylvania Magazine of History and Biography. 106 (2): 245–270. JSTOR 20091665.
