= Coatesville, Pennsylvania =

City in Pennsylvania, US

- City
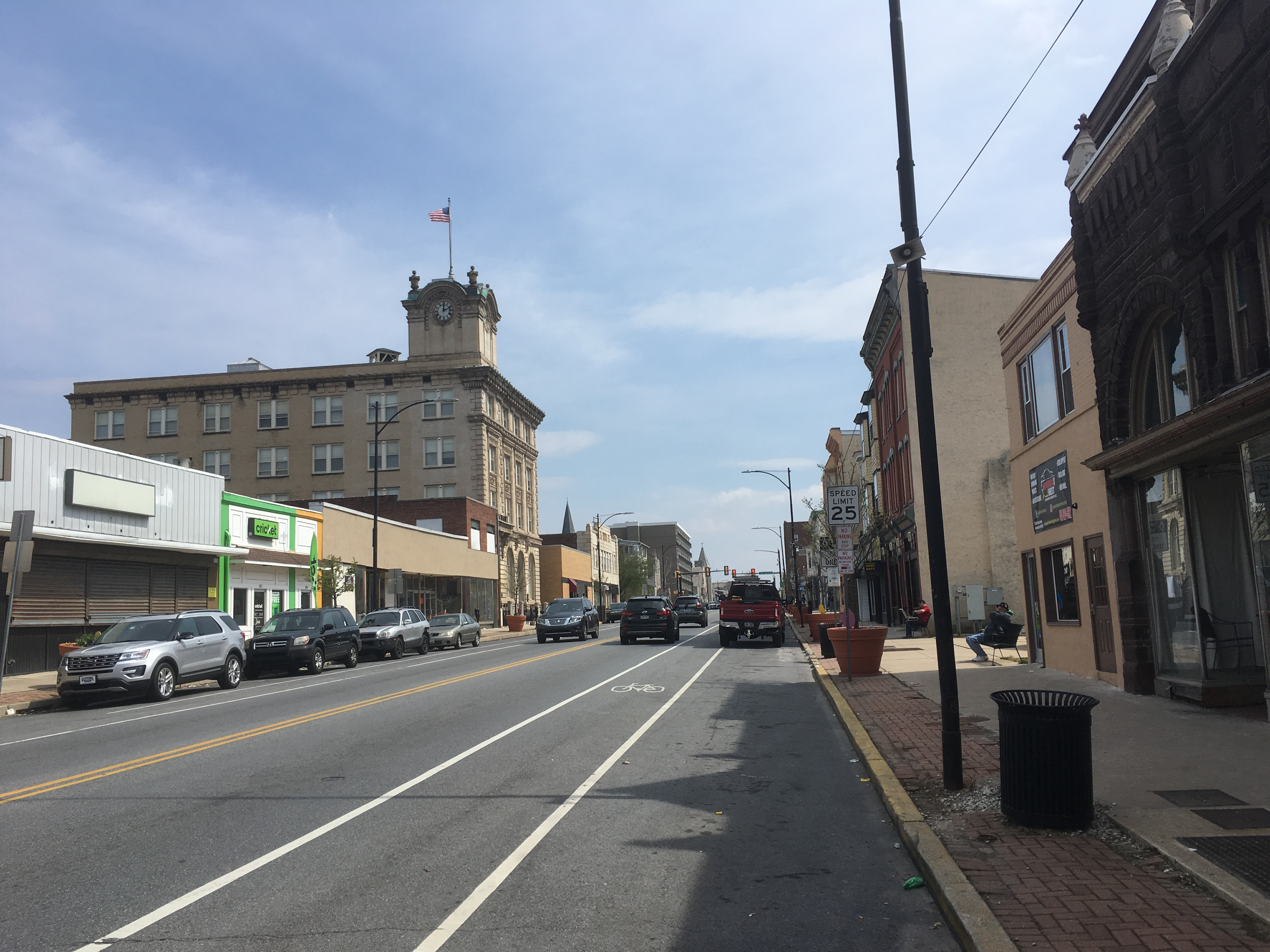
- Lincoln Highway in Coatesville

- Flag Symbol

- Location in Chester County and the U.S. state of Pennsylvania.

- Location in Pennsylvania Location in the United States
- Coordinates: 39°59′1″N 75°49′0″W
- Country: United States
- State: Pennsylvania
- Pennsylvania: Chester
- Incorporated: 1915

Area
  - Total: 1.83 sq mi (4.73 km^{2})
  - Land: 1.81 sq mi (4.68 km^{2})
  - Water: 0.019 sq mi (0.05 km^{2})
- Elevation: 331 ft (101 m)

Population (2020)
  - Total: 13,350
  - Density: 7,381.9/sq mi (2,850.18/km^{2})
- Time zone: UTC-5 (EST)
  - Summer (DST): UTC-4 (EDT)
- ZIP Code: 19320
- Area codes: 610 and 484
- FIPS code: 42-14712
- Website: coatesville.org

Coatesville is the only city in Chester County, Pennsylvania, United States. The population was 13,350 at the 2020 census. Coatesville is approximately 39 miles west of Philadelphia. It developed along the Philadelphia and Lancaster Turnpike beginning in the late 18th century. It spans U.S. Route 30, the Main Line highway that runs west of Philadelphia.

Coatesville developed in the early 20th century with the growth of the Lukens Steel Company and other industry. Its population declined after industrial restructuring, which reduced these jobs. Lukens was bought by the Bethlehem Steel Corporation in 1997. Since 2020, the steel mill has been owned and operated by Cleveland-Cliffs. The steel mill is the is oldest and longest continuously operating mill in the United States.

== Revitalization and Development ==
The City of Coatesville is undergoing a significant period of revitalization that represents one of the most extensive redevelopment efforts in its modern history. These initiatives encompass infrastructure upgrades, transportation improvements, economic development, public space enhancements, and neighborhood investment. As part of this effort, the city has undertaken improvements including new sidewalks, upgraded street lighting, modernized traffic signals, enhanced crosswalks, and park renovations. Together, these changes are intended to strengthen Coatesville's downtown core and support long-term commercial growth.

Over the last several years, more than forty economic development projects have been initiated throughout the city, with several projects recently completed. Combined public and private investment associated with these efforts exceeds $200 million. A major component of this redevelopment is transportation infrastructure. A newly constructed Coatesville Train Station, totaling $65 million, is planned to open in 2027 between Third Avenue & Fourth Avenue and Fleetwood Street. The station will provide continued access to Amtrak's Keystone Service line and reintroduce SEPTA's Regional Rail service, improving regional connectivity between Coatesville, Harrisburg, Philadelphia, and surrounding communities. In conjunction with the station, plans are in place for the construction of a municipal parking garage within the downtown district to improve access to nearby retail, dining establishments, and transit services.

== Economy and Major Employers ==
Coatesville's economy includes a mix of industrial, healthcare, educational, and technology-oriented sectors. Among the largest employers in the city's 19320 ZIP code area are Communications Test Design, Inc. (CTDI), which provides global engineering, technical, repair, and logistics services; Cleveland-Cliffs, a steel manufacturing company; the Coatesville Veterans Affairs Medical Center, a major healthcare provider in the region; the Coatesville Area School District; and Piasecki Aircraft, which specializes in advanced aircraft design and engineering.

== Parks, Recreation, and Cultural Amenities ==
The city maintains eight public parks offering playgrounds, cookout/outdoor meal areas, and athletic fields and courts.

Ash Park, a 9.3-acre recreational area in the heart of the city, reopened in July 2026 after an extensive $4 million renovation project. Improvements included new basketball courts, pavilions, horseshoe pits, water features, and other amenities. In October 2026, the city was awarded a $908,900 grant to continue the next phase of renovations at Ash Park. Plans call for a new loop trail, ADA-accessible pathways connecting the park, a fully accessible playground, an updated multi-use sports field, and a new entrance from South Fourth Avenue. Visitors can also expect new benches and seating areas, fencing and railings around recreational spaces, updated signage, better lighting, landscaping, and utility upgrades.

Abdala Park, located in the eastern part of the city, includes a recently installed outdoor fitness court designed to provide a short-duration, full-body workout.

Coatesville's Historic District contains numerous buildings and sites listed on the National Register of Historic Places, reflecting the city's industrial heritage. The district is also home to the National Iron & Steel Heritage Museum, which documents the region's historical role in iron and steel production.

== Notable annual events ==
The Coatesville Invitational Vintage Grand Prix is a three day vintage auto and motorcycle event showcasing historic vehicles from the early 1900s through the early 1980s. Although called a "Grand Prix," it is not an actual race—the vehicles run untimed exhibition laps, and winners are selected based on how well they embody the spirit and heritage of the event. The event was held annually from 2016 to 2023. It is currently on hiatus to redesign and expand the event.

Unity Day is organized and sponsored by the City of Coatesville (supported by local sponsors and volunteers) and held at Gateway Park. The summer event is free to the public and designed to promote diversity, inclusiveness, and community pride. Unity Day usually features family activities, food trucks, games, music, dancing, vendors, and fireworks.

First Fridays are monthly downtown signature events hosted by 2nd Century Alliance, in partnership with the City of Coatesville, featuring local artisans, crafts, activities, food vendors, live entertainment, and themed cultural celebrations from May through October along 1st to 3rd Avenues and Lincoln Highway in the Historic Downtown District.

The Sounds of Summer Music Series is an annual summer concert series featuring live jazz, rock, and R&B bands. Held in Gateway Park under the lights and evening stars, the series is free and open to the public. The Sounds of Summer Music Series is organized and sponsored by the City of Coatesville and community partners.

The Annual Coatesville Area Economic Forum (ACE) is an annual economic development conference hosted by the City of Coatesville, bringing together local and state leaders, speakers, business owners, investors, entrepreneurs, and community stakeholders to learn about and discuss the City's economic development progress, milestones, and future development opportunities. ACE is held in the fall.

== History ==
=== Beginnings ===
Varying cultures of Native Americans lived in this area. The first known settlement in the area which would be known as Coatesville was a historic Lenape village built along the West Branch of the Brandywine River. This settlement was a post for fur trading with the earliest American settlers. The Brandywine River has featured prominently in the history of Coatesville.

William Fleming, originally from Scotland, is one of the earliest landowners on record. He built a log cabin in the area of Harmony Street and 5th Avenue and owned about 207 acres (0.84 km^{2}) of land bordering the Brandywine River.

Moses Coates, a prosperous farmer and the namesake of Coatesville, bought the cabin from Fleming's son in 1787. With the economy rising in the years after the United States gained independence, Moses Coates' son-in-law, Jesse Kersey, came up with a plan to develop the area by selling frontage on the recently completed Lancaster Turnpike which crossed through their land. The Lancaster Turnpike was the first toll road in the U.S., authorized in 1792 and completed in 1795. A tollgate was located within the present-day Coatesville city limits. Because Coatesville was located roughly halfway between Philadelphia and Lancaster on the turnpike, it became a popular stopping place.

Pierre Bizallion, a French fur trader, settled in the area in the early 18th century. He was said to serve as an interpreter between William Penn and Native American peoples. The Veterans Administration Hospital now occupies a large piece of the roughly 500 acres (2.0 km^{2}) of land that was once owned by Bizallion.

=== 19th century ===
Before Coatesville became a city, the only one in Chester County, it was called Bridge-Town, after the two bridges crossing the Brandywine River. A village named "Midway", named after its station owned by the Philadelphia and Columbia Railroad midway between Philadelphia and Lancaster, was formed in 1834 on the western bank of the Brandywine. The villages of Midway and Bridge-Town merged in 1867 to become the borough of Coatesville. Coatesville citizens voted to become a city in 1915.

Coatesville exploited the natural energy of the Brandywine River. Jesse Kersey, Moses Coates' son-in-law, partnered with the ironmaster Isaac Pennock and purchased over 110 acres (0.45 km^{2}) of Moses Coates' farm along both sides of the Brandywine River in 1810. They formed the Brandywine Iron Works and Nail Factory, the forerunner of Lukens Steel. Charles Lukens married Isaac Pennock's daughter Rebecca in 1813. Following her husband's death in 1825, Rebecca Lukens took over the operations of the mill, purchasing it from her mother. She directed operations through a period of turmoil and market panic, developing it into a prosperous mill. Rebecca Lukens was one of the first women to operate a major corporation in the United States.

=== 20th century ===
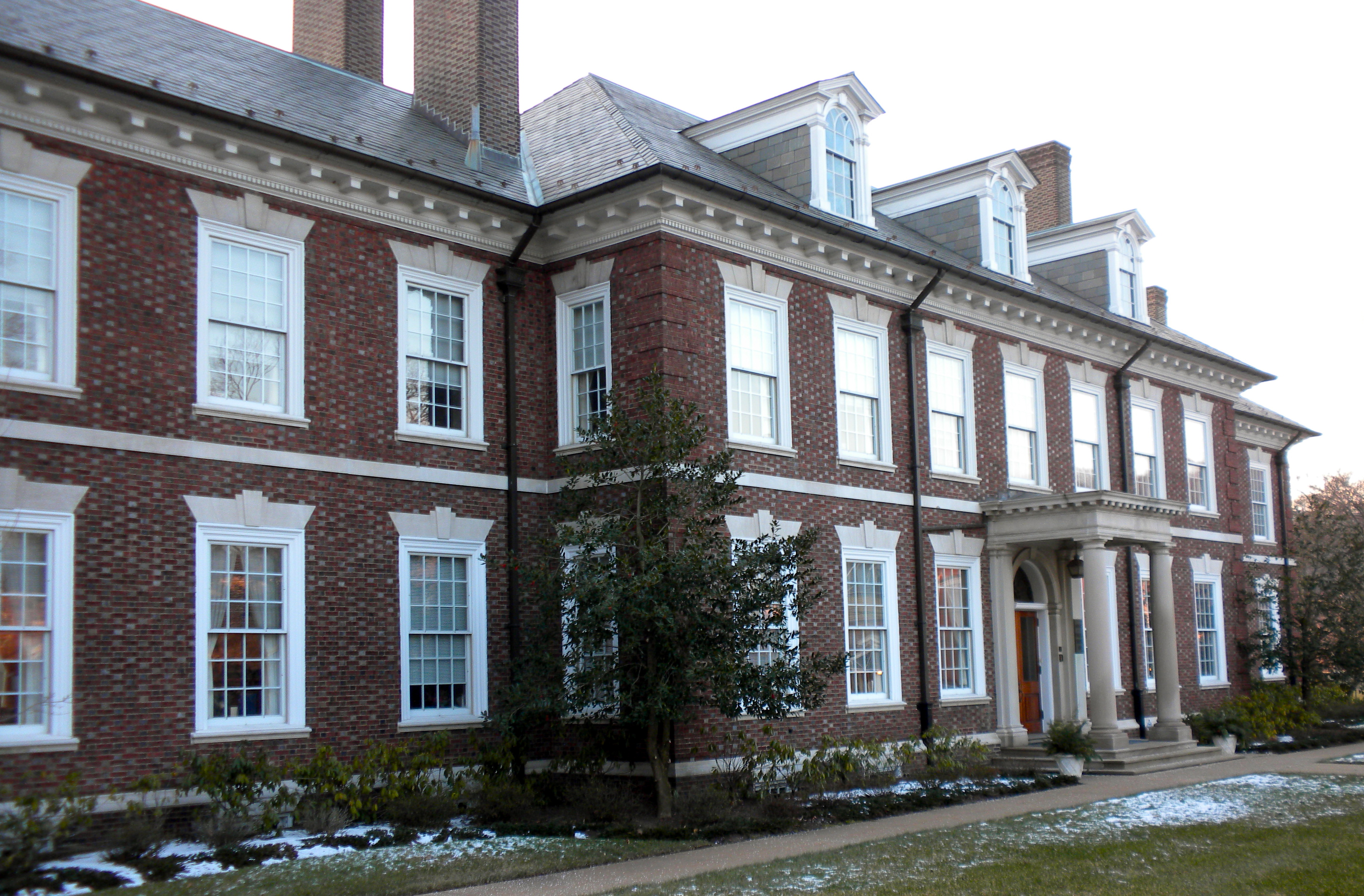
Main Office of Lukens Steel

As Lukens Steel grew so did Coatesville, eventually becoming known as the "Pittsburgh of the East." By the beginning of the 20th century the population had grown to 6,000, attracting immigrants from Eastern and Southern Europe to its industrial jobs, as well as both black and white migrants from the rural South. Tensions rose in the city as the population rapidly became more diverse.

In August 1911, steelworker Zachariah Walker was lynched in Coatesville; he had left his wife and children in Virginia while seeking better work. This African-American man was accused of killing Deputy Constable/Coal and Iron Policeman Edgar Rice, a popular figure in town. Walker claimed self-defense and was hospitalized after his arrest. He was dragged from the hospital and burned to death in front of a mob of hundreds in a field south of the city. Fifteen men and teenage boys were indicted, but all were acquitted at trials. The lynching was the last in Pennsylvania and is said to have left a permanent stain on the city's image.

Walker's murder was investigated by the National Association for the Advancement of Colored People (NAACP), which called for an end to lynching nationwide. Pennsylvania passed a state anti-lynching law in 1923. But, even after passage of an anti-lynching House bill in the 1920s, no federal law was passed because of the power of the Democratic southern bloc in the Senate. At that time, it represented only white southerners; African Americans had been disfranchised in the South since the turn of the century.

Racial violence was spreading all across America during the Red Summer of 1919 and the local African-American community was on edge. On July 8, 1919, the black community of Coatesville formed a large armed protection group to prevent the rumored lynching of a rape suspect. When the armed group surrounded the jail to prevent the attack, they learned that there was no suspect and no lynch mob.

In 1929, the Coatesville Veterans Medical Center was built with an original mission to provide neuropsychiatric care to veterans. In 2013, the Medical Center, with its distinctive architecture of Colonial Revival and Classical Revival, was listed on the National Register of Historic Places. The Medical Center now provides a range of health care services to more than 19,000 veterans in Pennsylvania and Delaware.

The school system expanded to keep up and the religious community became more diverse, with Roman Catholic churches founded and Beth Israel Congregation, one of Chester County's few synagogues. In 1932 there were a total of 22 churches of various denominations in the city.

After World War II the steel industry began a long decline, but in the 1960s Lukens Steel was still the largest employer in Chester County, with over 10,000 workers. It finally started to restructure due to industry changes, was sold several times, and its workers were reduced in number to 5,000 and eventually to 2,000.

=== 21st century ===
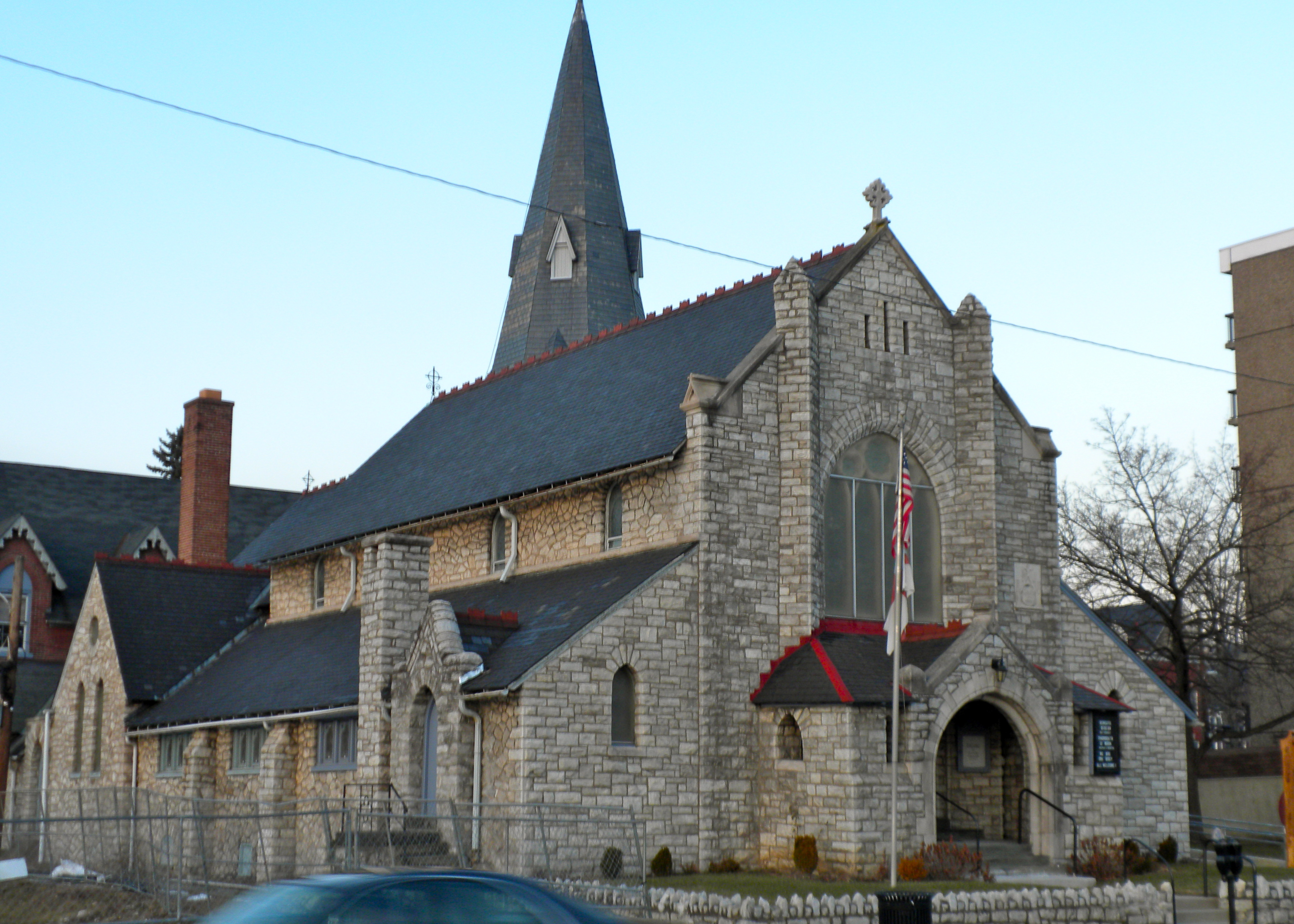
Episcopal Church of the Trinity, 323 East Lincoln Highway

Since the turn of the century, Coatesville has invested in redevelopment, encouraging private projects. It has torn down public housing and encouraged new single family and townhouse developments. A new Marriott Courtyard hotel, built along Route 82 on the outskirts of Coatesville, opened in May 2012.

The redevelopment plans have generated controversy. The city was involved in a 5-year eminent domain dispute with a local landowner in neighboring Valley Township. It was resolved without the need to seize the property, but displeasure with the events resulted in the city voters turning out four incumbent city councilpersons in the November 2005 general elections. Two of the four new councilpersons were ordained Pentecostal and Methodist ministers, respectively. The city council fired the city solicitor, and accepted the resignation of the city manager (who had negotiated with the Valley Township landowner). The assistant manager, police chief, and city treasurer also resigned.

A series of arsons took place in the city from 2007 to early 2009. A December 2008 fire at a Strode Avenue home resulted in the death of Irene Kempest, an 83-year-old World War II Holocaust survivor. A fire the following month on the 300 block of Fleetwood Street burned 17 row houses, causing $2 million in damage and leaving dozens of people homeless. By March 2009, police had arrested six suspects in the fires. A total of nearly 70 fires occurred during this period. On June 8, 2010 one man, pleading no-contest due to mental illness, was sentenced to a 60-year prison sentence for five of the fires, one of which resulted in Kempest's death. Another man pleaded guilty to the Fleetwood Street fire and eight others, receiving a sentence of 12.5 to 25 years with an order to pay $2.5 million in restitution. Twenty of the nearly 70 fires over the two-year span remain unsolved.

In 1969, Lukens Steel forged steel beams for the World Trade Center during its construction in New York City. Some of these trident beams, known as "trees", remained standing after the 9/11 Terrorist Attacks. Ten of the "trees" that remained were transported to Coatesville on April 15, 2010. They are to be used as a part of the proposed National Iron and Steel Heritage Museum.

Twenty-one sites including the Coatesville Historic District, Clement Atkinson Memorial Hospital, High Bridge, Abram Huston House and Carriage House, Lukens Historic District, Lukens Main Office Building, National Bank of Coatesville Building, Terracina, Carver Court, and Coatesville Veterans Affairs Medical Center are resources listed on the National Register of Historic Places.

== Geography ==
According to the U.S. Census Bureau, the city has a total area of 1.9 square miles (4.9 km^{2}), of which 0.53% is water.

=== Climate ===
Coatesville has a typical Northeast climate with cold, snowy winters and hot humid summers. It has a hot-summer humid continental climate (Dfa) and the hardiness zone is 6b bordering 7a.

Climate data for Coatesville, Pennsylvania
Month	Jan	Feb	Mar	Apr	May	Jun	Jul	Aug	Sep	Oct	Nov	Dec	Year
Mean daily maximum °C (°F)	3.7 (38.7)	4 (40)	10.2 (50.4)	16.8 (62.2)	22.7 (72.9)	27.4 (81.3)	29.9 (85.8)	28.7 (83.7)	25.4 (77.7)	19.1 (66.3)	11.9 (53.4)	5.3 (41.6)	17.1 (62.8)
Mean daily minimum °C (°F)	−6.2 (20.8)	−6.2 (20.9)	−1.4 (29.4)	3.8 (38.8)	9.5 (49.1)	14.6 (58.3)	17.3 (63.2)	16.3 (61.3)	12.4 (54.3)	5.7 (42.3)	0.4 (32.8)	−4.6 (23.8)	5.1 (41.2)
Average precipitation mm (inches)	91 (3.6)	84 (3.3)	97 (3.8)	94 (3.7)	99 (3.9)	110 (4.5)	110 (4.4)	110 (4.5)	94 (3.7)	84 (3.3)	84 (3.3)	97 (3.8)	1,160 (45.8)
Source: Weatherbase

== Demographics ==
Historical population
Census	Pop.	Note	%±
1870	2,025		—
1880	2,766		36.6%
1890	3,680		33.0%
1900	5,721		55.5%
1910	11,084		93.7%
1920	14,515		31.0%
1930	14,582		0.5%
1940	14,006		−4.0%
1950	13,826		−1.3%
1960	12,971		−6.2%
1970	12,331		−4.9%
1980	10,698		−13.2%
1990	11,038		3.2%
2000	10,838		−1.8%
2010	13,100		20.9%
2020	13,350		1.9%
U.S. Decennial Census

=== Racial and ethnic composition ===
Coatesville city, Pennsylvania – Racial and ethnic composition Note: the US Census treats Hispanic/Latino as an ethnic category. This table excludes Latinos from the racial categories and assigns them to a separate category. Hispanics/Latinos may be of any race.
Race / Ethnicity (NH = Non-Hispanic)	Pop 1990	Pop 2000	Pop 2010	Pop 2020	% 1990	% 2000	% 2010	% 2020
White alone (NH)	6,079	4,040	3,565	3,137	55.07%	37.28%	27.21%	23.50%
Black or African American alone (NH)	4,322	5,235	5,841	5,864	39.16%	48.30%	44.59%	43.93%
Native American or Alaska Native alone (NH)	15	30	37	24	0.14%	0.28%	0.28%	0.18%
Asian alone (NH)	51	49	109	149	0.46%	0.45%	0.83%	1.12%
Native Hawaiian or Pacific Islander alone (NH)	N/A	1	9	0	N/A	0.01%	0.07%	0.00%
Other race alone (NH)	21	19	27	79	0.19%	0.18%	0.21%	0.59%
Mixed race or Multiracial (NH)	N/A	299	504	741	N/A	2.76%	3.85%	5.55%
Hispanic or Latino (any race)	550	1,165	3,008	3,355	4.98%	10.75%	22.96%	25.13%
Total	11,038	10,838	13,100	13,350	100.00%	100.00%	100.00%	100.00%

=== 2020 census ===
As of the 2020 census, Coatesville had a population of 13,350. The median age was 31.5 years. 30.9% of residents were under the age of 18 and 10.4% of residents were 65 years of age or older. For every 100 females there were 90.9 males, and for every 100 females age 18 and over there were 85.9 males age 18 and over.

100.0% of residents lived in urban areas, while 0.0% lived in rural areas.

There were 4,747 households in Coatesville, of which 39.6% had children under the age of 18 living in them. Of all households, 27.3% were married-couple households, 22.3% were households with a male householder and no spouse or partner present, and 41.7% were households with a female householder and no spouse or partner present. About 29.0% of all households were made up of individuals and 10.1% had someone living alone who was 65 years of age or older.

There were 5,221 housing units, of which 9.1% were vacant. The homeowner vacancy rate was 1.3% and the rental vacancy rate was 7.9%.

Racial composition as of the 2020 census
Race	Number	Percent
White	3,617	27.1%
Black or African American	6,114	45.8%
American Indian and Alaska Native	108	0.8%
Asian	151	1.1%
Native Hawaiian and Other Pacific Islander	2	0.0%
Some other race	1,688	12.6%
Two or more races	1,670	12.5%
Hispanic or Latino (of any race)	3,355	25.1%

=== 2010 census ===
The 2010 United States census stated there were 13,100 people, 4,498 households, and 2,889 families residing in the city, with a population density of 6,894.7 people per square mile (2,673.5/km^{2}). The racial makeup of the city was 38.0% White, 46.4% African American, 0.5% Native American, 0.8% Asian, 0.1% Pacific Islander, 8.9% from other races, and 5.3% from two or more races. Hispanic or Latino people of any race were 23.0% of the population.

There were 4,498 households, out of which 36.5% had children under the age of 18 living with them, 28.3% were married couples living together, 27.7% had a female householder with no spouse present, 8.2% had a male householder with no spouse present, and 35.8% were non-families. 42.4% of all households had individuals under 18 living in them, and 19.5% had someone living alone who was 65 years of age or older. The average household size was 2.86 and the average family size was 3.46.

In the city, the population was spread out, with 30.4% under the age of 18. The median age was 31 years. The population was 50.6% female and 49.4% male.

Coatesville had 4,998 housing units, of which 90.2% were occupied. Of the occupied housing units, 37.5% were owner-occupied.

=== 2000 census ===
In 2000, the median income for a household in the city was $29,912, and the median income for a family was $36,375. Males had a median income of $31,782 versus $24,774 for females. The per capita income for the city was $14,079. About 18.3% of families and 22.1% of the population were below the poverty line, including 28.9% of those under age 18 and 15.9% of those age 65 or over.

== Government ==
The City is a Third Class City and is governed by a Council–Manager form of government. There are seven council members, one for each of the five voting wards and two elected At-Large. For the first time in Coatesville's history, the council currently consists of all women.

=== Council Members ===
as of January 2024:

Ward	Council member	Party	Term ends
1	Fran Scamuffa	Republican	2028
2	Tiniera Turner-Green	Independent	2030
3	C. Arvilla Hunt	Democratic	2028
4	Khadijah Al Amin	Democratic	2030
5	Linda Lavender Norris	Republican	2028
At-Large	Carmen Green	Democratic	2030
At-Large	Charrisse Allen	Democratic	2030

== Education ==
Coatesville Area School District is the public school district for the municipality. Scott Middle School is located in the city.

Harcum College has an enrollment office in Coatesville, providing adults with access to accredited online associate degree programs.

Delaware County Community College operates the Coatesville Training and Education Center, designed to prepare students for entry-level careers in facilities operations, building maintenance, property management support, and related skilled trades.

== Transportation ==
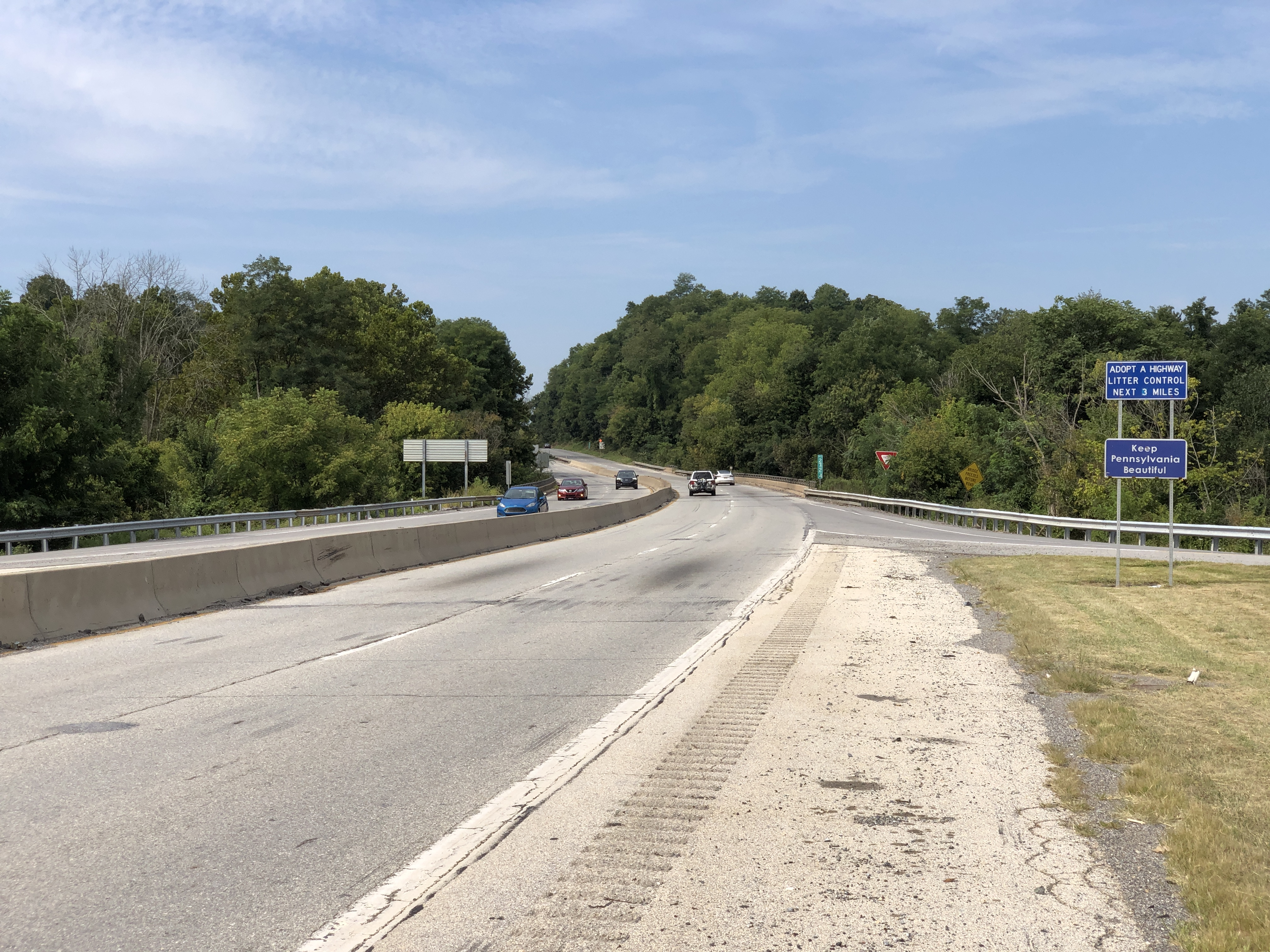
US 30 westbound in Coatesville

As of 2018, there were 31.15 miles (50.13 km) of public roads in Coatesville, of which 6.50 miles (10.46 km) were maintained by Pennsylvania Department of Transportation (PennDOT) and 24.65 miles (39.67 km) were maintained by the city.

The main east–west road serving Coatesville is US 30, which bypasses the city to the north on a freeway, provides access to Lancaster to the west and Philadelphia to the east. US 30 Business runs east–west through the heart of the city on Lincoln Highway. PA 82 is the main north–south road in Coatesville, running along Strode Avenue, Lincoln Highway, and North First Avenue, heading north to Elverson and south to Unionville and Kennett Square. PA 340 passes through PA 82 to the north of the city, providing additional access to Lancaster to the west and Downingtown to the east. PA 372 begins at PA 82 in southern Coatesville and heads west on Valley Road to Parkesburg and Atglen.

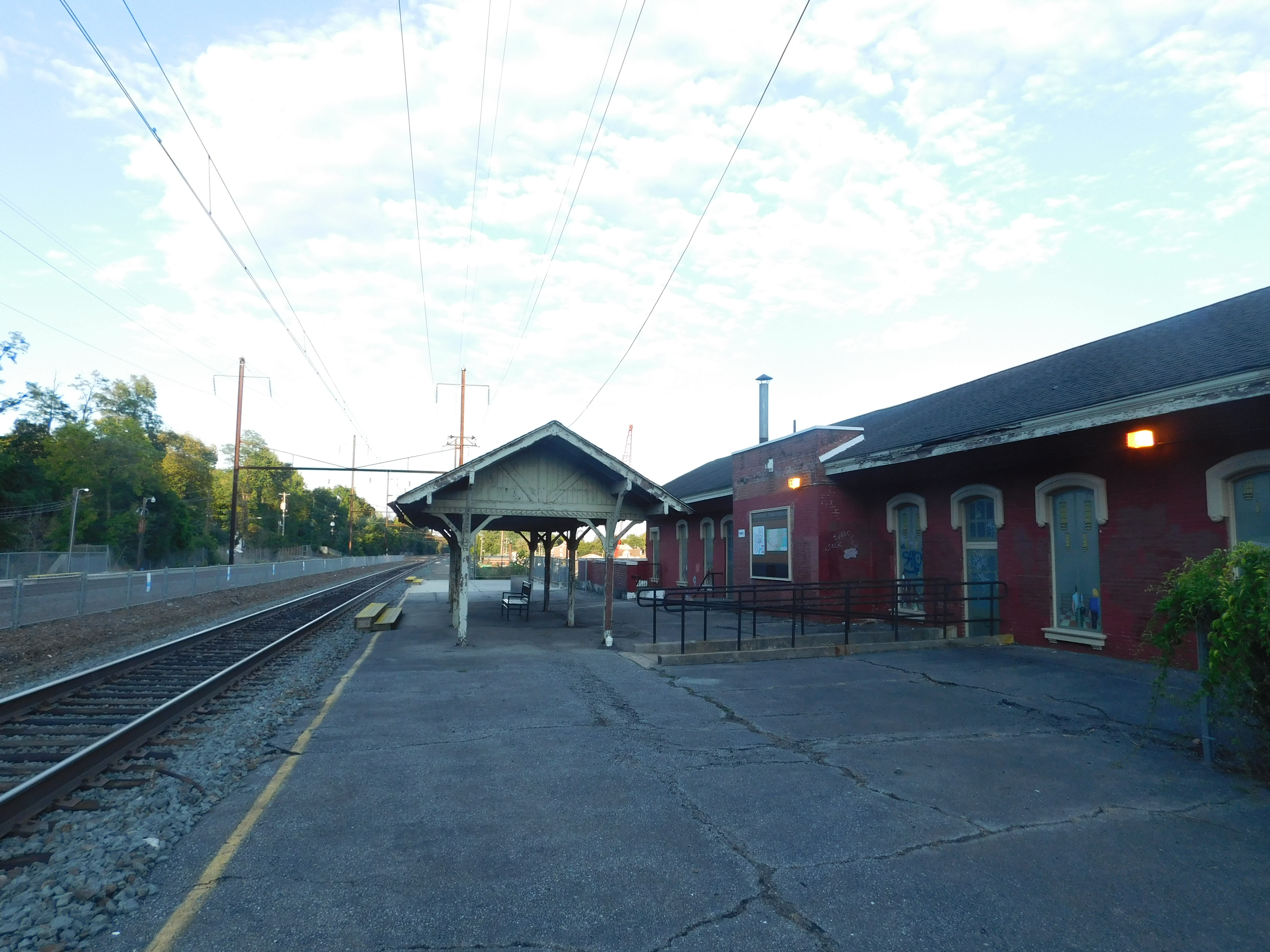
Coatesville Amtrak station

A general aviation airport, Chester County G. O. Carlson Airport, which allows private and corporate aircraft to easily access the town, is located about 3 miles (4.8 km) west in neighboring Valley Township. The nearest airport with commercial air service is the Philadelphia International Airport in Philadelphia.

Coatesville is served by the Coatesville Amtrak Station, which serves Keystone Service trains along the Keystone Corridor. Until 1997, the station also served SEPTA's R5 regional rail line from Philadelphia, which is now the Paoli/Thorndale Line and ends east of Coatesville in Thorndale. On March 7, 2019, it was announced that SEPTA service would return to Coatesville in the future with a new station to be built near the current Amtrak station that would serve an extension of the Paoli/Thorndale Line service. On July 13, 2021, the Pennsylvania Department of Transportation announced that it was soliciting bids for the construction of the new station, to be built at Third Avenue and Fleetwood Street. The new $65 million Coatesville Train Station is expected to open in 2027.

The Reading Company formerly had its own passenger station on the Wilmington and Northern Branch, located at the northwest corner of Lincoln Avenue and First Avenue.

Two bus services serve Coatesville. The Coatesville Link, which is operated by Krapf's Transit and managed by the Transportation Management Association of Chester County (TMACC), serves multiple points of interest between Coatesville and Parkesburg. SEPTA Suburban Bus Route 135 connects Coatesville with Downingtown, Exton, and West Chester. In addition, TMACC managed The Outfitter, which formerly provided bus service from Coatesville to the Urban Outfitters distribution center in Gap before it was discontinued on January 31, 2024.

== Notable people ==
Randolph Mantooth, actor, lived in Coatesville

- Whittier C. Atkinson, founder of the Clement Atkinson Memorial Hospital
- Vince Belnome, MLB infielder, Tampa Bay Rays
- Walt Downing, NFL center for the San Francisco 49ers (1978–1983)
- John A. Gibney Jr., United States district judge of the United States District Court for the Eastern District of Virginia
- Calvin Grove, professional boxer who won the IBF featherweight title in 1988
- Richard Hamilton, NBA All-Star guard for the Detroit Pistons and the Chicago Bulls
- Ralph Hudson, last person to be put to death by the state of New Jersey
- Billy Joe, 1963 rookie of the year for AFL Denver Broncos; member of the NFL champion New York Jets, 1969
- Joseph C. Keech (1833–1915), member of the Pennsylvania House of Representatives
- Ray Keech, auto racing pioneer in the 1920s, won the 1929 Indianapolis 500
- Terrance Laird, NCAA Division I collegiate sprinter
- Rodney Linderman, founding member of punk band The Dead Milkmen, grew up in the Coatesville area
- Rebecca Lukens, owner of Lukens Steel Company, first American female CEO of an industrial company
- Mary Alice Dorrance Malone (1950-2025), billionaire Campbell Soup heiress, lived in Coatesville
- Ed Marion (1927–2008), National Football League referee and union executive
- Fred Mascherino, musician and vocalist, Taking Back Sunday, The Color Fred, Terrible Things
- Charles Moore, Olympic champion, 400 m hurdles, Helsinki 1952
- Sara Jane Moore, pleaded guilty to an attempted assassination of President Gerald Ford
- Derrick Morgan, defensive end, Tennessee Titans
- John Grubb Parke, Union general during the American Civil War
- Rod Perry, actor best known for his role as Sgt. David "Deacon" Kay in the 1970s TV series S.W.A.T.
- Susan Richardson, actress, best known for her role as Susan Bradford on the television series Eight Is Enough
- Chris Scott, chef and restaurateur
- George A. Spratt (1870–1934), inventor and aviation pioneer associated with the Wright brothers
- Zack Steffen, professional soccer player for Manchester City
- Essie Mae Washington-Williams, daughter of Senator Strom Thurmond, grew up in Coatesville
- Avery Storm, born in Coatesville
- Johnny Weir, figure skater, Olympian, and TV personality
- John L. Withrow, minister, author
- Edmond W. Davis , Author, Professor, and Social Historian

== Legacy ==
- In 2006, a Pennsylvania historical marker was placed along PA 82 in East Fallowfield Township, where Zachariah Walker was lynched.
