= Coatesville Veterans Administration Hospital Historic District =

- U.S. National Register of Historic Places
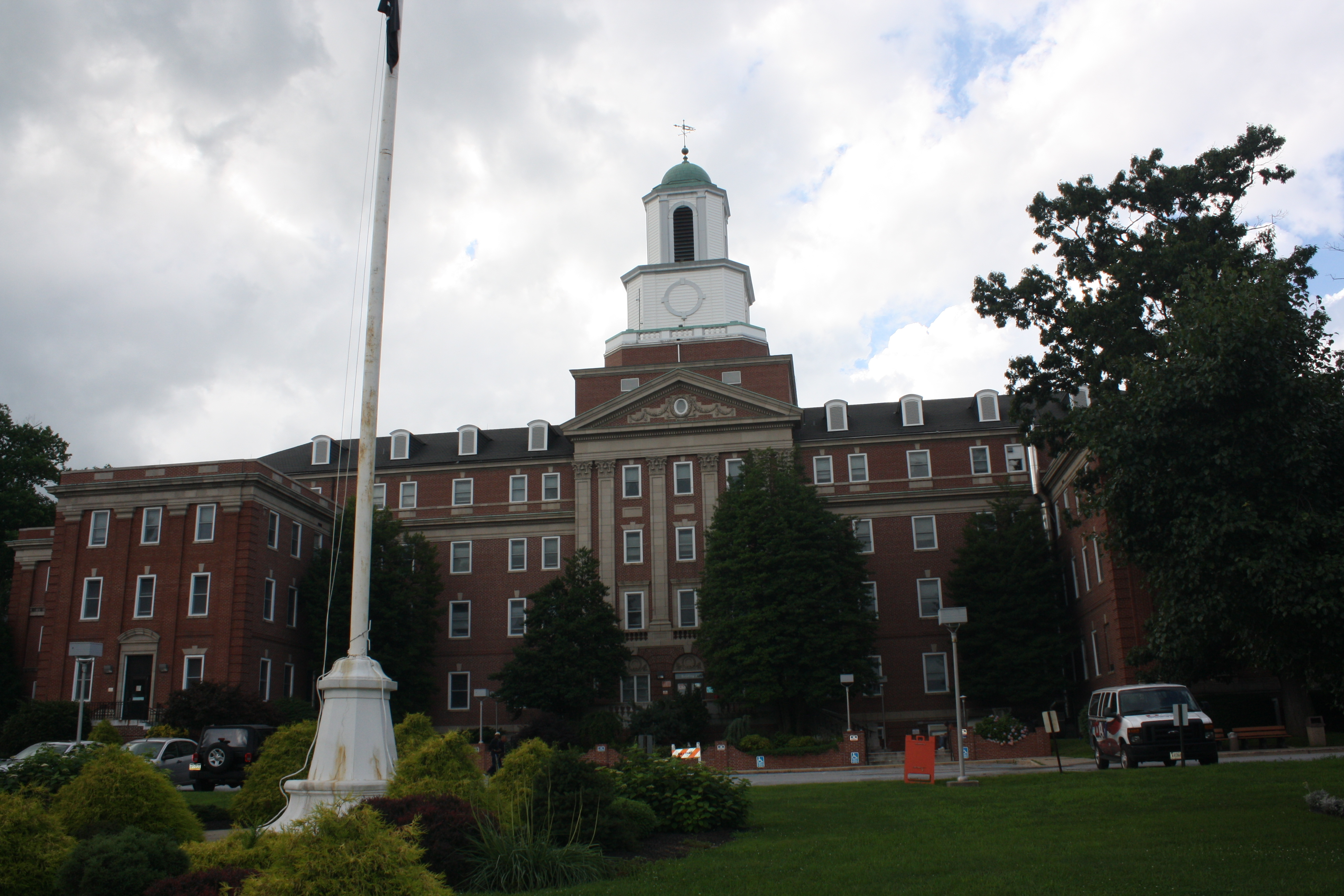

- Location within Pennsylvania
- Location: 1400 Blackhorse Hill Rd., Coatesville, Pennsylvania
- Coordinates: 39°59′53″N 75°47′47″W
- Area: 126 acres (51 ha)
- Built: 1929
- Built by: Veterans Bureau Construction Div.; VA Construction Service
- Architectural style: Colonial Revival, Classical Revival
- MPS: United States Second Generation Veterans Hospitals MPS
- NRHP reference No.: 13000059
- Added to NRHP: March 6, 2013

The Coatesville Veterans Affairs Medical Center, which is part of the Coatesville Veterans Administration Hospital Historic District, was built in 1929, and is located near Coatesville, Pennsylvania.

Listed on the National Register of Historic Places in 2013, this historic district includes thirty-seven contributing buildings, four contributing structures, one contributing object, and two contributing sites.

== History and architectural features ==
Built by the Veterans Bureau Construction Division and Veterans Administration Construction Service, structures in this historic district have been classified as examples of the Colonial Revival and Classical Revival periods.

"The original mission of the hospital was to provide neuropsychiatric care to veterans, and the historic district preserves the general characteristics" of the period. It conformed with a 2011 study of veterans hospitals nationwide.
