= Luciano (Jamaican singer) =

Jamaican singer

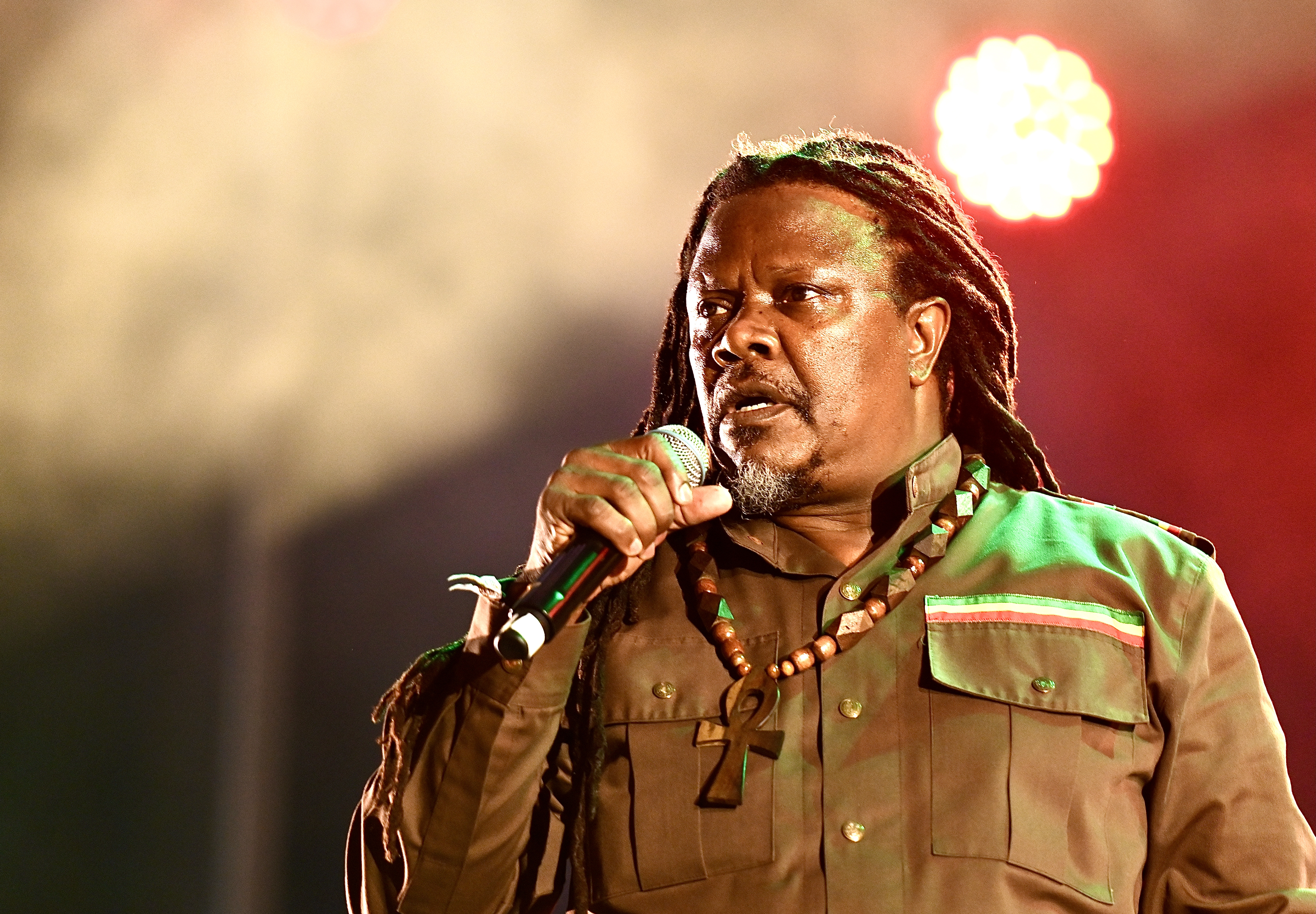
- Luciano in concert at Reggae Geel 2022

Background information
- Also known as: The Messenger, Jah Messenger
- Born: Jepther McClymont; 20 October 1964 (age 61); Davyton, Jamaica
- Genres: Reggae, roots reggae
- Occupation: Singer-songwriter
- Instrument: Guitar
- Years active: 1993–present
- Labels: RAS, Xterminator, VP
- Website: www.lucianomessenjah.com

Jepther McClymont OD (born 20 October 1964), better known as Luciano, is a Jamaican second-generation roots reggae singer.

== Career ==
Born in Davyton, Manchester Parish, and raised as the seventh of nine children in a strict Adventist family. Luciano began recording in 1992, with his first single "Ebony & Ivory" (on which he was credited as 'Stepper John') on the Aquarius Record label, followed by a split album with DJ Presley (now credited as 'Luciana') for producer Sky High. His first releases as Luciano included the hit single "Give My Love a Try", produced at Castro Brown's New Name Studio, followed by others produced by Brown, Freddie McGregor, Blacka Dread, and Sly and Robbie, including the 1993 no. 1 UK reggae hit "Shake It Up Tonight".

He started working with Philip "Fatis" Burrell, releasing the singles "Chant Out" and "Poor and Simple", with the album Moving Up following in late 1993. In 1994 he cut singles for Musclehead and Louie Culture before returning to work with Burrell for a series of successful singles and the album One Way Ticket, which saw Luciano at the forefront of the "Rasta Renaissance" in dancehall music. The renewal of Rastafarian influence into dancehall music in the early 1990s had begun with artists such as Tony Rebel and Garnett Silk. After Silk's death in late 1994, many looked to Luciano to continue consciousness in reggae music. Of Garnett Silk, he stated "Garnett was more like a brother, a father, a tutor, a forerunner. When he moved on I knew the work for me became harder still."

The following year brought the smash hit album Where There Is Life for Chris Blackwell's label Island Jamaica. It contained such hits as "It's Me Again Jah" (a no. 1 single in Jamaica), "Who Could It Be", as well as the title track. He recorded a second album for Island Jamaica in 1996 entitled Messenger (largely compiled from his hit singles), whose title track earned him his enduring nickname.

The majority of his recording in the mid-to-late 1990s was for Burrell and the Xterminator label, which by that time included such artists as Sizzla, Mikey General and Firehouse Crew, as well as recordings from Capleton and Cocoa Tea. Along with the work on the two albums for Island Jamaica, the majority of Luciano hits produced by Burrell were featured on 1999's Sweep Over My Soul. Burrell and Luciano parted ways in 1999.

By 2001, Luciano had released two live albums as well as two compilation albums alongside Sizzla and Anthony B after the split with Xterminator. That year saw the release of two new albums of material, Great Controversy on Jet Star and A New Day on VP Records. The latter received a nomination for Best Reggae Album at the 2002 Grammy Awards, and was executive produced by longtime saxophonist and touring partner Dean Fraser. The album received additional production from Sly & Robbie and was backed by Fraser and the Firehouse Crew.

Fraser continued to produce many of Luciano's albums throughout the decade, including 2008's Jah Is My Navigator. In 2010, he released United States of Africa. While the previous album had focused mostly on God, Africa dealt with global events. Of this, Luciano stated, "We're not just singing about Zion and all those glorious dreams. We're also dealing with issues that affect the people, their very minds."

He was awarded the Order of Distinction in the rank of Officer on 15 October 2007, in recognition of his contribution to reggae music.

In July 2009, Luciano paid his respects to fellow musician Michael Jackson by releasing a reggae tribute (on Lioni Records) of Jackson's iconic USA for Africa charity song, "We are the World".

Luciano's album Zion Awake was nominated for Best Reggae Album at the 58th Annual Grammy Awards.

In 2023, Rolling Stone ranked Luciano at number 143 on its list of the 200 Greatest Singers of All Time.

== Beliefs ==
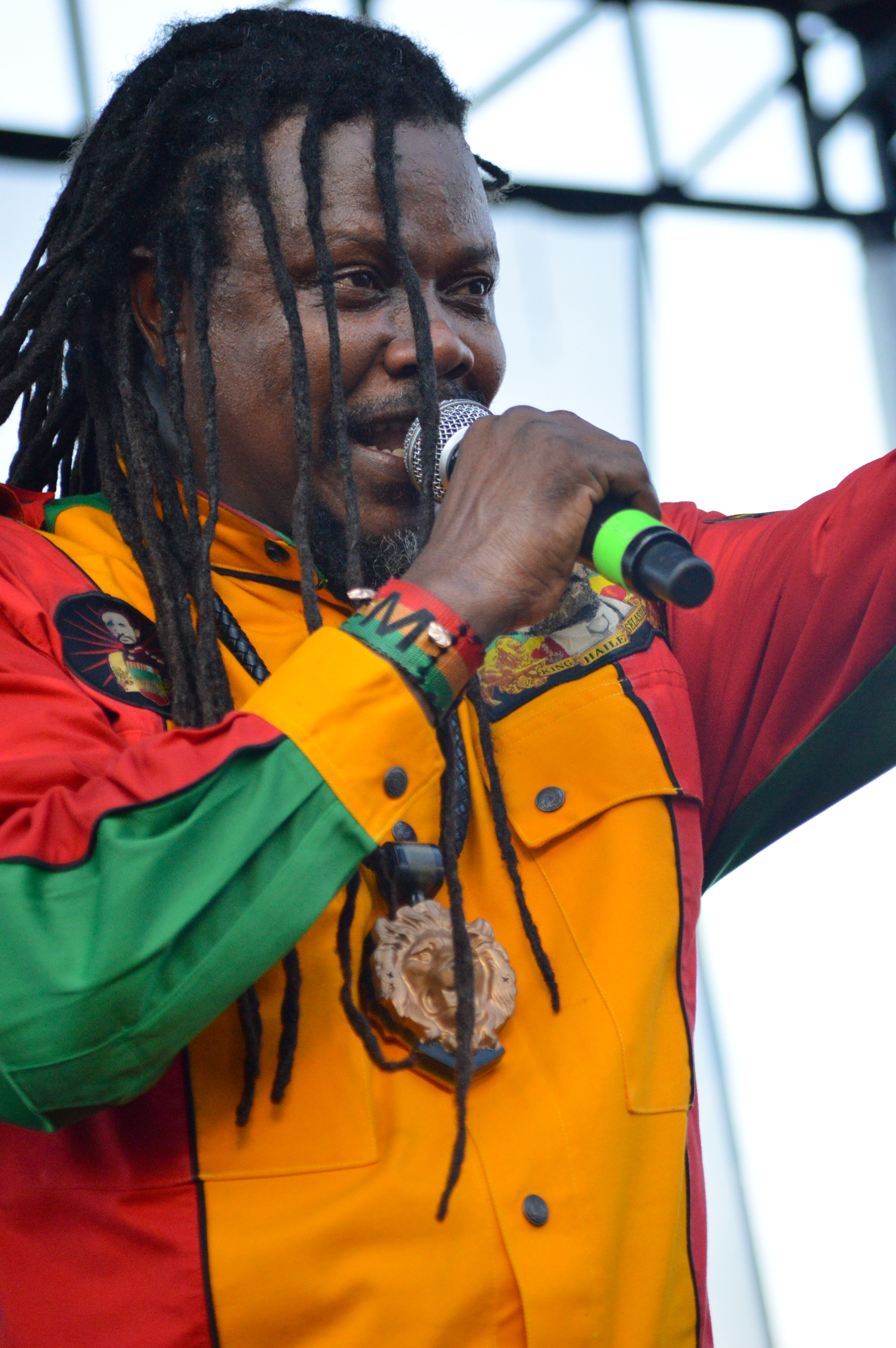
Luciano performing at the 2016 Palm Beach Jerk and Caribbean Culture Festival. West Palm Beach, Florida.

Luciano is a devout Rastafarian, whose lyrics promote consciousness and eschew slackness, or vulgarity, which is often prominent in reggae and dancehall music. He has criticized other Rastafarian reggae artists who record slackness material, describing them as having lost focus. The singer is known for reading Biblical verses prior to performances.

The singer is also an activist in the promotion of ganja, or marijuana, stating: "I'm not fighting for the decriminalisation of ganja, because it was never a criminal. My fight is to enlighten the people of the cannabis and let them know of the herbal properties and the benefits we can achieve from it."

== Personal life ==
In 2010, Luciano was reportedly given a tract of land for residence in the Gambia at the bequest of President Alhaji Dr Yahya Jammeh. The singer first performed in the country in 2001, and has stated his preference for eventually residing in Africa.

On 27 February 2016, Luciano's son Menelik McClymont was stabbed to death at the age of 19, in the vicinity of Parkington Plaza on Half-Way-Tree Road, St Andrew, Jamaica. He died of his wounds in hospital on 28 February.

== Awards and nominations ==
Year	Award	Category	Nominee/work	Result	Ref.
2002	44th Annual Grammy Awards	Best Reggae Album	A New Day	Nominated	
2016	58th Annual Grammy Awards	Best Reggae Album	Zion Awake	Nominated	

== Discography ==
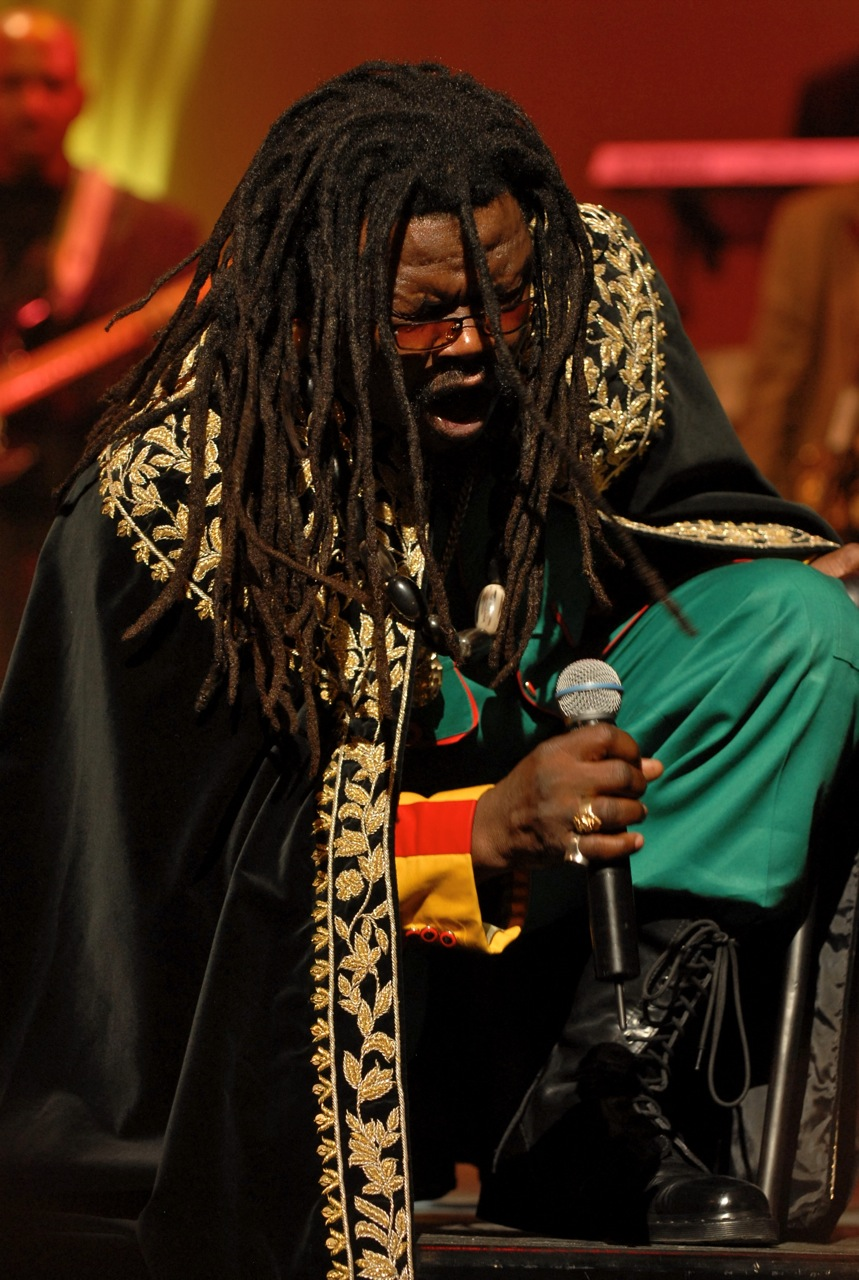
Luciano performing in 2007

=== Studio albums ===
- Shake It Up Tonight (1993)
- Moving Up (1993)
- Don't Get Crazy (1994)
- Back to Africa (1994)
- One Way Ticket (1994)
- After All (1995)
- Where There Is Life (1995)
- Messenger (1996)
- Sweep Over My Soul (1999)
- A New Day (2001)
- Great Controversy (2001)
- Serve Jah (2003)
- Visions (2003)
- Tell It from the Heart (2003)
- Serious Times (2004)
- Jah Words (2005)
- Gideon (2005)
- Child of a King (2006)
- God Is Greater than Man (2007)
- Jah Is My Navigator (2008)
- United States of Africa (2010)
- Write My Name (2010)
- Rub-A-Dub Market (2011)
- The Qabalah Man (2013)
- Zion Awake (2014)
- Embrace Your Failures (2017)
- In The Name of Love (2019)
- The Answer (2020)

=== Live albums ===
- Live (2000)
