= Saint Lucy (disambiguation) =

Saint Lucy (283–304) is a Christian saint who died during the Diocletianic Persecution.

Saint Lucy may also refer to:

== People ==
- Saints Lucy and Geminian, two Christian martyrs, the first believed identical with Lucy of Syracuse
- Saint Lucy Filippini, Catholic saint
- Saint Lucy Yi Zhenmei, Chinese martyr

== Other uses ==
- Saint Lucy, Barbados, the northernmost area in the country of Barbados
- Saint Lucy's Day, a Christian feast day observed on 13 December
- Lucy (given name), an English feminine given name

== See also ==
- St. Lucy's Church (disambiguation)
- Saint Lucy Parish (disambiguation)
- Saint Lucia (disambiguation)
- Saint Lucie (disambiguation)
- Santa Lucia (disambiguation)
- Santa Luzia (disambiguation)
