= Saint Lucia (disambiguation) =

Saint Lucia is an island country in the Caribbean.

Saint Lucia, St. Lucia or Sta. Lucia may also refer to:

== Places ==
=== Australia ===
- St Lucia, Queensland, a riverside suburb in the City of Brisbane, Queensland, Australia

=== South Africa ===
- St Lucia, South Africa, a settlement in Umkhanyakude District Municipality in the KwaZulu-Natal province of South Africa
- Lake St. Lucia, in KwaZulu-Natal

=== United States ===
- St. Lucia County, Florida, former Florida county from 1844 to 1855

=== Other places ===
- Saint Lucia, a town in Francisco Morazán Department, Honduras

== Other uses ==
- Saint Lucy, third-century Christian saint also known as Saint Lucia
  - Saint Lucy's Day, her feast day
  - Lucia, "dark Luz", or Lutzelfrau, a folkloric spirit associated with this day, the evil aspect of the Saint
- Saint Lucia amazon, a species of parrot in the family Psittacidae
- Saint Lucia lancehead, an endangered species of venomous snake from the West Indies
- Saint Lucia oriole, a species of bird, in the family Icteridae and genus Icterus
- Saint Lucia Labour Party, a social democratic political party in Saint Lucia
- Saint (drag queen), an American drag performer previously known as St. Lucia
- St. Lucia (musician), a South African singer and musician
- Sta. Lucia Realtors, a basketball team in the Philippines
- Sta. Lucia Mall, a shopping mall in Cainta, Rizal
- "St. Lucia", a song by Future from Save Me

== See also ==
- Lucia (disambiguation)
- Lucian (disambiguation)
- Saint Lucian (disambiguation)
- Saint Lucy (disambiguation)
- Santa Lucia (disambiguation)
- Santa Luzia (disambiguation)
- St. Lucie (disambiguation)
