= Dahdah =

Dahdah is an Arabic family name. Notable people with the surname include:

- Abu Dahdah, Syrian-born Spaniard member of Al Qaeda
- Edward al-Dahdah (1898–1945), Lebanese journalist
- Lucien Dahdah (1929–2003), Lebanese academic and businessman
- Paul Dahdah (born 1941), bishop of the Apostolic Vicariate of Beirut

== See also ==
- Abu Dahdah, alias of Imad Eddin Barakat Yarkas, Syrian-born Spaniard Al Qaeda member
- House of al-Dahdah, Lebanese Maronite Christian family
