= Lucien =

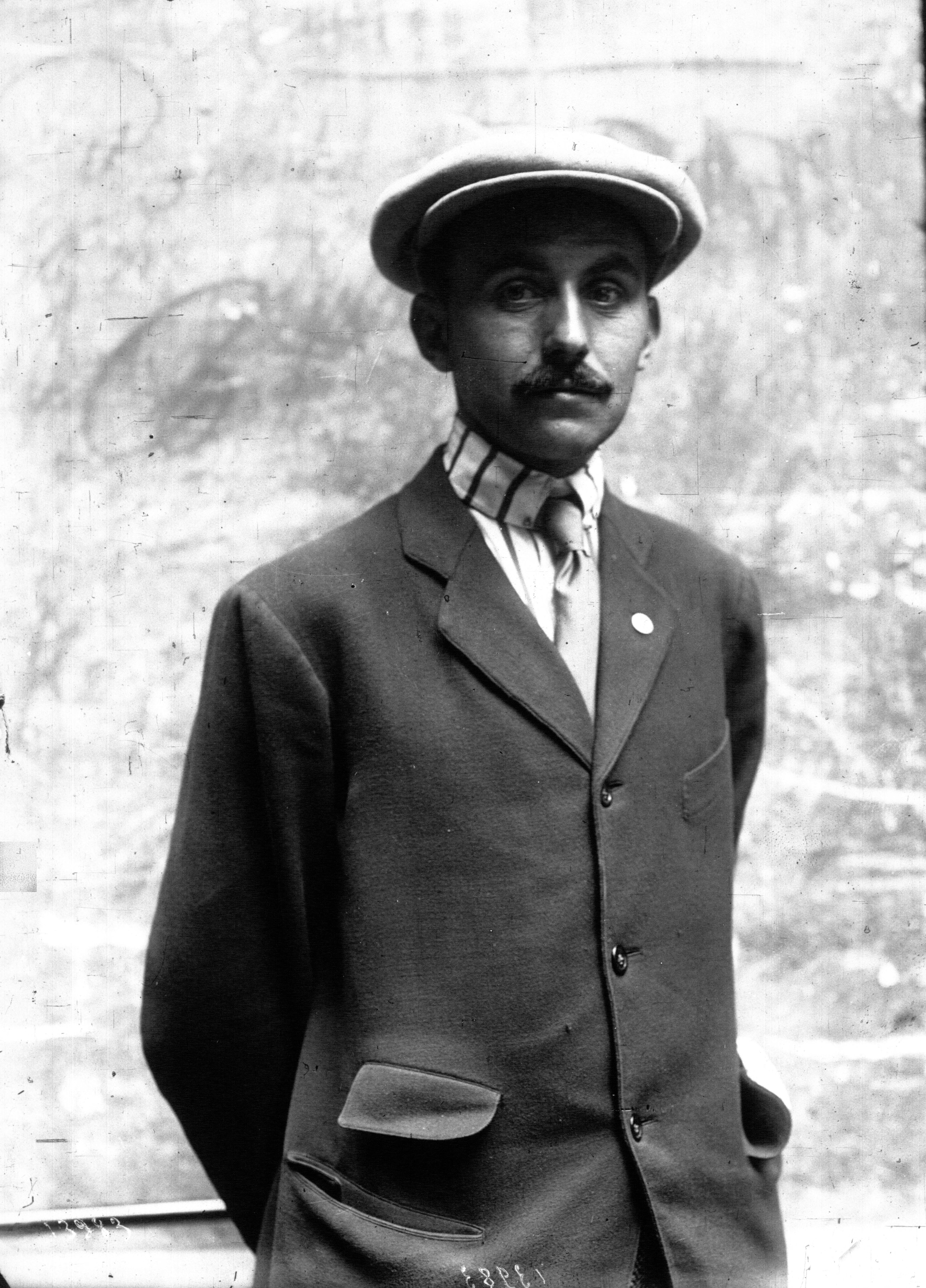
Lucien Petit-Breton, French cyclist (born 1882)

Lucien is a male given name. It is the French form of Luciano or Latin Lucianus, patronymic of Lucius.

== People ==
=== Given name ===
- Lucien, 3rd Prince Murat (1803–1878), French politician and Prince of Pontecorvo
- Lucien, Lord of Monaco (1487–1523)
- Lucien of Beauvais, Christian saint
- Lucien, a band member of Delta-S
- Lucien Bégouin (1908-1998), French politician
- Lucien Bonaparte (1775–1840), brother of Napoleon
- Lucien Bouchard (born 1938), French-Canadian politician
- Lucien Bourjeily, Lebanese writer and director
- Lucien F. Burpee (1855–1924), American soldier, lawyer, and judge
- Lucien Carr (1925–2005), member of the original New York City circle of the Beat Generation
- Lucien Dahdah (1929–2003), Lebanese politician
- Lucien Dähler (born 2001), Swiss footballer
- Lucien Macull Dominic de Silva (1893-1962), Sri Lankan Sinhala member of the Privy Council
- Lucien Ginsburg (1928–1991), birth name of Serge Gainsbourg
- Lucien Greaves (born 1975), social activist and the spokesman and co-founder of The Satanic Temple
- Lucien Jack (born 1988), the real name of British singer Jack Lucien
- Lucien Kassi-Kouadio (1963–2024), an Ivorian footballer
- Lucien Lagrange, a French-born, Chicago-based architect
- Lucien Laurin (1912–2000), race horse trainer of Secretariat
- Lucien Laviscount (born 1992), a British actor famed for his roles in Scream Queens and Coronation Street
- Lucien Littlefield (1895–1960), an American actor in the silent film era (who later also appeared on television)
- Lucien Muller (1934–2026), French footballer and manager
- Lucien Petit-Breton (1882–1917), French cyclist
- Lucien Reeberg (1942–1964), American football player
- Lucien Revolucien, French hip-hop artist
- Lucien Rivard (1914–2002), Canadian criminal known for a sensational prison escape
- Lucien Sarti, French drug trafficker involved with the French Connection
- Lucien Schmikale (born 1997), German basketball player
- Lucien Sciuto (1868–1947), Jewish writer and journalist
- Lucien Smith (1989–2026), American multidisciplinary artist
- Lucien Stanzione (born 1950), American politician
- Lucien Tesnière (1893–1954) French linguist
- Lucien Van Impe (born 1946), cyclist, winner of the 1976 Tour de France
- Lucien Weiler (1951–2026), Luxembourgian politician and jurist
- Lucien Leopold Harrigan known professionally as Jon Lucien (1942–2007), jazz and R&B singer

=== Surname ===
- Devin Lucien (born 1993), American football wide receiver
- Étienne Lucier, né Lussier (1786–1853), French-Canadian fur trader in the Pacific Northwest
- Frédérique Lucien (born 1960), French visual artist
- Jack Lucien (born 1988), British-born Andorran comedian, singer, and songwriter
- Jeremy Lucien (born 2000), American football cornerback
- Jon Lucien (1942–2007), singer from the British Virgin Islands
- Marcel Lucien (1902–1958), French cinematographer
- Théo Lucien (born 2001), French taekwondo practitioner
- Vladimir Lucien (born 1988), writer, critic and actor from St. Lucia

== Fictional characters ==
- Lucien Cramp in Cramp Twins
- Lucien Debray in Dumas' novel The Count of Monte Cristo
- Lucien Chardon in Honoré de Balzac's novel Illusions perdues
- Lucien Lachance in the video game The Elder Scrolls IV: Oblivion
- Lucien Fairfax, the main antagonist in the video game Fable II
- Lucien in The Sandman comic books
- Lucien, recurrent character in Frank Margerin's comics
- Lucien in the movie Amélie
- Lucien in the MMORPG RuneScape
- Lucien Mulholland in Mary Hoffman's Stravaganza series
- Lucien Wilbanks in John Grisham's novels A Time to Kill and The Last Juror
- Dr Lucien Blake in The Doctor Blake Mysteries
- Lucien Lacombe in the movie Lacombe, Lucien
- Lucien in the game Brawlhalla
- Lucien Vanserra in Sarah J. Maas' A Court of Thorns and Roses
- Lucian Connally in Longmire (TV series)
- Lucian, a member of the Sinnoh Elite Four in Pokémon Diamond, Pearl and Platinum
- Luciann Blake in Luciann Blake: The Untold Story
- Lucien Castle in The Originals
- Lucien Antoine Hector Savinien de Ladon, Comte de Graçay in the Horatio Hornblower novels Flying Colours and Lord Hornblower.
- Lucien Xu, a main character in female oriented visual novel phone game Mr Love: Queen's Choice
- Milo Morbius, born Lucien Crown, main antagonist of the 2022 supernatural superhero film Morbius
- Luke Garroway, born Lucian Graymark, character from the Shadowhunters TV show

== Places ==
- Saint-Lucien, Eure-et-Loir, a commune in the Eure-et-Loir department, France
- Saint-Lucien, Seine-Maritime, a commune in the Seine-Maritime department, France
- Saint-Lucien, Quebec, a municipality in Quebec, Canada
- Lucien, Mississippi, an unincorporated community in the United States
- Lucien, Oklahoma, an unincorporated community in the United States

== See also ==
- Lucień, a village in Poland
- Lucien (band), Swedish rock band
- Lucien (restaurant), a French bistro in New York
- Lucian
- Luciano (disambiguation)
- Lucius
- "Luck of Lucien", a song from the 1990 album People's Instinctive Travels and the Paths of Rhythm by A Tribe Called Quest
