= One Way Ticket =

One Way Ticket may refer to:

== Film and television ==
- One Way Ticket (1935 film), an American crime film
- One Way Ticket (1988 film), a Dominican drama film
- One Way Ticket (1997 film), an Australian television drama film
- One Way Ticket (2008 film), an Indian Malayalam-language film
- One Way Ticket (2016 film), an Indian Marathi-language mystery film
- "One Way Ticket" (Miami Vice), a 1986 TV episode
- "One Way Ticket" (Most Dangerous Game), a 2023 TV episode

== Music ==
=== Albums ===
- One Way Ticket (album), by Luciano, or the title song, 1994

=== Songs ===
- "One Way Ticket" (The Darkness song), 2005
- "One Way Ticket" (Neil Sedaka song), 1959, covered by Eruption (1979)
- "One Way Ticket" (Stephen Lawrence song), first recorded by Gloria Loring, 1967, covered by Helen Reddy (1968), Chris Rayburn (1968) and Cass Elliott (1970)
- "One Way Ticket (Because I Can)", by LeAnn Rimes, 1996
- "One Way Ticket", by Aretha Franklin from Spirit in the Dark, 1970
- "One Way Ticket", by One Ok Rock from Ambitions, 2017
- "One Way Ticket", by Rancid from Tomorrow Never Comes, 2023
