= St. Lucy's Church =

St. Lucy's Church or Church of St. Lucy may refer to:

== Croatia ==
- Church of St. Lucy, Jurandvor, on the island of Krk in Croatia

== Malta ==
- St Nicholas & St Lucy's Chapel, Buskett
- St Lucy's Chapel, Għaxaq
- Church of St Lucy, Valletta
- St Lucy's Church, Gozo

== Sri Lanka ==
- St. Lucia's Cathedral, Colombo

== United States ==
- St. Lucy's Church (Newark, New Jersey)
- St. Lucy's Church (Bronx, New York)
- St. Lucy's Church (Manhattan)
- Saint Lucy Parish, Campbell, California

== See also ==
- Saint Lucy
- Santa Lucia (disambiguation)
