= Great Controversy =

Great Controversy may refer to:

- The Great Controversy (book), a book by Ellen G. White
  - The Great Controversy Theme in Seventh-Day-Adventist theology
- Great Controversy (album), an album by Luciano

== See also ==
- The Great Devonian Controversy
- Great rites controversy
- Great Stirrup Controversy
