= Jah Words =

Studio album by Luciano
- Released: April 26, 2005
- Genre: Reggae
- Label: RAS Records

Luciano chronology
Serious Times (2004)	Jah Words (2005)	Child of a King (2006)

Jah Words is a reggae studio album by Jamaican artist Luciano released on April 26, 2005.

== CD information ==
- Format: Compact Disc (06076899422)
- Engineer: Adrian Irving; Kent Bryan
- Stereo: Stereo
- Pieces in Set: 1
- Catalog #: 89942
- Desc: Performer

== Track listing ==
1. Are You With Me
2. Many Things
3. Knockin' On Heaven's Door
4. Angel Heart
5. Never Giving In
6. Foot Soljah
7. Jah Words
8. Feed The World
9. Why Should I
10. Perfect Love
11. Prophecy
12. Cry For Justice
13. Look Deep Within
14. Angel
15. In God Or Man
