= Messenger (Luciano album) =

Studio album by Luciano
- Released: 1996
- Genre: Reggae
- Label: Xterminator; Island Jamaica
- Producer: Philip "Fatis" Burrell

Luciano chronology
Where There Is Life (1995)	Messenger (1996)	Reggae Max (1997)

Messenger is an album by the Jamaican musician Luciano, released in 1996. It reached the top 10 on Billboard's Top Reggae Albums chart. Luciano supported the album with a North American tour.

== Production ==
The album was produced by Philip "Fatis" Burrell. Dean Fraser and Sly Dunbar contributed to Messenger. Many of the songs are about the greatness of Jah; others convey uplifting messages. Luciano considered the album to be a slight pushback against the dancehall style of reggae.

== Critical reception ==
Professional ratings
Review scores
Source	Rating
AllMusic	4.5/5 stars
Contra Costa Times	3/5 stars
The Encyclopedia of Popular Music	3/5 stars
The Guardian	4/5 stars
MusicHound World: The Essential Album Guide	4.5/5 stars
The Province	3/5 stars
The Republican	2.5/5 stars
The Sydney Morning Herald	3/5 stars
The Tampa Tribune	2.5/4 stars

The Guardian deemed Messenger "an album replete with haunting songs, intelligently arranged, particularly 'Life', 'Guess What's Happening' and the title track." The Independent thought that "Burrell's production this time offers a too strangely synthetic space for Luciano's voice to inhabit." The St. Louis Post-Dispatch opined that "a lot about Messenger is nondescript or cliched," writing that "since the rhythms are solid, but generally unobtrusive ... the singer and his messages are left to seize the day."

The Sydney Morning Herald called the album "slick, solidly constructed and immaculately produced, clearly intended to cross over to mainstream listeners." The Philadelphia Tribune labeled it "another melodic and lyrically potent musical mix that focuses on culturally conscious reggae and draws on [Luciano's] deeply religious Rastafarian roots and social commitments." Nashville Scene listed Messenger among the top 10 "unclassifiable" albums of 1997.

AllMusic wrote that "Messenger trips the light fantastic, gliding across genres, sliding across styles, shifting elegantly amidst the record's many moods, creating a mature album that remains one of Luciano's best."

== Track listing ==
No.	Title	Length
1.	"Messenger"
2.	"Life"
3.	"Mama"
4.	"Over the Hills"
5.	"Never Give Up My Pride"
6.	"Rainy Days"
7.	"Friend in Need"
8.	"How Can You"
9.	"Feel Like Moving"
10.	"Carry Jah Load"
11.	"Guess What's Happening"
