= Lusia =

Lusia may refer to:

== People ==
- Lusia gens, minor family in ancient Rome
- Lusia Harris (1955–2022), American basketball player
- Lusia Strus (born 1969), American writer and actress

== Other uses ==
- Lusia (Attica), Greece
- Lusia, Veneto, Italy
- Lusia, also known as adrapsa, a genus of moths of the family Erebidae

== See also ==
- Lucia (disambiguation)
- Luzia (disambiguation)
