= Lotería Santa Lucía =

One of the largest lotteries in Guatemala

The Loteria Santa Lucia (Santa Lucia Lottery) is one of the largest lotteries in Guatemala, which many people support and play to help the deafblind across the country. The payout of the Santa Lucia lottery is determined by the proportion of deafblind people who were born in Guatemala, against the proportion of people with other problems. According to Guatemalan studies, over 50 million people, over 50 years, have helped the deafblind.
