= Luzia =

Luzia may refer to:

== People ==
- Luzia Bezerra (born 1968), Angolan handball player
- Luzia Ebnöther (born 1971), Swiss curler
- Luzia Hartsuyker-Curjel (1926–2011), Dutch architect
- Luzia Premoli (born 1955), Brazilian nun
- Luzia Simão (born 1992), Angolan basketball player
- Luzia Inglês Van-Dúnem (born 1948), Angolan politician
- Luzia von Wyl (born 1985), Swiss jazz pianist and composer
- Luzia Zberg (born 1970), Swiss cyclist

== Other uses ==
- Luzia Woman, the skeletal remains of a prehistoric woman found in a cave in Brazil
- Luzia (Cirque du Soleil), a circus show by Cirque du Soleil
- Luzia (album)
- Luzia, a supporter of the 19th-century Liberal Party of Brazil

== See also ==
- Santa Luzia (disambiguation)
- Lutzia
- Lusia (disambiguation)
- Lucia (disambiguation)
- Lucy (disambiguation)
