= Lucian (disambiguation) =

Lucian (c. 125 – after 180) was a Roman rhetorician and satirist.

Lucian or Saint Lucian may also refer to:

== People known as Saint Lucian ==
- Lucian of Antioch (c. 240–312), Christian theologian, martyr and saint
- Lucian of Beauvais (died c. 290), Christian martyr and saint
- Lucian of Chester (fl. 1195), Christian monk, author of De laude Cestrie
- Saint Lucian, a demonym for the people of the island nation of Saint Lucia
- Saint Lucian British, British people descended from the island nation of Saint Lucia

=== People with the given name ===
- Lucian Blaga (1895–1961), Romanian philosopher and poet
- Lucian Boz (1908–2003), Romanian literary critic
- Lucian Bute (born 1980), Romanian-Canadian boxer
- Lucian Freud (1922–2011), German-born British painter
- Lucian Georgevici (1875–1940), Romanian politician
- Lucian Mureșan (1931–2025), Romanian Archbishop and a cardinal of the Catholic Church
- Lucian Pintilie (1933–2018), Romanian theatre, film, and opera director, and screenwriter
- Lucian "Lin" Wood (born 1952), American attorney, political commentator, and conspiracy theorist

== Characters ==
- Lucian (The 39 Clues)
- Lucian (Underworld)
- Lucian Connally, a character on the Longmire television series
- Dark Swordsman Lucian, a character in the Lunar Knights video game

== Places ==
- Fort San Lucian, Malta

== Other uses ==
- Lucian (crater), a lunar impact crater
- Saint Lucian, an adjective for things associated with Saint Lucia

== See also ==
- Luchian
- Lucia (disambiguation)
- Luciana (disambiguation)
- Luciano (disambiguation)
- Lucien
- Lucius (disambiguation)
- Lucy (disambiguation)
- Santa Lucia (disambiguation)
