= Where There Is Life =

Studio album by Luciano
- Released: 1995
- Genre: Reggae
- Label: Island (USA)
- Producer: Philip "Fatis" Burrell

Luciano chronology
After All (1995)	Where There Is Life (1995)	Sweep Over My Soul (1999)

Where There Is Life is an album by Luciano.

The album was listed in the 1999 book The Rough Guide: Reggae: 100 Essential CDs.

== Personnel ==
- Engineer: Robert Murphy; Paul Daley
- Guest Artists: Terror Fabulous; Louie Culture; Dean Fraser; Sly Dunbar; Robbie Shakespeare

== Track listing ==
1. It's Me Again Jah
2. Lord Give Me Strength
3. Who Could It Be
4. He Is My Friend
5. Your World And Mine
6. Just Like The Wind
7. He
8. Good God
9. There's No Love In The World
10. Where There Is Life
11. Heaven Help Us All
12. In This Together (with Louie Culture/Terror Fabulous)
