= Serious Times (Luciano album) =

Studio album by Luciano
- Released: June 22, 2004
- Genre: Reggae
- Label: VP Records

Luciano chronology
Visions (2003)	Serious Times (2004)	Jah Words (2005)

Serious Times is a 2004 album by Jamaican singer Luciano. It was received positively.

== CD information ==
- Format: Compact Disc (05464516882)
- Stereo: Stereo
- Pieces in Set: 1
- Catalog #: 1688
- Desc: Performer

== Track listing ==
1. Give Praises
2. Come Down Father
3. World Is Troubled, The
4. Stay Away
5. Just Talk To God
6. Satisfy Yourself
7. Love Will Make It - (featuring Morgan Heritage)
8. Echoes Of My Mind
9. Free Up The Weed
10. Alpha & Omega
11. Serious Times Serious Measures
12. Nowhere To Go To
13. We Need A Miracle
14. This Feeling
15. Jah Is My Keeper
16. Ras She Want, The
17. Only Love

== Critical reception ==
The album was rated four out of five stars by AllMusic.
