= Edward al-Dahdah =

Lebanese journalist, essayist and playwright

Edward al-Dahdah (1898-1945) was a Lebanese journalist, essayist and playwright. The scion of a noble Maronite family, the House of al-Dahdah, he was one of the main figures of modern Lebanese theater during the French Mandate era. He was an ardent proponent of the pan-Syrian and pan-Arab causes. He advocated for the adoption of a simplified form of classical Arabic as a mother tongue for the nascent Lebanese nation, as a compromise between classical Arabic and the Lebanese colloquial dialect.

His first published play, "Mazalim al-Hayat" ("The iniquities of life"), a modern drama about the dilemma between men's justice and Christianity's notion of the divine pardon, received the prize for the best play by the alumni association of the La Sagesse College in 1936, and was published in 1937. It was regularly played at the Lebanese National Theater in the 1940s. His second play, "Qayss bin 'Assem", published the year of his death in 1945, is a historical drama set during the rise of Islam, around the common grounds between Christianity and Islam. He also wrote a number of short novels in the weekly cultural magazine Alf Laylah wa Laylah, published by Karam Melhem Karam (1903-1959).

His political essay "Siyassah La Wujdan" ("Politics, not Sentiment"), published in 1926 in Beirut, caused a stir in the intellectual and political milieus of the French Mandate; it advocated for the creation of a decentralized Lebanese entity with a federal state of Greater Syria, and predicted the collapse of the Lebanese state within fifty years. The Lebanese Civil War of 1975-1990 vindicated the prediction of Edward al-Dahdah almost to the year.
