= A New Day (Luciano album) =

Studio album by Luciano
- Released: April 3, 2001
- Genre: Reggae

Luciano chronology
Live (2000)	A New Day (2001)	Great Controversy (2001)

A New Day, released in 2001, is the fourth album by reggae singer Luciano. On March 23, 2001, issue of The Washington Post, music reviewer Richard Harrington wrote about the album, "There's even a bit of peppy dancehall, but the main approach is uplift, fueled by the rhythm section of Sly & Robbie, the Firehouse Crew and the harmony vocals of the Daffodils."

== CD information ==
- Catalog #: VP1617

== Track listing ==
1. No Night In Zion
2. Oh Father I Love Thee
3. Is there A Place
4. Happy People
5. Road Of Life
6. Nah Give Up
7. God Is My Friend
8. Only A Fool
9. Traveler
10. African Skies
11. A New Day
12. Hardcore
13. Spring Summer
14. God & King
15. Tell Me Why?
16. Save The World (Acoustic Version)
17. Journey
