= Lucia =

Lucia may refer to:

== Arts and culture ==
- Lucía, a 1968 Cuban film by Humberto Solás
- Lucia (film), a 2013 Indian Kannada-language film
  - Enakkul Oruvan (2015 film), its 2015 Tamil-language remake, also known as Lucia
- Lucia & The Best Boys, a Scottish indie rock band formerly known as LUCIA
- "Lucia", a Swedish children's song published in Barnens svenska sångbok

== Places ==
- Lucia, California, a hamlet in Big Sur, California
- La Lucia, a suburb in Umhlanga, KwaZulu-Natal, South Africa
- Mount Lucia (New Zealand), a mountain in New Zealand

== Other uses ==
- Lucia (butterfly), a butterfly genus from the tribe Luciini
- Lucia (moth), a synonym of the moth genus Adrapsa
- Lucia (name), a feminine given name and a surname, including a list of people and fictional characters with the name Lucia or Lucía
- 222 Lucia, an asteroid

== See also ==
- Saint Lucia (disambiguation)
- Santa Lucia (disambiguation)
- Lucian (disambiguation)
- Lusia (disambiguation)
- Lutzia
- Lucilia (disambiguation)
