= Santa Lucía station =

Santa Lucía station may refer to:

- Santa Lucía station (Medellín), a rapid transit station in Colombia
- Santa Lucía metro station (Santiago), a rapid transit station in Chile
- Santa Lucía (Metrorrey), a rapid transit station in Monterrey, Mexico
- Santa Lucía (TransMilenio), a bus rapid transit station in Bogotá, Colombia
- Venezia Santa Lucia railway station, the central railway station in Venice, Italy

== See also ==
- Santa Lucía (disambiguation)
