= Blat, Byblos =

Blat بلاط
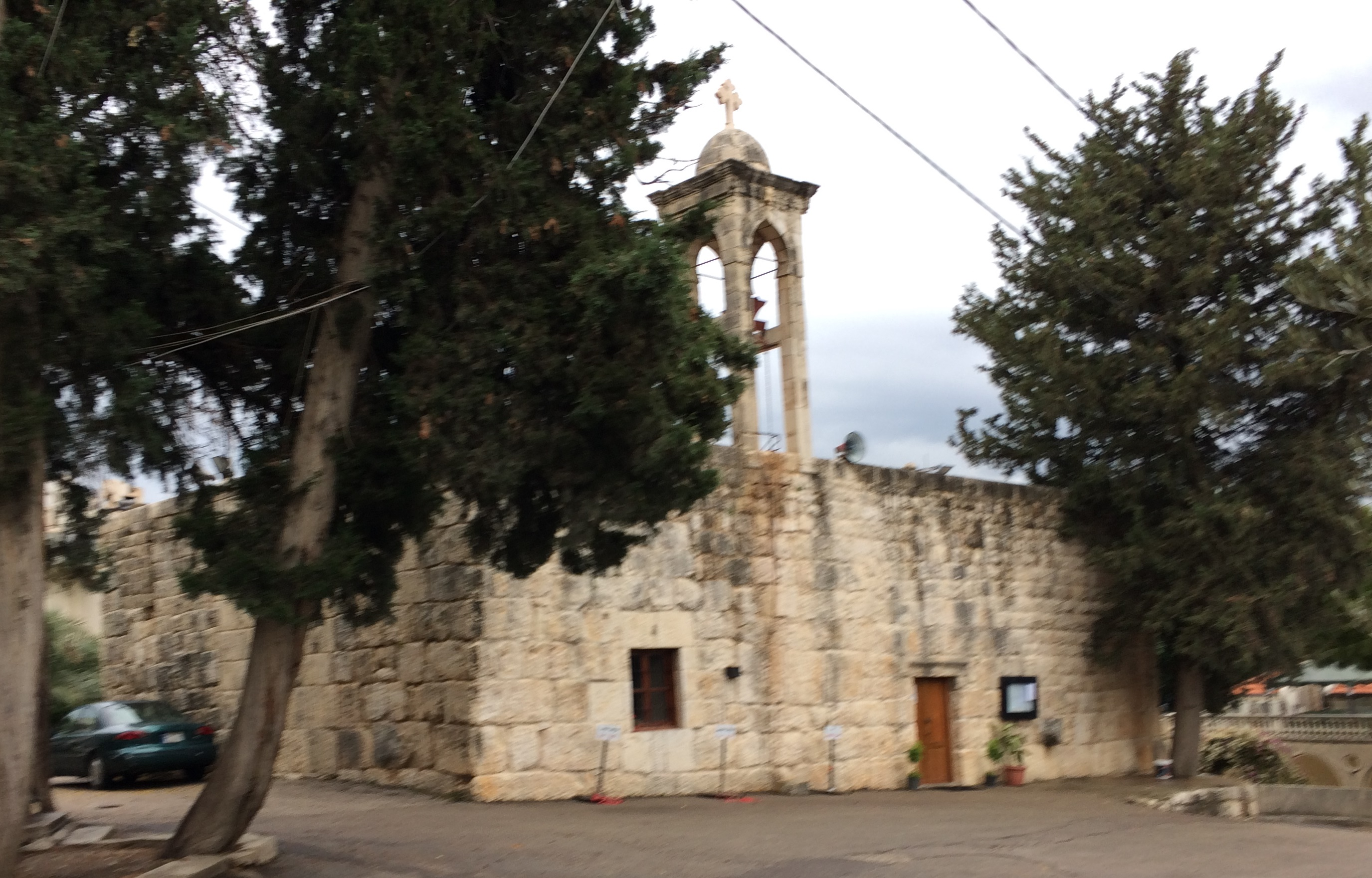
- Built on an ancient Roman temple, the historic church of Mar Elias in Blat is a surviving waqf of the House of al-Dahdah

- Location in Lebanon
- Coordinates: 34°6′48″N 35°39′47″E
- Country: Lebanon
- Governorate: Keserwan-Jbeil
- District: Byblos

Area
  - Total: 6.83 km^{2} (2.64 sq mi)
- Elevation: 190 m (620 ft)

Blat (Arabic: بلاط, romanized: Blāṭ) is a municipality in the Byblos District of Keserwan-Jbeil Governorate, Lebanon. It is a suburb of Byblos and is 40 kilometers north of Beirut. Blat has an average elevation of 190 meters above sea level and a total land area of 683 hectares. Its inhabitants are predominantly Maronite Catholics. As of 2008, there were three private schools in the village enrolling 2,560 students, in addition to a campus of the Lebanese American University. There were 28 companies with more than five employees operating in Blat.
