= God Is Greater than Man =

Studio album by Luciano
- Released: April 17, 2007
- Genre: Reggae
- Label: Cousins

Luciano chronology
Child of a King (2006)	God Is Greater than Man (2007)

God Is Greater than Man is Jamaican reggae singer Luciano's 13th album.

== Track listing ==
1. "Running for My Life"
2. "Bring Back the Vibes"
3. "Kingdom of Jah"
4. "Give Thanks & Praise"
5. "Bad Situation"
6. "Cheer Up"
7. "Borrowed Time"
8. "Strive"
9. "Enough Is Enough"
10. "God Is Greater than Man"
11. "Mankind Cease"
12. "Take Me There"
13. "Bad Situation Remix"
