= Live (Luciano album) =

Live album by Luciano
- Released: October 10, 2000
- Genre: Reggae
- Label: VP Records

Luciano chronology
Sweep Over My Soul (1999)	Live (2000)	A New Day (2001)

Live is a 2000 reggae album by Luciano, the Jamaican second-generation roots reggae artist and poet.

== CD information ==
- Format: Compact Disc (05464516022)
- Stereo: Stereo
- Pieces in Set: 1
- Catalog #: VP1602
- Desc: Performer

== Track listing ==
1. Messenger
2. Never Give Up My Pride
3. Who Could It Be
4. How Can You
5. He Is My Friend
6. Good God
7. Heaven Help Us All
8. What We Need Is Love
9. Your World And Mine
10. Crazy Baldheads
11. Running Away
12. War
13. It's Me Again Jah
14. Lord Give Me Strength
15. In This Together
16. Over The Hills
