= Visions (Luciano album) =

Studio album by Luciano
- Released: October 7, 2003
- Studio: Big Ship Studios
- Genre: Reggae
- Label: Jet Star (USA)
- Producer: Carl McLeod; Ray McLeod

Luciano chronology
Serve Jah (2003)	Visions (2003)	Serious Times (2004)

Visions is a reggae studio album by Jamaican singer Luciano, released on October 7, 2003, through Jet Star Records. It was recorded at Big Ship Studios and produced by Carl McLeod and Ray McLeod. The album is Luciano's tenth studio album, following Serve Jah (2003) and preceding Serious Times (2004). The album contains thirteen tracks, all written and composed by Luciano.

== Track listing ==
All lyrics are written by Luciano; all music is composed by Luciano.

No.	Title	Length
1.	"Gideon War"	3:35
2.	"It's Not Easy"	4:00
3.	"De Ol ah Wise"	3:59
4.	"Divide and Rule"	4:08
5.	"Visions"	3:56
6.	"Serious Time"	3:45
7.	"Israel God"	3:48
8.	"What You Gonna Do"	3:29
9.	"Come Into My World"	3:38
10.	"God & King (remix)"	4:01
11.	"Brother David"	4:00
12.	"Worthy to Be Praised"	4:19
13.	"Until"	3:57
