= Saint Lucy Parish =

Saint Lucy Parish may refer to:

- The Parish of Saint Lucy, Barbados
- Saint Lucy Parish, Campbell, California
