= Aramoun, Keserwan =

Aramoun عرمون
- Municipality
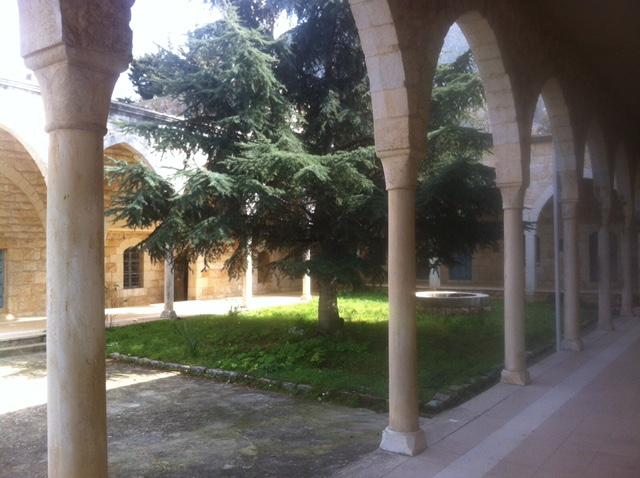
- The Monastery of Saint Nicolas in Aramoun, formerly the house of al-Dahdah

- Location in Lebanon
- Coordinates: 34°1′9″N 35°42′1″E
- Country: Lebanon
- Governorate: Keserwan-Jbeil
- District: Keserwan

Area
  - Total: 1.48 km^{2} (0.57 sq mi)
- Elevation: 730 m (2,400 ft)
- Time zone: UTC+2 (EET)
  - Summer (DST): UTC+3 (EEST)

Aramoun (Arabic: عرمون, romanized: ʿAramūn; also spelled Aaramoun or ′Aramun) is a town and municipality located in the Keserwan District of the Keserwan-Jbeil Governorate of Lebanon. The town is about 28 kilometres (17 mi) north of Beirut. It has an average elevation of 730 meters above sea level and a total land area of 148 hectares. Aramoun's inhabitants are Maronites.

== History ==
In 1838, Eli Smith noted Aramun as a village located in "Aklim el-Kesrawan, Northeast of Beirut; the chief seat of the Maronites".

== Bibliography ==
- Robinson, E.; Smith, E. (1841). Biblical Researches in Palestine, Mount Sinai and Arabia Petraea: A Journal of Travels in the year 1838. Vol. 3. Boston: Crocker & Brewster.
