= Serve Jah =

Studio album by Luciano
- Released: January 14, 2003
- Genre: Reggae
- Label: VP Records
- Producer: Maurice Johnson

Luciano chronology
Great Controversy (2001)	Serve Jah (2003)	Visions (2003)

Serve Jah is the tenth album by Jamaican artist Luciano. It was released in 2003.

== CD information ==
- Format: Compact Disc (05464516572)
- Stereo: Stereo
- Pieces in Set: 1
- Catalog #: 1657
- Desc: Performer

== Track listing ==
1. I Will Survive
2. Serve Jah
3. Win Or Lose
4. Injustice
5. True Love
6. Hail King Selassie – (with Capleton)
7. Nowhere To Hide
8. Born Free
9. Long Story
10. Gideon Bus
11. House Of The Lord
12. I Am Not Sorry
13. Mankind
