= Santa Lucia =

Santa Lucia may refer to:

== Architecture ==
- Abbey of Santa Lucia, a medieval abbey in the comune of Rocca di Cambio, Abruzzo, central Italy
- Monastero di Santa Lucia, Adrano, a former Benedictine monastery in Catania, Italy
- Santa Lucia, Parma, a Baroque-style Roman Catholic church located in Parma, region of Emilia Romagna, Italy
- Santa Lucia, Venice, a church in Venice, northern Italy, demolished in 1861
- Santa Lucia in Selci, an ancient Roman Catholic church in Rome, Italy

== Music and film ==
- Santa Lucia (film), a 1956 West German musical comedy film
- "Santa Lucia" (song), a traditional Neapolitan song
- "Santa Lucia luntana", a Neapolitan song
- "Santa Lucia", a song written by Roque Narvaja, and popularized by Miguel Ríos

== Places ==
=== Argentina ===
- Santa Lucía, Corrientes
- Santa Lucía Department
- Santa Lucía River (Argentina)
- Santa Lucía, Buenos Aires

=== Brazil ===
- Santa Lúcia, Paraná

=== Chile ===
- Santa Lucía Hill, Santiago

=== Colombia ===
- Santa Lucía, Atlántico

=== Cuba ===
- Santa Lucía (Minas de Matahambre)

=== Ecuador ===
- Santa Lucía Canton

=== France ===
- Santa-Lucia-di-Mercurio, a commune in the Haute-Corse department of France on the island of Corsica
- Santa-Lucia-di-Moriani, a commune in the Haute-Corse department of France on the island of Corsica

=== Guatemala ===
- Santa Lucía Cotzumalguapa
- Santa Lucía Milpas Altas
- Santa Lucía La Reforma
- Santa Lucía Utatlán

=== Honduras ===
- Santa Lucía, Francisco Morazán
- Santa Lucía, Intibucá

=== Italy ===
- Santa Lucia (Siniscola), part of the municipality of Siniscola in Sardinia (Italy)
- Santa Lucia or Borgo Santa Lucia, historic waterfront district of Naples
- Santa Lucia, Città di Castello, a frazione of the comune of Città di Castello in the Province of Perugia, Umbria, central Italy
- Santa Lucia (Verona), an ancient paesino next to Verona
- Santa Lucia del Mela, a municipality in the Metropolitan City of Messina in the Italian region Sicily
- Santa Lucia di Piave, a comune in the province of Treviso, Veneto, north-eastern Italy
- Santa Lucia di Serino, a town and comune in the province of Avellino, Campania, southern Italy.

=== Malta ===
- Santa Luċija, a local council in the Southern Region
- Santa Luċija, Gozo, a hamlet in the Gozo Region

=== Mexico ===
- Santa Lucía, Zumpango
  - Santa Lucía Airport
- Santa Lucia (Monterrey), an early Spanish settlement in Monterrey
- Santa Lucía riverwalk, an artificial river in Monterrey
- Santa Lucía del Camino, Oaxaca
- Santa Lucía Miahuatlán, Oaxaca
- Santa Lucía Monteverde, Oaxaca
- Santa Lucía Ocotlán, Oaxaca

=== Nicaragua ===
- Santa Lucía, Boaco

=== Panama ===
- Santa Lucía, Chiriquí

=== Philippines ===
- Santa Lucia, Ilocos Sur
- Santa Lucia Protected Landscape, a protected area in Ilocos Sur

=== Spain ===
- Santa Lucía de Tirajana, Canary Islands

=== United States ===
- Santa Lucia Range, mountains in central California
- Santa Lucia Highlands AVA, California wine region in Monterey County, California
- Santa Lucia Preserve, a private conservation community
- Santa Lucia (Spanish Florida) – Short-lived fort in Spanish Florida

=== Uruguay ===
- Santa Lucía, Uruguay, a city in Canelones Department
- Santa Lucía River
- Santa Lucía del Este, a seaside resort in Canelones Department

=== Venezuela ===
- Santa Lucía, Miranda

== Organisms ==
- Santa Lucia lupine, a plant native to California

== Others ==
- Sta. Lucia Realtors, a basketball team in the Philippines
- Sta. Lucia East Grand Mall, a shopping mall in Cainta, Rizal, Philippines
- Battle of Santa Lucia, a battle of the First Italian War of Independence in 1848
- Saint Lucy, 3rd-century Christian saint also known as Santa Lucia

== See also ==
- Santa Lucía station (disambiguation)
- Lucia (disambiguation)
- Lucian (disambiguation)
- Saint Lucia (disambiguation)
- Saint Lucian (disambiguation)
- Saint Lucie (disambiguation)
- Saint Lucy (disambiguation)
- Santa Luzia (disambiguation)
- St. Lucie (disambiguation)
