= Lusia gens =

The gens Lusia was a minor family at ancient Rome. Members of this gens are mentioned from the end of the second century BC to the second century of the Empire.

== Members ==
- Gaius Lusius, a nephew of Gaius Marius, under whom he served as military tribune during the Cimbric War. He became enamoured of one of his subordinates, by the name of Trebonius, and after several unsuccessful attempts to seduce him, he summoned Trebonius to his tent and attempted force; but Trebonius slew him. Tried for murdering his superior, Trebonius explained what had happened, and was acquitted; Marius himself honoured the young soldier.
- Lucius Lusius Geta, praetorian prefect under the emperor Claudius in AD 48. When the empress Messalina was arrested, Claudius placed his freedman, Narcissus, over the affair, in preference to Lusius, whom he believed too loyal to the empress. Lusius retained his position until 52, when Agrippina the Younger had him replaced, in order to prevent him from protecting Britannicus, Messalina's son.
- Lusius Quietus, originally a Moorish chief, who served in the Roman army with a body of Moorish cavalry. Trajan employed him against the Dacians in AD 101, and during the Parthian War, he took the cities of Edessa and Nisibis, and was then sent against the Jews, whom he subdued. He was appointed governor of Judea, and raised to the consulship in 116 or 117. But after Trajan's death, Hadrian viewed him with suspicion, and he was murdered.

== See also ==
- List of Roman gentes

== Bibliography ==
- Marcus Tullius Cicero, Pro Milone.
- Scholia Bobiensa (Bobbio Scholiast), Pro Milone.
- Valerius Maximus, Factorum ac Dictorum Memorabilium (Memorable Facts and Sayings).
- Publius Cornelius Tacitus, Annales.
- Plutarchus, Lives of the Noble Greeks and Romans.
- Lucius Cassius Dio Cocceianus (Cassius Dio), Roman History.
- Eusebius of Caesarea, Historia Ecclesiastica.
- Aelius Spartianus, "The Life of Hadrian", from the Historia Augusta.
- Ammianus Marcellinus, Res Gestae.
- Themistius, Orationes.
- Dictionary of Greek and Roman Biography and Mythology, William Smith, ed., Little, Brown and Company, Boston (1849).
- T. Robert S. Broughton, The Magistrates of the Roman Republic, American Philological Association (1952).
