= Great Controversy (album) =

Studio album by Luciano
- Released: February 27, 2001
- Genre: Reggae
- Label: Jet Star (USA)

Luciano chronology
A New Day (2001)	Great Controversy (2001)	Serve Jah (2003)

Professional ratings
Review scores
Source	Rating
Allmusic	3/5 stars

Great Controversy is a studio album by reggae artist Luciano.

== Album information ==
- Format: Compact Disc (64903510112)
- Catalog #: 1011

== Track listing ==
1. Road Block
2. Call On Yahweh
3. Great Controversy
4. Legalise It
5. Are You Ready?
6. Empress Love
7. Why?
8. Patiently
9. Have Faith
10. Rivers Of Babylon
11. Free The World
12. Bandits
13. Good Papa
14. Amen
