= Lucien Bégouin =

French politician

Lucien Bégouin (17 April 1908 in Angoulême – 27 December 1998) was a French politician. He represented the Radical Party in the National Assembly from 1946 to 1958.
