= One Way Ticket (album) =

Studio album by Luciano
- Released: 1994
- Genre: Reggae
- Label: VP Records
- Producer: Philip "Fattis" Burrell

Luciano chronology
One Way Ticket (1994)	After All (1995)

Professional ratings
Review scores
Source	Rating
AllMusic	5/5 stars

One Way Ticket is a 1994 album by Luciano.

== CD information ==
- Format: Compact Disc (05464513862)
- Release Date: December 22, 1994
- Original release year: 1995
- Engineer: Paul & Murphy
- Guest Artists: Lady G; Charlie Chaplin; Sly Dunbar; Cocoa Tea
- Stereo: Stereo
- Pieces in Set: 1
- Catalog #: VP1386
- Desc: Performer

== Track listing ==
1. "Black Survivor"
2. "Chant Down Babylon"
3. "One Way Ticket"
4. "Ragamuffin"
5. "Bounty Lover" (with Lady G)
6. "Jah Is Alive" (with Charlie Chaplin)
7. "Nature Boy"
8. "Turn Your Life Around"
9. "Throw Out The Life Line"
10. "Give Thanks"
11. "That's The Way Life Goes"
12. "Some Sweet Day"
13. "Mr. Governor" (with Cocoa Tea)
14. "Jah"
