= Michelle Luciano =

Scottish psychologist

- Education: James Cook University; University of Queensland
- Known for: Behavioral genetics
- Scientific career
- Fields: Psychology
- Workplaces: University of Edinburgh

Michelle Luciano is a Professor (Personal Chair of Behavioural Genetics) at the School of Philosophy, Psychology and Language Sciences at the University of Edinburgh. Her research focuses on the use of twin studies to estimate genetic and environmental contributions to human behavior. She has conducted research on the relationship between Mediterranean diet and brain volume. She was awarded the Visiting Professor Award to visit Trinity College Dublin in June 2019. She was a lead researcher in a study which identified 42 genetic variants associated with dyslexia and that the genetic risk was similar between sexes, this project was in collaboration with researchers from Max Planck Institute for Psycholinguistics, QIMR Berghofer and 23andMe .
