= Luciano (footballer, born 2003) =

Brazilian footballer

Personal information
- Full name: Luciano Silva Santos
- Date of birth: 26 February 2003 (age 23)
- Place of birth: Brazil
- Height: 1.85 m (6 ft 1 in)
- Position: Midfielder

Team information
- Current team: Red Bull Bragantino

Youth career
- 2014–2017: Independente de Rio Verde
- 2018: Goiás
- 2018–2021: Desportivo Brasil
- 2021: → Red Bull Bragantino (loan)
- 2022–2023: Red Bull Bragantino

Senior career*
Years	Team	Apps	(Gls)
2021	Desportivo Brasil	0	(0)
2021	→ Red Bull Brasil (loan)	6	(1)
2021	→ Red Bull Bragantino (loan)	7	(0)
2022–	Red Bull Bragantino	6	(0)
- * Club domestic league appearances and goals as of 00:17, 5 April 2022 (UTC)

Luciano Silva Santos (born 26 February 2003), simply known as Luciano, is a Brazilian footballer who plays as a midfielder for Red Bull Bragantino.

== Club career ==
Luciano represented Independente de Rio Verde, Goiás and Desportivo Brasil before joining Red Bull Bragantino in 2021, initially on loan. He made his senior debut with reserve team Red Bull Brasil on 20 April of that year, in a 0–4 Campeonato Paulista Série A2 away loss against Oeste, and scored his first goal on 9 May in a 1–0 away win over Portuguesa.

Luciano made his first team – and Série A – debut for Braga on 17 October 2021, coming on as a second-half substitute for Emiliano Martínez in a 2–2 away draw against Ceará. The following January, he agreed to a permanent deal until 2026.

== Career statistics ==
As of 4 April 2022.

Club	Season	League			State League		Cup		Continental		Other		Total	
Club	Season	Division	Apps	Goals	Apps	Goals	Apps	Goals	Apps	Goals	Apps	Goals	Apps	Goals
Red Bull Brasil	2021	Paulista A2	—		6	1	—		—		—		6	1
Red Bull Bragantino	2021	Série A	7	0	—		0	0	0	0	—		7	0
Red Bull Bragantino	2022	Série A	0	0	6	0	0	0	0	0	—		6	0
Red Bull Bragantino	Total		7	0	6	0	0	0	0	0	—		13	0
Career total			7	0	12	1	0	0	0	0	0	0	19	1
