= Lucien (restaurant) =

French bistro in New York

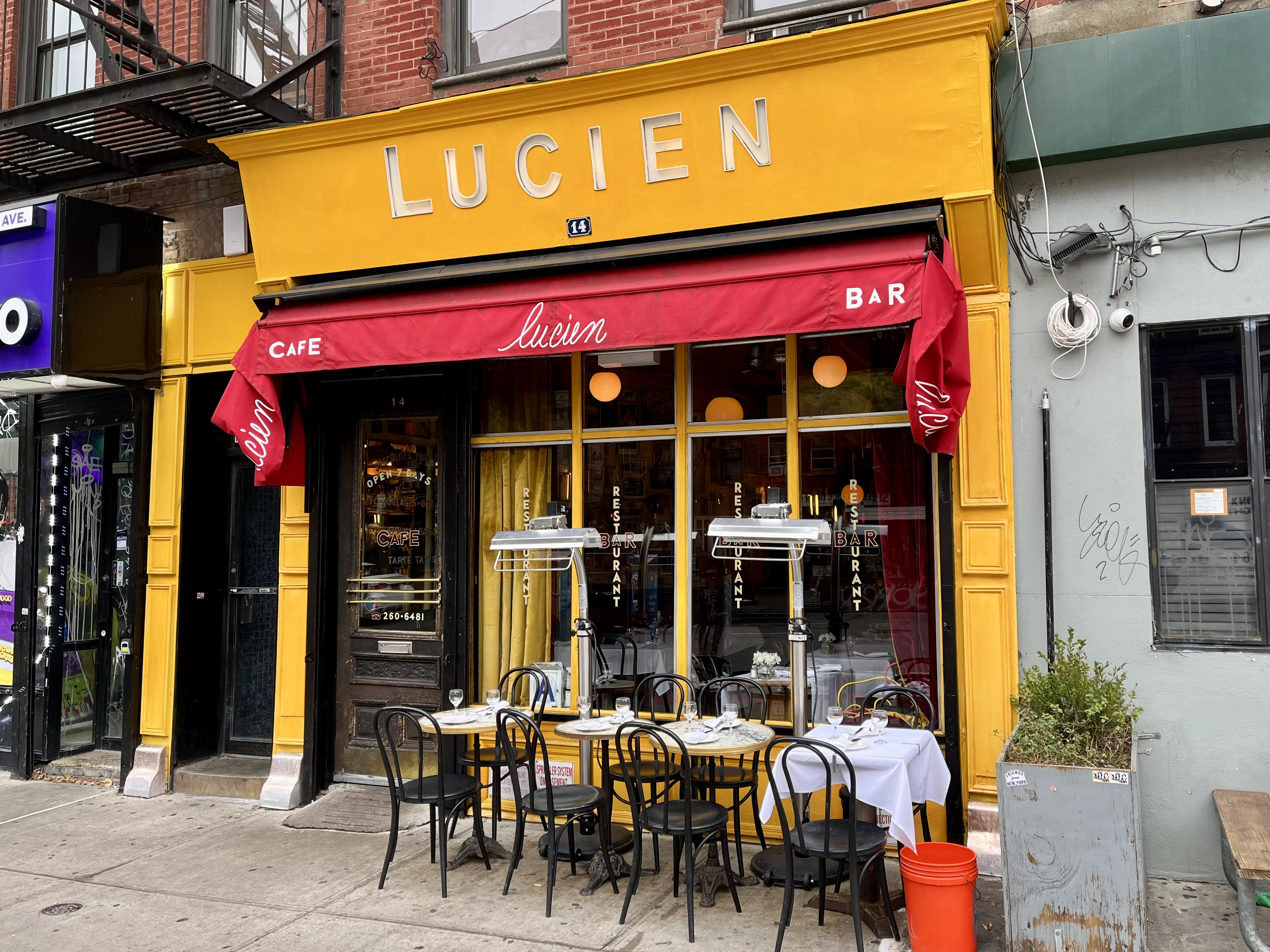
- Lucien in December 2023
- Interactive map of Lucien

Restaurant information
- Established: 1998; 28 years ago
- Food type: French bistro
- Dress code: Casual
- Location: 14 1st Avenue, New York City, New York, 10009, United States
- Coordinates: 40.72337°N 73.98818°W
- Website: Official website

Lucien is a French restaurant located on First Avenue in the East Village neighborhood of Manhattan in New York City. Lucien was opened by Moroccan-born restaurateur Lucien Bahaj in 1998. The menu includes traditional French fare inspired by Bahaj's upbringing in the South of France.

Its clientele have included established celebrities through promotional collaboration with New York publicist Kaitlin Phillips; she has brought celebrities like Bella Hadid and Chloë Sevigny, and New York artists Jonas Mekas and Dash Snow, to the restaurant. High-end fashion photoshoots are sometimes held there, such as for Steve Madden, Ltd. Shoes.

Bahaj died in 2019, and today the restaurant's operations are handled by his son Zac.
