= Mount Lucia (New Zealand) =

Mountain in New Zealand

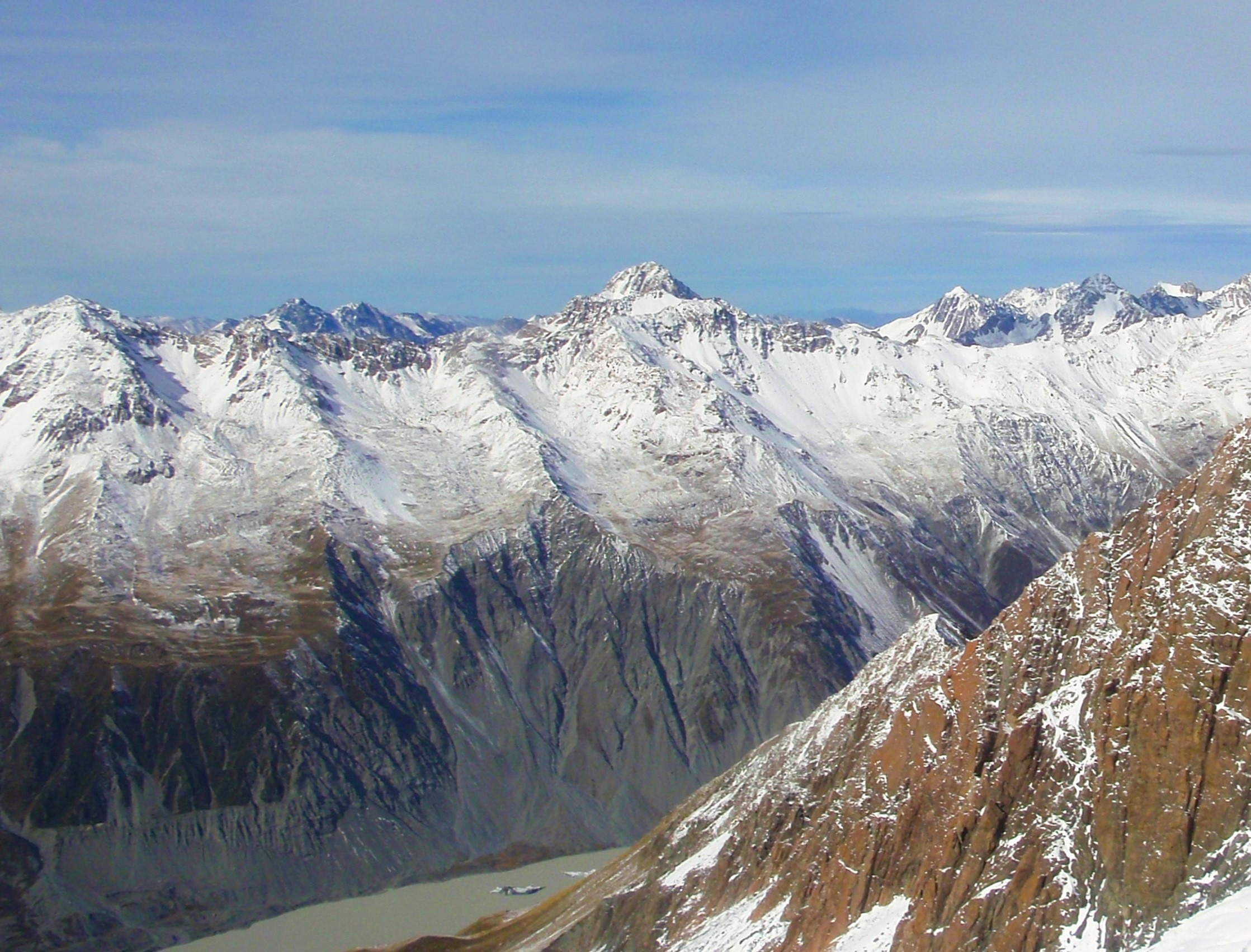
- Mount Lucia centred, north aspect

Highest point
- Elevation: 2,617 m (8,586 ft)
- Prominence: 345 m (1,132 ft)
- Isolation: 4.82 km (3.00 mi)
- Listing: New Zealand #40
- Coordinates: 43°38′44″S 170°21′16″E

Naming
- Etymology: Lucy Mannering

Geography
- Location within New Zealand
- Interactive map of Mount Lucia
- Location: South Island
- Country: New Zealand
- Region: Canterbury
- Parent range: Southern Alps; Liebig Range
- Topo map: NZMS260 I36

Climbing
- First ascent: 1891

Mount Lucia is a 2,617-metre-elevation (8,586-foot) mountain in Canterbury, New Zealand.

== Description ==
Mount Lucia is part of the Liebig Range of the Southern Alps and is situated in the Canterbury Region of the South Island. Precipitation runoff from the mountain's slopes drains into the Cass River. Topographic relief is significant as the summit rises 1,180 metres (3,871 feet) above Ailsa Stream in 1.5 kilometre, and 1,450 metres (4,757 feet) above the Cass River Valley in three kilometres. The nearest higher peak is The Abbot, five kilometres to the southwest. The first ascent of the summit was possibly made in 1891 by Noel Brodrick with survey team.

== Etymology ==
This mountain was named in January 1909 by mountaineer Guy Mannering to honour his first wife, Lucy Mannering (1869–1913). From January through March 1913, Lucy stayed at the Hermitage Hotel, Mount Cook Village, with her family during which time she climbed Mount Sealy and Hochstetter Dome, and she also attempted to climb Aoraki / Mount Cook with her husband. She drowned at Aratiatia Rapids on 19 March 1913 at the end of that long holiday while fishing at the Waikato River, despite her husband's attempts to rescue her.

== Climate ==
Based on the Köppen climate classification, Mount Lucia is located in a marine west coast (Cfb) climate zone, with a subpolar oceanic climate (Cfc) at the summit. Prevailing westerly winds blow moist air from the Tasman Sea onto the mountains, where the air is forced upward by the mountains (orographic lift), causing moisture to drop in the form of rain or snow. The months of December through February offer the most favourable weather for viewing or climbing this peak.

== Climbing ==
Climbing routes with first ascents:

- Via Ailsa Stream – C.S. Brockett, S.J. Harris, N.D. Dench, N. Feierabend – (1953)
- South East Ridge – J.T. Cruse, N.J. Mitchell, W. Nixon – (1956)
- North East Ridge – Nick von Tunzelman, Alex Parton – (1963)

== Gallery ==
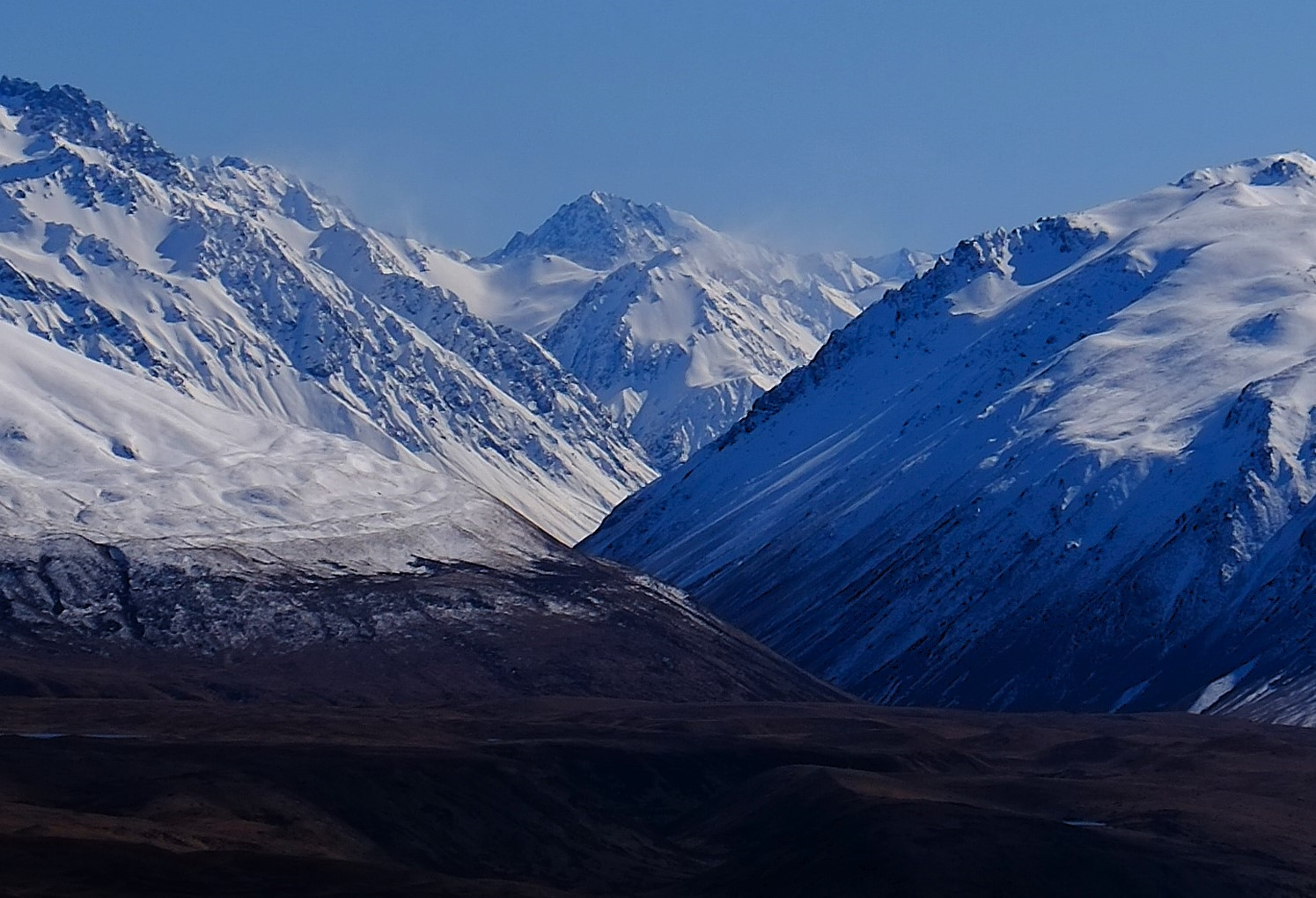
South aspect of Mount Lucia centred, viewed from Mount John University Observatory.

== See also ==
- List of mountains of New Zealand by height
