= House of al-Dahdah =

Maronite Christian family from Lebanon

The al-Dahdah family (also spelled El-Dahdaah, and El-Dahdah، الدحداح) is a noble Maronite Christian family originating from the village of Aqoura in Mount Lebanon, and whose line of descent is attested since the 14th century. It traces back in continuous lineage to Girgis al-Dahdah, the son-in-law of Ghazal al-Qaysi, Muqaddam of Aqoura, who died in 1375 without male issue.

Beginning in 1703, the family received agricultural estates in the Futuh tax-farming district of Mount Lebanon, and in 1705 it settled in the nearby village of Aramoun in the Keserwan District. Its members have collectively held the iqta', or tax-farming concession, for the Futuh district of Mount Lebanon from Ottoman authorities from 1771 until the Ottoman Tanzimat ended the iqta' system in Mount Lebanon in 1859. One branch of the family, that of Mansur al-Dahdah also held the iqta' for the Byblos District for about the same period of time. In the writings of 19th century chroniclers of Mount Lebanon, such as those of Antuniyus Abu Khattar al-'Aynturini (d. 1821), Tannus al-Shidyaq (d. 1859), and Mansur al-Hattuni (d. ca. 1880), the House of al-Dahdah [Aal al-Dahdah in Arabic] is alternatively referred to as the mashayikh (lords) and the muqata'jiyah (iqta' holders or tax farmers) of the Futuh district of Mount Lebanon.

Among its members were several officials at the court of the Mount Lebanon Emirate, Ottoman consuls in trading cities around the Mediterranean, Papal Counts, and notable Lebanese statesmen, literary men, clergy members, military officers, and senior civil servants. It has consisted of five branches since the early 18th century, of which one is now extinct.

== Origins ==
The family claims descent from an eponymous ancestor, Thabit ibn al-Dahdah, a companion of the Prophet Muhammad and a member of the Sahabah, also known as Abu al-Dahdah, whose descendants are believed to have migrated to Damascus in the wake of Arab conquests, then settled in Aqoura, then an administrative dependency of Damascus, before converting to Christianity. These claims were first made in the early decades of the 20th century, during a time of pan-Arab and pan-Syrian ideological effervescence. The 17th- and 18th-century chronicles of Mount Lebanon do not refer to such an ascendance. Rather, early Islamic jurisprudence dictionaries appear to indicate that the Sahabi Thabit ibn al-Dahdah died without male or female issue, prompting an exceptional ruling from the Prophet Muhammad to allocate his properties to the son of Thabit's sister.

A more plausible theory is that the family inherited the rank of nobility through maternal descent from Ghazal al-Qaysi. Ghazal was one of the last Mardaite muqaddams of Mount Lebanon that maintained autonomy under the suzerainty of the Mamluks. Ghazal had no male heirs so his daughter inherited his estate. Thus, subdeacon Girgis al-Dahdah inherited his title through his marriage to Ghazal’s daughter, Jannah al-Akla.

== Aqoura period: from 1375 to 1703 ==
The first proven ancestor of the al-Dahdah family is Girgis (George) al-Dahdah, who was the subdeacon (in Arabic, shidyaq) of the Maronite community of Aqoura in Mount Lebanon in the second half of the 14th century. This Girgis was the son-in-law of the Muqaddam Ghazal of Aqoura, the community's secular leader, who had died in 1375. They both belonged to the Qaysi party. Aqoura, in the hinterland of Byblos, appears to have been a focal point of the Qays-Yaman rivalry that was engulfing Mount Lebanon and other rural parts of Bilad al-Sham in the late Mamluk and early Ottoman times, perhaps due to the concentration of clans of Arab tribal origins in the town, and its location as the terminus of an ancient Arab nomadic migration route that has remained in use until recent years (by the Arabs of al-Luhayb and Laqlouq among others).

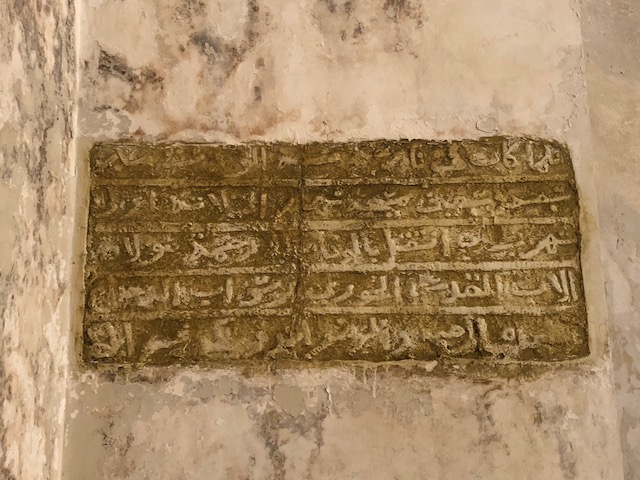
The tombstone of the priest Yusuf al-Dahdah in Saint Georges church in Aqoura (d. 1677)

Following Girgis al-Dahdah, the family's line of descent features at least six successive priests, beginning with his son who became a monk under the name of Mikhail. One of these priests refers to himself as "the priest Hanna son of the priest Ibrahim al-Dahdah" on the margins of a liturgy book dated on from 1572 on the sacrament of marriage for the parish church of Saint Georges of Aqoura, and appears to have copied a similar book in 1560. A paternal cousin of this priest Hanna, Sulayman al-Dahdah is recorded by Patriarch Istifan al-Duwayhi as having copied a liturgy book in Aqoura as early as 1552. Another later al-Dahdah cleric, Ighnatius, is recorded as having overseen the rebuilding of 'Aqura's parish church, named after Saint George in 1730, according to an inscription in the Arabic vernacular language and Garshuni script now located to the left of the western entrance of the 20th century church.

This succession of single children over seven generations has raised many questions about the possible existence of lateral branches of the family which either died out or survived without retaining the al-Dahdah name. Indeed, another one of these priests, Yusuf (1602-1677) mentions the existence of several of his own children ("awladi") among other family members, in a blessing he wrote in 1649 on the margins of a prayer book from a church in Aqoura, where he identified himself as "a priest under the name of Yusuf, servitor of Aqoura, ordained by the [...] Patriarch Yuhanna Makhluf [...], son of the late Mikhail son of the late priest Hanna son of the late priest Ibrahim referred to as ibn al-Dahdah from Aqoura the protected under the care of God in Mount Lebanon the blessed, in the dependency of the country of Baalbeck".

The series of al-Dahdah priests comes to an end with the Shaykh Yusuf al-Dahdah (1675-1762), the grandson of the aforementioned priest Yusuf. Shaykh Yusuf's momentous career is described in detail in Tannus al-Shidyaq's chronicle of the histories of notable families from Mount Lebanon. His existence is otherwise independently confirmed by a colophon he wrote as a youth in Syriac Garshuni script in 1692 on the margins of a liturgy manuscript, now at the French National Library. Yusuf identifies himself in the colophon as the deacon "Yawsep bar Dahdah(o) of the blessed village of 'Aynquro", the Syriac name of Aqoura. Incidentally, the second colophon in the prayer book was written by a "'Imad son of Shi'mun of Aynquro" at the same time. This 'Imad was perhaps 'Imad al-Hashim, a local strongman who drove his rival Shaykh Yusuf al-Dahdah and his family out of Aqoura in 1702.

Father Luwis al-Hachim, in his local history of al-'Aqura (1930), lists numerous properties in Aqoura and its vicinity that still bore the al-Dahdah name long after they had been sold. Among these was the "land of al-Dahdah" in the area of al-'Aqabah, and the "orchard of al-Dahdah" in the locality of 'Ayn al-Lahta, and weekly water usage rights known as "the Mondays of al-Dahdah".

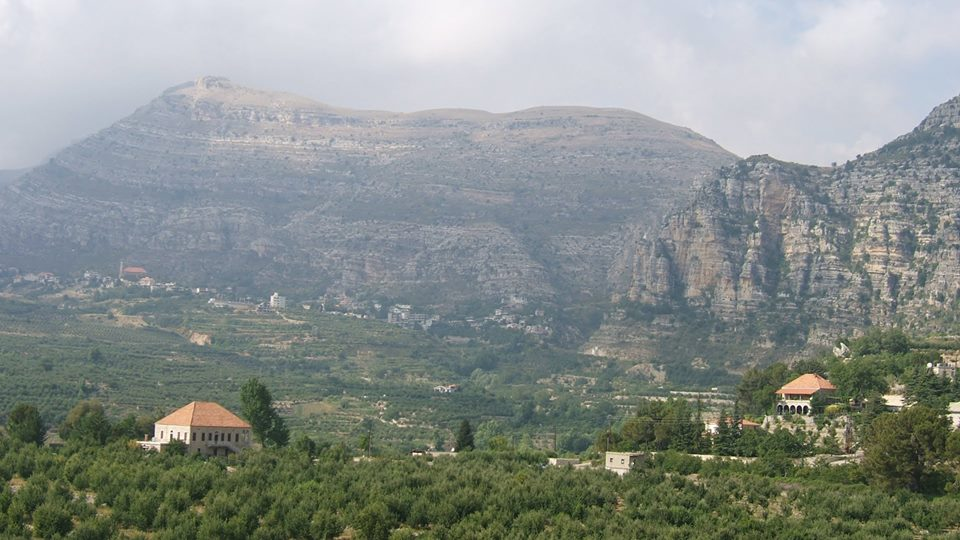
Aqoura, the original abode of the Al-Dahdah Shaykhs in Mount Lebanon

== Futuh period: from 1704 to 1856 ==
Shaykh Yusuf al-Dahdah's exile from Aqoura in 1704 marks the irruption of the family on Mount Lebanon's political scene and the rise of its fortunes first as tax administrators for the Hamadah overlords of Northern Mount Lebanon after 1705, and later as associates of the Shihab emirs of the Mount Lebanon Emirate after 1763, and iqta' holders of the Futuh district after 1771.

Ottoman archives in Istanbul show that the Shiite Hamadah Shaykhs played a much larger role in the history of Mount Lebanon in the 17th century than Lebanese chroniclers have recognized. Their semi-autonomous emirate reached the height of its power in the late seventeenth century, when much of North Mount Lebanon, including the seat of the Maronite patriarchate in the Qadisha Valley, was under their effective control. They had collected taxes and policed the largely Maronite tax farm districts of Byblos, the Futuh, Batroun, Jibbat al-Munaytrah and Jibbat Bsharri of Mount Lebanon on behalf of the Ottoman provincial authorities of the Tripoli Eyalet since the 1630s.

As Ottoman iqta' holders (tax-farmers) with an interest in maximizing tax revenues and hence agricultural output from the districts they had received a fiscal concession for, the Hamada Shaykhs appear to have relied on Shaykh Yusuf al-Dahdah and his sons Mansur and Sulayman after him to administer and develop one of their less populated districts, the Futuh. In 1703, he was granted the agricultural estates of 'Ayn Jwayya, 'Ayn al-Dilbah, 'Ayn Sjaa', 'Ayn al-Gharah and 'Ayn al-Husari in the Futuh district as his private property; in 1704, his servants, properties and cattle and those of his associates were exempted from taxation, and he himself was put in charge of the tax collection and administration of the Futuh district. Indeed, a contemporary reference to him under "Shaykh Yusuf al-Aquri al-Maruni" as collecting Ottoman taxes for areas of the Futuh District on behalf of Shaykh Ismail Hamadah occurs in a biography of Maronite Patriarch and historian Estephan El Douaihy (1630-1704) written by Douhaihy's successor Patriarch Jacob Awad (d. 1733).

Annual Iltizam conventions between the Ottoman authorities and the Hamadah Shaykhs in the archives of the Ottoman Sharia Court in the provincial capital of Tripoli show a systematic inclusion of a financial guarantee (kafala) clause after 1740, perhaps as a result of Hamadah Shaykhs repeatedly defaulting on their tax collection obligations. In almost all cases, the financial guarantors (kafil) were Maronite shaykhs from areas under Hamadah tutelage. In 1762, Mansur al-Dahdah and his brother Sulayman acted as guarantors (kafil) on the iltizam contract of the sons of Ismail Hamadah for the Byblos district, and had to sell their personal properties to pay the Ottoman authorities of Tripoli for the sum of 25,000 Ottoman piasters of tax monies owed by the Hamadah Shaykhs when these defaulted on their payments. Local chronicles report the sale by Mansur al-Dahdah and his brothers of the villages of Fatqa and al-Kfur as well as half of Jabal Moussa in payment for the sums owed as guarantee for the Hamadah iltizam.

In 1761 and 1763 respectively, Mussa al-Dahdah and his brother Mansur entered the service of the Shihab emirs of the Shouf in southern Mount Lebanon, as the power of the Hamadah Shaykhs declined following their bankruptcy and multiple Ottoman military campaigns against them, and all their iltizam concessions in Northern Mount Lebanon were transferred to the Shihab emirs in 1763.

The year 1763 and the following years marked the beginning of a long period of association of the al-Dahdah family with the Shihab emirs of Mount of Lebanon. Through the good offices of Mansur al-Dahdah, Emir Yusuf Shihab had received the annual iltizam of the Northern Mount Lebanon districts, which the Ottoman Pashas of Tripoli had previously awarded to different members of the Hamadah clan, and he put members of the al-Dahdah family in charge of administering and collecting imperial taxes from these districts. In 1763, Shaykh Mansur al-Dahdah was put in charge of administering the people and revenues of the Byblos District, a position which was later passed on to his son Hanna and his grandsons Lwis and Jahjah after that; his brother Shaykh Wuhbah al-Dahdah was put in charge of Jubbat al-Munaytra, the former stronghold of the Hamadah Shaykhs. Shaykh Mansur al-Dahdah also received large estates in the Byblos and the Futuh districts, as compensation for the sale of his properties to guarantee the Hamadah obligations under their iltizam.

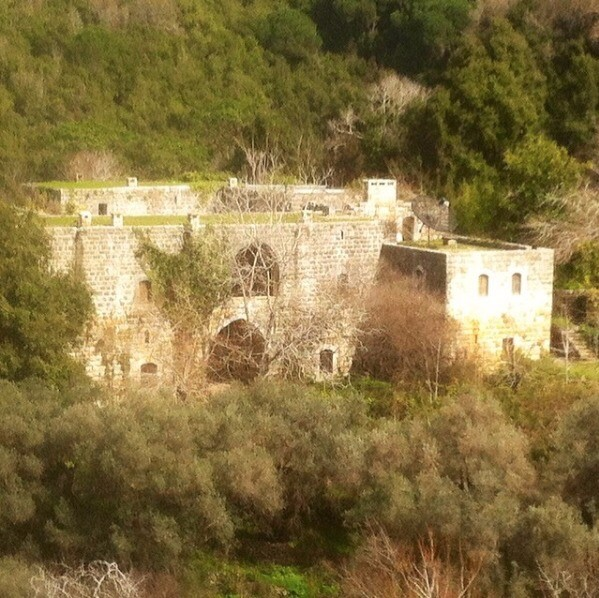
Palace of Shaykh Sallum al-Dahdah in Aramoun, Lebanon

When in 1771 Emir Yusuf Shihab also took over the iltizam for the districts of Southern Mount Lebanon from his uncle emir Mansur Shihab, he appointed several members of the al-Dahdah family to positions of power and influence. Most significantly, the House of al-Dahdah collectively received the hereditary iqta' (tax-farm concession) for the Futuh muqata'ah (tax-farm district). After that date, the family's history becomes intimately intertwined with that of the Shihab emirate of Mount Lebanon under Yusuf Shihab then Bashir Shihab II, with its upheavals and bright spots. Indeed, Emir Bashir Shihab II mainly recruited his advisers among members of the al-Dahdah family. Most prominent among these were Shaykh Sallum al-Dahdah son of Mussa, and Shaykh Mansur al-Dahdah son of Sallum.

== Coat of arms ==
In Lebanon: A cross surrounded by two olive branches, according to family tradition. In France, where the branch of Count Rochaid Dahdah was admitted into French nobility: "d'or, au cèdre arraché de sinople, au chef du meme"

== Branches ==
The five branches of the al-Dahdah evolved from the five sons of Shaykh Yusuf al-Dahdah: Abu Yunis Ibrahim, extinct in 1883; Abu Dhahir Sulayman; Abu Nassif Mussa, Abu Hanna Mansur; and Abu Sarkis Wahbah.

== Place names ==
Several neighborhoods, streets and public buildings in Middle Eastern and French cities were named after members of the family at various points in history.

1) In Beirut, Lebanon, a neighborhood was known as Hayy al-Dahdah or Mahallat al-Dahdah near the old Damascus road just outside the city's old downtown, and appears in maps as late as 1911. The name of the neighborhood is no longer in use, but a street in the same area carries the name of Rochaid El-Dahdah. Another street in the Achrafieh neighborhood of Beirut carries the name of Mansur al-Dahdah.

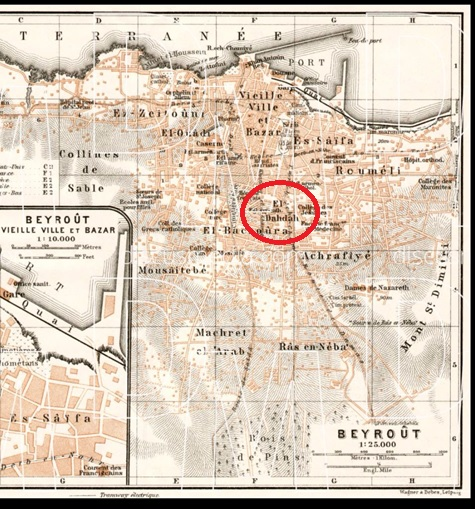
A map of Beirut from 1911 by Wagner and Debes, Leipzig, shows the neighborhood known as Al-Dahdah by the old Damascus Road.

2) In Damascus, Syria a neighborhood just north of the old city is still known as Hayy al-Dahdah (the quarter of al-Dahdah), and was known as Marj al-Dahdah (the field of al-Dahdah) into the early Middle Ages. Marj al-Dahdah is now the site of al-Dahdah cemetery, one of the cities oldest and largest. Both the field and the cemetery are named after the 10th-century Hadith scholar Abu al-Dahdah Ahmad ibn Muhammad ibn Ismail al-Tamimi, who lived and is buried there. Popular lore wrongly attributed the naming of the cemetery to the Sahabi Thabit ibn al-Dahdah, who appears to have died in Medina without issue, and not in Damascus.

3) In Tunis, Tunisia, a public park in the Berges du Lac neighborhood, is named after Count Rochaid al-Dahdah, who was the adviser and personal secretary of the bey of Tunis between 1863 and 1869.

4) In Marseille, France, where Merii Al-Dahdah and Rochaid Al-Dahdah had their commercial headquarters, there remains a Boulevard Dahdah, in the 4th Arrondissement of Marseille and an Ecole Primaire Dahdah, 15 Boulevard Dahdah, Marseille, 13004 both named after Merii.

5) In Dinard, France, the Rochaid square was named after Count Rochaid Al-Dahdah, the town's principal developer in the 19th century.

== Prominent members ==
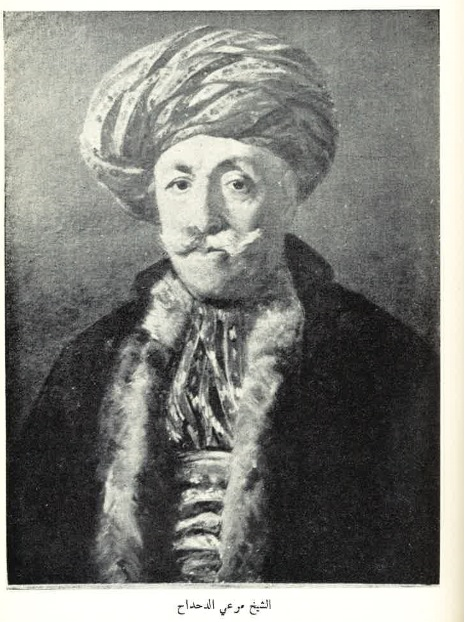
Shaykh Merii Al-Dahdah

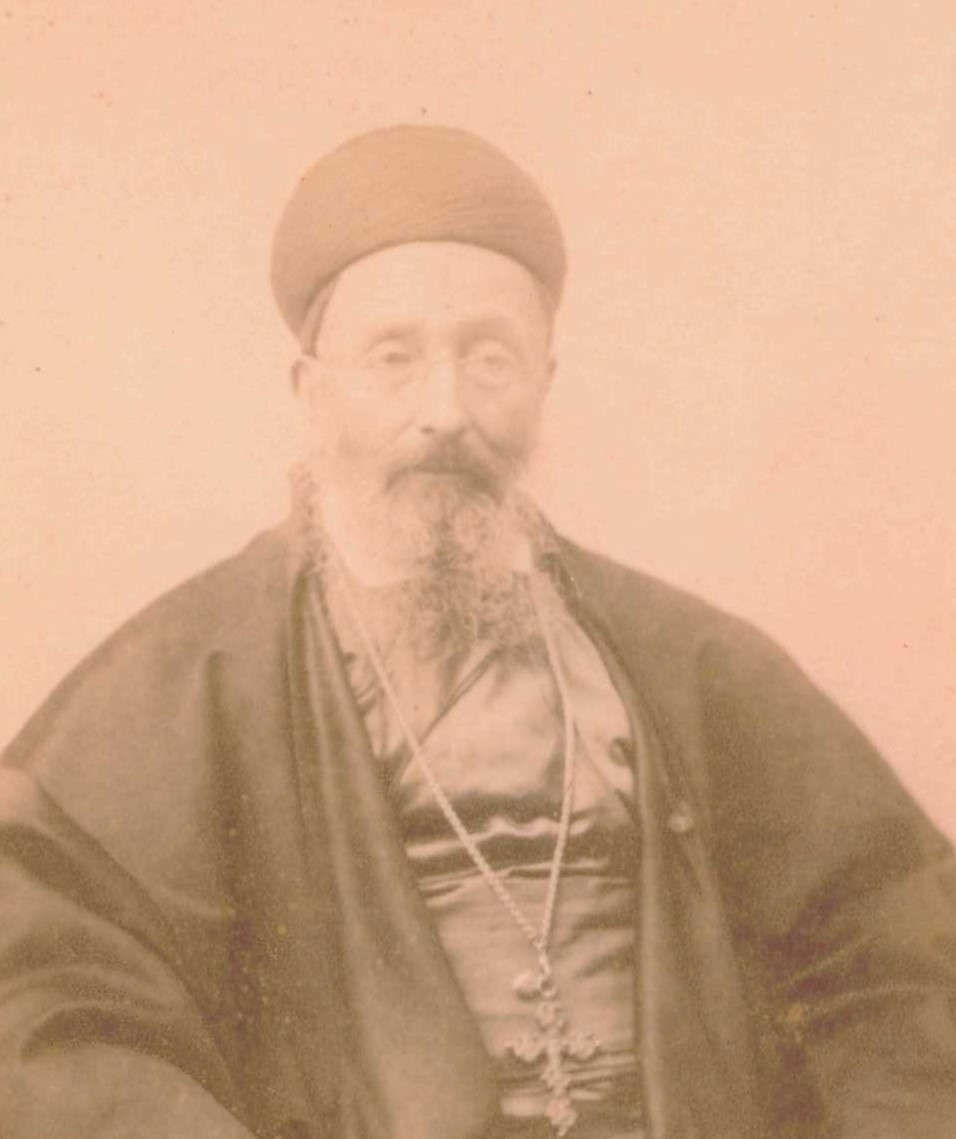
Abbas Al-Dahdah (d. 1890), who became Maronite archbishop of Damascus under the name Nomatalla

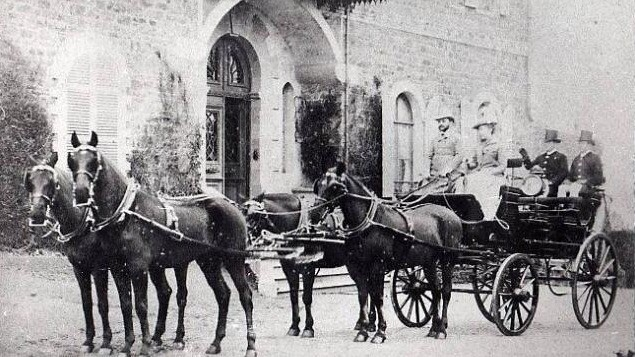
Count Rochaid Al-Dahdah in front of his villa Les Deux-Rives in Dinard, France

- Hanna al-Dahdah (ca. 1560), a priest and copyist from 'Aqura, son of the priest Ibrahim, son of the monk Mikhail, son of Girgis al-Dahdah. Patriarch Istifan al-Duwayhi list him in his history book Tarikh al-Azminah as one of the two copyists of Maronite liturgy books hailing from Aqura in 1552 and 1560. The other priest Duwayhi mentioned was the priest Sulayman al-Dahdah, the son of priest Hanna's paternal uncle. One of the liturgy books the priest Hanna al-Dahdah finished copying in April 1572 was a prayer book intended for the church of Saint Georges of Aqura. That prayer book was still in existence in 1930. He also copied a similar prayer book which he offered to the monastery of Sayyidat al-Habs (Our Lady of the Hermitage) in Aqura in the year 1560.
- Yusuf al-Dahdah (1602-1677), a priest in 'Aqura, son of Mikhail, son of the priest Hanna, and one of the first Maronite historians of Mount Lebanon. His numerous historical annotations on the margins of Maronite liturgy books are only known from excerpts in Father Luwis al-Hashim's book Tarikh al-'Aqura. His chronicles shed light on many otherwise little known events of the history of the Maronite community in Mount Lebanon.
- Yusuf al-Dahdah (1675-1762 d. 1733 in other sources), son of the priest Girgis, son of the priest Yusuf, tax-farmer for the Futuh District for Shaykh Ismail Hamadah, and secretary of Amir Husayn al-Harfush of Baalback. He is buried in an individual chamber in the church of Aramoun, in the Futuh district.
- Ighnatius al-Dahdah, another priest in 'Aqura, brother of Yusuf above, he oversaw the rebuilding of the church of Saint Georges in Aqura in 1725, as referenced in an inscription above one of the churches door.
- Mansur al-Dahdah (d. 1780), son of Yusuf, who arranged for the takeover by Emir Yusuf Shihab of the iltizam of the Hamadah Shaykhs in the eyalet of Tripoli, and who was rewarded with hereditary iqta' for the Byblos district under the Shihab emirs, and large private estates in the Kisrawan, Byblos and Futuh districts.
- Hanna al-Dahdah (1762-1807), son of Mansur, son of Yusuf, iqta' holder with Byblos district, headed a delegation sent by Emir Bashir Shihab II to the Ottoman Grand Vizier (Sadrazam) in 1799 in Anatolia
- Mussa al-Dahdah (d. 1778), son of Yusuf, was an early supporter of emir Mansur Shihab (the Jabal Moussa Biosphere Reserve takes its name after him)
- Nassif al-Dahdah (d. 1815), son of Mussa, head of the budget and tax authorities first under Emir Yusuf Shihab then under Emir Bashir Shihab II.
- Ibrahim al-Dahdah (d. 1834), son of Mussa, head of the judiciary under Emir Bashir Shihab II.
- Musa al-Dahdah (d. 1873), son of Ibrahim, an administrator in the divan of Emir Bashir Shihab II, then the mudabbir of Emir Bashir Ahmad Abillama, the second Christian Kaimakam of Mount Lebanon. He was known as "Lissaan al-Nassara" (the mouthpiece of the Christians) in his time.
- Yusuf al-Dahdah, son of Mussa, the regular envoy of Bashir Shihab II to Ottoman walis, and particularly to Ahmad Pasha al-Jazzar
- Sallum al-Dahdah (d. 1820), son of Mussa, administrator in the divan of emir Yusuf Shihab, later mudabbir (or kikhia) of Bashir Shihab II from 1799 to 1817. He left a detailed eye-witness record of the trip of Bashir Shihab II to Egypt to meet Mohammed Ali, which was published in 1920. From the contemporary account of Mikhail Mishaqah about Shaykh Salloum: "Let us return to Emir Bashir. He ruled the land, and his intendent for the affairs of his subjects and for issuing orders within the land was Shaykh Abu Khattar Sallum al-Dahdah, the grandfather of the metropolitan Nimat Allah al-Dahdah who presently occupies the archepiscopal throne in Damascus. He was the first Shaykh of the Dahdah family to be addressed by the emir as "my dear brother".
- Mansur al-Dahdah (1779-1861), son of Sallum, took over the mudabbir (or kakhia, chief administrator) function for Bashir Shihab II in 1817 when his father retired; he accompanied Emir Bashir Shihab to his second trip to Egypt in 1822, and remained in the function of mudabbir until 1828, when Bashir Shihab gave this responsibility to his son emir Amin; he retired in his palace in Aramun; in 1841, at the bequest of Bashir Shihab III, he led his troops in battle against detachments of the Egyptian army; a contemporary newspaper account of this event, written from Smyrna, and which appeared in Italian on November 19, 1841 in the Gazetta di Firenze mentions Mansur al-Dahdah at the head of 5,000 Christian men at the Dog River (Nahr El Kalb, north of Beirut). When in 1842 the Ottomans deposed Bashir Shihab III and appointed Omar Pashar instead, Mansur become the mudabbir of Omar Pasha for a short while.
- Jahjah al-Dahdah (d. 1840), son of Mansur, son of Sallum, an opponent to Bashir Shihab II and a leader of the resistance against Egyptian troops, defeated emir Majid, Bashir Shihab's grandson in battle in the Bsharri district, and took him prisoner.
- Rochaid Ghalib al-Dahdah (1813-1889), Count Palatine, secretary of Amir Bashir Shihab II, businessman, journalist, editor, poet, entrepreneur, financier and socialite. He began his career as the secretary of Emir Bashir Shihab II and moved to Paris after the latter was deposed. His finance and trading operations straddled Europe and the Mediterranean with branches in Beirut, London, Tunis, Marseille. He developed the beach resort of Dinard, in France, and was a close friend and business associate of Charles Auguste, Duke of Morny, who was French Minister of Interior (1851-1852), Speaker of Parliament (1854-1865) and otherwise half brother of French Emperor Napoleon III. As adviser and creditor of the bey of Tunis, he played a role in the fall of the Regency of Tunis to the French, and was elevated to the hereditary dignity of Count Palatine by Pope Pius IX in 1863, and by the French government in 1867.
- 'Abbas Ghalib al-Dahdah (1818-1890), ordained in Rome under the name Nomatalla in 1845, following studies at the College of the Sacred Congregation for the Propagation of the Faith iN Rome, then Maronite archbishop of Damascus from 1872 till his death in 1890.
- Mer'i Nader al-Dahdah (1782-1868), entrepreneur, and owner of a trading office in Marseille, and adviser of King of France Louis Philippe I on Oriental affairs. He was behind the plan to the resettle the Maronites in French Algeria, following increasing tensions in the mid 1840s between the Maronites and the Druze in Mount Lebanon.
- Nomattalla Ishaq al-Dahdah, editor of the Kingdom of Morocco's first official newspaper, al-Fajr, in Tangiers then Fes.
- Assad al-Dahdah (d. 1921)
- Saj'aan Bashir al-Dahdah (d. 1896), Kaimakam of the Batrun District
- Francis al-Dahdah (d. 1825), administrator of the Byblos District under Emir Bashir Shihab II.
- Lattuf al-Dahdah (d. 1852), administrator of the Futuh District under Emir Bashir Shihab II.
- Iskandar Yusuf Mer'i al-Dahdah (d. 1912), magistrate, Head of appeals court in Greater Lebanon and Syria under the French Mandate, and translator of the Ottoman commercial code to Arabic
- Salim Khattar al-Dahdah, historian of Mount Lebanon.
- Farid Salim Khattar al-Dahdah, Lebanese magistrate, head of the Lebanese Civil Service Council in the 1960s.
- Nagib Salim Khattar al-Dahdah (d. 1984), Lebanese ambassador to the Vatican, Mexico, and Colombia; Secretary General of the Ministry of Foreign Affairs, and editor in the Lebanese newspaper Le Reveil under the pen name of Libanus.
- Edward Salim Milan al-Dahdah (1898-1944), author, journalist and playwright; one of the pioneers of the Lebanese theater scene.

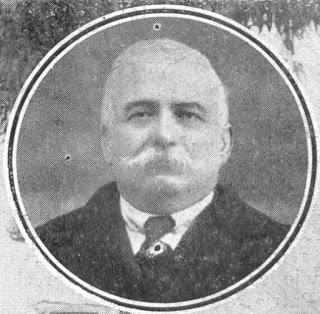
Shaykh Nomattallah Ishaq Al-Dahdah, founder of Morocco's first official newspaper

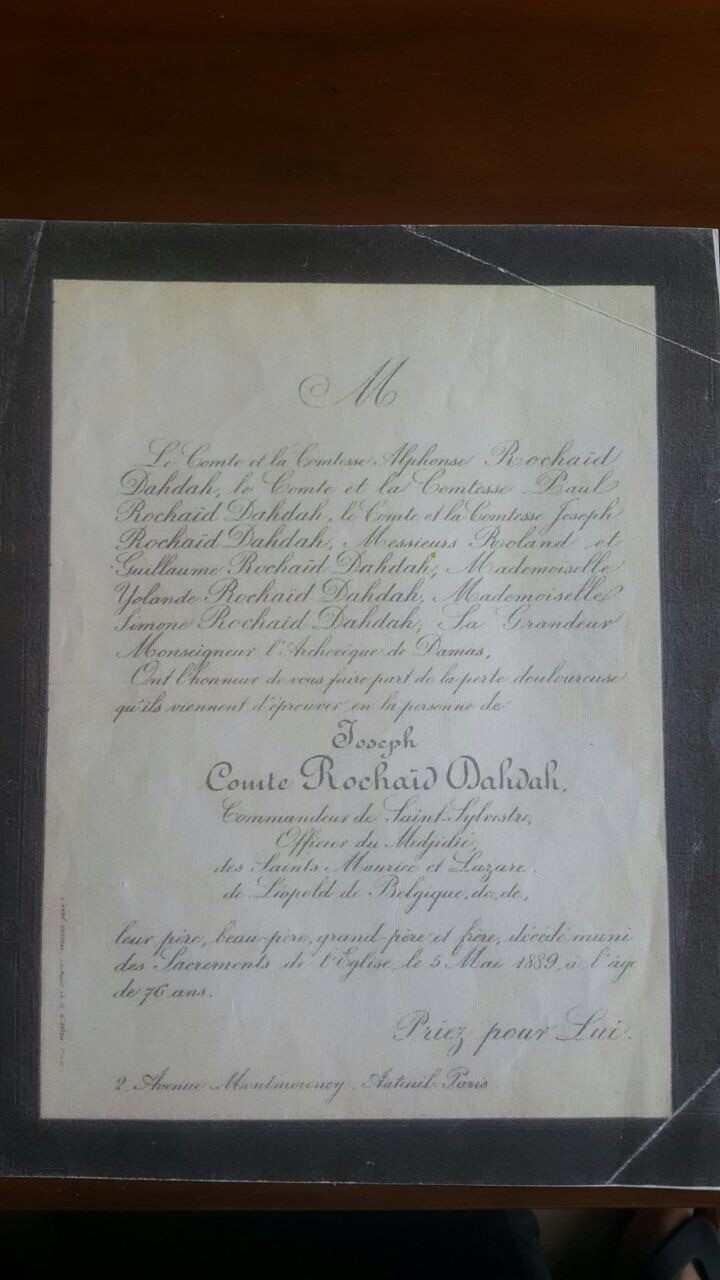
Death Announcement of Count Rochaid Al-Dahdah in 1889

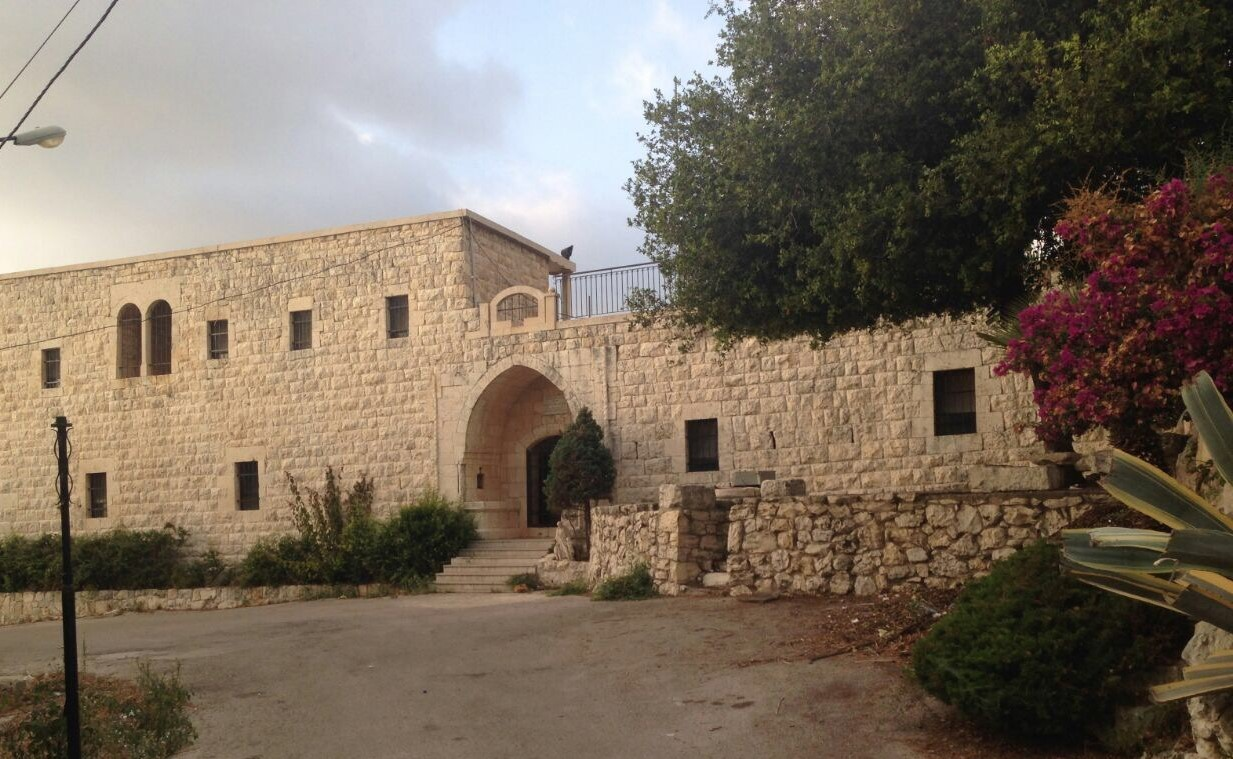
The palace of Shaykh Nassif al-Dahdah in Ghodrass, an Al-Dahdah conditional waqf to the Monastery of Saint Dometius (Dayr Mar Dumit)

== Properties and waqfs ==
In the Futuh District: (Ftouh, Keserwan District)

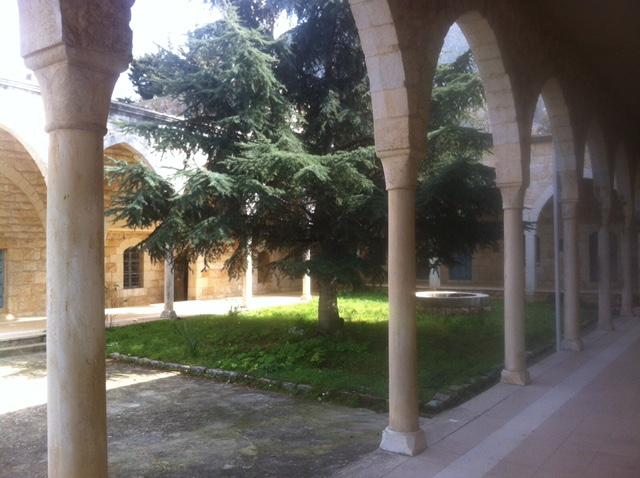
Courtyard of the palace of Mansur al-Dahdah, son of Salloum, now the Monastery of Saint Nicolas in Aramoun, Lebanon.

- the village of 'Ayn Sjaa, a hamlet dependency of the town of Ghbele
- the village of 'Ayn al-Dilbah
- the village of 'Ayn al-Magharah
- the village of 'Ayn al-Husari
- the village of 'Ayn Juwayya
- the palace of Shaykh Mussa al-Dahdah, son of Ibrahim, in the town of Aramoun, now the seat of the Maronite Eparchy of Baalbeck
- the palace of Shaykh Sallum al-Dahdah, son of Mussa outside the town of Aramoun; built in 1814 by the same architect as the Beiteddine Palace of Emir Bashir Shihab II.
- the palace of Shaykh Mansur al-Dahdah, son of Salloum, in the town of Aramoun, now the school of Saint Nicolas (Mar Nqula) and known locally as al-'Arimah.
- the palace of Shaykh Nassif al-Dahdah, son of Mussa, in the town of Ghodrass. The palace became known as the Monastery of Saint Dometius (Mar Doumit) in Ghodrass, a dependency of the Monastery of Saint Dometius in al-Bouar, after Shaykh Nassif turned the palace into a conditional waqf to a Maronite monastic order, along with vast landed estates in surrounding areas. A decision from the second Maronite synod of Luwayzah in 1818 confirmed the temporal custody of the House of al-Dahdah over the all lands and properties attached to the a series waqfs of the monastery of Mar Doumit in al-Bouar, in the areas of Ghodrass, al-Bouar, Safra, Fatqa, and others. A majority of these lands had been entrusted as waqfs by the House of al-Dahdah. The synod decision was confirmation and witnessed by the Maronite monks heading the monastery, who retained spiritual custodianship.
- the palace of Shaykh Merii al-Dahdah, in the town of al-Kfour, now the upscale guesthouse of Beit Trad.
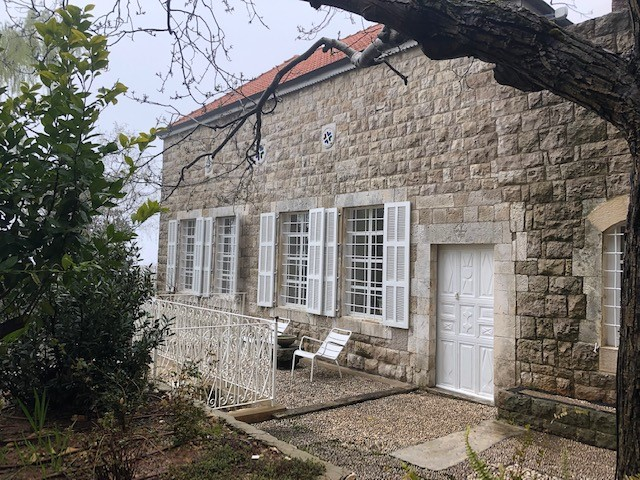
Palace of Shaykh Merii al-Dahdah in Kfour, now a guesthouse
- the Monastery of Saint Anthony of Padua (Mar Antonios al-Badawani) in Ayn Sjaa' al-Ghbele in the Futuh District
- the lands entrusted as waqf to the Monastery of Saint 'Abda (Mar 'Abda) in the village of Harhariya
- the lands in the town of Ghodrass entrusted as waqf to the Monastery of Saint Dometius (Mar Doumit) of al-Bouar

In the Byblos District:

- the Monastery (Deir) of al-Banat and its lands, now our the Monastery of Our Lady of the Succors, near the city of Byblos, entrusted as waqf to the Lebanese Maronite Order by Mansur al-Dahdah in 1770.
- the lands located in Mastita, entrusted as waqf to the Monastery of Our Lady of the Fields (Sayyidat al-Haqlah) of Dlebta
- the house of Shaykh Hanna al-Dahdah, now a restaurant in the old district of Byblos
- the historic church (formerly a Roman temple) of Saint Elijah in the village of Blat and its dependencies, a waqf of the Wahbah branch of the House of al-Dahdah.

In the Batrun District:

- the village of Bassatine al-'Ussa in the Batrun District, to the heirs of Mansur ibn Sallum al-Dahdah
- the lands of the Church of Our Lady of Shwit (Sayyidat Swhit) in the village of Shgar in the Batrun District

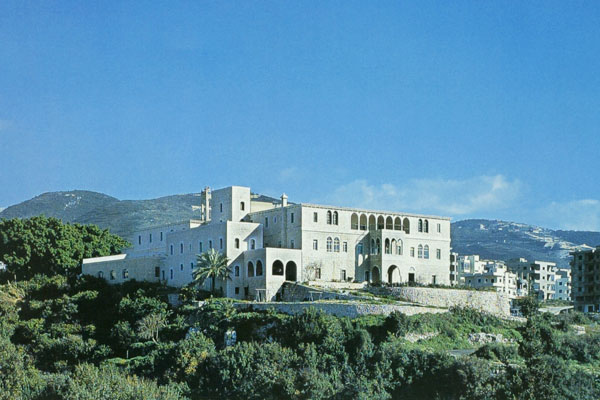
The Monastery of Our Lady of the Succors (Dayr al-Banat) outside the city of Byblos in Lebanon, given to Shaykh Mansur al-Dahdah by Amir Yusuf Shihab in 1770

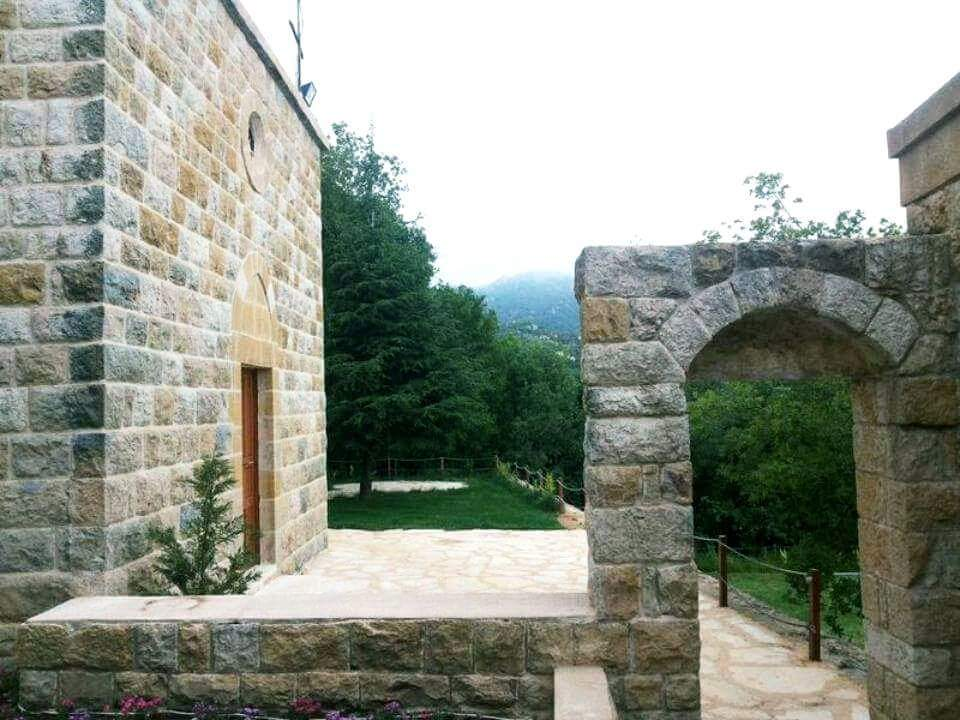
The Monastery of Saint Anthony of Padua in Ayn Sja', Lebanon, one of the waqfs of the House of Al-Dahdah

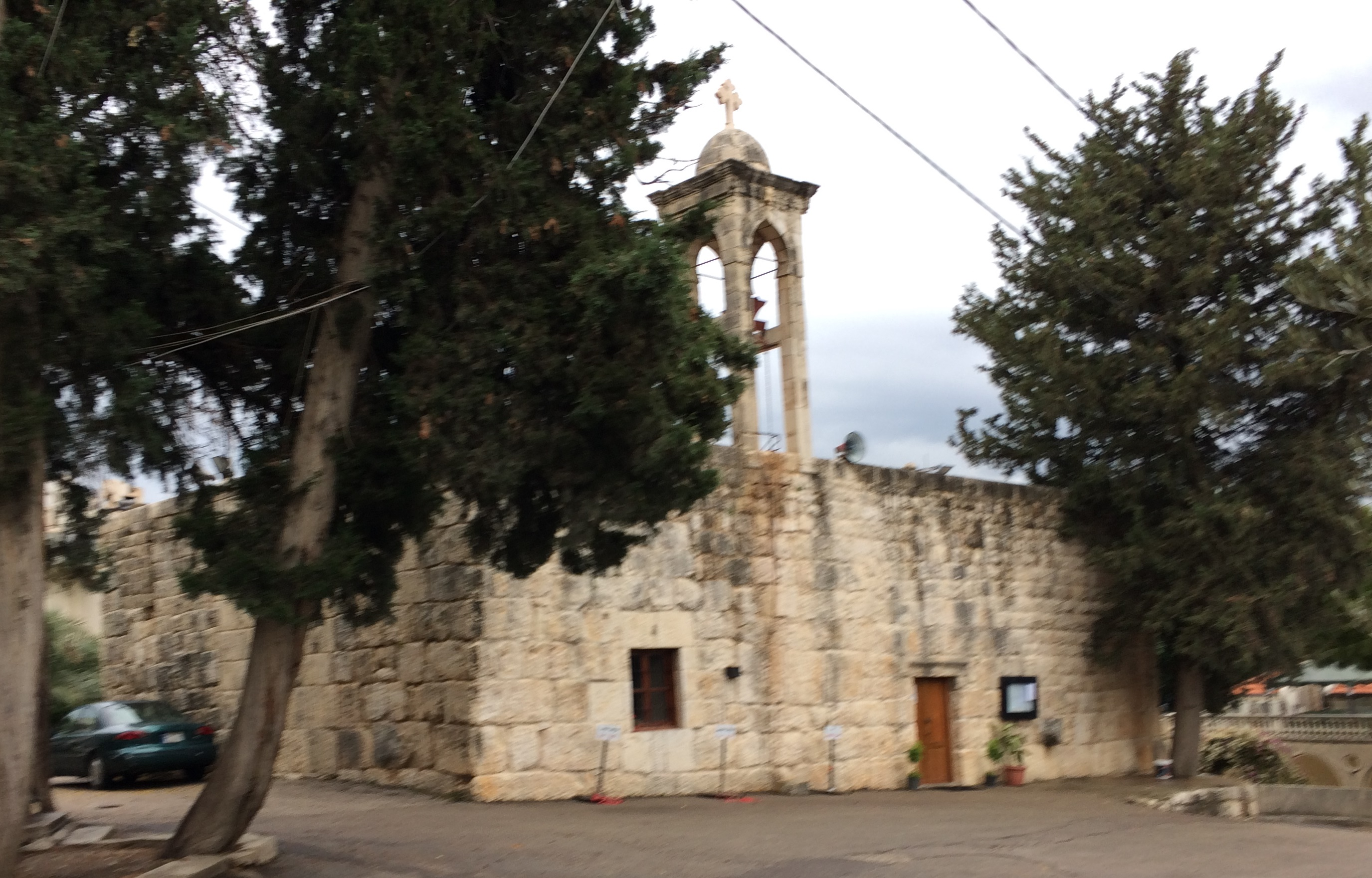
Built on an ancient Roman temple, the historic church of Mar Elias in the village of Blat is a waqf of the House of al-Dahdah

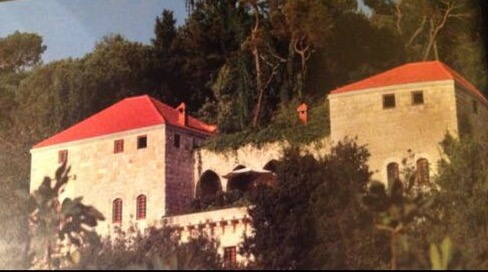
An Al-Dahdah palace in Kfour, Lebanon

== Allied families ==
In addition to its dominant practice of endogamous marriage between members of its different branches, the house of al-Dahdah is mainly allied to the two other families of the Maronite nobility of Kisrawan: the Khazen, and the Hubaysh, and to a lesser extent, to the families of al-Hachem in Aqoura and al-Khouri Salih of Richmayya (currently the two families of al-Saad and al-Khoury of the Richmayya branch). For instance, President Shaykh Bechara al-Khoury, the first president of the Lebanese Republic, was the maternal grandson of a woman from the Dahdah family; the sister of Habib al-Saad, who was president of Lebanon under the French Mandate from 1934 to 1936, was married to Iskandar al-Dahdah.

== See also ==
- List of political families in Lebanon
