= St. Lucie =

St. Lucie may refer to:

- St. Lucie County, Florida, Florida county established in 1905
- St. Lucie County, Florida (1844-1855)
- St. Lucie Inlet, in Florida
- St. Lucie Mets, minor league baseball team in Port St. Lucie, Florida
- St. Lucie Nuclear Power Plant, near Port St. Lucie, Florida
- St. Lucie River, in Florida
- St. Lucie Village, Florida

== See also ==
- Saint Lucy
- Santa Lucia (disambiguation)
