= Lucien Dahdah =

Lebanese academic, businessman and politician (1929–2003)

- Born: Lucien Mounir Dahdah; 15 August 1929
- Died: 16 November 2003 (aged 74)
- Education: American University of Beirut; Sorbonne University; Birmingham University
- Occupations: Academic; Businessman

Lucien Dahdah (Arabic: لوسيان دحداح) (15 August 1929 – 16 November 2003) was a Lebanese academic, businessman, media executive and politician, who served as foreign minister in 1975.

== Early life and education ==
Dahdah was born on 15 August 1929. He was a graduate of American University of Beirut (AUB), Sorbonne University in Paris and Birmingham University. He graduated from AUB in 1949. He received a PhD from Sorbonne and Birmingham universities.

== Career ==
Dahdah worked as a university professor at his alma mater, AUB, teaching statistics and economics. Then he headed the board of directors of Intra Investment from 1970 to 1976 and from 1989 to 1993. He served as foreign minister in the interim cabinet led by Noureddine Rifai in 1975 under President Suleiman Frangieh. Dahdah was also advisor of Frangieh when the latter was serving as the president of Lebanon.

Dahdah was among the founding members of the Tele Orient channel. He also served as the director general of the channel. In addition, he founded the Radio Monte-Carlo-Moyen-Orient. Later he became the director of Middle East Economic Digest.

== Personal life and death ==
Dahdah married twice and had a daughter. He died on 16 November 2003 at the age of 74.
