= Saint Lucy Parish, Campbell, California =

Catholic parish church in the United States

St. Lucy Parish
- St. Lucy Parish
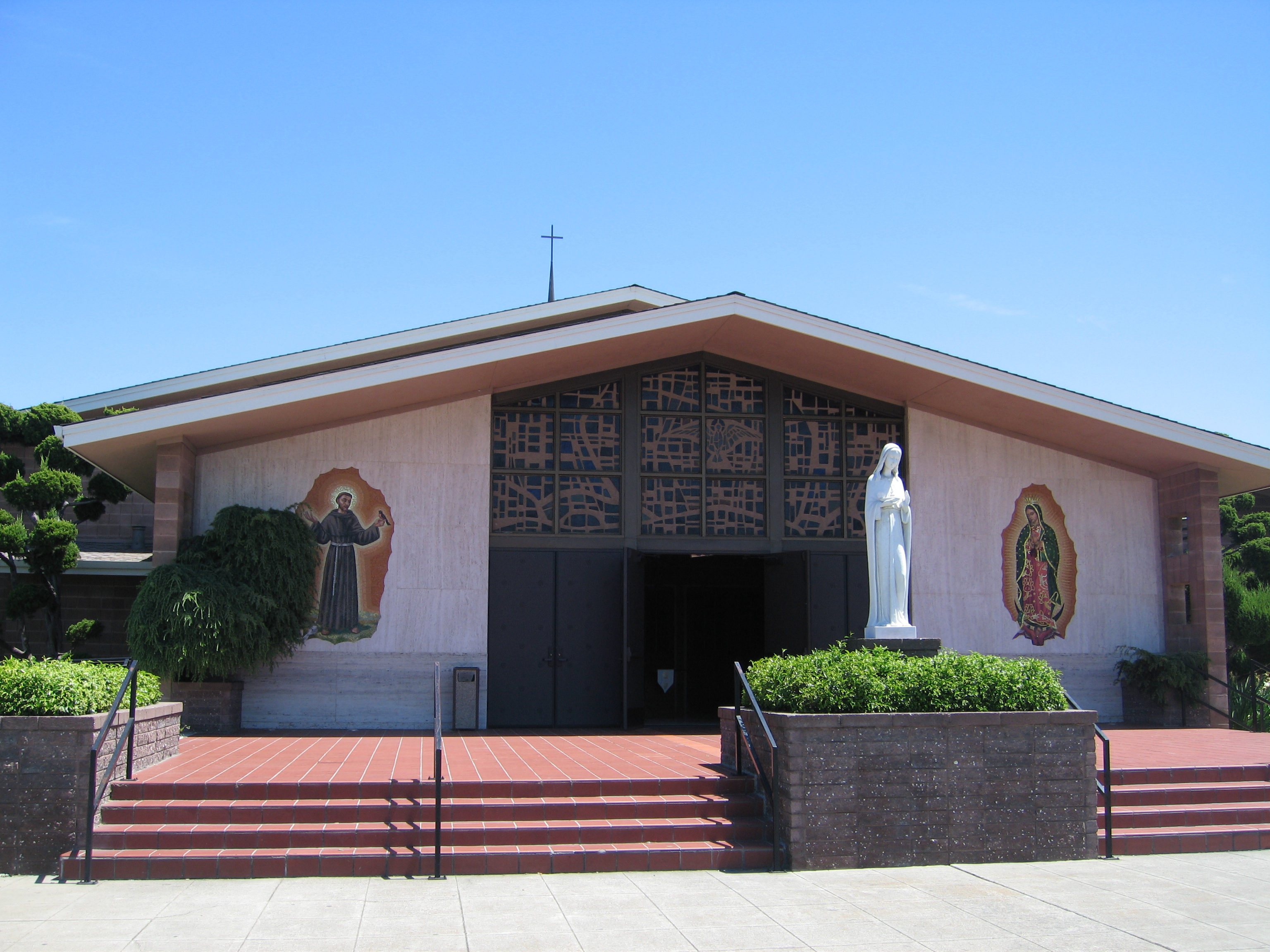
- Front of St. Lucy Parish Church

- Location within California
- 37°16′49″N 121°57′00″W
- Location: 2350 S. Winchester Blvd, Campbell, California
- Country: USA
- Denomination: Roman Catholic
- Website: www.stlucy-campbell.org

History
- Status: Parish church
- Founded: 1914
- Dedication: Saint Lucy
- Dedicated: 1957
- Events: Feast Day of St. Lucy, Martyr (September 16, 1962 rubrics) · (December 13, 1969 rubrics)

Architecture
- Functional status: Active
- Completed: 1957

Administration
- Archdiocese: Archdiocese of San Francisco
- Deanery: Deanery 5

Clergy
- Bishop: The Most Rev. Oscar Cantú
- Vicar: Rev. Andrey Garcia
- Dean: Fr. Greg Kimm (St. Mary of the Immaculate Conception Parish)
- Pastor: Rev. Rick Rodoni

St. Lucy Catholic Parish is a Latin Church parish of the Catholic Church in Campbell, California. The church was originally established as a Mission of Saint Martin Parish of San Jose in 1914. The current church was built in 1957.

== See also ==
- Roman Catholic Diocese of San Jose in California
