= Santa Luzia =

Santa Luzia is Portuguese for Saint Lucy, and may refer to any of the following:

== Places ==
=== Brazil ===
- Santa Luzia, Bahia, a municipality in the State of Bahia
- Santa Luzia, Maranhão, a municipality in the State of Maranhão
- Santa Luzia, Minas Gerais, a municipality in the State of Minas Gerais
- Santa Luzia, Paraíba, a municipality in the State of Paraíba
- Santa Luzia d'Oeste, a municipality in the State of Rondônia
- Santa Luzia do Paruá, a municipality in the State of Maranhão

=== Cape Verde ===
- Santa Luzia, Cape Verde, an uninhabited island of the Barlavento chain

=== Portugal ===
- Santa Luzia, a former civil parish, now part of Garvão e Santa Luzia, in the municipality of Ourique
- Santa Luzia (Tavira), a civil parish in the municipality of Tavira

==== Azores ====
- Santa Luzia (Angra do Heroísmo), a civil parish in the municipality of Angra do Heroísmo, Terceira
- Santa Luzia (São Roque do Pico), a civil parish in the municipality of São Roque do Pico, Pico

==== Madeira ====
- Santa Luzia (Funchal), a civil parish in the municipality of Funchal

== Other uses ==
- Santa Luzia (galleon)

== See also ==
- Luzia (disambiguation)
