= Luciano =

- Pronunciation: Spanish: [luˈθjano], Latin American Spanish: [luˈsjano] Portuguese: [lusiˈɐnu] Italian: [luˈtʃaːno]
- Gender: Male
- Language: Spanish, Portuguese, Italian.

Other names
- Related names: Luciana, Lucian

Luciano is an Italian, Spanish and Portuguese given name and surname. It is derived from Latin Lucianus, patronymic of Lucius ("Light"). The French form is Lucien, the Catalan version is Llucià while the Basque form is Luken.

== Single name ==
- Luciano (rapper) (born 1994), German rapper of Mozambican descent
- Luciano (Jamaican singer) (born 1964), reggae artist from Jamaica
- Luciano (Brazilian singer), (real name Welson David de Camargo), part of the Brazilian duo Zezé Di Camargo & Luciano
- Luciano (DJ), (real name Lucien Nicolet), electronic music DJ and producer
- Le Rat Luciano, French rapper, part of the French rap group Fonky Family
- Luciano (footballer, born 1965)
- Luciano (footballer, born 1978)
- Luciano (footballer, born 1993)
- Luciano (footballer, born 2003)

== Given name ==
- Luciano Armani (1940–2023), Italian cyclist
- Luciano Barbosa (born 1976), Brazilian squash player
- Luciano Becchio, Argentine footballer
- Luciano Benetton (born 1935), Italian billionaire businessman
- Luciano Berio (1925–2003), Italian composer
- Luciano Canepari, Italian phonetician
- Luciano Castro (born 1975), Argentine actor
- Luciano D'Alessandro (born 1977), Venezuelan-Colombian actor and model
- Luciano Erba (1922–2010), Italian poet
- Luciano Federico (born 1968), Italian actor
- Luciano Figueroa (born 1981), Argentine footballer
- Luciano García Alén, Spanish doctor
- Luciano Hang (born 1962), Brazilian billionaire businessman
- Luciano Huck (born 1971), Brazilian TV host and entrepreneur
- Luciano Kulczewski (1896–1972), Chilean architect
- Luciano Leggio (1925–1993), Italian criminal and leading figure of the Sicilian Mafia
- Luchiano Lewis (born 2005), American murderer
- Luciano Luci (born 1949), Italian referee
- Luciano Narsingh (born 1990), Dutch footballer
- Luciano Pavarotti (1935–2007), Italian operatic tenor
- Luciano Soprani (1946–1999), Italian fashion designer
- Luciano de Souza (born 1972), Brazilian footballer
- Luciano Siqueira de Oliveira (born 1975), Brazilian footballer
- Luciano José Pereira da Silva (born 1980), Brazilian footballer
- Luciano da Silva (Triguinho) (born 1979), Brazilian footballer
- Luciano Szafir (born 1968), Brazilian model and actor
- Luciano Vassallo (1935–2022), Italian-Ethiopian footballer
- Luciano Vincenzoni (1926–2013), Italian screenwriter
- Luciano Zacharski (born 1985), Argentine actor
- Luciano Zardi (1930–2026), Italian weightlifter
- Luciano Zerbini (born 1960), Italian discus thrower and shot putter

== Surname ==
=== People ===
- Ascanio Luciano (1621–1706), Italian architectural painter
- Corey Luciano (born 1998), American football player
- Elvis Luciano (born 2000), Dominican baseball player
- Fábio Luciano (born 1975), Brazilian international footballer
- Juan R. Luciano (born c. 1962), US-based Argentine businessman
- Lilia Luciano (born 1984), American journalist
- Lucky Luciano (1897–1962), Italian-American mobster
- Marco Luciano (born 2001), Dominican baseball player
- Michelle Luciano (fl. 2000s–2020s), Scottish psychologist
- Ron Luciano (1937–1995), American baseball umpire

=== Fictional characters ===
- Lightning Larry Luciano, a one-time character in SpongeBob SquarePants
