= Abram Huston House and Carriage House =

Historic house in Pennsylvania, United States

- U.S. National Register of Historic Places
- U.S. Historic district – Contributing property
- U.S. National Historic Landmark District – Contributing property
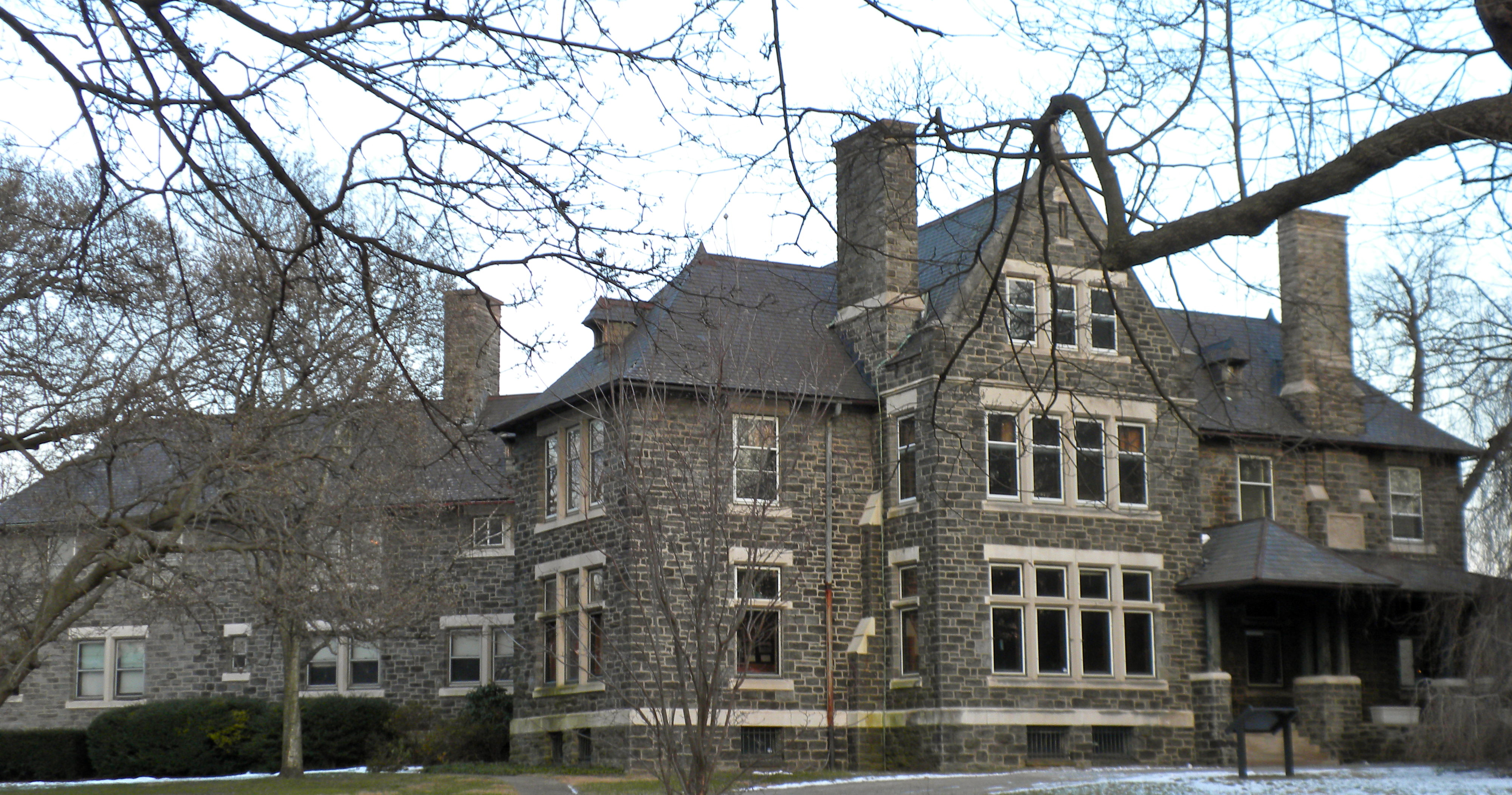
- Graystone, January 2010

- Location within Pennsylvania Location within the United States
- Location: 53 S. 1st Ave., Coatesville, Pennsylvania
- Coordinates: 39°58′54″N 75°49′21″W
- Area: 3.1 acres (1.3 ha)
- Built: 1889
- Architect: Cope & Stewardson
- Part of: Coatesville Historic District; Lukens Historic District (ID87000667; 94001186)
- NRHP reference No.: 77001149

Significant dates
- Added to NRHP: September 15, 1977
- Designated CP: May 14, 1987
- Designated NHLDCP: April 19, 1994

Abram Huston House and Carriage House, also known as the Coatesville City Hall and Police Station and "Graystone Mansion," is a historic building located at Coatesville, Chester County, Pennsylvania. It was designed and built in 1889, by the architectural firm of Cope & Stewardson. The house is a 2 1/2-story building, built of shaped coursed stone, irregularly shaped in plan, and has a two-story wing added in 1925. The carriage house is L-shaped, and features a two-story tower with a conical roof. The house was built as the home of Abram Huston, president of the Lukens Steel Company. The house was Coatesville City Hall and the carriage house was the Coatesville jail from 1939 to 1992.

It was added to the National Register of Historic Places in 1977.
