= Luken =

Luken may refer to:

- Luken (name), given name and surname
- Luken Communications, broadcasting company

== See also ==
- Lukens (disambiguation)
- Lukin, surname
- Lukken, waffle
