= Lukens =

Lukens may refer to:

== People ==
- Anna Lukens (1844-1917), American physician
- Buz Lukens (1931–2010), American politician
- Charles Lukens (1786-1825, British businessman
- Dennis Lukens (born 1952), American soccer coach
- Glen Lukens (1887–1967), American ceramicist and jeweler
- Lewis Lukens (born 1963), American diplomat
- Rebecca Lukens (1794–1854), American businesswoman
- Theodore Lukens (1848–1918), American conservationist

=== Fictional Characters ===
- Rickie Lukens, heist character in GTA V and GTA Online.

== Other ==
- Lukens Historic District, Pennsylvania
- Lukens Steel Company
- Mount Lukens, California
- The King v. Lukens, Pennsylvania lawsuit

== See also ==
- Luken (disambiguation)
- Lukin
