= SS Rebecca Lukens =

World War II Liberty ship of the United States

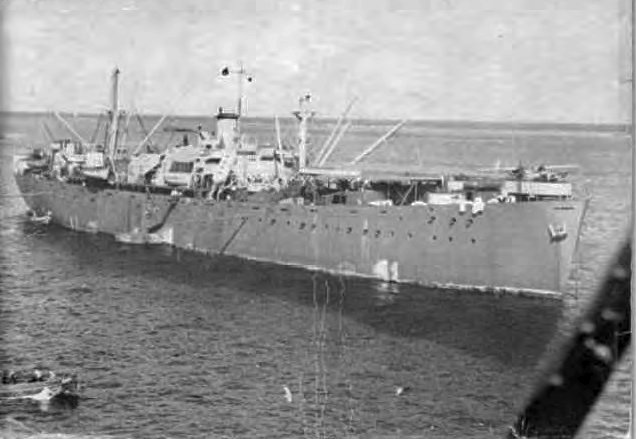
- Rebecca Lukens off Saipan or Iwo Jima

History

United States
- Name: Rebecca Lukens
- Namesake: Rebecca Lukens
- Owner: War Shipping Administration (WSA)
- Ordered: as type (EC2-S-C1) hull, MC hull 1551
- Builder: J.A. Jones Construction, Panama City, Florida
- Cost: $1,333,920
- Yard number: 33
- Way number: 6
- Laid down: 7 January 1944
- Launched: 4 March 1944
- Completed: 10 April 1944
- In service: 1944-1946
- Fate: Transferred to the Army Transport Service (ATS), 10 April 1944

United States
- Name: Rebecca Lukens; Major General Herbert A. Dargue
- Namesake: Herbert A. Dargue
- Owner: WSA
- Operator: ATS
- Acquired: 10 April 1944
- Commissioned: 1944
- Decommissioned: 1946
- In service: 1944-1946
- Renamed: April 1945
- Refit: Converted to an Aircraft Repair Unit (Floating) (ARU(F))
- Identification: ARU(F)-2
- Fate: Sold for scrapping, 3 September 1970

General characteristics
- Class & type: Liberty ship; type EC2-S-C1, standard
- Tonnage: 7,237 short tons (6,565 t)
- Displacement: 4,474 short tons (4,059 t)
- Length: 441 feet (134 m)
- Beam: 57 feet (17 m)
- Draft: 28-foot (8.5 m) draft
- Installed power: triple-expansion reciprocating steam engines
- Propulsion: 500 horsepower (370 kW) steam engine
- Speed: 11 knots (13 mph; 20 km/h)
- Capacity: 4,380 net short tons (3,970 t)
- Complement: 38–62 USMM; 21–40 USNAG
- Armament: stern-mounted 4-in deck gun 3 x 20-mm (0.79-in) Oerlikon AA guns

General characteristics ARU(F)
- Type: Aircraft Repair Unit (Floating)
- Boats & landing craft carried: 2 × motor launches; 2 × LCVPs; 2 × DUKWs----
- Complement: 26 USAAF officers; 319 USAAF enlisted men
- Aircraft carried: 4 × Sikorsky R-4s
- Aviation facilities: 3 × Landing platforms

SS Rebecca Lukens was a Liberty ship built in the United States during World War II. She was named after Rebecca Lukens, the owner and manager of the iron and steel mill which became the Lukens Steel Company of Coatesville, Pennsylvania.

She was converted in 1944 at Point Clear, Alabama into an Aircraft Repair Unit (Floating) and transferred to the Army Transport Service (ATS), after which she was renamed Major General Herbert A. Dargue, for Herbert Dargue, a pioneering military aviator in the United States Army.

== Construction ==
Rebecca Lukens was laid down on 7 January 1944, under a Maritime Commission (MARCOM) contract, MC hull 1551, by J.A. Jones Construction, Panama City, Florida; she was launched on 4 March 1944.

== History ==
She was allocated to the Army Transport Service on 10 April 1944. She was converted at Point Clear, Alabama into an Aircraft Repair Unit (Floating) (ARU(F)) and designated USAAFS Rebecca Lukens (ARU(F)-2). The conversion added the shops to the Liberty ship, including machine, sheet metal, radiator, tank, wood, pattern, blue print, electrical, fabric and dope, paint, air-conditioned instrument and camera, radio, battery, propeller, tires and fuel cells, armament and turrets, plating, oxygen plant, radar, carburetor, and turbo-super-charger. Two LCVPs and two DUKWs were added for ship to shore transportation along with three or four Sikorsky R-4s helicopters.

The crew was given two weeks training in seamanship at the Grand Hotel in Point Clear, Alabama, on Mobile Bay. Classes included; swimming, elementary seamanship, life saving equipment, and advanced seamanship.

On 1 October 1944, Rebecca Lukens sailed from Brookley Field for the Pacific, commanded by Lieutenant Colonel William McCraw, USAAF. She first visited Guantanamo Bay, Cuba, to meet up with a convoy for Eniwetok.

On 19 November 1944, Rebecca Lukens arrived off Saipan, and began her mission of repairing the B-29s that were beginning their bombing missions of mainland Japan. Because the roads had not been finished yet her helicopters carried the parts to and from the ship to the air base. Rebecca Lukens was the sole supplier of breathing oxygen for the high altitude B-29s, she was averaging 100 cylinders of compressed breathable oxygen a day. On 6 December, her gunners shot down a Japanese Mitsubishi G4M "Betty" bomber.

Rebecca Lukens set sail for Iwo Jima, on 16 April 1945. At the end of April Rebecca Lukens was renamed Major General Herbert A. Dargue. On 22 May 1945, she shot down another "Betty" with assistance from on shore anti-aircraft batteries.

Between November 1944 and 1 September 1945, Major General Herbert A. Dargue supplied B-29s and P-51s with over 38,000 parts and units, ranging from spark plugs to the central fire controls for the B-29.

On 2 March 1946, she was laid up in the National Defense Reserve Fleet, in the James River Group, in Lee Hall, Virginia. On 3 September 1970, she was sold for $41,330 to Horton Industry, Inc., for scrapping. She was removed from the fleet on 21 September 1970.

== Bibliography ==
- "Jones Construction, Panama City FL". www.ShipbuildingHistory.com. 13 October 2010.
- "Liberty Ships – World War II".
- Maritime Administration. "Rebecca Lukens". Ship History Database Vessel Status Card. U.S. Department of Transportation, Maritime Administration. Archived from the original on 12 December 2019.
- Davies, James (May 2004). "Specifications (As-Built)" (PDF). p. 23.
- "SS Rebecca Lukens".
- "The Second Was Always First" (PDF). Archived from the original (PDF) on 4 March 2016.
