= General Steel Industries =

Rolling stock manufacturer

Coordinates: 39.8599°N 75.3377°W

General Steel Industries, Inc.
- Industry: Foundry; Steel; Manufacturing; Defense
- Founded: 1928 as General Steel Castings Corporation
- Defunct: 1981
- Headquarters: Eddystone, Pennsylvania (1928 - 1948); Granite City, Illinois (1948 - 1970?); St. Louis, Missouri (1970? - 1981)

General Steel Industries, Inc. (GSI) was an American steel company that operated independently from 1928 to 1981. It was founded by two locomotive manufacturers and a foundry as General Steel Castings Corporation in Eddystone, Pennsylvania. The following year, it acquired the Commonwealth Steel Company, a critical supplier to the rail industry, and the year after that, completed its own modern steel foundry.

In the late 1950s, the company began acquiring other companies in an effort to diversify from its core business of manufacturing large steel castings. By 1971, it had six divisions and one subsidiary. Two years later, it closed its original Castings Division.

In 1974, GSI was operating 19 plants across the United States and internationally and continued operating as an independent company until it was acquired by Lukens Steel in 1981.

== General Steel Castings ==
General Steel Castings Corp.'s logo (Also used to represent the Castings Division of General Steel Industries, Inc.)

The General Steel Castings Corporation was a steel casting corporation in the United States established in 1928 by the Baldwin Locomotive Works, American Locomotive Company, and American Steel Foundries.

The company began construction on its new foundry and headquarters on 112 acres (45 ha), in Eddystone, Pennsylvania, near Baldwin Locomotive's facilities. The new plant opened two years later, circa July 1930, and produced castings weighing from 100 to 110,000 pounds (45 to 49,895 kg).

On July 30, 1929, the company completed its acquisition of the Commonwealth Steel Company and its plant in Granite City, Illinois. Commonwealth Steel was a major supplier of large steel castings, used in products produced by General Steel's owners, such as one-piece locomotive beds 52 feet (15.85 m) long weighing about 40,500 pounds (18,400 kg) and large cast steel underframes for railroad cars. By 1930 the company was making one-piece locomotive beds with integral cylinders and cradle, pilot beams, Delta trailer trucks, and water-bottom tenderframes that were over 87 feet (26.52 m) long.

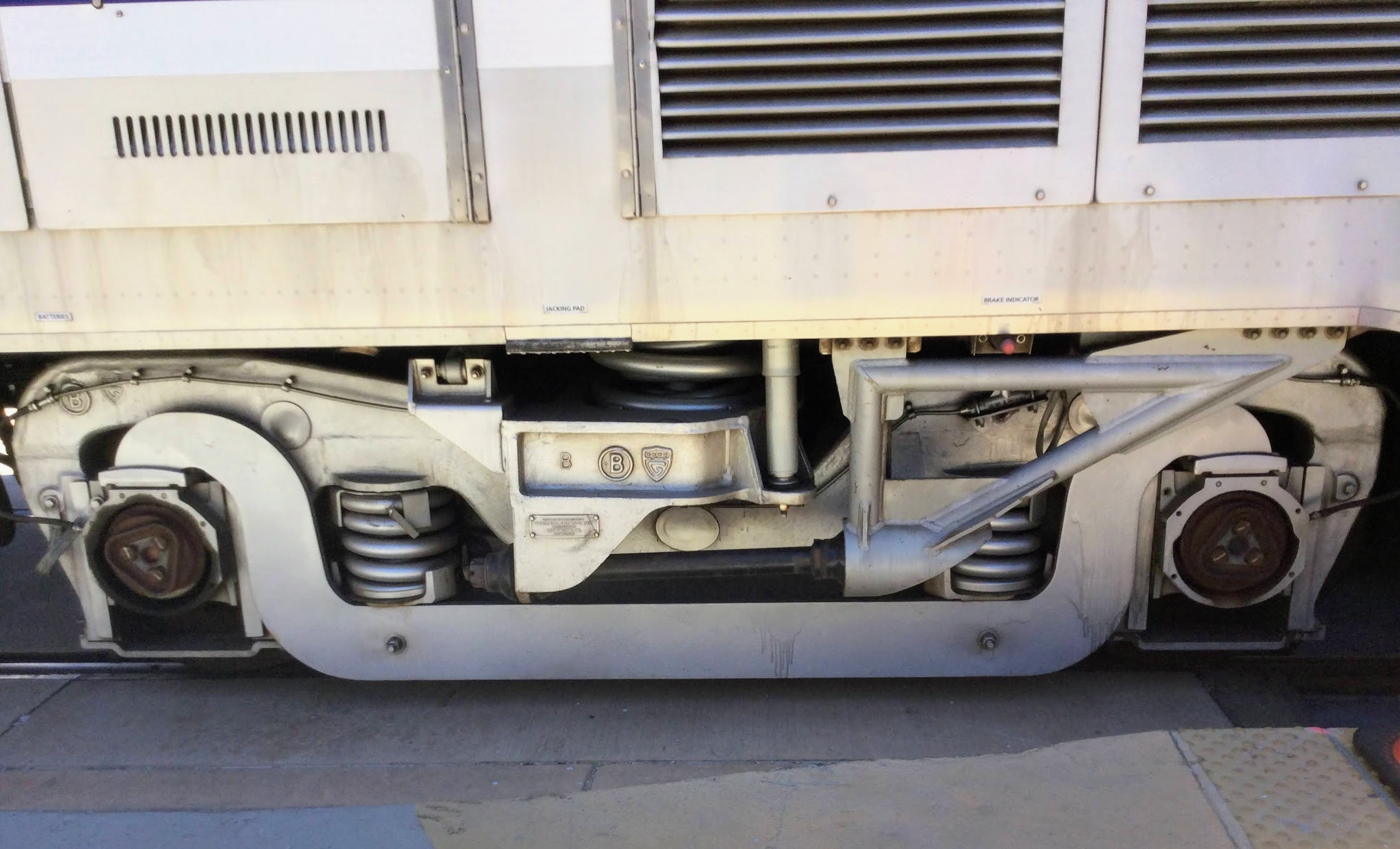
GSI truck on an Amtrak Pacific Surfliner passenger coach car.

As reported in The Commonwealther, "[t]he new Company, with larger resources and with two plants equipped to produce Commonwealth devices, will undoubtedly mean a better serving of the country with devices for the railroads and other customers. As stated by Mr. Howard [Commonwealth Steel's president, Clarence H. Howard]… the cooperation of the locomotive companies with us should mean a wider field of opportunities for our organization, our men, and our product."

The company's first Board of Directors meeting, after the acquisition of Commonwealth Steel, was held on August 7, 1929 and included among the attendees the president of the Pullman Company, David A. Crawford, President William C. Dickerman of the American Locomotive Company, and President George H. Houston of the Baldwin Locomotive Company. Clarence Howard, the president of the Commonwealth Steel Company became Chairman of the Board of Directors and continued his duties at the Commonwealth Division of the now larger company.

General Steel operated two plants, one in Eddystone, Pennsylvania and one in Granite City, Illinois.

The company, initially using the products developed by Commonwealth Steel, specialized in large castings including tank armor and gun turrets, locomotive frames and trucks.

Over the years, the company expanded into other industrial areas. On May 1, 1961, the company changed its name to reflect its diversified business portfolio and became General Steel Industries.

== Early history as General Steel Industries ==
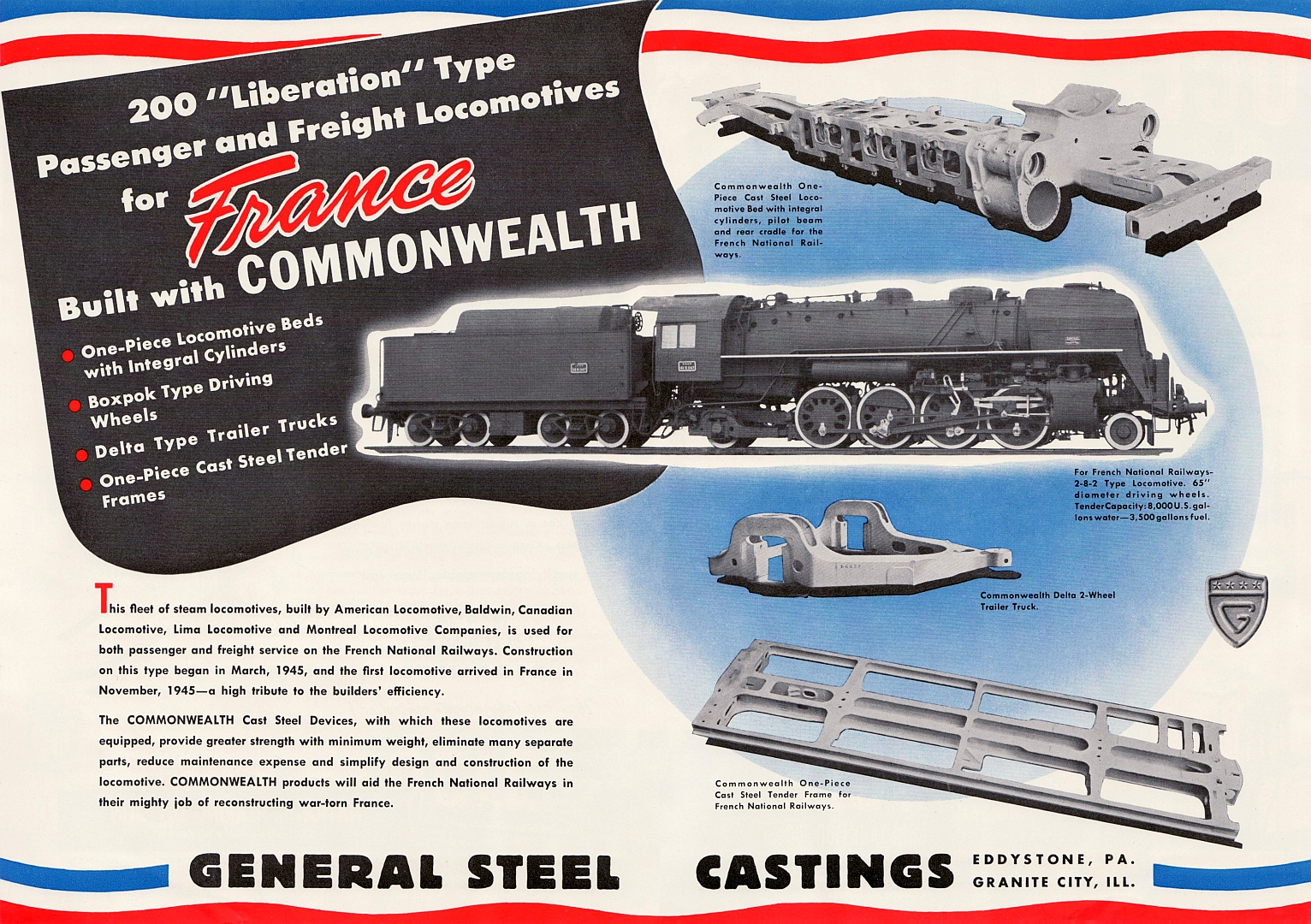
General Steel Castings advertisement for cast steel locomotive frames.

In 1929, General Steel Castings Corp. acquired the Commonwealth Steel Company, a Granite City, Illinois based maker of steel, steel castings, and railroad supplies that had been founded in 1901, and had become a supplier to railroad companies. Commonwealth Steel had manufactured large cast steel bolsters for passenger cars for exhibit at the 1904 St. Louis World's Fair, and designed and produced a one-piece locomotive bed in 1926. By 1928, "practically all locomotives and passenger cars built in the United States" were using Commonwealth products.

General Steel's purchase of Commonwealth included Commonwealth's foundry and its new General Office Building, completed in 1926, both located at 1417 State Street, Granite City, Illinois. After the Commonwealth Steel acquisition, General Steel had two divisions, the Eddystone Division in Pennsylvania and the Commonwealth Division in Illinois. Only the Commonwealth Division was operational; the Eddystone Division's plant would not be completed until 1930. The Illinois operation was commonly referred to as the "Commonwealth," and was located at 1417 State Street in Granite City. During World War II, the Commonwealth plant manufactured steel for armor and cast steel tank hulls and turrets, and employed about 5,200 people. After the war, the company returned to manufacturing locomotive castings in Granite City and earth-moving equipment in Eddystone.

Fortune magazine ranked the company 464, 481, and 441 in the magazine's Fortune 500 listing in 1962, 1963, and 1964, respectively. Employees numbered 3,650 in 1962, 4,200 in 1963, and 4,400 in 1964.

== Expansion ==
In 1948, the company's headquarters was moved from Eddystone to Granite City. In the mid-1950s, the company expanded its focus from steel castings products to a more diversified company through an acquisition program that included purchasing National Roll & Foundry Company in 1955, St. Louis Car Company in June 1960, Ludlow-Saylor Wire Cloth, Flex-O-Lite, Standard Pipeprotection, and Simplicity Engineering Corporation. Standard Pipeprotection Division was created from a series of acquisitions.

Recognizing the company had grown beyond its original business of manufacturing steel castings, the company changed its name to General Steel Industries, Incorporated on May 1, 1961. The company's first two plants, the Eddystone plant and the Granite City plant, the acquired Commonwealth Steel facility, became the Castings Division, and both plants continued to produce large steel castings. For example, in 1961, the Eddystone plant provided 85% of the steel castings used in the Union Electric Company's new Taum Sauk hydroelectric power station near St. Louis, and produced railroad specialty products such as "the world's highest capacity flat car", weighing almost 75 tons, with a load limit of 300 tons. The Granite City plant produced "engineered cast steel specialty products" for the railroad industry including one-piece locomotive beds, one-piece cast steel flat car underframes, and wear-resistant manganese steel casting, used in mining and crushing equipment and heavy-duty power shovels.

In the 1950s, the company, then as General Steel Castings, introduced the Commonwealth 53' 6" flatcar that became one of the railroad industry's most commonly used flatcars during the 1950s and 1960s. This flatcar remained in production, with only minor changes, into the early 1970s.

At the Granite City plant, General Steel x-rayed uranium ingots for the Atomic Energy Commission from 1958 through 1966 using two U.S. Government-owned Allis-Chalmers betatrons (Magnetic Induction Electron Accelerators) apparatuses on loan to the company. The betatrons were still at the plant in late 1992 "in a building on the southern section of the plant property" and the contamination from the use of the betatrons was determined to be "highly localized, confined to a few areas, and contained inside an unused building." The building "had residual radioactive contamination until remediation in 1993."

As a defense contractor, the company manufactured cast armor hulls and turrets for the U.S. Army M-60 medium tanks, produced at Granite City and Eddystone, as part of an $8 million contract awarded by Chrysler Corporation in 1961.

By 1971, the Granite City plant had grown to be 127 acres (51 ha) with 42 acres (17 ha) under roof and was bordered by the Madison city boundaries on the south, 16th Street on the north, State Street on the east, and the railroad tracks that run along Route 3 on the west.

== Operating units and highlights ==
Castings Division	Plants: Granite City, Illinois; Eddystone, Pennsylvania (until 1964) Main Office: Granite City, Illinois (from 1948)	Eddystone, Pennsylvania - the company's original headquarters, the plant produced castings for major industry including electric power, earthmoving equipment, shipbuilding, and some railroad products; Housed the company's Manufacturing Research Laboratory (completed in 1960); Operations consolidated at the Granite City plant in 1964 Granite City, Illinois (former Commonwealth plant) - In 1960, produced engineered cast steel specialty products for rail industry including one-piece cast steel flat car underframes, cast armor, and manganese wear-resistant steel castings used in mining and crushing equipment and powers shovels; In 1970, produced "massive, high-strength pressure castings for steam turbine electric power generating plants, both conventional and nuclear fueled," produced cast steel products for railroads, including trucks for diesel locomotives and rapid transit and commuter cars, and wear-resistant castings for earth-moving equipment; Plant grew to 127 acres (0.51 km^{2}) with 42 acres (170,000 m^{2}) under roof; Division discontinuance announced December 14, 1972
St. Louis Car Division	Plant and Main Office: St. Louis, Missouri (acquired June 1960)	Had been leading manufacturer of rail rapid transit equipment and produced specialized railroad cars such as commuter cars, chair and lounge cars, postal storage mail cars, baggage cars, and cabooses and other products like aircraft loading bridges and passenger vehicles for airport transportation systems; Orders from the New York Transit Authority total over 1,800 subway cars; Company acquired on June 30, 1960 and merged into the parent company to become a division on January 1, 1962; Supplied the superstructures for the first group of 183 Vert-A-Pac automobile carriers in 1970 Division discontinuance announced December 14, 1972 and all production ended in 1973
National Roll Steel	Plant and Main Office: Avonmore, Pennsylvania (acquired in 1955)	Manufactured cast iron and cast steel rolls, in a range of alloys, weighing from 500 to 100,000 pounds, custom-made for steel mills to reduce and shape; In 1974 was the company's largest division after the closure of the St. Louis Car division in 1973. Market Share of roll market: 1955: 2.7%; 1974 14.1%; The plant had 4 acres (16,000 m^{2}) under roof and could ship 2,000 tons of plain and grooved rolls each month.
Flex-O-Lite Division	Plant and Main Office: St. Louis, Missouri; Other plants: Paris, Texas; Keyser, West Virginia; DeSoto, Missouri; Canada; and West Germany	Manufactured reflective glass products for highway and traffic safety; optical glass spheres for reflective sheeting; reflective line marking tape; Loc-Lens reflective sheeting; reflective paints; glass beads for industrial metal finishing and treatment
Ludlow-Saylor Wire Cloth Division	Plant and Main Office: St. Louis, Missouri; Other plants: City of Industry, California and in Oakland, California operating as Star Wire Screen	Manufactured woven metallic wire cloths and wire screen products ranging from .003-inch wire to 1-inch (25 mm) rod used in mining, crushing, petrochemical, construction, and food processing industries to grade, filter, sift, or classify product
Standard Pipeprotection Division	Plant and Main Office: St. Louis, Missouri; Other plants: Alton, Illinois; Houston, Texas; Pittsburg, California; Kearny, New Jersey; Lorain, Ohio; and Hammond, Indiana	Created by a series of acquisitions, the division manufactured protective coatings for gas, oil, and water pipelines and extruded plastic pipe for gas distribution and other pipeline installations
Simplicity Engineering Company	Plant and Main Office: Durand, Michigan; Canadian plant: Guelph, Ontario	Manufactured screening, crushing, and conveying equipment for processing and grading sand, gravel, crushed stone, and of foundry shakeout equipment
GSI Engineering Division	Based in Granite City, Illinois	The only non-manufacturing unit, started in 1973, engineered and designed railcar, locomotive trucks and suspension systems, provided consulting services to the transportation industry, and assumed the responsibility for licensing the company's products.

== Discontinued operations ==
In 1964, declining demand for large steel castings and excess capacity from operating two foundries led the company to consolidate the Castings Division's operations at its Granite City plant at 1417 State Street in Granite City, Illinois. The Eddystone plant was sold to the Vertol Co. (now Boeing) and converted to the manufacture of helicopters and aviation components. The plant is still in use as of 2014.

Fortunes for both the St. Louis Car Division and the Castings Division began to fade in the mid-1960s. "The smooth, comfortable ride of the modern railroad passenger car is the direct result of General Steel's historic development of new designs of trucks with cast steel frames and bolsters" but the development of new designs would at least partially result in the end of St. Louis Car. In 1970, St. Louis Car won two large fixed-price contracts for rapid transit and commuter cars but "the complexity of new engineering and manufacturing techniques for cars of such advanced design was underestimated" leading to recording a charge of $6,400,000 in 1971 for the expected loss on fulfilling the orders. As the company's largest division at the time, losses at St. Louis Car sank the entire enterprise's net income into the red. At the Castings Division, the Granite City plant improved production efficiency and lowered its breakeven point but a strike from November 20, 1971 to January 17, 1972 completely halted production.

General Steel Industries, Inc. Castings Division's Granite City, Illinois plant, circa 1970

On December 14, 1972, management announced the company's Castings Division and its St. Louis Car Division were to be closed, and after the delivery of pending orders, the divisions' assets were to be liquidated (expected to occur in 1973). The reasons stated to discontinue operations at the two divisions included significant losses and competitive pressure. St. Louis Car incurred losses for seven of the previous eight years and "GSI lacks the financial resources needed to compete with several much larger companies which recently entered the transit car building industry."

The Castings Division had not produced satisfactory earnings for five years, lost about $3 million in 1972, and "was not competitive in most of its major markets and there were no prospects for future improvement of its position." The company recorded a charge of $31,173,000 for the anticipated cost of discontinuing the unprofitable divisions. The closing of the Castings Division ended the company's manufacture of steel castings, products the company had been producing since its founding. The five remaining operating units were: National Roll, Flex-O-Lite, Ludlow-Saylor Wire Cloth Division, Standard Pipeprotection, and Simplicity Engineering Company (a subsidiary).

General Steel continued operations at the Granite City plant until orders, pending at the time of the December 1972 announcement of the Castings Division's closing, were completed. The property at 1417 State Street, Granite City, Illinois was purchased by Granite City Steel, a subsidiary of National Steel Corporation, in 1974 and the property became known as the South Plant. Granite City Steel likely occupied the facility until the parent company's bankruptcy liquidation in 2003.

In 1971, General Steel's corporate offices were at One Memorial Drive, St. Louis, Missouri. In 1973, the company's offices had moved to 8474 Delport Drive (8400 Midland Blvd.), also in St. Louis, and the concern launched a new consulting services division, GSI Engineering, to design railcar and locomotive trucks and suspension systems, and to manage the licensing of company products that were in service in 50 countries.

Less than a decade later, when General Steel was acquired by Lukens Steel in 1981 for $66 million, it was a producer of steel, crushing and conveying equipment, reflective highway signs, and protective coatings for oil and gas pipelines.

== Castings Division Plant remains ==
By October 2009, most of the buildings at the former General Steel plant, including the old Commonwealth foundry at 1417 State Street, Granite City, Illinois had been demolished. About half of the General Office Building, built by Commonwealth Steel in 1926, remains standing. On the north end of the property, there are still several buildings in use.

== Gallery ==
General Steel Industries, Inc. Granite City, Illinois Castings Division's Plant

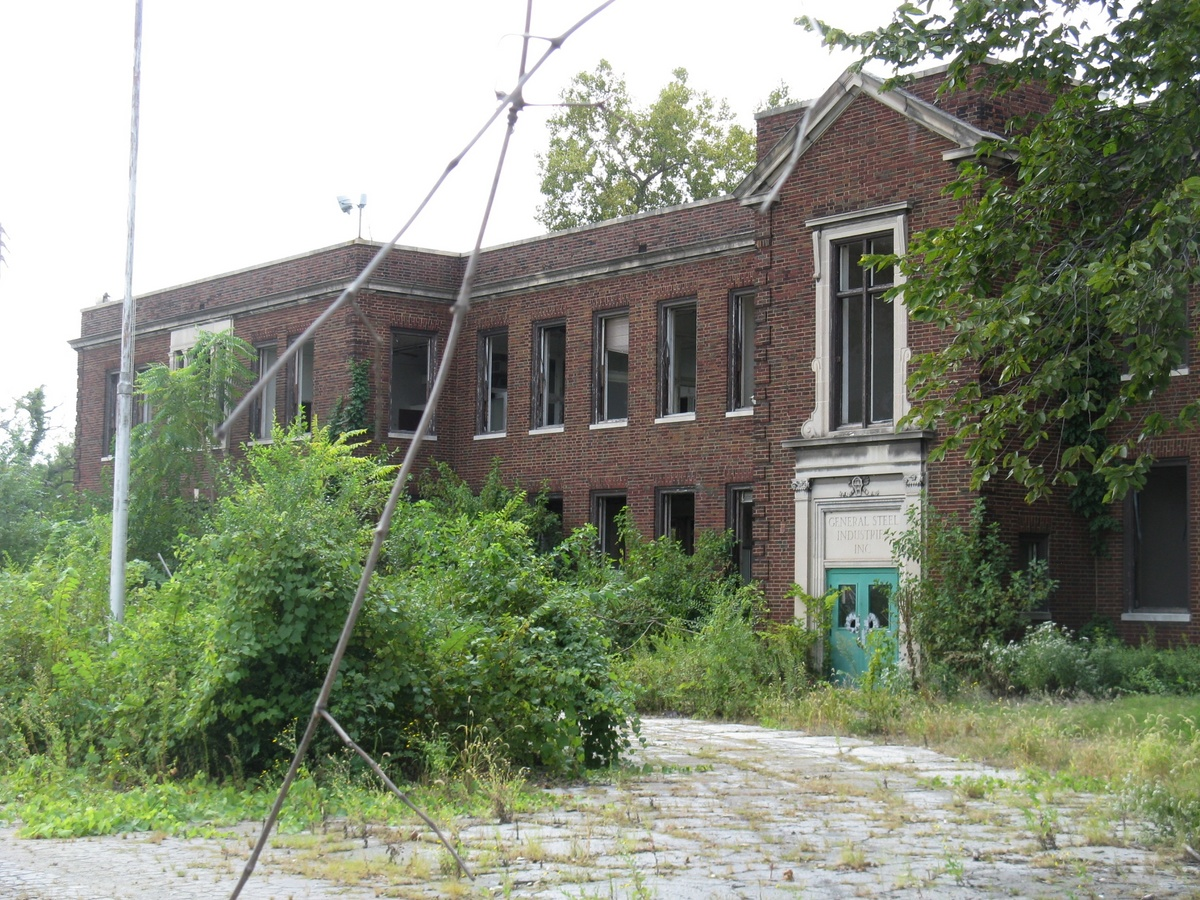
General Steel Industries, Inc. Granite City, Illinois Castings Division's Plant

Logo used by General Steel Castings Corp. and by the Castings Division of General Steel Industries

Logo used on Company stationery in 1964

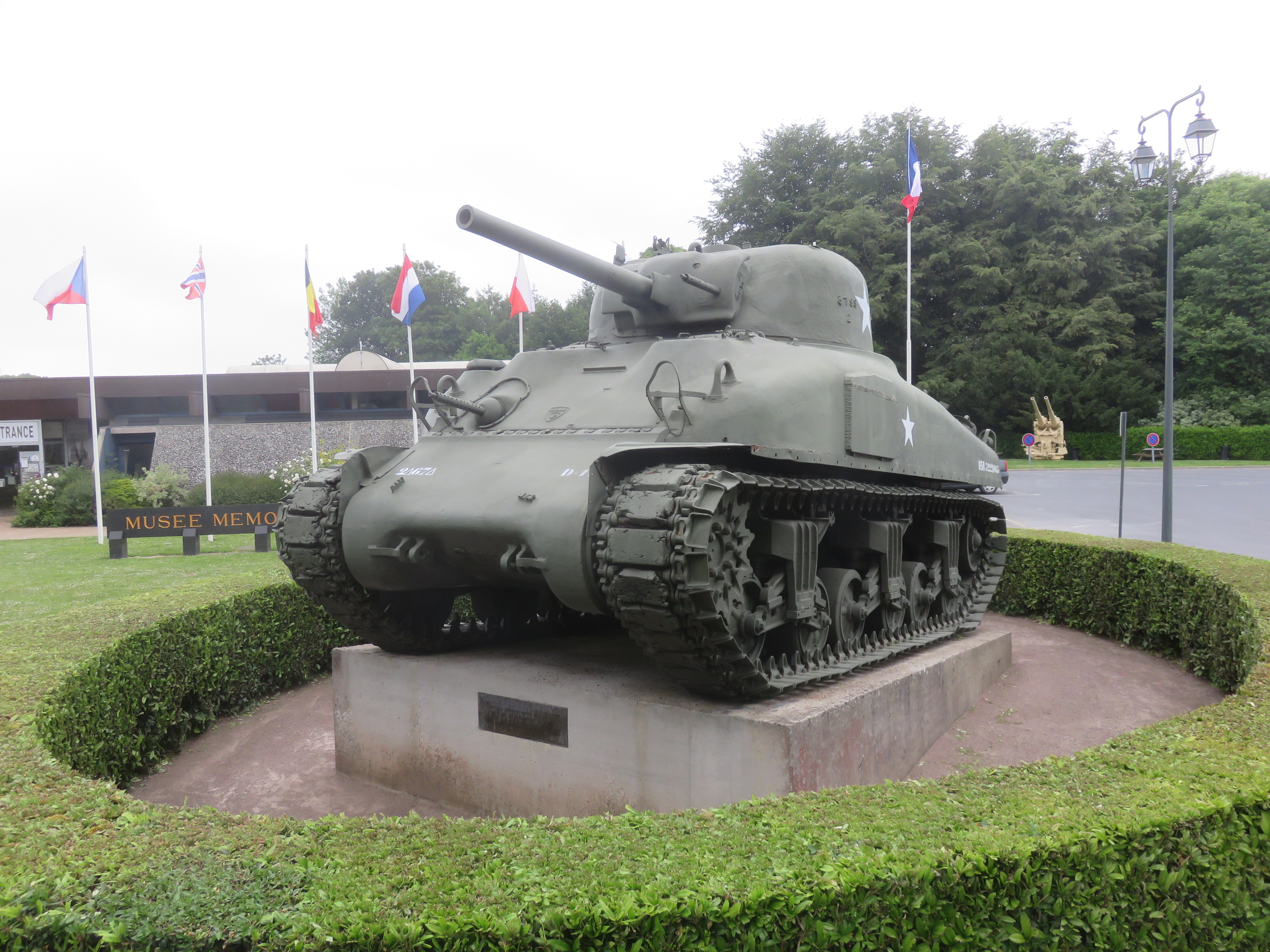
Modified Grizzly tank with General Steel Casting's "G" logo
