= Commonwealth Steel Company =

American steel company

The Commonwealth Steel Company was an American steel company based in Granite City, Illinois, founded in 1901 "by some of the young men who had helped establish the American Steel Foundry". The company produced steel castings and railroad supplies at its 10-acre (4-hectare) plant, employing about 1,500 people.

Commonwealth Steel Company's plant in Granite City, Illinois, in 1904

Over the years, its innovative steel castings products made Commonwealth an increasingly important manufacturer and supplier to the rail industry. By 1928, "practically all locomotives and passenger cars built in the United States" were using Commonwealth products. The significance of the company to the rail industry became evident when two locomotive manufacturers, and customers of Commonwealth, the Baldwin Locomotive Company and the American Locomotive Company, formed General Steel Castings Corporation in 1928 and incorporated Commonwealth and its products as the Commonwealth Steel Division.

== Early history ==
Clarence H. Howard, who controlled the Double Body Bolster Company, received orders for cast-steel bolsters for railroad passenger cars to be used in an exhibit at the upcoming 1904 St. Louis World's Fair but his company was unable to produce bolsters of the specified size. Cast steel bolsters of that size had not been previously manufactured. Howard negotiated with the Commonwealth Steel Company to produce the new steel bolsters and he assisted during the production process. Along with his former schoolmates, H. M. Pflager and G. K. Hoblitzelle, Howard assumed control of Commonwealth in 1904. He headed the company for 23 years, retiring in April 1931, two years after Commonwealth merged with General Steel Castings Corporation, and only months before his death in December 1931.

== Company promotion of citizenship ==
The company was supportive of Americanization (helping foreigners adapt to the American way of life) efforts among the large immigrant population at Lincoln Place, providing free English-language classes to non-English speakers, and was strongly in favor of Prohibition. An article in the December 1915 issue of The Commonwealther was titled: "A saloon is sometimes called a bar - and so it is!" The company also encouraged fellowship and the Golden Rule through the Fellowship Club.

The company established the Commonwealth School in 1906 to serve the educational needs of "Commonwealthers". Apprentices would be given up to four hours a week, on company time, to study mathematics, mechanical drawing and blue print reading.

The company's educational offering expanded with the addition of a high school program in December 1923. Conducted in cooperation with the local high school, Community High School, and authorities of Granite City, Illinois and State educational authorities, the graduates of Commonwealth School's high school program received diplomas along with the regular graduates of Community High School. By the end of 1927, the Commonwealth School was offering the following programs with almost 200 employees enrolled: Apprentice School, Night School Drawing, Eighth Grade School, High School, University Extension Courses, Special Engineering Class, Trade Knowledge Courses, Scholarships, and School Dinners.

Employees shared in the company's profits. Meetings of the company's profit-sharing plan, known as the Commonwealth Plan, would start with the reciting of the Lord's Prayer and, in at least one meeting, the singing of "America". The Platform of the "Commonwealth Plan", read in part: "Fellowship is the Golden Rule in action, the motive power of human engineering, the life-blood of service, insuring equal opportunity for all. The Commonwealth Plan recognizes all problems as mutual, wherein and whereby absolute confidence exists in the honesty of purpose and truth of character of each other; thus blending brotherly love in all activities and enabling each to develop his several talents."

== Innovation and growth ==
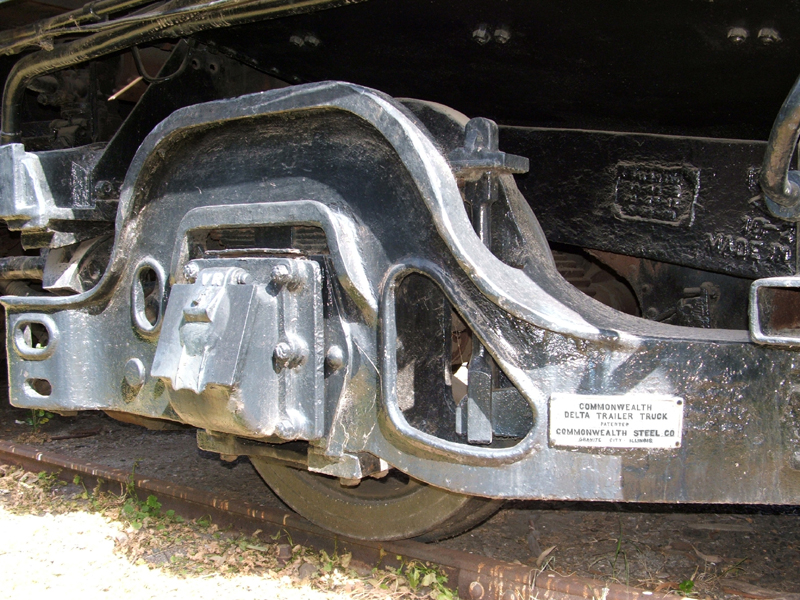
Delta trailing truck casting by Commonwealth Steel Company on a preserved 1929 Victorian Railways X class locomotive, Australia

Commonwealth set the standard for innovation. In 1908, the company cast the first one-piece rectangular tender frame and, after developing special machining equipment, overcame problems of producing castings of up to 80 feet (24.38 m) long. During World War I, the company produced cast steel frames for gun tractors and locomotive castings. The growth of the company meant that, by 1913, its payroll exceeded $110,000 ($3.25 million in 2022 dollars) for each pay period.

The company's success in supplying large castings and other parts to the rail industry necessitated more capacity. Originally covering 16 acres (6 hectares), the plant grew to 47 acres (19 hectares) in 1915 to about 77 acres (31 hectares), with almost 18 acres (7 hectares) under roof, by 1924.

In 1924, the company finished the design and manufactured a one-piece underframe structure, or bed, for a steam locomotive, and delivered it to the New York Central Railroad. Also in 1924, the company embarked on a $1,500,000 ($25.7 million in 2022 dollars) expansion that included increasing the size of the foundry to a total length of 1,475 feet (450 m), making it "probably the largest open hearth steel foundry building in the world". That increased plant capacity by 35% and allowed it to produce the "largest steel castings in the world".

With the completion of the new General Office Building on the site of its plant at 1417 State Street in Granite City, Illinois, the company's headquarters was relocated from the Pierce Building in St. Louis, Missouri to Granite City beginning on February 23, 1926. By 1927, the facility expanded to 350 acres (142 hectares) with the plant itself covering approximately 30 acres (12 hectares). The foundry alone was over a third of a mile long, 1,875 feet or 572 meters.

In 1926, the company produced a "one-piece locomotive bed with cylinders, steam chests, and saddle cast integral" and delivered it to the Terminal Railroad Association of St. Louis and, during this same period, cast steel underframes and trucks were developed for electric locomotives. By 1928, "practically all locomotives and passenger cars built in the United States" were made using products manufactured at the Commonwealth plant.

== Merger ==
An April 12, 1929 St. Louis Post-Dispatch newspaper article, reprinted in the April 1929 issue of The Commonwealther, noted "[t]he Commonwealth, largely because of its one-piece castings, does business with railroads all over the world. It is commonly thought not to have a competitor in the production of a one-piece frame for locomotives and coaches, a feat of casting that has at once made its business unique and added immensely to the safety of railroad travel."

The importance of Commonwealth Steel to the railroad industry was not ignored by the industry and was underscored when two major locomotive companies, the American Locomotive Company and the Baldwin Locomotive Company, along with American Steel Foundries, formed General Steel Castings Corporation in 1928. The April 1929 issue of The Commonwealther printed a statement from the president of the company, Clarence Howard, that Commonwealth Steel was "working out a plan of unification" with General Steel Castings Corporation.

With a capitalization of $10 million, Commonwealth Steel was acquired by General Steel Castings Corporation for a reported $35 million. The merger became effective "definitely on July 30, 1929", and the Commonwealth Steel Company became the "Commonwealth Division" of General Steel Castings Corporation. General Steel's "Eddystone Division" consisted of a new foundry, still under construction in 1929, on the banks of the Delaware River in Eddystone, Pennsylvania, near Baldwin Locomotive's facilities.
