= Locomotive frame =

Chassis for a self-propelled railway vehicle

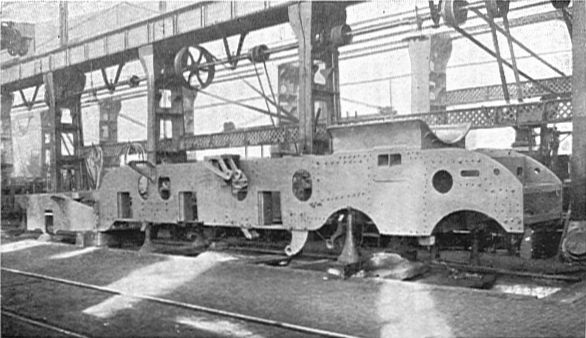
Locomotive frame of a LNER Gresley Pacific locomotive during construction

A locomotive frame is the structure that forms the backbone of the railway locomotive, giving it strength and supporting the superstructure elements such as a cab, boiler or bodywork. The vast majority of locomotives have had a frame structure of some kind. The frame may in turn be supported by axles directly attached to it, or it may be mounted on bogies (known as trucks in American English), or a combination of the two. The bogies in turn will have frames of their own.

== Rigid Frames ==
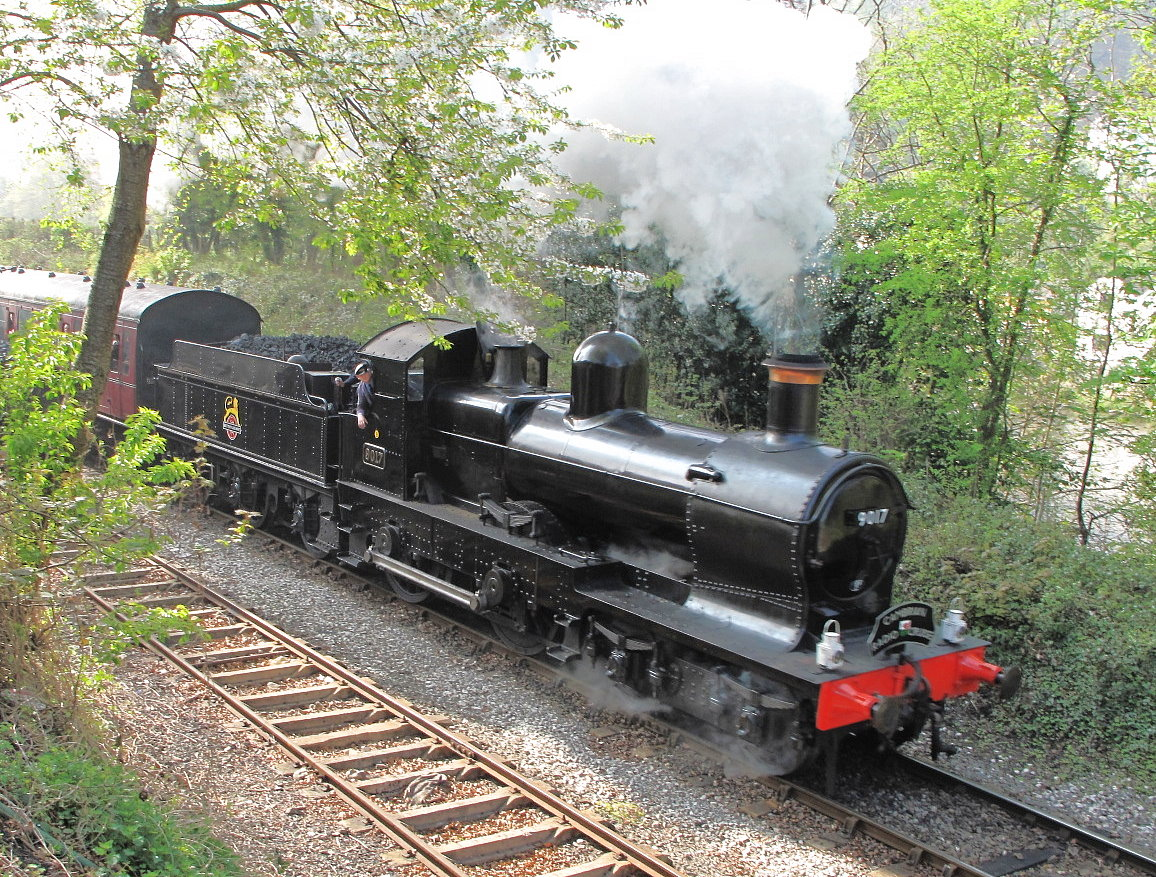
Preserved GWR 9017 showing outside frames

Three main types of rigid frame on steam locomotives may be distinguished:

=== Plate frames ===
Plate frames use tall steel plates about 1–1.5 in (25.4–38.1 mm) thick running lengthwise down the locomotive as the main structural members, with cross stays riveted or bolted to them to provide lateral strength. They were mainly used in Britain and continental Europe, where their generally higher strength to weight ratio and high vertical stiffness matched the lighter permitted axle loadings and often smoother track. Plate frames have a large amount of free space between the main frame plates, so inside mounted cylinders and motion driving a cranked axle and a deep and narrow firebox mounted between the frames were common features. However, they are largely precluded from using a wider firebox grate without a trailing axle or bogie, as the height of the frame plates prevents a sufficiently deep firebox without limiting maximum boiler diameter considerably, as on the BR Standard Class 9F which was designed a wide but very shallow firebox and ashpan. Plate frames are susceptible to fatigue cracking, especially with outside cylinders and cranked drivers, as they are relatively flexible laterally and the action of the pistons and reciprocating motion imparts lateral stresses to the frames. By 1939, all of the LNER Gresley Classes A1 and A3 locomotives had all had their frames either majorly repaired or replaced due to cracking.

=== Bar frames ===
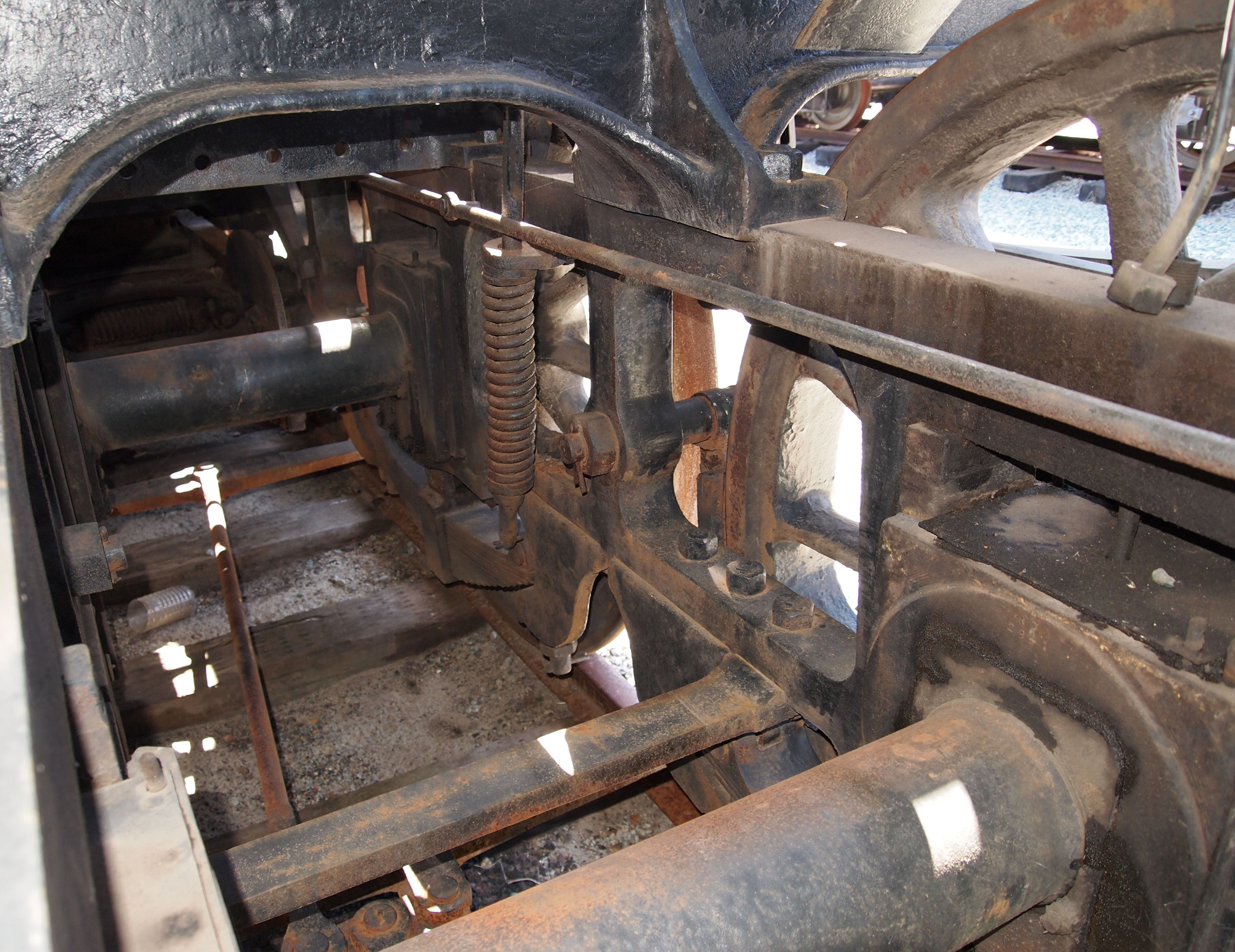
Bar frames of a WAGR U class locomotive

Bar frames are openwork girder structures built up from large steel bars or cast parts welded and/or bolted into a single load-bearing assembly. They were first used on the Bury Bar Frame locomotive during the 1830s, and were widely used in nineteenth- and early twentieth-century North American-built locomotives, but saw use in some parts of Europe, especially Germany on the DRG standard steam locomotives. Bar frames are generally lower profile vertically than plate frames, but have much less horizontal space between the main members. As such, locomotives built with bar frames that lacked a trailing axle or bogie had wider and somewhat shallower fireboxes mounted above the frame and rear driving wheels instead of a narrow and deep firebox mounted between the frames like on plate frame locomotives. Bar frame locomotives almost always had their cylinders mounted outside the frames with cranked wheels as standard due to the limited space between the frame. Bar frames are much more rigid laterally than plate frames, but less so vertically, and tend to be heavier than plate frames due to the thickness of the structural members.

=== Cast steel beds ===
Cast steel engine beds were developed in the latter years of steam locomotive design in the United States. They are an evolution of the bar frame, being cast in one integral piece and machined to final form instead of built up from bar stock and/or smaller castings. Sometimes these included cylinders and steam chests as part of the casting. These have greater rigidity than both bar frames and plate frames, with no bolts or rivets to work loose. Cast engine beds were usually made by General Steel Industries for the various locomotive manufacturers and railways that used them.

=== Inside and Outside Frames ===
Most steam locomotives have the frame inside the wheels; this is termed an "inside frame". Some designs, usually earlier and smaller standard gauge locomotives like the GWR 3200 Class and some very large narrow gauge locomotives like the Rio Grande class K-36, have the frame mounted outside the wheels - an "outside frame". Some early rigid-wheelbase diesel shunters had outside frames as well.

== Articulated locomotives ==
An articulated locomotive with no fixed wheels (i.e. excluding the Mallet-type articulated steam locomotive, but including other articulated steam locomotives like Garratts as well as most diesel and electric locomotives) may have a separate frame beneath the superstructure, or the bodywork's internal structure may be load-bearing. Rarely is a true monocoque structure used.

Diesel and electric locomotives with a traditional, full-width body, known as cab units in North America, tend to have their strength in an internal structure. This style of construction is still popular elsewhere, but North American locomotives nowadays are overwhelmingly hood units—with a strong frame beneath the superstructure that carries all the load, and bodywork made of removable panels for easy maintenance. Fully enclosed locomotives are used in some limited applications, mostly for passenger trains. These tend to be cowl units, in which the body is not load-bearing.

== See also ==
- Chassis
- Steam locomotive components
- Underframe
- Rigid-framed electric locomotive
