= Lukens Historic District =

Historic district in Pennsylvania, United States

- U.S. National Register of Historic Places
- U.S. National Historic Landmark District
- U.S. Historic district – Contributing property
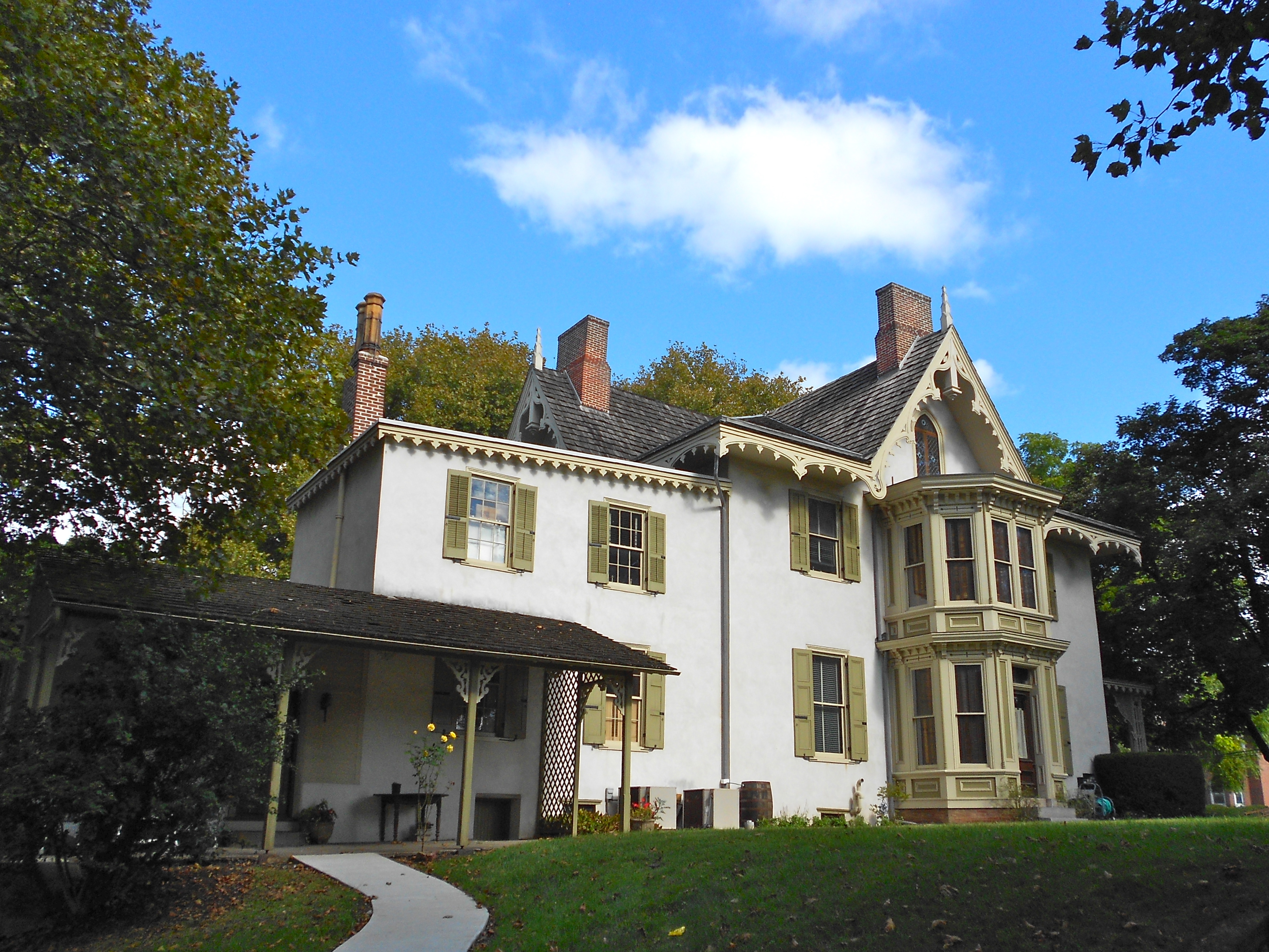
- Terracina, a house in the district

- Location within Pennsylvania Location within the United States
- Location: 50, 53, 76, and 102 S. First St., Coatesville, Pennsylvania
- Coordinates: 39°58′52″N 75°49′21″W
- Area: 3 acres (1.2 ha)
- Built: @1750, 1849, 1889, 1902
- Architect: Cope and Stewardson
- Architectural style: Colonial Revival, Late Gothic Revival, Gothic
- Part of: Coatesville Historic District (ID87000667)
- NRHP reference No.: 94001186

Significant dates
- Added to NRHP: April 19, 1994
- Designated NHLD: April 19, 1994
- Designated CP: May 14, 1987

The Lukens Historic District encompasses four properties in Coatesville, Pennsylvania associated with the 19th and early 20th-century history of the Lukens Steel Company and the family of Rebecca Lukens (1794–1854). Lukens was the first woman to head a major industrial firm in the United States, and played a leading role in the development of the American steel industry. The district was designated a National Historic Landmark District in 1994.

== Description and history ==
The company that became Lukens Steel was established as an iron foundry north of Coatesville by Isaac Pennock, the father of Rebecca Lukens. Rebecca Webb Pennock received a fairly traditional education for women of the early 19th century, and married Dr. Charles Lukens in 1813. Her husband assisted her father in running the business, but both died about a year apart in 1824 and 1825, leaving Rebecca in charge of the business. Although she was engaged in litigation over her ability to fully own the business (a rarity for women of the period), she succeeded, eventually retiring from the business in 1850 and leaving it in the hands of her children. In the records she left behind is evidence of her full knowledge of the operations and finances of the business, and her involvement in its management process, even when men were sometimes the principal actors.

The legacy of Rebecca Lukens is represented in Coatesville by four properties, located on South First Street south of Lincoln Highway. Brandywine, the family homestead where she was raised and lived throughout her life, is at its core a Georgian colonial stone building, which was enlarged both by the family, and by later commercial uses of the Lukens Steel Company. Terracina is a fine example of a Carpenter Gothic country house in the style promoted by Andrew Jackson Downing; it was built by Rebecca Lukens as a gift for her son on the occasion of his marriage. Graystone was built in 1899 by Abram Huston, Lukens' grandson; it is a high-quality example of Tudor Revival design, and until recently housed the offices of the borough of Coatesville. Finally, the Lukens Main Office Building, located across the street from the three houses, is a prominent local example of Georgian Colonial Revival architecture; both it and Graystone were designed by the architectural firm of Cope & Stewardson.

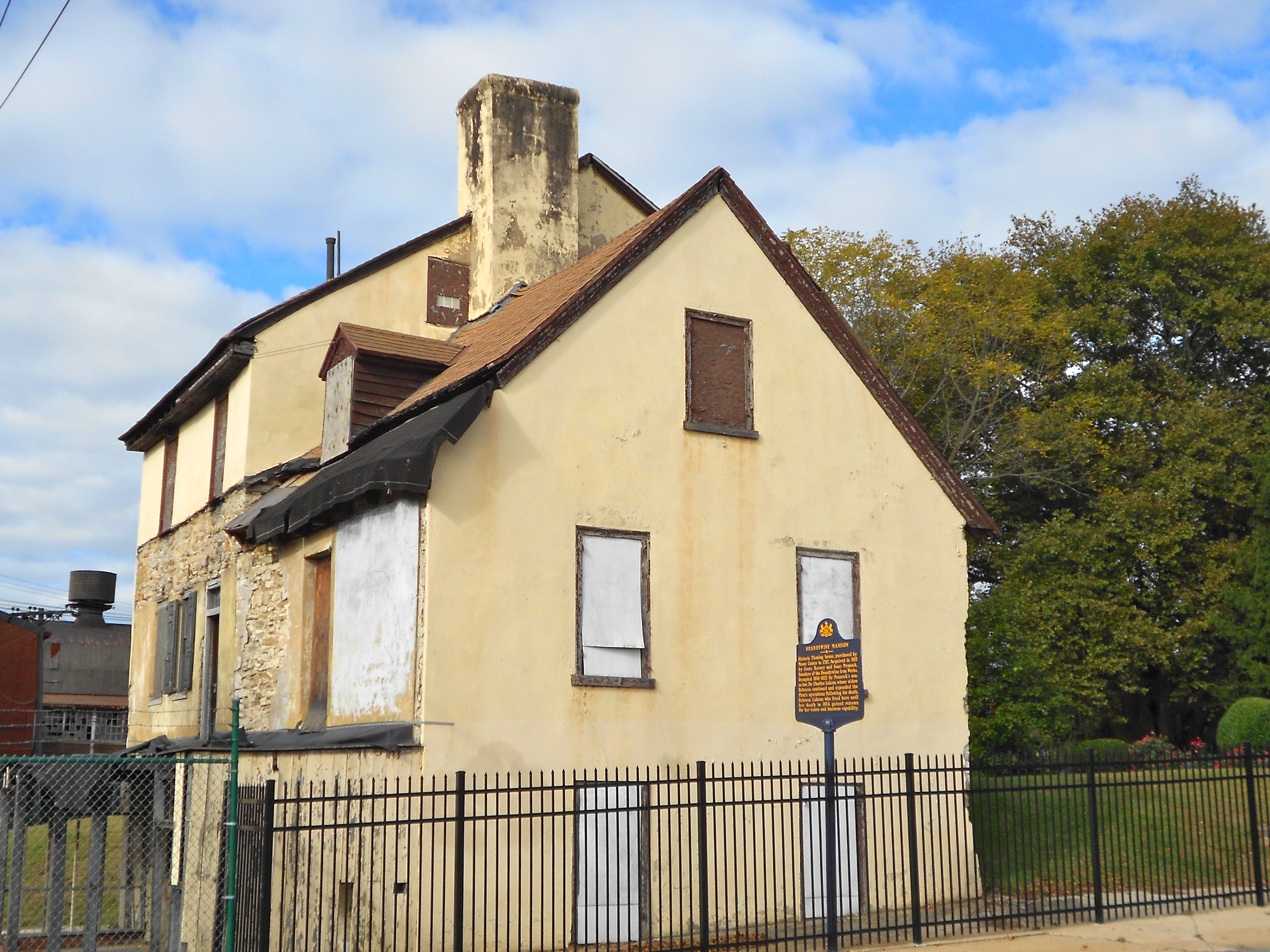
Brandywine Manor

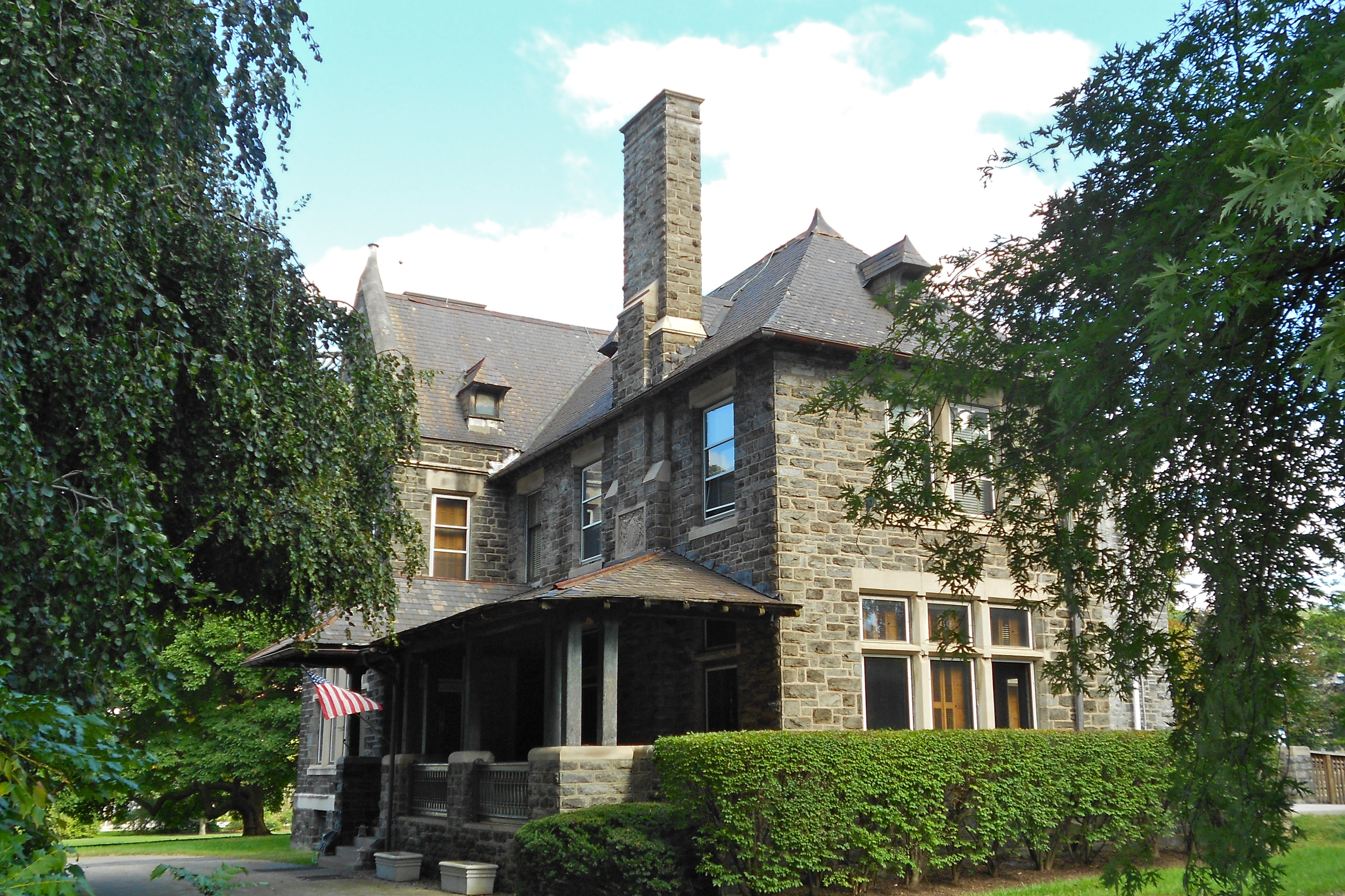
Graystone

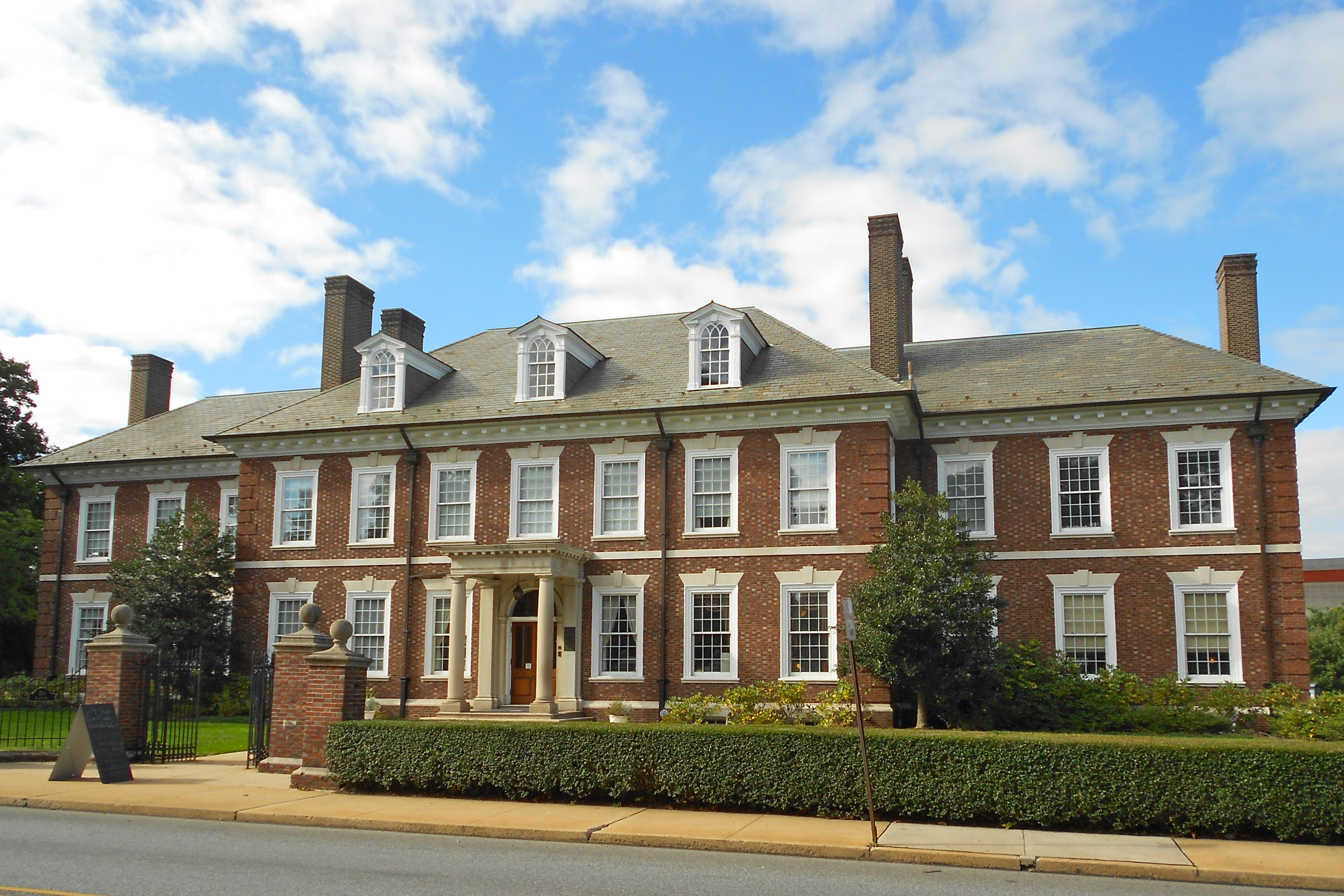
Lukens Main Office Building

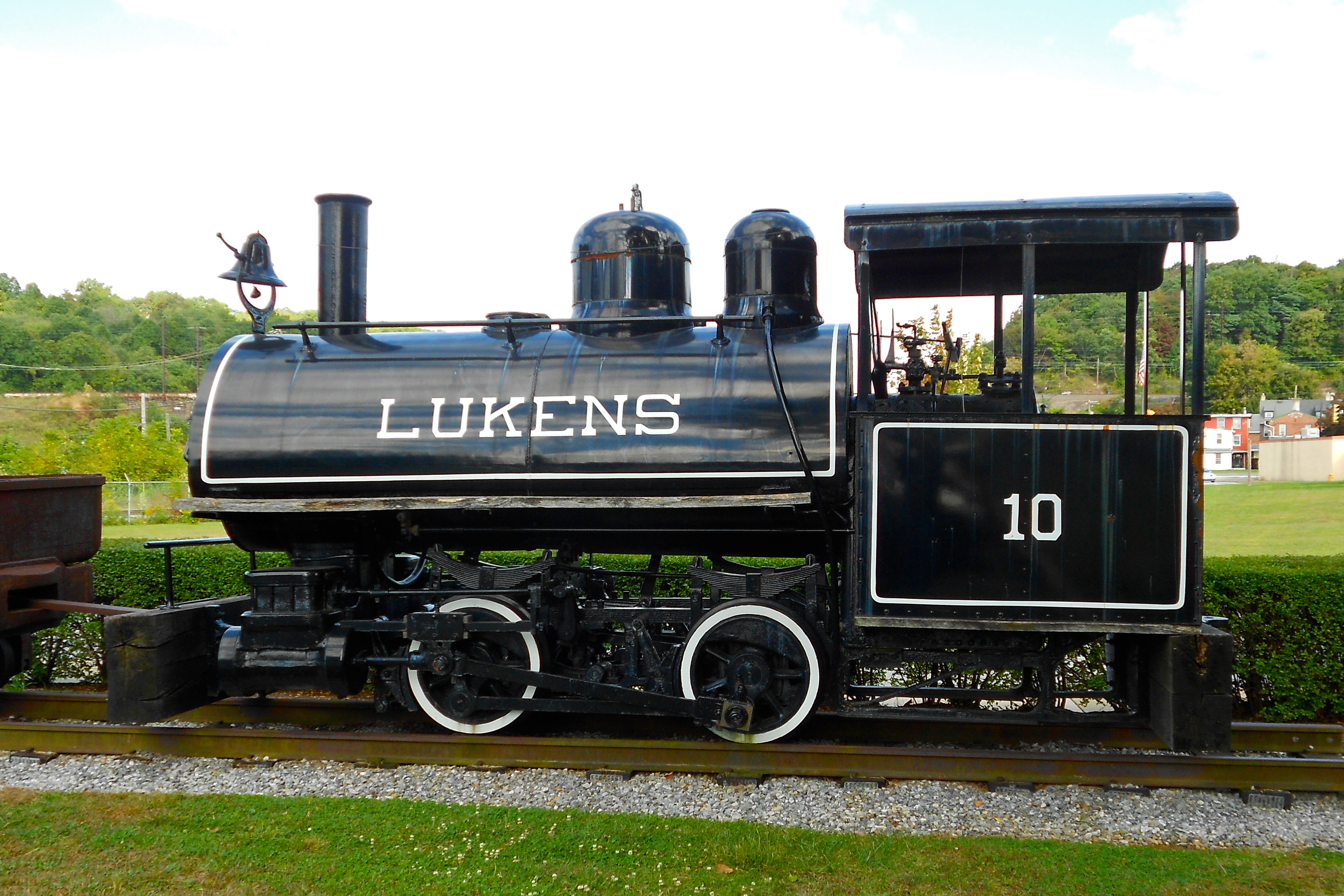
The Lukens #10 steam locomotive located near the Main Office Building

== See also ==
- List of National Historic Landmarks in Pennsylvania
- National Register of Historic Places listings in northern Chester County, Pennsylvania
