= Lukens Main Office Building =

- U.S. National Register of Historic Places
- U.S. Historic district – Contributing property
- U.S. National Historic Landmark District – Contributing property
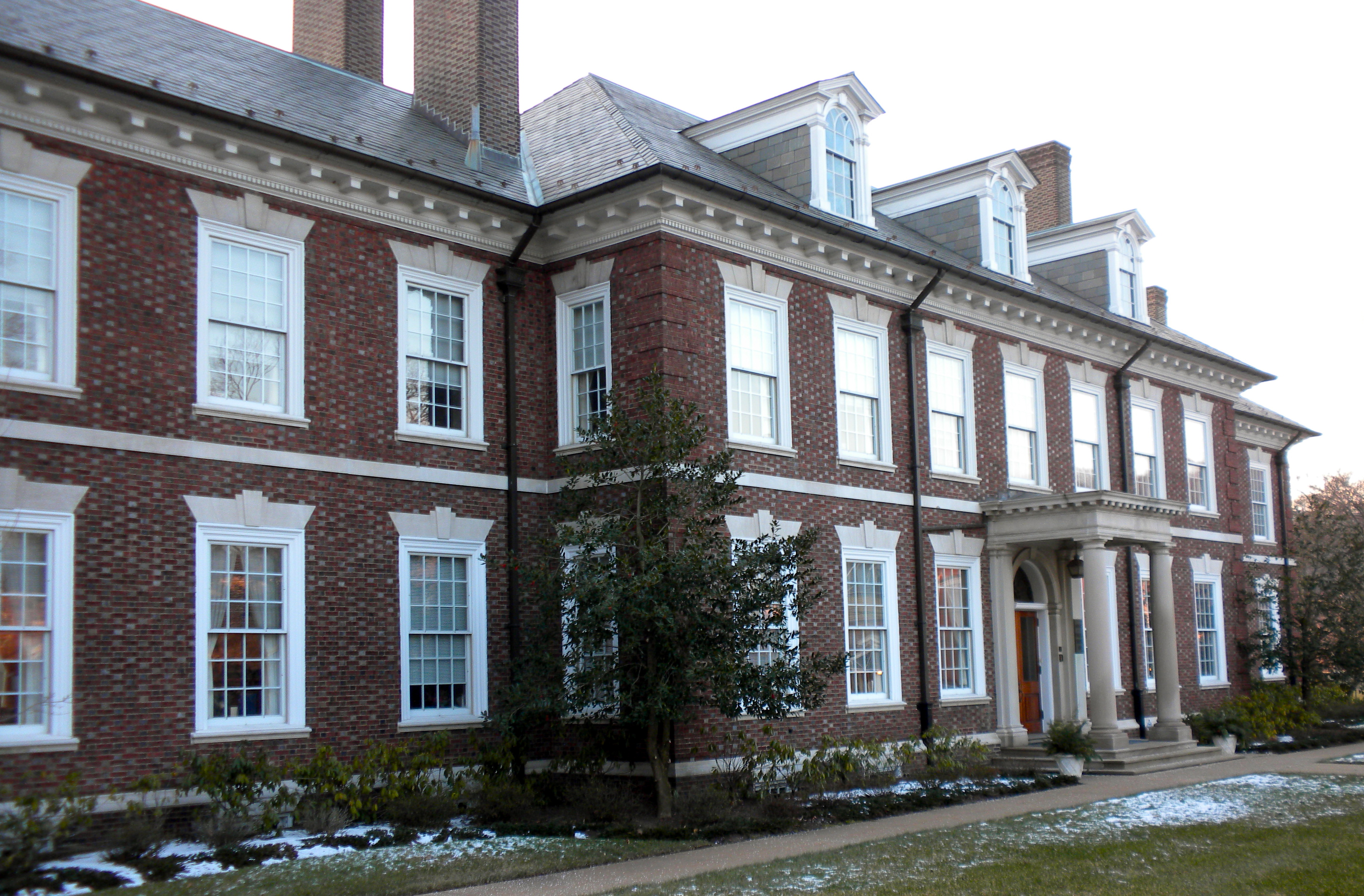
- Lukens Main Office Building, January 2010

- Location within Pennsylvania Location within the United States
- Location: 50 S. 1st Ave., Coatesville, Pennsylvania
- Coordinates: 39°58′54″N 75°49′25″W
- Area: 1.8 acres (0.73 ha)
- Built: 1902, 1916
- Architect: Cope & Stewardson; Page & Stewardson
- Architectural style: Colonial Revival, Georgian Revival
- Part of: Coatesville Historic District; Lukens Historic District (ID87000667; 94001186)
- NRHP reference No.: 76001624

Significant dates
- Added to NRHP: May 24, 1976
- Designated CP: May 14, 1987
- Designated NHLDCP: April 19, 1994

The Lukens Main Office Building is an historic office building which is located in Coatesville, Chester County, Pennsylvania, USA.

It was added to the National Register of Historic Places in 1976.

== History and architectural features ==
The original section of this structure was designed by the architectural firm of Cope & Stewardson and built in 1902, for the Lukens Steel Company. It is a 2 1/2-story, seven-bay, brick, T-shaped building in a Colonial Revival/Georgian Revival style. It has a hipped roof with dormers and flanking two-story, three-bay wings. A duplicate of the original structure was added in 1916, making it an H-shaped building. The addition was designed by the successor firm of Page & Stewardson.

Today, the building is home to the National Iron & Steel Heritage Museum and other local businesses and organizations.
