= Luken (name) =

Luken is a male Basque name, as a form of Lucian or Lucius, and a Dutch surname. Notable people with the name include:

- Charlie Luken (born 1951), American politician
- Jesse Luken (born 1983), American actor, producer, and writer
- Jim Luken (1921–1979), American politician
- Kristine Luken, American murder victim
- Luken Baker (born 1997),American baseball player
- Tom Luken (1925–2018), American politician
- Tom Luken (American football) (born 1950), American football player
- Virgil Luken (1942–2023), American swimmer
- Gastón Luken Garza (born 1959), Mexican politician

== See also ==
- Lukens (disambiguation)
- Lukin
