= Terracina (Coatesville, Pennsylvania) =

Historic house in Pennsylvania, United States

- U.S. National Register of Historic Places
- U.S. Historic district – Contributing property
- U.S. National Historic Landmark District – Contributing property
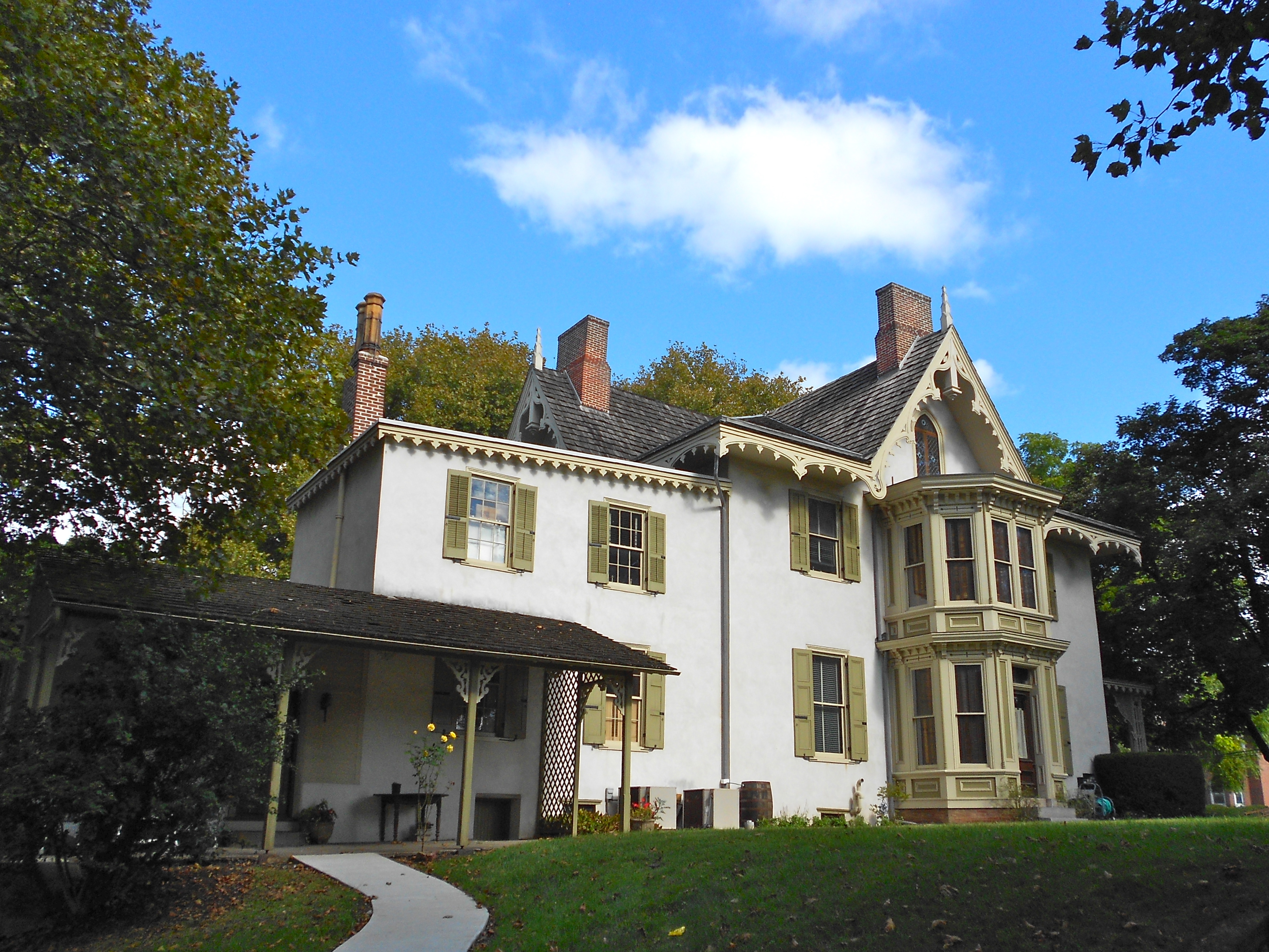
- Terracina, 2013

- Location within Pennsylvania Location within the United States
- Location: 76 S. 1st Ave., Coatesville, Pennsylvania
- Coordinates: 39°58′52″N 75°49′21″W
- Area: 2.1 acres (0.85 ha)
- Built: 1848
- Architectural style: Gothic Revival
- Part of: Coatesville Historic District; Lukens Historic District (ID87000667; 94001186)
- NRHP reference No.: 78002369

Significant dates
- Added to NRHP: December 13, 1978
- Designated CP: May 14, 1987
- Designated NHLDCP: April 19, 1994

Terracina, also known as The Huston House, is an historic home that is located in Coatesville, Chester County, Pennsylvania, United States.

It was added to the National Register of Historic Places in 1978. It is also part of the Lukens Historic District which was listed as a National Historic Landmark in 1994.

== History and architectural features ==
Built in 1848, this historic structure is a 2 1/2-story, stuccoed stone dwelling with a steeply pitched roof. Designed in the Gothic Revival style, it has a two-story, flat-roofed rear wing, and features a full-width, hipped-roof front porch. The house was built as a wedding present by Rebecca Lukens for her daughter Isabella upon her marriage to Dr. Charles Huston.
