= Lukin =

Lukin or Lukins is a surname. Notable people with the surname include:

- Andrey Lukin (born 1948), Russian chess player and coach
- Dean Lukin (born 1960), Australian weightlifter
- Evgeny Lukin (born 1950) Russian writer
- Henry Lukin (1860–1925), South African military commander
- George Lukins (born 1743/1744), Yatton dœmoniac
- Lionel Lukin (1742–1834), English inventor of the life boat
- Lionel Lukin (judge) (died 1944), Australian judge
- Matt Lukin (born 1964), American rock musician (bassist: Melvins, Mudhoney)
- Mikhail Lukin (born 1971) Russian-American physicist
- Robert Lukins, Australian writer
- Sheila Lukins (1942–2009), American cook and food writer
- Vladimir Lukin (born 1937), Russian liberal political activist

Fictional characters:

- Aleksander Lukin, Marvel Comics villain

== See also ==
- Liukin, a Russian language surname sometimes pronounced as "Lukin"
- Luken (name), given name and surname
- Lukens § People, list of people with the surname
