= Rebecca Lukens =

American businesswoman

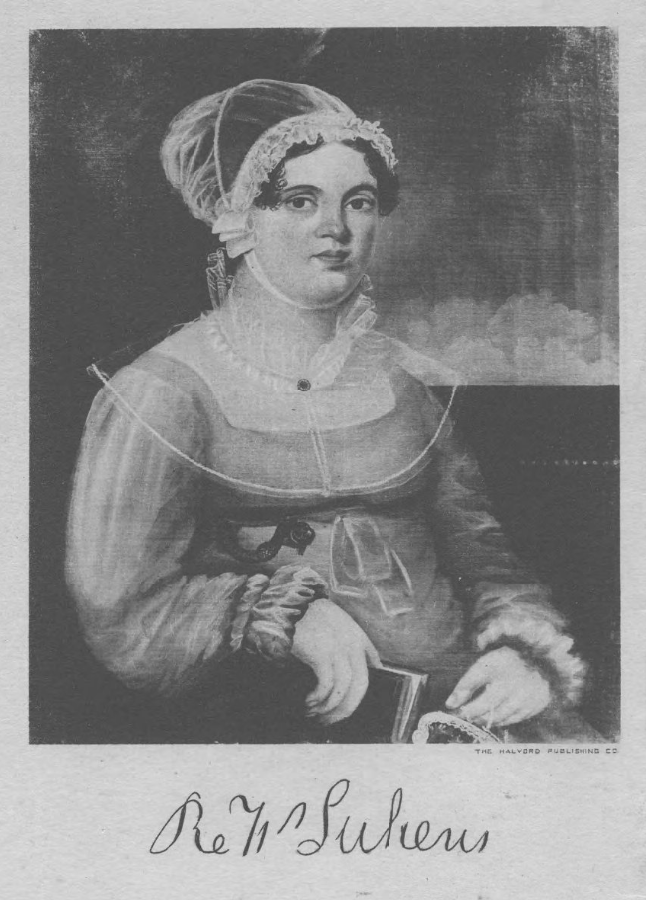
- Born: January 6, 1794
- Died: December 10, 1854 (aged 60)
- Known for: Owner and manager, Lukens Steel Company
- Spouse: Dr. Charles Lukens

Rebecca Lukens (1794–1854), born Rebecca Webb Pennock, was an American businesswoman. She was the owner and manager of the iron and steel mill which became the Lukens Steel Company of Coatesville, Pennsylvania. Fortune Magazine called her "America's first female CEO of an industrial company" and its board of editors named her to the National Business Hall of Fame in 1994.

== History ==
Rebecca was the daughter of Quaker Isaac Pennock who founded the Federal Slitting Mill near Coatesville about 1793. She grew up in the business often accompanying her father in the mill. She went to boarding school first at Westtown School, a nearby Quaker Boarding school, and then at the Wilmington School for Girls in Wilmington, Delaware, where among other subjects, she studied chemistry. The slitting mill processed iron from other mills into barrel hoops and nails. It was called "Federal" in honor of the new constitution. By 1824, when Isaac died, the mill had already passed to Rebecca and her husband, and was known as the Brandywine Iron Works and Nail Factory, after Brandywine Creek which provided the water power for the mill.

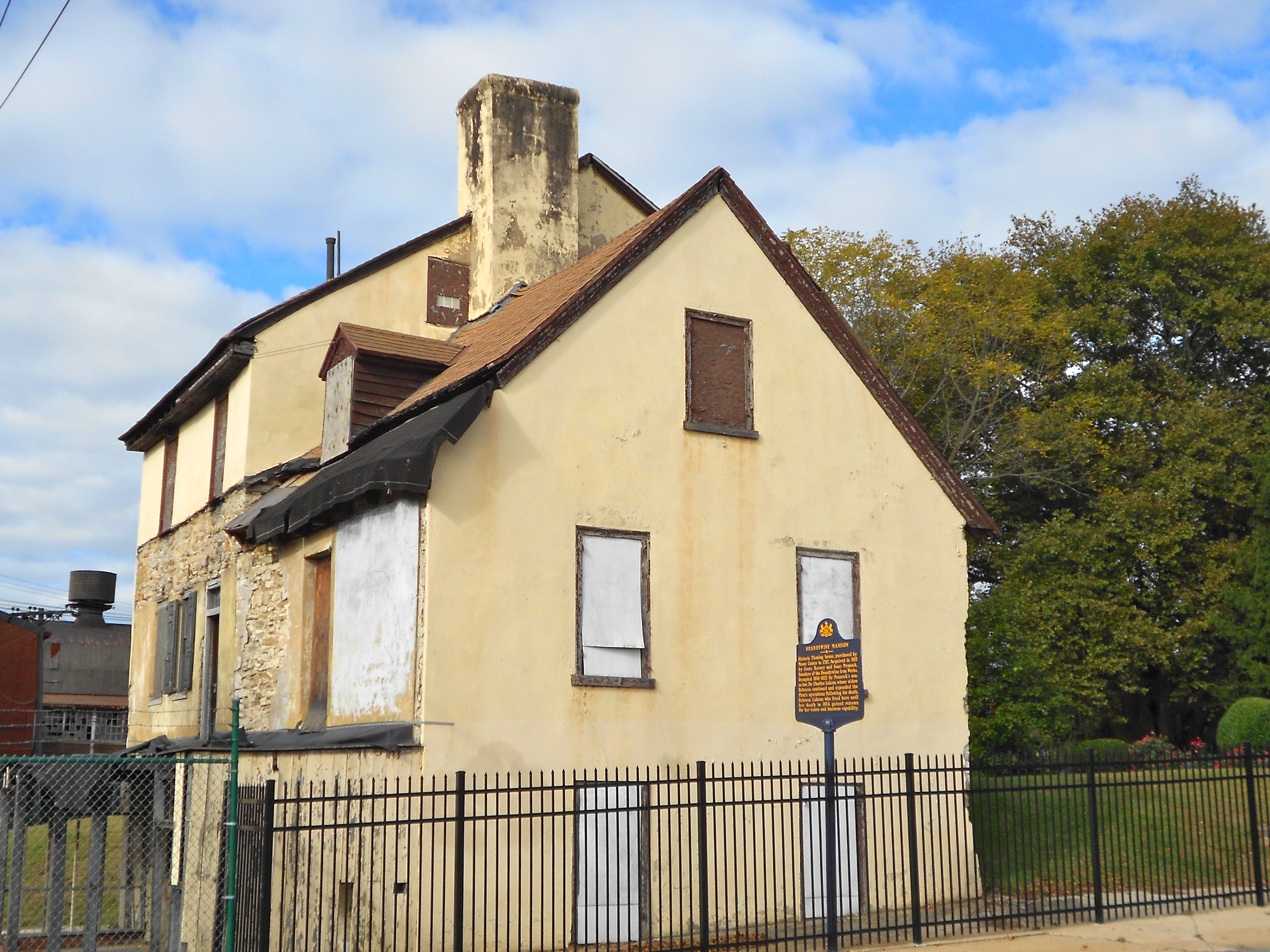
Brandywine Mansion in 2013

She married Dr. Charles Lukens in 1813. He soon entered the iron business, and together the Lukens leased the mill from her father. Starting in 1816 they lived in "Brandywine Mansion," which is now located within the Lukens Historic District. Charles experimented with new products, such as rolled steel plate, in the early 1820s. The steel plate was used to construct the first metal hulled steamboat in America, the Codorus, and was later used as boilerplate in steam engines and locomotives. Charles died in 1825, leaving Rebecca in charge of a company near bankruptcy. An inheritance dispute and the Panic of 1837 further complicated matters.

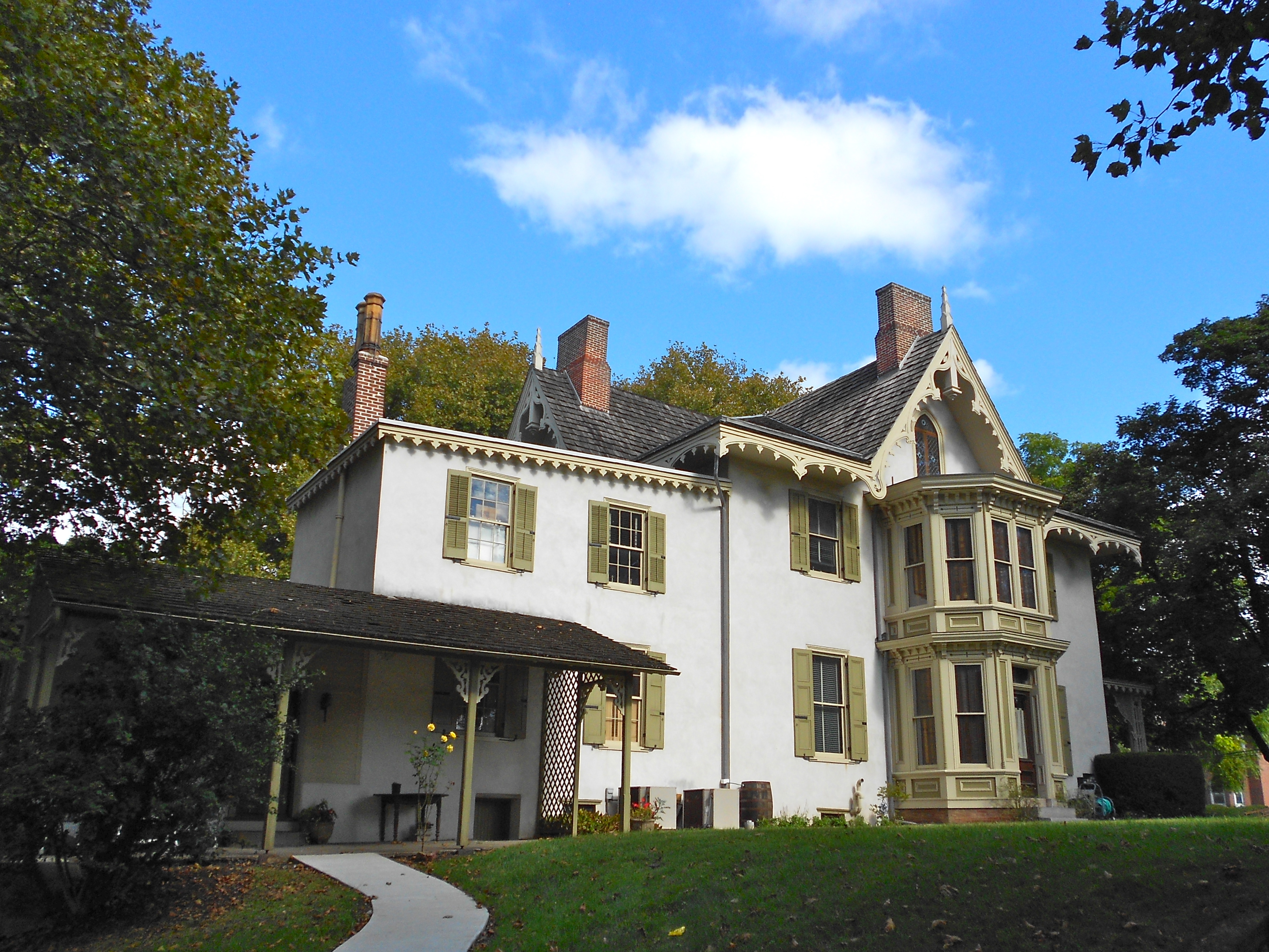
Terracina

She ran the company until 1847, making it into the country's premier manufacturer of boilerplate. During her retirement she wrote an autobiography for her grandchildren. In 1848, she built Terracina as a wedding present for her daughter Isabella upon her marriage to Dr. Charles Huston.

She is buried in Ercildoun, south of Coatesville, in the Fallowfield Orthodox Friends Burying Ground.

== Legacy and honors ==
During World War II the Liberty ship SS Rebecca Lukens was built in Panama City, Florida, and named in her honor.

On January 6, 1994, the 200th anniversary of Lukens' birth, the Pennsylvania Legislature and City of Coatesville declared her "America’s first woman industrialist." The company remained independent until 1997, being ranked number 395 on the FORTUNE 500 industrial list in 1993. As of 1994 the mill was considered the oldest continuously operating steel mill in the U.S. The mill is operating today under Cleveland-Cliffs. In 2020, Lukens was one of eight women featured in "The Only One in the Room" display at the Smithsonian National Museum of American History.

== Letters ==
In March 2015, a cache of at least ten letters were found in the walls of Brandywine Mansion. The letters are awaiting study and after review will be displayed in Coatesville. They contain business correspondence from as far away as Albany, New York.

== See also ==
- Martha Pennock House
- Primitive Hall
