= Liukin =

Liukin (Russian: Люкин), feminine form Liukina (Russian: Люкина) is a Russian surname. Notable people with the surname include:

- Nastia Liukin (born 1989), Russian-born American artistic gymnast
- Valeri Liukin (born 1966), Soviet-born Russian-American artistic gymnast, father of Nastia Liukin
