= Coatesville Historic District =

Historic district in Pennsylvania, United States

- U.S. National Register of Historic Places
- U.S. Historic district
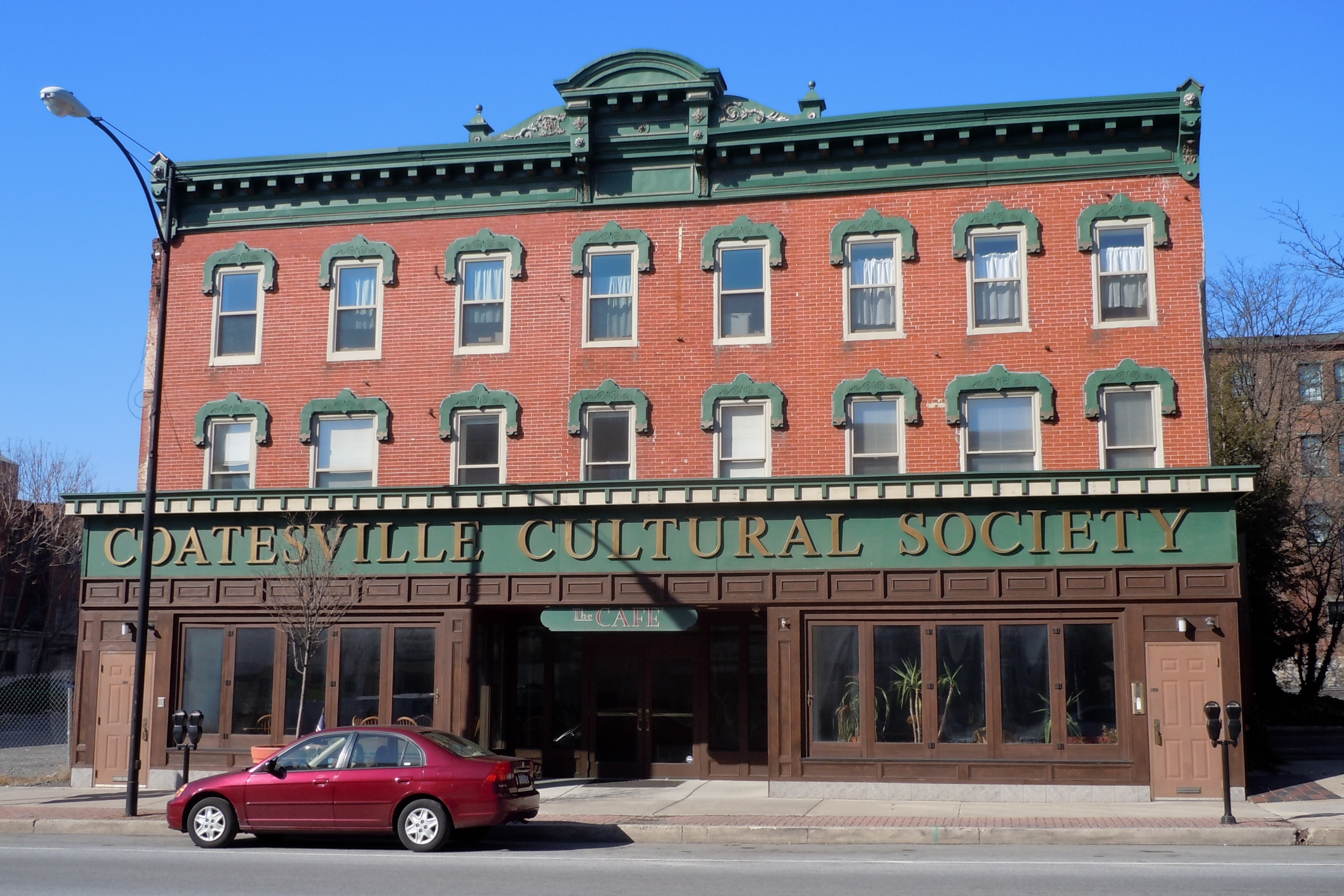
- Coatsville Culture building in the Coatesville Historic District, March 2011

- Location within Pennsylvania Location within the United States
- Location: Roughly bounded by Chesnut St., Sixth Ave., Oak St., Fifth Ave., Harmony St., and First Ave., Coatesville, Pennsylvania
- Coordinates: 39°58′57″N 75°49′04″W
- Area: 115 acres (47 ha)
- Architect: Cope & Stewardson; Et al.
- Architectural style: Late 19th And 20th Century Revivals, Gothic, Italianate
- NRHP reference No.: 87000667
- Added to NRHP: May 14, 1987

Coatesville Historic District is a national historic district located in Coatesville, Chester County, Pennsylvania. The district includes 457 contributing buildings in the central business district and surrounding residential areas of the city of Coatesville. The buildings date from the mid-18th century to 1937, with most built between 1850 and 1924. They are mostly two- and three-story commercial buildings constructed of brick. They include notable examples of the Gothic and Italianate styles. Notable buildings include the Fleming House (c. 1750), Brandywine Mansion (c. 1750), National Bank of Chester Valley (1917), St. Cecelia's Church (1870), Beth Israel Synagogue (1925), and Coatesville High School (1915). The district includes the separately listed Lukens Main Office Building, and "Terracina."

It was added to the National Register of Historic Places in 1987.
