= Steel casting =

Type of manufacturing that pours steel into net or near-net shapes

Steel casting is a specialized form of casting involving various types of steel cast to either final/net or near-net shape. Steel castings are used when iron castings cannot deliver enough strength or shock resistance.

Examples of items that are steel castings include: hydroelectric turbine wheels, forging presses, gears, railroad truck frames, valve bodies, pump casings, mining machinery, marine equipment, turbocharger turbines and engine cylinder blocks.

Steel castings are categorized into two general groups: carbon steels and alloy steels.

== Steel castability ==
Steel is more difficult to cast than iron. It has a higher melting point and greater shrinkage rate, which requires consideration during mold design. Risers should be given more capacity to draw from as the metal cools and shrinks. Attention should be paid to the thickness of mold cavities, as thinner areas will cool quicker than thicker areas, which can create internal stress points that can lead to fracture.

Molten steel is also less fluid than molten iron, making it more difficult to pour and fill intricate gaps in a mold cavity. Molten steel is also more likely to react with internal mold surfaces, making for more unpredictable results.

== Machinability ==
Cast parts often require machining to achieve accurate tolerances and desired surface finishes. Carbon steel is the easiest type of steel to machine. High-carbon steel can be more time-consuming to cut or grind, and will wear tools faster. Low-carbon steel can get gummy, making it difficult to work with. Generally, the presence of alloys used to increase mechanical performance often makes machining more difficult.

== Damping ability ==
Casting is often a valuable means to creating intricate parts used in machine applications where vibration is often a factor. Cast steel typically has a lower damping ability than cast iron, which can lead to excess vibration and noise in the form of ringing or squealing.

== Impact and wear resistance ==
Most steels offer a good balance of strength and ductility, which makes them extremely tough. This allows them to withstand significant stress and strain without fracturing. Steel can also be fairly wear-resistant. Alloy additions can increase both impact and wear resistance.

== Steel casting alloys ==
Alloy steel castings are broken down into two categories: low-alloy steels and high-alloy steels. Low-alloy steels contain less than 8% alloying content and high-alloy steels have 8% or more.

This is a table of some steel casting alloys:

Heat resistant steel castings per ASTM A297-1981
Grade	Nominal alloy composition (%wt)	Tensile strength, minimum		Yield strength to 0.2%, minimum		Elongation, minimum, from 2 in, 51 mm (%)
Grade	Nominal alloy composition (%wt)	(ksi)	(MPa)	(ksi)	(MPa)	Elongation, minimum, from 2 in, 51 mm (%)
HC	28 Cr	55	380	-	-	-
HD	28 Cr, 5 Ni	75	515	35	240	8
HF	19 Cr, 9 Ni	70	485	35	240	25
HH	25 Cr, 12 Ni	75	515	35	240	10
HI	28 Cr, 15 Ni	70	485	35	240	10
HK	25 Cr, 20 Ni	65	450	35	240	10
HL	29 Cr, 20 Ni	65	450	35	240	10
HN	20 Cr, 25 Ni	63	435	-	-	8
HP	26 Cr, 35 Ni	62.5	430	34	235	4.5
HT	15 Cr, 35 Ni	65	450	-	-	4
HU	19 Cr, 39 Ni	65	450	-	-	4
HW	12 Cr, 60 Ni	60	415	-	-	-
HX	17 Cr, 66 Ni	60	415	-	-	-

Corrosion resistant steel castings per ASTM A743-1981a
Grade	Nominal alloy composition (%wt)	Tensile strength, minimum		Yield strength to 0.2%, minimum		Elongation, minimum, from 2 in, 51 mm (%)
Grade	Nominal alloy composition (%wt)	(ksi)	(MPa)	(ksi)	(MPa)	Elongation, minimum, from 2 in, 51 mm (%)
CF-8	9 Cr, 9 Ni	70	485	30	205	35
CG-12	22 Cr, 12 Ni	70	485	28	195	35
CF-20	19 Cr, 9 Ni	70	485	30	205	30
CF-8M	19 Cr, 10 Ni, with Mo	70	485	30	205	30
CF-8C	19 Cr, 10 Ni, with Nb	70	485	30	205	30
CF-16 & CF-16Fa	19 Cr, 9 Ni, free machining	70	485	30	205	25
CH-10 & CH-20	25 Cr, 12 Ni	70	485	30	205	30
CK-20	25 Cr, 20 Ni	65	450	28	195	30
CE-30	29 Cr, 9 Ni	80	550	40	275	10
CA-15 & CA-15M	12 Cr	90	620	65	450	18
CB-30	20 Cr	65	450	30	205	-
CC-50	28 Cr	55	380	-	-	-
CA-40	12 Cr	100	690	70	485	15
CF-3	19 Cr, 9 Ni	70	485	30	205	35
CF-3M	19 Cr, 10 Ni, with Mo	70	485	30	205	30
CG6MMN	Cr-Ni-Mn-Mo	75	515	35	240	30
CG-8M	19 Cr, 11 Ni, with Mo	75	520	35	240	25
CN-7M	20 Cr, 29 Ni, with Co & Mo	62	425	25	170	35
CN-7MS	19 Cr, 24 Ni, with Co & Mo	70	485	30	205	35
CW-12M	Ni, Mo & Cr	72	495	46	315	4
CY-40	Ni, Cr & Fe	70	485	28	195	30
CA-6NM	12 Cr, 4 Ni	110	775	80	550	15
CD-4MCu	25 Cr, 5 Ni, 3 Cu, 2 Mo	100	690	70	485	16
CA-6N	11 Cr, 7 Ni	140	965	135	930	15

== Terminology ==
In present-day vocabulary, the term cast steel is almost always used in its sense referring to steel castings. Between the late 19th and mid 20th centuries, this was not always true, which is worth understanding if one is reading historical documents; see cast steel for details.
