= Lukens Steel Company =

Oldest iron mill in commission within the United States

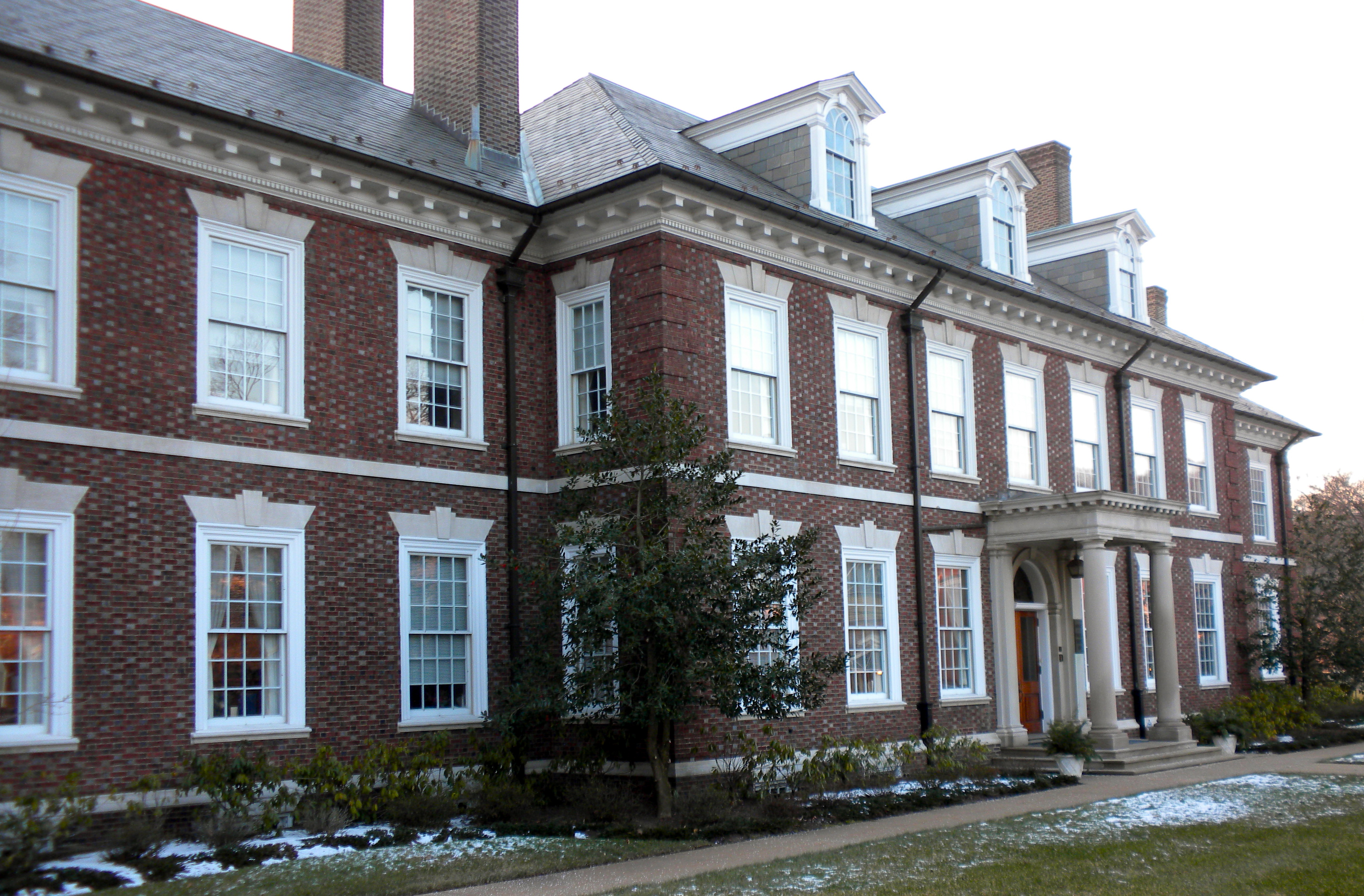
Main Office of Lukens Steel

Lukens Steel Company, located in Coatesville, Pennsylvania, is the oldest iron mill in commission within the United States.

In 1995, it was one of the three largest producers of plate steel and the largest domestic manufacturer of alloy-plate. It is ranked fourth out of 24 public steel corporations in profitability, earning 14.8% equity five years in a row.when? The company produces carbon, alloy, and clad steel plates along with stainless steel sheets, strips, plates, hot bands, and slabs.

== History ==
=== 18th century ===
Isaac Pennock established The Federal Slitting Mill in 1793 on Buck Run, a tributary of Brandywine Creek about four miles south of Coatesville, Pennsylvania.

=== 19th century ===
After receiving a loan in 1810, Pennock went into a partnership with Jesse Kersey to form Brandywine Iron Works and Nail Factory. Kersey's father-in-law was Moses Coates, a member of the founding family of Coatesville. After seven years as partners, Pennock bought Kersey's share of the business and then leased it to his son-in-law, Dr. Charles Lloyd Lukens. The following year the mill became the first in the United States to produce boilerplates and soon joined the shipbuilding industry. In 1818, Lukens produced the iron for the first iron-hull vessel in the United States.

Dr. Charles Lloyd Lukens died in 1825, leaving the steel mill to his wife Rebecca Lukens. This inheritance made Rebecca Lukens the first woman in the United States to be a part of the iron industry. She was also the first female chief executive officer of an industrial company. She became a huge icon for the steel mill when she saved it from bankruptcy by making the company the nation's chief producer of boilerplates. They were sent to England to be used in some of the first railway locomotives.

When Rebecca retired in 1847 she became a silent partner with Abraham Gibbons, who was one of her sons-in-law, and was the sole manager of the mill. The company was known as A. Gibbons and Company. The following year Gibbons took on his brother-in-law, Dr. Charles Huston as a partner. Dr. Huston was also one of Rebecca's sons-in-law. In 1849 the men renamed the mill Gibbons and Huston. Gibbons had married Rebecca's oldest daughter Martha, while Dr. Charles Huston married the youngest Isabella. Not long after, Gibbons left the family business to become a co-founder of The Bank of Chester Valley. After Gibbons left, Isabella took the role as senior partner through her mother's estate. She also bought her sister Martha's share. Huston went on to build a new steam-powered mill in 1870. During 1881 the company started to produce steel and iron and changed the name from Gibbons and Huston to Charles Huston and Sons. After Rebecca died Isabella and Charles changed the name to Lukens Rolling Mill. With all the changes another mill had to be built in 1890 making the company the largest mill in the United States. Within the same year the mill changed from a family partnership to a corporation, converting the name to Lukens Iron and Steel.

Several years later in 1897 Dr. Huston died leaving the company to his sons, Abram Francis Huston who became president of the company and Charles Lukens Huston who became works manager. By 1882 Charles Lukens Huston made it a part of his daily routine to go around the mill and meet all the employees and was proud to be able to greet them by name. He also performed sermons to the men and women that worked and wanted to listen. Sales offices began to open all over, including Baltimore, Boston, Cincinnati, New Orleans and New York City. Not long after the opening the mill became the largest producer of open-hearth steel and steel plates on the Eastern side of the United States.

=== 20th century ===
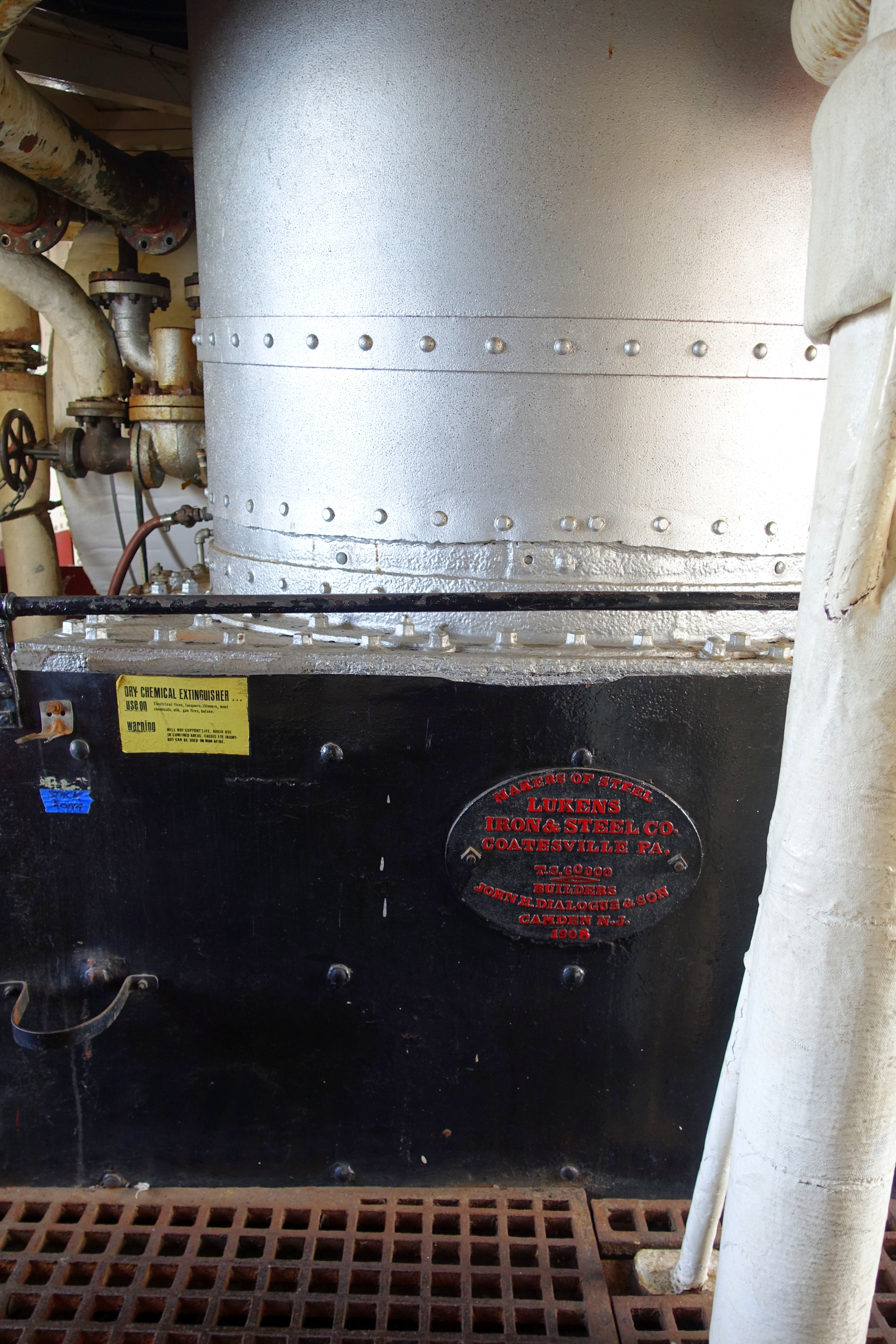
Boiler room, Lukens Iron and Steel Co., 1908

The Lukens Main Office Building was erected in 1902, and later expanded in 1916.

In 1903 Lukens had a new addition put on, a steam-driven mill that produced 136 inch wide steel plates. These were the largest plates being created in the United States. During 1917 the company adjusted the name again to Lukens Steel Company. Continuing through the year Lukens started to produce 204 inch steel plates making it the creator of the world's largest plate. Two years later the plates increased another two inches to 206, securing the mill's stature as producer of the world's plates for over 40 years.

In 1925 Abram Huston's son-in-law, Robert Wolcott, took his place as president of the mill. During World War I the company lost money but returned into good fortune in 1929 with a net income of $876,563 on sales nearing $20.4 million. Wolcott pushed the company through the tough times of The Great Depression. Production rates fell from 446,774 tons to 165,731 tons. Wolcott made a lot of cost reductions, intensive sales, and additional services such as partial fabrications before shipment in attempt to save the company. In 1930 the clad plate, which includes permanent bonding of two or more different metals that protects against rust, corrosion and abrasion, was brought to the production line. This gave Lukens the biggest inclusive line of clad steel in the business.

1937 led to an agreement with the Steel Workers Organization Committee. They accommodated the union members for a compromised agreement pertaining to wages, hours and benefits. By 1940 the company's debt was reduced and it was ready to prepare for the incoming demands of World War II. The U.S. Navy built a finishing mill that Lukens leased and operated to meet the demands. They named a Liberty ship after Rebecca Lukens. When 1944 rolled around the employment reached a record high of 6,166. As the war came to a close the profits hit a new record of $2.8 million, net sales hit $61.5 million and production of steel was at 578,461 tons. In 1949 Wolcott was succeeded by Charles Lukens Huston Jr. making him the 5th generation to own the company.

The greatest production of steel was in 1953 when the mill produced 763,461 tons. Net sales reached $130.5 million and income at $10.2 million in 1957. A year later a new steel producing facility was built surrounding a 100-ton electric furnace. The Coatesville mill now covered 725 acres (293 ha) and 3,250,000 square feet (302,000 m^{2}) of building space.

Lukens supplied the steel beams used in construction of the World Trade Center in New York.

1970 brought completed construction of a $12.8 million strand casting facility that produced steel slabs faster and reduced handling costs. By 1974 production of raw steel reach 958,000 tons and net sales reached $283.4 million. Huston Jr. retired that year ending the family dynasty since 1810. The following year the mill equipped four enormous electric furnaces that phased out the open-hearth furnaces. Economic problems hit the company hard in the late 70's. High energy costs, interest rates, and employment costs as well as competition from other metals and cheap imported material put a decrease on net income from 4.2% to 1.3% and plates sales dropped from 11% to 8%.

W.R. Wilson became president and chief executive officer in 1980. In 1981, Lukens acquired General Steel Industries Inc., a producer of steel, crushing and conveying machinery, reflective highway signs, and protective coats for oil and gas pipelines, for $66 million. The company also bought 3.6 miles of railroad from Conrail called Brandywine Valley Railroad Co. The next year, Lukens would make two small purchases each year and one large every three years with non-steel productions. That same year steel was removed from the name to become Lukens Inc. From January through September 1982 in order to decrease costs the company reduced its work force by 22% and cut employee's pay 10%.

Over the following year the mill lost $14 million putting it back into the red zone for the first time since 1938. Profit came back when Wilson cut costs by $50 million over four years. In order to do so he had to let go of half of the white-collar salaried staff. He was also able to straighten out a thirteen-year lawsuit by agreeing to pay 1,300 black workforce members $2.5 million in reimbursement and arranged to put a target to fill 18% of its hours and salary positions with black workers.

1988 earned a profit of $33.4 million on sales of $605.3 million and Lukens sold Canadian Lukens. The company won the largest single order in history. It consisted of a $74 million contract to supply carbon and military alloy plates over five years to be used in construction of two Nimitz-class nuclear aircraft carriers, at the time the largest warships in the world. By the next year the company hit a record profit of $41.5 million on sales of $644.9 million. Military orders turned the company around once again. The mill supplied alloy plate steel for projects like the Army's Abrams tank and the Navy's Aegis class cruisers, ballistic missiles and submarines.

Around October 1991 a walkout over financial and healthcare issues caused 1,200 plus workers at Lukens to unite at the Coatesville mill. The workers wanted to eliminate contracting out. Nonunion workers were hired to perform duties not directly tied to making steel along with salaried employees kept the mill running. About 85% of the normal production was kept going during the 105-day walkout that ended with the strikers not getting what they wanted.

In 1992, Lukens purchased Washington Steel Corporation for $273.7 million. Washington gave Lukens enough volume to rationalize building a new rolling mill in Conshohocken, Pa adaptable to stainless and carbon products. This system was called Steckel Mill Advanced Rolling Technology (SMART). The SMART technology was able to produce stainless coil plates up to 102 inches when the former limit was 60 inches.

New chairmen and CEO R.W Van Sant sold Flex-O-Light producer of highway safety products, Ludlow-Saylor division, South Central Florida Express, Inc. in 1994 and Energy Coating Co to Dresser Industries Inc in 1995, which brought Lukens $70 million. Producing raw steel from an electric-arc furnace at the Coatesville plant produced 70% of their slabs. The Washington Stainless Group including the Washington Steel Corp's melting, continuous casting and hot-rolling facilities in Houston, Pennsylvania and the rolling and finishing facilities were in Washington, Pennsylvania.

Bethlehem Steel eventually bought Lukens in 1997 for $400 million in cash and stock.

=== 21st century ===
In 2003, International Steel Group Inc (ISG) bought Bethlehem for $1.5 billion. The following year ISG was acquired by Mittal Steel Company for $4.5 billion. In 2006, Mittal Steel and Arcelor merged to form ArcelorMittal.

In early 2015, during the restoration of a home that once belonged to Rebecca Lukens, a trove of business correspondence from 1834 was found inside the walls. Historians have begun studying the letters and fragments to learn more about the company and the state of the commerce that was happening at the time.

On September 28, 2020, Cleveland-Cliffs Inc. entered into a definitive agreement to acquire the United States steel mill interests of ArcelorMittal, including Lukens.

== Name changes ==
- The Federal Slitting Mill
- Brandywine Iron Works and Nail Factory
- A.Gibbons and Company
- Gibbons and Huston
- Charles Huston and Sons
- Lukens Rolling Mill
- Lukens Iron and Steel
- Lukens Steel Company
- Lukens Inc
- Lukens Steel Inc
- Bethlehem Steel
- International Steel Group
- Mittal Steel Company
- ArcelorMittal
- Cleveland-Cliffs

== Industrial accomplishments ==
- Rolled plates for the Codorus (America's first iron-hulled vessel)
- Boilerplates for riverboats in New Orleans
- Boilerplates for Baldwin Locomotives for the Pennsylvania and other Railroads
- Fireboxes for railroad locomotives
- Battleships armor and light tank armor for the Navy
- Steel for the battleship USS New Jersey
- Antiaircraft-gun bases and other fabricated steel parts for the Army
- Keel plates for the aircraft carriers USS Saratoga and USS Forrestal
- Steel for the USS Nautilus (SSN-571) (first nuclear-powered submarine)
- Plates for the hull on flight decks and plane launchers on the USS Enterprise (first nuclear-powered carrier)
- Eyebars to anchor the cables of bridges for the Verrazzano–Narrows Bridge in New York harbor
- Plates for the Throgs Neck in New York City
- Plates for the Walt Whitman Bridge in Philadelphia
- Fabricated materials for the NS Savannah (first atomic-powered commercial ship)
- Arched column supports for New York City's World Trade Center (the only thing left standing after 9/11)
- Steel for ice-crushing bow on the USS Manhattan (largest in the U.S. at its time)
- Two Nimitz-class nuclear aircraft carriers (largest warships in the world)
- Steel for the Coulee Dam
- Steel for the St. Louis Arch
- Steel for the One World Trade Center.
