= Johannes Drost =

Dutch swimmer (1880–1954)

Personal information
- Born: 22 June 1880 Rotterdam, Netherlands.
- Died: 18 September 1954 (aged 74) Rotterdam, Netherlands.

Sport
- Sport: Swimming
- Strokes: Backstroke
- Club: Rotterdamsche Zwemclub
Medal record
Men's swimming
Representing the Netherlands
Olympic Games
Bronze medal – third place	1900 Paris	200 m backstroke

Johannes Drost (22 June 1880 – 18 September 1954) was a Dutch backstroke swimmer and diver who competed in the 1900 Summer Olympics.

He won the bronze medal in the 200 m backstroke event in a time of 3:01.0, narrowly beating compatriot Johannes Bloemen. This was the first swimming medal and the first individual Olympic medal ever for the Netherlands.

Drost also competed at other international competitions. Among others in Antwerp, Belgium, in the week after he competed at the 1900 Summer Olympics, finishing second in te 100 metres backstroke, and won the diving competition.

Drost won in diving and swimming several medals at national championships.
