= Paolo Bussetti =

Italian swimmer

Personal information
- Full name: Paolo Bussetti
- Nationality: Italian

Sport
- Sport: Swimming
- Strokes: Backstroke, freestyle

Paolo Bussetti was an Italian swimmer. He competed in men's 200 metre backstroke and men's 200 metre freestyle events at the 1900 Summer Olympics.
