= United States at the Summer Olympics =

- Flag of the United States
- IOC code: USA
- NOC: United States Olympic & Paralympic Committee
- Medals Ranked 1st: Gold 1,106 Silver 880 Bronze 788 Total 2,774

Summer Olympics appearances (overview)
- 1896; 1900; 1904; 1908; 1912; 1920; 1924; 1928; 1932; 1936; 1948; 1952; 1956; 1960; 1964; 1968; 1972; 1976; 1980; 1984; 1988; 1992; 1996; 2000; 2004; 2008; 2012; 2016; 2020; 2024; 2028

Other related appearances
- 1906 Intercalated Games

The United States of America has sent athletes to every celebration of the modern Summer Olympic Games with the exception of the 1980 Summer Olympics, during which it led a boycott in protest of the Soviet invasion of Afghanistan. The United States Olympic & Paralympic Committee (USOPC) is the National Olympic Committee for the United States.

== Hosted Games ==
The United States has hosted the Summer Games on four occasions, more than any other nation, and is planning to host the fifth:

Games	Host city	Dates	Nations	Participants	Events
1904 Summer Olympics	St. Louis, Missouri	July 1 – November 23	12	651	91
1932 Summer Olympics	Los Angeles, California	July 30 – August 14	37	1,332	117
1984 Summer Olympics	Los Angeles, California	July 28 – August 12	140	6,829	221
1996 Summer Olympics	Atlanta, Georgia	July 19 – August 4	197	10,318	271
2028 Summer Olympics	Los Angeles, California	July 14–30	TBA	TBA	351

== Medal tables ==
=== Medals by Summer Games ===
Host country

Games	Athletes	Gold	Silver	Bronze	Total	Gold medal	Total medal
1896 Athens	14	11	7	2	20	1	2
1900 Paris	75	20	13	15	48	2	2
1904 St. Louis	526	80	85	83	248	1	1
1908 London	122	23	12	12	47	2	2
1912 Stockholm	174	25	19	19	63	1	2
1920 Antwerp	288	41	27	27	95	1	1
1924 Paris	299	45	27	27	99	1	1
1928 Amsterdam	280	22	18	16	56	1	1
1932 Los Angeles	474	41	32	30	103	1	1
1936 Berlin	359	24	20	12	56	2	2
1948 London	300	38	27	19	84	1	1
1952 Helsinki	286	40	19	17	76	1	1
1956 Melbourne	297	32	25	17	74	2	2
1960 Rome	292	34	21	16	71	2	2
1964 Tokyo	346	36	26	28	90	1	2
1968 Mexico City	357	45	28	34	107	1	1
1972 Munich	400	33	31	30	94	2	2
1976 Montreal	396	34	35	25	94	3	2
1980 Moscow	boycotted						
1984 Los Angeles	522	83	61	30	174	1	1
1988 Seoul	527	36	31	27	94	3	3
1992 Barcelona	545	37	34	37	108	2	2
1996 Atlanta	646	44	32	25	101	1	1
2000 Sydney	586	37	24	32	93	1	1
2004 Athens	533	36	39	26	101	1	1
2008 Beijing	588	36	39	37	112	2	1
2012 London	530	48	26	32	106	1	1
2016 Rio de Janeiro	554	46	37	38	121	1	1
2020 Tokyo	615	39	41	33	113	1	1
2024 Paris	592	40	44	42	126	1	1
2028 Los Angeles	future event						
2032 Brisbane	future event						
Total (29/30)	11,523	1,106	880	788	2,774	1	1

Notes

- ^{ART} Art competitions (1912–1948) are not included in the medal table above, as they were non-sports events formerly part of the Olympic Games. (Note: In 1952, art competition medals, as well as the gold medal awards for feats in alpinism and aeronautics, were removed from the official national medal counts. Only since 2021 have they been officially listed again by the IOC in the medal tables and respective National Olympic Committee (NOC) profiles on its website.) The United States won a total of 9 art competition medals (4 gold, and 5 silver), across the 1912, 1932, and 1936 Summer Olympics.
- ^{NAT} Athletes at the early Olympic Games (1896, 1900, and 1904) are attributed by the International Olympic Committee (IOC) according to the national affiliation of their club or team, rather than their nationality. (Note: In 2024, the IOC reinstated its original and current attribution policy for athletes at the early Olympic Games (1896, 1900, and 1904). From 2021 to 2024, the IOC briefly attributed medals in individual events according to the athlete's nationality, even when the athlete represented a foreign club or team. Since 2024, participation and medals have instead been attributed according to the national affiliation of the club or team represented by the athlete.)
  - 1900 Olympic Games:
    Canadian George Orton (CAN) won a gold medal and a bronze medal in athletics; as a representative of an American club, his results were attributed to the United States. Conversely, American Pauline Whittier (silver in golf) represented a Swiss club, while Abbie Pratt (bronze in golf) represented a French club; their medals were therefore attributed to Switzerland and France, respectively.
  - 1904 Olympic Games:
    Austrian Julius Lenhart (AUT) (gymnastics; one gold and one silver), Norwegians Bernhoff Hansen (NOR) and Charles Ericksen (NOR) (wrestling; one gold each), Frenchman Albert Corey (FRA) (athletics; one silver), Australian Francis Gailey (AUS) (swimming; three silver and one bronze), German Frank Kugler (GER) (wrestling and weightlifting; one silver and two bronze), Austrian Otto Wahle (AUT) (swimming; one bronze), and Swiss Gustav Tiefenthaler (SUI) (wrestling; one bronze) represented American clubs, and their results were attributed to the United States.
- ^{MIX} At the 1904 Summer Olympics three team event medals (1 gold, 1 silver, and 1 bronze) won by American clubs competing as mixed teams—composed primarily of American athletes alongside a few non-American participants—were attributed to the United States: gold in the gymnastics team all-around, silver in the 4 mile team race, and bronze in the tug of war team competition.

=== Best results ===
- Gold medals – 83 (1984 Summer Olympics), Olympic record
- Total medals – 231 (1904 Summer Olympics), Olympic record

=== Medals by summer sport ===
Leading in that sport

Sport	Gold	Silver	Bronze	Total
Athletics	359	282	226	867
Swimming	265	194	152	611
Wrestling	59	47	43	149
Shooting	58	34	29	121
Boxing	50	27	41	118
Diving	49	47	46	142
Gymnastics	42	45	42	129
Rowing	34	32	25	91
Basketball	27	2	3	32
Tennis	21	7	13	41
Cycling	20	24	22	66
Sailing	19	23	20	62
Weightlifting	17	17	14	48
Archery	14	11	10	35
Equestrian	11	24	20	55
Beach volleyball	7	2	2	11
Fencing	6	12	19	37
Canoeing	6	6	7	19
Golf	6	2	4	12
Artistic swimming	5	3	2	10
Football	5	2	2	9
Water polo	4	6	6	16
Volleyball	4	4	5	13
Taekwondo	3	2	6	11
Softball	3	2	0	5
Judo	2	4	8	14
Rugby	2	0	1	3
Surfing	2	0	0	2
Triathlon	1	2	2	5
Baseball	1	1	2	4
Roque	1	1	1	3
Tug of war	1	1	1	3
3x3 basketball	1	0	1	2
Jeu de paume	1	0	0	1
Modern pentathlon	0	6	3	9
Skateboarding	0	2	3	5
Sport climbing	0	2	1	3
Polo	0	1	1	2
Lacrosse	0	1	0	1
Marathon swimming	0	1	0	1
Field hockey	0	0	2	2
Breaking	0	0	1	1
Karate	0	0	1	1
Totals (43 entries)	1,106	879	787	2,772

Updated on November 16, 2024

*This table does not include two medals awarded at the 1920 Summer Olympics – one silver awarded in the ice hockey event and one bronze awarded in the figure skating event.

The United States has never won an Olympic medal in the following current summer sports or disciplines: badminton, handball, rhythmic gymnastics, table tennis and trampoline gymnastics.

== Flagbearers ==
Summer Olympics
Games	Athlete	Sport
1908 London	Ralph Rose	Athletics
1912 Stockholm	George Bonhag	Athletics
1920 Antwerp	Pat McDonald	Athletics
1924 Paris	Pat McDonald	Athletics
1928 Amsterdam	Bud Houser	Athletics
1932 Los Angeles	Morgan Taylor	Athletics
1936 Berlin	Al Jochim	Gymnastics
1948 London	Ralph Craig	Sailing
1952 Helsinki	Norman Armitage	Fencing
1956 Melbourne	Norman Armitage	Fencing
1960 Rome	Rafer Johnson	Athletics
1964 Tokyo	Parry O'Brien	Athletics
1968 Mexico City	Janice Romary	Fencing
1972 Munich	Olga Fikotova Connolly	Athletics
1976 Montreal	Gary Hall Sr.	Swimming
1980 Moscow	The United States did not participate	
1984 Los Angeles	Ed Burke	Athletics
1988 Seoul	Evelyn Ashford	Athletics
1992 Barcelona	Francie Larrieu Smith	Athletics
1996 Atlanta	Bruce Baumgartner	Wrestling
2000 Sydney	Cliff Meidl	Canoeing
2004 Athens	Dawn Staley	Basketball
2008 Beijing	Lopez Lomong	Athletics
2012 London	Mariel Zagunis	Fencing
2016 Rio de Janeiro	Michael Phelps	Swimming
2020 Tokyo	Eddy Alvarez	Baseball
2020 Tokyo	Sue Bird	Basketball
2024 Paris	LeBron James	Basketball
2024 Paris	Coco Gauff	Tennis

== Summary by sport ==
=== Aquatics ===
==== Swimming ====
The United States first competed in swimming at the inaugural 1896 Games, with one swimmer in two events winning no medals. The discipline would become a strength of the nation.

Current events

Event	No. of appearances	First appearance	First medal	First gold medal	Gold	Silver	Bronze	Total	Best finish
Men's 50m freestyle	10/10	1988	1988	1988	6	4	2	12	(gold) (1988, 2000 (x2), 2004, 2016, 2020)
Men's 100m freestyle	27/28	1896	1908	1908	14	9	2	8	(gold) (1908, 1912, 1920, 1924, 1928, 1948, 1952, 1964, 1972, 1976. 1984, 1988, 2012, 2020)
Men's 200m freestyle	15/16	1900	1968	1972	3	4	7	14	(gold) (1972, 1976. 2008)
Men's 400m freestyle	26/27	1908	1920	1920	9	6	7	22	(gold) (1920, 1924, 1932, 1936, 1948, 1964, 1968, 1976, 1984)
Men's 800m freestyle	2/2	2020	2020	2020	1	1	0	2	(gold) (2020)
Men's 1500m freestyle	25/27	1908	1920	1920	9	7	6	22	(gold) (1920, 1948, 1952, 1968, 1972, 1976, 1984, 2020, 2024)
Men's 100m backstroke	25/26	1908	1912	1912	15	14	10	39	(gold) (1912, 1920, 1924, 1928, 1936, 1948, 1952, 1976, 1984, 1996, 2000, 2004, 2008, 2012, 2016)
Men's 200m backstroke	15/17	1964	1964	1964	9	8	5	22	(gold) (1964, 1976, 1984, 1996, 2000, 2004, 2008, 2012, 2016)
Men's 100m breaststroke	14/15	1968	1968	1968	4	5	3	12	(gold) (1968, 1976, 1984, 1992)
Men's 200m breaststroke	26/27	1908	1924	1924	5	4	6	15	(gold) (1924, 1948, 1960, 1972, 1992)
Men's 100m butterfly	14/15	1968	1968	1968	8	6	3	17	(gold) (1968, 1972, 1976, 1992, 2004, 2008, 2012, 2020)
Men's 200m butterfly	17/18	1956	1956	1956	10	5	5	20	(gold) (1956, 1960, 1968, 1972, 1976, 1992, 2000, 2004, 2008, 2016)
Men's 200m individual medley	13/13	1968	1968	1968	5	7	4	16	(gold) (1968, 2004, 2008, 2012, 2016)
Men's 400m individual medley	15/16	1964	1964	1964	9	11	2	22	(gold) (1964, 1968, 1978, 1996, 2000, 2004, 2008, 2012, 2020)
Men's 4 x 100m freestyle relay	14/14	1964	1964	1964	11	2	1	13	(gold) (1964, 1968, 1972, 1984, 1988, 1992, 1996, 2008, 2016, 2020, 2024)
Men's 4 x 200m freestyle relay	26/27	1908	1908	1920	17	6	2	25	(gold) (1920, 1924, 1928, 1948, 1952, 1960, 1964, 1968, 1972, 1976, 1984, 1988, 1996, 2004, 2008, 2012, 2016)
Men's 4 x 100m medley relay	16/17	1960	1960	1960	15	1	0	16	(gold) (1960, 1964, 1968, 1972, 1976, 1984, 1988, 1992, 1996, 2000, 2004, 2008, 2012, 2016, 2020)
Men's 10km marathon	4/4	2008	—N/a	—N/a	0	0	0	0	5th (2016)
Mixed 4 x 100m medley relay	2/2	2020	2024	2024	1	0	0	1	(gold) (2024)

Summary by Games

Games	Athletes	Events	Gold	Silver	Bronze	Total
1896 Athens	1	2/4	0	0	0	0
1900 Paris	1	2/7	0	0	0	0
1904 St. Louis	24	9/9	3	3	4	10
1908 London	8	6/6	1	0	1	2
1912 Stockholm	7	6/9	2	1	1	4
1920 Antwerp	22	10/10	8	5	3	16
1924 Paris	26	11/11	9	5	5	19
1928 Amsterdam	23	11/11	6	2	3	11
1936 Berlin	28	11/11	2	3	3	8
1948 Berlin	28	11/11	8	6	1	15
1952 Helsinki	30	11/11	4	2	3	9
1956 Melbourne	28	13/13	2	4	5	11
1964 Tokyo	48	18/18	13	8	8	29
1968 Mexico City	52	29/29	21	15	16	52
1972 Munich	51	29/29	17	14	12	43
1976 Montreal	51	26/26	13	14	7	34
1980 Moscow	0	0/26	0	0	0	0
1984 Los Angeles	43	29/29	21	13	0	34
1988 Seoul	44	31/31	8	6	4	18
1992 Barcelona	40	31/31	11	9	7	27
1996 Atlanta	40	32/32	13	11	2	26
2000 Sydney	48	32/32	14	8	11	33
2004 Athens	43	32/32	12	9	7	28
2008 Beijing	43	34/34	12	9	10	31
2012 London	49	34/34	16	9	6	31
2016 Rio	47	34/34	16	8	9	33
2020 Tokyo	53	37/37	11	10	9	30
2024 Paris	48	37/37	8	13	7	28
Total			251	187	144	582

=== Archery ===
The United States debuted in archery in 1904 at the St. Louis Games. Since the launch of the modern archery program in 1972, the United States has sent athletes to every edition, competing in most of the events since. Their most successful Games in the modern event slate were in Atlanta 1996 with two gold medals, and in Seoul 1988 with three overall medals.

Summary by Games

Games	Athletes	Events	Gold	Silver	Bronze	Total
1900 Paris	0	0/7	0	0	0	0
1904 St. Louis	29	6/6	6	5	5	16
1908 London	1	2/3	0	0	1	1
1920 Antwerp	0	0/10	0	0	0	0
1972 Munich	6	2/2	2	0	0	2
1976 Montreal	4	2/2	2	0	0	2
1984 Los Angeles	6	2/2	1	1	0	2
1988 Seoul	6	4/4	1	1	1	3
1992 Barcelona	6	4/4	0	0	0	0
1996 Atlanta	6	4/4	2	0	0	2
2000 Atlanta	6	4/4	0	1	1	2
2004 Athens	6	4/4	0	0	0	0
2008 Beijing	5	3/4	0	0	0	0
2012 London	6	4/4	0	1	0	1
2016 Rio	4	3/4	0	1	1	2
2020 Tokyo	6	5/5	0	0	0	0
2024 Paris	4	4/5	0	1	1	2
Total			14	11	10	35

Current events

Event	No. of appearances	First appearance	First medal	First gold medal	Gold	Silver	Bronze	Total	Best finish
Men's individual	13/13	1972	1972	1972	5	3	1	9	(gold) (1972, 1976, 1984, 1988, 1996)
Women's individual	13/13	1972	1972	1972	2	0	0	2	(gold) (1972, 1976)
Men's team	9/10	1988	1988	1996	1	3	1	5	(gold) (1996)
Women's team	8/10	1988	1988	—N/a	0	0	1	1	(bronze) (1988)
Mixed team	2/2	2020	2024	—N/a	0	0	1	1	(bronze) (2024)

=== Athletics ===
The United States first competed in athletics at the inaugural 1896 Games; the sport has been a strength of the country ever since. The United States competed in 11 of the 12 athletics events in 1896, with Americans winning 9 of them (not competing in the men's 800 metres, taking second in the men's 1500 metres, and having one runner but no finishers in the marathon).

Games	Athletes	Events	Gold	Silver	Bronze	Total
1896 Athens	10	11/12	9	6	2	17
1900 Paris	43	22/23	16	13	10	39
Total			343	270	214	827

=== Basketball ===
The United States first competed in basketball during the 1936 Games, winning gold. Since then the country has been a perennial podium team, medaling in every event they have played – usually winning gold.

Games	Athletes	Events	Gold	Silver	Bronze	Total
1936 Berlin	12	1/1	1	0	0	1
1948 London	12	1/1	1	0	0	1
1952 Helsinki	12	1/1	1	0	0	1
1956 Melbourne	12	1/1	1	0	0	1
1960 Rome	12	1/1	1	0	0	1
1964 Tokyo	12	1/1	1	0	0	1
1968 México City	12	1/1	1	0	0	1
1972 Munich	12	1/1	0	1	0	1
1976 Montreal	24	2/2	1	1	0	2
1984 Los Angeles	24	2/2	2	0	0	2
1988 Seoul	24	2/2	1	0	1	2
1992 Barcelona	24	2/2	1	0	1	2
1996 Atlanta	24	2/2	2	0	0	2
2000 Sydney	24	2/2	2	0	0	2
2004 Athens	24	2/2	1	0	1	2
2008 Beijing	24	2/2	2	0	0	2
2012 London	24	2/2	2	0	0	2
2016 Rio de Janeiro	24	2/2	2	0	0	2
2020 Tokyo	28	3/4	3	0	0	3
Total			26	2	3	31

Event	No. of appearances	First appearance	First medal	First gold medal	Gold	Silver	Bronze	Total	Best finish
Men's 5-on-5 tournament	19/20	1936	1936	1936	16	1	2	19	(gold) (1936, 1948, 1952, 1956, 1960, 1964, 1968, 1976, 1984, 1992, 1996, 2000, 2008, 2012, 2016, 2020)
Women's 5-on-5 tournament	11/12	1976	1976	1984	9	1	1	11	(gold) (1984, 1988, 1996, 2000, 2004, 2008, 2012, 2016, 2020)
Men's 3x3 tournament	0/1	—N/a	—N/a	—N/a	0	0	0	0	—N/a
Women's 3x3 tournament	1/1	2020	2020	2020	1	0	0	1	(gold) (2020)

=== Cycling ===
The United States first competed in cycling at the 1900 Games, with one cyclist competing; John Henry Lake won a bronze medal in the individual sprint that year.

Games	Cyclists	Events	Gold	Silver	Bronze	Total
1900 Paris	1	2/3	0	0	1	1
Total			17	22	21	60

=== Fencing ===
The United States first competed in fencing at the 1900 Games, with 3 fencers each competing in a different event; none advanced past the quarterfinals.

Games	Fencers	Events	Gold	Silver	Bronze	Total
1900 Paris	3	3/7	0	0	0	0
Total			4	11	18	33

=== Football ===
The United States sent two of the three teams to compete in football for the 1904 Games. They wouldn't medal again until the inaugural women's tournament during the 1996 Games. Since then, the women's team has come to dominate the medal count for football.

Games	Teams	Events	Gold	Silver	Bronze	Total
1904 St. Louis	2	1/1	0	1	1	2
1924 Paris	1	1/1	0	0	0	0
1928 Amsterdam	1	1/1	0	0	0	0
1936 Berlin	1	1/1	0	0	0	0
1948 London	1	1/1	0	0	0	0
1952 Helsinki	1	1/1	0	0	0	0
1956 Melbourne	1	1/1	0	0	0	0
1972 Munich	1	1/1	0	0	0	0
1984 Los Angeles	1	1/1	0	0	0	0
1988 Seoul	1	1/1	0	0	0	0
1992 Barcelona	1	1/1	0	0	0	0
1996 Atlanta	2	2/2	1	0	0	1
2000 Sydney	2	2/2	0	1	0	1
2004 Athens	1	1/2	1	0	0	1
2008 Beijing	2	2/2	1	0	0	1
2012 London	1	1/2	1	0	0	1
2016 London	1	1/2	0	0	0	0
2020 Tokyo	1	1/2	0	0	1	1
Total			4	2	2	8

Event	No. of appearances	First appearance	First medal	First gold medal	Gold	Silver	Bronze	Total	Best finish
Men's tournament	14/27	1904	1904	—N/a	0	1	1	2	(silver) (1904)
Women's tournament	7/7	1996	1996	1996	4	1	1	6	(gold) (1996, 2004, 2008, 2012)

=== Golf ===
The United States has competed at all three editions of Olympic golf tournaments, including all 6 specific events. At the 1900 Games, Americans took gold in both the men's and women's individual events, with the United States women sweeping the medals. In 1904, the men's team event featured only three American teams, resulting in a guaranteed sweep; on the men's individual side, American golfers took silver and bronze. When golf returned in 2016, the United States had four men and three women compete in their respective individual events, with Matt Kuchar earning bronze.

Games	Players	Events	Gold	Silver	Bronze	Total
1900 Paris	4	2/2	2	1	1	4
1904 St. Louis	74	2/2	1	2	3	6
2016 Rio de Janeiro	7	2/2	0	0	1	1
2020 Tokyo	8	2/2	2	0	0	2
Total			5	3	5	13

Event	No. of appearances	First appearance	First medal	First gold medal	Gold	Silver	Bronze	Total	Best finish
Men's individual	4/4	1900	1900	1900	2	1	3	6	(gold) (1900, 2020)
Women's individual	3/3	1900	1900	1900	2	1	1	4	(gold) (1900, 2020)
Team	1/1	1904	1904	1904	1	1	1	3	(gold) (1904)

=== Polo ===
The United States competed at three of the five editions of Olympic polo tournaments, including the first in 1900 as well as in 1920 and 1924. The nation is formally credited with a silver medal (1924) and a bronze medal (1920), though American players competed on mixed teams in 1900 (along with British players) that took gold and silver that Games. Competing as a national team in 1920 and 1924, the Americans had an overall record of 4–2: losing a semifinal match in 1920 before winning the bronze medal game, then going 3–1 in the round-robin in 1924. The mixed teams in 1900 went 3–0 and 1–1 (with the loss being to the other mixed team).

Games	Players	Events	Gold	Silver	Bronze	Total
1900 Paris	3	1/1	0	0	0	0
1920 Antwerp	4	1/1	0	0	1	1
1924 Paris	4	1/1	0	1	0	1
Total			0	1	1	2

=== Rowing ===
The United States was one of the nations competing in the first Olympic rowing competitions in 1900, sending an eight crew and winning gold. As of the end of the 2016 Games, the United States is tied with now-defunct East Germany for most gold medals in the sport at 33; the United States leads in total medals with 89 (next closest is Great Britain with 68). Of the 33 American golds, 12 have come from the men's eight, including 8 consecutive from 1920 to 1956.

Games	No. Rowers	Events	Gold	Silver	Bronze	Total	Ranking
1896 Athens	Event wasn't held						
1900 Paris	9	1/5	1	0	0	1	3=
1904 St Louis	37	(14)/5 /	5	4	4	13	1
1908 London	0	0/5	0	0	0	0	
1912 Stockholm	0	0/4	0	0	0	0	
1916	Games Cancelled						
1920 Antwerp	17	4/5	3	1	0	4	1
1924 Paris	11	4/7	2	1	2	5	1
1928 Amsterdam	26	7/7	2	2	1	5	1
1932 Los Angeles	26	7/7	3	1	0	4	1
1936 Berlin	26	7/7	1	0	1	2	3
1940	Games Cancelled						
1944	Games Cancelled						
1948 London	26	7/7	2	0	1	3	2
1952 Helsinki	26	7/7	2	0	1	3	1
1956 Melbourne	26	7/7	3	2	1	6	1
1960 Rome	26	7/7	1	0	1	2	3=
1964 Tokyo	26	7/7	2	1	1	4	1
1968 Mexico City	26	7/7	0	1	1	2	7
1972 Munich	26	7/7	0	1	0	1	6=
1976 Montreal	55	14/14	0	2	1	3	6
1980 Moscow	0	0/14	0	0	0	0	
1984 Los Angeles	54	14/14	2	5	1	8	2
1988 Seoul	53	14/14	0	2	1	3	7=
1992 Barcelona	52	14/14	0	2	1	3	6
1996 Atlanta	46	13/14	0	3	1	4	11
2000 Sydney	48	14/14	0	1	2	3	12
2004 Athens	45	12/14	1	1	0	2	5=
2008 Beijing	46	13/14	1	1	1	3	4
2012 London	44	12/14	1	0	2	3	6
2016 Rio	41	11/14	1	1	0	2	6
2020 Tokyo	37	9/14	0	0	0	0	
2024 Paris	42	12/14	1	0	1	2	5=
2028 Los Angeles							
Total	897	264	34	32	25	91	1

=== Sailing ===
The United States was one of the nations competing in the first Olympic sailing competitions in 1900. Does not include a bronze medal as part of a mixed team in 1900.

Games	Sailors	Events	Gold	Silver	Bronze	Total	Ranking
1900	16	4/13	0	0	2	2	7
1908	0	0/4	0	0	0	0	
1912	0	0/4	0	0	0	0	
1920	0	0/14	0	0	0	0	
1924	0	0/3	0	0	0	0	
1928	11	3/3	0	0	0	0	
1932	22	4/4	2	1	0	3	1
1936	14	4/4	0	0	0	0	
1948	16	5/5	2	1	1	4	1
1952	16	5/5	2	1	0	3	1
1956	13	5/5	1	0	1	2	3
1960	11	5/5	1	0	1	2	3
1964	11	5/5	0	2	3	5	6
1968	11	5/5	2	0	0	2	1
1972	13	6/6	1	0	2	3	4
1976	12	6/6	0	2	1	3	6
1980	0	0/6	0	0	0	0	
1984	13	7/7	3	4	0	7	1
1988	15	8/8	1	2	2	5	2
1992	17	10/10	1	6	2	9	3
1996	16	10/10	0	0	2	2	18
2000	18	11/11	1	2	1	4	4
2004	18	11/11	1	1	0	2	4
2008	18	11/11	1	1	0	2	3
2012	16	10/10	0	0	0	0	
2016	15	10/10	0	0	1	1	13
2020	13	9/10	0	0	0	0	
2024		/10	0	0	1	1	16=
2028							
Total			19	23	20	62	2

=== Shooting ===
The United States competed in shooting at the inaugural 1896 Games, winning two of the three events entered. The Americans have won more than twice as many gold medals as any other nation in the sport (54 to China's 22).

Games	Shooters	Events	Gold	Silver	Bronze	Total
1896 Athens	3	3/5	2	1	0	3
Total			57	31	28	116

=== Skateboarding ===
Games	Athletes	Events	Gold	Silver	Bronze	Total	Ranking
2020 Tokyo	10	4/4	0	0	2	2	4
Total			0	0	2	2	4

Event	No. of appearances	First appearance	First medal	First gold medal	Gold	Silver	Bronze	Total	Best finish
Men's park	1/1	2020	2020	—N/a	0	0	1	1	(bronze) (2020)
Women's park	1/1	2020	—N/a	—N/a	0	0	0	0	6th (2020)
Men's street	1/1	2020	2020	—N/a	0	0	1	1	(bronze) (2020)
Women's street	1/1	2020	—N/a	—N/a	0	0	0	0	4th (2020)

=== Sport climbing ===
Games	Athletes	Events	Gold	Silver	Bronze	Total
2020 Tokyo	4	2/2	0	1	0	1
Total			0	1	0	1

Event	No. of appearances	First appearance	First medal	First gold medal	Gold	Silver	Bronze	Total	Best finish
Men's combined	1/1	2020	2020	—N/a	0	1	0	1	(silver) (2020)
Women's combined	1/1	2020	—N/a	—N/a	0	0	0	0	5th (2020)

=== Surfing ===
Surfing was introduced as an Olympic sport for the 2020 Games, and the United States sent 4 surfers (2 men and 2 women) to compete, winning gold in women's shortboard.

Games	Surfers	Events	Gold	Silver	Bronze	Total
2020 Tokyo	4	2/2	1	0	0	1
Total			1	0	0	1

Event	No. of appearances	First appearance	First medal	First gold medal	Gold	Silver	Bronze	Total	Best finish
Men's shortboard	1/1	2020	—N/a	—N/a	0	0	0	0	QF (2020)
Women's shortboard	1/1	2020	2020	2020	1	0	0	1	(gold) (2020)

=== Tennis ===
The United States first competed in tennis at the 1900 Games, with 5 players (3 men and 2 women) earning a silver and two bronze medals, though the silver and one of the bronzes were part of mixed teams and thus not credited to the United States.

Games	Athletes	Events	Gold	Silver	Bronze	Total
1900 Paris	5	4/4	0	0	1	1
1904 St. Louis	43	2/2	2	2	4	8
1912 Stockholm	1	1/8	0	0	0	0
1924 Paris	9	5/5	5	1	0	6
1988 Seoul	7	4/4	2	1	2	5
1992 Barcelona	7	4/4	2	0	1	3
1996 Atlanta	7	4/4	3	0	0	3
2000 Sydney	10	4/4	2	0	1	3
2004 Athens	10	4/4	0	1	0	1
2008 Beijing	10	4/4	1	0	1	2
2012 London	12	5/5	3	0	1	4
2016 Rio de Janeiro	11	5/5	1	1	1	3
2020 Tokyo	11	5/5	0	0	0	0
2024 Paris	11	5/5	0	1	1	2
Total			21	7	13	41

Event	No. of appearances	First appearance	First medal	First gold medal	Gold	Silver	Bronze	Total	Best finish
Men's singles	13/16	1900	1904	1904	3	2	0	5	(gold) (1904, 1924, 1996)
Men's doubles	12/16	1900	1904	1904	4	1	3	8	(gold) (1904, 1924, 1988, 2012)
Women's singles	11/14	1900	1900	1924	5	0	2	7	(gold) (1924, 1992, 1996, 2000, 2012)
Women's doubles	10/11	1924	1924	1924	7	0	0	7	(gold) (1924, 1988, 1992, 1996, 2000, 2008, 2012)
Mixed doubles	5/8	1900	1924	1924	2	0	1	3	(gold) (1924, 2016)

=== Volleyball ===
The United States did not medal in volleyball until the 1984 Games, winning gold and silver in the men's and women's tournament, respectively. The US has proven to be a powerhouse in beach volleyball, which was added as a discipline during the 1996 Games.

Games	Teams	Events	Gold	Silver	Bronze	Total
1964 Tokyo	2	2/2	0	0	0	0
1968 Mexico City	2	2/2	0	0	0	0
1984 Los Angeles	2	2/2	1	1	0	2
1988 Seoul	2	2/2	1	0	0	1
1992 Barcelona	2	2/2	0	0	2	2
1996 Atlanta	8	4/4	1	1	0	2
2000 Sydney	6	4/4	1	0	0	1
2004 Athens	6	4/4	1	0	1	2
2008 Beijing	6	4/4	3	1	0	4
2012 London	6	4/4	1	2	0	3
2016 Rio de Janeiro	6	4/4	0	0	3	3
2020 Tokyo	6	4/4	2	0	0	2
Total			11	5	6	22

Event	No. of appearances	First appearance	First medal	First gold medal	Gold	Silver	Bronze	Total	Best finish
Men's indoor tournament	12/15	1984	1984	1984	3	0	2	5	(gold) (1984, 1988, 2008)
Women's indoor tournament	12/15	1984	1984	2020	1	3	2	6	(gold) (2020)
Men's beach tournament	7/7	1996	1996	1996	3	1	0	4	(gold) (1996, 2000, 2008)
Women's beach tournament	7/7	1996	1996	1996	4	1	2	7	(gold) (2004. 2008, 2012, 2020)

== History ==
=== Early Olympics (1896–1912) ===
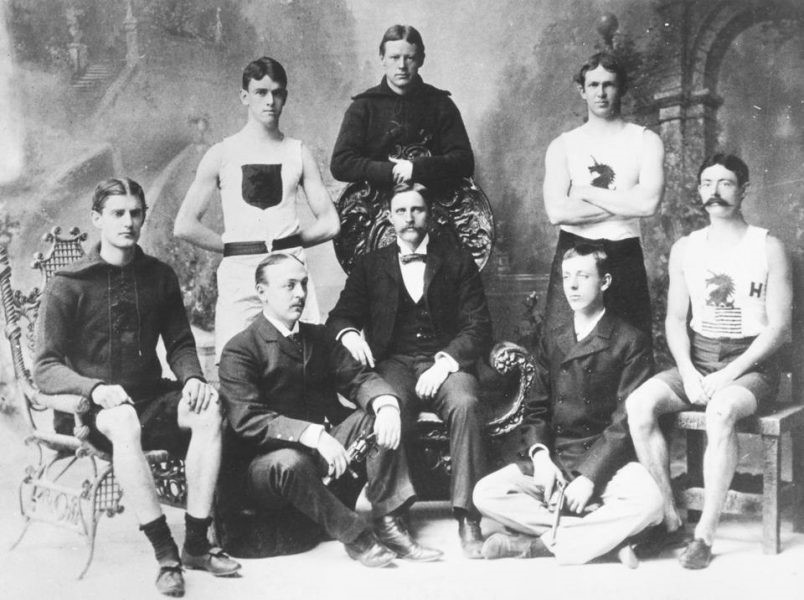
Several members of America's first Olympic team in 1896. Standing: T.E. Burke, Thomas P. Curtis, Ellery H. Clark. Seated: W.W. Hoyt, Sumner Paine, trainer John Graham, John B. Paine, Arthur C. Blake.

The first modern Olympic Games, held in Athens, Greece, saw the Americans fielding 14 athletes that competed in three sports. The hosts, on the other hand, had 169 athletes competing and won 46 medals. The American team managed to win only 20 medals, dwarfed by the enormous Greek team. However, the United States managed to win 11 gold medals, edging out Greece, who secured 10 golds, and allowing Team USA to finish first in the gold medal tally. James Connolly became the first modern Olympic champion by winning the triple jump, and Thomas Burke won three gold medals in various track events, assuming the title of the most successful athlete of the 1896 Games. Robert Garrett won two gold medals in the discus throw and shot put events, demonstrating American strength in athletics.

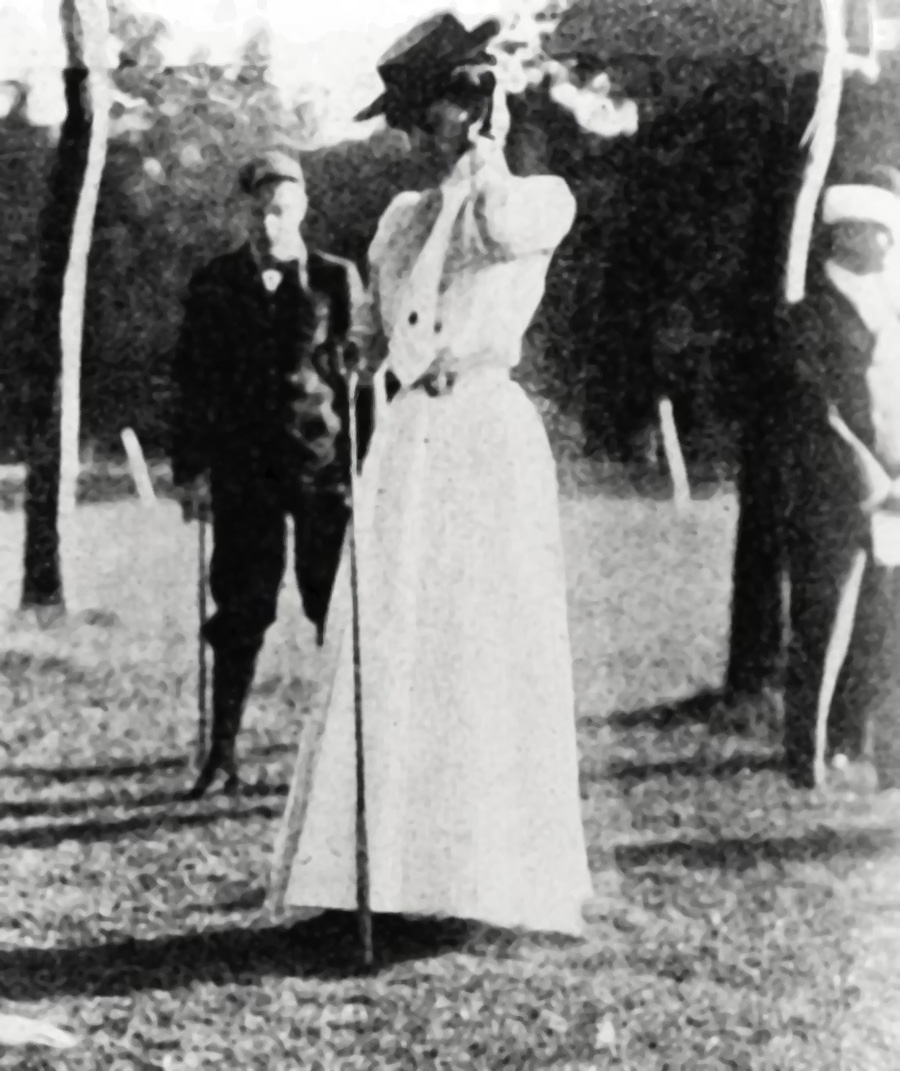
Margaret Abbott competing in golf. Abbott was the first American woman to win an Olympic event.

At the 1900 Paris Olympics, the U.S. team featured 75 athletes, a significant increase compared to 1896, but still considerably less than the French hosts, who fielded 720 competitors. The most notable of all American participants was Margaret Abbott, who became the first female American Olympic champion by winning the women's golf. The vast majority of American medals were won in the sport of athletics, where US athletes clinched 16 golds and 39 medals overall. Alvin Kraenzlein made significant contributions, winning four gold medals in track and field events. Ray Ewry won three gold medals in standing jumps (standing high jump, standing long jump, and standing triple jump) and Walter Tewksbury won two gold medals (400m hurdles and 200m hurdles) and a silver medal (60m). Team USA won only 8 medals outside of athletics, four of them in golf. Overall, France dominated the medal standings, winning 29 gold and 112 total medals. The United States ranked second with 19 and 48, respectively, showing great efficiency, despite having significantly fewer athletes.

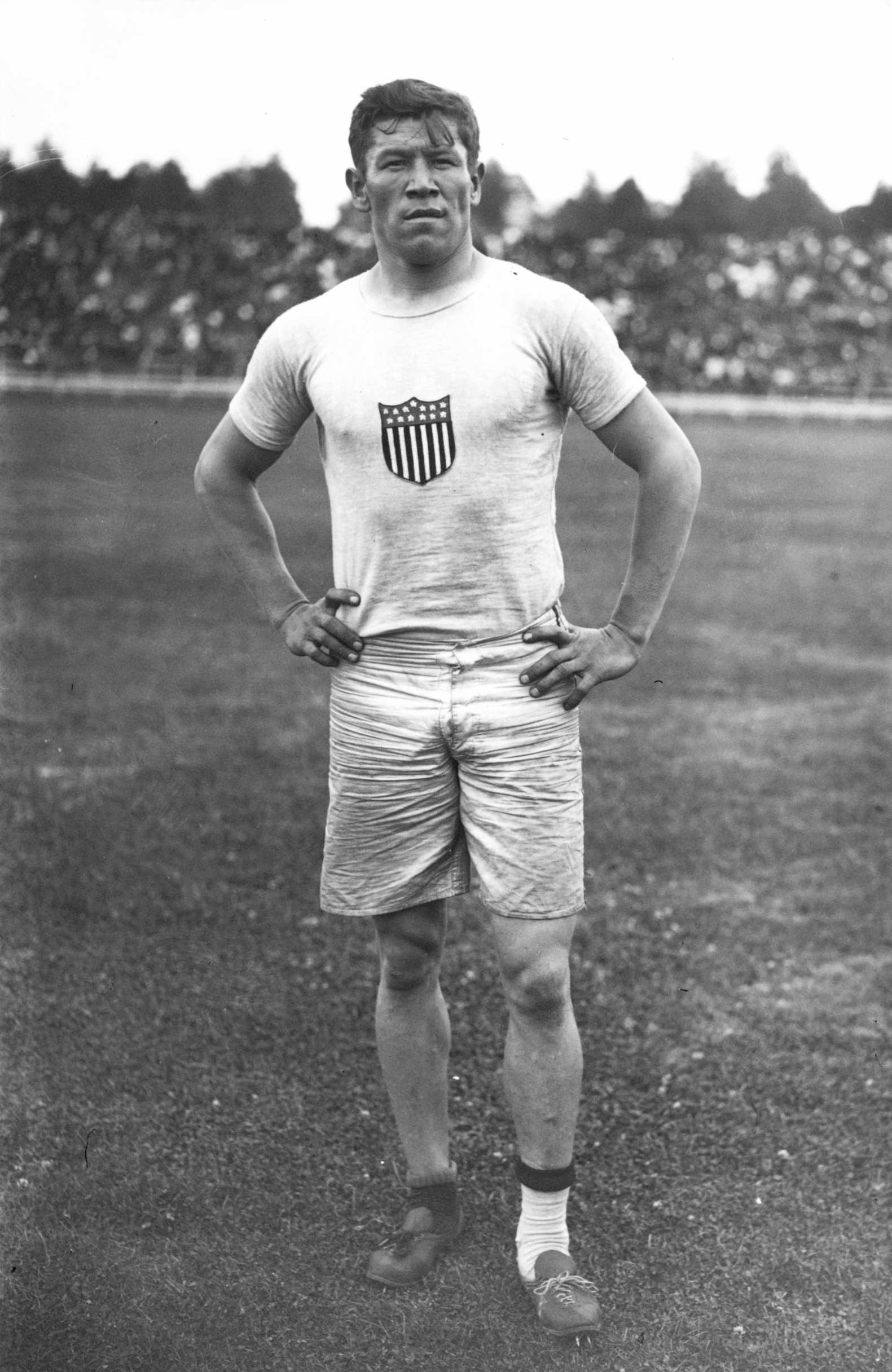
Jim Thorpe is remembered as a trailblazer, breaking barriers for Native American athletes

The 1904 Summer Olympics in St. Louis, Missouri, marked the first occasion the Olympic Games were held outside of Europe. American athletes excelled in athletics, winning numerous gold medals. Notable performers included Archie Hahn, who won three gold medals in sprint events (60m, 100m, and 200m); James Lightbody, who won three gold medals in middle-distance events (800m, 1500m, and 2590m steeplechase); and Ray Ewry, who won three gold medals in standing jumps (high jump, long jump, and triple jump). Harry Hillman capturing multiple gold medals in various track and field events. The games coincided with the Louisiana Purchase Exposition, a world's fair.

Continuing their track and field dominance, Team USA showcased formidable talent at the 1908 London Olympics. Notable athletes such as Ray Ewry (who won three gold medals in standing jumps), John Taylor (gold in 400m), and Mel Sheppard (gold in 800m and 1500m) contributed to the USA's success in athletics. Athletes such as Mel Sheppard emerged as stars, claiming multiple gold medals and solidifying America's status as a powerhouse in athletics. One of the most famous moments involving an American athlete at the 1908 Olympics was during the marathon race. Italian runner Dorando Pietri collapsed near the finish line due to exhaustion and was helped across the line by officials, but was subsequently disqualified, allowing American Johnny Hayes to win the gold medal.

American athletes continued to dominate in track and field event, and the 1912 Stockholm Olympics marked a significant milestone in American sports history as Jim Thorpe, a Native American athlete, achieved a unique feat by clinching gold medals in both the pentathlon and decathlon. He showcased exceptional athleticism in the process and become a celebrated figure in Olympic history. Controversy surrounding the supposed amateurism of athletes led to Thorpe's medals being rescinded due to his involvement in semi-professional baseball. They were returned in 1983, and 39 more years later he was restored as the sole winner of both events. Thorpe's legacy remains undiminished. Ralph Craig won the gold medal in both the 100 meters and 200 meters, solidifying American dominance in sprint events. American swimmers also performed well, contributing to the overall medal tally. Notable swimmers included Duke Kahanamoku, who won two gold medals in swimming events (100 meters freestyle and 4×200 meters freestyle relay).

Overall, the U.S. placed first three times during the early Olympic period, and second twice. These editions witnessed inconsistent event scheduling and programs, which usually favored hosting nations.

=== Interwar period (1920–1936) ===
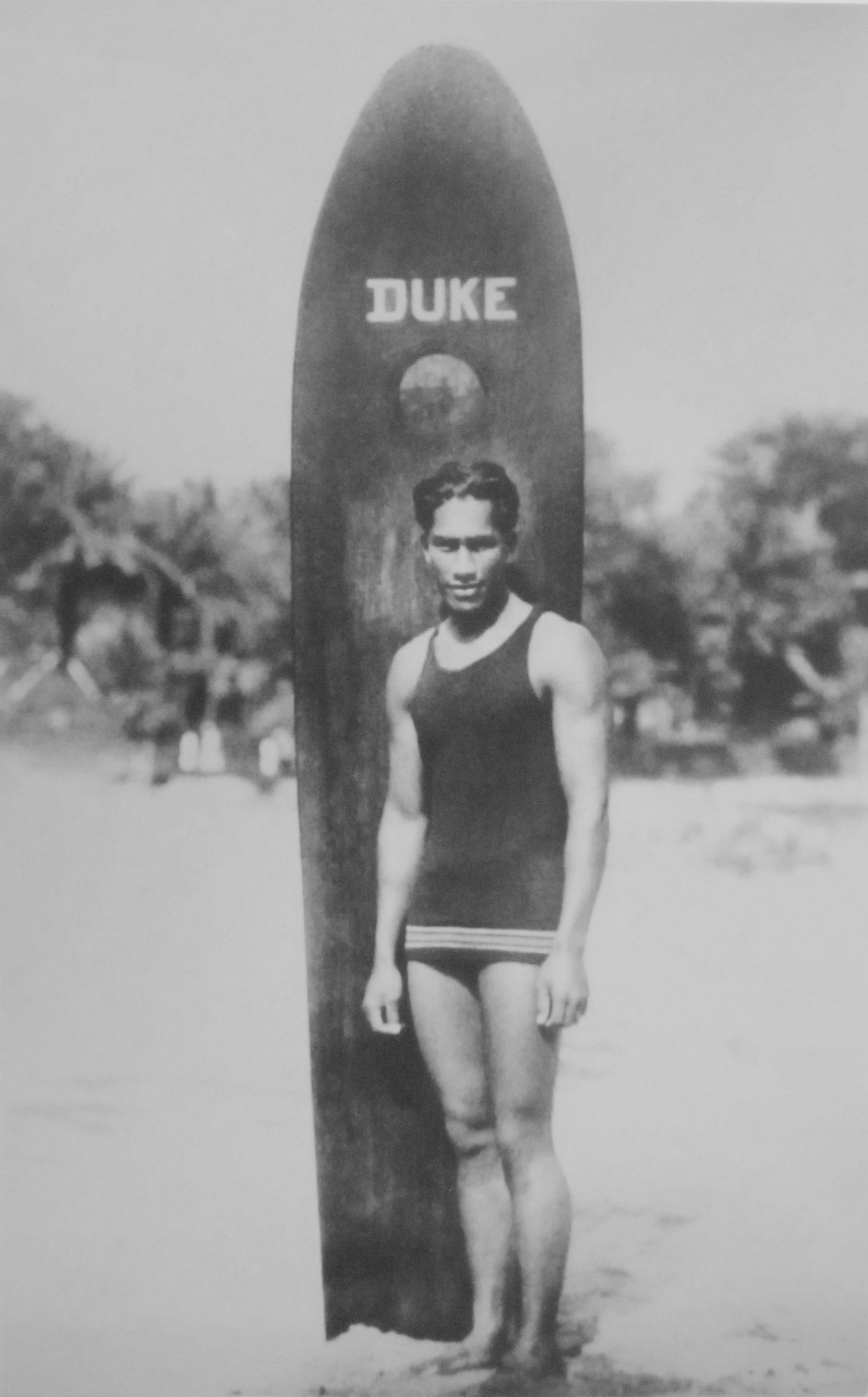
Duke Kahanamoku Hawaiian swimmer, won multiple gold medals at the 1920 Olympics and became renowned for his pioneering contributions to the sport of swimming.

Several notable American athletes participated in the 1920 Antwerp Olympics, including future legendary figures like swimmer Duke Kahanamoku. These games marked a historic moment for American swimming when Ethelda Bleibtrey became the first American woman to earn Olympic gold in the sport. She won three Olympic gold medals overall, sweeping all three women's swimming events available to her (100m, 300m, and 4x100m relay) and setting new world records in each final.

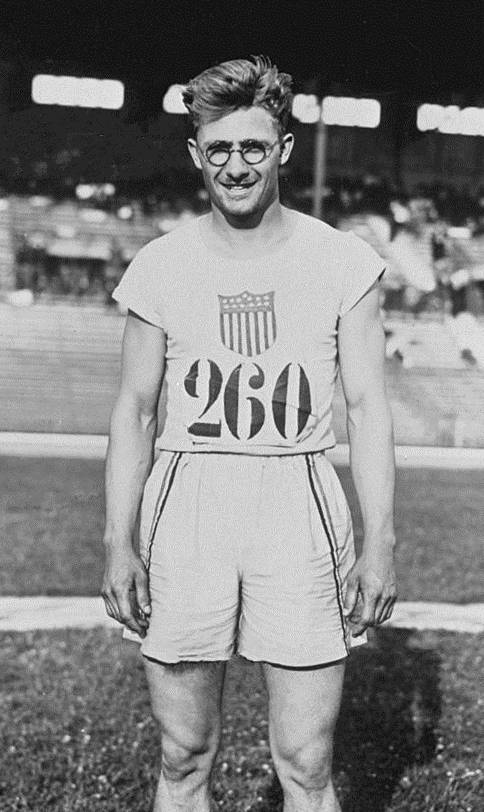
Harold Osborn won the gold medal in the decathlon at the 1924 Olympics in Paris, setting a world record in the process.

In 1924, at the Paris Olympics, Harold Osborn set a new world record while winning gold in the decathlon, and sprinter and long jumper Charley Paddock won two gold medals in the 100 meters and 4×100 meters relay. Johnny Weissmuller, who later gained fame as an actor playing Tarzan, secured two gold medals in swimming at the 1928 Amsterdam Olympics. The USA dominated in diving events, with Aileen Riggin winning a gold medal in the women's 3-meter springboard diving. She became the first American woman to win an Olympic diving gold medal.

The 1932 Los Angeles Olympics distinguished itself as the first Games to host outdoor diving events, a milestone in Olympic history. Throughout these years, track and field remained a cornerstone of Team USA's success, highlighted by standout performances such as Babe Didrikson's achievements. American swimmers continued their tradition of excellence, with Helene Madison winning three gold medals in the women's freestyle events (100m, 400m, and 4×100m relay). The U.S. also performed strongly in team sports and rowing (multiple medals). Lastly, the 1932 Olympics were significant as they were held during the Great Depression, and the success of American athletes provided a morale boost to the nation. The games also highlighted Los Angeles as a major international city capable of hosting large-scale sporting events. Moreover, the United States led both gold and overall medal counts at these four Games, establishing itself as a premier sporting power in the world.

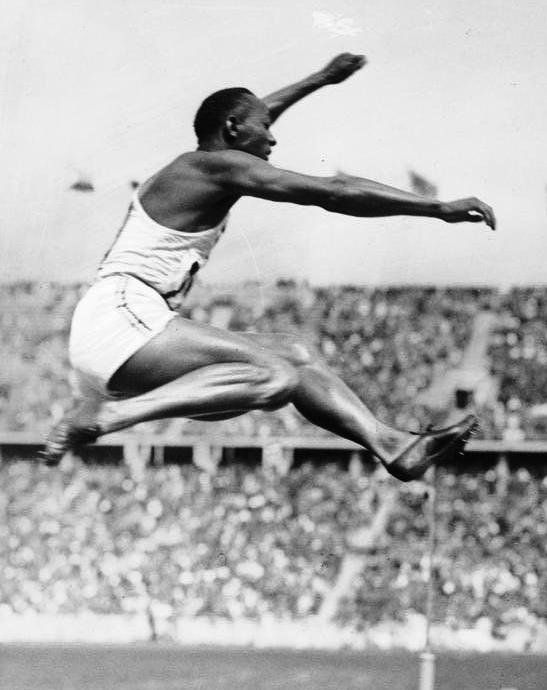
Jesse Owens at the 1936 Olympics

In 1936, Jesse Owens achieved enduring international renown at the Summer Olympics in Berlin, Germany. Owens's four gold medals in the 100 meters, long jump, 200 meters, and 4 × 100-meter relay not only established him as a legend but also challenged and debunked the Nazi theory of Aryan racial superiority on a global stage. However, for the first time since 1908, the U.S. ranked second in the medal standings, behind the hosts. The USA men's basketball team won the inaugural gold medal, establishing their dominance in the sport.

Overall, the United States delegations were highly successful during the interwar period, placing first at four consecutive Summer Olympics in 1920–1932 and second in 1936.

=== Cold War era (1948–1992) ===
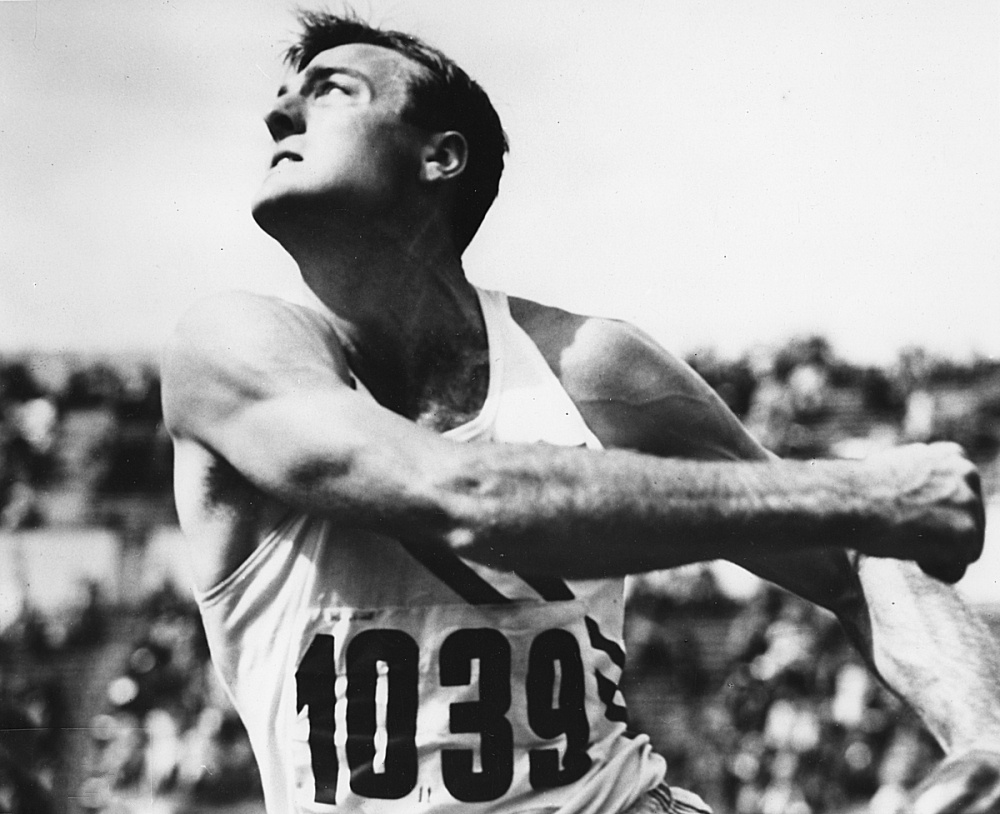
Bob Mathias became the star of the 1948 London games by winning the decathlon event at the age of 17. He would go on to repeat this feat at the 1952 Olympics in Helsinki, setting a new world record.

The 1948 London Olympics marked the first time that newly communist countries, occupied by the Soviet Union after WW2, competed in the games. The Soviets themselves declined to compete, sending only observers, after a long hesitation that saw Soviet leader Joseph Stalin demanding guarantees from his sports officials that the USSR would beat the US in the medal standings. The Soviet officials told him that chances were even, and Stalin ultimately rejected the idea of competing in 1948. With its newest political rival absent, the United States comfortably dominated the games, winning 38 gold and 84 total medals, 22 gold and 40 total medals more than the runner-up Sweden. The most medals were won in track and field, 27, and swimming, 15. The US basketball team won its second consecutive gold medal, defeating France in the final, 65–21. The 1948 London Summer Olympics marked the first time that the Olympic Games were broadcast on television with a more widespread coverage. However, television sets were still not widely available to the public at this time.

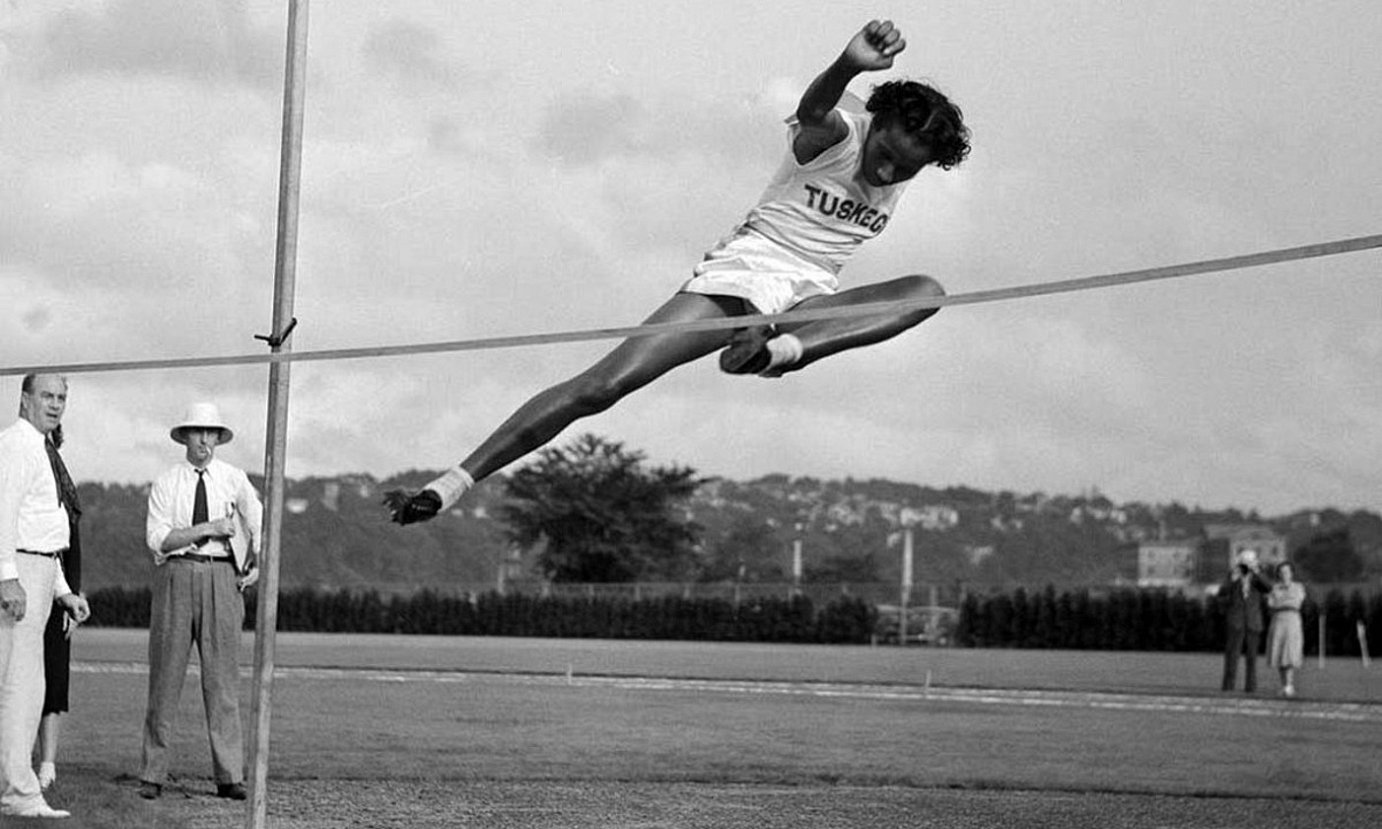
Alice Coachman specialized in high jump and was the first black woman to win an Olympic gold medal.

In 1952, Helsinki saw the Soviets sending a team for the first time. This was a beginning of a new era, as the Soviet Union would go on to dominate the Olympics for the next four decades. The Soviet authorities provided state-funding to their athletes, who trained full-time. The United States still topped the medal count at these games, winning 40 gold and 76 total medals, 18 gold and five total medals more than the Soviets who finished second. American athletes won 31 medals in track and field, their most successful sport. The U.S. basketball team continued its winning streak, capturing the gold medal for the third consecutive time since basketball was introduced as an Olympic sport and twice defeating the Soviets in the process. American boxers won all five finals they entered, and American weightlifters edged their Soviet rivals four to three in terms of gold medals, with the two nations sweeping all seven events in the sport.

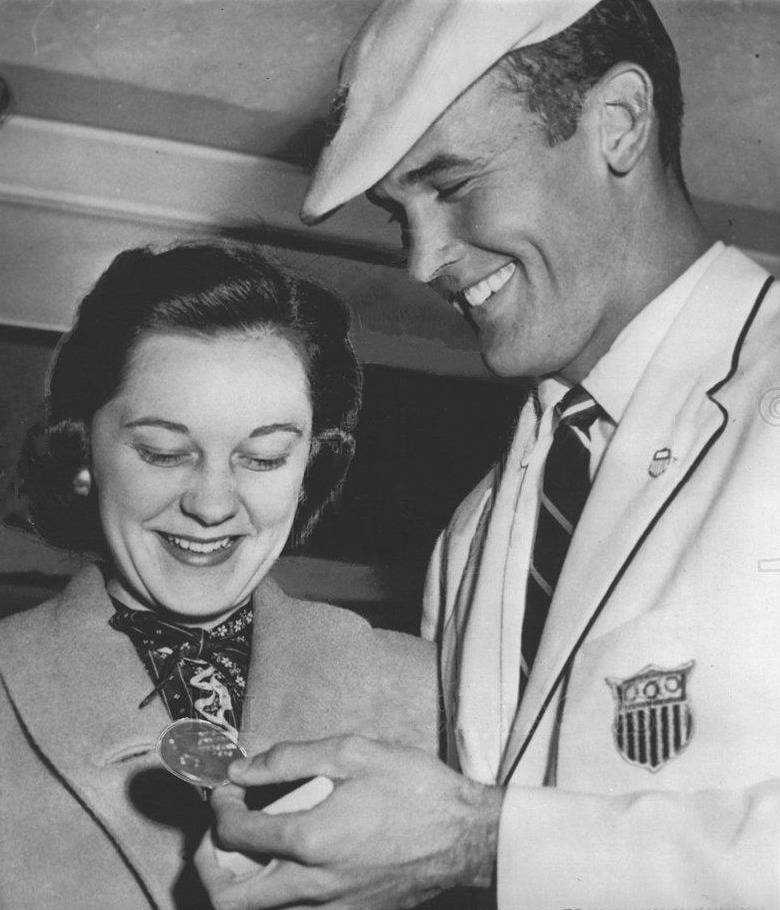
Bobby Morrow won gold in 100 meters, 200 meters, and 4×100 meters relay (track and field) at the 1956 Summer Olympics in Melbourne.

Melbourne hosted the Olympics in 1956. There were calls for the expulsion of the Soviet Union following their invasion of Hungary, but the International Olympic Committee decided not to pursue any action. As a result, some nations boycotted the games in protest of the Soviets' presence, and the Hungarians themselves became engaged in a violent brawl with their Soviet counterparts in a water polo game, an event that was instantly called "Blood in the Water". The U.S. performance at the games was relatively successful, as the Americans earned 32 gold and 78 total medals (second place in the medal standings), 5 gold and 24 total medals less than the first-place Soviets. The U.S. contingent was particularly successful in track and field, where American athletes amassed 31 medals. On the other hand, the U.S. won only 2 golds in swimming, being unable to stop the Australian domination of the swimming events at these games. In weightlifting, the Americans and Soviets once again won all seven events, with four and three golds, respectively. In boxing, the Soviets won 3 golds, while the Americans only won two events. However, it was gymnastics where the USSR achieved its greatest success, winning 11 out of 17 events and guaranteeing first place in the medal rankings. The U.S. basketball team won its fourth consecutive gold, beating the Soviets in the final game, 89–55. The 1956 Melbourne Summer Olympics were the first to be broadcast live via satellite. This allowed for real-time coverage of events across the globe, significantly expanding the audience reach.

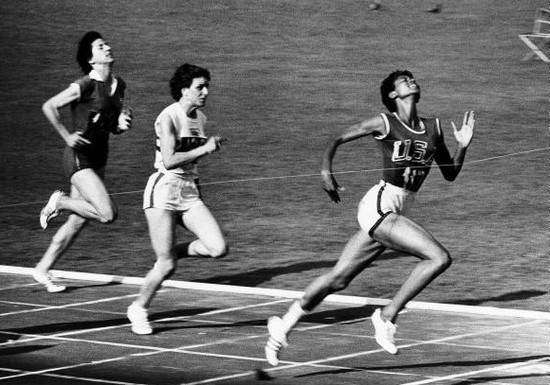
Wilma Rudolph became the first woman in history to sweep 100 meters, 200 meters, and 4×100 meters relay at the 1960 Rome Games.

The 1960 Rome Olympics saw the Americans losing their grip on their traditionally successful sports, such as track and field and weightlifting. On the other hand, boxing, swimming (where the Americans won 9 gold medals, while being controversially denied gold in the 100 meters freestyle), and wrestling produced unexpectedly good results. In track and field, the U.S. won 12 golds, as the U.S. team encountered problems, such as a controversial disqualification of their gold medal-winning men's 4×100 relay team. In weightlifting, the Soviets won five out of seven events, leaving the U.S. with one gold. The U.S. basketball team met the pre-tournament expectations and won its fifth consecutive gold medal. The final result of 34 gold and 71 total medals for the U.S., compared to the USSR's 43 gold and 103 total medals, showed that the U.S. was no longer the dominant force in Olympic competition. The 1960 Rome Summer Olympics were the first to be broadcast in the United States on CBS, with extensive coverage.

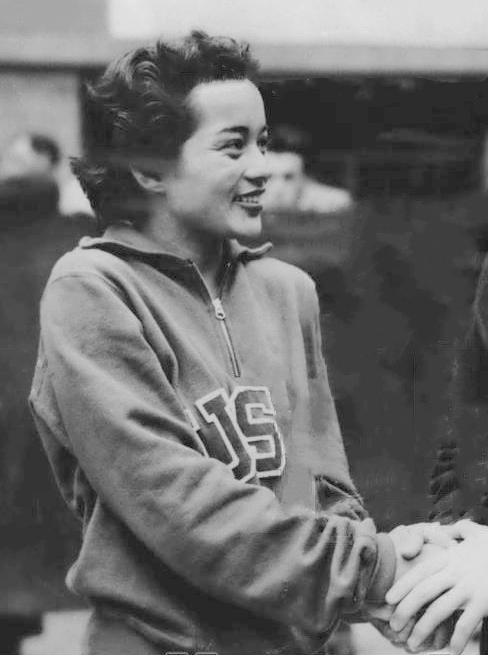
Victoria Manalo Draves was the first American woman to win two gold medals in diving, and the first Asian American to win Olympic gold medals.

There was some redemption for the U.S. at the 1964 Summer Olympics in Tokyo, as the nation returned to the top of the gold medal count for the first time since 1952. Particularly successful was the U.S. swimming team that won 13 out of an available 18 golds and shattered 9 world records. In track and field, the Americans also improved on their 1960 performance, winning 14 gold and 24 total medals. The Soviets, continued to dominate Olympic weightlifting, and, with the American program falling short, the USSR produced four golds and three silvers. However, for the Americans, despite a dismal performance in boxing, where they achieved only one gold, the 1964 Olympics were a definite success, with the nation winning 36 gold and 90 total medals, compared to the Soviet tally of 30 gold and 96 total medals. The U.S. topped the gold medal count, finishing second in the total medal count, while the USSR topped the total medal count and finished second in the gold medal count. The U.S. basketball team won its sixth consecutive gold, beating the USSR in the final, 73–59.

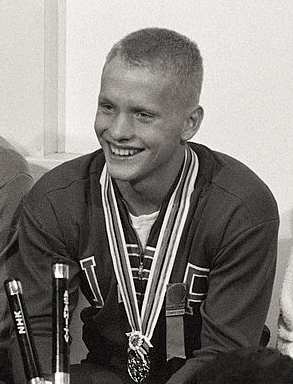
Don Schollander won 4 golds in swimming at the 1964 games in Tokyo, the largest individual medal haul in a single Olympics since Jesse Owens in 1936.

The 1968 Mexico Olympics became the most successful summer games for the U.S. in the post-war era. American athletes amassed 45 gold and 107 total medals. The U.S. swimming team dominated the competition, winning a staggering 51 medals and sweeping the podium on five occasions. The Americans also managed to medal in each of the 29 swimming events, thus achieving a unique feat. The U.S. track and field team won 15 gold and 28 total medals. Swimming and athletics accounted for more than 70% of all U.S. medals and ensured the top place in the medal table for the Americans for the second consecutive Games and their first finish at the top of the overall medal table since 1952. In other sports, however, the performance of American athletes was less convincing. The U.S. weightlifting team continued to fade, winning just one medal. American boxers won 7 medals, of which two were gold, while U.S. divers won 6 medals. The men's volleyball team stunned the defending champions from the Soviet Union, beating them in five sets, but still finished out of medals. The U.S. basketball team won its seventh consecutive gold medal, a feat not matched by any other Olympic team in ball sports. It was to be the last time that the U.S. finished first in the medal table in a fully attended Summer Olympics until 1996 (the Americans would top the medal standings in 1984 amid the Soviet boycott). The 1968 Grenoble Winter Olympics were the first to be broadcast in color, enhancing the viewing experience for audiences worldwide.

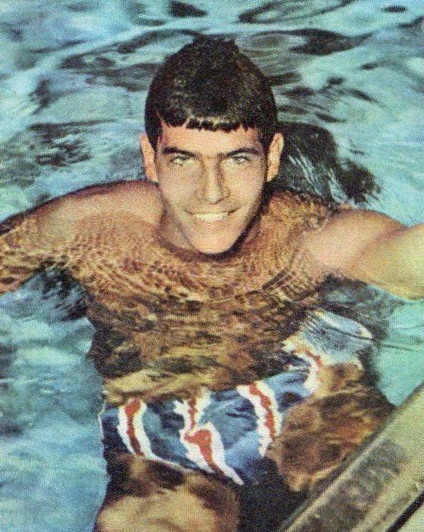
Mark Andrew Spitz swimmer and nine-time Olympic champion. He was the most successful athlete at the 1972 Summer Olympics in Munich, winning seven gold medals, each in world-record time.

The Munich Olympics was largely overshadowed by the Munich massacre in the second week, in which eleven Israeli athletes and coaches and a West German police officer at Olympic village were killed by Black September terrorists. There were multiple calls to cancel the games after the terrorist attack, but the IOC declined. From a sporting standpoint, these Olympic Games were among the most controversial in history and one of the strangest Olympics ever for American athletes. U.S. world record holders in the 100 meters were given the wrong starting time and were unable to compete in the event. In swimming, the U.S. gold medal winner in the 400 meters freestyle was stripped of his medal for using his prescription asthma medication, also depriving him of a chance at multiple medals. U.S. boxers complained that they were judged unfairly in the bouts against their communist counterparts. In shooting, a U.S. athlete initially won the 50 meters rifle only to be relegated to silver after a "review". Finally, in the most controversial event of the Games, and one of the most controversial events of all time, the U.S. basketball team was denied gold after apparently winning the final match against the Soviet Union. The final three seconds of the game were replayed three times until the Soviets came out on top. The Americans did not accept the silver medals, believing that they were robbed. This was the first U.S. loss in Olympic basketball history, and it ended the Americans' 63-game winning streak in Olympic basketball. In general, the U.S. team greatly underperformed at these Games, winning only 6 gold medals in track and field to the East Germans' 8 and Soviets' 9, though the Americans still won the most total medals, 22. In boxing, the Cubans and Soviets dominated, winning three and two championships, respectively, while the U.S. won only one gold and four medals overall. In diving, the Americans won three medals; in wrestling, the U.S. team surprised with three golds in freestyle. In water polo, the Americans struck bronze, tying the eventual gold medalists, the Soviet Union, in the final round. Swimming was the only sport where the American team did not disappoint, winning 17 gold and 43 total medals. American women dominated swimming for the last time until 1992.

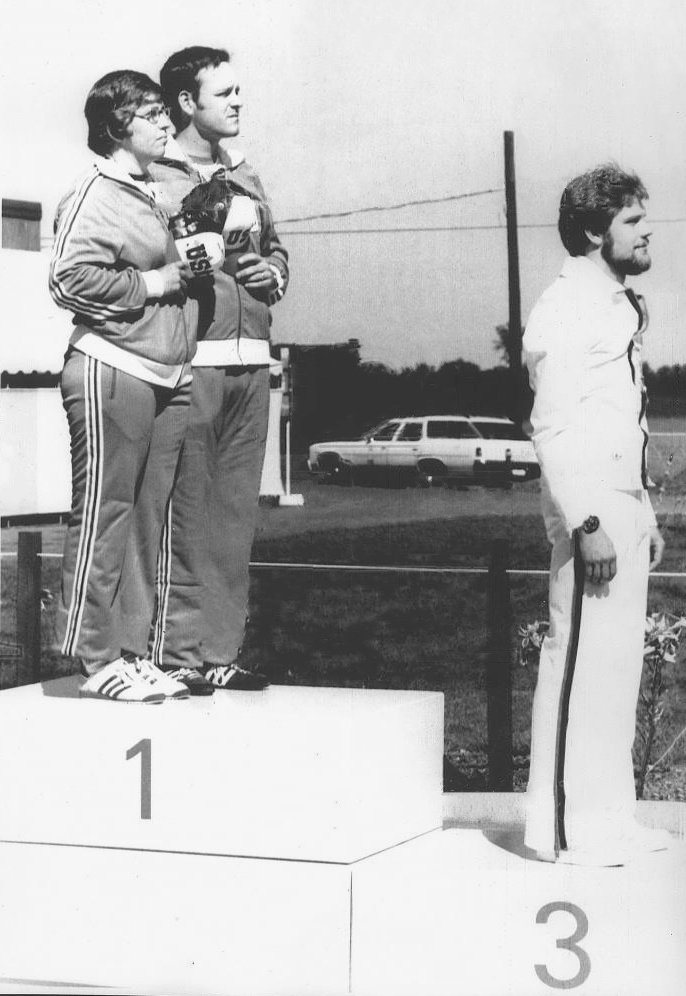
In 1976, Margaret Murdock captured the silver in the three positions shooting event. Lanny Bassham and Murdock tied for the first place, but Murdock was placed second after review of the targets. Bassham suggested that two gold medals be given, and after this request was declined, asked Murdock to share the top step with him at the award ceremony. Women had no separate shooting events at the time and were allowed to compete with men. Murdock became the first woman to win an Olympic medal in shooting.

The Eastern Bloc dominated the 1976 Montreal Olympics, with seven countries placing in the top ten of the medal table. The United States team was relegated to a third place in the medal standings for the first time in its history. This was an Olympics of contrasts: the U.S. men's swimming team, despite the generally dismal showing of the overall delegation, swept 12 gold and 27 total medals in the 13 events that were on the program and broke 11 world records in the process, while the US women's swimming team, on the other hand, fell victim to what was later shown to be a pervasive East German doping program. They still managed to win one gold medal, in an upset of the East Germans in the 4×100 freestyle relay. The event was held on the last day of the swimming program, and the American women were risking being deprived of gold for the first time in U.S. Olympic history. The victory was somewhat overlooked at the time, but since the early 1990s, when public revelation of the doping program began, the American gold medal is considered to be one of the sport's most improbable upsets. In track and field, both the U.S. men's and women's teams were overwhelmed by East Germans who secured a bulk of medals in the signature sports of the U.S., resulting in the USSR topping the medal table. The U.S. boxing team surprised everyone, advancing to six gold medal bouts and winning five of them, drawing parallels to a stellar 1952 team that also took five golds. The achievement was even more notable due to the fact that the American boxers were significantly younger and less experienced than their Cuban and Soviet counterparts. In other sports, U.S. divers won five medals, including two golds; the U.S. equestrian team took home four medals; American shooters won three medals, including a historic silver by a woman in the mixed 50 meters rifle three positions; U.S. freestyle wrestlers advanced to four gold medal bouts, yet won only one of them, concluding the meet with six medals overall. The U.S. men's basketball team reclaimed the gold medal, while the women's team won a surprising silver, being ranked no higher than sixth prior to the start of the tournament. The Soviets and East Germans were unstoppable in canoeing, gymnastics, rowing, weightlifting and wrestling, going 1–2 in the overall medal standings (49 gold and 125 total medals for the Soviets, and 40 gold and 90 total medals for East Germans). The U.S. won medals in 14 sports, finishing third with 34 gold and 94 total medals. The most successful day for the Americans was July 31 when they won 8 gold and 18 total medals.

The 1980 Summer Olympics marked another first for the United States, as the nation led by far the largest and most significant boycott in the Olympic history. The boycott was motivated by the 1979 Soviet invasion of Afghanistan. The United States and 65 other countries chose not to attend the Moscow Games, leaving them with the smallest attendance since 1956. Predictably, the great majority of the medals were taken by the host country and East Germany in what was the most skewed medal tally since 1904. The Soviets amassed 80 gold (all-time record) and 195 total (second-best result after the US in 1904) medals in their anticlimactic performance.

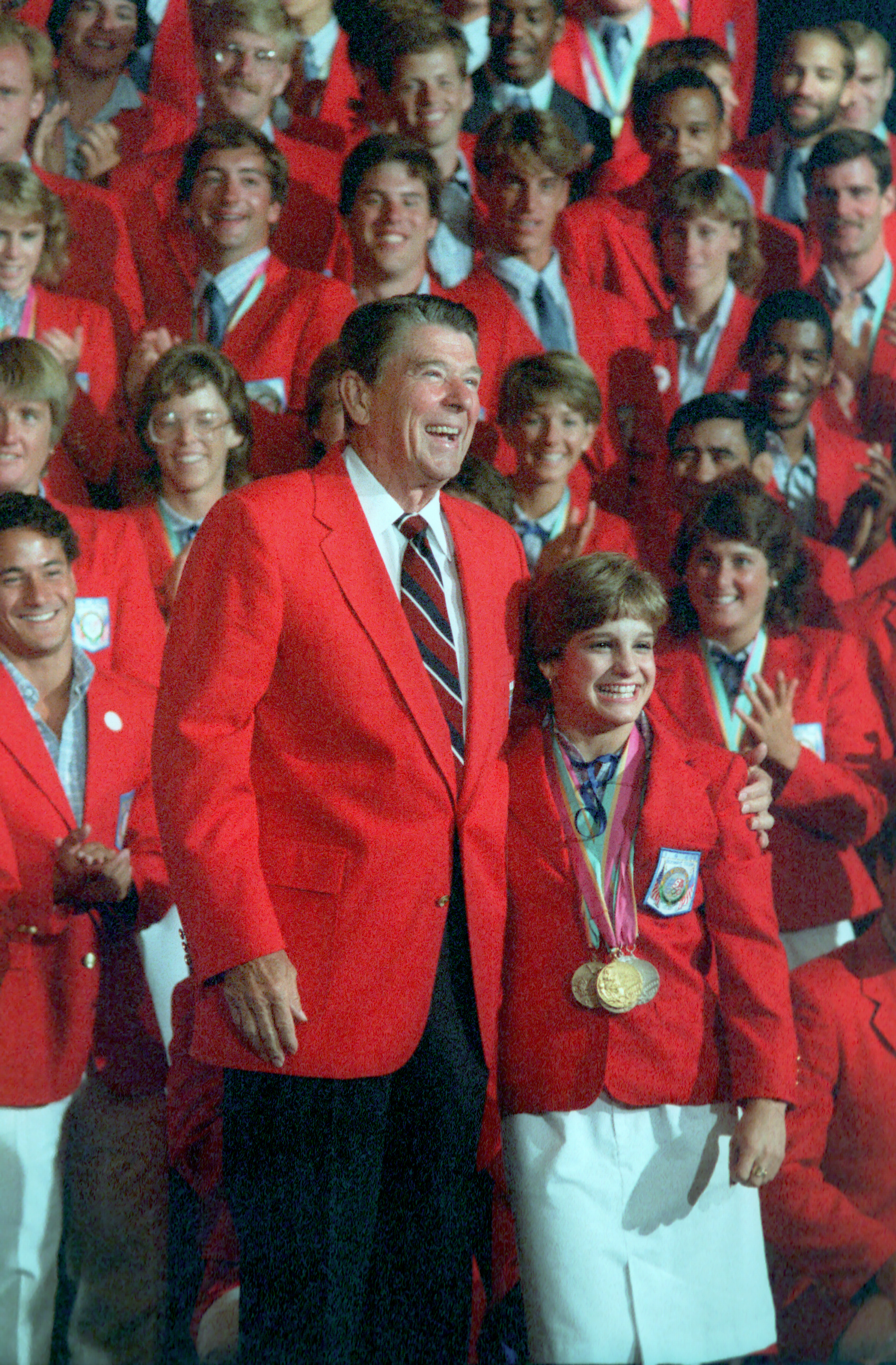
President Ronald Reagan and Mary Lou Retton with the U.S. Olympic Team in Los Angeles, 1984. Retton had just recovered in time from surgery to compete for the all-around title, where she completed two perfect 10s to defeat her Soviet-bloc competitor by .05 points for the gold medal.

In 1984, Los Angeles witnessed what was considered a retaliatory boycott by the Soviets and their satellites, although the Soviets cited security concerns and "chauvinistic sentiments and an anti-Soviet hysteria being whipped up in the United States." However, no threat to Eastern Bloc athletes was ever discovered, and the athletes from the Eastern Bloc country that did attend the 1984 games in Los Angeles—Romania—encountered no problems, and in fact were widely cheered above all other visiting nations at the Opening Ceremonies when they marched into the Los Angeles Memorial Coliseum (Romania ended up finishing second in the medal table at the Games). Furthermore, despite the Soviet boycott, a record 140 nations (including China, which participated for the first time since 1952) attended the Games. The 1984 Los Angeles Summer Olympics marked the first time that the Games were broadcast in multiple channels simultaneously, offering viewers a variety of events to watch.

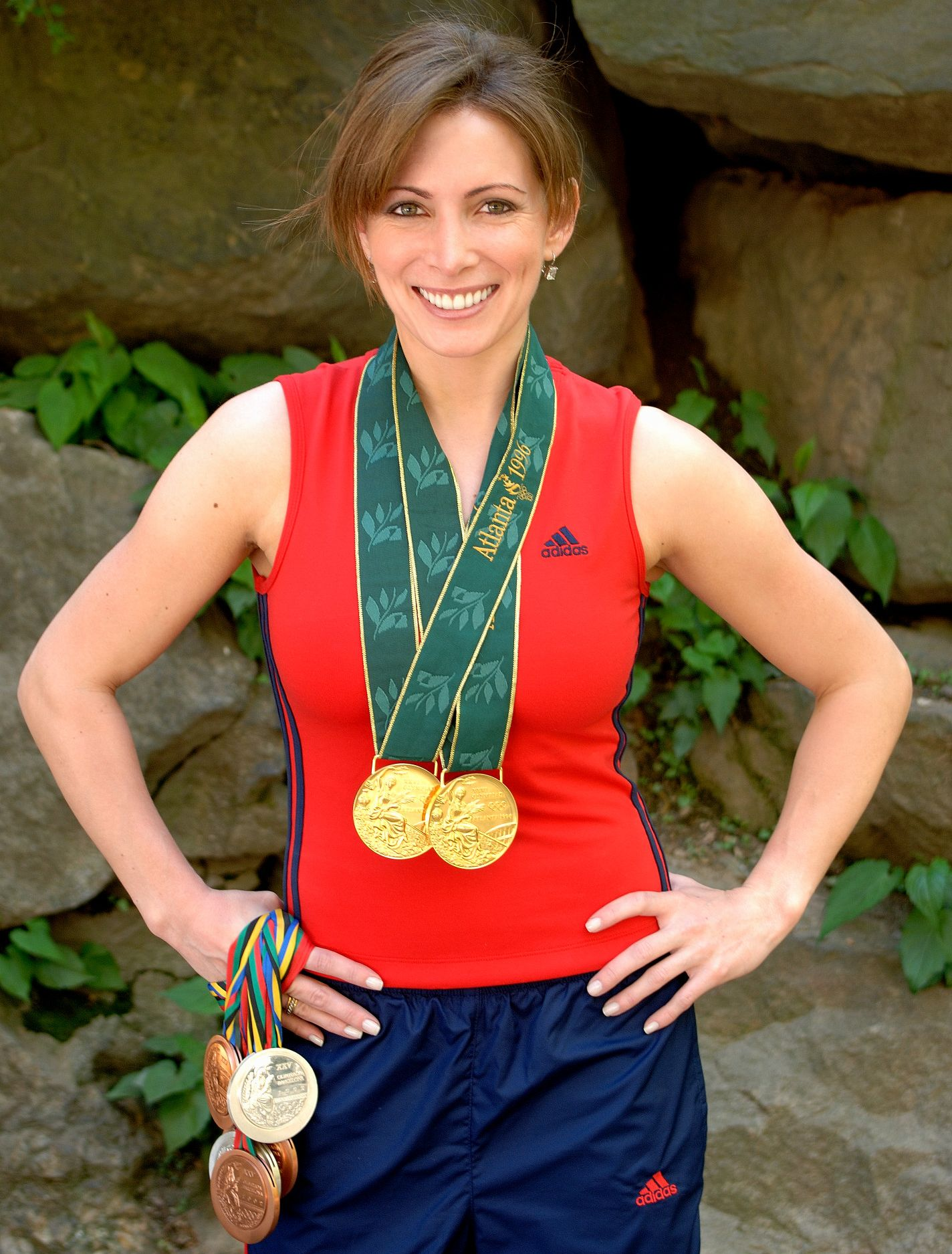
Among Olympic medalists, Shannon Miller is widely regarded as one of the greatest gymnasts in American history, with her achievements at the Olympics and beyond sports leaving an enduring legacy.

There were fears that the Soviet Union would boycott the 1988 Summer Olympics in Seoul as well, because South Korea had no diplomatic relations with the USSR, which recognized and supported only North Korea. However, the policies of Perestroika that were initiated by Gorbachev in 1985 led to the Soviet participation in the Games. Cuba decided to boycott the Olympics on its own, impacting the boxing field as a result. The Soviets and East Germany dominated what would be their last Olympics, winning 55 and 37 gold medals respectively (132 and 102 total medals). The United States placed third with 36 and 94. 1976 and 1988 are the only occasions where America failed to make the top two at the Summer Olympics (although in 1976 they placed second by total medals).

During the Cold War era, American athletes placed first in the medal count five times, second four times (including 1992), and third twice. Out of all periods, this was the United States' least dominant.

=== Modern period (1996–present) ===
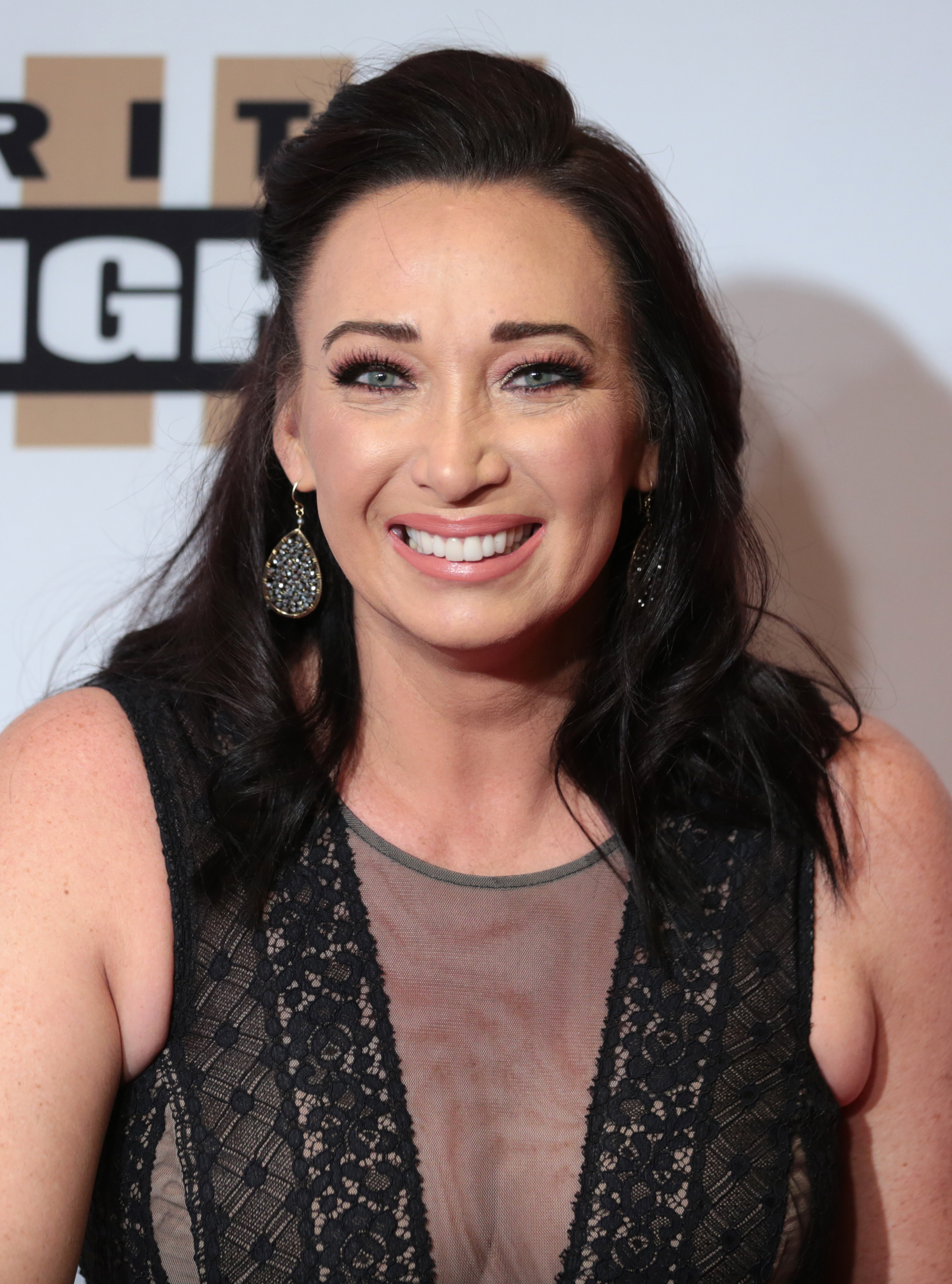
Amy Van Dyken's achievements in swimming, particularly her historic performance at the 1996 Atlanta Olympics, make her one of the greatest American swimmers of that time.

U.S. athletes have appeared in every Summer Olympics Games in recent decades, with their fortunes having steadily improved in most sports since 1992. America finished second in the medal count in 1992 and 2008, while placing first at seven other Games in that period.

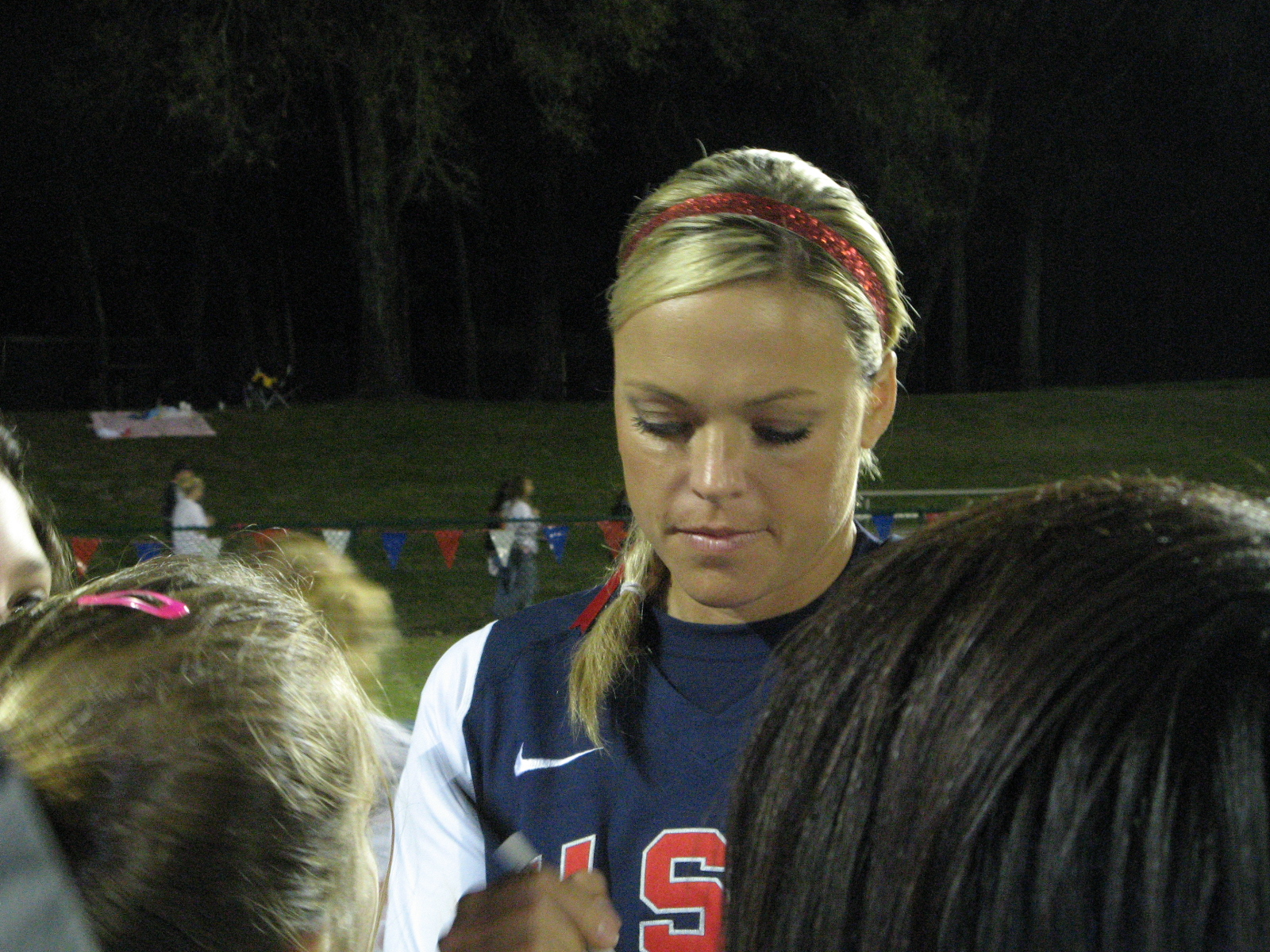
Jennie Finch signing autographs. From 1998 to 2010, Finch became the most recognizable face on a dominant U.S. softball squad. Her 2004 Olympics showing put her on an elite level, as she helped lead Team USA to a gold medal.

The United States, represented by the United States Olympic & Paralympic Committee (USOPC), competed at the 2020 Summer Olympics in Tokyo. Originally scheduled to take place in the summer of 2020, the Games were postponed to July 23 to August 8, 2021, due to the COVID-19 pandemic. The opening ceremony flag-bearers for the United States were baseball player Eddy Alvarez and basketball player Sue Bird. Javelin thrower Kara Winger was the flag-bearer for the closing ceremony. When USA Gymnastics announced that 2016 Olympic all-around champion Simone Biles would not participate in the gymnastics all-around final, the spotlight fell on her American teammates. The U.S. had won the event in each of the last five Olympic Games: a formidable winning streak was on the line. Sunisa Lee embraced the moment and stood tall to deliver for her country. She totaled 57.433 to hold off Rebeca Andrade of Brazil (57.298) to clinch the title. Lee also made history of her own. With victory in the all-around she became the first Hmong American gymnast to win an Olympic gold medal, and the first gymnast of Asian descent to do so. With a silver in the women's team final and bronze in the individual uneven bars Lee left Tokyo with an impressive three Olympic medals. Lydia Jacoby, Alaska's teenage swimming sweetheart, made history when she became the first Alaskan swimmer selected to make the U.S. Olympic swim team. She stunned the world to secure victory in the women's 100m breaststroke. Recent major champion Nelly Korda followed the winning ways of compatriot Xander Schauffele to take home gold in the women's golf competition. The 2.01m-tall thrower Ryan Crouser retained his Olympic title in the men's shot put and did so in some style, setting an Olympic record three times. The U.S. achieved a commanding lead in the overall medal count, with 113 medals, but only edged China in the gold medal tally on the last day, finishing with 39 gold medals to China's 38.

== Russia–United States rivalry ==
Russia (in all its incarnations) and the United States each have won more Olympic medals than any other nation. Russia topped the overall medal count at 7 Summer Olympics and 8 Winter Olympics, while the United States placed first at 19 Summer Olympics and 1 Winter Olympics.

Medal totals of the Soviet Union/Unified Team/Russia/ROC/AIN and the United States since 1952, when the Soviet Union started to compete, are presented below.

Russia
Games	Gold	Silver	Bronze	Total	Rank
1952 Helsinki	22	30	19	71	2
1956 Melbourne	37	29	32	98	1
1960 Rome	43	29	31	103	1
1964 Tokyo	30	31	35	96	2
1968 Mexico City	29	32	30	91	2
1972 Munich	50	27	22	99	1
1976 Montreal	49	41	35	125	1
1980 Moscow	80	69	46	195	1
1984 Los Angeles	did not participate				
1988 Seoul	55	31	46	132	1
1992 Barcelona	45	38	29	112	1
1996 Atlanta	26	21	16	63	2
2000 Sydney	32	28	29	89	2
2004 Athens	28	26	36	90	3
2008 Beijing	24	13	23	60	3
2012 London	18	21	26	65	4
2016 Rio de Janeiro	19	17	20	56	4
2020 Tokyo	20	28	23	71	5
2024 Paris	0	1	0	1	74
Total	607	512	498	1617	2

United States
Games	Gold	Silver	Bronze	Total	Rank
1952 Helsinki	40	19	17	76	1
1956 Melbourne	32	25	17	74	2
1960 Rome	34	21	16	71	2
1964 Tokyo	36	26	28	90	1
1968 Mexico City	45	28	34	107	1
1972 Munich	33	31	30	94	2
1976 Montreal	34	35	25	94	3
1980 Moscow	did not participate				
1984 Los Angeles	83	61	30	174	1
1988 Seoul	36	31	27	94	3
1992 Barcelona	37	34	37	108	2
1996 Atlanta	44	32	25	101	1
2000 Sydney	37	24	32	93	1
2004 Athens	36	39	26	101	1
2008 Beijing	36	39	37	112	2
2012 London	48	26	31	105	1
2016 Rio de Janeiro	46	37	38	121	1
2020 Tokyo	39	41	33	113	1
2024 Paris	40	42	44	126	1
Total	736	591	527	1854	1

Overall, the United States (1896–1976, 1984–present) has won 1,105 gold and 2,764 total medals, and Russia (1900, 1908–1912, 1952—1980, 1988–present) has won 608 gold and 1,625 total medals.

=== Basketball ===
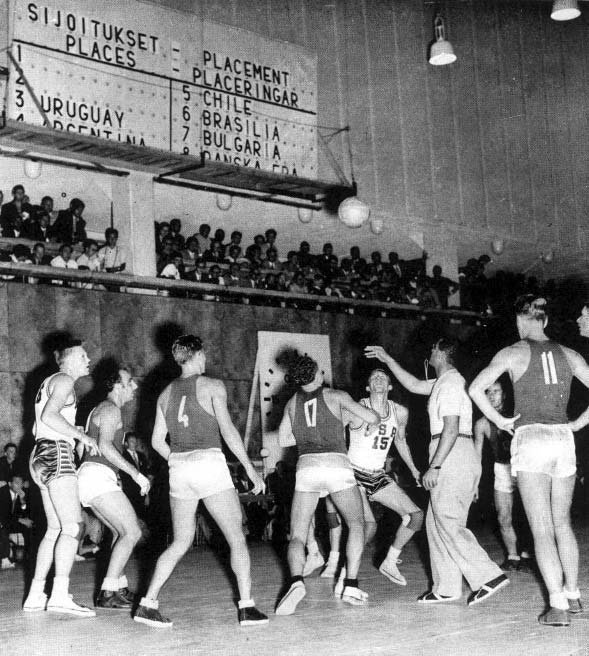
Gold medal game in basketball at the 1952 Olympics between the US and the USSR. The Americans won, 36–25.

The United States and Soviet Union sporting adversary reached its peak during the Cold War. The U.S. men's team was considered a favorite in the run-up to the 1972 Games. Since the first Olympic basketball tournament at the 1936 Olympics in Berlin, the Americans have not lost a single game, winning seven consecutive gold medals in a dominating fashion. Their record reached an unprecedented 63-0 before the final game. Since the 1952 tournament the Soviet team challenged the Americans, winning silver in 1952, 1956, 1960, 1964 and bronze in 1968. Outside of the Olympics, the Soviets had already defeated the U.S. team in the World Championship play. However, the Americans never sent their best collegiate players to that tournament.

The Olympics strictly prohibited any involvement of professional athletes at the time. The Soviet Union and other Eastern Bloc countries used that rule to their advantage, listing all its top players as soldiers or workers what allowed them to breach the amateur rules. Western experts classified these athletes as professionals. On the other hand, leading American players were unable to play in the Olympics as they were officially professional and played in the NBA. That disadvantage had not prevented the Americans from winning the first seven Olympic basketball tournaments without a single defeat.

The confrontation of the Soviet Union and United States on the basketball court was deeply connected to the confrontation on the political front. Many American viewers assumed that 1972 Games were openly anti-American. There were rumors that the Communist party had bribed the officials because they wanted the USSR to win 50 gold medals at these Olympics in commemoration of the 50th anniversary of the Soviet Union.

The United States team was the youngest in history. American players usually participated in the Olympics once before turning pro, and the U.S. team always had new players every four years. The 1972 team did not have a clear leader. A rising star Bill Walton declined an invitation to participate. Nevertheless, the team was heavily favored featuring such players as Doug Collins or Tommy Burleson (the tallest player among all teams).

The young American team was confronted by a veteran Soviet team, featuring stars Sergei Belov, Modestas Paulauskas, and Alexander Belov. The players had played together for more than seven years. For Gennadi Volnov it was the fourth Olympic appearance.

The Soviets performed strongly at the beginning, winning the first half 26:21. The Soviets kept the Americans 4–8 points behind during the first half.

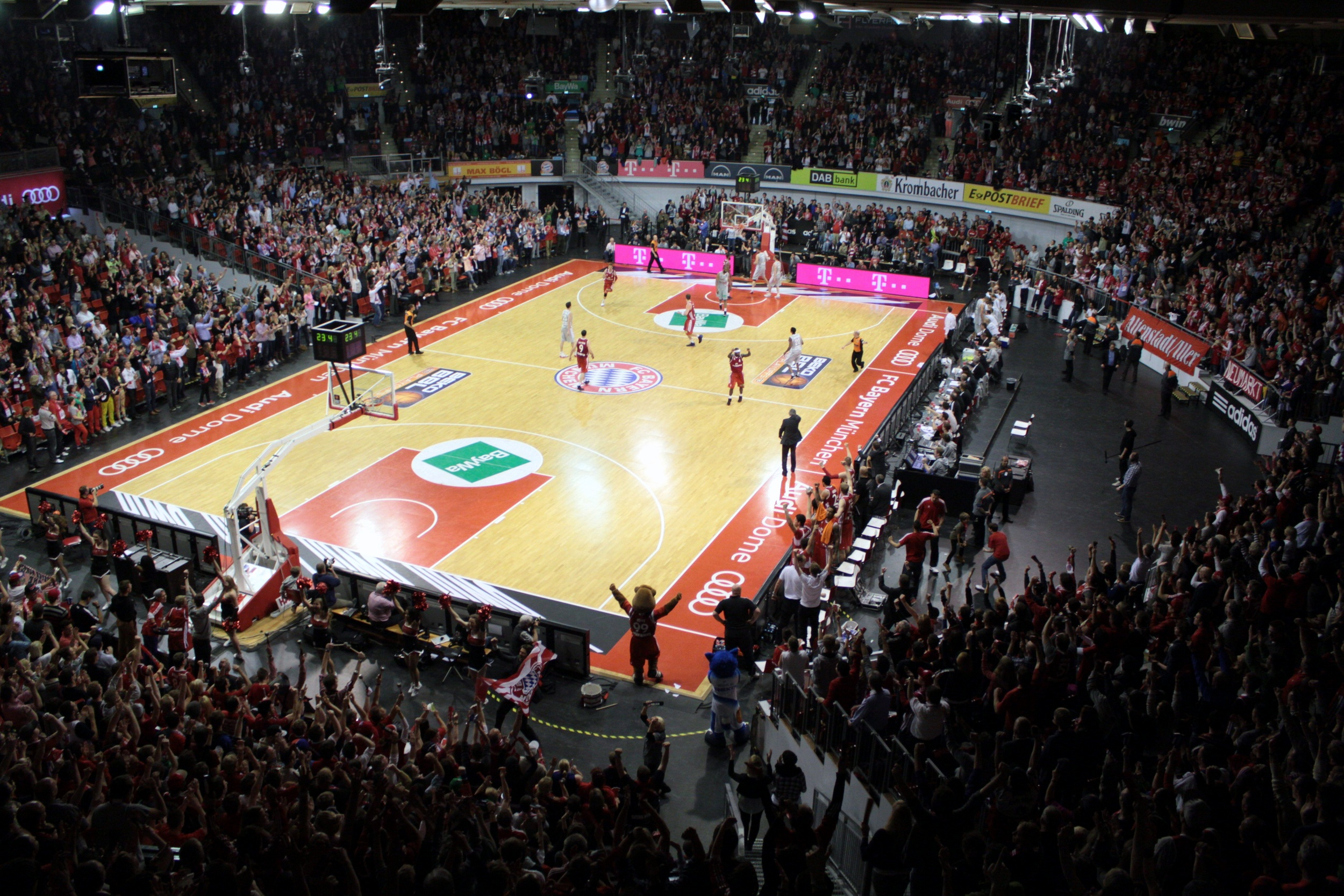
Inside view (in 2014) of the Rudi-Sedlmayer-Halle, where the final was played

In the second half Soviets targeted Dwight Jones, as they considered him the leader of the U.S. team. On the 28th minute he was provoked by Mikheil Korkia and responded. Both players were sent off. The Soviets were satisfied, as they deemed Korkia less significant for them than Jones for the Americans. The next minute Alexander Belov hit Jim Brewer during the free-throw, and Brewer was unable to continue playing. According to the Americans, the referees did not notice the foul.

With 10 minutes left, the Soviets increased their lead to 10 points. After that Americans finally started to press the Soviets. It helped them to cut the deficit to 1 point. Soviet players started to feel nervous. With less than a minute left, Doug Collins stole a Soviet pass at halfcourt and was fouled hard by Zurab Sakandelidze as he drove toward the basket, being knocked down into the basket stanchion. With three seconds remaining on the game clock, Collins was awarded two free throws and sank the first to tie the score at 49. Just as Collins lifted the ball to begin his shooting motion in attempting the second free throw, the horn from the scorer's table sounded, marking the beginning of a chain of events that left the game's final three seconds mired in controversy. Although the unexpected sound of the horn caused lead referee Renato Righetto to turn away from the free throw attempt and look over to the scorer's table, play was not stopped. Collins never broke his shooting motion and continued with his second free throw, scoring to put the U.S. ahead by a score of 50:49. Immediately following Collins' free throws, the Soviets inbounded the ball and failed to score. Soviet coaches claimed that they had requested a timeout before Collins' foul shots. The referees ordered the clock reset to three seconds and the game's final seconds replayed. The horn sounded as a length-of-the-court Soviet pass was being released from the inbounding player, the pass missed its mark, and the American players began celebrating. Nevertheless, final three seconds were replayed for a third time. This time, the Soviets' Alexander Belov and the USA's Kevin Joyce and Jim Forbes went up for the pass, and Belov caught the long pass from Ivan Edeshko near the American basket. Belov then laid the ball in for the winning points as the buzzer sounded.

The Americans regained the basketball crown in 1976, but their ability to stay competitive with college players against seasoned professionals from the Soviet Union was decreasing. In 1988, the Soviets beat the United States once again, eliminating them in the semifinals. That game was a turning point in international basketball, as FIBA officials concluded that amateur rules were unfair. In 1989, NBA players were finally allowed in the Olympics.

== United States–China rivalry ==
Since the beginning of the 21st century, China with its booming economy has replaced Russia as the United States' main rival in terms of the Summer Olympics medal count.

China
Games	Gold	Silver	Bronze	Total	Rank
2000 Sydney	28	16	14	58	3
2004 Athens	32	17	14	63	2
2008 Beijing	48	22	30	100	1
2012 London	39	31	22	92	2
2016 Rio de Janeiro	26	18	26	70	3
2020 Tokyo	38	32	19	89	2
2024 Paris	40	27	24	91	2

United States
Games	Gold	Silver	Bronze	Total	Rank
2000 Sydney	37	24	32	93	1
2004 Athens	36	39	26	101	1
2008 Beijing	36	39	37	112	2
2012 London	48	26	30	104	1
2016 Rio de Janeiro	46	37	38	121	1
2020 Tokyo	39	41	33	113	1
2024 Paris	40	44	42	126	1

== See also ==
- United States at the Olympics
- United States at the Winter Olympics
- List of United States Olympic medalists
