= 200-metre backstroke at the Olympics =

Olympic sport

200 metre backstroke at the Olympic Games
- Swimming pictogram

Overview
- Sport: Swimming
- Gender: Men and women
- Years held: Men: 1900, 1964–2024; Women: 1968–2024

Reigning champion
- Men: Hubert Kós (HUN)
- Women: Kaylee McKeown (AUS)

The 200-metre backstroke event is an event held at the Summer Olympic Games. The men's event was introduced in 1900, then was not held again until 1964, with a 100-metre backstroke) held from 1904 to 1960. When the event returned in 1964, it replaced the men's 100-metre backstroke for that year; in 1968, both the 100- and 200-metre versions were held for men. The 200-metre backstroke has been held at every Summer Games since 1964. The women's backstroke was introduced in 1968, and it has been held at every Summer Olympics since.

== Medals ==
=== Men's medals ===
Games	Gold	Silver	Bronze
1896 Athens	Not held		
1900 Paris	Ernst Hoppenberg; Germany	Karl Ruberl; Austria	Johannes Drost; Netherlands
1904 St. Louis	Not held		
1908 London	Not held		
1912 Stockholm	Not held		
1920 Antwerp	Not held		
1924 Paris	Not held		
1928 Amsterdam	Not held		
1932 Los Angeles	Not held		
1936 Berlin	Not held		
1948 London	Not held		
1952 Helsinki	Not held		
1956 Melbourne	Not held		
1960 Rome	Not held		
1964 Tokyo	Jed Graef; United States	Gary Dilley; United States	John Nelson; United States
1968 Mexico City	Roland Matthes; East Germany	Mitch Ivey; United States	Jack Horsley; United States
1972 Munich	Roland Matthes; East Germany	Mike Stamm; United States	Mitch Ivey; United States
1976 Montreal	John Naber; United States	Peter Rocca; United States	Dan Harrigan; United States
1980 Moscow	Sándor Wladár; Hungary	Zoltán Verrasztó; Hungary	Mark Kerry; Australia
1984 Los Angeles	Rick Carey; United States	Frédéric Delcourt; France	Cameron Henning; Canada
1988 Seoul	Igor Polyansky; Soviet Union	Frank Baltrusch; East Germany	Paul Kingsman; New Zealand
1992 Barcelona	Martín López-Zubero; Spain	Vladimir Selkov; Unified Team	Stefano Battistelli; Italy
1996 Atlanta	Brad Bridgewater; United States	Tripp Schwenk; United States	Emanuele Merisi; Italy
2000 Sydney	Lenny Krayzelburg; United States	Aaron Peirsol; United States	Matt Welsh; Australia
2004 Athens	Aaron Peirsol; United States	Markus Rogan; Austria	Răzvan Florea; Romania
2008 Beijing	Ryan Lochte; United States	Aaron Peirsol; United States	Arkady Vyatchanin; Russia
2012 London	Tyler Clary; United States	Ryosuke Irie; Japan	Ryan Lochte; United States
2016 Rio de Janeiro	Ryan Murphy; United States	Mitch Larkin; Australia	Evgeny Rylov; Russia
2020 Tokyo	Evgeny Rylov; ROC	Ryan Murphy; United States	Luke Greenbank; Great Britain
2024 Paris	Hubert Kós; Hungary	Apostolos Christou; Greece	Roman Mityukov; Switzerland

==== Men's multiple medalists ====
Rank	Swimmer	Nation	Olympics	Gold	Silver	Bronze	Total
1	Roland Matthes	East Germany	1968–1972	2	0	0	2
2	Aaron Peirsol	United States	2000–2008	1	2	0	3
3	Ryan Murphy	United States	2016–2020	1	1	0	2
4	Ryan Lochte	United States	2008–2012	1	0	1	2
5	Mitch Ivey	United States	1968–1972	0	1	1	2

==== Men's medalists by nation ====
Rank	Nation	Gold	Silver	Bronze	Total
1	United States	9	8	5	22
2	East Germany	2	1	0	3
2	Hungary	2	1	0	3
4	Germany	1	0	0	1
4	Soviet Union	1	0	0	1
4	Spain	1	0	0	1
4	ROC	1	0	0	1
8	Austria	0	2	0	2
9	Australia	0	1	2	3
10	France	0	1	0	1
10	Japan	0	1	0	1
10	Unified Team	0	1	0	1
10	Greece	0	1	0	1
14	Italy	0	0	2	2
14	Russia	0	0	2	2
16	Canada	0	0	1	1
16	Netherlands	0	0	1	1
16	New Zealand	0	0	1	1
16	Romania	0	0	1	1
16	Great Britain	0	0	1	1
16	Switzerland	0	0	1	1

=== Women's medals ===
Games	Gold	Silver	Bronze
1968 Mexico City	Lillian Watson; United States	Elaine Tanner; Canada	Kaye Hall; United States
1972 Munich	Melissa Belote; United States	Susie Atwood; United States	Donna Gurr; Canada
1976 Montreal	Ulrike Richter; East Germany	Birgit Treiber; East Germany	Nancy Garapick; Canada
1980 Moscow	Rica Reinisch; East Germany	Cornelia Polit; East Germany	Birgit Treiber; East Germany
1984 Los Angeles	Jolanda de Rover; Netherlands	Amy White; United States	Anca Pătrășcoiu; Romania
1988 Seoul	Krisztina Egerszegi; Hungary	Kathrin Zimmermann; East Germany	Cornelia Sirch; East Germany
1992 Barcelona	Krisztina Egerszegi; Hungary	Dagmar Hase; Germany	Nicole Stevenson; Australia
1996 Atlanta	Krisztina Egerszegi; Hungary	Whitney Hedgepeth; United States	Cathleen Rund; Germany
2000 Sydney	Diana Mocanu; Romania	Roxana Maracineanu; France	Miki Nakao; Japan
2004 Athens	Kirsty Coventry; Zimbabwe	Stanislava Komarova; Russia	Reiko Nakamura; Japan Antje Buschschulte; Germany
2008 Beijing	Kirsty Coventry; Zimbabwe	Margaret Hoelzer; United States	Reiko Nakamura; Japan
2012 London	Missy Franklin; United States	Anastasia Zuyeva; Russia	Elizabeth Beisel; United States
2016 Rio de Janeiro	Maya DiRado; United States	Katinka Hosszú; Hungary	Hilary Caldwell; Canada
2020 Tokyo	Kaylee McKeown; Australia	Kylie Masse; Canada	Emily Seebohm; Australia
2024 Paris	Kaylee McKeown; Australia	Regan Smith; United States	Kylie Masse; Canada

==== Women's multiple medalists ====
Rank	Swimmer	Nation	Olympics	Gold	Silver	Bronze	Total
1	Krisztina Egerszegi	Hungary	1988–1996	3	0	0	3
2	Kirsty Coventry	Zimbabwe	2004–2008	2	0	0	2
2	Kaylee McKeown	Australia	2020–2024	2	0	0	2
4	Birgit Treiber	East Germany	1976–1980	0	1	1	2
4	Kylie Masse	Canada	2020–2024	0	1	1	2
6	Reiko Nakamura	Japan	2004–2008	0	0	2	2

==== Women's medalists by nation ====
Rank	Nation	Gold	Silver	Bronze	Total
1	United States	4	5	2	11
2	Hungary	3	1	0	4
3	East Germany	2	3	2	7
4	Australia	2	0	2	4
5	Zimbabwe	2	0	0	2
6	Romania	1	0	1	2
7	Netherlands	1	0	0	1
8	Canada	0	1	2	3
9	Russia	0	2	0	2
10	Germany	0	1	2	3
11	France	0	1	0	1
12	Japan	0	0	3	3
