= Johannes Bloemen =

Dutch swimmer

Personal information
- Full name: Johannes Dirk Bloemen
- Born: 26 May 1864 Amsterdam, Netherlands
- Died: 15 March 1939 (aged 74) Alkmaar, Netherlands
- Height: 165 cm (5 ft 5 in)

Sport
- Sport: Swimming
- Strokes: Backstroke
- Club: Koninklijke Amsterdamsche Zwemclub 1870

Johannes Bloemen (26 May 1864 – 15 March 1939) was a Dutch swimmer. He competed in the men's 200 metre backstroke at the 1900 Summer Olympics.
