= Swimming at the 1900 Summer Olympics – Men's 200 metre backstroke =

Men's 200 metre backstroke at the Games of the II Olympiad
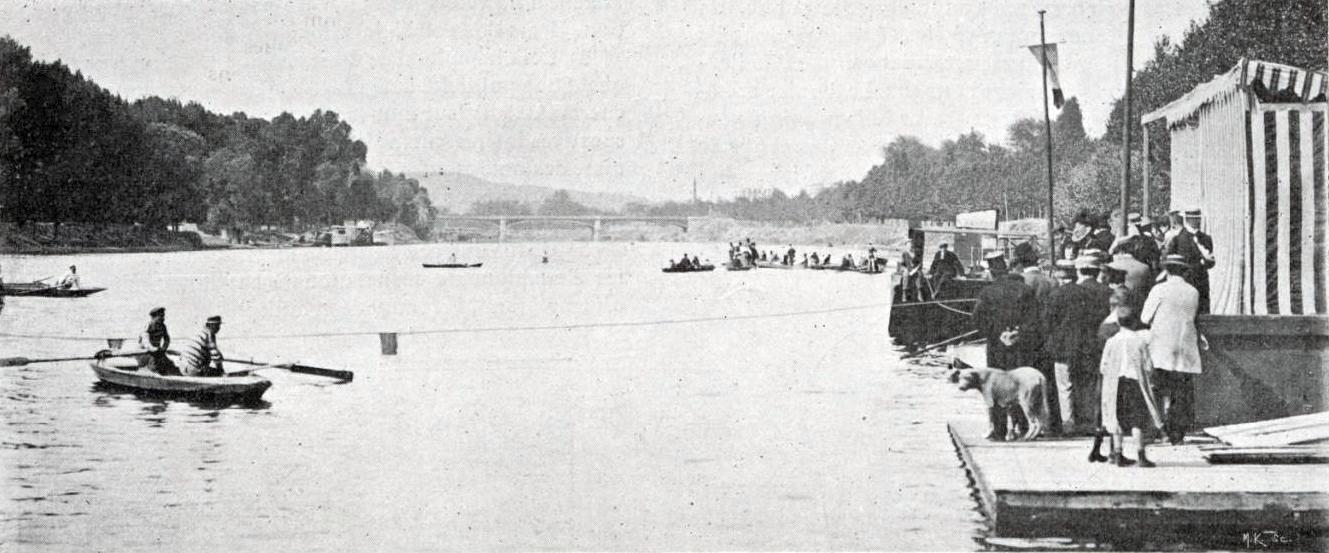
- The swimming venue in 1900
- Venue: River Seine
- Dates: August 11 (semifinals); August 12 (final)
- Competitors: 16 from 7 nations
- Winning time: 2:47.0 OR

Medalists
1st place, gold medalist(s)		Ernst Hoppenberg; Germany
2nd place, silver medalist(s)		Karl Ruberl; Austria
3rd place, bronze medalist(s)		Johannes Drost; Netherlands

The men's 200 metre backstroke was an event on the Swimming at the 1900 Summer Olympics schedule in Paris. It was the first Olympic swimming event to not be a freestyle competition. It was held on 11 August and 12 August 1900. 16 swimmers from 7 nations competed. The event was won by Ernst Hoppenberg of Germany, with Karl Ruberl of Austria second and Johannes Drost of the Netherlands third.

== Background ==
This was the first appearance of the 200 metre backstroke event. The event did not return until 1964; since then, it has been on the programme at every Summer Games. From 1904 to 1960, a men's 100 metre backstroke was held instead. In 1964, only the 200 metres was held. Beginning in 1968 and ever since, both the 100 and 200 metre versions have been held.

Before the Games, Great Britain's Robert Crawshaw was described in The New York Herald Tribune as the "champion breast and back swimmer of the world".

== Competition format ==
The competition used a two-round format, with semifinals and a final. The entrants were divided into three semifinals; each semifinal had approximately 12 swimmers entered, though withdrawals left each with between 3 and 7 swimmers. The fastest swimmer in each semifinal advanced to the final along with the next seven fastest times overall. This resulted in a 10-swimmer final.

The races were swum downstream in the Seine.

== Records ==
There were no recognized records in the 200 metre backstroke before this competition: world records would not be recognized until 1909.

Ernst Hoppenberg had the best time in the first semifinal at 2:54.4, setting the initial Olympic record. He beat his own time in the final, at 2:47.0, for a record that stood for 64 years, until the next time the event was held (when Bob Bennett broke it by over 30 seconds, with a 2:16.1 in the first heat).

== Schedule ==
Date	Time	Round
Sunday, 11 August 1900	11:00	Semifinals
Sunday, 12 August 1900	15:30	Final

== Results ==
=== Semifinals ===
In the first round, there were three semifinals. The winner of each semifinal advanced to the final, as did the seven fastest losers from across all the semifinals. The semifinals were held on 11 August.

==== Semifinal 1 ====
Rank	Swimmer	Nation	Time	Notes
1	Ernst Hoppenberg	Germany	2:54.4	Q, OR
2	Robert Crawshaw	Great Britain	3:15.0	Q
3	Bill Burgess	Great Britain	3:50.4	Q
4	Paolo Bussetti	Italy	4:09.2	Q
5	Lapostolet	France	4:34.6	
6	Fumouze	France	5:17.0	

==== Semifinal 2 ====
Rank	Swimmer	Nation	Time	Notes
1	Johannes Bloemen	Netherlands	3:09.2	Q
2	de Romand	France	3:56.6	Q
3	Chevrand	France	4:42.0	

==== Semifinal 3 ====
Rank	Swimmer	Nation	Time	Notes
1	Karl Ruberl	Austria	2:56.0	Q
2	Johannes Drost	Netherlands	3:10.2	Q
3	Jean Leuilliux	France	3:10.2	Q
4	Erik Erickson	Sweden	4:05.4	Q
5	Lué	France	4:10.0	
6	Pierre Peyrusson	France	4:15.6	
7	Texier	France	4:49.0	

=== Final ===
The final was held on 12 August.

Rank	Swimmer	Nation	Time	Notes
1st place, gold medalist(s)	Ernst Hoppenberg	Germany	2:47.0	OR
2nd place, silver medalist(s)	Karl Ruberl	Austria	2:56.0	
3rd place, bronze medalist(s)	Johannes Drost	Netherlands	3:01.0	
4	Johannes Bloemen	Netherlands	3:02.2	
5	Bill Burgess	Great Britain	3:12.0	
6	de Romand	France	3:38.0	
7	Paolo Bussetti	Italy	3:45.0	
8	Erik Erickson	Sweden	3:56.4	
—	Robert Crawshaw	Great Britain	DNF	
—	Jean Leuillieux	France	DNF	

== Results summary ==
Rank	Swimmer	Nation	Semifinals	Final	Notes
1st place, gold medalist(s)	Ernst Hoppenberg	Germany	2:54.4	2:47.0	OR
2nd place, silver medalist(s)	Karl Ruberl	Austria	2:56.0	2:56.0	
3rd place, bronze medalist(s)	Johannes Drost	Netherlands	3:10.2	3:01.0	
4	Johannes Bloemen	Netherlands	3:09.2	3:02.2	
5	Bill Burgess	Great Britain	3:50.4	3:12.0	
6	de Romand	France	3:56.6	3:38.0	
7	Paolo Bussetti	Italy	4:09.2	3:45.0	
8	Erik Erickson	Sweden	4:05.4	3:56.4	
9	Robert Crawshaw	Great Britain	3:15.0	DNF	
9	Jean Leuillieux	France	3:10.2	DNF	
11	Lué	France	4:10.0	Did not advance	
12	Pierre Peyrusson	France	4:15.6	Did not advance	
13	Lapostolet	France	4:34.6	Did not advance	
14	Chevrand	France	4:42.0	Did not advance	
15	Texier	France	4:49.0	Did not advance	
16	Fumouze	France	5:17.0	Did not advance	
