= Backstroke =

Swimming style in which one swims on one's back

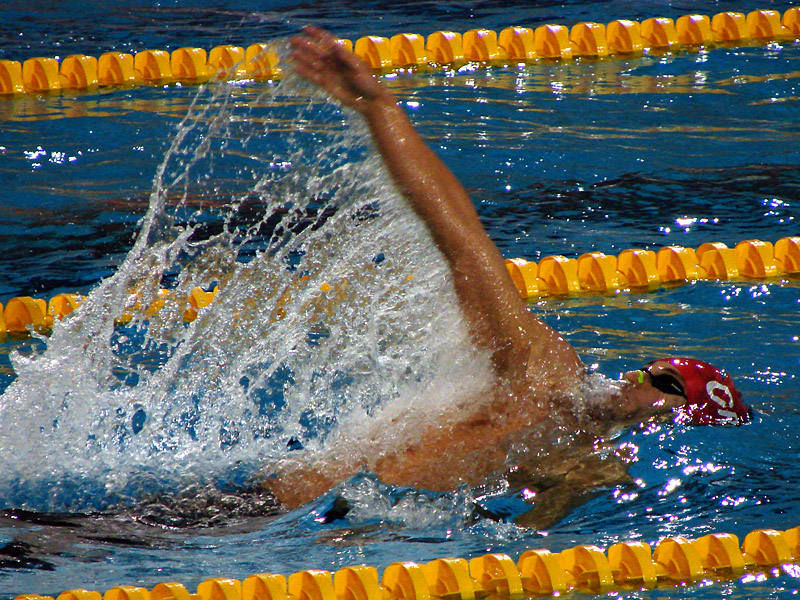
Gordan Kožulj swimming backstroke at 2008 Euros

Backstroke or back crawl is one of the four swimming styles used in competitive events regulated by FINA, and the only one of these styles swum on the back. This swimming style has the advantage of easy breathing, but the disadvantage of swimmers not being able to see where they are going. It also has a different start from the other three competition swimming styles. The swimming style is similar to an upside down front crawl or freestyle. Both backstroke and front crawl are long-axis strokes. In individual medley backstroke is the second style swum; in the medley relay it is the first style swum.

== History ==
Backstroke is an ancient style of swimming, popularized by Harry Hebner. It was the second stroke to be swum in competitions after the front crawl. The first Olympic backstroke competition was the 1900 Paris Olympics men's 200 meter.

== Technique ==
In the initial position, the swimmer performing backstroke lies flat on the back; arms stretched with extended fingertips, and legs extended backwards.

=== Arm movement ===
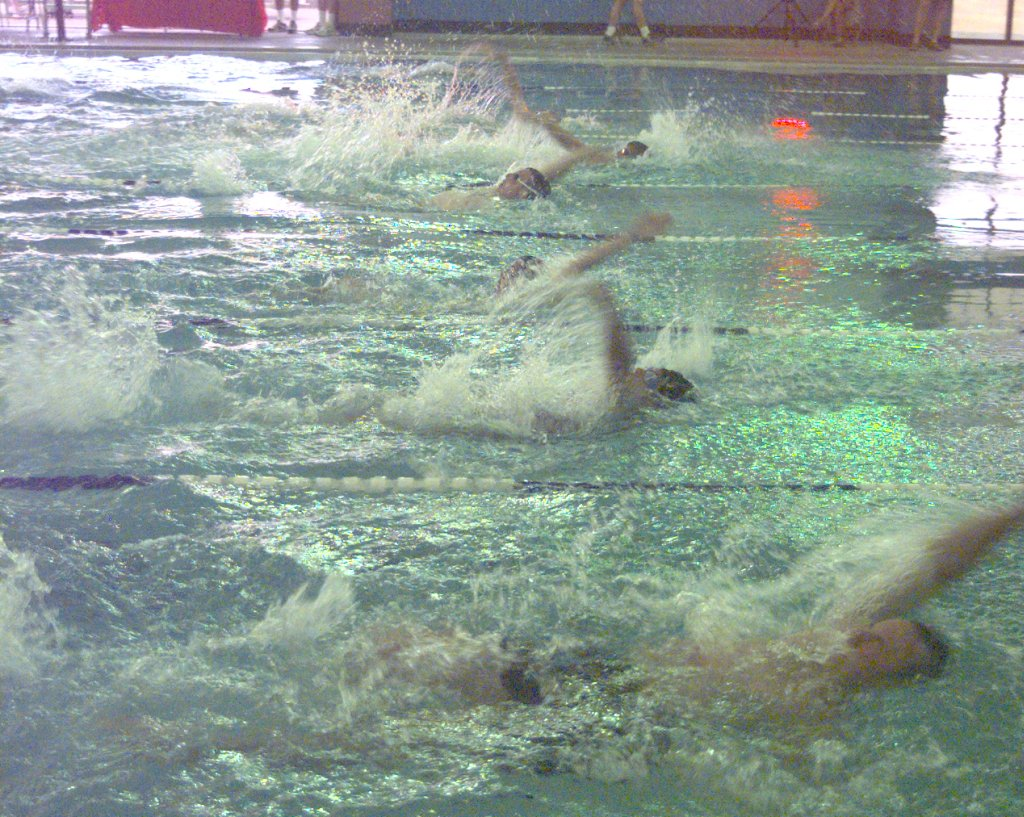
Backstroke swimming (amateur competition, non-optimal style)

In backstroke, the arms contribute most of the forward movement. The arm stroke consists of two main parts: the power phase (consisting of three separate parts) and the recovery. The arms alternate so that one arm is always underwater while the other arm is recovering. One complete arm turn is considered one cycle. From the initial position, one arm sinks slightly under water and turns the palm outward to start the catch phase (first part of the power phase). The hand enters downward (pinkie finger first) then pulling out at a 45-degree angle, catching the water.

During the power phase the hand follows a semi-circular path from the catch to the side of the hip. The palm is always facing away from the swimming direction, while remaining straight as an extension of the arm, and the elbow always points downward towards the bottom of the pool. This is done so that both the arms and the elbow can push the maximum amount of water back in order to push the body forward. At the height of the shoulders, the upper and lower arms should have their maximum angle of about 90 degrees. This is called the Mid-Pull of the power phase.

The Mid-Pull phase consists of pushing the palm of the hand as far down as possible with the fingers pointing upward. Again, the goal is to push the body forward against the water. At the very end of the Mid-Pull, the palm flaps down for a last push forward down to a depth of 45 cm, creating the finish of the power phase. Besides pushing the body forward, this also helps with the rolling back to the other side as part of the body movement. During the power phase, the fingers of the hand can be slightly apart, as this will increase the resistance of the hand in the water due to turbulence.

To prepare for the recovery phase, the hand is rotated so that the palms point towards the legs and the thumb side points upwards. At the beginning of the recovery phase of the one arm, the other arm begins its power phase. The recovering arm is moved in a semicircle straight over the shoulders to the front. During this recovery, the palm rotates so that the small finger enters the water first, allowing for the least amount of resistance, and the palms point outward. After a short gliding phase, the cycle repeats with the preparation for the next power phase.

==== Variants ====
A variant is to move both arms synchronized and not alternating, similar to an upside down breast stroke. This is easier to coordinate, and the peak speed during the combined power phase is faster, yet the speed is much slower during the combined recovery. The average speed will usually be less than the average speed of the alternating stroke. This stroke is commonly called the elementary backstroke. This elementary backstroke swim was used in the 1900 and 1908 Olympics. The backcrawl swim supplanted the elementary backstroke swim after 1908 as the competitive back swim and it is now referred to as the backstroke.

Another variant is the old style of swimming backstroke, where the arm movement formed a complete circle in a windmill type pattern. However, this style is not commonly used for competitive swimming, as a lot of energy is spent on pushing the body up and down instead of forward. Furthermore, the added strain on the shoulder is considered less than ideal and can lead to injuries.

It is also possible to move only one arm at a time (paused stroke), where one arm moves through the power and recovery phases while the other arm rests. This is slow, but it is used frequently to teach students the movement, as they have to concentrate on only one arm. This drill technique can work well with the swimmer holding a float, however it is important not to overuse this drill as a "paused stroke" can easily become habitual and can be challenging to unlearn.

=== Leg movement ===
The leg movement in backstroke is similar to the flutter kick in front crawl. The kick makes a large contribution to the forward speed, while significantly stabilizing the body.

The leg stroke alternates, with one leg sinking down straight to about 30 degrees. From this position, the leg makes a fast kick upward, slightly bending the knee at the beginning and then stretching it again in the horizontal. However, there are also frequent variants with four or only two kicks per cycle. Usually, sprinters tend to use 6 kicks per cycle, whereas long-distance swimmers may use fewer.

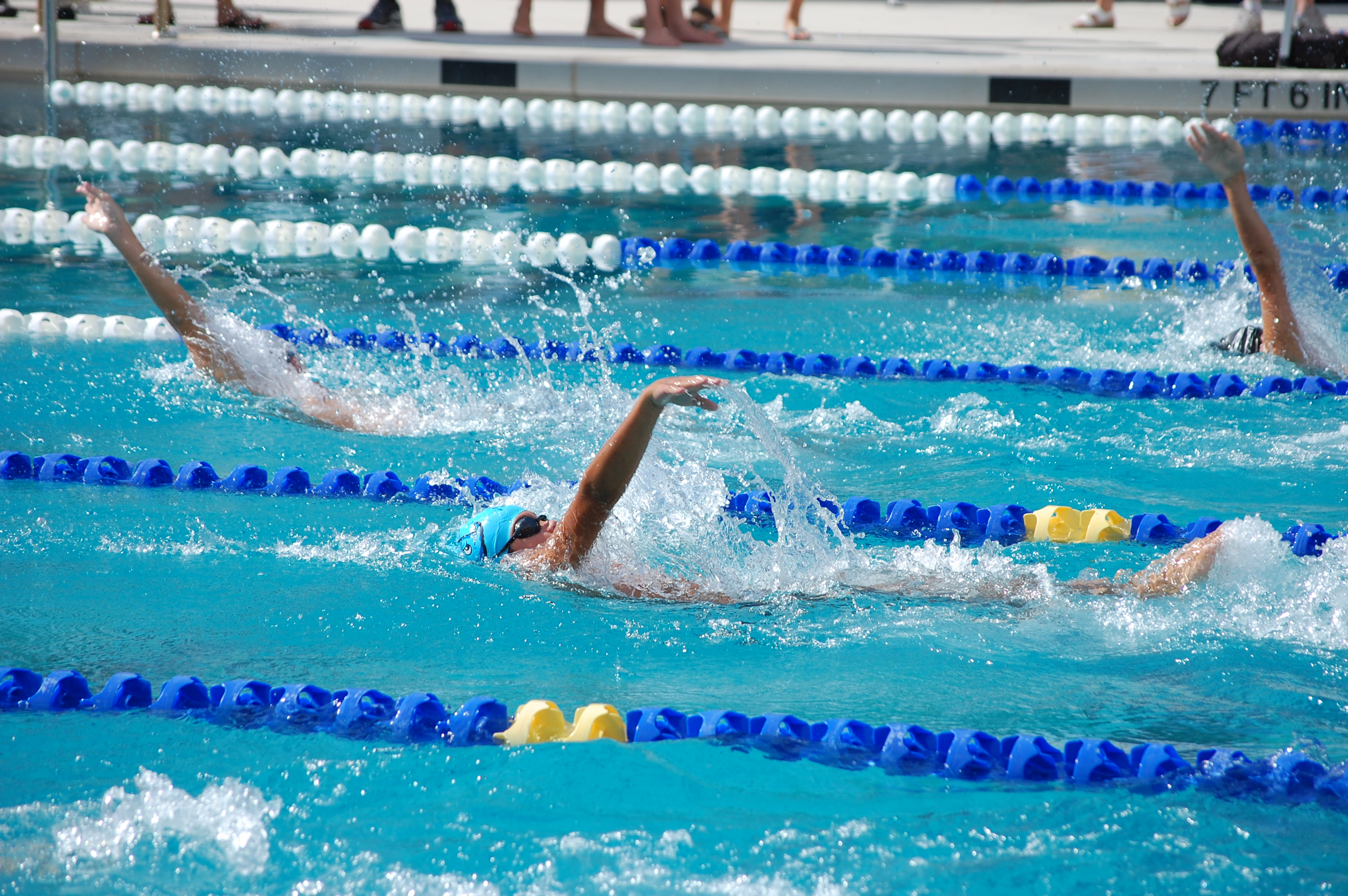
Amateur backstroke

==== Variants ====
It is also possible to use a butterfly kick, although this is rare except after the initial start and after turns. The dolphin kick is essential for many top athletes because it is the fastest part of the race. It may also constitute the majority of the race (i.e., in the 100 yard backstroke the swimmer may kick underwater dolphin for 15 yards per length which equates to as much as 60 yards kicking in a 100 yd race). A great example of this is Olympic gold medallist Natalie Coughlin. Breaststroke kicks are most comfortable if the arms are used synchronized, as the breaststroke kick makes it more difficult to compensate for the rolling movement with alternating arm cycles. The butterfly kick can be done slightly to one side depending on the rolling motion of the body.

=== Breathing ===
Breathing in backstroke is easier than in other strokes, as the mouth and nose are usually above water. Competitive swimmers breathe in through the mouth during the recovery of one arm, and breathe out through the mouth and nose during the pull and push phase of the same arm. This is done to clear the nose of water.

=== Body movement ===
Due to the asynchronous movement of the arms, the body tends to roll around its long axis. By taking advantage of this rolling motion, swimmers can increase their effectiveness while swimming backstroke. The overall position of the body is straight in the horizontal to reduce drag. Beginners frequently let their posterior and thighs sink too low, which increases drag. To avoid this, the upper legs have to be moved to the extreme down position at each kick even with a little help by the back and the foot tips have to be fixed in the extreme lower position and the head is held out of the water to act as a counter-weight.

=== Start ===
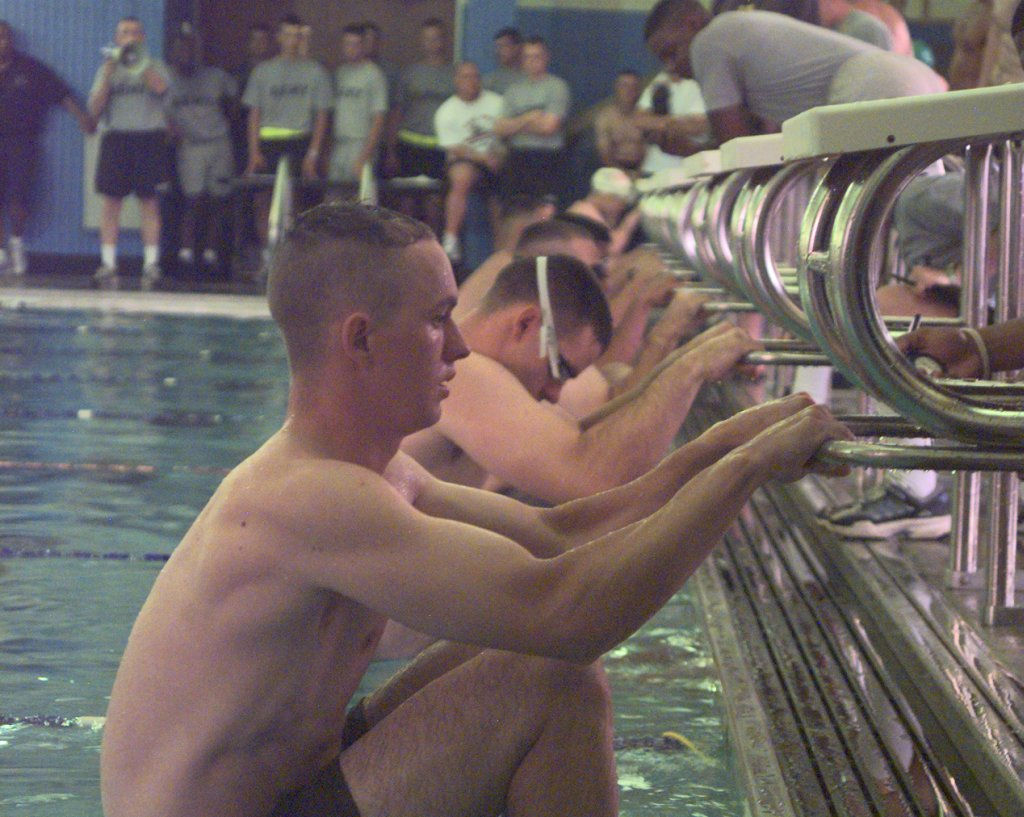
Backstroke start, waiting for the signal

The backstroke start is the only start from the water. The swimmer faces the wall and grabs part of the start block or the wall with their hands. Ideally, there are grips on the block for this purpose. The legs are placed shoulder width apart on the wall with both heels slightly off the wall. Just before the starting signal, the swimmer pulls their head closer to the start block, while keeping the knees bent at a 90-degree angle. Some swimmers prefer to keep one foot slightly lower than the other during the start.

For the takeoff, the swimmer pushes their hands away from the block and swings their arms around sideways to the front. At the same time, the swimmer throws their head to the back. The swimmer then pushes away from the wall with their feet. Ideally, the swimmer's back is arched during the airborne phase so that only the feet and the hands touch the water while the rest of the body is above the water line. This reduces drag and permits a faster start. On September 21, 2005, FINA modified the backstroke start rule regarding toes below the water line. The feet can now be above the water, but not above or curled over the lip of the pool gutter.

After the start, the swimmer is completely underwater. Due to increased resistance at the surface, experienced swimmers usually swim faster underwater than at the surface. Therefore, most experienced swimmers in backstroke competitions stay under water up to the limit set by FINA (15 meters after the start and after every turn). Most swimmers use a butterfly kick underwater, as this provides more forward movement than the flutter kick. The underwater phase includes the risk of water entering the nose, so most swimmers breathe out through the nose to stop water from entering.

The swimmer's head must break the surface before 15 m under FINA rules. The swimmer starts swimming with one arm, followed by the other arm with half a cycle delay. The swimmer continues in regular swimming style, staying on the back for the entire time except the turns.

=== Turn and finish ===
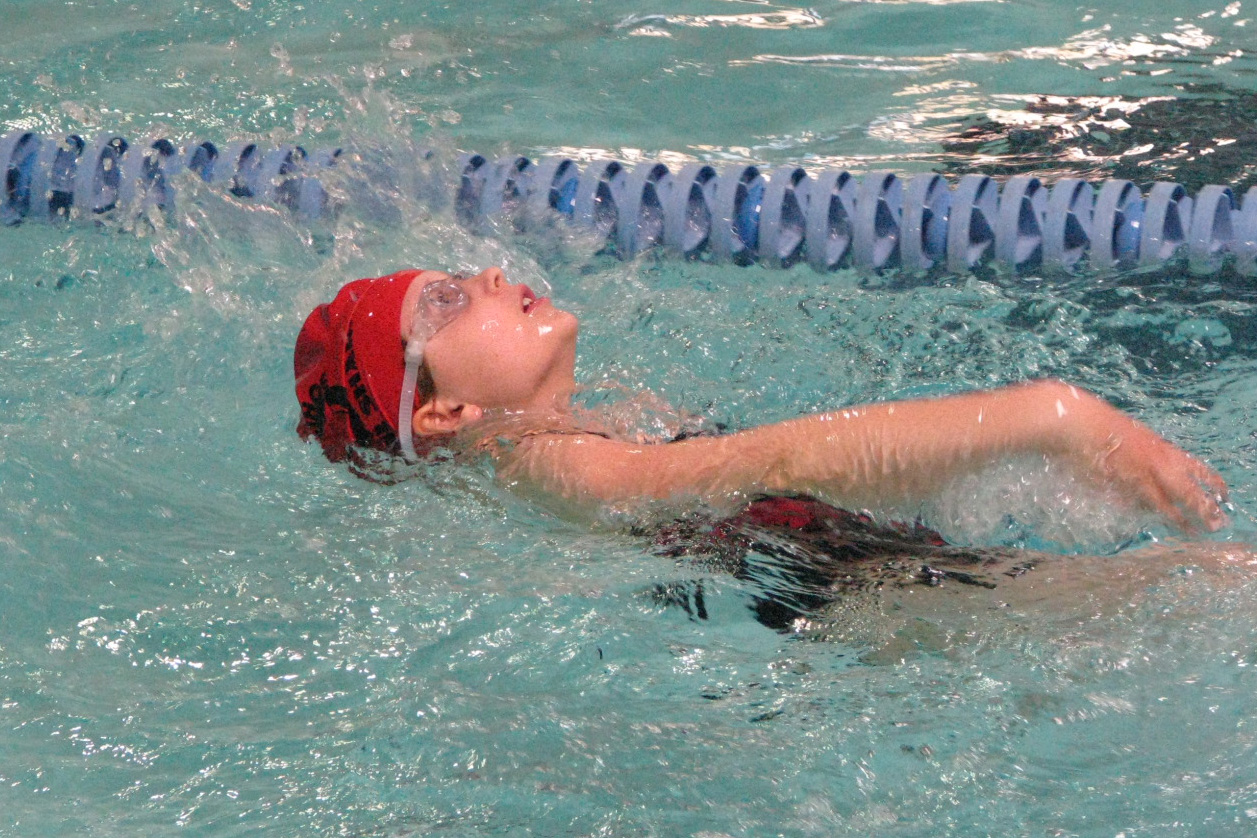
A swimmer focuses on the ceiling while doing the backstroke.

Approaching the wall presents swimmers with the problem of not seeing where they are going. Most competitive swimmers know how many strokes they need for a lane, or at least how many strokes after the signal flags or the change in color of the separating lines. Turning the head is also possible, but slows the swimmer down.

Prior to September 1992 swimmers had to touch the wall on their back before initiating the turn or rolling off their back in order to turn. After September 1992 when approaching the wall, the swimmer is allowed to turn to their breast and make one push/pull phase with one arm or simultaneous double arm pull. Next, the swimmer makes half a tumble turn forward, resting the feet against the wall. The arms are in the forward position at this time, and the swimmer pushes their body off the wall. Similar to the start, the swimmer can remain up to 15 m under water, with most swimmers using a butterfly kick for speed. This rule change allowed for faster turns.

For the finish, the swimmer must touch the wall while lying on their back, less than 90 degrees out of the horizontal, and must not be completely submerged. 2020 USA Swimming Rulebook, 101.4 BACKSTROKE, Finish — Upon the finish of the race, the swimmer must touch the wall while on the back.

== Competitions ==
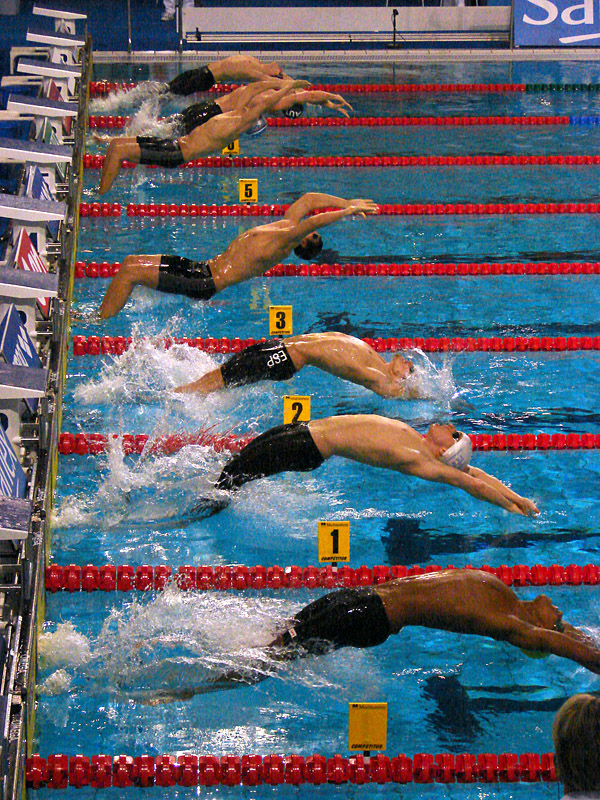
Backstroke start at 2008 Euros.

There are three common distances swum in competitive backstroke swimming, both over either a long course (50 m pool) or a short course (25 m pool). The United States also employs short-course yards (25-yard pool).

- 50 m backstroke
- 100 m backstroke
- 200 m backstroke

Other distances are also swum on occasions.

Backstroke is also part of the medley over the following distances:

- 100 m individual medley (short course 25 m pool only)
- 200 m individual medley
- 400 m individual medley
- 4 × 100 m medley relay

Below are the official FINA rules which apply to swimmers during official competitions.

- Before the starting signal, the swimmers shall line up in the water facing the starting end, with both hands holding the starting grips. Standing in or on the gutter or bending the toes over the lip of the gutter is prohibited.
- At the signal for starting and after turning, the swimmer shall push off and swim upon his back throughout the race except when executing a turn as set forth in SW 6.4. The normal position on the back can include a roll movement of the body up to, but not including 90 degrees from horizontal. The position of the head is not relevant.
- Some part of the swimmer must break the surface of the water throughout the race. It shall be permissible for the swimmer to be completely submerged during the turn, and for a distance of not more than 15 meters after the start and each turn. By that point, the head must have broken the surface.
- During the turn, the shoulders may be turned over the vertical to the breast after which a continuous single arm pull or a continuous simultaneous double arm pull may be used to initiate the turn. Once the body has left the position on the back, any kick or arm pull must be part of the continuous turning action. The swimmer must have returned to the position on the back upon leaving the wall. When executing the turn there must be a touch of the wall with some part of the swimmer's body.
- Upon the finish of the race, the swimmer must touch the wall while on the back in his/her respective lane. Competitive swimmers frequently swing their arm back and down into the water, bringing the head and upper body with it. This creates a large amount of forward momentum into the wall. A single dolphin kick can be used to keep the some part of the swimmer above water, and therefore, legal.

== See also ==
- List of world records in swimming
- Victory backstroke
