= Bloom (surname) =

Bloom is a surname. Notable people with the surname include:

- Adam Bloom (born 1970), English comedian
- Alan Bloom (1906–2005), English nurseryman
- Allan Bloom (1930–1992), American philosopher and author
- Alexis Bloom, South African documentary filmmaker
- Andy Bloom (born 1973), American shot putter
- Arthur Bloom
  - Arthur Bloom (physician) (1930–1992), Welsh physician who focused on haemophilia
  - Arthur Bloom (geologist) (Arthur L. Bloom; 1928-2017), geomorphologist
  - Arthur Bloom (musician), American composer and pianist
- Barry Bloom (1937–2026), American immunologist and academic
- Becca Bloom, American entrepreneur and social media influencer
- Benjamin Bloom (1913–1999), American educator
- Benjamin Bloom (musician) (born 1982), English musician
- Bill Bloom (born 1948), American songwriter and musician
- Bobby Bloom (1946–1974), American singer-songwriter
- Brian Bloom (born 1970), American actor, voice actor and screenwriter
- Calvin Bloom (born 1994), American professional wrestler also known as "Von Wagner"
- Chaim Bloom (born 1983), American Baseball Executive
- Claire Bloom (born 1931), British actress
- D. Dudley Bloom (1922–2015), American businessman
- David Bloom (1963–2003), NBC journalist
- David P. Bloom (born 1964), American fraudster
- Doris Bloom (born 1954), South African painter
- Eric Bloom (born 1944), American musician, singer and songwriter
- Floyd E. Bloom (1936–2025), American medical researcher
- Gary Bloom, British sports commentator
- Gilad Bloom (born 1967), Israeli tennis player
- Godfrey Bloom (born 1949), British economist and politician
- Harold Bloom (1930–2019), American literary critic
- Harry Bloom (1913–1981), South African novelist and activist
- Howard Bloom (born 1943), American author
- Hyman Bloom (1913–2009), American artist
- Jeremiah B. Bloom (1913–1983), New York state senator
- Jeremy Bloom (born 1982), American athlete
- John Bloom (disambiguation), several people
- Kirsten Bloom, American ballet dancer and actress
- Lewis Bloom, member of the Kansas House of Representatives
- Leyna Bloom, American fashion model, dancer, and transgender activist
- Lily Bloom, French actress
- Louis A. Bloom (1900–1988), American politician and judge
- Lucy Bloom (born 1973), South African businesswoman
- Luka Bloom (born 1955), Irish musician
- Mark Bloom (born 1987), American soccer defender
- Matt Bloom (born 1972), American wrestler
- Molly Bloom (born 1978), American author
- Moses Bloom (1833–1893), American politician, mayor of Iowa City
- Myer Bloom (1928–2016), Canadian physicist
- Orlando Bloom (born 1977), English actor
- Paul Bloom (born 1963), Canadian-American psychologist
- Philip Bloom (disambiguation), several people
- Prescott E. Bloom (1942–1986), American politician and lawyer
- Rachel Bloom (born 1987), American actress
- Rube Bloom (1902–1976), American composer
- Ryan Alexander Bloom (born 1985), American musician and author
- Sahil Bloom (born 1991), American writer
- Sol Bloom (1870–1949) Member, U. S. House of Representatives (D-NY)
- Steve Bloom (born 1953), photographer
- Ursula Bloom (1892–1984), English writer
- Verna Bloom (1938–2019), American actress
- William Elijah Bloom (1860–1938), American politician
- Yescia Bloom (c. 1990-2017), Venezuelan model

== Fictional characters ==
- Apple Bloom, in the My Little Pony franchise
- Davis Bloome, in the TV series Smallville
- Leo Bloom, in Mel Brooks's 1967 comic film The Producers
- Leopold Bloom, in James Joyce's Ulysses
- Molly Bloom, in James Joyce's Ulysses
- Stuart Bloom, in the TV series The Big Bang Theory

== See also ==
- Bloomer (surname)
- Blum (surname)
