= Bloomer (surname) =

Bloomer is a surname. Notable people with the surname include:

- Amelia Bloomer (1818–1894), American political activist
- Ariel Bloomer (born 1989), American singer
- Asa S. Bloomer (1891–1963), American politician
- Boaz Bloomer (1801–1874), British businessman
- Daphne Bloomer (born 1973), American actress
- George Bloomer (disambiguation), multiple people
- Harold Bloomer (1902–1965), American fencer
- Hiram Reynolds Bloomer (1845–1910 or 1911), American painter
- James Bloomer (1880–1963), American football player
- Jimmy Bloomer (disambiguation), multiple people
- John H. Bloomer (1930–1995), American politician
- Jordyn Bloomer (born 1977), American soccer player
- Kent Bloomer (1935–2023), American sculptor
- Matthew Bloomer (born 1978), British football player
- Millard Bloomer (1899–1974), American fencer
- Raymond Bloomer (1897–1982), American actor
- Robert A. Bloomer (1921–1999), American politician
- Samuel Bloomer (1835–1917), American Civil War soldier
- Steve Bloomer (1874–1938), British football player
- Steve Bloomer (1909–1943), Australian Rules football player
- Thomas Bloomer (1894–1984), Irish bishop

== See also ==
- Bloom (surname)
- Bloomer (disambiguation)
- Bloomers
- Bloomers (TV series)
- Blumer
