= List of works by Carolus-Duran =

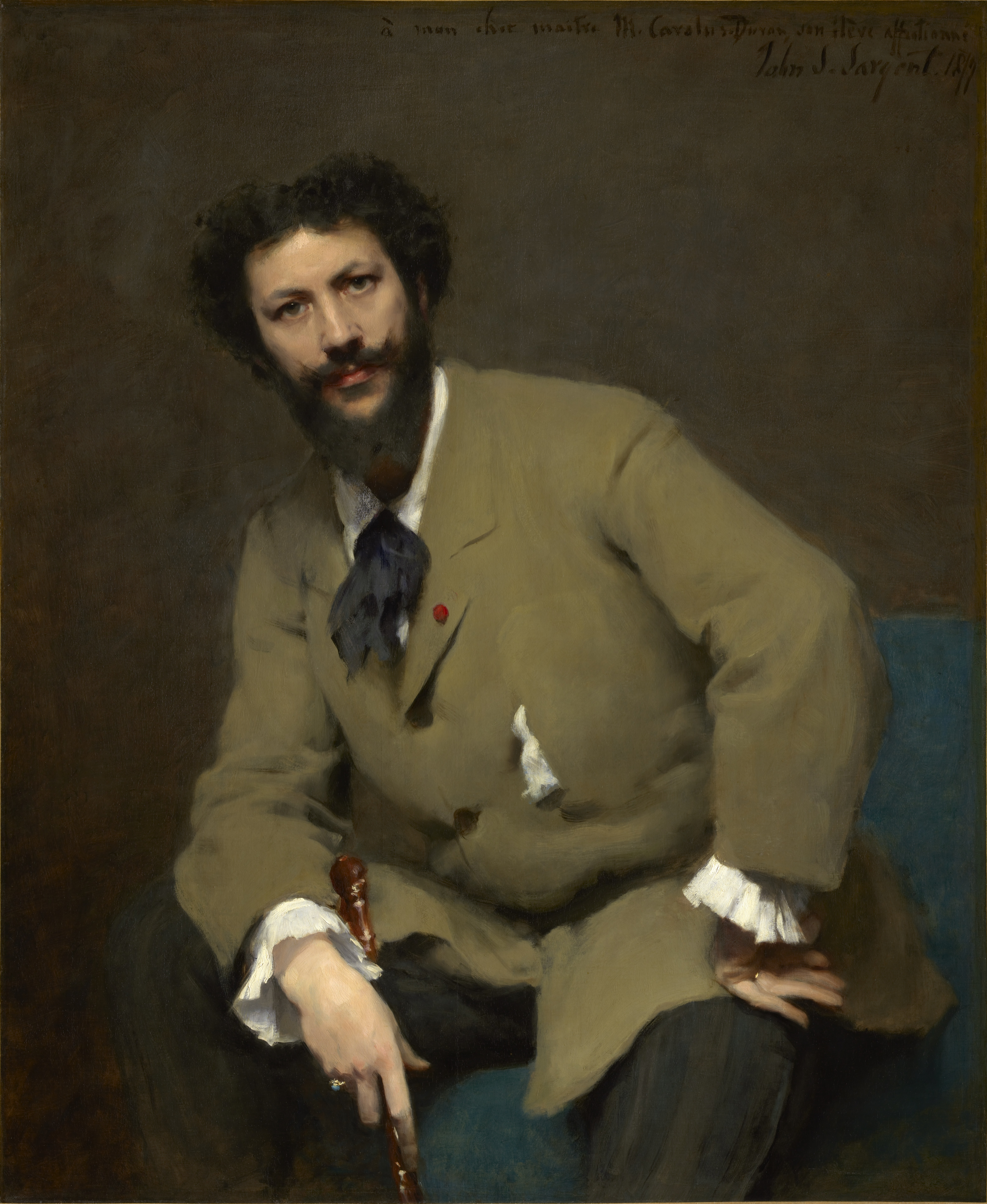
Portrait of Carolus-Duran by John Singer Sargent, 1879

Carolus-Duran was a French painter and art instructor known for his stylish depictions of members of high society in Third Republic France.

== Works ==
Painting	Name/Subject	Year	Type	Current Location
	Le Baiser (The Kiss) (Self-portrait with his wife as newlyweds)	1868	Portrait	Palais des Beaux-Arts de Lille
	The Lady with the Glove (modeled after his wife)	1869	Portrait	Musée d'Orsay
	Merrymakers	1870	Portrait	Detroit Institute of Arts
	Portrait of Mevrouw de Rute (née Marie Laetitia Bonaparte-Wyse)	1872	Portrait	Musée des Beaux-Arts d'Angers
	Portrait of Étienne Haro	1873	Portrait	Petit Palais
	Equestrian Portrait of Mademoiselle Croizette	1873	Portrait	MUba Eugène-Leroy
	The Artist's Daughter, Marie-Anne	1874	Portrait	Fine Arts Museums of San Francisco
	Madame Henry Fouquier	1876	Portrait	Private collection
	Mademoiselle de Lancey	1876	Portrait	Petit Palais
	Édouard Manet	1880	Portrait	Private collection
	Maria Pia of Savoy	1883	Portrait	Palace of Ajuda
	Study of a male head	1885	Study	National Museum in Warsaw
	Natalie at age ten	c. 1886–7	Portrait	Smithsonian American Art Museum
	The Poet with the Mandolin	1887	Portrait	
	Mrs. William Astor (Caroline Schermerhorn Astor) (Note: This painting was placed prominently in Mrs. Astor's Fifth Avenue house; she would stand in front of it when receiving guests for receptions.)	1890	Portrait	Metropolitan Museum of Art
	Portrait of Margaret Greville	1891	Portrait	Polesden Lacey (National Trust)
	Portrait of Emily Warren Roebling	c. 1896	Portrait	Brooklyn Museum
	Mother and Children (Madame Feydeau and Her Children)	1897	Portrait	National Museum of Western Art
	Marie-Anne as Madame Feydeau	1897	Portrait	Private collection
	Georges Feydeau	c. 1900	Portrait	Palais des Beaux-Arts de Lille
	Danae	c. 1900	Mythological painting	Musée des Beaux-Arts de Bordeaux
	Anna Gould	c. 1900	Portrait	
	Portrait of Augustus Gurnee	1910	Portrait	Petit Palais

== See also ==
- Carolus-Duran

== Notes and references ==
Notes
