= Symbolic behavior =

Capacity to use a system of symbols

Symbolic behavior is "a person’s capacity to respond to or use a system of significant symbols" (Faules & Alexander, 1978, p. 5). The symbolic behavior perspective argues that the reality of an organization is socially constructed through communication (Cheney & Christensen, 2000; Putnam, Phillips, & Chapman, 1996). Symbolic messages are used by individuals to understand their environment and create a social reality (Faules & Alexander, 1978; Mills, 2002). When faced with uncertainty, individuals continually organize themselves within their group-based reality and respond within that reality (Weick, 1995).

== History ==
Symbolic interactionism (SI), a phrase coined by Herbert Blumer as early as 1937, was derived from lectures of early philosophy and sociologist theorist George Herbert Mead's student notes. Mead's notes from a course he taught in social psychology were posthumously transcribed into the book Mind, Self, and Society; 1934. Mead, born in 1863, arguably laid the foundation for the symbolic interactionism concept of how the individual mind arises out of the social process. Mead's description of language as communication through significant symbols and concepts of "me" and "I" are examples of his contributions to the symbolic behavior perspective. Symbolic behavior perspective stems from symbolic interactionism perspective. Blumer (1962) summarizes the perspective as how people act towards things based on the meaning those things have for them. These meanings are derived from social interaction and modified through interpretation. The symbolic interactionism perspective relates to the organization by describing how employees form a concept of self in relationship to their organization as they interact with individuals, subordinates, and superiors within the organizational architecture. Individuals learn appropriate behavior within an organization as the code of values, roles, attitudes, and norms of behavior of that work environment become apparent (Wood, 1999).

== Symbolic behavior perspective viewpoints ==
The symbolic behavior perspective proposes that individuals face uncertainty when introduced to an organization. This uncertainty creates a reliance on symbolic messages so individuals can make sense of their environment (Brown, 1986). In order to reduce uncertainty, organizations create sets of standardized meanings depicted by symbols. As symbolic messages are interpreted by individuals, they react collectively within the organizational culture. As organizational cultures are learned, shared, and transmitted a collective social reality emerges (Harris & Nelson, 2008, p. 225). Organizational cultures are created and maintained by symbolic behavior, giving managers an opportunity to create, articulate, and sustain the organization's values as individuals focus on [shared values] (Colvin, 2000, p. F-9). The symbolic nature of shared values can also reduce ambiguity and tension within an organization (Harris & Nelson, 2008, p. 233). According to Mead's theory, a social act involves a three-part relationship: an initial gesture from one person, a response to that gesture by another, and a result. The result is what the act means for the communicator (Littlejohn & Foss, p. 160).

== Symbolic behavior perspective propositions ==
The above discussion can be summarized into 7 major propositions posited by the symbolic behavior perspective. The issues of complexity, uncertainty and organizing, cultural creation and maintenance, interpersonal reality, group behavior, leadership, and managing incongruences are addressed in the following propositions (Harris & Nelson, 2008, p. 222):

=== Complexity ===
Proposition 1: Organizational complexity creates a reliance on symbolic messages.

=== Uncertainty and organizing ===
Proposition 2: Uncertainty promotes a continual process of organizing.

=== Cultural creation and maintenance ===
Proposition 3: Symbolic behavior creates and maintains organizational cultures.

=== Interpersonal reality ===
Proposition 4: Symbols constitute the basis for interpersonal reality.

=== Group behavior ===
Proposition 5: Groups reaffirm the importance of symbolic behavior.

=== Leadership ===
Proposition 6: Leadership requires effective symbolic behavior.

=== Managing incongruences ===
Proposition 7: Incongruences and paradoxes are managed through acculturation.

== Tools of symbolic behavior ==
According to Harris & Nelson (2008, p. 237), tools consist of anything that provides symbolic meaning to people. Tools can be in the form of verbal or non-verbal communication.

=== Example communication tools ===
Stories/myths: As stories are continually repeated, they provide analogies for individuals and serve to guide behavior within the organization.

Titles: The use of titles communicates the relationship of the employee in correlation to the organization.

Slogans: Slogans can be used to reinforce established priorities or to bring attention to new priorities (Waterman, 1987).

Dress: Clothing is very important to an organization because it communicates culture (Remland, 2003). Because clothing can influence perceptions of both behavior and intent (Galin, 1990, p. 51), the dress code of an organization can impact their overall image.

Priorities: The priorities within an organization and the way they are carried out on a daily basis carry enormous impact. Individuals can better identify with the organization when management's priorities are in line with those of employees (Harris & Nelson, 2008, p. 238).

== Limitations of symbolic behavior ==
An over-reliance on symbolic activities can lead to significant problems. These include unethical manipulation, empty or meaningless actions, omnipresence, divisions, and unexpected interpretations (Harris & Nelson 2008, p. 239). Likewise, Blumer notes in advanced societies large group actions consist of highly recurrent, stable patterns that establish common, established meanings for the participants. Blumer heads a warning to bear in mind that new situations present problems requiring adjustment and redefinition (Littlejohn & Foss, p. 160).

=== Unethical manipulation ===
The use of gimmickry, using superficial pleasantness to cover up dishonest activities or intentions, providing misleading or incorrect advice regarding safety, or providing untrue explanations for behaviors are means used by unethical organizations, managers, or coworkers in order to obtain some advantage (Harris & Nelson 2008, p. 240).

=== Empty or meaningless actions ===
Without meaning individuals can get caught up in an activity trap, where styles gets substituted for substance (Robbins 1980). Diversity efforts are criticized for focusing more on comparative statistics generated by sporadic efforts and less on the nature of the issues a clearly thought-out strategic solution (Harris, 1997).

=== Omnipresence ===
Symbolic messages can prevent effective change or realistic responses to environmental demands. Cultures create identification and unity (Tompkins & Cheney, 1983), these trained incapacities can occur when values are strong or the culture's influence is too pervasive. Specifically, obsolescence, resistance to change, and inconsistency are the three risks posed by strong values (Deal & Kennedy, 1982). Strong cultures dictate roles and performances meaning individuals can be co-opted by the culture and its messages (Conrad, 1985). Mead called a gesture with shared meaning a "significant symbol", suggesting that once there is shared meaning the gesture takes on the value of a significant symbol (Littlejohn & Foss, p. 161).

=== Divisions ===
Symbols can create great divisions in an organization. Culture provides both division and unity, and the symbols used to reinforce the organization can create powerful social alienation between individuals and groups. Subcultures develop between managers and workers, blue and white collars, or factory and sales creating the potential for a “them versus us” environment (Harris & Nelson 2008, p. 243).

=== Unexpected interpretations ===
Can be unpredictable because individuals respond to symbolic behavior through their own frame of reference, attempts to use symbolism can have unintended results (Harris and Nelson 2008, p. 244). A judicious use of symbols is necessary or the wrong action based on the right intent can occur. A powerful sense of organizational pride can lead to dysfunctional responses by employees and managers (Harris & Nelson 2008, p. 244).

== Performances involved in symbolic behavior ==
A dramatistic perspective views individuals as actors "who creatively play, improvise, interpret, and re-present roles and scripts" (Conquergood, 1991, p. 187). Because the set of intangible activities that support the actual service itself provides a satisfying experience or a performance worth an increased financial burden (Pine & Gilmore, 1999).

=== Role performance ===
Learning to act out appropriate roles is a fundamental aspect of human development and important to organizational success (Harris & Nelson 2008, p. 244). One's own ability to use significant symbols to respond to one's self makes the thinking process possible.

=== Appropriate front ===
Putting on an appropriate front (e.g. choice of clothes, language, facial expressions, excellent customer service) provides messages to support the role (Harris & Nelson 2008, p 245). Some individuals seem more adept at saying and doing the right thing at the right time, thereby avoiding malapropisms with some regularity. Individuals and group role abilities often determine the acceptability of the act (Pacanowsky & O’Donnell-Trujillo, 1983).

=== Dramatic realization ===
Using verbal and nonverbal symbols to fulfill the requirements of the role leads to dramatic realization (Harris & Nelson 2008, p. 246). Image presentation and impression management are popular concepts for these efforts (Lord & Maher, 1991). Although there may be legitimate concerns regarding unethical impression management, it is a useful tool “to secure leadership positions and to achieve goals” (Hackman & Johnson, 2000, p. 24).

=== Mystification ===
A certain amount of mystification is required to put distance between the actor and the audience (Harris & Nelson 2008, p. 247).

== Types of rituals ==
Rituals are acted out by performances and encompass all repeated activities (Harris & Nelson 2008, p. 248). Rituals provide for organizational reality.

=== Rituals of arrival ===
The rituals of arrival include those processes that explain what we must learn in order to be a bonafide member of the organization (Harris & Nelson 2008, p. 248). Socialization is the process of indoctrinating Indoctrination new employees to a company's policies. New members find that “taken-for-granted ways no longer fit; the familiar customs and practices of the previous job or role are inappropriate” (Gabriel et al., 2000, p. 16). Many organizations have adopted a clear acculturation process to guarantee successful socialization (Harris, 1990).

=== Rituals of belonging and exclusion ===
Once an individual is part of an organization, there are rituals of belonging and exclusion (Harris & Nelson 2008, p. 248). Belonging rituals are indications that one is being accepted within the organization and or workgroup (Harris & Nelson 2008, p. 248).

=== Organizational rites ===
Organization rites are planned activities that have both practical and expressive consequences (Harris & Nelson 2008, p. 250). When this definition is applied to corporate life, such diverse activities as personnel testing, organizational development programs, and collective bargaining can be seen as rites that have not only practical consequences but also express important cultural meanings (Trice & Beyer, 1985, pp. 372–373).

== Related theories ==
As mentioned above, the symbolic behavior perspective has strong roots in the symbolic interactionism (SI) perspective. SI described as a movement is devoted to exploring ways people come together, or come to share meaning. Philosopher Susanne Langer created a symbol theory which posits symbolism to be the central concern of philosophy because it underlies all human knowing and understanding (Littlejohn & Foss, p. 105). Langer believes that while all animal life is dominated by feeling, human feeling is mediated by conceptions, symbols and language. Animals respond to signs, but humans' stimulus from a sign is significantly more complex. The perspective is also associated with symbolic communication where animal societies are studied to help understand how symbolic communication affects the conduct of members of a cooperating group. Symbolic behavior is also linked to the work of American anthropologist Leslie Alvin White (1940) who stated that "all human behavior originates in the use of symbols." He believed human behavior and symbolic behavior to be synonymous with one another. Symbolic behavior perspective is also closely related to organizational communication and interpersonal relationships which involve interaction between two or more people and how they work together to achieve goals.
