= Bloomer =

Bloomer may refer to:

- Bloomer, a type of loaf of bread – a crusty loaf with rounded ends, and typically with several parallel diagonal slashes across its top
- Bloomers (clothing), a type of clothing for women
- LNWR Bloomer Class, an early British railway locomotive
- Bloomer potato, a potato variety

== People ==
- Bloomer (surname)
- Bloomer Bloomfield, nickname for American astronaut Michael J. Bloomfield

== Places in the United States ==
- Bloomer, Ohio, unincorporated community
- Bloomer, Wisconsin, city
- Bloomer (town), Wisconsin
- Bloomer Township, Michigan
- Bloomer Township, Marshall County, Minnesota

== Other uses ==
- Bloomer Girl, a 1944 Broadway musical
- Bloomer Shippers Connecting Railroad, serving east-central Illinois
- Early bloomer, early physical maturation

== See also ==
- Bloomers (disambiguation)
