= Jimmy Bloomer =

Jimmy Bloomer may refer to:

- Jimmy Bloomer (footballer, born 1926) (1926–2011), Scottish football inside forward
- Jimmy Bloomer (footballer, born 1947), Scottish football defender
