= William Learned Marcy Pendleton =

William Learned Marcy Pendleton (February 19, 1865 – 1947) was a French-born painter, classified as a member of the American School.

== Life ==
Pendleton was born in Paris on February 19, 1865, to American parents. Pendleton was a student of Carolus-Durand, who also taught John Singer Sargent. Pendleton became a member of la Société des Artistes Indépendants. He was awarded an honorable mention at the Salon de Paris exhibition in 1888, at the age of 23.

His grandfather was US Secretary of State William L. Marcy.

== Death ==
William died on 18th of January 1947 in Brooklyn, New York and was buried at Albany rural cemetery.
