= Atlantic Foundry Company =

The Atlantic Foundry Company was an Akron, Ohio-based iron casting manufacturer that operated from 1905 to 1989. The company was founded by Charles Reymann Sr., an immigrant from Alsace-Lorraine, along with 4 fellow foundrymen, Ewald Erickson, Emil Krill, Fred Spalding, and Phillip Willenbacker, who had crossed the Atlantic Ocean when they migrated to America and named their new business The Atlantic Foundry. To meet the growing demand for iron, in 1910 they built a modern iron foundry at 182 Beaver Street and in 1919 they added a huge steel foundry at the same site and began a steel casting business. By this time Erickson and Krill had sold their interest to Reymann and he eventually became the President of the company, and the company was privately owned and operated by the Reymann family until its closing.

At its peak, the company employed 450 people, including its

It operated its own credit union.  The company also created a division called Akron Mattress Co., which was later sold in the late 1960s to a private concern that became Schubert Industries Inc.

Atlantic Foundry closed on January 13, 1989. Thomas Reymann, the company's final president, said the manufacturing plant had not been profitable during its final six years. The Ohio Employee Ownership Center (OEOC), a non-profit program affiliated with Kent State University, attempted to work with the foundry's employees to purchase the company from the Reymann family under the terms of an employee stock ownership plan (ESOP). However, a lawsuit brought by 125 foundry retirees seeking the resumption of health and life insurance benefits derailed the ESOP negotiations.
