= Lucy Lee-Robbins =

Expatriate American painter living in Paris

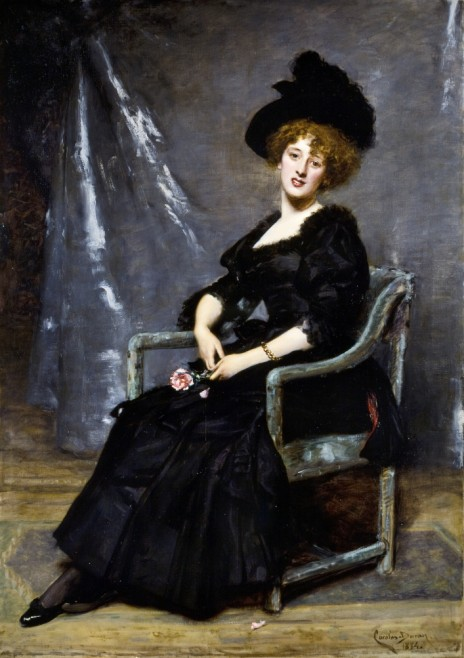
- Portrait of Lucy Lee-Robbins by Carolus-Duran, 1884
- Born: 24 June 1865; New York
- Died: 28 July 1943 (aged 78); Paris, France
- Known for: Painting
- Spouse: Hendrik-George van Rinkhuyzen (m. 1895–1922)

Lucy Lee-Robbins (1865–1943) was an expatriate American painter living in France. She is known for her portraits of female nudes, an unusual subject for women painters in the late 19th century. She was the first female associate member of the Société Nationale des Beaux-Arts.

== Biography ==
Lee-Robbins was born to Samuel Howland Robbins and Sophia Morgan Robbins, both of wealthy banking families, on 24 June 1865 in New York. She and her family moved to Paris in the 1880s. In 1884 she joined a women's atelier run by Carolus-Duran and Jean-Jacques Henner. The same year her portrait was painted by Carolus-Duran.

In 1887 Lee-Robbins debuted at the Salon of the Société des Artistes Français. She also exhibited at the National Academy of Design, the Pennsylvania Academy of the Fine Arts, the Art Institute of Chicago, and the Union des femmes peintres et sculpteurs.

Starting in 1889 she exhibited with the Societe Nationale des Beaux-Arts and in 1890 was appointed the first female associate member of the Societe.

Lee-Robbins exhibited her work at the Palace of Fine Arts at the 1893 World's Columbian Exposition in Chicago, Illinois.

In 1895 she married fellow painter Hendrik-George van Rinkhuyzen.

Lee-Robbins died on 28 July 1943 in Paris, France. Because her final years were spent in Nazi-occupied Paris, the disposition of her paintings is not well documented.

== Gallery ==
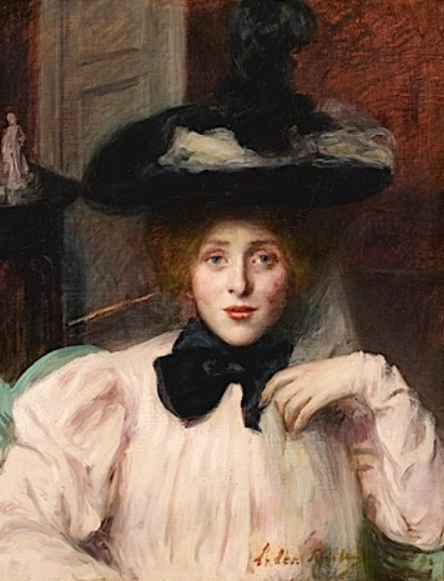
Portrait of woman in black hat, 1890

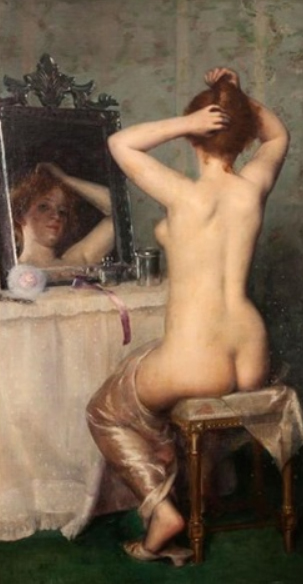
Young woman in front of her mirror, 1891
