= Bloomers (disambiguation) =

Bloomers are undergarments named after Amelia Bloomer.

Bloomers may also refer to:

- Bloomers (TV series), the 1979 BBC sitcom by James Saunders, starring Richard Beckinsale.
- Auntie's Bloomers, a blooper show hosted by Terry Wogan that ran on BBC television from 1991 to 2001.

== See also ==
- Bloomer (disambiguation)
