= George Bloomer =

George Bloomer may refer to:

- George Frost Bloomer (1858–1938), English composer and organist
- George G. Bloomer (born 1963), American evangelist, pastor and entrepreneur
