= John Bloom =

John Bloom may refer to:

- John Bloom (actor) (1944–1999), American actor
- John Bloom (businessman) (1931–2019), English entrepreneur
- John Bloom (film editor) (born 1935), British film editor

== See also ==
- Joe Bob Briggs (John Irving Bloom, born 1953), American film critic, writer and comic performer
