= Carolus-Duran =

French portrait painter (1837–1917)

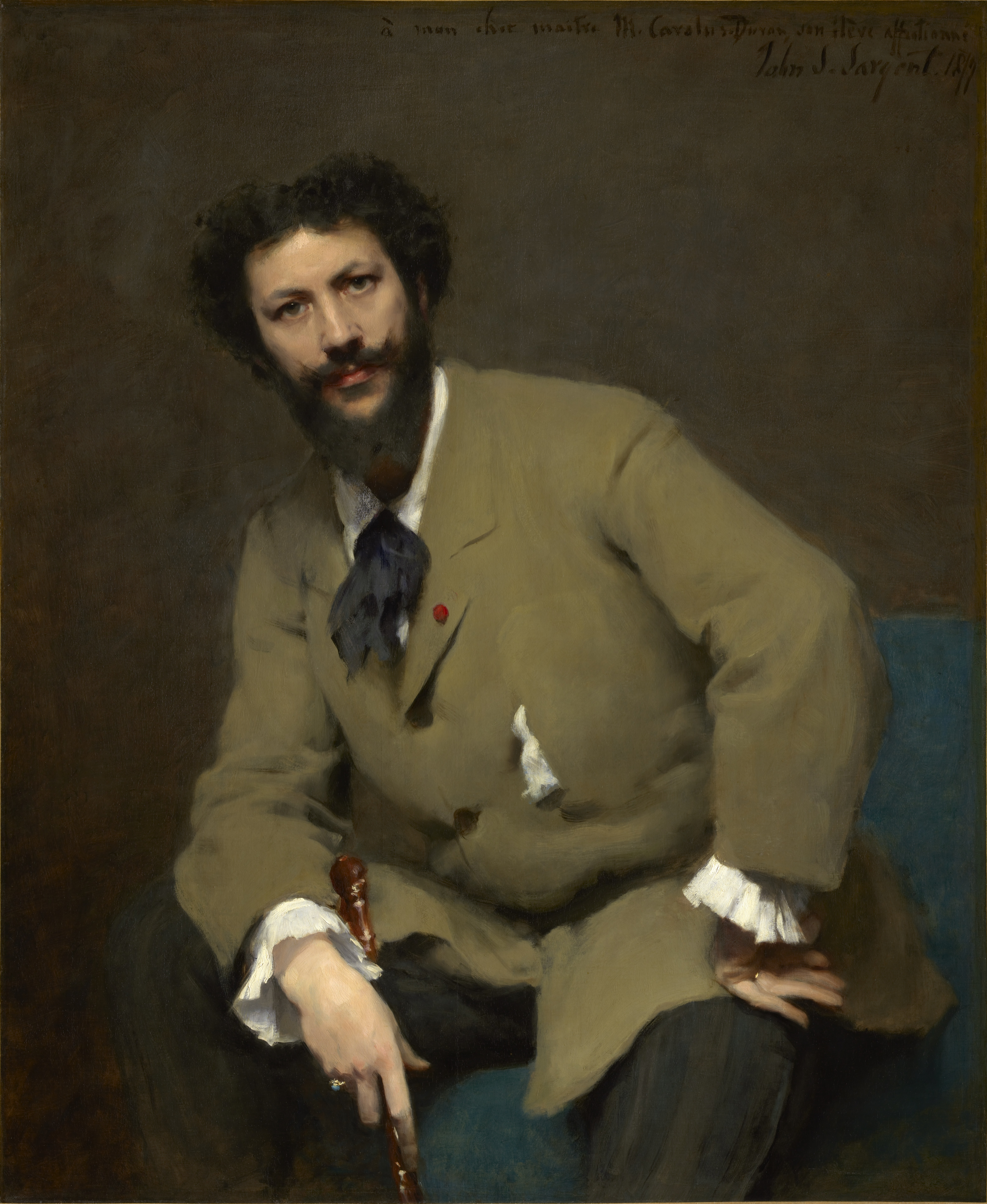
- Portrait of Carolus-Duran by John Singer Sargent, 1879, oils; Clark Art Institute
- Born: Charles Auguste Émile Durand; 4 July 1837; Lille, France
- Died: 17 February 1917 (aged 79); Paris, France
- Education: Académie des Beaux-Arts
- Known for: director of the French Academy in Rome
- Spouse: Pauline Croizette (m. 1869; died 1912)
- Children: 3
- Awards: Grand Officer, Legion of Honour (1900)

Signature
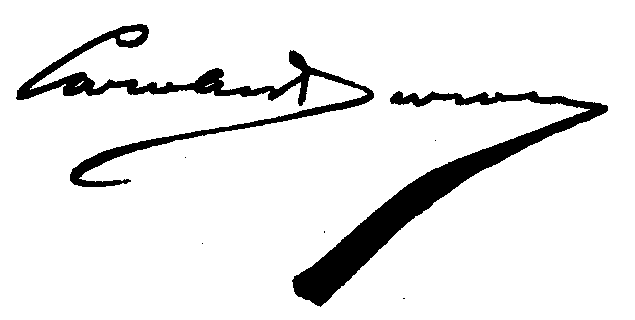

Charles Auguste Émile Durand, known as Carolus-Duran (4 July 1837 – 17 February 1917), was a French painter and art instructor during the Belle Époque. He is noted for his stylish depictions of members of high society in Third Republic France.

== Biography ==
The son of a hotel owner, his first drawing lessons were with a local sculptor named Augustin-Phidias Cadet de Beaupré (1800–?) at the Académie de Lille; then took up painting with François Souchon, a student of Jacques-Louis David. He went to Paris in 1853, where he adopted the name "Carolus-Duran".

In 1859, he had his first exhibition at the Salon. That same year, he began attending the Académie Suisse, where he studied until 1861. One of his early influences was the Realism of Gustave Courbet.

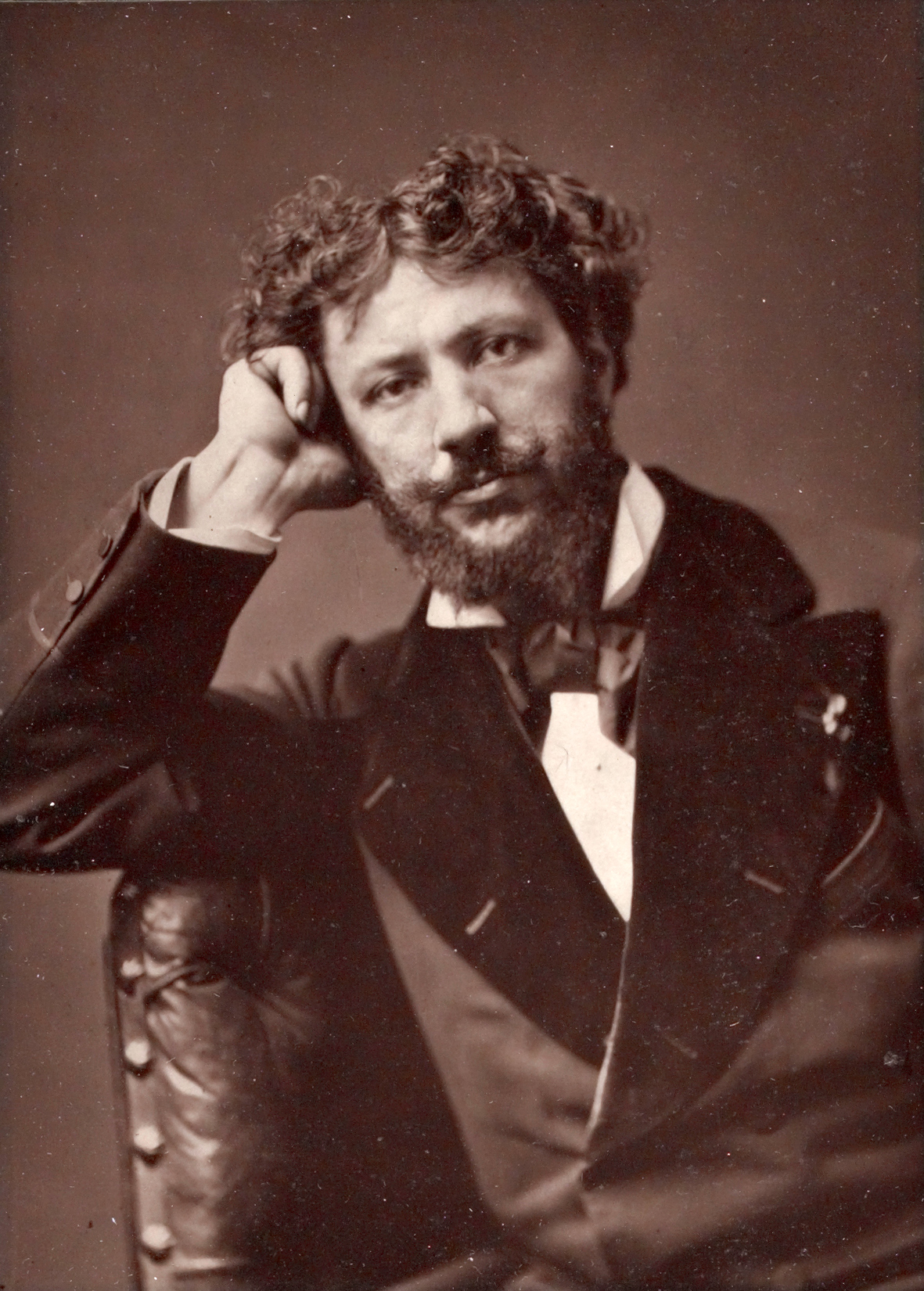
Carolus-Duran (c. 1880)

From 1862 to 1866, he travelled to Rome and Spain, thanks to a scholarship granted by his hometown. During that time, he moved away from Courbet's style and became more interested in Diego Velázquez.

Upon returning to France, he was awarded his first gold medal at the Salon. His picture "Murdered", or "The Assassination" (1866), was one of his first successes, but he became best known afterwards as a portrait-painter, and as the head of one of the principal ateliers in Paris, where some of the most brilliant artists of a later generation were his pupils.

In 1867, he became one of the nine members of the "Société Japonaise du Jinglar" (a type of wine); a group that included Henri Fantin-Latour, Félix Bracquemond and Marc-Louis Solon. They would meet once a month in Sèvres for a dinner "à la Japonaise".

He married Pauline Croizette, a pastellist and miniaturist who had posed for his painting The Lady with the Glove in 1869. They had three children. Their eldest daughter, Marie-Anne, married the playwright Georges Feydeau.

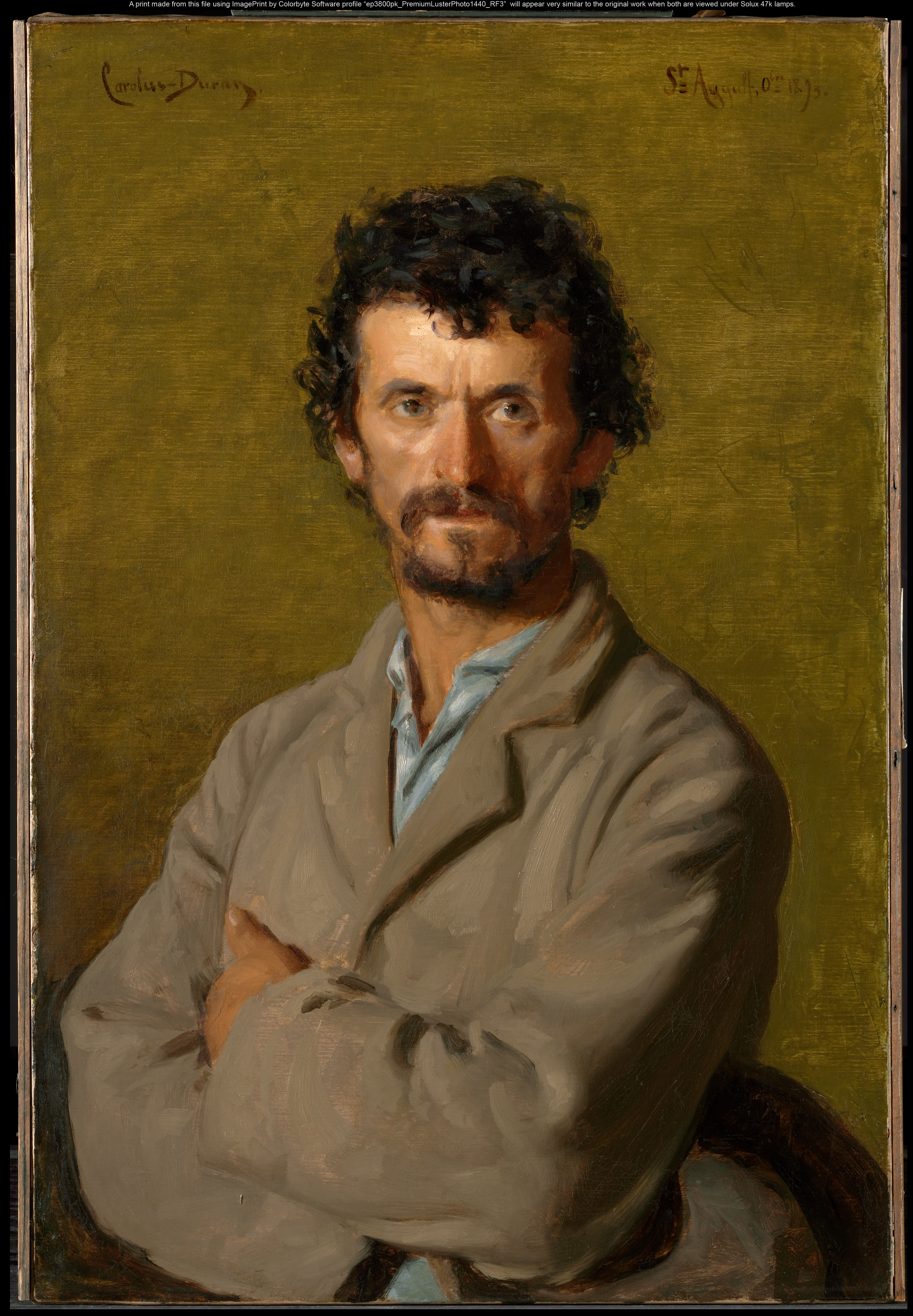
Carolus-Duran, The Artist's Gardener, 1893, Clark Art Institute

After 1870, he devoted himself almost entirely to portraits. While many of his paintings depicted wealthy patrons in elegant clothing, he also notably painted a portrait of his gardener which stands in contrast to his other works in its loose strokes and earth tones. His success allowed him to open a studio on the Boulevard du Montparnasse, where he also gave painting lessons. He was named a Knight in the Légion d'honneur in 1872; being promoted to Officer in 1878, Commander in 1889 and Grand Officer in 1900.

In 1889 and 1900 he served on the juries at the Expositions Universelles. In 1890, he was one of the co-founders of the second Société Nationale des Beaux-Arts and he was elected a member of the Académie des Beaux-Arts in 1904. The following year, he was appointed Director of the French Academy in Rome, a position he held until 1913.

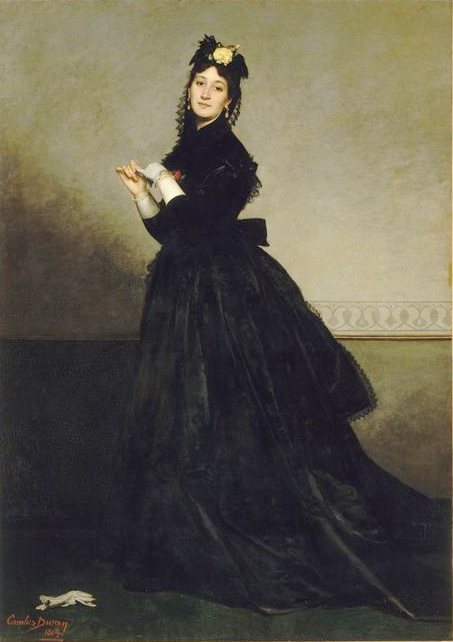
The Lady with the Glove, 1869, modelled by his wife Pauline

He was a frequent visitor to the resort at Fréjus, where he owned a small villa. Following his death at age 79, the resort named a plaza and a beach after him.

== Pupils ==
His pupils reportedly included John Singer Sargent, Hiram Reynolds Bloomer, Irving Ramsey Wiles, Ralph Wormeley Curtis, Francis Brooks Chadwick, Emma Chadwick Jan Stanisławski (painter), Kenyon Cox Theodore Robinson, Mariquita Jenny Moberly. Mariette Leslie Cotton, Maximilien Luce, James Carroll Beckwith, Will Hicok Low, Mary Fairchild MacMonnies Low, Alexandre Jean-Baptiste Brun, Robert Alan Mowbray Stevenson, Lucy Lee-Robbins, Ramón Casas i Carbó, Ernest Ange Duez and James Cadenhead

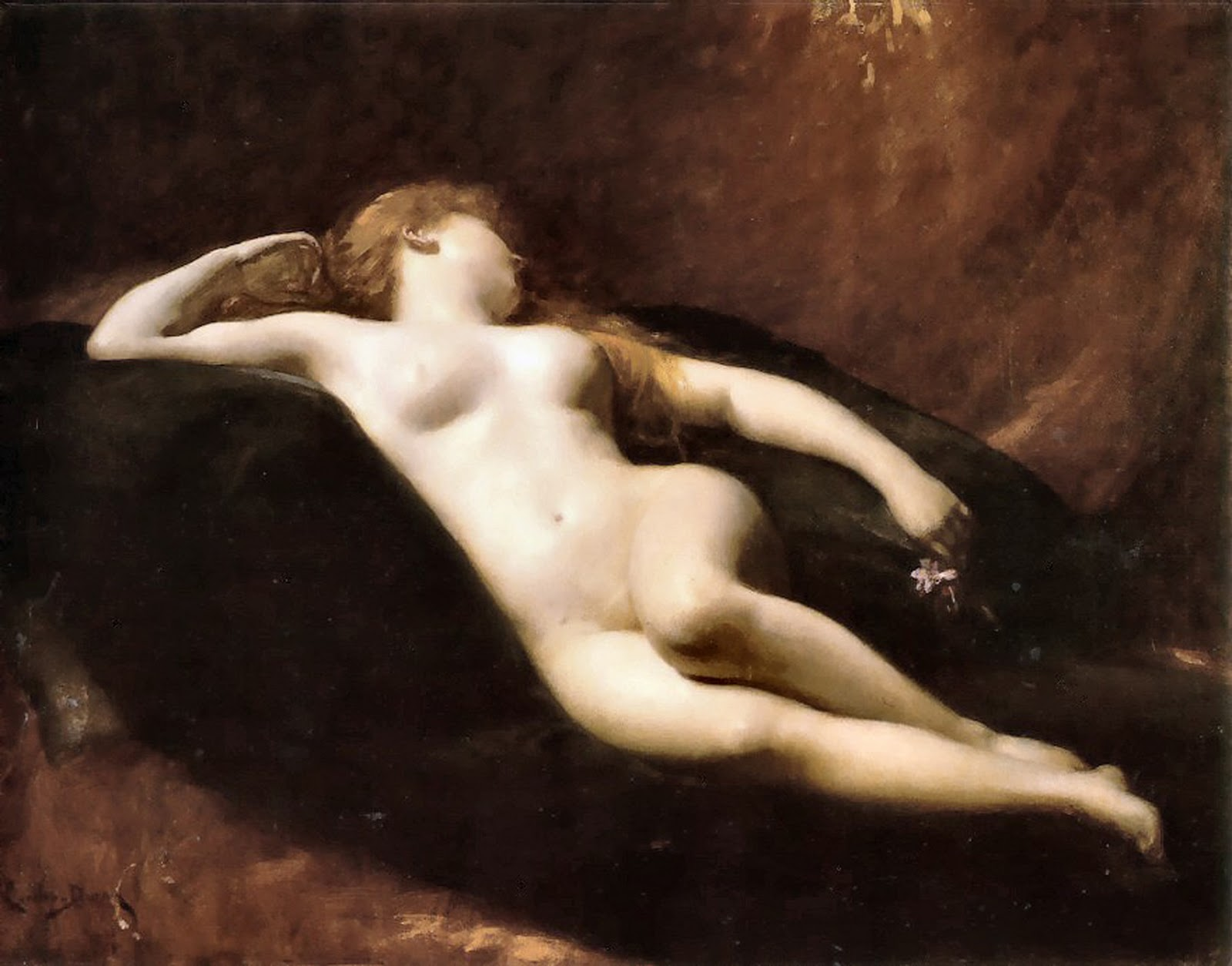
Danae

== Selected works ==
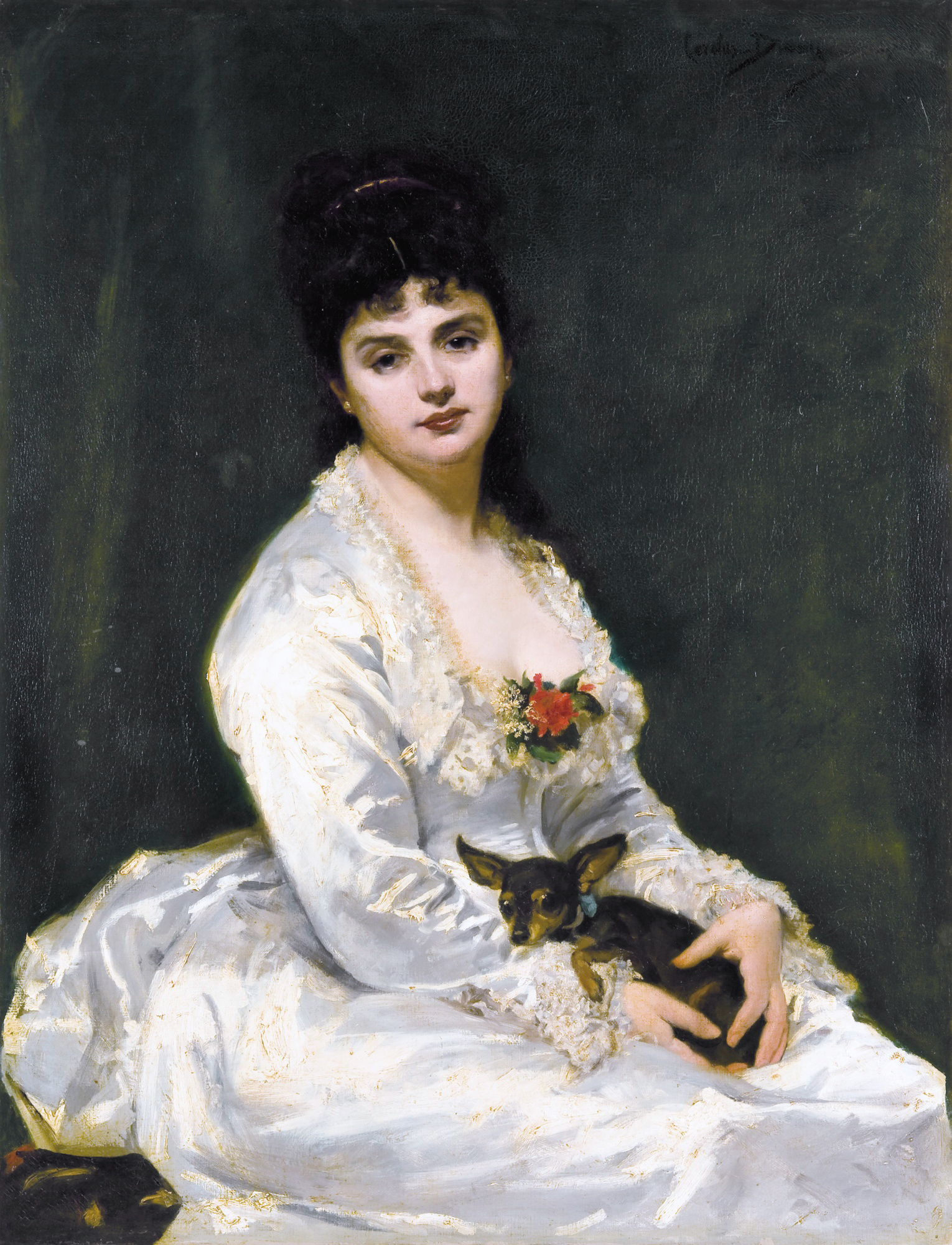
Madame Henry Fouquier
(1876)

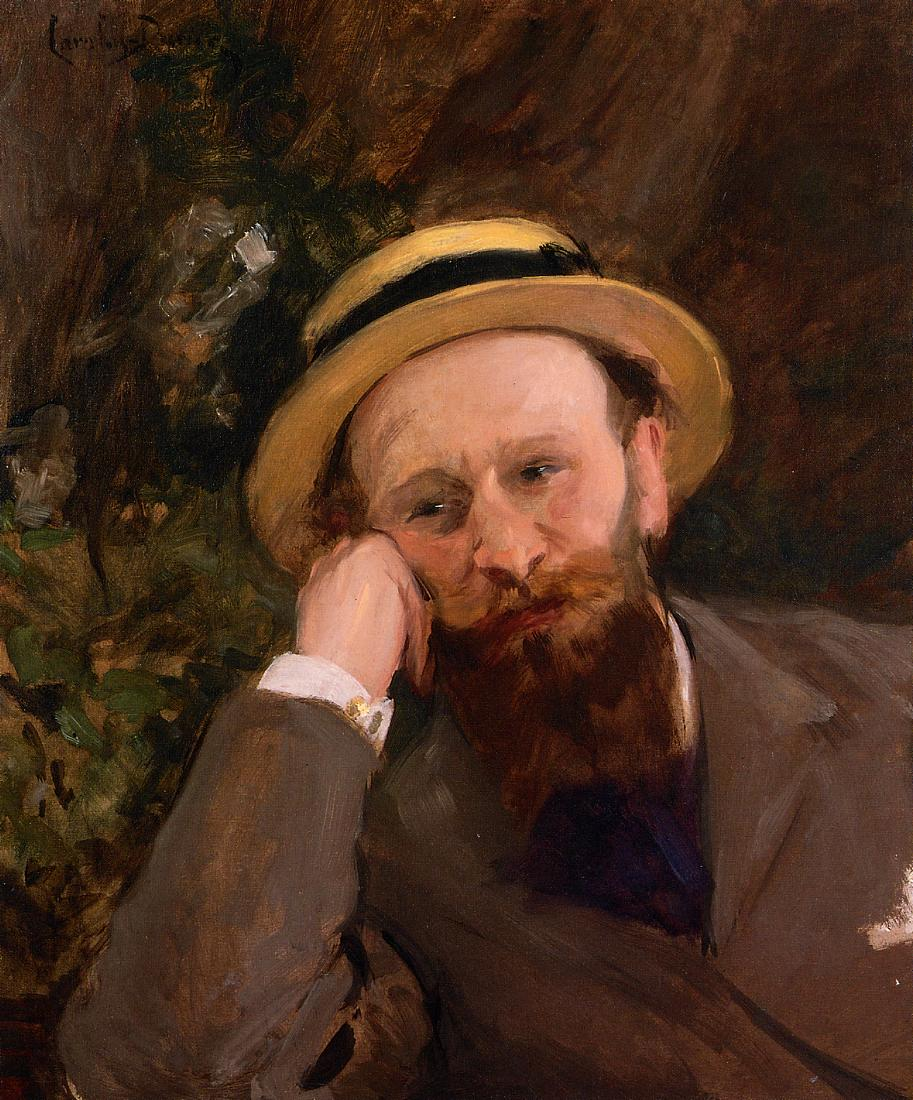
Édouard Manet (1880)

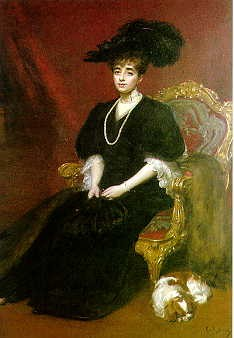
Anna Gould

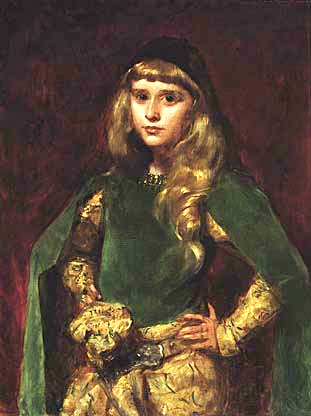
Natalie Clifford Barney
at age ten (ca. 1886–1887)

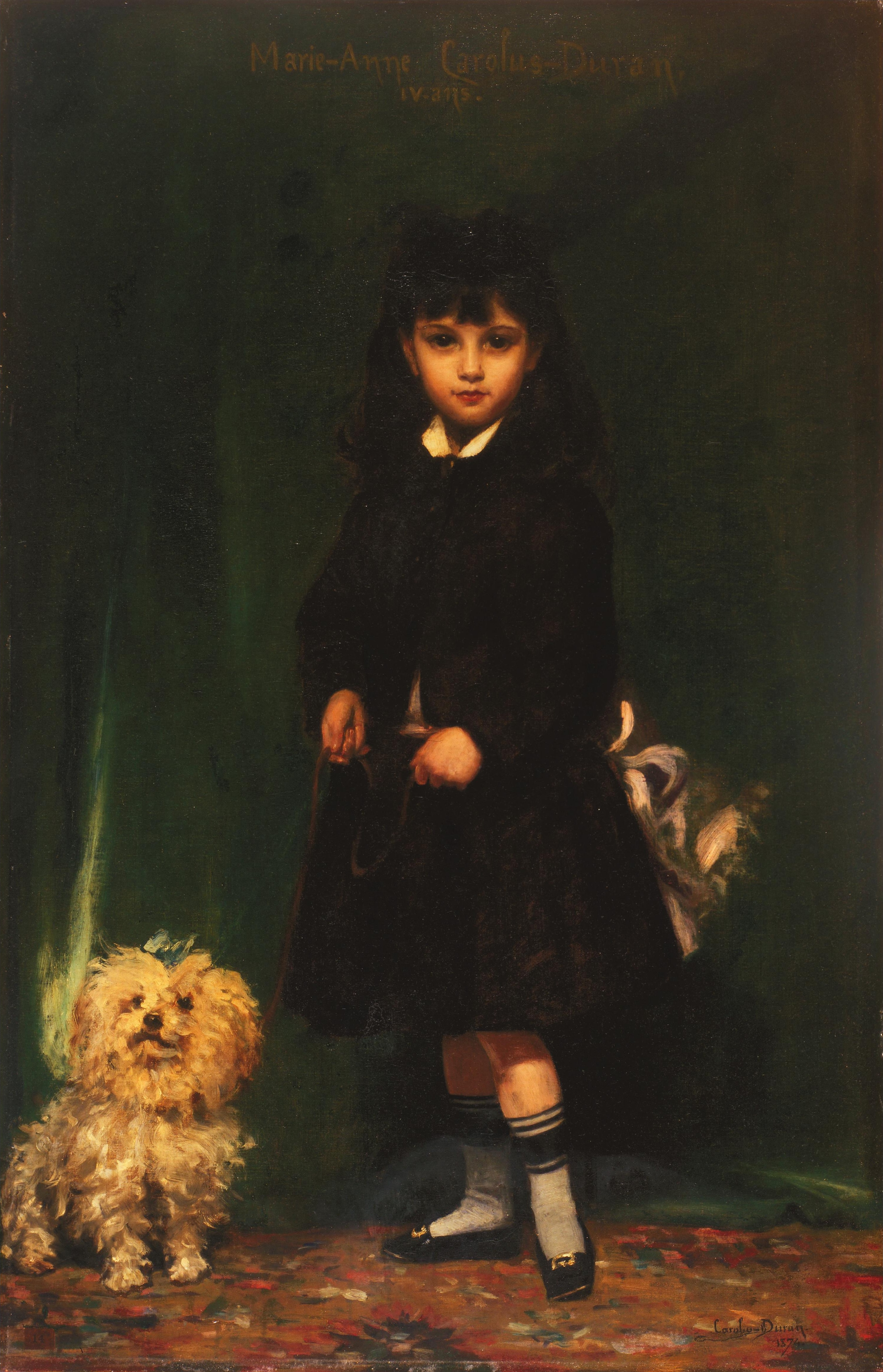
The Artist's Daughter,
Marie-Anne (1874)

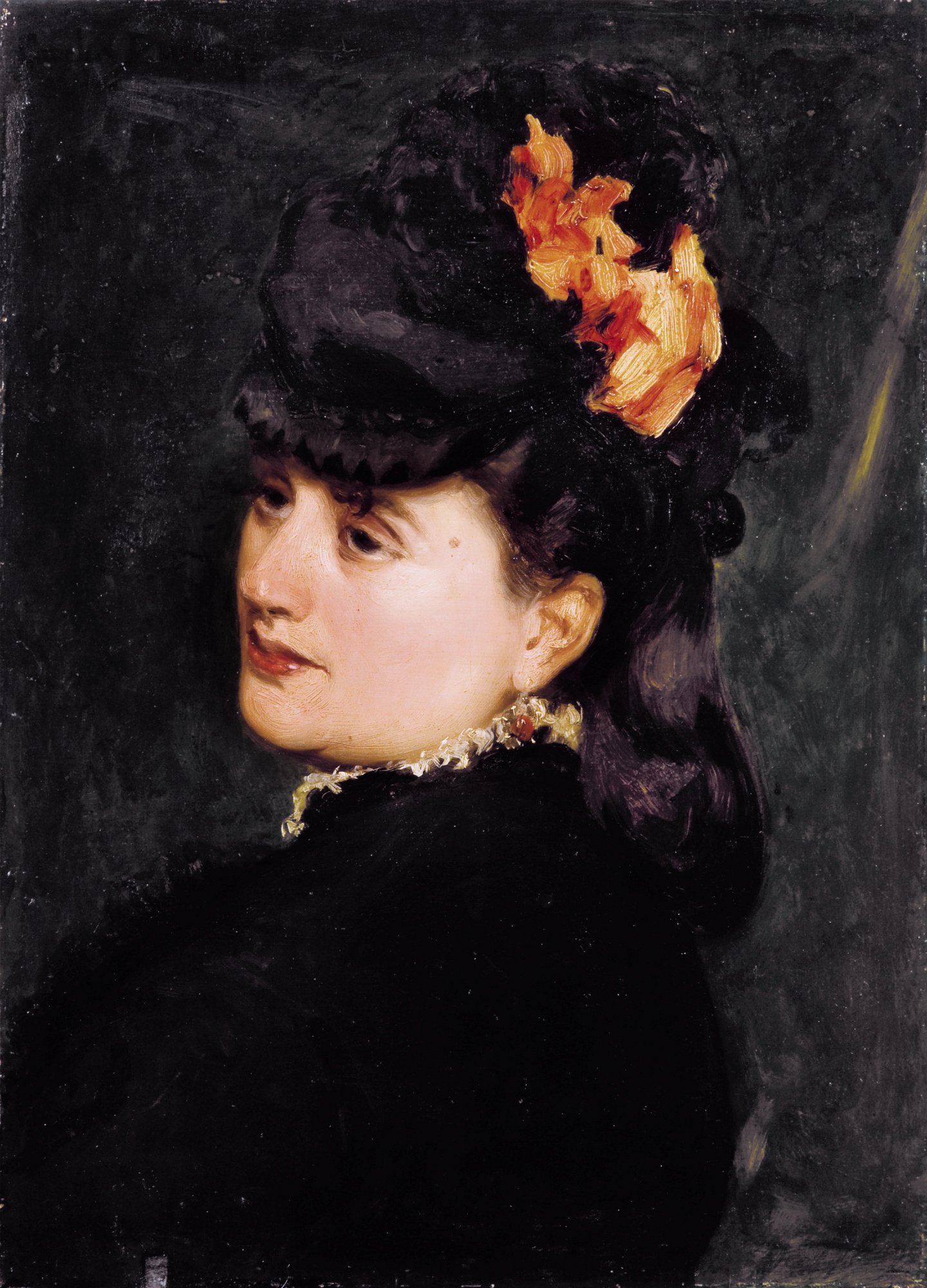
Marie-Anne as Madame Feydeau (1897)

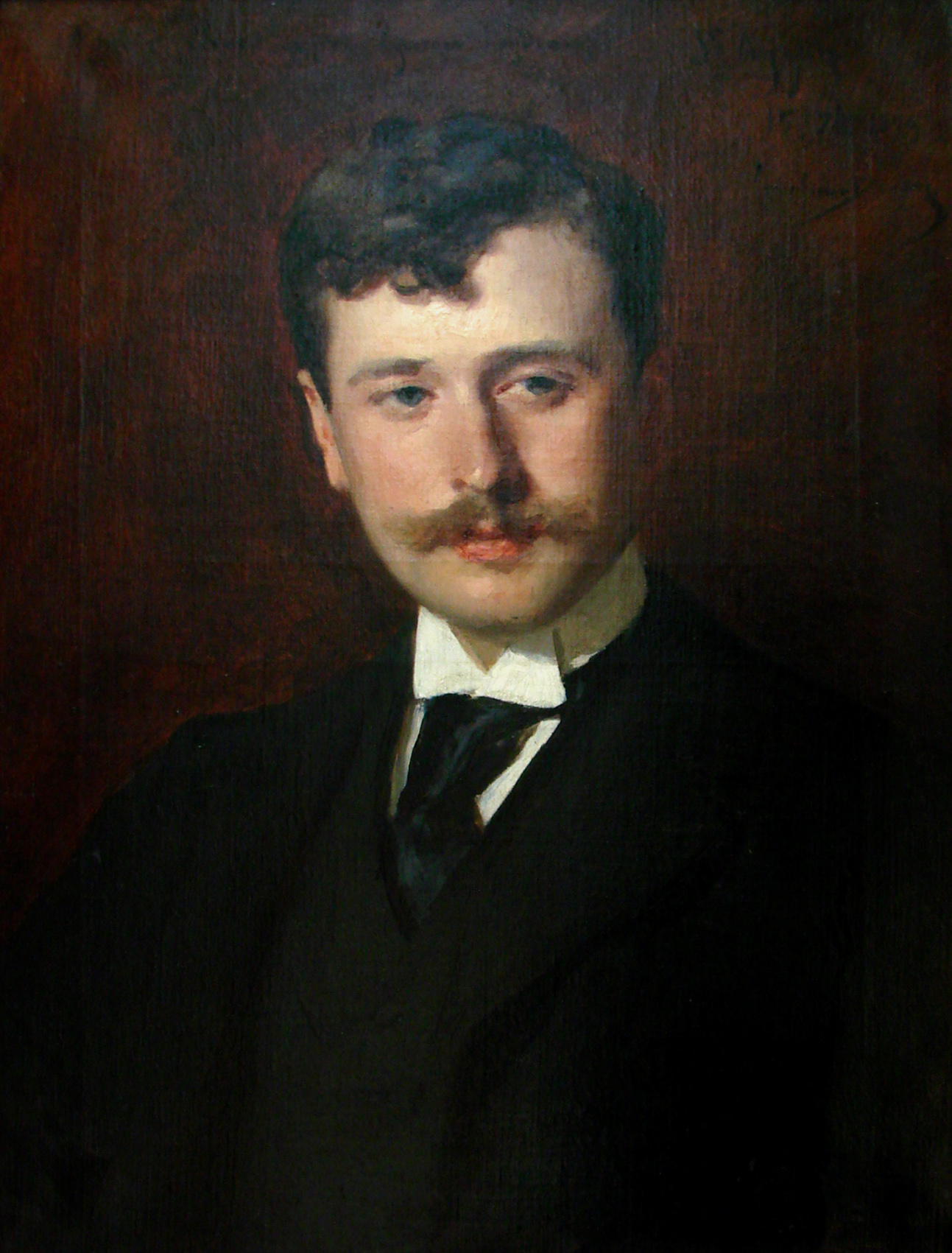
Georges Feydeau
(ca. 1900)

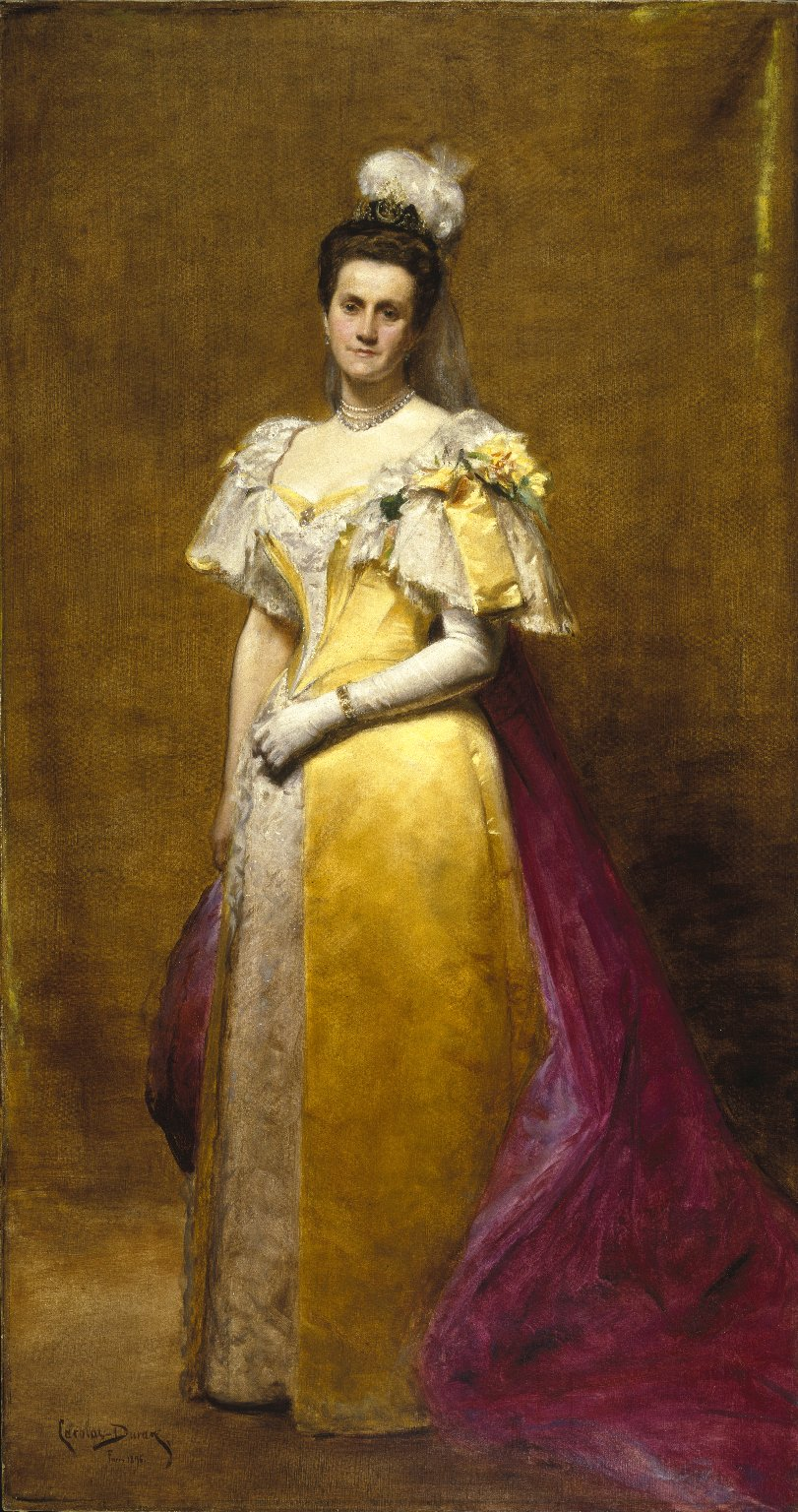
Portrait of Emily Warren Roebling (ca. 1896), Brooklyn Museum

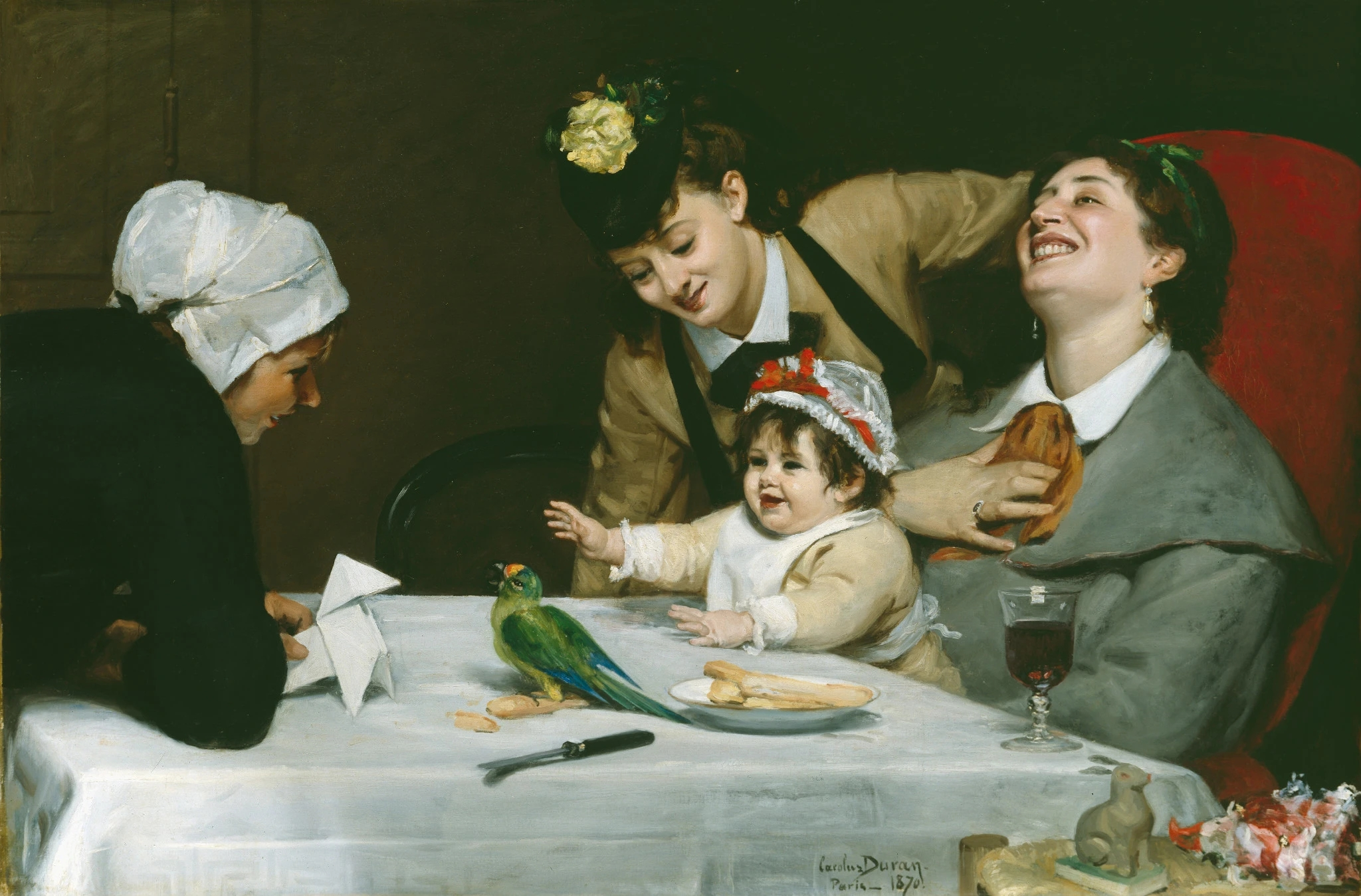
Merrymakers
(1870)

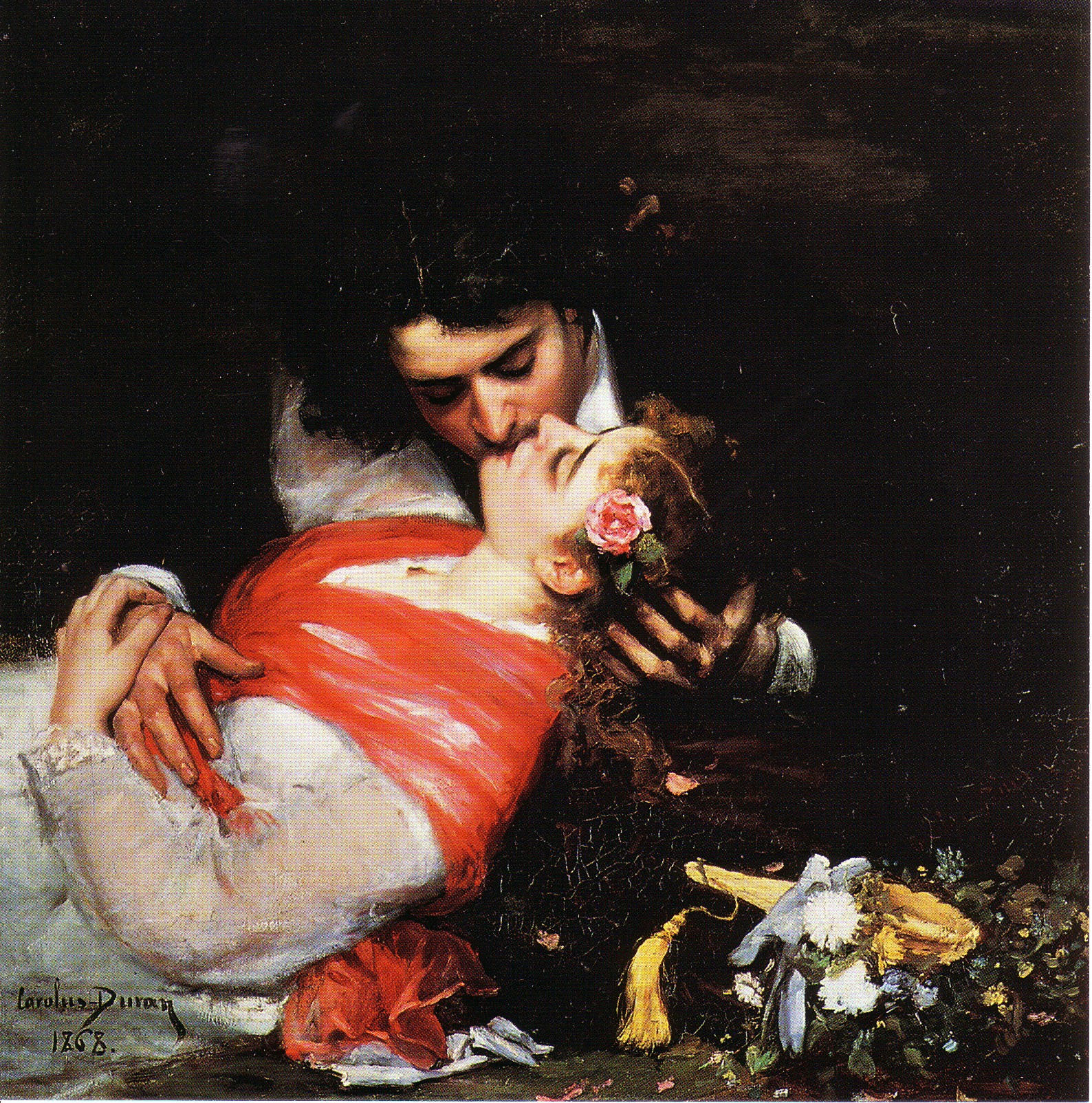
Le Baiser (The Kiss)
(1868), self-portrait with his wife as newlyweds

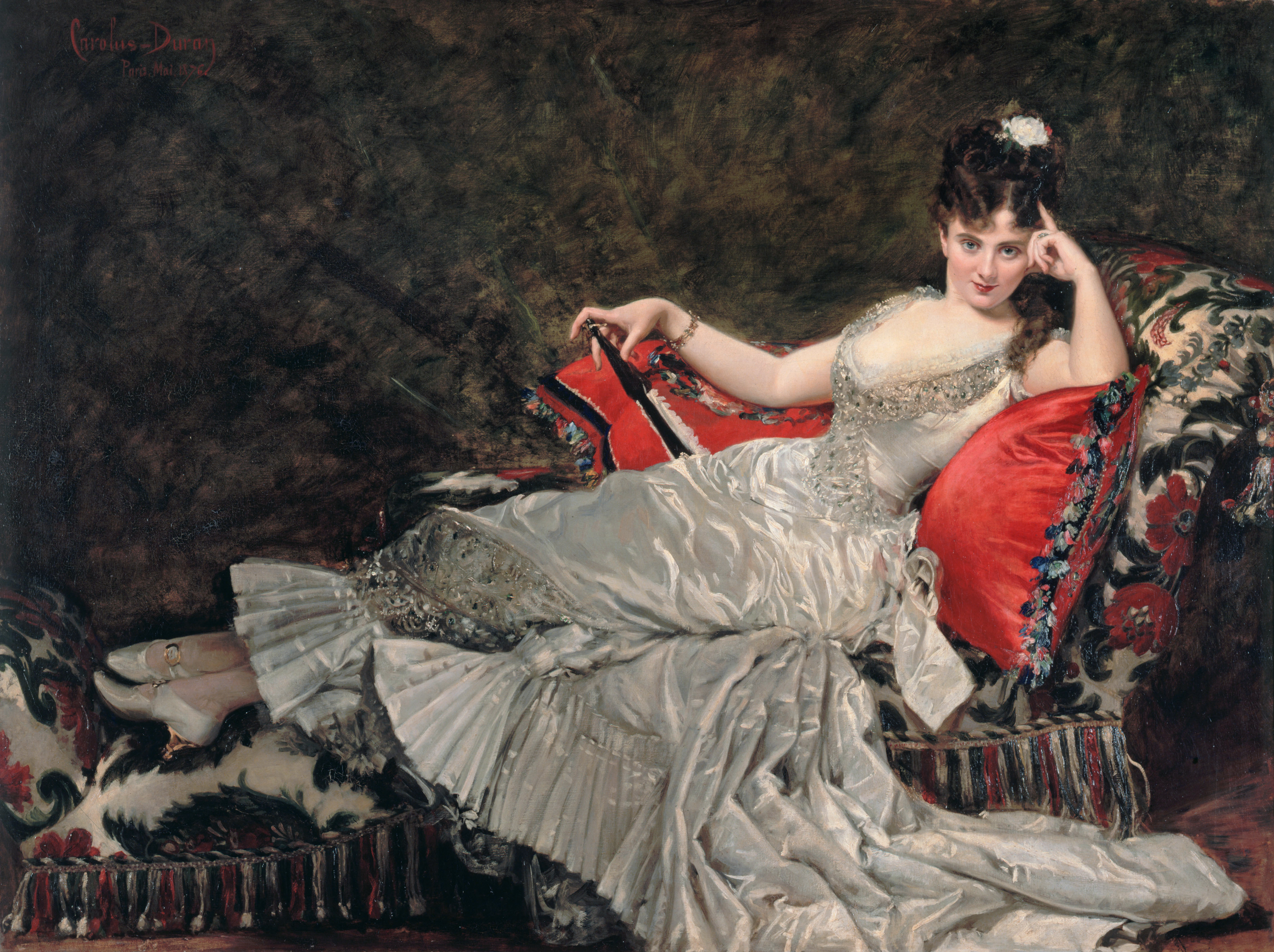
Mademoiselle de Lancey

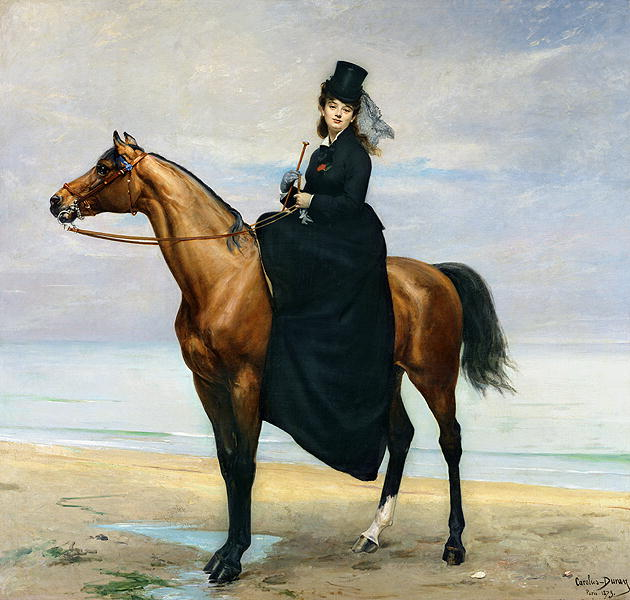
Equestrian Portrait of Mademoiselle Croizette (1873)

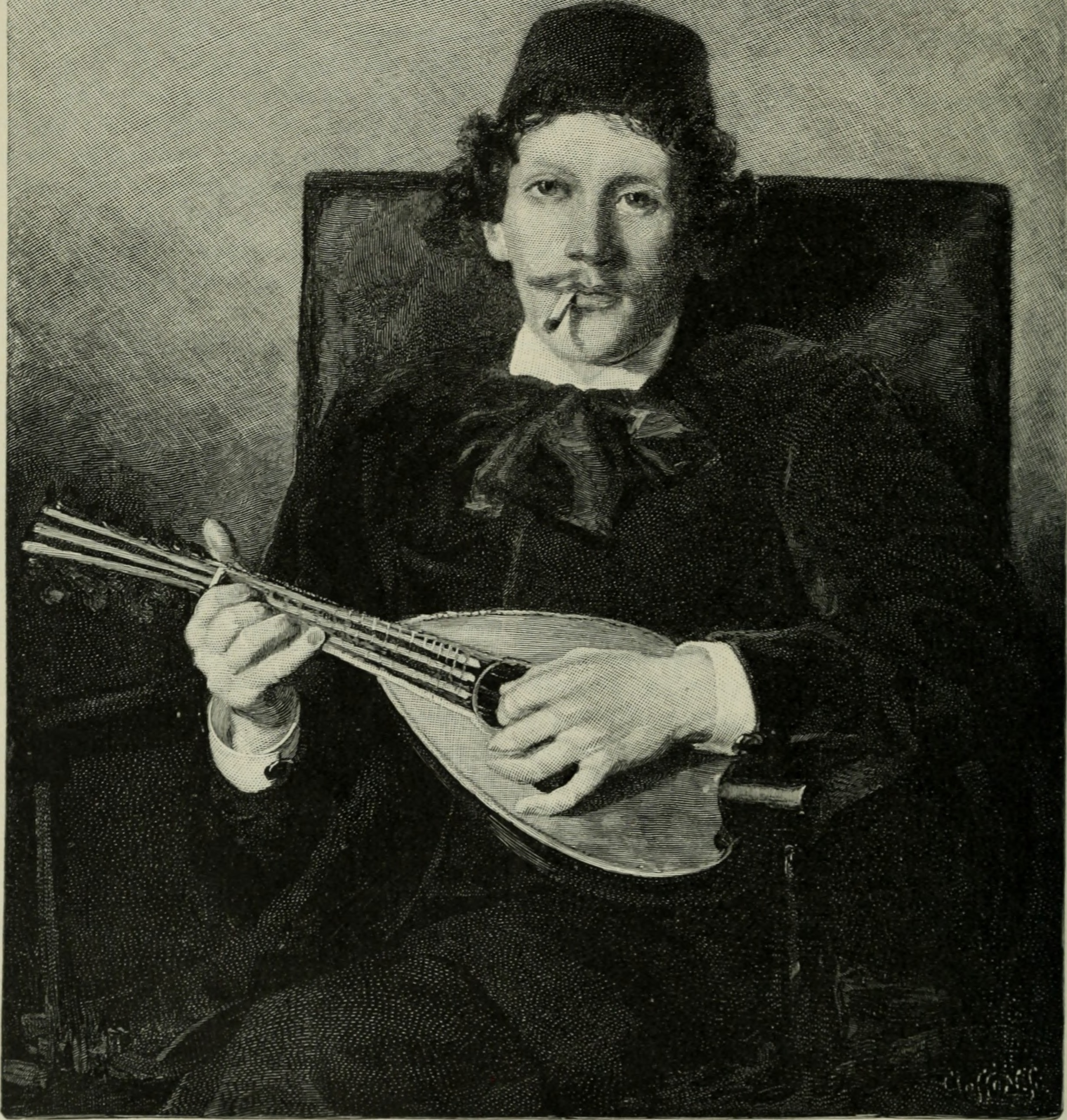
The Poet with the Mandolin (1887)

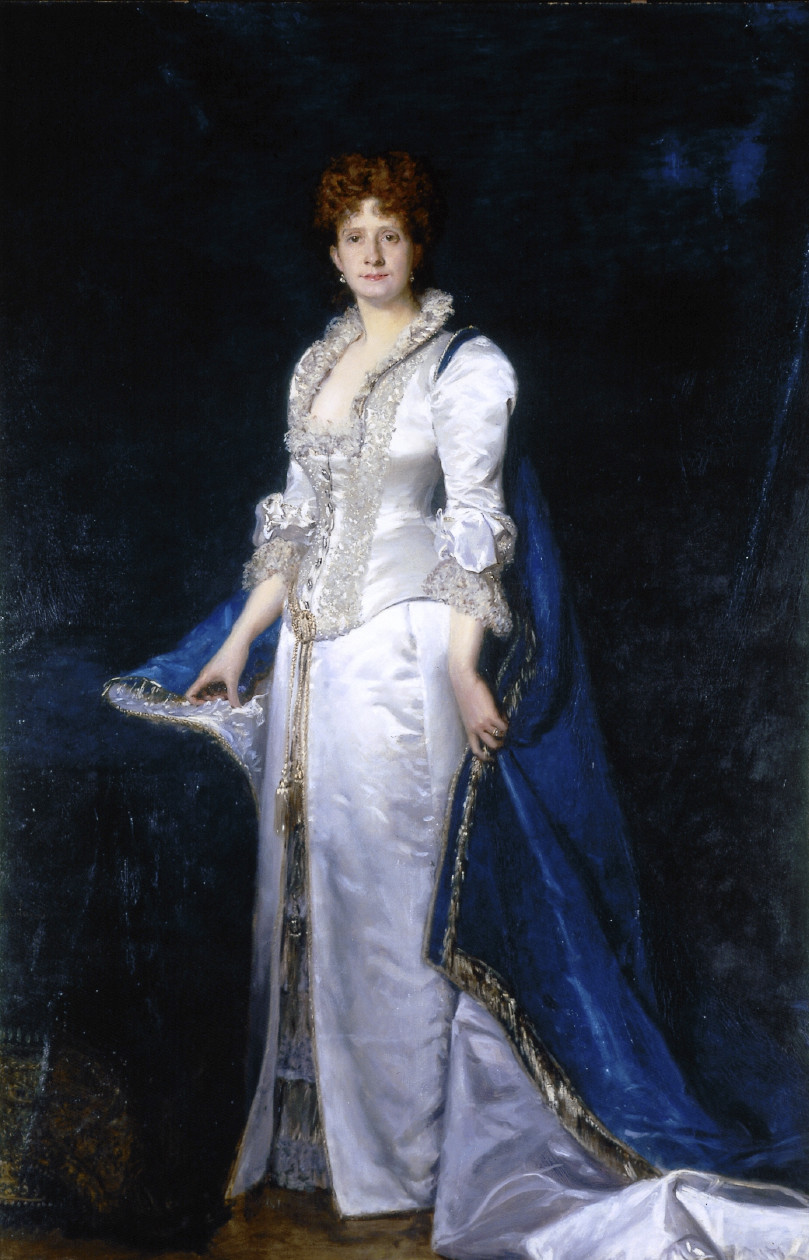
Maria Pia of Savoy, Queen of Portugal (1883)

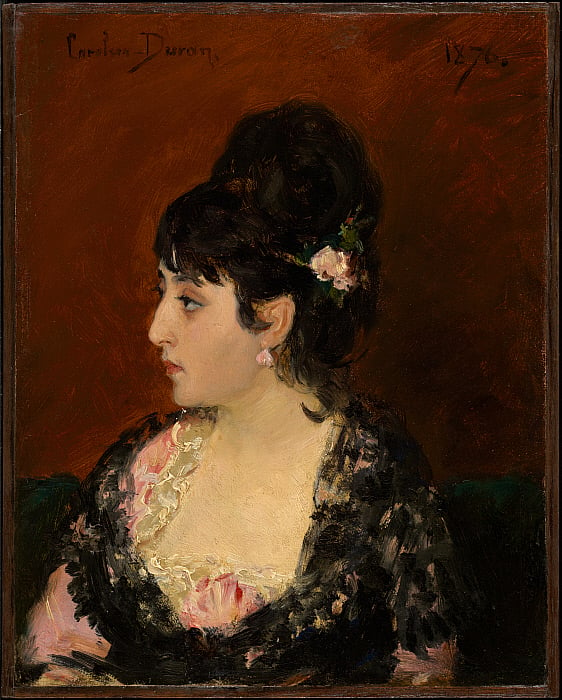
Spanish Woman, a supposed portrayal of Eva Gonzalès (1876), oil on panel, Clark Art Institute
