= The Lady with the Glove =

Painting by Carolus-Duran

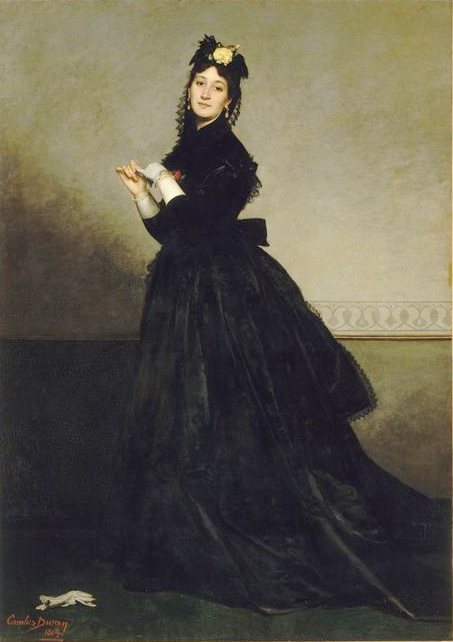
- Artist: Carolus-Duran
- Year: 1869
- Type: Oil on canvas, portrait painting
- Dimensions: 228 cm × 164 cm (90 in × 65 in)
- Location: Musée d'Orsay, Paris

The Lady with the Glove (French: La dame au gant) is a 1869 oil painting by the French artist Carolus-Duran. A portrait painting, it depicts the Artist's wife Pauline Croizette who he had married the same year. She is shown with one discarded glove on the floor.

Duran was an Academic painter whose stylish portaits were strongly associated with the Belle Époque era. He was a major influence on the Anglo-American painter John Singer Sargent who was his pupil. The picture's composition makes reference to the portaits of the seventeenth century Old Master Diego Velázquez. The painting was exhibited at the Salon of 1869 in Paris, where it attracted great interest. Today it is part of the collection of the city's Musée d'Orsay, having been acquired by the French state in 1875.

== Bibliography ==
- Adelson, Warren. Sargent's Venice. Yale University Press, 2006.
- Fisher, Paul. The Grand Affair: John Singer Sargent in His World. Picador, 2023.
