= Blumer =

Blumer is a surname of German origin, from the word blume, meaning "flower". Notable people with the surname include:

- Bob Blumer (born 1962), Canadian cookbook writer and television host
- David Blumer (born 1986), Swiss football player
- Deborah Blumer (1941–2006), American politician
- Elano Blumer (born 1981), Brazilian football player
- George Alder Blumer (1857–1940), American psychiatrist
- Herbert Blumer (1900–1987), American sociologist
- Jairo Luis Blumer (born 1986), Brazilian football player
- Johann Heinrich Blumer (1753–1844), Swiss textile manufacturer
- Johann Jakob Blumer (died 1825) (1756–1825), Swiss merchant
- Johann Jakob Blumer (politician) (1819–1875), Swiss judge
- Liselotte Blumer (born 1957), Swiss badminton player
- Othmar Blumer (1848–1900), Swiss politician
- Randy Blumer (born 1958), Canadian businessman
- Scrappy Blumer (1917–1997), American fighter pilot
- Theodor Blumer (1881–1964), German composer

== See also ==
- Bloomer (surname)
