= William Elijah Bloom =

American politician (1860–1938)

Member of the Minnesota House of Representatives from the 11th district
- In office January 6, 1931 – January 7, 1935

Personal details
- Born: October 19, 1860 Green County, Wisconsin, U.S.
- Died: November 27, 1938 (aged 78) Nobles County, Minnesota, U.S.
- Spouse: Estella Parshall (m. 1881)
- Children: 5
- Occupation: Politician

William Elijah Bloom (October 19, 1860 – November 27, 1938) was an American politician who served in the Minnesota House of Representatives from 1931 to 1935, representing the 11th legislative district of Minnesota in the 47th and 48th Minnesota Legislatures.

== Early life and education ==
Bloom was born on a farm in Green County, Wisconsin, on October 18, 1860. In March 1873, Bloom and his parents moved to Nobles County, Minnesota, where he attended common schools.

== Career ==
Bloom served in the Minnesota House of Representatives from 1931 to 1935, representing the 11th legislative district of Minnesota in the 47th and 48th Minnesota Legislatures.

During his time in office, Bloom served on the following committees:

- Aircraft and Airways (1931–1934)
- Crime Prevention (1931–1934)
- Elections (1931–1934)
- Markets and Marketing (1931–1932)
- Public Buildings (1931–1932)
- University and State Schools (1931–1932)
- Civil Administration (1933–1934)
- Labor (1933–1934)
- Municipal Affairs (1933–1934)
- State Prison (1933–1934)

Bloom chaired the Crime Prevention committee from 1933 to 1934.

Bloom's tenure began on January 6, 1931, and concluded on January 7, 1935. His district included representation for Nobles County.

== Personal life and death ==
In 1881, Bloom married Estella Parshall, with whom he had five children.

Bloom died at the age of 78 in Nobles County, Minnesota, on November 27, 1938.

Minnesota House of Representatives
Preceded by —	Member of the Minnesota House of Representatives from the 11th district 1931–1935	Succeeded by —
