= David P. Bloom =

American fraudster (born 1964)

David Peter Bloom
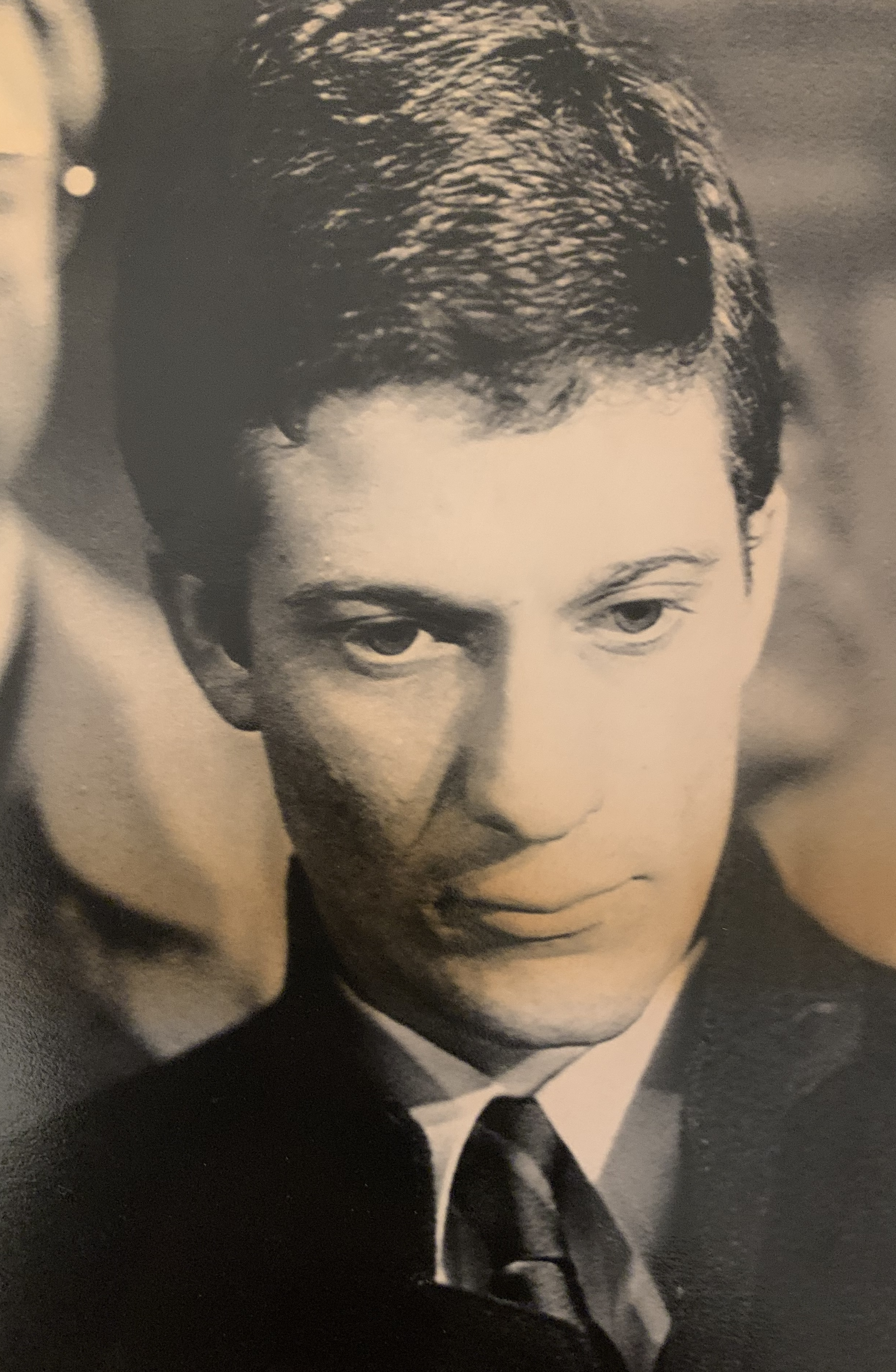
- David P. Bloom outside court in New York, December 1988
- Other name: David Daly
- Status: Held in prison
- Conviction: December 1988, 2000, 2026
- Criminal charges: Mail fraud, securities fraud, grand larceny, grand theft and scheming to defraud
- Penalty: 8 years in prison in 1988, forfeiture of US$13 million, lifetime ban from securities industry, 5 years in prison in 2000, 10 years in prison in 2026

David Peter Bloom is a thrice convicted American fraudster who defrauded investors of almost $15 million in the 1980s.

== Early life ==
David Bloom was born circa 1964. He grew up on the Upper East Side of Manhattan and attended Trinity School where he graduated in 1982. After graduating from Duke University, Bloom returned to New York to start an investment company under the name of Greater Sutton Investors Group Inc.

== Criminal inquiries and conviction in 1988 ==
In 1988, the U.S. Securities and Exchange Commission (SEC) accused Bloom of using his unregistered investment business to collect over $10 million between 1985 and 1988 from over 140 clients for his personal gain. Instead of making investments on behalf of his clients, Bloom was accused of acquiring art, real estate and other personal assets with his clients funds.

Notable investors in Bloom's scheme included the Sultan of Brunei, Bill Cosby, and the Rockefeller family.

Bloom settled with the SEC without admitting guilt and agreed to hand over all his assets to a court-appointed receiver. He also was barred for life from the securities industry, including association with any broker, dealer, investment adviser, investment company, or municipal securities dealer.

Two days after his settlement with the SEC, Bloom was charged by federal prosecutors in Manhattan for violations of the registration and antifraud provisions of the Investment Advisers Act of 1940. Bloom pleaded guilty, waiving indictment, to one count each of mail and securities fraud. He was sentenced to eight years in prison for defrauding investors of almost $15 million. Bloom served 5 years out of his 8-year sentence, at the Federal Correctional Complex, Allenwood, in Pennsylvania.

Due to Bloom's young age at the time of his criminal activity, the press referred to him as a whiz kid; most often the "Wall Street Whiz Kid".

Bloom's parents were later sued for $191,250 that Bloom spent on them, and they settled for $30,000.

== Criminal inquiries and conviction in 2000 ==
In 2000, federal prosecutors in Manhattan accused Bloom of grand larceny and scheming to defraud at least 10 workers at a Manhattan restaurant out of between $50,000 and $200,000. Bloom claimed to own a money management company and offered to invest his victim's money in the stock market and gift I.P.O.'s. However, Bloom spent the funds on himself.

He was arrested in June 2000, did not post the $75,000 bail set and instead was incarcerated in the Vernon C. Bain Correctional Center, part of Rikers Island.

He pleaded guilty to the charges of grand larceny and scheming to defraud and was released in 2006 on parole.

== Criminal inquiries and conviction in 2022, 2023 and 2026 ==
On 9 August 2022, Bloom was arrested on suspicion of 12 counts of grand theft in Los Angeles and he posted $45,000 bail.. One month after his release on bail, in September 2022, he continued his crimes by targeting new victims in the Los Angeles area.

On 28 August 2023, Bloom was arrested again and this time was charged with 18 felony counts: 9 for securities fraud and 9 for grand theft. The district attorney George Gascón called Bloom a predator, and accused him of committing crimes between 2021 and 2023, stealing nearly $250,000 from nine alleged victims. He was being held on $505,000 bail in Los Angeles which was lowered to $100,000 at his arraignment.

In April 2026, the case was set for jury trial and was prosecuted by Deputy District Attorney Paul Przelomiec. On May 5, 2026, Bloom entered an open no contest plea to nine felony counts of securities fraud and nine felony counts of grand theft, along with special allegations that he engaged in a pattern of theft-related felony conduct and had two or more prior felony convictions.. The District Attorney Nathan J. Hochman said Bloom stole from people who trusted him, while he treated their livelihoods as his own personal bankroll.

On June 8, 2026, Bloom was sentenced in Department 117 of the Clara Shortridge Foltz Criminal Justice Center. Los Angeles County Superior Court Judge Kerry Bensinger sentenced Bloom to a 10-year prison term in state prison and ordered him to pay more than $61,000 in restitution to three of the victims who were present in court. Another status conference is scheduled July 30 involving restitution to the remaining victims.
