= George G. Bloomer =

American televangelist (born 1963)

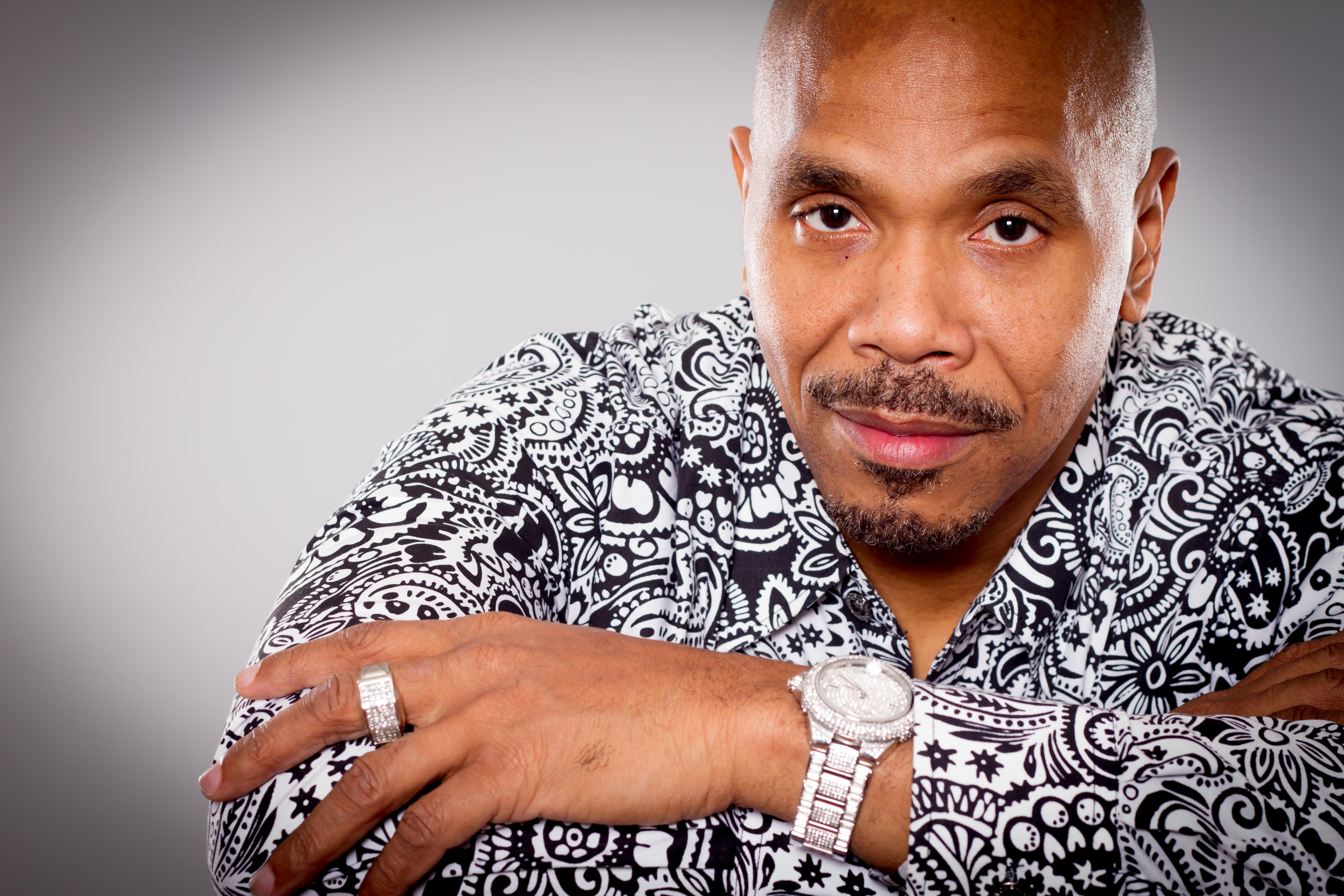
- Born: Brooklyn, New York, U.S.
- Occupation(s): Pastor, Author, Entrepreneur, Television Host, Presiding Bishop
- Title: Bishop
- Website: www.bishopbloomer.com

George G. Bloomer is an evangelist, pastor, author, televangelist, speaker and entrepreneur. He is the pastor and founder of Bethel Family Worship Center, a multi-cultural ministry in Durham, North Carolina. Bloomer is also the founder of G.G. Bloomer Ministries where he travels internationally delivering religious messages. Bloomer also has a show, Spiritual Authority on the TCT Network. He was the host of the television program, Rejoice in the Word, which aired on Friday nights on The Word Network until his departure in September 2019. He now hosts the television show, The Battleground, every Saturday night on TCT Network. As an entrepreneur, he founded Blooming House Publishers and Blooming Records.

== Ministry ==
=== Bethel Family Worship Center ===
George Bloomer founded Bethel Family Worship Center in 1996, after conducting a 30-day old-fashioned Holy Ghost Crusade in Durham, NC on Liberty Street. The first service began on Sunday morning after the tent revival in the T. Q. Business Complex on Corcoran Street, downtown Durham and later moved their services to 515 Dowd Street in Durham, NC.

=== C.L.U.R.T. – Come Let Us Reason Together ===
C.L.U.R.T. International Assemblies is an organization that provides covering for independent churches. The founder, Bishop George G. Bloomer, is the presiding Bishop and Overseer. The purpose of CLURT is to prepare men and women for spiritual service in C.L.U.R.T. Assemblies and in other Christian ministries internationally.

== Published works ==
- Warfare Optics, 2017
- Break Loose, 2017
- Witchcraft in the Pews, 1997 ISBN 9781629118581
- Elephants in the Church, 2014
- Spiritual Warfare, 2013
- Wisdom Walk, 2012
- Love Dating & Marriage, 2008
- More of Him, 2006
- Looking for Love, 2004
- Authority Abusers, 2002
- When loving you is wrong, 1997
- Empowered from Above, 2002
- Crazy House Sane House, 2001
- The Little Boy in Me, 2000
- The Battle Plan, 2003
- Throw Off What Holds You Back, 2003
- This is War, 2001
- 101 Questions Women Ask About Relationships, 1999
- No Suitable Mate, 2004
- Oppressionless, 1998
- Living by the Word, 2005
