= Ohio Employee Ownership Center =

The Ohio Employee Ownership Center (OEOC) is an organization based at Kent State University which provides employees of businesses in Ohio with resources for establishing Employee Share Ownership Plans (ESOP) through worker buyouts of companies.

The organization's first effort was the attempted worker buyout of the Atlantic Foundry Company from the Reymann family under the terms of an ESOP. However, a lawsuit brought by 125 foundry retirees seeking the resumption of health and life insurance benefits derailed the ESOP negotiations, and the plant closed in 1989. OEOC has since helped in successful efforts at ESOPs for such companies as DimcoGray.

The organization has served as the inspiration for similar organizations which bring organized labor and cooperative federations together, such as the Prairie Labor-Worker Co-op Council (a collaboration between the Canadian Worker Cooperative Federation and Canadian Labour Congress).

== See also ==
- U.S. Federation of Worker Cooperatives
