= Jimmy Bloomer (footballer, born 1926) =

Scottish footballer

Personal information
- Full name: James Bloomer
- Date of birth: 10 April 1926
- Place of birth: Rutherglen, Scotland
- Date of death: 7 December 2011 (aged 85)
- Place of death: Grimsby, England
- Position: Inside forward

Senior career*
Years	Team	Apps	(Gls)
1943–1948	Strathclyde		
1948–1949	Hull City	4	(2)
1949–1955	Grimsby Town	109	(42)
1955–195?	King's Lynn		
- * Club domestic league appearances and goals

James Bloomer (10 April 1926 – 7 December 2011) was a Scottish professional footballer who played as an inside forward. His son, also named Jimmy, also played for Grimsby Town.
