= Philip Bloom =

Philip Bloom may refer to:

- Philip Bloom (businessman), American businessman
- Philip Bloom (filmmaker) (born 1971), British filmmaker
