= Bloomer potato =

Potato variety

Bloomer
- Genus: Solanum
- Species: Solanum tuberosum
- Cultivar: 'Bloomer'
- Origin: County Clare, Ireland, 1936

Bloomer is a potato variety. Bloomers produce round purplish-blue tubers with fairly deep eyes. The flesh is cream coloured.

The bloomer potato produces an abundance of beautiful white flowers, which presumably helped name the variety. Davidson (1936) described this as an old variety found growing in the Midlands of Ireland but of no commercial value. It was noted by Kehoe (1986) as being unique to the Irish potato collection.
