= Millard Bloomer =

American fencer (1899–1974)

Personal information
- Born: June 10, 1899 New York City, United States
- Died: July 2, 1974 (aged 75) Tulsa, Oklahoma, United States

Sport
- Sport: Fencing

Millard Julian Bloomer Jr. (June 10, 1899 – July 2, 1974) was an American fencer. He competed in the individual foil event at the 1920 Summer Olympics.
