= Portrait of Carolus-Duran =

Painting by John Singer Sargent

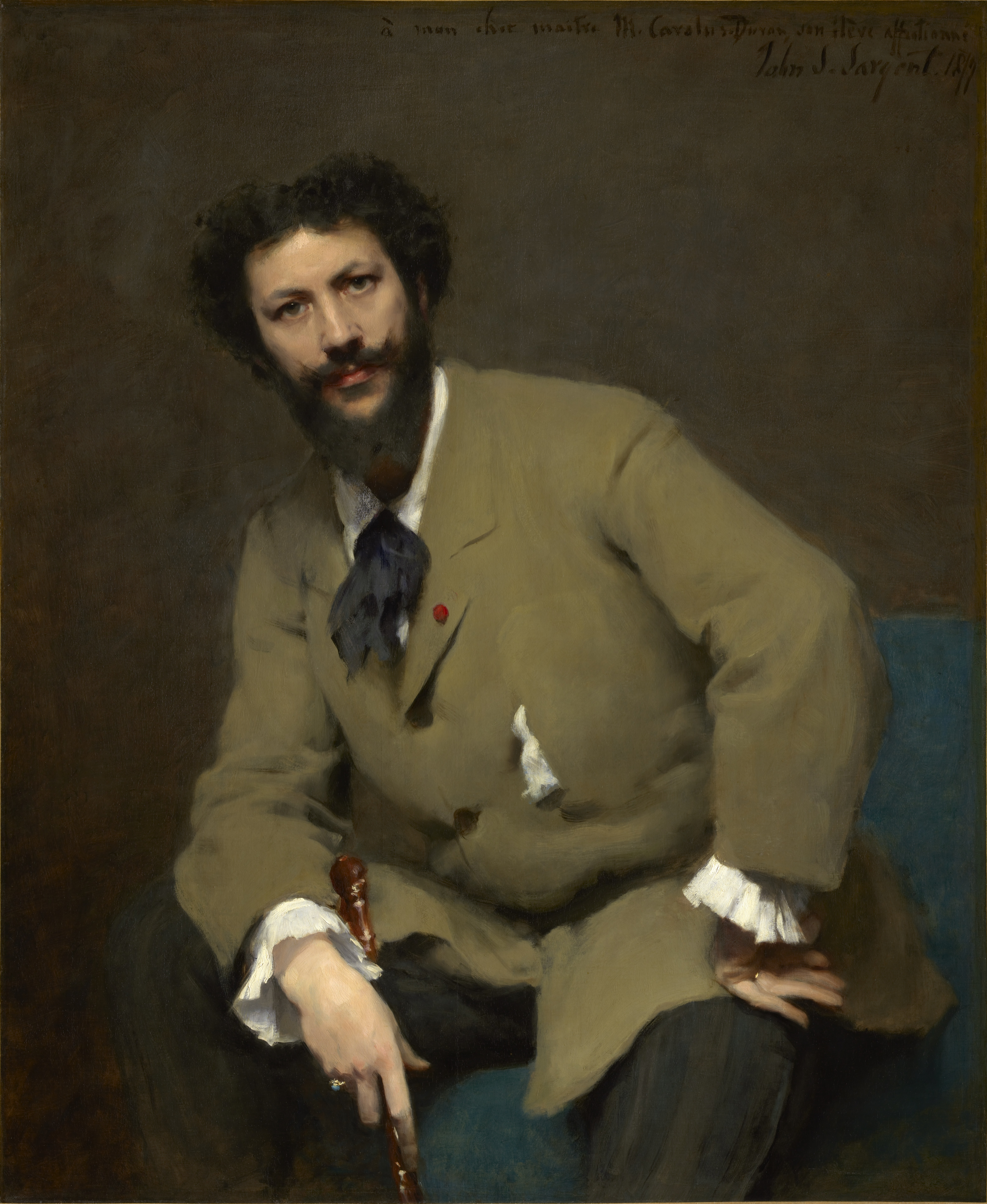
- Artist: John Singer Sargent
- Year: 1879
- Type: Oil on canvas, portrait painting
- Dimensions: 116.8 cm × 96 cm (46.0 in × 38 in)
- Location: Clark Art Institute, Massachusetts

Portrait of Carolus-Duran is an 1879 portrait painting by the American artist John Singer Sargent. It depicts his fellow artist Carolus-Duran, who had taught Singer Sargent in his Paris atelier. The Italian-born Singer Sargent had moved to the French capital to study under Carolus-Duran who was known for his glamourous portraits of figures of the Belle Époque. The young painter's talent impressed his teacher who singled him out as his most gifted pupil. He is depicted as a dashing figure in morning clothes, holding a cane and wearing the red lapel pin of the Legion of Honour.

Singer-Sargent later settled in Britain and became a prominent member of the Royal Academy, well known for his portraits of High society figures of the late Victorian Era. The painting was displayed at the Salon of 1879 held at the Palace of Industry in Paris.Today the pictures is part of the collection of the Clark Art Institute in Williamstown, Massachusetts, having been acquired in 1919.

== See also ==
- List of works by John Singer Sargent

== Bibliography ==
- Adelson, Warren. Sargent's Venice. Yale University Press, 2006.
- Conrads, Margaret C. American Paintings and Sculpture at the Sterling and Francine Clark Art Institute. Hudson Hills Press, 1990.
- Fisher, Paul. The Grand Affair: John Singer Sargent in His World. Picador, 2023.
