= Lucy Bloom =

South African businesswoman (born 1973)

Lucy Flamingo Bloom
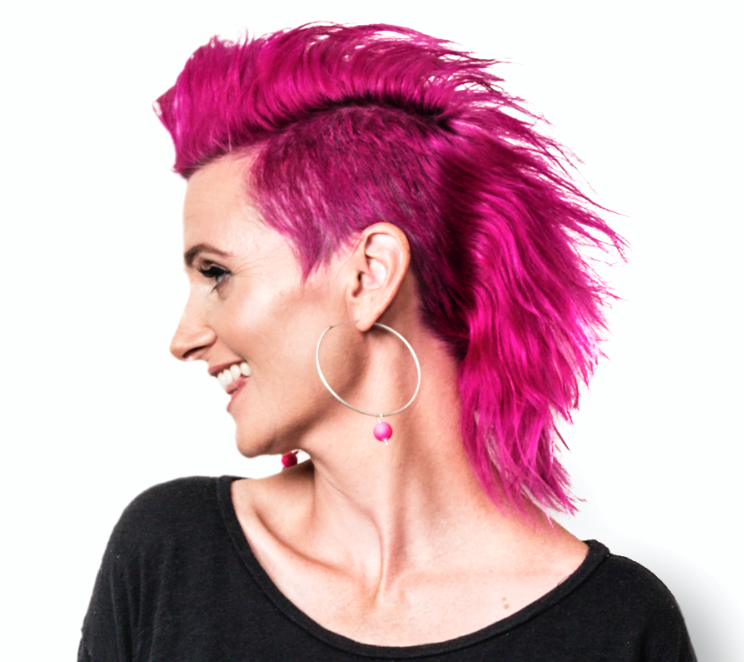
- Bloom in April 2014
- Born: Lucy Schaffler; 26 November 1973 (age 52); Johannesburg, South Africa
- Other name: Lucy Perry
- Occupations: Speaker, author, consulting CEO
- Website: thelucybloom.com

Lucy Bloom (born Lucy Schaffler; 26 November 1973) is the former Chief Executive Officer (CEO) of Sunrise Cambodia and the former CEO of Hamlin Fistula Ethiopia. She is now a full time speaker and author.

== Personal life ==
Bloom was born in 1973 in Johannesburg, South Africa. Bloom was married in 1995, separated in 2015 and divorced in 2019. She has three children and lives in Sydney, Australia.

== Career ==
Bloom worked for a short time as a jillaroo after graduating from high school before dropping out of university. Later, she worked at advertising agency Pilgrim International on cause-related accounts such as Amnesty International and World Vision before she established her own boutique advertising agency, Pure Graphics, which she led for 20 years. In 2004 she trained as a doula and created a childbirth education program for men, Beer + Bubs.

Bloom began volunteering in communications for Hamlin Fistula Ethiopia in 2004, and became a prodigious fundraiser; in 2012 was appointed CEO of the organization. But in 2015, Bloom testified before the Royal Commission into Institutional Responses to Child Sexual Abuse about abuse she suffered at the hands of a former schoolmaster—and lost her job a month later. Hamlin Fistula merely said "Lucy Perry has now left Hamlin"; Bloom herself said she was devastated. In October 2015 Bloom was appointed CEO (Australia) of Sunrise Cambodia, a Cambodia-based not-for-profit founded by Geraldine Cox. Cox offered Bloom the position the day after appearing on the ABC program Australian Story.

In July 2017 Bloom joined Inspiring Rare Birds as executive director. In her time there she launched a women-only speaker agency and media hub. Bloom left the role in December 2017, to finish her second book which was published in April 2019.

== Public life ==
=== Knox Grammar testimony ===
In March 2015 Lucy Bloom gave evidence against former Knox Grammar headmaster Ian Paterson in the Royal Commission into Institutionalised Responses to Child Sex Abuse. Bloom testified that she was indecently assaulted by Paterson while at Roseville College at the age of 15 in 1989. Bloom's claims were supported in court the next day by a witness who remained anonymous. Paterson strongly denied the allegation and was supported by another teacher who was present during the rehearsal.

== Controversies ==
=== Australian Graphic Awards Design Association ===
On November 14, 2015 Bloom attended an Australian Graphic Awards Design Association (AGDA) award night and tweeted about the lack of gender representation at the awards. There were two male MCs and only one woman spoke for the event's entirety. Bloom was later accused of slander and threatened with legal action by AGDA, threats which were found to be baseless as an association cannot sue for defamation.

=== "Poverty Porn" ===
In 2016, under Bloom's leadership, and with full board approval, Sunrise Cambodia launched a fundraising campaign that portrayed a Cambodian child as an unkempt sex worker. The campaign was denounced by child protection organizations in Australia as being unethical and exploitative, dubbing it "poverty porn". Bloom defended the use of the images as well within the ACFID code of conduct

== Publications ==
- Cheers to Childbirth (Flamingo Publishing, 2010, 2020)
- From Lads to Dads (Flamingo Publishing, 2020)
- Get the Girls Out (HarperCollins, 2019; Flamingo Publishing, 2021)
- The Manuscript (Flamingo Publishing, 2023)
