= Jimmy Bloomer (footballer, born 1947) =

Scottish footballer

Personal information
- Full name: James Moore Bloomer
- Date of birth: 22 August 1947 (age 79)
- Place of birth: Glasgow, Scotland
- Height: 5 ft 10 in (1.78 m)
- Position: Defender

Senior career*
Years	Team	Apps	(Gls)
1964–1969	Grimsby Town	52	(0)
1969–1970	Worksop Town		
1970–19??	Grantham		
- * Club domestic league appearances and goals

James Moore Bloomer (born 22 August 1947) is a Scottish former professional footballer who played as a defender. His father, also named Jimmy, also played for Grimsby Town.
