= Hiram Reynolds Bloomer =

American painter

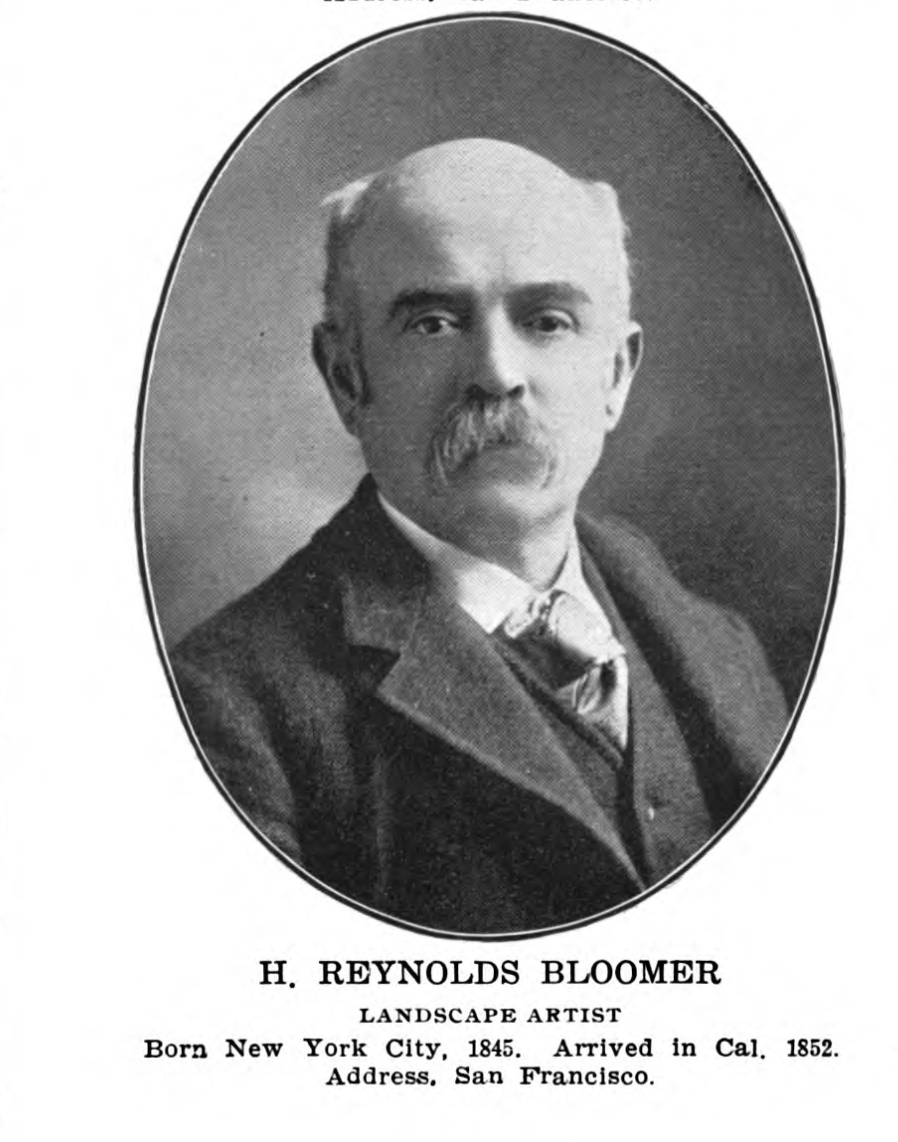
- Born: December 19, 1845; New York City, New York, U.S.
- Died: 1910 or June 3, 1911

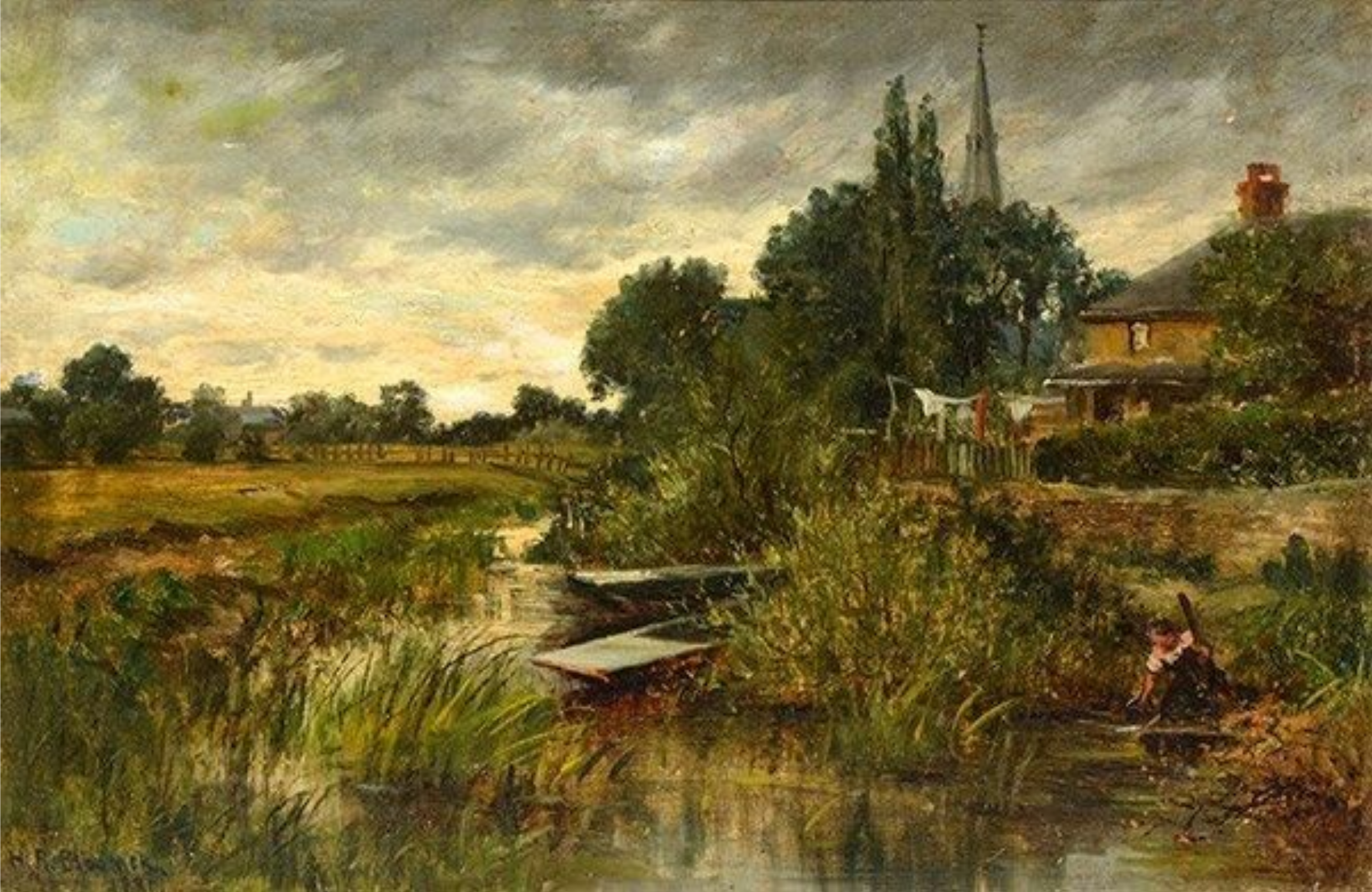
House on the River, 1881 painting by Hiram Reynolds Bloomer

Hiram Reynolds Bloomer (December 19, 1845 – 1910 or June 3, 1911) was an American painter.

In 1872, Bloomer was a founding member of the Bohemian Club of San Francisco. In 1874 he moved to Paris, France, where he exhibited in the 1877 Paris Salon. He returned to the United States in 1880, moving first to New York, and then California two years later.

His work is included in the collection of Emery Walker House, Oxford.
