= Blom (surname) =

Blom is a surname of Scandinavian, German and Dutch origin. Blom is a Swedish, Danish, Norwegian and Afrikaans term for bloom or flower. In Dutch it is a variant of bloem meaning flour or flower.

== Geographical distribution ==
As of 2014, 30.3% of all known bearers of the surname Blom were residents of South Africa (frequency 1:3,229), 29.6% of the Netherlands (1:1,035), 16.4% of Sweden (1:1,092), 7.7% of the United States (1:84,662), 3.0% of Denmark (1:3,404), 2.2% of Finland (1:4,588), 2.1% of Norway (1:4,433), 1.7% of Germany (1:88,260), 1.3% of Australia (1:33,484) and 1.2% of Canada (1:54,355).

In Sweden, the frequency of the surname was higher than national average (1:1,092) in the following counties:

1. Gävleborg County (1:499)
2. Uppsala County (1:584)
3. Jämtland County (1:626)
4. Västmanland County (1:750)
5. Jönköping County (1:791)
6. Värmland County (1:841)
7. Södermanland County (1:892)
8. Dalarna County (1:903)
9. Västra Götaland County (1:904)
10. Norrbotten County (1:936)
11. Örebro County (1:1,019)

In the Netherlands, the frequency of the surname was higher than national average (1:1,035) in the following provinces:

1. North Holland (1:752)
2. Utrecht (1:833)
3. South Holland (1:846)
4. Flevoland (1:906)
5. Gelderland (1:941)

In South Africa, the frequency of the surname was higher than national average (1:3,229) in the following provinces:

1. Northern Cape (1:1,037)
2. Eastern Cape (1:1,433)
3. Western Cape (1:1,928)
4. Free State (1:2,365)
5. North West (1:2,424)

== Notable people named Blom ==
- Alice Blom (born 1980), Dutch volleyball player
- Anna Blom (born 1976), Swedish curler
- Anton Blom (1924–2012), Norwegian journalist and author
- August Blom (1869–1947), Danish film director
- Birger Blom-Kalstø (1940–2011), Norwegian politician
- Carl Magnus Blom (1737–1815), Swedish physician and apostle of Linnaeus
- Carl Peter Blom (1762–1818), Swedish sailor
- Christian Blom (1782–1861), Norwegian ship owner and composer
- Christian Theodor Oker-Blom (1822–1900), Finnish general
- David Blom (born 1998), American politician
- Donald Blom (1949–2023), American suspected serial killer
- Edward Blom (born 1970), Swedish archivist
- Ellen Blom (born 1979), Norwegian ski mountaineer
- Eric Blom (1888–1959), Swiss-born British music lexicographer of Danish origin
- Frans Blom (1893–1963), Danish explorer and archeologist
- Fredrik Blom (1781–1853), Swedish architect
- Fredrik C. Blom (1893–1970), Norwegian businessperson
- Gertrude Blom (1901–1993), Swiss journalist, anthropologist, photographer
- Gijs Blom (born 1997), Dutch actor
- Gustav Peter Blom (1785–1869), Norwegian politician
- Gustava Kielland née Blom (1800–1889), Norwegian missionary pioneer
- Hans Blom (born 1943), Dutch historian, director of the NIOD
- Hans Jensen Blom (1812–1875), Norwegian politician
- Hans Willem Blom (born 1947), Dutch Professor of Social and Political Philosophy
- Herman Blom (1885–1963), Dutch actor, screenwriter and playwright
- Holger Blom (1905–1965), Danish fashion designer
- Ida Blom (1931–2016), Norwegian historian
- Ingrid Blom Sheldon (born 1945), U.S. mayor
- Jandré Blom (born 1984), South African rugby union player
- Jasper Blom (born 1965), Dutch jazz saxophonist
- Jassina Blom (born 1994), Belgian footballer
- Jyrki Blom (born 1962), Finnish javelin thrower
- Kaj Blom (1925–1989), Danish chess master
- Kees Blom (born 1946), Dutch ecologist
- Kevin Blom (born 1974), Dutch football referee
- Kimmo Blom (born 1970), Finnish vocalist and stage artist
- Kirsti Blom (born 1953), Norwegian author
- Knut Blom (1916–1996), Norwegian judge
- Laura Betterly-Blom (fl. 1990s–2000s), U.S. "Spam Queen"
- Louis Blom-Cooper (1926–2018), British lawyer and writer
- Maria Blom (born 1971), Swedish film director, dramatist and screenwriter
- Merel Blom (born 1986), Dutch equestrian
- Morné Blom (born 1989), Namibian rugby player
- Otto Blom (1887–1972), Dutch tennis player
- Per Blom (1946–2013), Norwegian film director
- Per Blom (born 1949), Norwegian sprint canoeist
- Philipp Blom (born 1970), German novelist and historian
- Piet Blom (1934–1999), Dutch architect
- Reinier Blom (1867–1943), Dutch gymnast
- Rens Blom (born 1977), Dutch pole vaulter
- Rolf Blom (fl. 1980s), Swedish cryptographer who developed the Blom's scheme protocol
- Thomas Blom Hansen (born 1958), Danish anthropologist
- Tobbe Blom (born 1975), Swedish magician and television host
- Tommy Blom (1947–2014), Swedish singer and radio host
- Tore Blom (1880–1961), Swedish athlete
- Viktor Blom (born 1990), Swedish poker player
- Wilma M. Blom, marine scientist

== See also ==
- Bloem, short for Bloemfontein
- Blohm
- Blome (disambiguation)
- Bloom (disambiguation)
- Blum (disambiguation)
