= Blume =

Blume may refer to:

== Music ==
- Blume (band), an Italian band

== Surname ==
- Anna and Bernhard Blume, German artistic photographers
- Astrid Blume (1872–1924), Danish educator and temperance advocate
- Bianka Blume (1843–1896), German opera singer
- Brian Blume (born 1950), American businessman, Dungeons & Dragons
- Carl Ludwig Blume (1796–1862), German-Dutch botanist
- Clemens Blume (1862–1932), Jesuit hymnologist
- Clint Blume (1898–1973), American baseball player
- Danny Blume (born 1960), American music producer, musician and composer
- David Blume, American permaculture teacher and entrepreneur
- Felix Blume (born 1984), known as Kollegah, German rapper
- Fred H. Blume (1875–1971), American justice from Wyoming
- Friedrich Blume (1893–1975), German musicologist
- Georg Blume (born 1963), German journalist
- Heinrich Blume, German politician
- Holger Blume (born 1973), German sprinter
- Joaquín Blume (1933–1959), Spanish gymnast
- John Blume (1909–2002), American structural engineer
- Judy Blume (born 1938), American author
- Lawrence E. Blume, American economist
- Lesley M. M. Blume, American journalist, historian, and author
- Marc Blume (born 1973), German sprinter
- Marco Blume, German Magic: The Gathering player
- Markus Blume (born 1975), German politician
- Martin Blume, American physicist
- Pernille Blume (born 1994), Danish swimmer
- Peter Blume (1906–1992), American painter and sculptor
- Ray Blume (born 1958), American basketball player
- Renate Blume (born 1944), German actress
- Ricardo Blume (born 1933), Peruvian actor and theater director
- Robert Blume (1868–1937), American sailor, Medal of Honor recipient
- Thaïs Blume (born 1984), Spanish actress
- Veronica Blume (born 1977), Spanish model and actress
- Walter Blume, multiple people

== Fictional ==
- Blume (Organization), a fictional organization, which appears in Watch Dogs, Watch Dogs 2, and Watch Dogs: Legion.

== See also ==
- Blume Bl.502, a family of four-seat light aircraft designed in West Germany by Dr Walter Blume in the late 1950s
- Blume High School, a historic building in downtown Wapakoneta, Ohio, United States
- Blume in Love, a 1973 film written and directed by Paul Mazursky
- Desert Blume, Alberta, a hamlet in Canada
- Martin Blume Jr. Farm, a historic home and farm in Allen County, Indiana, United States
- Blum (disambiguation)
- Bloom (disambiguation)
- Bluma (disambiguation)
