= Bloom =

Bloom or blooming may refer to:

== Science and technology ==
=== Biology ===
- Bloom, one or more flowers on a flowering plant
- Algal bloom, a rapid increase or accumulation in the population of algae in an aquatic system
- Jellyfish bloom, a collective noun for a large group of jellyfish
- Epicuticular wax bloom, a whitish haze due to small crystals of wax, occurring on the surface of many fruits
- Bloom syndrome, an autosomal recessive human genetic disorder that predisposes the patient to a wide variety of cancer

=== Computing ===
- Bloom filter, a probabilistic method to find a subset of a given set
- Bloom (shader effect), a graphics effect used in modern 3D computer games
- Bloom (software), a generative music application for the iPhone and iPod Touch
- BLOOM (language model), an open-source large language model

=== Art conservation ===
- Wax bloom, an efflorescence of wax or stearic acid affecting oil pastels
- Saponification in art conservation, a chalky white efflorescence on old oil paintings
- Bloom, pigment migration from wetter to drier surfaces of a watercolor painting

=== Other science and technology ===
- Bloom (bloomery) (sponge iron), a porous mass of iron and slag produced in a bloomery
- Bloom (casting), a semi-finished metal casting
- Bloom (sulfur), the migration of sulfur to the exterior of a rubber
- Bloom (test), a test to measure the strength of a gel or gelatin
- Blooming (CCD), an effect that happens when a pixel in a CCD image sensor is overloaded
- Blooming (directed-energy weapon), an effect of laser beams and particle beams in the air
- Chocolate bloom, the appearance of white coating on chocolate
- Thermal blooming, an atmospheric effect on high-energy laser beams

== People ==
- Bloom (surname)

== Places ==
=== United States ===
- Bloom, Colorado, a ghost town
- Bloom, Kansas, an unincorporated community
- Bloom, Wisconsin, a town
- Bloom City, Wisconsin, an unincorporated community
- Blooming, Oregon, an unincorporated community
- Bloom Creek (disambiguation)
- Bloom's Lake, a lake in Minnesota
- Bloom Township (disambiguation)

== Arts and entertainment ==
- Bloom (musical), a 2023 Australian musical by Tom Gleisner and Katie Weston
- Bloom (novel), a 1998 science fiction novel by Wil McCarthy
- Bloom (2003 film), award-winning Irish film
- Bloom (2021 film), a 2021 Tamil short film
- Bloom (TV series), a 2019 Australian TV series
- Bloom (Winx Club), the main character of the Winx Club animated series
- Bloom County, American comic strip by Berkeley Breathed
- The Brothers Bloom, a 2009 movie
- Bloom.fm, a former music application and streaming service
- Bloom (music venue), an alternative music club in Mezzago, Italy
- Bloom (mod), 2019 game mod created by Bloom Team

=== Music ===
==== Artists ====
- Bloom, one of the many stage names of Dutch singer Bloem de Ligny
- Bloom 06, Italian electronic duo

==== Albums ====
- Bloom (Billy Pilgrim album), 1995
- Bloom (Audio Adrenaline album), 1996
- Bloom (Tasmin Archer album), 1996
- Bloom (Beach House album), 2012
- Bloom (Caligula's Horse album), 2015
- Bloom (Lewis Capaldi EP), 2017
- Bloom (Jeff Coffin album), 2005
- Bloom (Gabriel & Dresden album), 2004
- Bloom (Eric Johnson album), 2005
- Bloom (Lights & Motion album), 2018
- Bloom (Machine Gun Kelly album), 2017
- Bloom (The McDades album), 2006
- Bloom (Lou Rhodes album), 2007
- Bloom (RÜFÜS album), 2016
- Bloom (Troye Sivan album), 2018
- Bloom (G.NA EP), 2012
- Bloom (Of Mice & Men EP), 2021
- Bloom (Red Velvet album), 2022
- Bloom (Durand Bernarr album), 2025
- Blooming (album), album by Ami Suzuki, 2010

==== Songs ====
- "Bloom" (The Paper Kites song), 2010
- "Bloom" (Gain song), 2012
- "Bloom" (Troye Sivan song), 2018
- "The Bloom" (Yoasobi song), 2026
- "Bloom", by Baroness from Stone, 2023
- "Bloom", by Between the Buried and Me from The Parallax II: Future Sequence, 2012
- "Bloom", by Caligula's Horse from Bloom, 2015
- "Bloom (Return to Dust)", by Code Orange from Love Is Love/Return to Dust, 2012
- "Bloom", by Doechii from Alligator Bites Never Heal, 2024
- "Bloom", by (G)I-dle from I Sway, 2024
- "Bloom", by Gigolo Aunts from Full-On Bloom, 1991
- "Bloom", by Of Mice & Men from Echo, 2021
- "Bloom", by Poppy from Flux, 2021
- "Bloom", by Radiohead from The King of Limbs, 2011
  - "(ocean) bloom", Radiohead and Hans Zimmer's 2017 reworking of the song that was recorded for television series Blue Planet II
- "Bloom", by Scale the Summit from Carving Desert Canyons, 2009
- "Bloom", by Turnover from Magnolia, 2013
- "Bloom", by Twice from With You-th, 2024
- "Bloom", by The Velvet Teen from Cum Laude!, 2006
- "Blooming", by Band-Maid from Conqueror, 2019
- "Bloomin'", by Park Bo-gum, 2019

== Organisations ==
- Bloom (store), a US supermarket chain operated by Food Lion LLC
- Bloomberry, an amusement holding company traded as BLOOM
- Bloom Brothers Department Stores, a defunct chain of department stores in Pennsylvania and Maryland, US
- Bloom Festival, Ireland's largest gardening show
- Bloom's restaurant, England's longest-standing kosher restaurant
- Club Blooming, a football (soccer) club and academy from Santa Cruz de la Sierra, Bolivia
- Bloom (company) an American independent film entertainment company
- Bloom Books, an imprint of Sourcebooks
- Bloom Energy

== Other uses ==
- Bloom's taxonomy, a classification of learning objectives
- "Blooming", a less offensive version of the expletive attributive bloody
- Bloom, a concept developed by Tiqqun representing an alienated individual in capitalist society

== See also ==
- Blum (disambiguation)
- Blume (disambiguation)
- Bloomberg (disambiguation)
- Bloomfield (disambiguation)
- Blumenthal (disambiguation)
- Bloomer (disambiguation)
- In Bloom (disambiguation)
