= Bloom Township, Kansas =

Bloom Township, Kansas may refer to the following places:

- Bloom Township, Clay County, Kansas
- Bloom Township, Ford County, Kansas
- Bloom Township, Osborne County, Kansas

== See also ==
- List of Kansas townships
- Bloom Township (disambiguation)
