= Blüm =

Blüm (German pronunciation: [blʏm]), also alternatively spelled Bluem, is a German surname.

Notable people with this surname include:

- John Bluem (born 1953), American football player
- Norbert Blüm (1935–2020), German politician
- Rainer Blüm, German criminal

== See also ==
- Blüm machine gun
- Bloom (disambiguation)
- Blum (disambiguation)
- Blume (disambiguation)
