= Blumkin =

Blumkin is an Ashkenazi surname, coined from Yiddish Blum - 'flower'. Notable people with the surname include:

- Rose Blumkin (1893–1998), American businesswoman
- Yakov Blumkin (1900–1929), Russian revolutionary and spy

== See also ==
- Blume#Surname
- Blum (surname)
