= Hans Blum =

Hans Blum may refer to:

- Hans Blum (journalist) (1841–1910), German journalist
- Hans Blum (musician) (1928–2024), German musician
