= Richard Anthony =

Richard Anthony may refer to:

- Richard Anthony (politician) (1875–1962), Irish politician
- Richard Anthony (singer) (1938–2015), French singer
- Richard Anthony (director), Indian film director; see Bloom (2021 film)
- Richard Anthony (2023 film), a Kannada language film with Rakshit Shetty
