= Hans Blom =

Hans Blom may refer to:

- Hans Jensen Blom (1812–1875), Norwegian politician and clergyman
- Hans Blom (historian) (born 1943), Dutch historian, former director of the NIOD
- Hans Blom (philosopher) (born 1947), Dutch philosopher, Grotius expert
