= Blum =

Blum may refer to:

== Places ==
- Kfar Blum, a kibbutz in Israel

=== United States ===
- Blum, Texas, a town
- Blum Basin Falls, a waterfall in Washington
- Blum Lakes, six lakes in Washington

== Science and technology ==
- Blum axioms, in computational complexity theory
- Blum integer, in mathematics
- Blum's speedup theorem, in computational complexity theory

== Other uses ==
- Blum (surname), including a list of people with the name
- Blum, a company manufacturing hinges in Austria named after the founder Julius Blum
- Blum (film), a 1970 Argentine film
- BLUM, an art gallery in Los Angeles, Tokyo, and New York
- Blum (podcast), a fiction podcast
- Blum House (1902), historic house in Vicksburg, Mississippi, U.S.; NRHP-listed

== See also ==
- Blüm
- The Lost Honour of Katharina Blum, a novel by Heinrich Böll
  - The Lost Honour of Katharina Blum (film)
- Bloom (disambiguation)
- Blume (disambiguation)
- Blom (surname)
