= Bloom Creek =

Bloom Creek may refer to:

- Bloom Creek (Madden Creek tributary), a stream in Missouri
- Bloom Creek (South Dakota), a stream in South Dakota
