= Blum (surname) =

Blum is a German surname and is derived from the word Blume, i.e. 'flower'. Similar names like 'Blume', 'Bluhm' or 'Blumhoff' may have the same origin. Notable people with the surname include:

== Arts ==
- Alex Blum (1889–1969), Hungarian-American comic book artist
- Alice Mavrogordato, born Alice Blum (1916–2000), Austrian-American artist and translator
- Edward Blum (architect) (1867–1944), French-American architect and designer
- George Blum (1870–1928), American architect
- Hans Blum (musician) (1928–2024), German musician
- Heinrich Blum (1884–1942), Czech-Jewish architect
- Jason Blum (born 1969), American film producer
- Jonathan Blum (writer, born 1967), American writer
- Jonathan Blum (writer, born 1972), American writer
- Mark Blum (1950–2020), American actor
- Matusja Blum (1914–1998), Bosnian pianist and teacher
- René Blum (impresario) (1878–1942), French Jewish theatrical impresario
- Robert Frederick Blum (1857–1903), American artist
- Sammy Blum (1889–1945), American actor
- Shirley Neilsen Blum (born 1932), American art historian and author
- Steven Blum (born 1960), American voice actor
- Tanya Roberts, born Victoria Leigh Blum (1949–2021), American actress

== Other ==
- Abraham Blum (1905–1943), Polish-Jewish activist
- Betiana Blum (born 1939), Argentine actress
- Brad Blum (born 1953), American businessman
- Dorothy Blum (1924–1980), American computer scientist and cryptanalyst
- Edward Blum (activist) (born 1952), American legal activist
- Emerik Blum (1911–1984), Bosnian businessman and politician
- Geoff Blum (born 1973), American baseball player
- Hans Blum (journalist) (1841–1910), German journalist
- H Steven Blum (born 1946), American military commander
- Heather Munroe-Blum (born 1950), Canadian academic and businesswoman
- Jake Blum (born 1994), American politician
- John Morton Blum (1921–2011), American historian
- Jonathon Blum (born 1989), American ice hockey player
- Lawrence Blum (born 1943), American philosopher
- Lenore Blum (born 1942), American mathematician and computer scientist
- Léon Blum (1872–1950), French politician, Prime Minister of France
- Manuel Blum (born 1938), Venezuelan-American computer scientist
- Paul Blum (1898–1981), American intelligence officer
- René Blum (politician) (1889–1967), Luxembourgish politician
- Richard C. Blum (1935–2022), American banker
- Robert Blum (1807–1848), German politician
- Robert Blum (fencer) (1928–2022), American fencer
- Rod Blum (born 1955), American politician
- Samuel E. Blum (1920–2013), American chemist and physicist
- Suzanne Blum (born 1978), American chemist
- Suzanne Blum (lawyer) (1898–1994), French lawyer and writer
- William Blum (1933–2018), American author and foreign policy critic
- Yehuda Zvi Blum (1931–2025), Slovak-born Israeli legal scholar and diplomat
