= Alcohol as Fuel =

Alcohol as Fuel may refer to:

- Ethanol fuel
- Alcohol and weight, calculating caloric density of ethyl alcohol
- Alcohol as Fuel (TV series), a 10-part how-to series written and hosted by David Blume
