= Bluma =

The name Bluma (Yiddish for "flower") may refer to:

== People ==
=== Given name ===
- Bluma Appel, a Canadian philanthropist and patron of the arts
- Bluma Tischler, a Polish-born Canadian pediatrician
- Bluma Zeigarnik, a Soviet psychologist and psychiatrist

=== Surname ===
- Dzintra Blūma, a Latvian slalom canoer
- Jaime Bluma, a former Major League Baseball pitcher
- Trevor Blumas, a Canadian actor and singer-songwriter

== Places ==
- Blumau Formation (Blum ~ au "meadow"), a geologic formation in Austria
- Blumau-Neurißhof, a town in the district of Baden in Lower Austria

== Miscellaneous ==
- Blumarine - an Italian fashion house

== See also ==
- Blum (disambiguation)
