= German Unity Day =

National Day of Germany

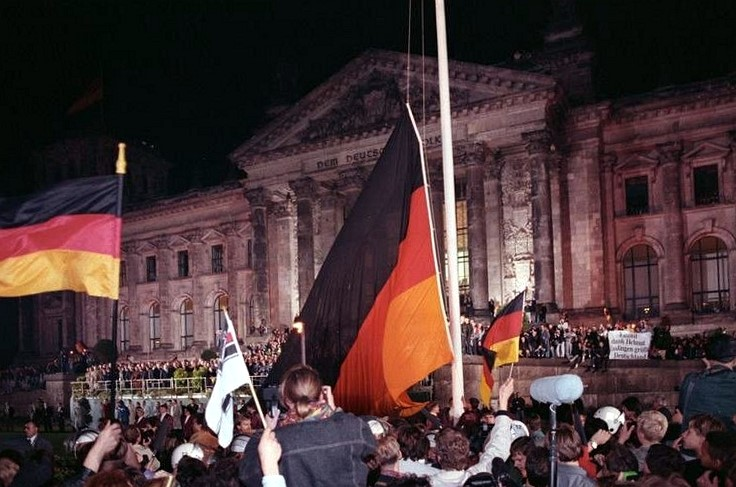
- The flag of unity at midnight of 3 October 1990 in front of the Reichstag
- Official name: German: Tag der Deutschen Einheit
- Observed by: Germany
- Significance: Commemorates the German reunification in 1990
- Date: 3 October
- Frequency: Annual

German Unity Day (German: Tag der Deutschen Einheit, pronounced [ˈtaːk deːɐ̯ ˈdɔʏtʃn̩ ˈʔaɪnhaɪt]) is the National Day of Germany, celebrated on 3 October as a public holiday. It commemorates German reunification in 1990 when the German Democratic Republic (East Germany) ceased to exist and joined the Federal Republic of Germany (West Germany), so that for the first time since 1945 there existed a single German state. German Unity Day on 3 October has been the German national holiday since 1990, when the reunification was formally completed.

An alternative choice to commemorate the reunification could have been the day the Berlin Wall came down: 9 November 1989, which coincided with the anniversary of the proclamation of the German Republic in 1918, and the defeat of Hitler's first coup in 1923. However, 9 November was also the anniversary of the first large-scale Nazi-led pogroms against Jews in 1938 (Reichspogromnacht), so the day was considered inappropriate as a national holiday (see 9 November in German history). Therefore, 3 October 1990, the day of the formal reunification, was chosen instead. It replaced the "German Unity Day" on 17 June, the national holiday of the Federal Republic of Germany from 1954.

== History ==
Germany has historically associated various dates with its nationhood and unity.

=== Imperial Germany ===
Before 1871, in the area where the single state of Germany now exists, different kingdoms and principalities existed. After the unification of Germany, and the Founding of the Empire 1871, there was still no common national holiday. The Sedantag was, however, celebrated every year on 2 September, recalling the decisive victory in the Franco-Prussian War on 2 September 1870.

Before the Empire was founded in 1872, there were calls for a national holiday, and there were three suggestions. No decision was made. Until 1873, the Sedantag was moved to 18 January or the day of the Frankfurt Treaty (10 May 1871). The Sedantag would soon also be celebrated at the universities and in many German cities. It never occurred to them to think about "Empire Parade" or "Emperor's Birthday". Some Culture Ministers of the states, especially in Prussia, decided that the Sedantag would be an official festival in schools. Upon many suggestions, the date of the Emperor's proclamation on 18 January would be established as day of remembrance. Emperor Wilhelm I declined this: "This was also the day of the first Prussian coronation of the king, which should not fall into the shadow of a united German holiday."

Despite this, the Day of the founding of the German Empire was still celebrated locally and nationally to some degree. These celebrations continued in the Weimar Republic and Nazi Germany. Following World War II, East Germany completely abandoned the holiday, while West Germany still celebrated it on a smaller scale. West Germany did acknowledge the centennial of the German Empire as the founding of the German state in 1871.

=== Weimar Republic ===
On 31 July 1919, the Weimar Constitution would be accepted in its form by the Weimar National Congress. In memorial of this "Hour of birth of democracy", 11 August was created as Constitution Day, because the President of Germany Friedrich Ebert, signed the constitution on this day.

=== National Socialism ===
Shortly after the Nazis took power in 1933 (the so-called Machtergreifung), May Day (1 May) was established as a national holiday in the German Reich. It was already celebrated as a "Day of the Labor Movement" since 1890, and also was part of the tradition for the May dance commemorating the Walpurgis Night. Immediately after the establishment of the holiday in 1933, the Nazis banned trade unions on 2 May 1933 and occupied their buildings as offices for the Nazi Movement. On 1 March 1939, Hitler declared 9 November (the day of the failed Beer Hall Putsch in 1923) as the "Memorial Day for the movement" as the national holiday.

=== Federal Republic of Germany ===
From 1954 to 1990, 17 June was an official holiday in the Federal Republic of Germany to commemorate the East German uprising of 1953, even with the name "German Unity Day". Since 1963, it was proclaimed by the President of the Federal Republic as "National Day of Memorial of the German People". However, by the mid-1960s as hope faded that the two Germanys would ever be re-united, this date became more of a holiday and day of recreation than a day to consider national unity. In the year 1990, the "German Unity Day" was celebrated twice, on this date and on 3 October.

=== German Democratic Republic ===
In East Germany, the Founding Day in 1949 was celebrated on 7 October as Republic Day, until the 40th anniversary in 1989.

== Decision for GDR's unity with the Federal Republic ==
The motive for setting the date of 3 October as the possible Day of Unity was decided by the Volkskammer, the East German parliament, on the impending economical and political collapse of the GDR. The Helsinki Conference was set for 2 October, at which the foreign ministers would be informed of the results of the Two-plus-Four talks.

At the beginning of July, the governments of both German states decided on the schedule: State elections in the GDR would be held on 14 October, and a Bundestag election for the entire country on 2 December.

The decision on the date was finally made on 22 August by the GDR's Minister-President, Lothar de Maizière, at a special session of the Volkskammer, which began at 9 p.m. After a heated debate, the President of the Volkskammer, Sabine Bergmann-Pohl, announced the results at 2:30 a.m. on 23 August:

The Volkskammer decides on the accession of the GDR to the Constitution of the Federal Republic of Germany according to Article 23 of the Basic Laws effective as of 3 October 1990. In the matter Nr. 201 there have been 363 votes. There were no invalid votes. 294 deputies have voted 'yes.' (Strong applause from CDU/DA, DSU, FDP, partly SPD and the deputies standing up in their seats.) 62 deputies have voted 'no', and 7 people abstained. This is a historic event. Ladies and Gentlemen, I believe that we have not made an easy decision, but today we have acted within our responsibilities of the voting rights of the citizens of the GDR. I thank everybody that this result was made possible by a consensus across party lines.

Gregor Gysi, Chairman of the SED-PDS, was visibly moved and made a personal statement: "Madame President! The Parliament has no more and no less decided on the downfall of the German Democratic Republic as of 3 October 1990". This statement was met by jubilant cheers from the CDU/DA, DSU and SPD.

=== Attempt to change the date of Unity Day ===
On 3 November 2004, the Federal Chancellor, Gerhard Schröder, suggested that the "German Unity Day" be celebrated on a Sunday, for economic reasons. Instead of 3 October, the National Reunification should be celebrated on the first Sunday of October. This suggestion received a lot of criticism from many sides, amongst them from Federal President Horst Köhler as well as the President of the Bundestag, Wolfgang Thierse. The demand worried a part of the population because of discontent for increased working hours would be seen as a provocation and devaluing the national holiday. In addition, fixing the Unity Day on the first Sunday of October would have meant that it would sometimes fall on 7 October, which happens to have been the national day of East Germany; this date would thus have been seen as commemorating the division of Germany rather than the reunification. The idea was dropped after a short but angry debate.

== Celebrations ==
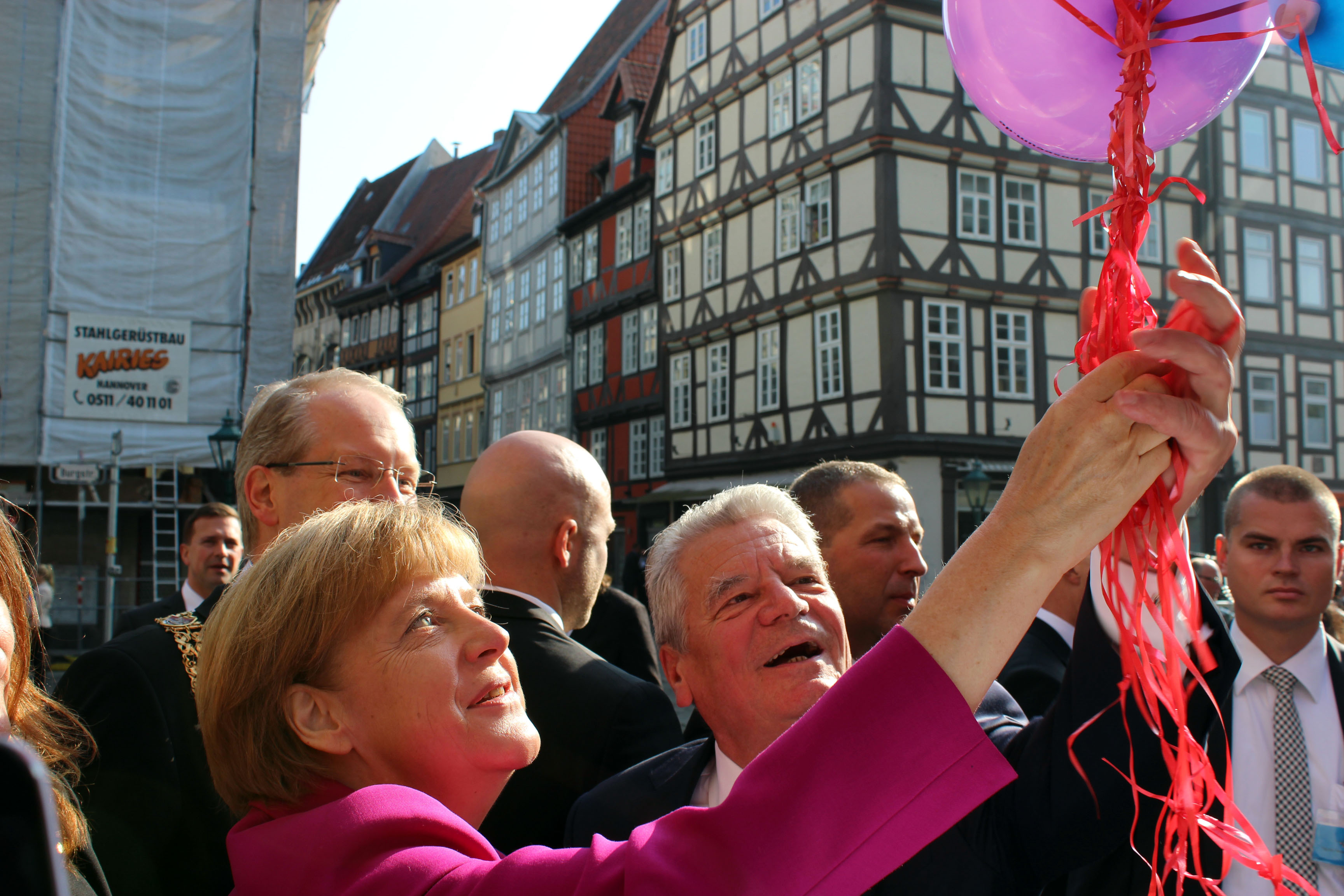
Chancellor Angela Merkel and President Joachim Gauck at the Bürgerfest (German Unity Day festivities) in Hannover in 2014

The Day of German Unity is celebrated each year with a ceremonial act and a citizen's festival (Bürgerfest).

The celebrations are hosted by a major city, usually the state capital, in the German state presiding over the Bundesrat in the respective year (a sequence determined by the Königstein Agreement). After Bonn in 2011, Frankfurt am Main was the second non-state capital to host the celebrations in 2015; however, both cities are significant in German political history (Bonn as former capital of West Germany and Frankfurt as the place of the Frankfurt Parliament of 1848–49).

- 1990 in Berlin, capital of Germany, reunited that year
- 1991 in Hamburg
- 1992 in Schwerin, state capital of Mecklenburg-Vorpommern
- 1993 in Saarbrücken, state capital of Saarland
- 1994 in Bremen, state capital of Bremen
- 1995 in Düsseldorf, state capital of North Rhine-Westphalia
- 1996 in Munich, state capital of Bavaria
- 1997 in Stuttgart, state capital of Baden-Württemberg
- 1998 in Hannover, state capital of Lower Saxony
- 1999 in Wiesbaden, state capital of Hesse
- 2000 in Dresden, state capital of Saxony
- 2001 in Mainz, state capital of Rhineland-Palatinate
- 2002 in Berlin
- 2003 in Magdeburg, state capital of Saxony-Anhalt
- 2004 in Erfurt, state capital of Thuringia
- 2005 in Potsdam, state capital of Brandenburg
- 2006 in Kiel, state capital of Schleswig-Holstein
- 2007 in Schwerin, state capital of Mecklenburg-Vorpommern
- 2008 in Hamburg
- 2009 in Saarbrücken, state capital of Saarland
- 2010 in Bremen
- 2011 in Bonn, former federal capital, instead of the state capital of North Rhine-Westphalia, Düsseldorf (Motto: "Freiheit Einheit Freude – Bewegt mehr" – "Liberty Unity Joy – Make a bigger difference")
- 2012 in Munich, state capital of Bavaria
- 2013 in Stuttgart, state capital of Baden-Württemberg
- 2014 in Hannover, state capital of Lower Saxony (Motto: "Einheit in Vielfalt" – "Unity in Diversity")
- 2015 in Frankfurt, largest city of Hesse (Motto: "Grenzen überwinden" – "Overcoming borders")
- 2016 in Dresden, state capital of Saxony (Motto: "Brücken bauen" – "Building bridges")
- 2017 in Mainz, state capital of Rhineland-Palatinate (Motto: "Zusammen sind wir Deutschland" – "Together we are Germany")
- 2018 in Berlin
- 2019 in Kiel, state capital of Schleswig-Holstein
- 2020 in Potsdam, state capital of Brandenburg
- 2021 in Halle, largest city of Saxony-Anhalt
- 2022 in Erfurt, state capital of Thuringia
- 2023 in Hamburg
- 2024 in Schwerin, state capital of Mecklenburg-Vorpommern
- 2025 in Saarbrücken, state capital of Saarland
- 2026 in Bremen

In addition, various celebrations are held in the federal capital Berlin, mainly based on the Straße des 17. Juni and around the Brandenburg Gate. State capitals and also other cities often have additional festivities. Furthermore, the Oktoberfest beer festival in Munich, which traditionally runs until the first Sunday in October, now runs until 3 October, if the Sunday in question falls on the first or second day of October. The celebrations in the host city always includes a festival and fireworks show.

=== Zipfelbund: compass communities ===
Zipfelbund – Compass Communities – locations

At the 1999 Day of German Unity celebration in Wiesbaden the Zipfelbund (Compass Confederation) was formalised. The Zipfelbund are the four communities at the cardinal compass points of Germany: North – List on the island of Sylt, West – Selfkant, South – Oberstdorf and East – Görlitz. Together, they always participate in the respective annual celebration to represent the modern borders of Germany.

Direction	Community	State	Coordinates	Population
North	List auf Sylt	Schleswig-Holstein	55°1′N 8°26′E	2,462
West	Selfkant	North Rhine-Westphalia	51°1′N 5°55′E	10,263
East	Görlitz	Saxony	51°9′N 14°59′E	56,461
South	Oberstdorf	Bavaria	47°25′N 10°17′E	9,974

== See also ==
- Unification Day (Bulgaria)
- Unity Day (Yemen)
