= Blohm =

Blohm is a surname. Notable people with the surname include:

- Hans Blohm C.M. (1927–2021), photographer and author
- Hermann Blohm (1848–1930), German businessman and co-founder of German company Blohm+Voss
- Irma Blohm (1909–1997), German politician
- Linn Blohm (born 1992), Swedish handball player for IK Sävehof and the Swedish national team
- Tom Blohm (1920–2000), Norwegian football player

== See also ==
- Blohm + Voss, a German shipbuilding and engineering works
- Blom
- Bohm (disambiguation)
