= 9 November in German history =

Date of many important events in German history

9 November has been the date of numerous events that are considered political turning points in modern German history, some of which also had international repercussions. Notable examples include the fall of the Berlin Wall in 1989, the beginning of the November pogroms in 1938 (German: Kristallnacht or Reichspogromnacht), the Munich Putsch in 1923, and the proclamation of the Republic in 1918 during the November Revolution in Berlin.

After the end of the Second World War, various historians and journalists coined the expression Schicksalstag (lit. 'Day of Fate' in German) for this date, but it only became widespread after the events of autumn 1989.

In remembrance of the November pogroms against German Jews in 1938, 9 November is a day of remembrance in Germany for the victims of Nazism — in addition to the official national Holocaust Memorial Day on 27 January and the anniversary of the liberation of the Auschwitz concentration camp (January 1945). 27 January is also the International Day of Remembrance of the victims of Nazism proclaimed by the General Assembly of the UN.

== Events ==
There are eight events in German history that are connected to 9 November, five of which had considerable historical consequences: the execution of Robert Blum in 1848, the end of the monarchies in 1918, the Hitler putsch attempt in 1923, the Nazi antisemitic pogroms in 1938 and the fall of the Berlin Wall in 1989.

=== Execution of Robert Blum ===
9 November 1848: After being arrested in the Vienna revolts, Robert Blum, one of the leading figures of the democrats in the Frankfurt Parliament and in the German revolutions, was executed. The execution can be seen as a symbolic event or forecast of the ultimate crushing of the German March Revolution in April and May 1849.

=== November revolution in Berlin ===
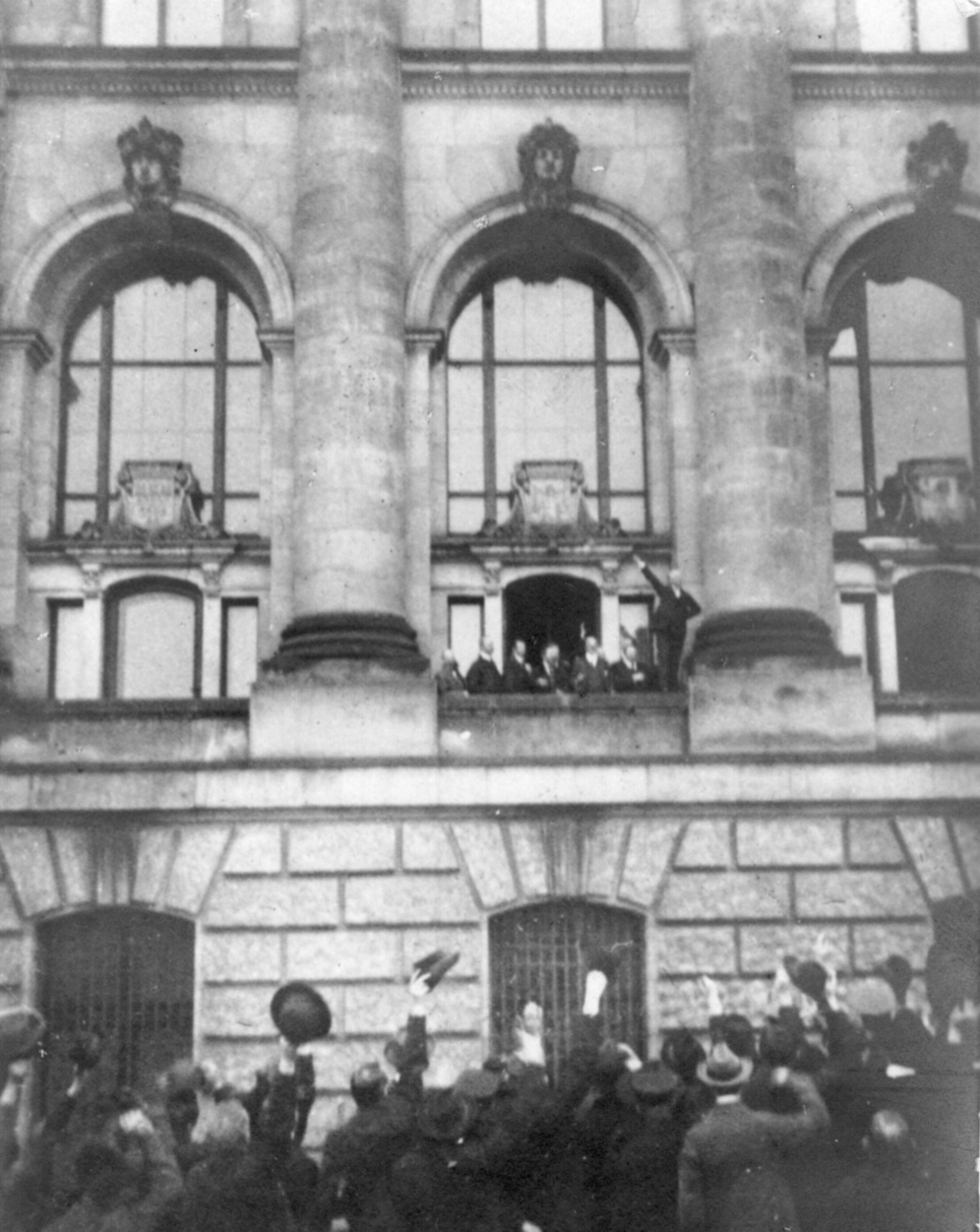
Philipp Scheidemann during the proclamation of the Republic on 9 November 1918

9 November 1918: During the November Revolution, in view of the imminent defeat of the German Empire in World War I, Chancellor Max von Baden announced the abdication of Wilhelm II before the Emperor had in fact abdicated and handed the chancellorship to Friedrich Ebert of the Social Democratic Party (SPD). Philipp Scheidemann, who would replace Ebert as head of government in 1919, proclaimed the German republic from a window of the Reichstag building. A few hours later, Karl Liebknecht, one of the leaders of the left-wing revolutionary Spartacus League (Spartakusbund), proclaimed a "Free Socialist Republic" from a balcony of the Berlin Palace. It was Scheidemann's intention to proclaim the republic before the communists did.

In the ensuing conflicts between the supporters of a socialist soviet republic and those of a pluralist parliamentary democracy, which in some areas resembled a civil war, the supporters of the soviet model were defeated. Liebknecht was assassinated two months later, together with Rosa Luxemburg, by members of the Guards Cavalry Rifle Division on 15 January. In the aftermath of the revolution, what came to be known later as the Weimar Republic was constituted in August 1919.

Der 9. November (The Ninth of November) is also the title of a 1920 novel by Bernhard Kellermann published in Germany that told the story of the German insurrection of 1918.

=== Hitler putsch in Munich ===
9 November 1923: The failed Beer Hall Putsch, from 8 to 9 November, marks an early emergence and provisional downfall of the Nazi Party as an important player in Germany's political landscape. Adolf Hitler, the leader of the NSDAP party, until then little known to the general public, attempted a coup against the democratic Reich government on the fifth anniversary of the proclamation of the Republic. Hitler's march through Munich was stopped in front of the Feldherrnhalle by Bavarian police who opened fire. Sixteen Nazis and four policemen were killed.

Hitler used the subsequent trial to stage himself as the leading figure of the Völkisch movement. He was sentenced to five years in prison but was released after nine months for good conduct. Only after 1930 would Hitler gain significant voter support, a process that would culminate in the Nazis' electoral victory of 1933. After his political takeover, he declared 9 November a national holiday, and every year a celebration in remembrance of the so-called Blutzeugen (blood-witnesses), the victims of the Beer Hall Putsch, took place. It was at one such ceremony, on the evening of 8 November 1939, that Georg Elser's failed bomb assassination attempt on Hitler took place in Munich's Bürgerbräukeller.

=== Reichspogromnacht ===
9 November 1938: Marked the culmination of what is today known as "Kristallnacht" (the Night of Broken Glass) or Reichspogromnacht, from 9 to 10 November, synagogues and Jewish property were burned and destroyed on a large scale, and more than four hundred Jews were killed or driven to suicide. In Nazi propaganda, the outrages, committed primarily by SA and SS members in civilian clothes, are portrayed as an expression of "popular anger" against the Jews. The event demonstrated that the antisemitic stance of the Nazi regime was not so "moderate" as it had partially appeared in earlier years and marked the transition from social exclusion and discrimination to open persecution of Jews under the dictatorship. After 10 November, about 30,000 Jews were arrested; many of them later died in concentration camps.

=== Hamburg University protest ===
9 November 1967: At the inauguration ceremony of the new rector of Hamburg University, students unfurled a banner with the slogan Unter den Talaren – Muff von 1000 Jahren (English: Under the gowns – Mustiness of a 1000 years), which would become the symbol of the protests of 1968. The motto alluded to propaganda that Nazi Germany was the Tausendjähriges Reich (English: Thousand-year Reich).

=== Attack at the Jewish Community Center in Berlin ===
9 November 1969: The left-wing radical, antisemitic and anti-zionist terrorist organization Tupamaros West-Berlin places a bomb in the Jewish Community Center in Berlin. However, the bomb did not explode.

=== Death of Holger Meins ===
9 November 1974: The imprisoned RAF terrorist Holger Meins dies after 58 days of hunger strike.

=== Fall of the Berlin Wall ===
9 November 1989: The fall of the Berlin Wall ended the separation of Germany and started a series of events that ultimately led to German reunification. 9 November was originally considered to be the date for German Unity Day, but because it was also the anniversary of Kristallnacht, this date was considered inappropriate as a national holiday. The date of the formal reunification of Germany, 3 October 1990, was therefore chosen as the date for this German national holiday, and it replaced 18 June, the celebration of the uprising of 1953 in East Germany. East Germany opened checkpoints on this day which allowed people to cross into West Germany.

== Photography gallery ==
9 November in German history

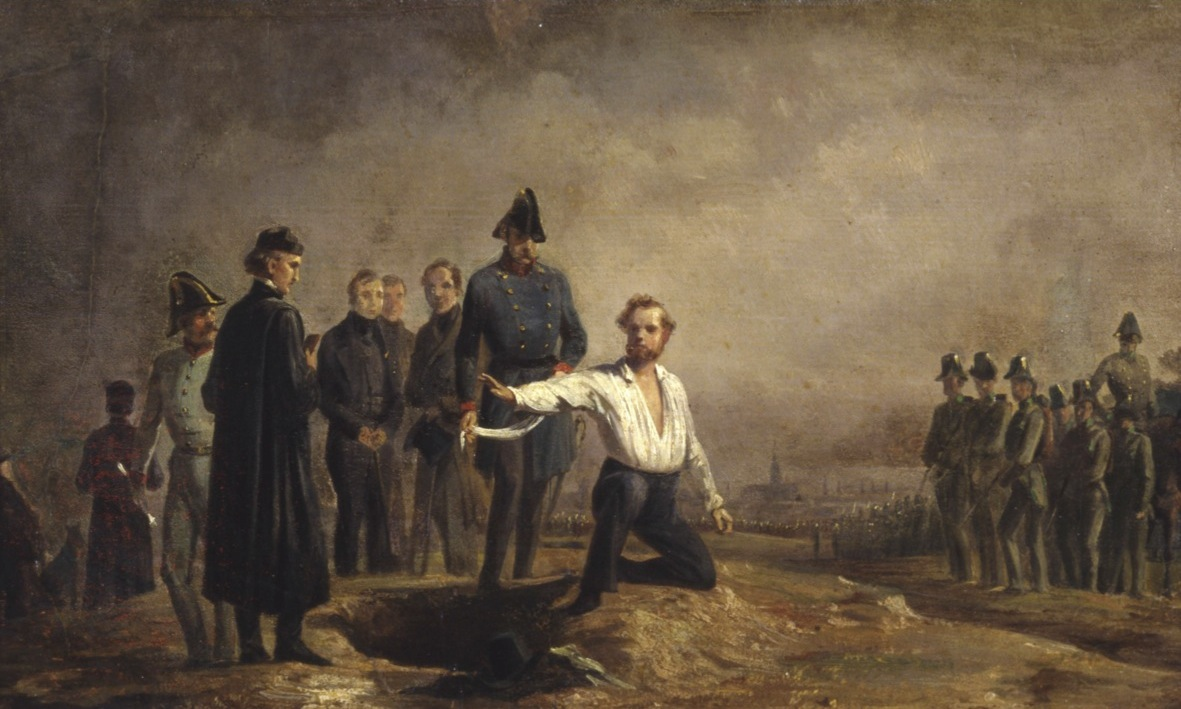
The execution of Robert Blum by Austrian troops, 9 November 1848.

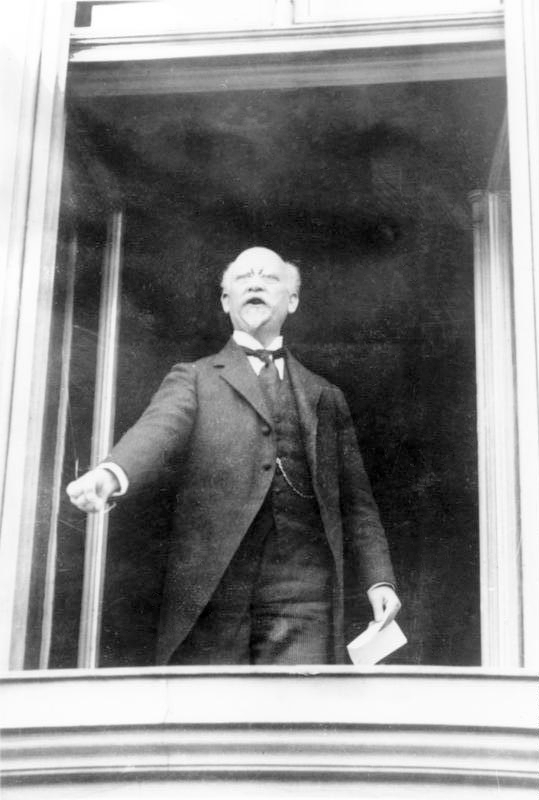
Berlin, Philipp Scheidemann proclaims the Republic, 9 November 1918.

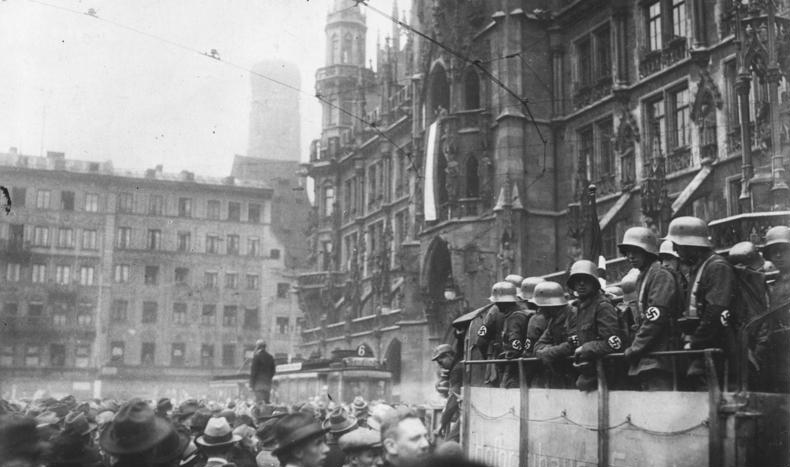
Munich Marienplatz during the failed Beer Hall Putsch, 8–9 November 1923.

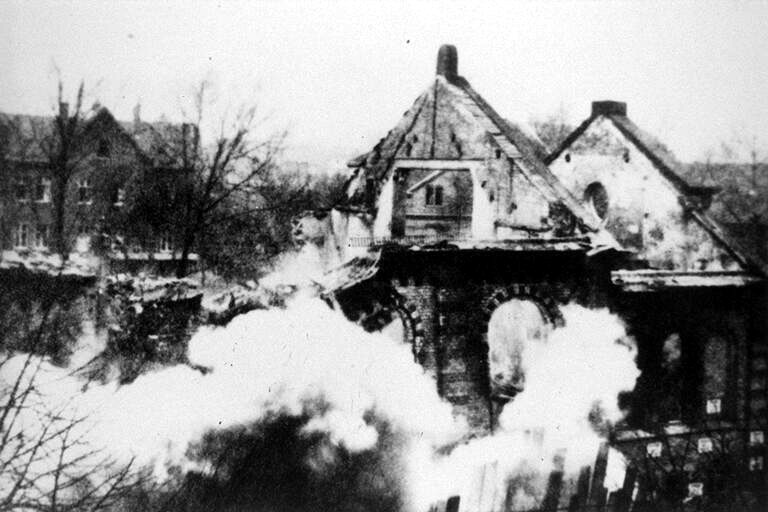
Burning synagogue in Eisenach during Kristallnacht, 9 November 1938.

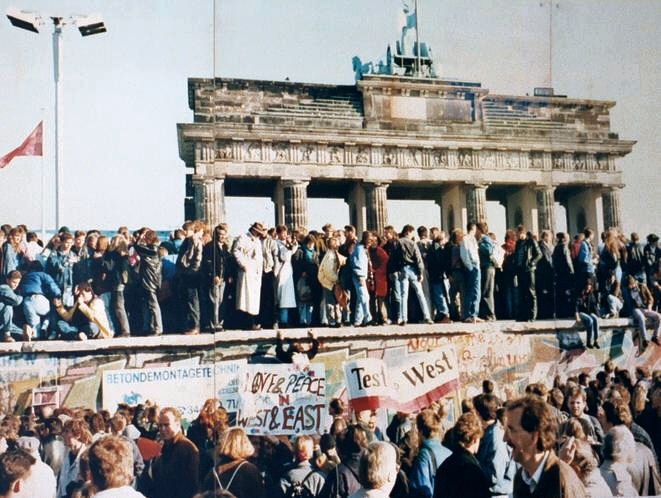
The fall of the Berlin Wall, 9–10 November 1989.
