= In Bloom (disambiguation) =

"In Bloom" is a 1992 song by Nirvana.

In Bloom may also refer to:

- In Bloom (film), a 2013 Georgian film
- "In Bloom" (Lilas Ikuta song), 2025
- "In Bloom" (Neck Deep song), 2017
- "In Bloom" (Zerobaseone song), 2023
- "In Bloom", a song by Moses Sumney from Græ

== See also ==
- Bloom (disambiguation)
