= Bloom Township =

Bloom Township may refer to:

- Bloom Township, Cook County, Illinois
- Bloom Township, Clay County, Kansas
- Bloom Township, Ford County, Kansas
- Bloom Township, Osborne County, Kansas, in Osborne County, Kansas
- Bloom Township, Nobles County, Minnesota
- Bloom Township, Stutsman County, North Dakota, in Stutsman County, North Dakota
- Bloom Township, Fairfield County, Ohio
- Bloom Township, Morgan County, Ohio
- Bloom Township, Scioto County, Ohio
- Bloom Township, Seneca County, Ohio
- Bloom Township, Wood County, Ohio
- Bloom Township, Pennsylvania
