= Zandvoort =

- Municipality
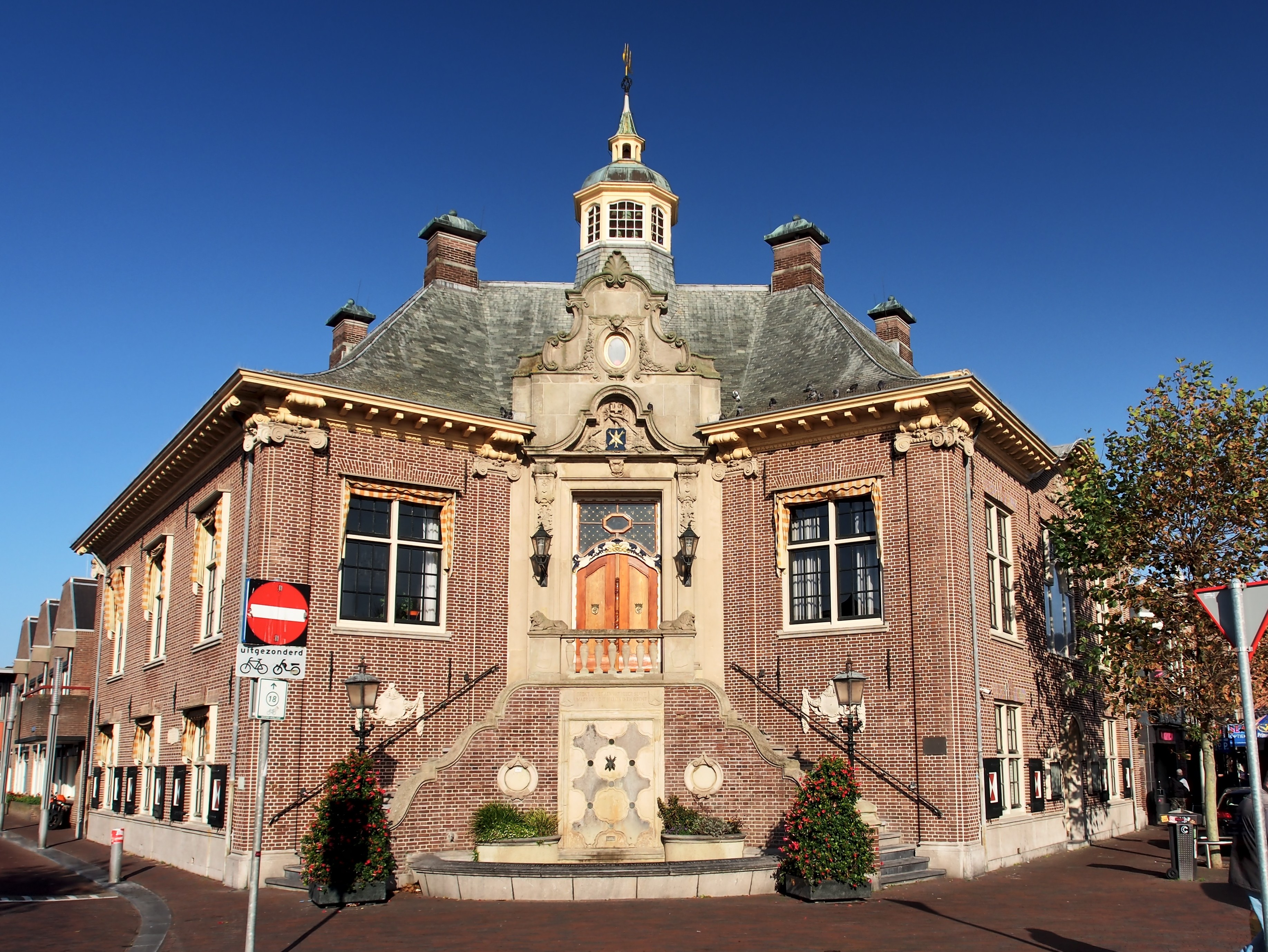
- Zandvoort Town Hall

- Flag Coat of arms

- Location in North Holland
- Coordinates: 52°22′N 4°32′E
- Country: Netherlands
- Province: North Holland

Government
  - Body: Municipal council
  - Mayor: David Moolenburgh (CDA)

Area
  - Total: 43.97 km^{2} (16.98 sq mi)
  - Land: 32.12 km^{2} (12.40 sq mi)
  - Water: 11.85 km^{2} (4.58 sq mi)
- Elevation: 3 m (9.8 ft)

Population (January 2021)
  - Total: 17,168
  - Density: 534/km^{2} (1,380/sq mi)
- Demonym: Zandvoorter
- Time zone: UTC+1 (CET)
  - Summer (DST): UTC+2 (CEST)
- Postcode: 2040–2042, 2116
- Area code: 023
- Website: www.zandvoort.nl

Zandvoort (Dutch pronunciation: [ˈzɑntfoːrt]) is a municipality in the province of North Holland, Netherlands. It is one of the major beach resorts of the Netherlands; it has a long sandy beach. It is bordered by coastal dunes of Zuid-Kennemerland National Park and the Amsterdam water supply dunes. It hosts the country's most prominent motor racing circuit, Circuit Zandvoort—the host of the Dutch Grand Prix from 1950 through 1985 and from 2021 to 2026.

The municipality extends inland to take in Bentveld; it had a population of 17,374 in 2025. A nudist bathing section of the beach with six eateries begins about 2 km (1¼ miles) to the south and extends kilometers further.

== History ==
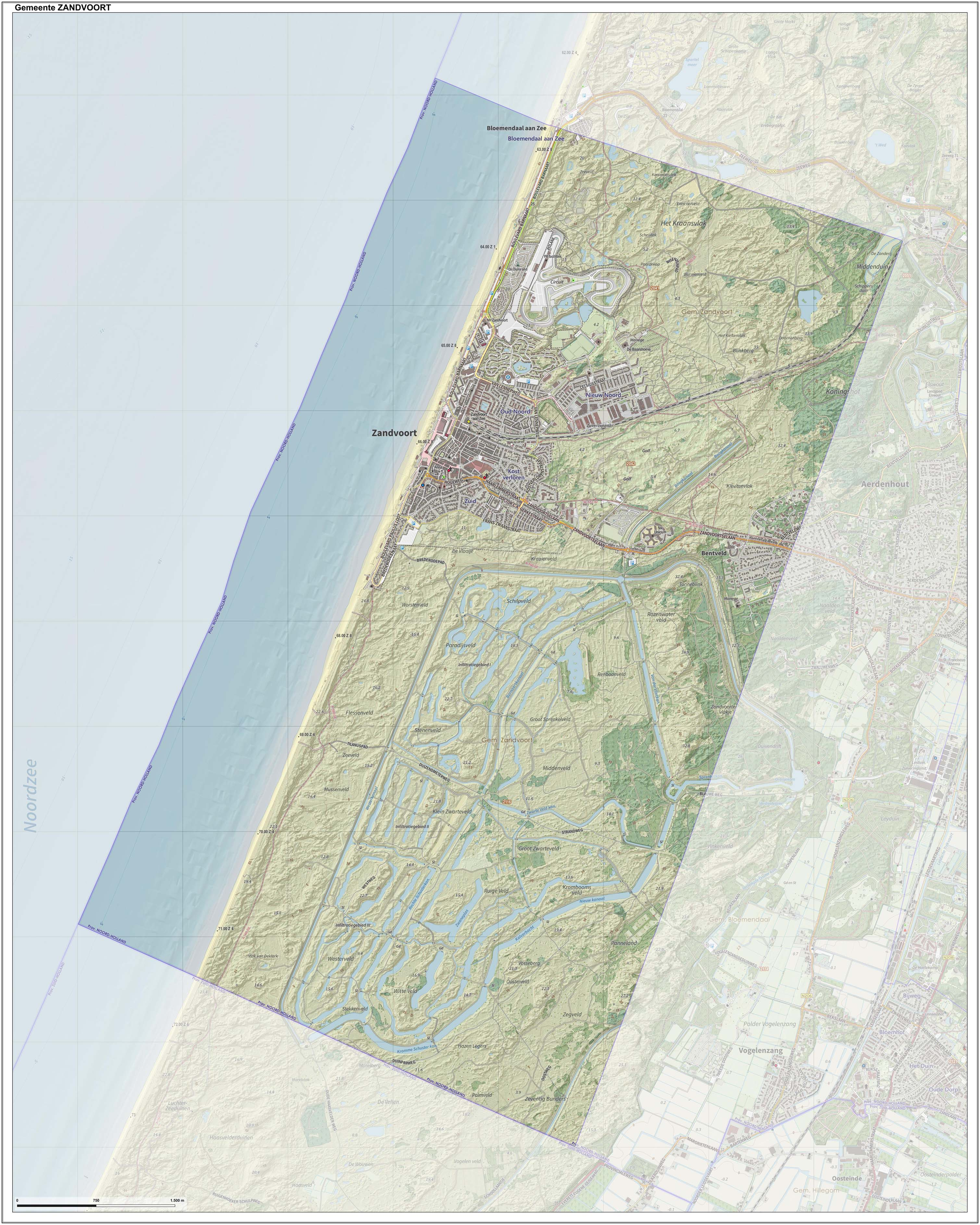
Map of Zandvoort, 2014

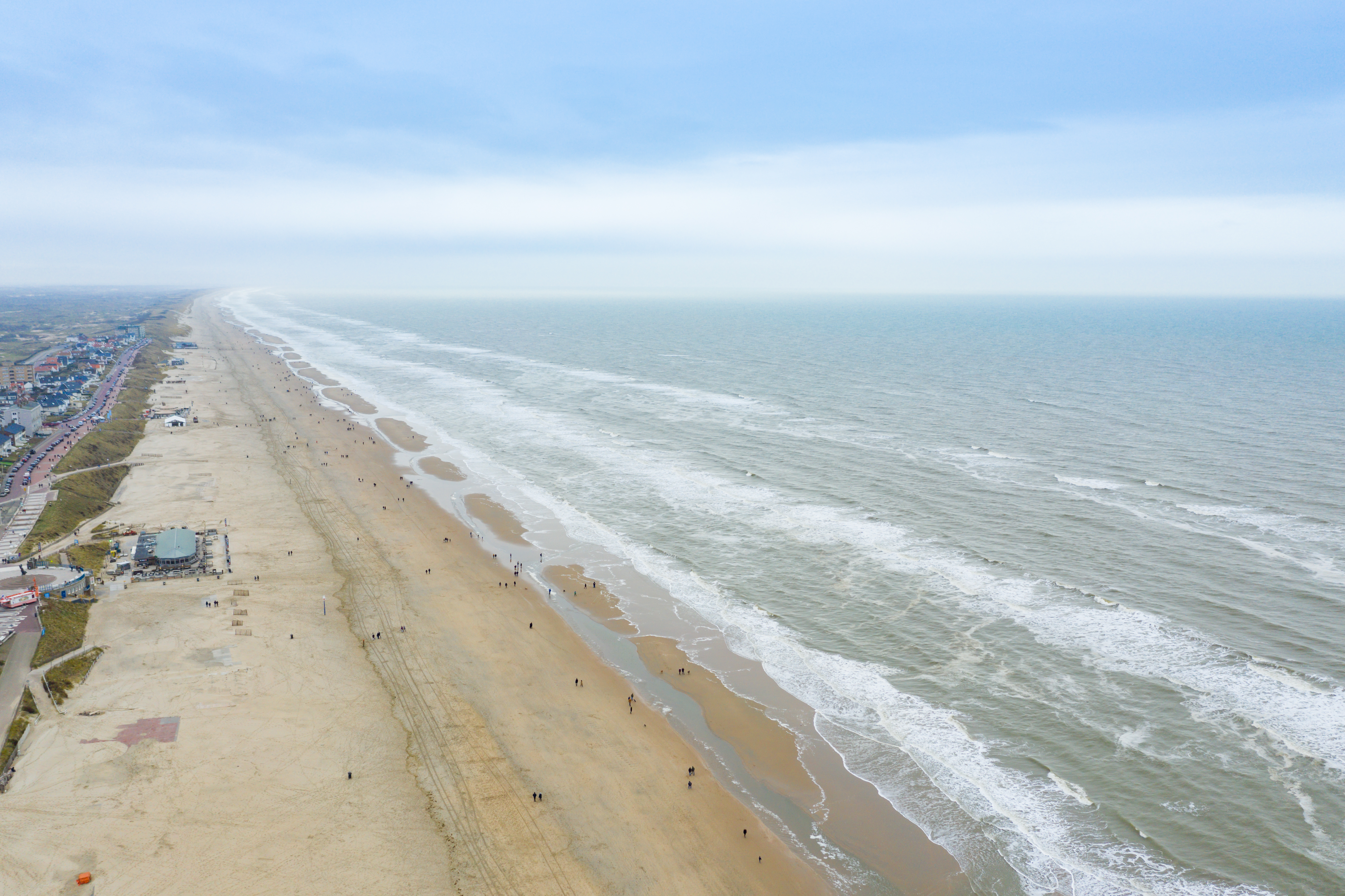
Zandvoort aan Zee

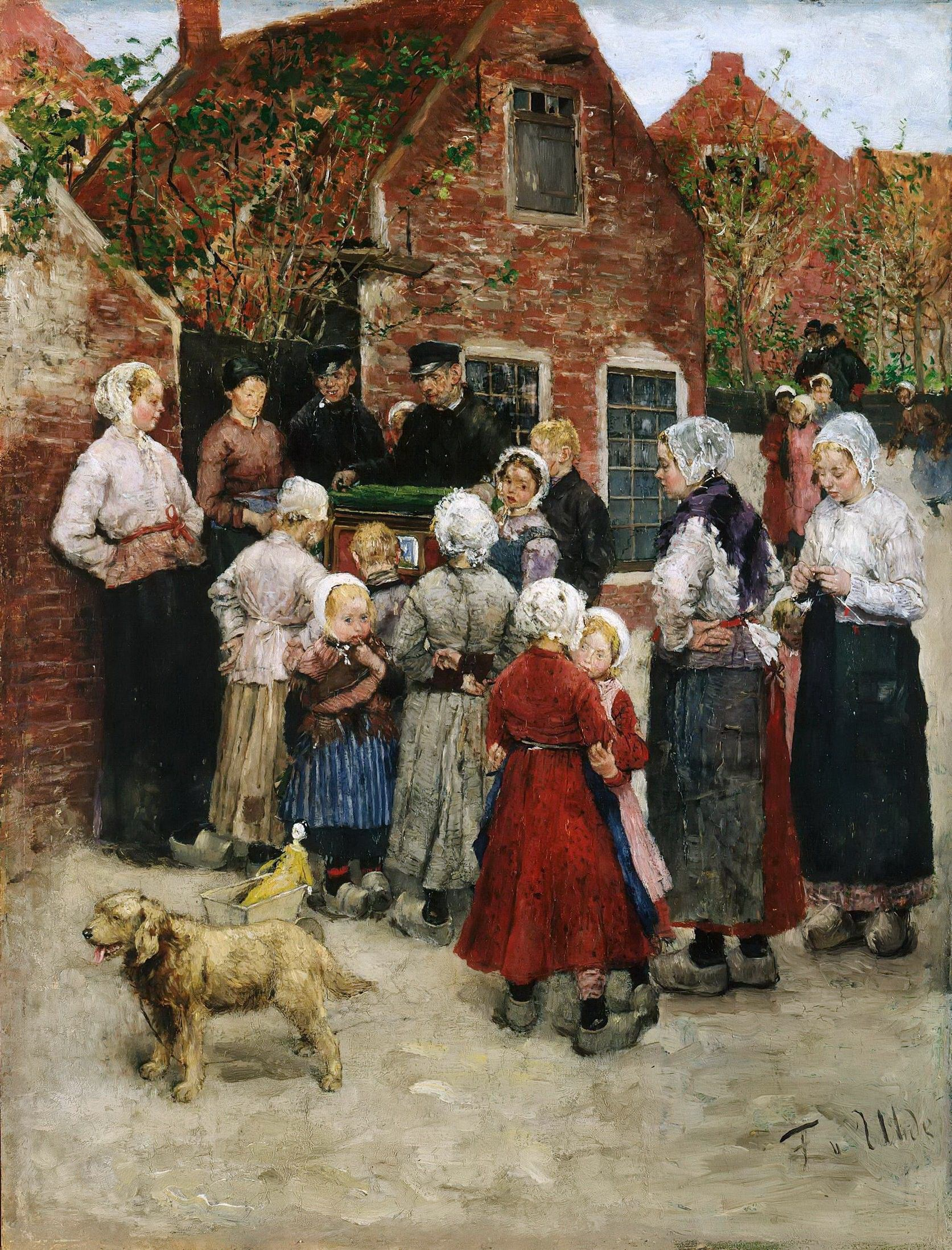
Organ Grinder in Zandvoort, 1883 painting by Fritz von Uhde. Click to expand.

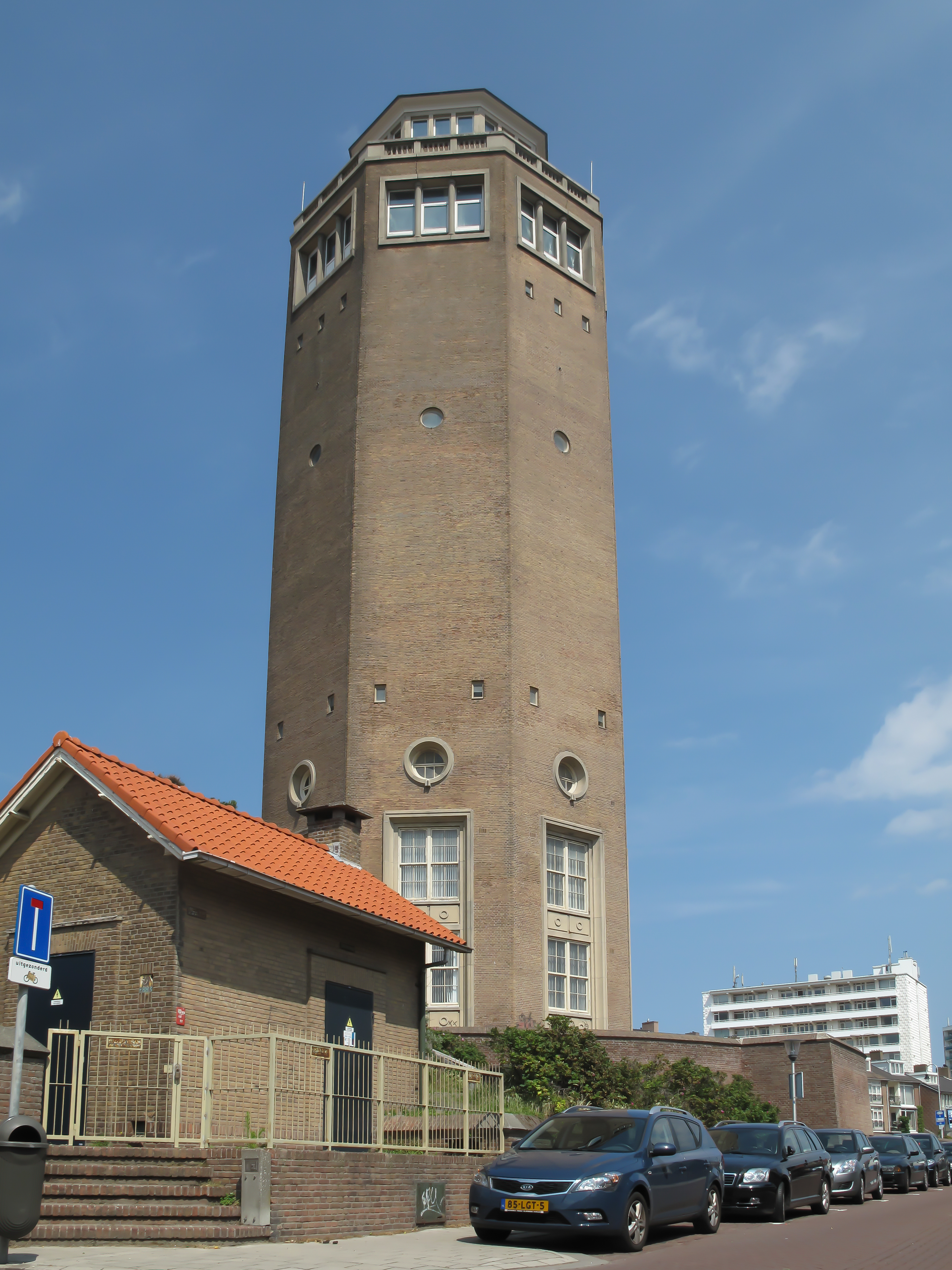
Zandvoort, water tower

Zandvoort is known to exist in 1100, called Sandevoerde (a combination of "sand" and "voorde", meaning ford; compare English Sandford). Until 1722 the area was under the control of the Lords of Brederode. The village was dependent on fishing for many centuries until the 19th century when it started to transform itself into a seaside resort, following the pattern set by similar towns in the United Kingdom. In 1828 the first resort was inaugurated. Thereafter many notable persons would visit Zandvoort, including Elisabeth of Bavaria in 1884 and 1885. In the middle of the same century, potato cultivation started in the dunes.

In 1881 the railway station near the coast opened, followed by tram connection to Haarlem in 1899, which greatly increased the beach tourism. In 1905 one of the earliest Dutch fictional films was shot in the town, De mésaventure van een Fransch heertje zonder pantalon aan het strand te Zandvoort.

Before the Second World War (in 1935), Zandvoort was known for having an unusually large number of National Socialist Movement (NSB) supporters. In the 1935 provincial elections, around 25% of local voters supported Anton Mussert's party, the highest share of votes the NSB received in any municipality in the Netherlands. Immediately after the German invasion in May 1940, an SS unit was stationed in Zandvoort. Combined with the town's relatively large number of NSB supporters, this led to a worsening situation for its Jewish residents. During the night of 4-5 August 1940, the synagogue was blown up. During World War II, Zandvoort was heavily damaged. On May 23, 1942, beach access was no longer permitted and several months later the town was almost completely vacated. Resorts and avenues were demolished to make way for the coastal fortifications of the Atlantic Wall.

After the war, the town's growth accelerated, matching the growth in tourism. In 1948, Circuit Zandvoort was built, hosting the Dutch Grand Prix for several decades, until 1985. The Dutch GP was scheduled to come back in 2020, but due to the COVID-19 pandemic, it was cancelled. It returned in 2021, in the 2021 Formula One World Championship and hosted the Dutch GP until 2026. Zandvoort continues to be a major Dutch resort location, where nearly half of all employment is related to tourism. The Dutch singer Willem Duyn's De Eerste Trein Naar Zandvoort ("First train to Zandvoort"), modeled on the American song Chattanooga Choo Choo and chronicling chaos and mayhem on the first seaside train, was a hit in the summer of 1983.

== Transport ==
Zandvoort has a station, with half-hourly services to Haarlem and Amsterdam, with extra services from Haarlem during the summer. The station is Zandvoort aan Zee railway station.

== Local government ==
The municipal council of Zandvoort consists of 17 seats, which are divided as follows since 2026:

- Ouderen Partij Zandvoort (OPZ): 3 seats
- Jong Zandvoort: 3 seats
- VVD: 3 seats
- PvdA/GroenLinks: 2 seats
- PVV: 2 seats
- CDA: 2 seats
- D66: 1 seat
- Zandvoort Echt Een (ZEE): 1 seat

== Notable people ==
- William Merritt Chase (1849–1916) American Impressionist Painter painted his masterpiece entitled "Sunlight and Shadow" in Zandvoort. It hangs in the Joslyn Art Museum in Omaha, Nebraska.
- Lovis Corinth (1858–1925) German artist and writer, painter and printmaker died of pneumonia in Zandvoort having made a final visit to see his favourite Dutch masters
- Bep Schrieke (1890–1945) politician and academic
- Lou Bandy (1890–1959) singer and conferencier
- Anne Frank (1929–1945) Jewish diarist and victim of the Holocaust, and her family used to regularly visit Zandvoort in the summer.
- Shirley Zwerus, stage name Shirley (born 1946) singer and pianist
- Hans Willem Blom (born 1947) Professor of Social and Political Philosophy at Erasmus University
- Stella Maessen (born 1953) singer, participated in the Eurovision Song Contests of 1970, 1977 and 1982

=== Sport ===
- Elisabeth Koning (1917–1975) sprinter, competed in the women's 100 metres at the 1936 Summer Olympics
- Bep Ipenburg (born 1936) former artistic gymnast, competed at the 1960 Summer Olympics
- Bert Jacobs (1941–1999) football manager and played for HFC Haarlem
- Roy Schuiten (1950–2006) track and road racing cyclist
- Loes Schutte (born 1953) retired rower, participated in 1976 Summer Olympics
- Jan Lammers (born 1956), former racing driver (Formula One)
- Piet Keur (born 1960), former football player
- Harriet van Ettekoven (born 1961) former international rower, won the bronze medal in the Women's Eights at the 1984 Summer Olympics
- Danny van Dongen (born 1983) racing driver and entrepreneur
- Leroy Kaestner (born 1988) welterweight kickboxer
- René Lammers (born 2008), racing driver
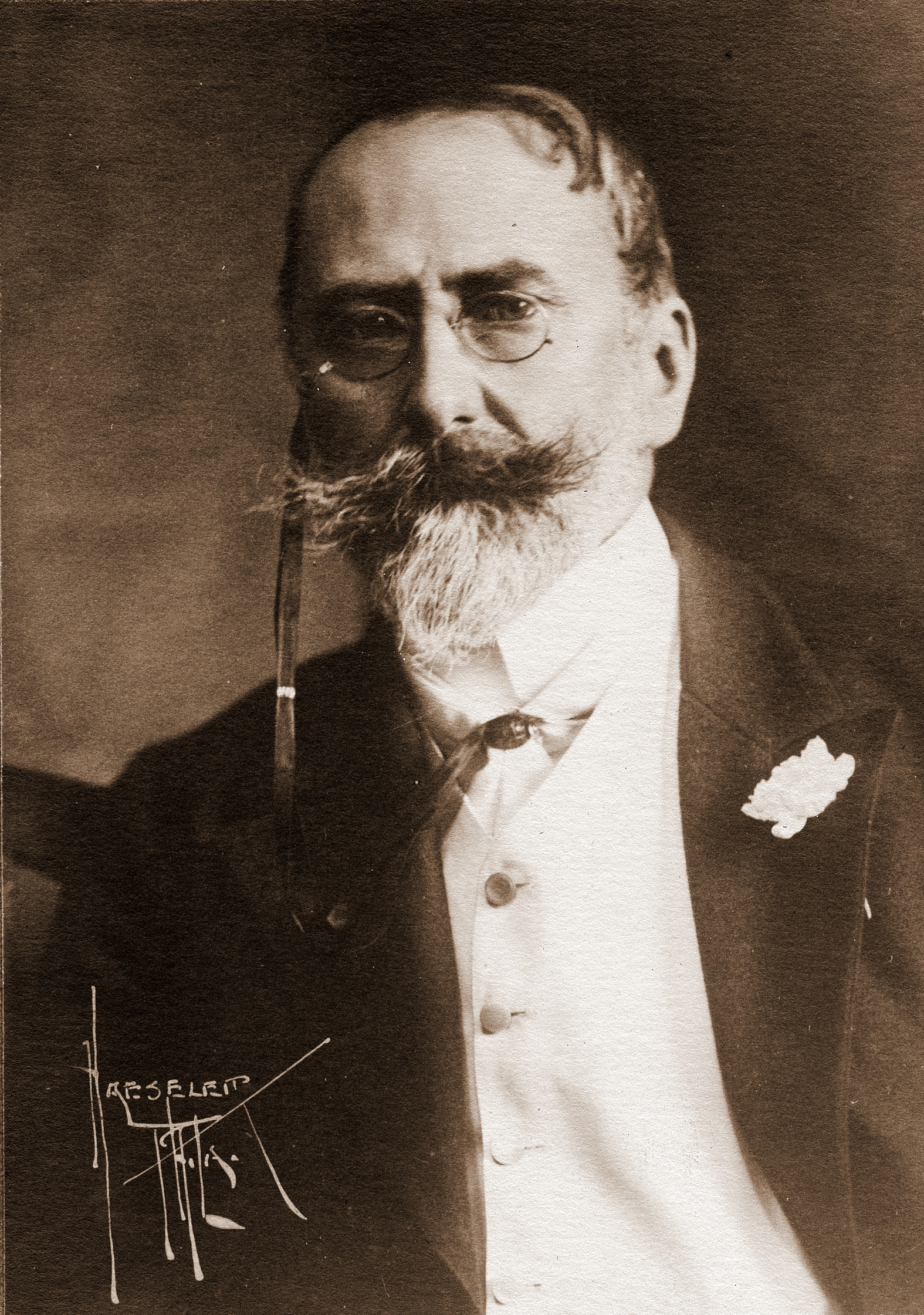
William Merritt Chase

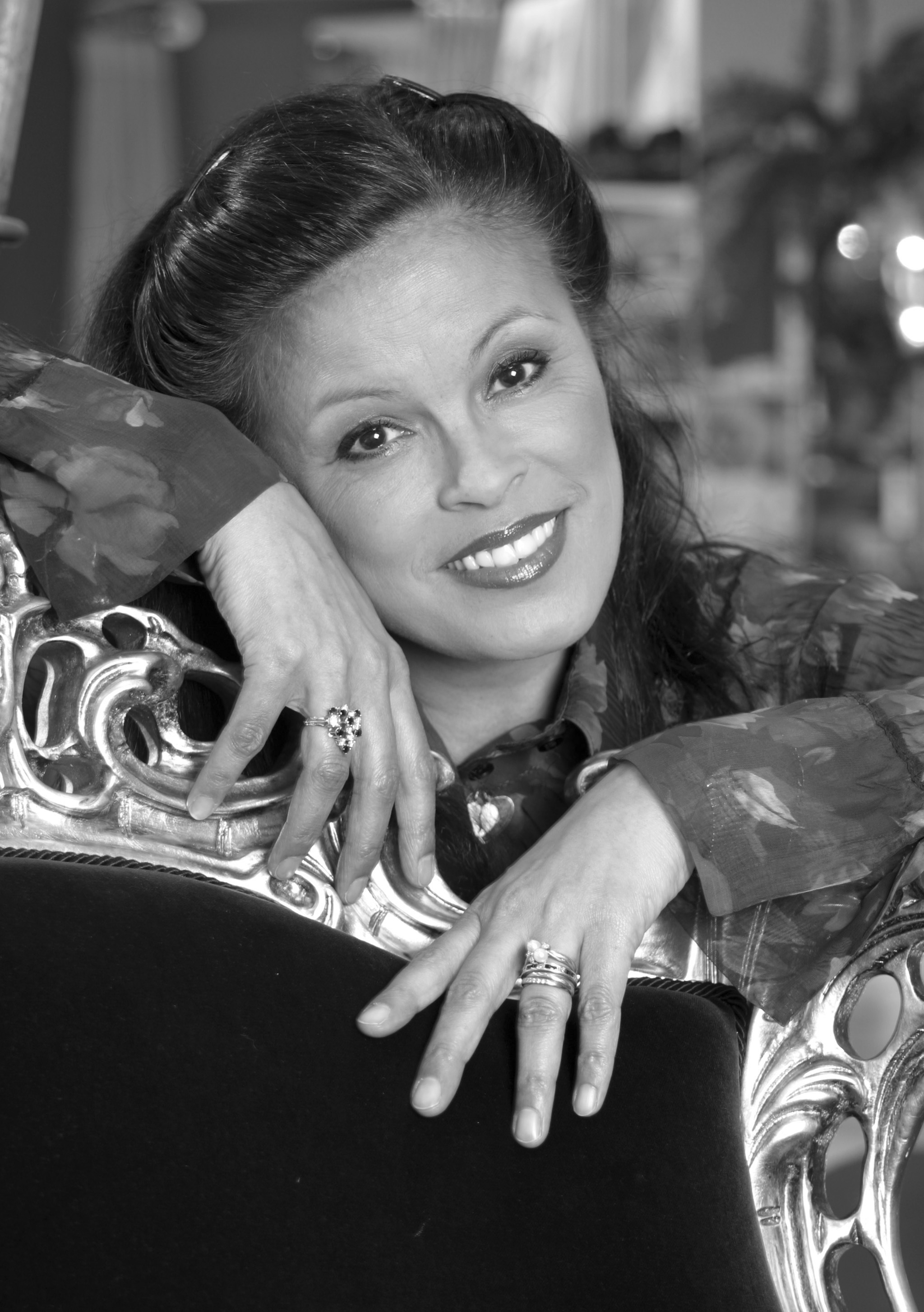
Stella Maessen
