= Lesley M. M. Blume =

American writer, journalist, and historian

Lesley M. M. Blume is an American journalist, historian, and author.

== Early life and education ==
Blume was born in New York City in 1975. She holds a B.A. in history from Williams College and earned her graduate degree in historical studies from Cambridge University, where she was a Herchel Smith scholar.

== Career ==
Blume began her career in television news, as a researcher for Cronkite Productions and then a researcher and off-air reporter for ABC News Nightline with Ted Koppel. Now writing full-time, her work has appeared in Vanity Fair, The New York Times, National Geographic, The Wall Street Journal, WSJ magazine, Columbia Journalism Review, Vogue, Town & Country, The Hollywood Reporter, Slate, The Los Angeles Review of Books and The Paris Review Daily, among other publications.

Blume often writes about historical nuclear events, historical war journalism, and the intersection of war and the arts. Her National Geographic feature on Trinity Test downwinders was recently featured at congressional hearings on the Radiation Exposure Compensation Act (RECA) and admitted into Congressional Record.

== Books ==
Blume is the author of, most recently, Fallout: The Hiroshima Cover-Up and the Reporter Who Revealed It to the World, about war correspondent John Hersey’s experience reporting the horrors of the atomic bombing of Hiroshima, which The New York Times recognized as one of the "100 Notable Books of 2020." Fallout won the 2021 Sperber Prize, and was also cited as a best book of 2020 by Vanity Fair, Publishers Weekly and other publications.

Her previous major non-fiction book, Everybody Behaves Badly: The True Story Behind Hemingway’s Masterpiece The Sun Also Rises was released in 2016 to coincide with the 90th anniversary of Sun's 1926 release. The book was a Washington Post notable book of 2016, an Amazon’s Editor’s Pick: Best Biographies and Memoirs, and became a New York Times best seller.

Blume’s early nonfiction books include Let's Bring Back (2010), Let's Bring Back: The Cocktail Edition (2012) and Let's Bring Back: The Lost Language Edition. (2013). She is also the author of It Happened Here (Thornwillow Press, 2011), a book detailing the raucous social history of New York City’s St. Regis Hotel. The book was the inaugural volume of Thornwillow’s Libretto series, which showcases the work of literary lions past and present, including Peter Matthiessen, Adam Gopnik and Lewis Lapham.

For young readers, Blume has authored four novels, all published by Knopf. Her debut children’s novel, Cornelia and the Audacious Escapades of the Somerset Sisters, has sold over 300,000 copies. Blume’s first collection of short stories for children, Modern Fairies, Dwarves, Goblins, and Other Nasties, was released in 2010; her second collection – The Wondrous Journals of Wendell Wellington Wiggins – debuted in 2012. Knopf released her most recent children’s novel – Julia and the Art of Practical Travel – in 2015.

== Works ==
- Everybody Behaves Badly, Houghton Mifflin Harcourt 2016. ISBN 9780544276000
- Fallout: The Hiroshima Cover-Up and the Reporter Who Revealed It to the World, Simon & Schuster, Incorporated, 2020. ISBN 9781982128517
- Let's Bring Back (2010), ISBN 9781452105307
- It Happened Here Thornwillow Press, 2011.
