= Kees Blom =

Dutch ecologist

Cornelis Wilhelmus Petrus Maria (Kees) Blom (born 1946) is a Dutch ecologist.

== Career ==
He was a professor at the Radboud University Nijmegen, where he also served as rector magnificus from 2000 to 2007. He took over the position from Theo van Els. When he himself handed the position over to Bas Kortmann he was the longest serving rector, with seven years, four months and twenty-one days.

Blom was elected a member of the Royal Netherlands Academy of Arts and Sciences in 1997.
