= Martin Blume Jr. Farm =

- U.S. National Register of Historic Places
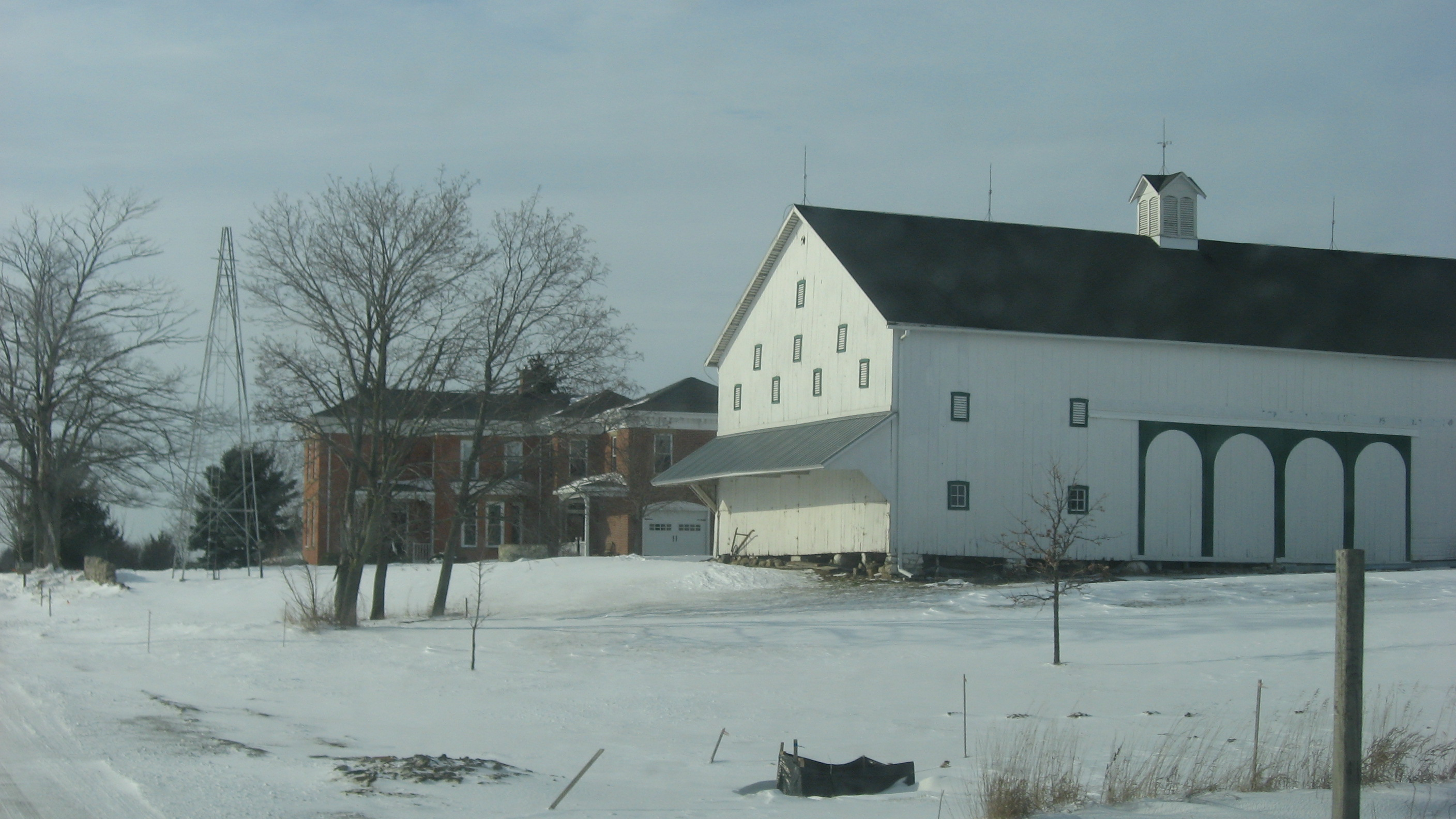
- Martin Blume Jr. Farm, January 2014

- Location within Indiana Location within the United States
- Location: 7311 Flutter Rd., St. Joseph Township, Allen County, Indiana
- Coordinates: 41°9′53″N 85°3′2″W
- Area: 2 acres (0.81 ha)
- Built: 1885
- Built by: White, E.H.
- Architectural style: Italianate, English Barn
- NRHP reference No.: 06000847
- Added to NRHP: September 20, 2006

Martin Blume Jr. Farm is a historic home and farm located in St. Joseph Township, Allen County, Indiana. The farmhouse was built in 1885, and is a two-story, Italianate style brick dwelling with a low hipped roof. Also on the property are the contributing large three bay timber frame threshing barn (c. 1883), timber frame hog barn (c. 1889), storage barn (c. 1899), brooder house, windmill frame, brick smokehouse, and privy.

Martin Blume Jr. was a second-generation German American who assisted his father (Martin Blume Sr.) and brothers in preparing the surrounding land for cultivation. Blume Jr. purchased the property from his father and lived there with his wife, Cecilia. After Martin Blume Jr. died in 1939, Homer Blume (his son) inherited the property and continued to farm the land.

It was listed on the National Register of Historic Places in 2006.
