= Bloom (music venue) =

Discotheque in Italy

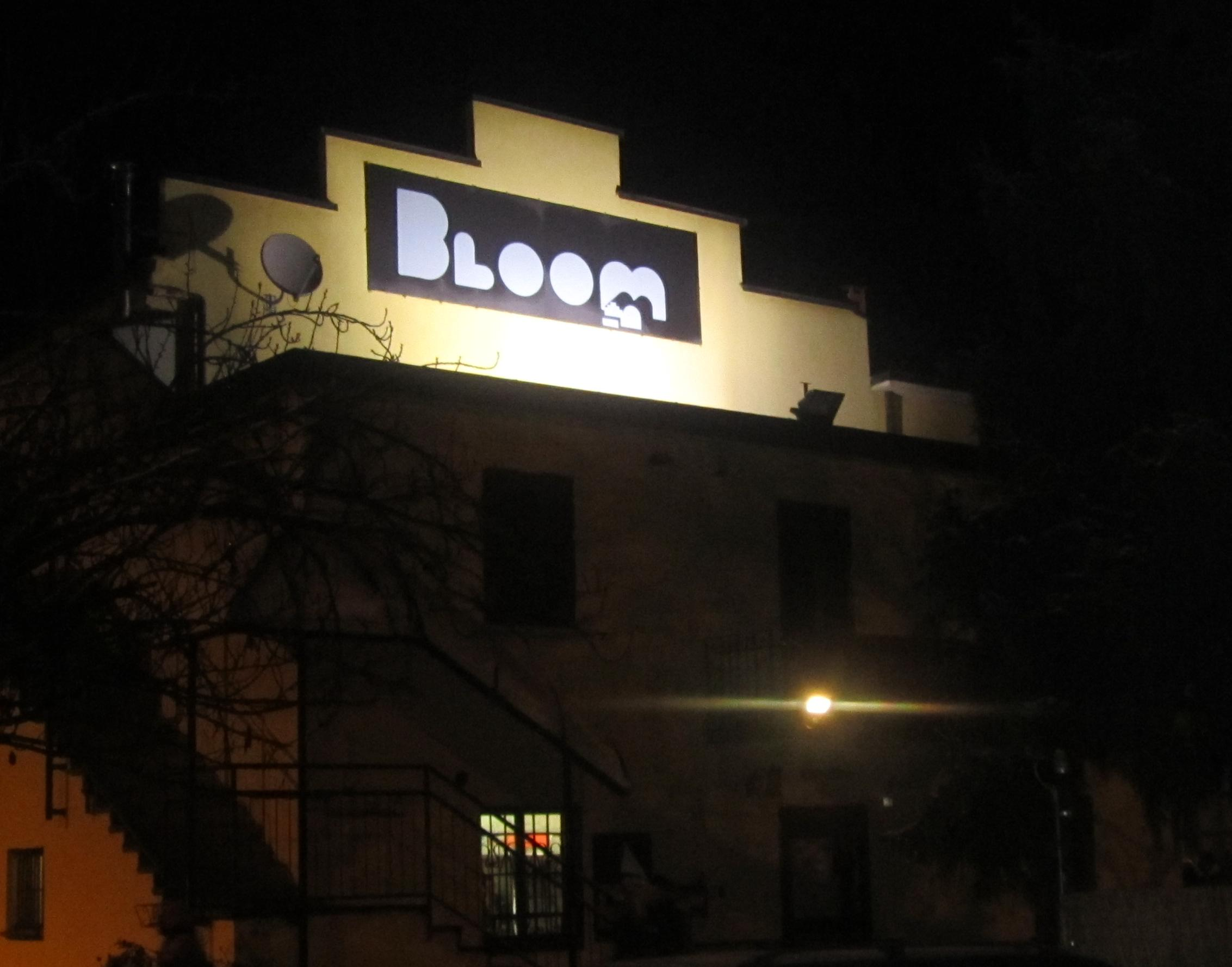
- External view
- Interactive map of Bloom
- Address: Via Eugenio Curiel, 39; Mezzago; Italy
- Coordinates: 45.631025°N 9.442088°E
- Owner: Cooperative "Il Visconte di Mezzago"
- Event: Alternative rock

Construction
- Opened: 1987

Website
- http://www.bloomnet.org

Bloom is an alternative music club founded on 16 May 1987 in Mezzago in Brianza and still active, which hosts mainly live concerts, but also film screenings arthouse either outdoors or in the dedicated room, music competitions, courses, exhibitions of art and photography.

It is run by the Social Cooperative "Il Visconte di Mezzago" aiming to "concretely demonstrate that it is possible to live in this society without surrendering neither to the logic of consumerism and corporations, nor to cultural atrophy." The Bloom has always led a constant, and varied music programming at a rate of more than 100 concerts a year and theme days and is still a reference point for Lombard music lovers.

== Some past concerts ==
- A Wilhelm Scream 26 April 2022
- Afterhours
- Against Me! 11 November 2011
- Amparanoia 28 November 2009
- Architecture in Helsinki 16 October 2011
- Area
- Banco del Mutuo Soccorso
- Brutal Truth 29 January 1993
- Buddy Miles
- Buzzcocks
- Carcass 13 April 1992
- Cult of Luna 23 April 2013
- Diaframma
- Dinosaur Jr.15 February 2013
- Easy Star All-Stars 22 October 2011
- Fairport Convention
- Fuzztones 3 May 2007
- Giardini di Mirò
- Goblin
- Green Day 17 May 1994
- Gun Club
- Hole
- Il Teatro degli Orrori
- Isis
- June of 44
- Kyuss 16 September 1994
- Lacuna Coil 21 October 2011
- Massimo Volume
- Modena City Ramblers
- Melvins 6 October 2011 - 1 May 2013
- Mercury Rev
- Mono 17 February 2013
- Motorpsycho 24 September 1993 - 28 May 1994 - 19 March 1995 - 18 April 1996 - 24 May 1997 - 14 May 1998 - 30 April 1999 - 25 April 2012 - 7 maggio 2013
- Nada Surf 23 March 2012
- Napalm Death
- Nirvana 26 November 1989 - 17 novembre 1991
- Oneida
- Pentangle
- Primal Scream
- Primus
- Queens of the Stone Age
- Samiam 27 October 2010
- Screaming Trees 10 March 1990
- Sepultura 23 May 2003
- Sick of It All 19 October 2011
- Shellac 22 May 2011
- Spin Doctors 29 December 2012
- Subsonica
- Swans
- The Datsuns 9 February 2013
- The Skatalites 19 May 2010
- The Toasters
- Tonino Carotone
- Tre Allegri Ragazzi Morti
- Ulan Bator
- Verdena
- Vinicio Capossela 9 December 2012
- Wire 22 April 2011
- Zebrahead 18 April 2010
- ZU
