= Bloom Creek (Madden Creek tributary) =

Stream in the American state of Missouri

Coordinates: 37.7806085°N 90.1540061°W

Bloom Creek is a stream in Ste. Genevieve County in the U.S. state of Missouri. It is a tributary of Madden Creek.

Bloom Creek derives its name from the local Blume family.

== See also ==
- List of rivers of Missouri
