= Irma Blohm =

German politician (1909–1997)

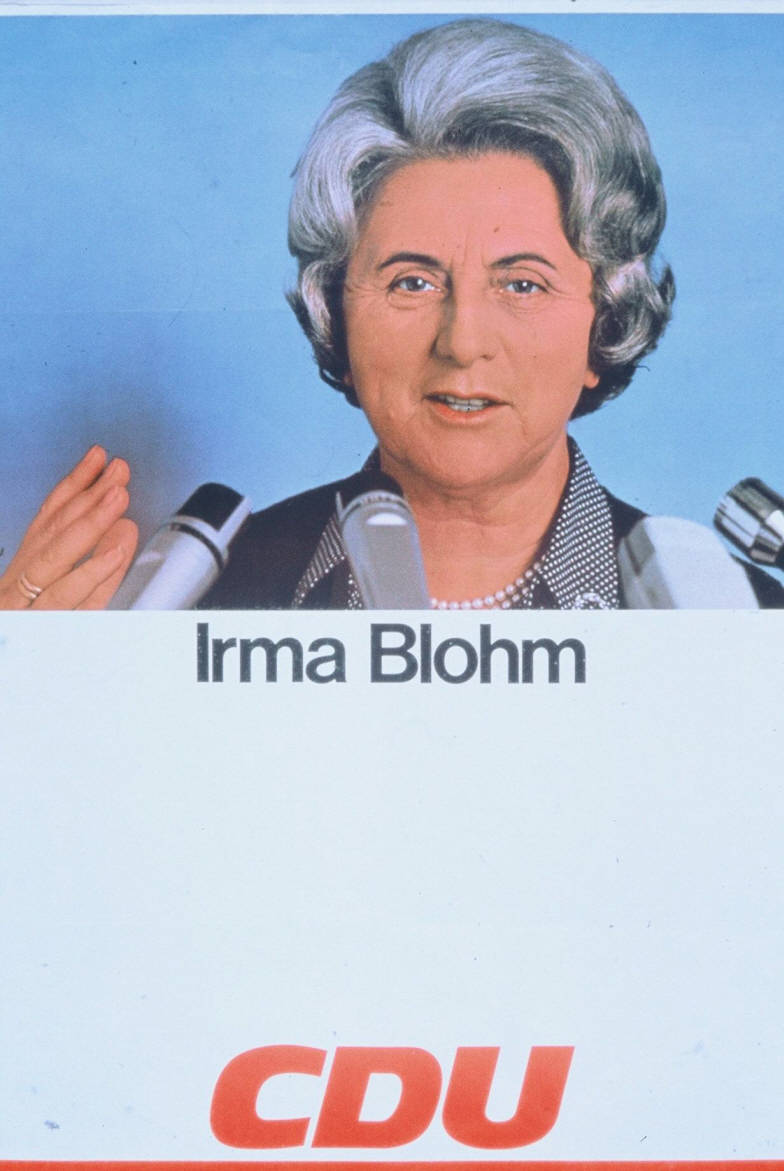
- Personal poster Irma Blohms for the 1972 federal elections

Member of the Bundestag
- In office 15 October 1957 – 19 October 1969

Personal details
- Born: 24 November 1909 Hamburg, German Empire
- Died: 29 January 1997 (aged 85) Hamburg, Germany
- Party: CDU

Irma Blohm (24 November 1909 – 1 January 1997) was a German politician of the Christian Democratic Union (CDU) and former member of the German Bundestag.

== Life ==
Irma Blohm had been a member of the CDU since 1949, she had been deputy chairwoman of the CDU regional women's committee since 1957 and chairwoman of the same committee since 1970. In 1973 she became deputy chairwoman of the CDU's Federal Women's Association. From 1969 onwards, she was deputy federal chairwoman of the CDU's Federal Expert Committee on Health Policy. In 1953 she was elected to the Hamburg Parliament (until 1957). In 1955, she was sent to the deputation of the social welfare authority.

From 1957 to 1969 Irma Blohm was a member of the German Bundestag. From 15 October 1968 to 1969 she was deputy chairperson of the CDU/CSU parliamentary group.

== Literature ==
Herbst, Ludolf; Jahn, Bruno (2002). Vierhaus, Rudolf (ed.). Biographisches Handbuch der Mitglieder des Deutschen Bundestages. 1949–2002 [Biographical Handbook of the Members of the German Bundestag. 1949–2002] (in German). München: De Gruyter - De Gruyter Saur. p. 1715. ISBN 978-3-11-184511-1.
