= Blome =

Blome is a surname. Notable people with the surname include:

- Fanny Blomé (born 1990), Swedish model
- Gert Blomé (1934–2021), Swedish ice hockey player
- Heinz-Jürgen Blome (1946–2012) German football player
- Kurt Blome (1894–1969), German scientist
- Nikolaus Blome (born 1963), German journalist
- Richard Blome (1635–1705), British publisher and cartographer
