= Blum (podcast) =

Fiction podcast by El Extraordinario

Blum (stylized as blum.) is a fiction podcast written and directed by Manuel Bartual and Carmen Pacheco and produced by El Extraordinario. The story follows a journalist investigating the disappearance of an art history student who was studying the fictional painter Ursula Blum.

== Background ==
Blum is a fiction podcast written and directed by Manuel Bartual and Carmen Pacheco and produced by El Extraordinario. The podcast is composed of nine 20-minute episodes, and in each episode the characters travel by train to visit a different city in Switzerland such as Basel, Geneva, and Lucerne. Throughout the show, the characters visit 10 different art museums. The show stars Jacinto Bobo, Nicky García, and Vicky Porque.

The story follows the journalist Emma Castillo who is investigating the disappearance of an art history student named Clara Pastor who in turn was studying the painter Ursula Blum. The podcast was later adapted into English and the protagonists names were changed from Emma Castillo and Clara Pastor to Emma Clark and Clara Torres respectively.

== Reception ==
Miranda Sawyer commented on the show in The Guardian, noting that the "start is a little slow, and occasionally the acting somewhat stilted, but the story gets more absorbing as the tension increases". The show was nominates in three categories at the 2023 Ondas Awards and won best Branded Podcast.
