= Robert Blum =

German democratic politician (1807–1848)

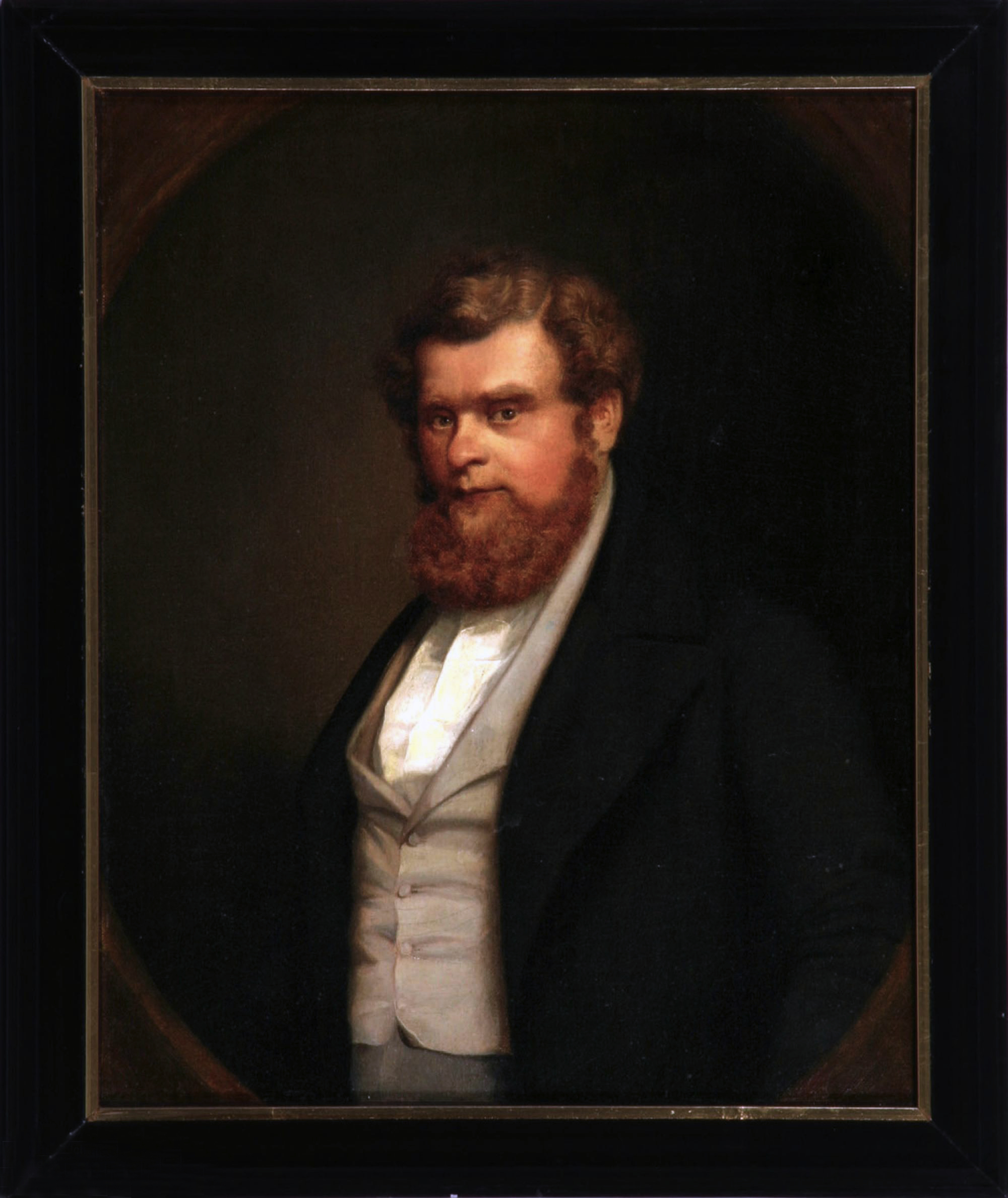
- Portrait by August Hunger, 1845–1848

Personal details
- Born: 10 November 1807 Cologne, France
- Died: 9 November 1848 (aged 40) Brigittenau, Vienna, Austria
- Resting place: Jewish cemetery in Währing
- Citizenship: Prussian
- Spouse: Jenny Blum (m. 1840)
- Children: 4, including Hans Blum
- Parents: Engelbert Blum (father); Maria Katharina Brabender (mother)
- Occupation: Librarian, Politician, Writer, Revolutionary

Robert Blum (10 November 1807 – 9 November 1848) was a German democratic politician, publicist, poet, publisher, revolutionary and member of the National Assembly of 1848. In his fight for a strong, unified Germany he opposed ethnocentrism and it was his strong belief that no one people should rule over another. As such he was an opponent of the Prussian occupation of Poland and was in contact with the revolutionaries there. Blum was a critic of antisemitism, supported the German Catholic sect, and agitated for the equality of the sexes. Although claiming immunity as a member of the National Assembly, he was arrested during a stay at the hotel "Stadt London" in Vienna and executed for his role in the Revolutions of 1848 in the German states.

== Biography ==
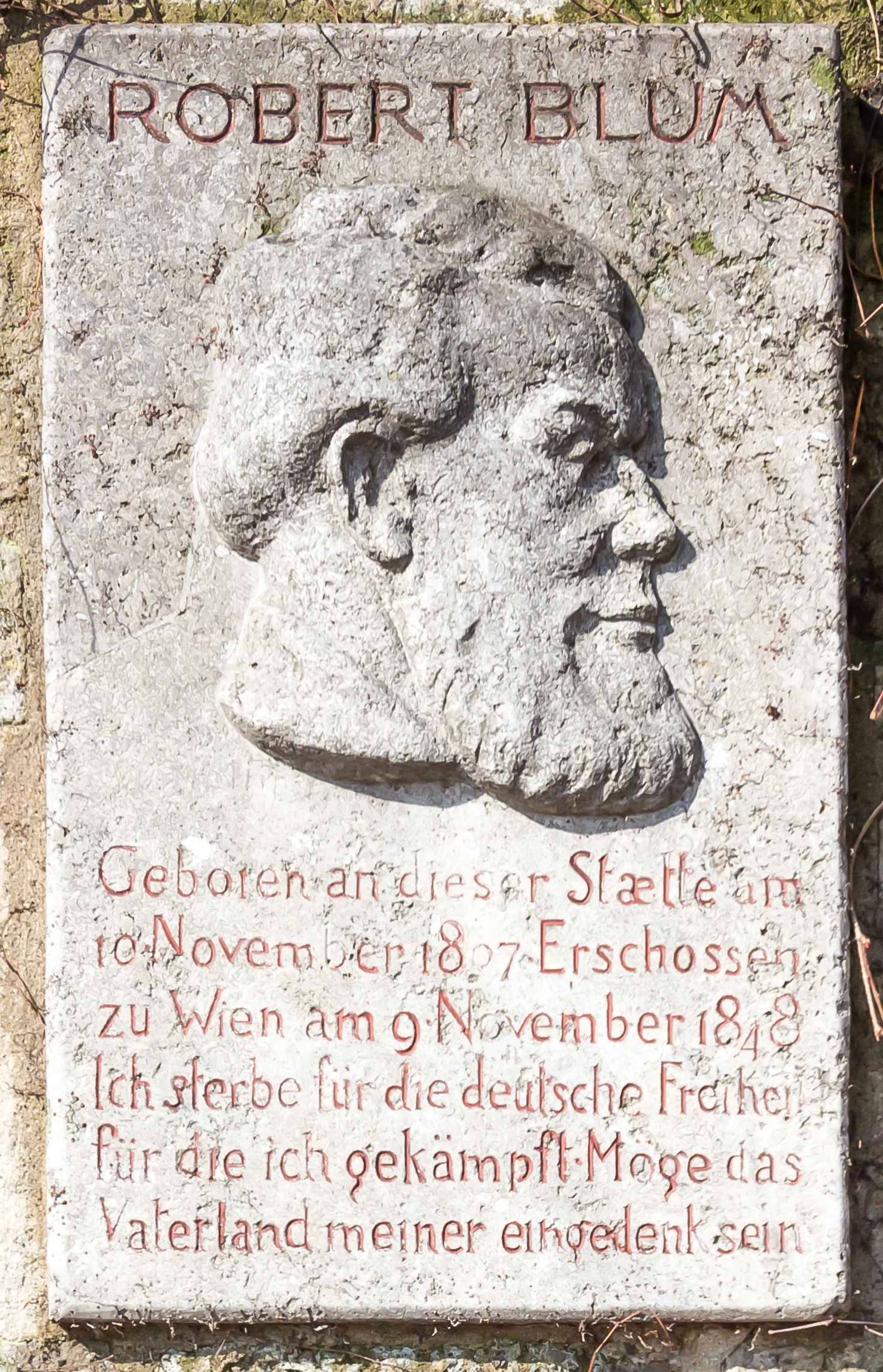
Memorial tablet at "Fischmarkt" in Cologne where Robert Blum was born Inscript: "Born at this place on 10 November 1807, shot at Vienna on 9 November 1848; I die for the German liberty that I fought for. May the fatherland remember me."

Robert Blum was born on 10 November 1807 in Fischmarkt No. 1490, which was a historic city fish market in the city of Cologne, which was at the time of his birth part of the First French Empire following the Treaty of Lunéville in 1801. Robert was the son of Engelbert Blum and Katharina Brabender. Engelbert had originally wanted to study theology but could not support himself and instead went into the profession of being a cooper but did not earn much. However, the profession ruined his health, and he was soon forced to work odd jobs, finally settling on working at a pin factory. Robert's mother, Katharina, was from the countryside and worked as a housemaid and on the side did some sewing and handiwork.

The Blum family thus grew up in extreme poverty in Cologne. Later, Robert would have two other siblings who were born: Johannes and Gretchen. By the age of three, Robert contracted a case of measles that was very bad, and so he was left for dead. He, however, did live, but it badly injured his eyes and he became blind for nine months afterwards. Dr. Bracht intervened and saved his eyesight, but his eyes would remain very weak for the rest of his life.

He was ten years old before he could go to school. After his schooling, he worked as a craftsman in different trades. He failed as a goldsmith's apprentice, but completed an apprenticeship as a gardener. After his journeyman's time, he returned to Cologne to work in a lamp factory. His employer put him to work at the counter since he was good at calculations. In 1829, he followed his employer to Berlin where he also continued his education. His work was interrupted by obligatory military service, and on his release, his poor circumstances obliged him to return to Cologne. There, in 1830, he worked serving in a theater company and started writing politically motivated poetry and plays. When the theater closed in the summer, he worked for a sheriff as a scribe.

The political upheavals of 1830 attracted his interest, and ideals of freedom found their way into his poetry. In 1832, he followed the theater troupe to Leipzig. There he came in touch with humanist and liberal circles, contributed to the liberal newspaper Zeitung für die elegante Welt and joined Leipzig's freemason lodge. By 1840, he had worked his way up to being a cashier in the city theater. That year he also founded the Schillerverein in Leipzig which celebrated the poet's anniversary as a festival in honor of political liberty.

Beginning in 1839, Blum became a leading figure in the Kingdom of Saxony's national-liberal circles; as a gifted orator and organizer, he helped establish Saxony's opposition movement as a serious political force. His initial attempt at a newsletter was suppressed by the censor, but another one continued for four years with occasional lapses due to the censor. He became a German Catholic when Johannes Ronge came to Leipzig, and wrote on that movement's behalf. In 1845, Blum organized the first German Catholic synod in Leipzig that marked the beginning of Germany's humanist free religious movement. In 1844, he gave up his theater job to found a book store.

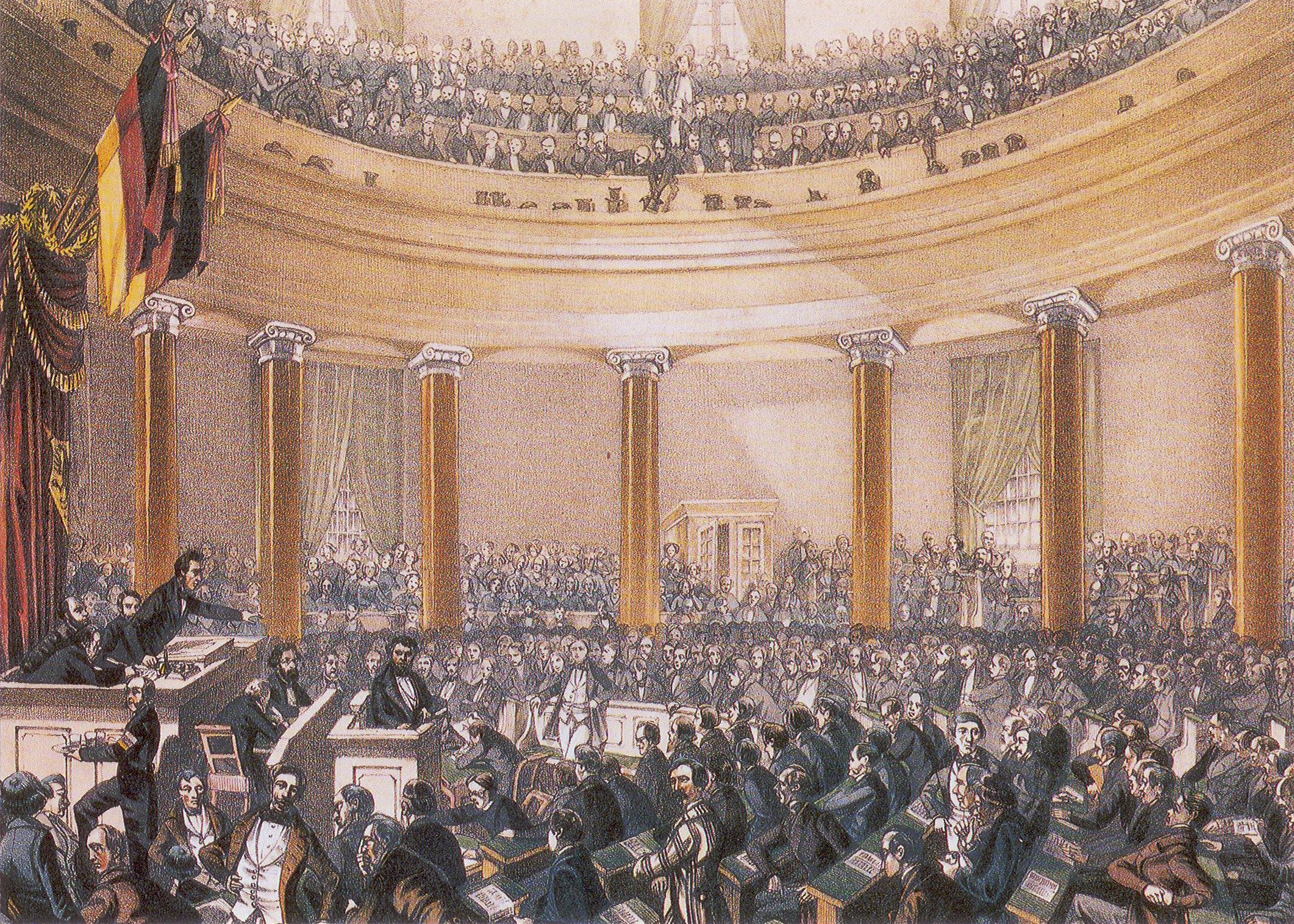
Painting by Ludwig von Elliott of the Frankfurt Parliament during a speech by Robert Blum, 1848

In 1845, the presence of John of Saxony stirred the masses and the military fired on them. At a turbulent meeting of armed citizens and students of Leipzig, Blum dissuaded them from storming the barracks, and urged conformity to the law. This resulted in his being elected a representative in Leipzig's government.

Blum embraced the upheavals of 1848. He was one of the presidents of the preliminary parliament at Frankfurt which he dominated with his energy, imposing figure and pithy speeches. As a member of the succeeding parliament and leader of the left, he worked to contain the most radical elements. Blum's trustworthiness was questioned when the extreme leftist Arnold Ruge claimed Blum had moved toward his side. As the leader of the radical liberal faction, he strongly opposed the Malmö Treaty between Denmark and Prussia that abolished Schleswig-Holstein's democratically elected government. He was also one of the most vocal supporters of popular sovereignty.

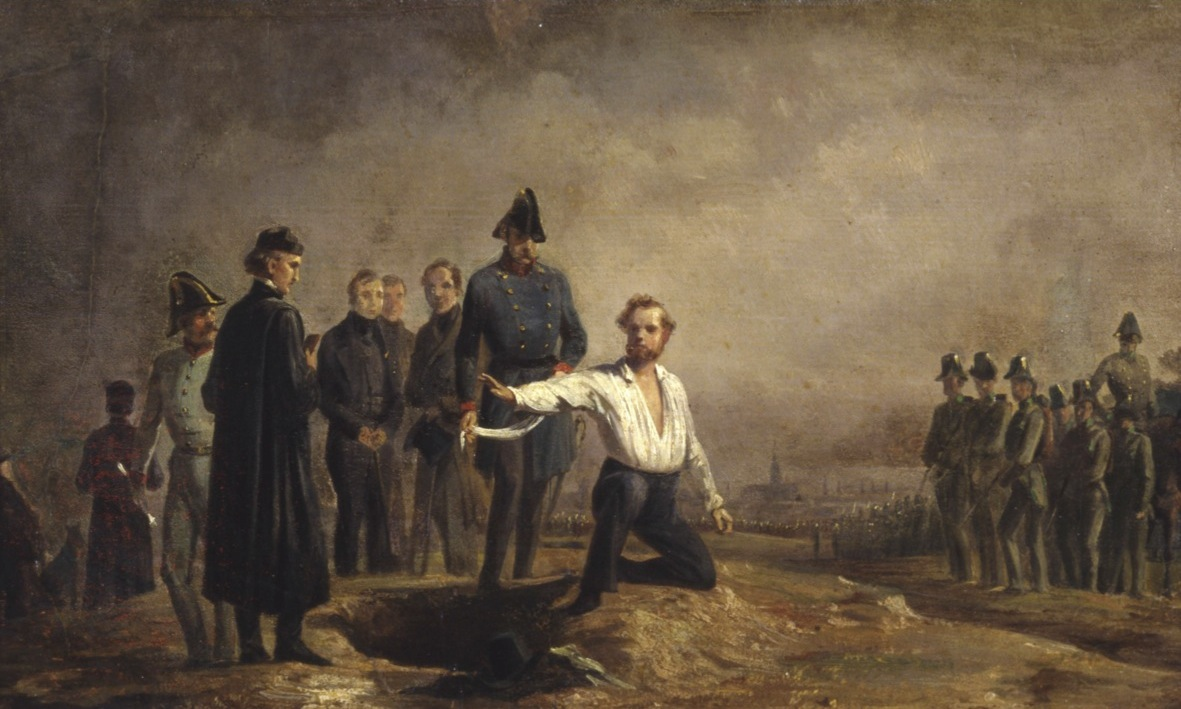
Painting by Carl Steffeck of the execution of Robert Blum, 1848

In October, when revolutionary fighting broke out in Vienna, Blum travelled there as part of a parliamentarian envoy and joined the revolutionary forces. On the surrender of the capital to Windischgrätz, Blum was arrested with several of his companions on 4 November. Brought before a military tribunal, he pleaded in vain his privileges as a deputy from the German Diet and was condemned to be hanged, a sentence which was changed to death by the bullet. He was executed on 9 November. His death became a symbol for the futility of Germany's 1848 rebellion; the day of his death marks the first of a series of events that led to November 9 being referred to as Germany's Schicksalstag (fateful day).

His son Hans Blum was a noted writer and journalist.
