= Laura Betterly =

American businesswoman (born 1961)

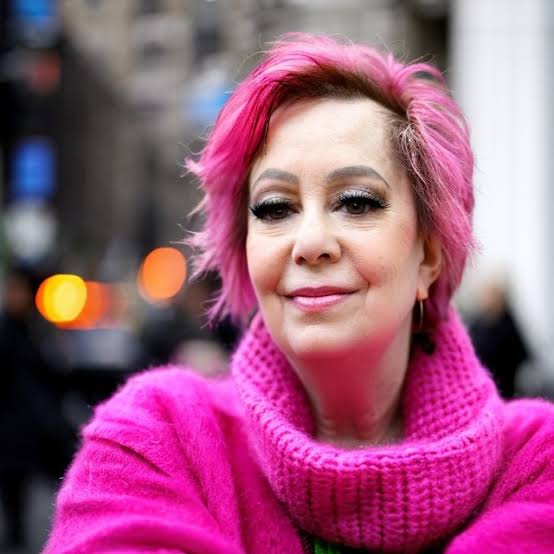
- Betterly in 2024
- Born: 1961 (age 64–65); Long Island, New York
- Citizenship: American
- Education: High School
- Occupation: Entrepreneur
- Known for: Front page of the Wall Street Journal for sending large quanties of commercial email.
- Website: laurabetterly.com

Laura Betterly, also known as Laura Betterly-Blom, is an American entrepreneur and the head of Data Resource Consulting, became notorious for sending large quantities of commercial e-mail in the early 21st century when she cracked as a joke, "call me the Spam Queen" to a Wall Street Journal reporter.

== Personal life ==
Betterly was born in Long Island, New York and lived there until 1995. She is now a resident of Clearwater, Florida. She has been married to Steven Blom, an officer in her corporation, since 2002. She has two children from her first marriage, Chris and Craig.

== Career ==
Before starting Data Resource Consulting, she was president and co-founder of Visiosonic, later known as PCDJ.COM, an mp3 music company. She worked with celebrities such as Ice T, Nile Rodgers, Jam Master Jay and Chaka Khan. She has been a featured speaker at the Consumer Electronics Show and the Winter Music Conference.

== Bulk mail or spam ==
At Data Resource Consulting, on a typical day, her firm would send out 8-10 million emails daily, charging clients $600–$1,000 per million emails and about half that amount for a sending a second time. She also charged clients for lead responses to emails. Unlike other mailers, Betterly said she did not forge headers, route messages through outside servers without permission, or use any of the other tricks that have drawn criticism of the spamming community. She also refused to send messages advertising adult products or services, or anything she believed to be illegal. She said that she only possessed the addresses of people who had expressed a desire to know more when signing up to other online services, and that she would honor any requests from recipients to unsubscribe from further mail.

Estimates indicate she may have earned at least US$200,000 per year. She said that she was "just trying to make a living like everyone else." Betterly publicly attacked those who were critical of her practices, "I have a beef against what I consider hate groups that are trying to shut down commercial e-mail" and referred to what she did as "a win-win situation". To those who objected to what she did for a living she said, "I don't really care. As long as I'm not breaking any laws, you don't have to love me or like what I do for a living."

Data Resource Consulting lost a legal case in Kansas small claims court on 9 September 2003 for failing to follow the spam laws in that state.

== Change of business model ==
In September 2005, Betterly and the chairman of her corporation, Bob Cefail, "fired" their radio station in Clearwater, Florida where her program,"The Profit Doctors" aired, because the station management discontinued the toll-free call-in number for their listeners. The following year, the pair "rehired" the same radio station to air a new program called Scooopradio.

Betterly took her company (In Touch Media Group) public and announced her retirement from the bulk commercial e-mail business on 10 October 2005, referring to spam as "a four-letter word" and stating that bulk emailing had deteriorated into "a bunch of unprofessional, ineffective scams" due to its negative image. She also attempted to distance herself from pro-spam statements that she made in earlier media interviews,"I have never advocated spam or sending spam."

Making a distinction between spam and commercial targeted email. They also were among the first companies to be certified by Google for pay per click.

In Touch Media lost over $2 million. Their 8-K filing with the SEC reveals they received another $1 million in funding for expansion. Despite the investment, In Touch closed its doors in 2007.

== Recent activity ==
Since 2007 Betterly has been running Yada Yada Marketing a boutique marketing firm, while maintaining a presence as a speaker and continues to speak at industry events.

She has established herself as a digital marketing space through her published courses, including Mobile Local Fusion, Local Agency Startup, and Traffic Genesis.

Adding to her entrepreneurial achievements, Betterly founded and sold CLOSEM.AI, a software company. In recent years, she has expanded her focus to include AI for business, providing training and consulting services over the last two years. This led to the launch of her newest venture, Yada Yada AI.
