= Bloom's Lake =

Lake in the state of Minnesota, United States

- Location within Minnesota
- Location: Chisago County, Minnesota
- Coordinates: 45°21′58″N 92°46′3″W
- Type: lake

Bloom's Lake is a lake in Chisago County, Minnesota. Bloom's Lake was named for Gustaf Bloom, an early Swedish settler.

== See also ==
- List of lakes in Minnesota
