= Bluma Tischler =

Polish-born Canadian pediatrician and researcher

- Born: June 20, 1924; Baranavichy, Second Polish Republic
- Died: 16 May 2015 (aged 90); Vancouver
- Occupation: Pediatrician
- Known for: Her work in treating phenylketonuria

Bluma Gorfinkel Tischler (June 20, 1924, in Baranavichy – May 16, 2015 in Vancouver) was a Canadian pediatrician known for her work in treating phenylketonuria, including her role in the widespread implementation of the Guthrie test for detecting that illness.

== Early life ==
Tischler — a teenager at the onset of the Second World War — fled into the Soviet Union from the German invasion of Poland, and ended up in Stalinabad, where she attended medical school and met her eventual husband, Isaak Tischler.

After the war, she and Isaak continued studying medicine in Wrocław, but left Poland in the wake of the Kielce Pogrom, pursuing their internships first in Munich, then in Montreal.

== Awards ==
In 1978, Tischler received the annual research award from the American Association of Mental Deficiency. She also received the Queen Elizabeth II Silver Jubilee Medal in 1977, and was named an emeritus professor of pediatric medicine at the University of British Columbia.

== Controversy ==
In 1954, Tischler joined the Woodlands School, a school for disabled children and adults. Initially a staff pediatrician, she was eventually promoted to medical director; in this position, she screened the resident population for phenylketonuria, then divided the phenylketonurics into treatment and control groups, testing the therapeutic effects of special diets on them without either their consent or that of their parents.

Woodlands was later closed down, and many of its former residents charged that they had been abused by the personnel; however, a 2001 report into conditions at Woodlands, and abuse committed by its personnel, did not mention Tischler.
