= Blüm machine gun =

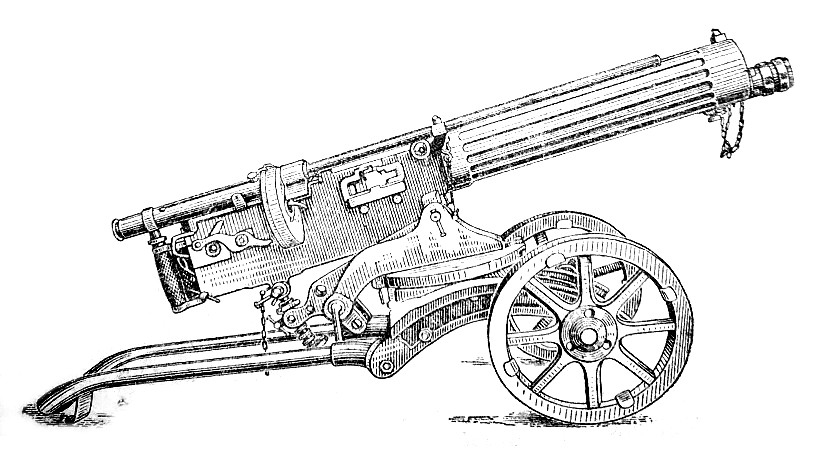
Blüm machine gun, mounted coaxially with a Maxim 1910.

The Blüm machine gun (Russian: Пулемёт Блюма) was a Soviet training machine gun designed by Mikhail Nikolayevich Blüm around 1929. It was chambered for the .22 Long Rifle cartridge. The gun was developed in order to reduce the training costs in terms of ammunition and wear of the Soviet machine guns in service at the time.

Known production figures for this gun at the Degtyarev plant are: 33 made in 1933, 1,150 made in 1934 and 1,515 made in 1935.

The large surplus of 7.62×54mmR machine guns and ammunition available in the Soviet Union after the end of World War II made the Blüm guns obsolete for training purposes. After they were decommissioned from the military in the 1950s, some of Blüm guns were refitted with wooden stocks and used as varmint guns in a campaign to control wolf populations. In this application they were considered superior to 12-gauge shotguns loaded with buckshot, particularly because they were employed from aircraft flying at 50–100 meters, and a salvo from the Blüm gun could kill an entire wolfpack.
