= Bloom Creek (South Dakota) =

Stream in South Dakota, U.S.

Coordinates: 43°32′27″N 97°49′08″W

Bloom Creek is a stream in the U.S. state of South Dakota.

Bloom Creek has the name of Peter Bloom, an early settler.

== See also ==
- List of rivers of South Dakota
