= Heinrich Blume =

Heinrich Blume (born 25 January 1887 in Hamelin; died 26 July 1964 in Hannover) was a German teacher and an antisemitic member of the Nazi Party (NSDAP), which he joined in the 1920s.
