= Walter Blume =

Walter Blume may refer to:

- Walter Blume (musician) (born in the 1880s; active 1910s–1930s), German kapellmeister, music critic, and scholar of Johannes Brahms
- Walter Blume (aircraft designer) (1896–1964), German fighter ace of World War I and aircraft designer
- Walter Blume (SS officer) (1906–1974), German Nazi SS-Standartenführer
