= Heinrich Blum =

Czech architect

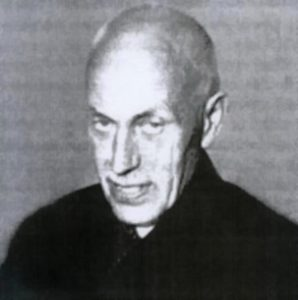
Heinrich Blum Portrait

Heinrich Blum (name sometimes written in Czechized form Jindřich Blum; 16 January 1884, in Soběšice, today part of Brno – 1942) was a Czech architect.

== Biography ==
Blum was born into a Jewish family. From 1903 to 1921 he studied at German Technical University in Brno. His study was interrupted by the WWI, where he served in the Austrian army until 1918. Later he continued to work at the university. Together with architects Arnošt Wiesner, Otto Eisler and Zikmund Kerekes he was influenced by works of Adolf Loos.

At the beginning of November 1941 he married Gertrude Nasch.

In 1942 Blum was deported to concentration camps Theresienstadt and Lublin. He died at an unknown location.
