= Hans Blom (philosopher) =

Dutch philosopher

- Scientific career
- Fields: History of Political Philosophy, Moral Philosophy
- Workplaces: Erasmus University

Hans Willem Blom (born 25 April 1947, Zandvoort) is a Professor of Social and Political Philosophy at Erasmus University. Previously he lectured at the University of Wisconsin–Madison and Cambridge University. He edits Grotiana, a journal devoted to studies on the Dutch thinker Hugo Grotius.

== Published work ==
- Monarchisms in the Age of Enlightenment. Toronto. 2006.
- Grotius and the Stoa. Van Gorcum. 2004.
- Hobbes: The Amsterdam Debate. Olms. 2001.
