= David Blume =

American businessman and permaculture teacher

David Blume is an American permaculture teacher and entrepreneur. He is an advocate for production of ethanol fuel, especially at local, small and medium scales.

== Major work ==
Blume is the author of Alcohol Can Be A Gas!, a review of the history of alcohol used as a fuel, together with an extensive investigation of how to produce alcohol fuel from different crops, using a variety of tools and techniques, and with an explanation of relevant laws and industry practices. The focus of the book is on how to set up and run crops and facilities for local ethanol use, as opposed to large-scale industrial or commercial use.

The book was originally written in 1983 for release with Alcohol as Fuel, a 10-episode how-to series on PBS produced by KQED in San Francisco. Copies of the original book and TV series, which was only aired on KQED, have since been nearly impossible to obtain. The book was rewritten and expanded to 640 pages over several years and re-released with the same title on November 1, 2007.

Blume's primary insight follows from that of Buckminster Fuller, who wrote the foreword to the book in 1983: that alcohol (or ethanol) is a renewable variety of solar energy in liquid form, the cultivation of which can enhance soils, be used as a minimally- or non-polluting fuel, and enable farmers and individuals at large to make fuel locally.

== Other projects ==
At one time or another Blume has been involved in the following projects.

- Employed by NASA (1978), at an experimental solar self-sufficient energy, sewage treatment, desalinization plant in the Virgin Islands.
- Employed by Mother Earth News Eco Village in North Carolina, part of team practicing alternative building techniques.
- Founder, American Homegrown Fuel Co., an educational organization teaching farmers and others how to produce and use alcohol fuel.
- Founder, Planetary Movers Inc (1984).
- Board member, field worker, Ecosites International.
- Board member, field worker, Vivamos Mejor (1990).
- Board member, Committee for Sustainable Agriculture (aka Ecological Farming Association).
- Executive director, 1,600-acre (6.5 km^{2}) Hidden Villa Farm and Wilderness Preserve.
- Founder (1993), executive director, International Institute for Ecological Agriculture, Santa Cruz, CA.
- Founder, Our Farm, a CSA formerly in Woodside, CA.

== See also ==
- Alcohol fuel
- Ethanol fuel
- Food vs fuel

== Bibliography ==
- Alcohol Can Be a Gas!: Fueling an Ethanol Revolution for the 21st Century (with editor Michael Winks; International Institute for Ecological Agriculture; November 1, 2007) ISBN 978-0-9790437-7-2
- Alcohol Can Be A Gas! (Planetary Energy Productions/Golden Gate Productions; 1983) ASIN B001E39L8Y
- "Food and Permaculture", a defense of permaculture by Blume
