= Bloom Township, Clay County, Kansas =

Bloom Township
- Township
- Location in Clay County
- Coordinates: 39°26′30″N 097°18′01″W
- Country: United States
- State: Kansas
- County: Clay

Area
  - Total: 47.46 sq mi (122.92 km^{2})
  - Land: 47.21 sq mi (122.27 km^{2})
  - Water: 0.25 sq mi (0.66 km^{2}) 0.54%
- Elevation: 1,299 ft (396 m)

Population (2020)
  - Total: 161
  - Density: 3.41/sq mi (1.32/km^{2})
- GNIS feature ID: 0476012

Bloom Township is a township in Clay County, Kansas, United States. At the 2020 census, its population was 161.

== Geography ==
Bloom Township covers an area of 47.46 square miles (122.9 km^{2}) and contains no incorporated settlements. According to the USGS, it contains two cemeteries: Bloom and Lincoln.

The stream of Mulberry Creek runs through this township.
