= Bloom Township, Ford County, Kansas =

Bloom Township
- Township
- Location in Ford County
- Coordinates: 37°31′20″N 099°55′36″W
- Country: United States
- State: Kansas
- County: Ford

Area
  - Total: 55.43 sq mi (143.56 km^{2})
  - Land: 55.43 sq mi (143.56 km^{2})
  - Water: 0 sq mi (0 km^{2}) 0%
- Elevation: 2,582 ft (787 m)

Population (2020)
  - Total: 110
  - Density: 2.0/sq mi (0.77/km^{2})
- GNIS feature ID: 0470694

Bloom Township is a township in Ford County, Kansas, United States. As of the 2020 census, its population was 110.

== Geography ==
Bloom Township covers an area of 55.43 square miles (143.6 km^{2}) and contains no incorporated settlements. According to the USGS, it contains one cemetery, Bloom.

== Transportation ==
Bloom Township contains one airport or landing strip, Shelor Airport.
