= Bloom (2021 film) =

2021 short film by Richard Anthony

- Directed by: Richard Anthony
- Written by: Richard Anthony; Deepthi Govindarajan; Sanaa Mariam
- Starring: Mitra Visvesh; Ashwin Raam
- Narrated by: Kaber Vasuki
- Cinematography: Niketh Bommireddy
- Edited by: Sangathamizhan E.
- Music by: Hari Madras Rengarajan
- Production company: Room 101 Productions
- Distributed by: Madras Talkies
- Release date: 19 May 2021 (YouTube)
- Running time: 36 minutes
- Country: India
- Language: Tamil

Bloom is a 2021 Indian Tamil-language short film directed by Richard Anthony, starring Mitra Visvesh and Ashwin Raam. The plot focuses on the romance between two different people, set in Chennai against the backdrop of COVID-19 lockdown in India in March 2020. The short film featured music by Hari Madras Rengarajan, cinematography handled by Niketh Bommireddy and edited by Sangathamizhan E. It was distributed by Mani Ratnam's production house Madras Talkies, and the film released on 19 May 2021 through YouTube.

== Plot ==
Mitra, an artist and Ashwin, a budding musician reside in the same street in Chennai. After a nationwide lockdown to curb COVID-19 pandemic was imposed in March 2020, Ashwin started connecting virtually with Mitra and they develop a special bond within each other as they start exploring each other's life. They experience all kinds of emotions such as love, happiness, fun, excitement, guilt, jitters, confusion, loneliness, silence, through their relationship in the lockdown phase. The rest of the story is about their virtual relationship and how Mitra met Ashwin in person, for the first time.

== Cast ==
- Mitra Visvesh as Mitra
- Ashwin Raam as Ashwin
- Kaber Vasuki as The God (narrator; voice-only)

== Soundtrack ==
Bloom

Soundtrack album by Hari Madras Rengarajan
- Released: 7 June 2021
- Recorded: 2021
- Genre: Film soundtrack
- Length: 30:50
- Language: Tamil
- Label: 101 Records
- Producer: Hari Madras Rengarajan

The music for the film is composed by Hari Madras Rengarajan and the short also featured poems written and recited by Kaber Vasuki. The original soundtrack album featured thirteen tracks composed by Rengarajan and his music band Sonocosm, and was released in its entirety on 7 June 2021 through Spotify, iTunes and Apple Music.

Track listing
No.	Title	Artist(s)	Length
1.	"Uyir"	Hari Madras Rengarajan, Kaber Vasuki	00:48
2.	"Ellaigal"	Hari Madras Rengarajan, Kaber Vasuki	01:50
3.	"Thuvakkam"	Hari Madras Rengarajan, Kaber Vasuki	01:26
4.	"Big Bang"	Hari Madras Rengarajan, Sonocosm	01:08
5.	"Sundowner"	Hari Madras Rengarajan, Sonocosm	02:52
6.	"MTRA"	Hari Madras Rengarajan, Sonocosm	02:58
7.	"Doobie Muse"	Hari Madras Rengarajan, Sonocosm	01:45
8.	"Video Love"	Hari Madras Rengarajan, Sonocosm	02:41
9.	"Contemplation"	Hari Madras Rengarajan, Sonocosm	02:30
10.	"Reality vs. Fiction"	Hari Madras Rengarajan, Sonocosm	03:53
11.	"Strangers in Paradise"	Hari Madras Rengarajan, Sonocosm	03:32
12.	"Sundowner" (Reprise)	Hari Madras Rengarajan, Sonocosm	02:35
13.	"Bloom"	Hari Madras Rengarajan, Sonocosm	02:44

== Marketing and release ==
Madras Talkies announced the distribution of the short film and presented the first look through their social media handles on 10 May 2021. The film was released on 19 May 2021.

== Reception ==
Asuthosh Mohan of Film Companion South reviewed, "It’s not so much a denial of reality than a suggestion that films that help you cope are not necessarily an escape from reality. The pandemic, after all, plays God in Bloom." Avinash Ramachandran of Cinema Express wrote, "There is no right or wrong in Bloom because it is set in a space where the lines can actually be blurred, and no one would bat an eyelid. Just like most things in the world, the beauty and the not-so-beautiful parts of Bloom squarely lies in the eyes of the beholder."
