= Hans Blum (journalist) =

German journalist (1841–1910)

- Born: 8 June 1841; Leipzig
- Died: 30 January 1910 (aged 68)
- Citizenship: German
- Occupation: journalist

Hans Blum (8 June 1841 – 30 January 1910) was a German journalist and writer.

== Biography ==
Born Johann Georg Maximillian Blum in Leipzig, he was a son of Robert Blum, and was educated in the universities of Leipzig and Bern, sat in the North German Reichstag 1867–1870, and was a barrister in Leipzig 1869–1897. In the Franco-Prussian War he served in the field as correspondent for Daheim and edited the Grenzboten from 1871 to 1879. He wrote extensively on contemporary politics and among his works are Die Lügen unserer Socialdemokratie (The lies of our social democracy; 1891), Fürst Bismarck und seine Zeit (Prince Bismarck and his times; 1894–1895), Das erste Vierteljahrhundert des deutschen Reichs (The first quarter century of the German Empire; 1896), Persönliche Erinnerungen an den Fürsten Bismarck (Personal recollections of Prince Bismarck; 1910), Aus dem tollen Jahr (dealing with the revolution of 1848; 1901), dramas, short stories and novels, of which Bernhard von Weimar is the most remarkable.

Hans Blum married Anna Fischer on 8 August 1865 in Rheinfelden, Germany. They had five children; Gertrude, Adele, Kurt, Walter, and Anna. Blum died in Rheinfelden in 1910.
