= Bloem (name) =

Bloem (Dutch pronunciation: [blum]) is a Dutch name, meaning "flower" as well as "flour". As a feminine given name, also rendered Bloeme, it signifies flower, youth, and beauty. The surname can have a variety of origins; besides a matronymic, the surname can have originated as descriptive (e.g. finest) or metonymic occupational (gardener, miller, baker). The variants Bloeme and Bloemen are thought to be primarily matronymic. People with the name include:

== Given name ==
- Bloeme Evers-Emden (1926–2016), Dutch Jewish teacher and child psychologist
- Bloem de Ligny (born 1978), Dutch singer/songwriter and visual artist

== Surname ==
Bloem

- Adriaen Bloem or Adriaen van Bloemen (1639–c.1697), Flemish painter active in Austria
- An Bloem, eponymous character from the 1983 Dutch movie
- Arend Bloem (born 1947), Dutch sprint canoer
- J. C. Bloem (1887–1966), Dutch poet and essayist, grandson of Jacobus Cornelis Bloem
- Jacobus Cornelis Bloem (1825–1902), Dutch politician, Minister of Finances 1885–88
- Jamie Bloem (born 1971), Australian rugby player and referee
- Marion Bloem (born 1952), Dutch writer and film maker
- Nico Bloem (born 1994), German politician
- Walter Bloem (1868–1951), German novelist and soldier
- Walter Julius Bloem (1898–1945), German writer and soldier, son of the above

Bloemen

- Adriaen van Bloemen or Adriaen Bloem (1639–c.1697), Flemish painter active in Austria
- Johannes Bloemen (1864–1939), Dutch swimmer
- Karin Bloemen (born 1960), Dutch actress and singer
- Ted-Jan Bloemen (born 1986), Dutch-Canadian speed skater

Three brothers Van Bloemen:

- Jan Frans van Bloemen (1662–1749), Flemish landscape painter active in Italy
- Norbert van Bloemen (1670–1746), Flemish painter active in Holland
- Pieter van Bloemen (1657–1720), Flemish landscape and animal painter

== Places ==
- The nickname and shortened form of Bloemfontein, a city in South Africa

== See also ==
- Blom (surname), Dutch surname of the same origin
- Bloom (surname), English surname of the same origin
- Blum (disambiguation), German surname of the same origin
