= Leonardo Coccorante =

Italian painter (1680–1750)

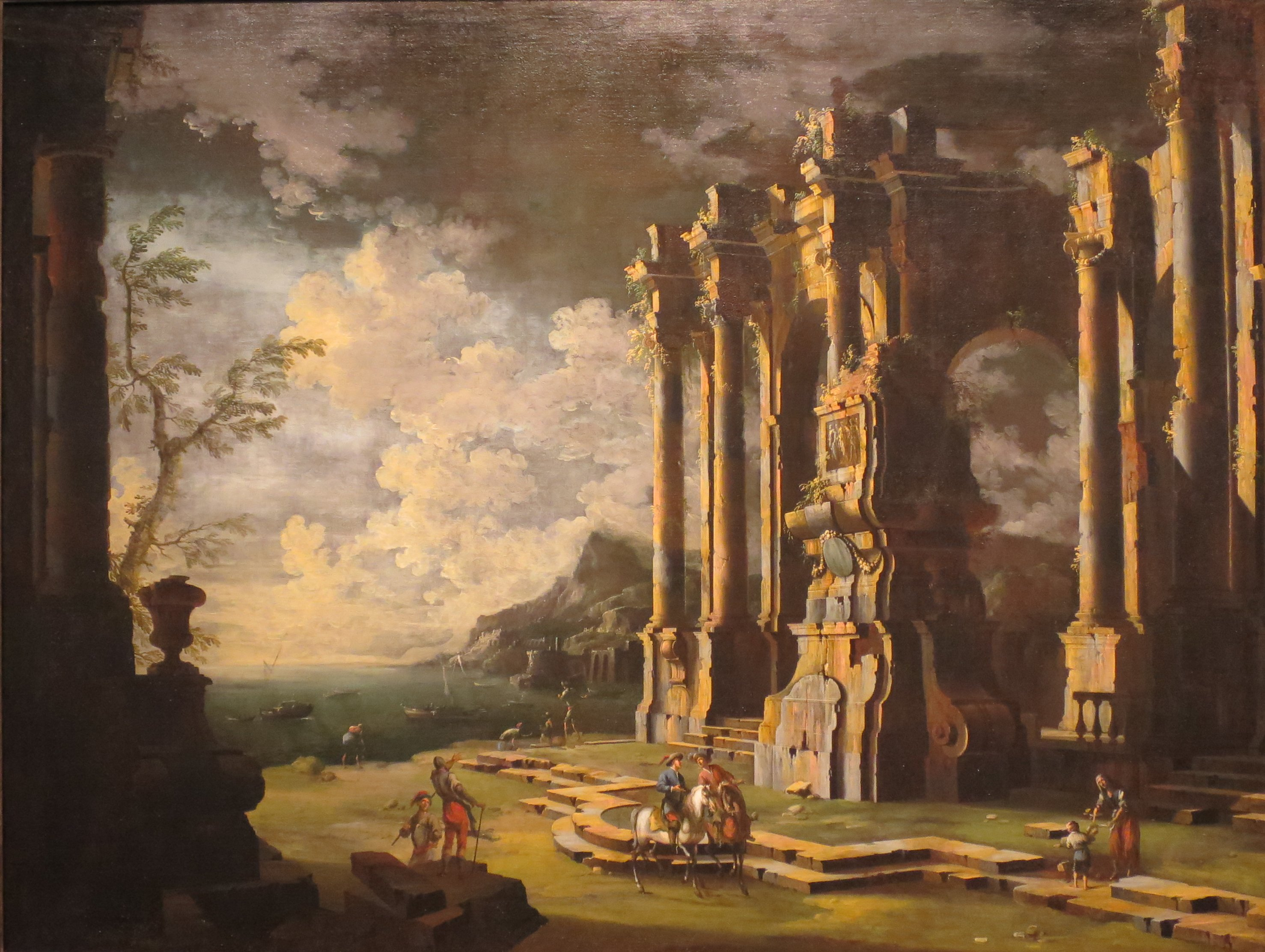
Harbor with Roman Ruins by Leonardo Coccorante, c. 1740-50, Honolulu Museum of Art

Leonardo Coccorante (1680–1750) was an Italian painter known for his capricci depicting imaginary landscapes with ruins of classical architecture.

== Life ==
Leonardo Coccorante was born in Naples, Kingdom of Naples. He studied or worked under Nicola Casissa, the Flemish landscape painter Jan Frans van Bloemen (1662–1749), Angelo Maria Costa (1670–1721), and finally with Gabriele Ricciardelli (active between 1741 and 1777). From 1737 to 1739, he was employed decorating the royal palace of Naples.

Coccorante died in Naples in 1750.

== Work ==
He is best known for his large highly detailed landscapes with imaginary classical architectural ruins. He often included small figures in the foreground to emphasize the expansiveness of the ruins. Coccorante is classified as a veduta (vista) painter. Public collections holding paintings by Coccorante include the Museo Regionale Agostino Pepoli (Trapani, Italy), Pinacoteca del Castello Sforzesco (Milan, Italy), the Louvre, the Musée départemental de l'Oise (Beauvais, France), the Museum of Grenoble ( France), the Lowe Art Museum (Coral Gables, Florida), and the Honolulu Museum of Art, .

== Gallery ==
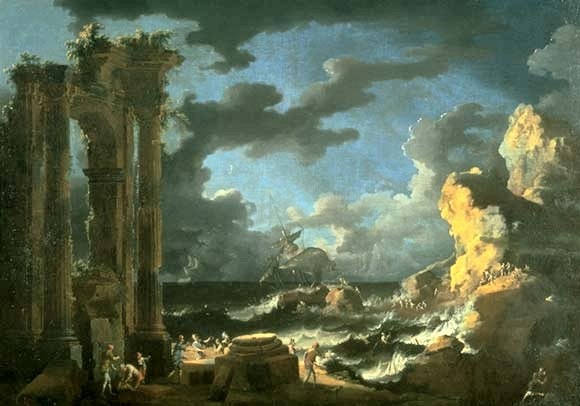
Port of Ostia During a Tempest, oil on canvas, 1740s, Lowe Art Museum

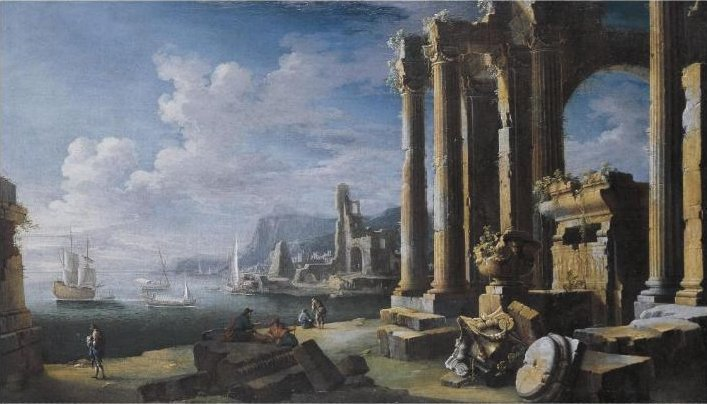
Capriccio of architectural ruins with a seascape beyond, oil on canvas

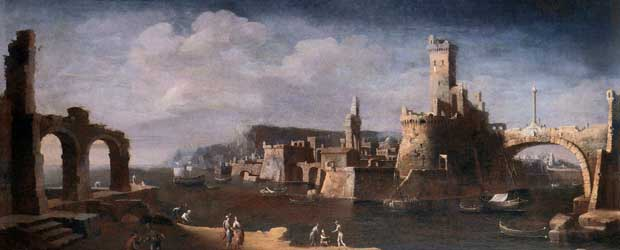
Port of Tarento, oil on canvas painting, 1738

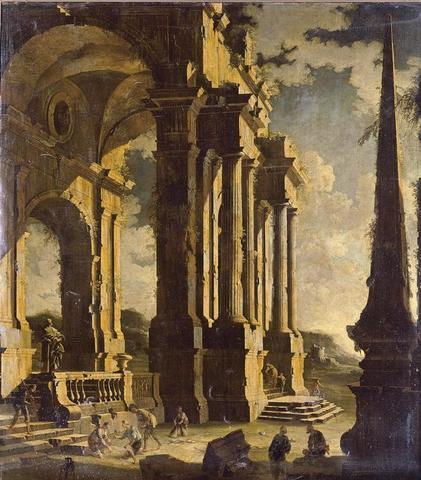
Capriccio of classical ruins with figures, oil on canvas

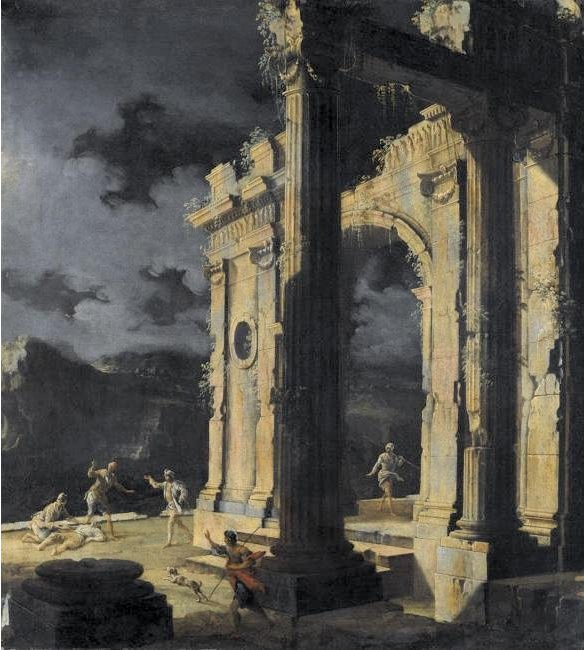
Capriccio of ruins with figures under stormy night sky, oil on canvas

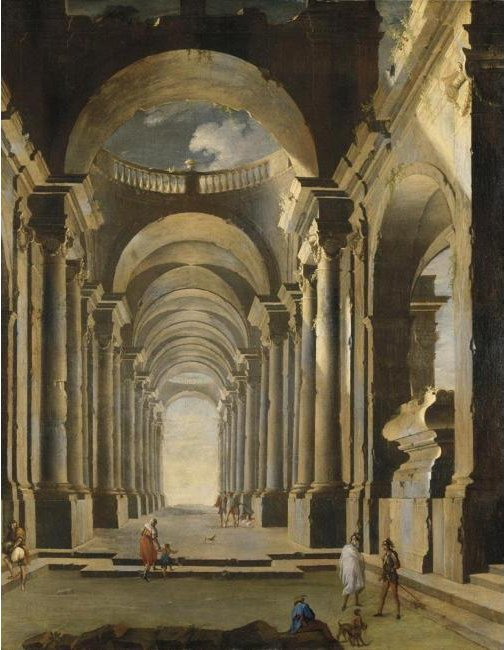
Architecture with figures, oil on canvas

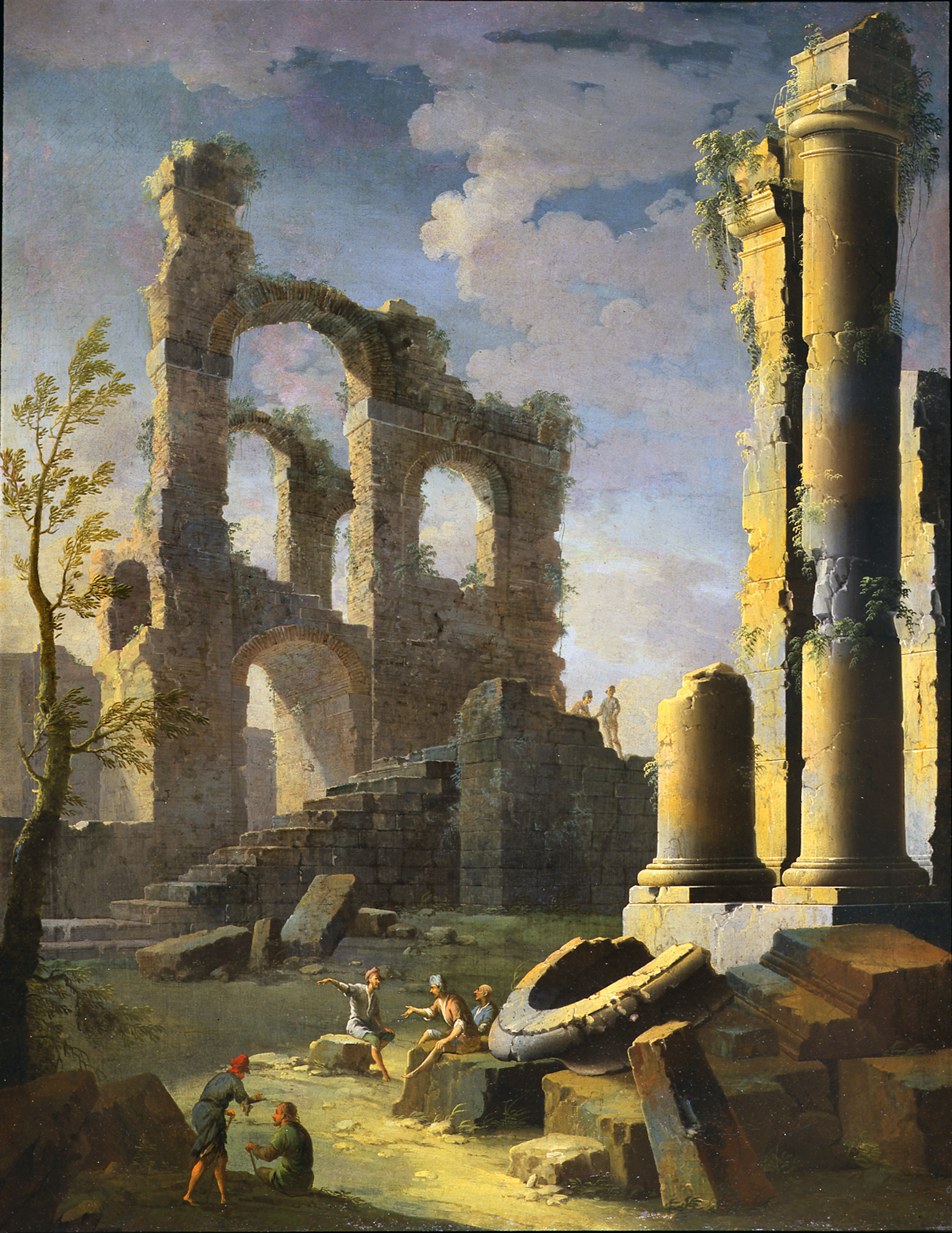
Architectural Capriccio with figures, dawn. Oil on canvas, Collezione M (private collection) Rome

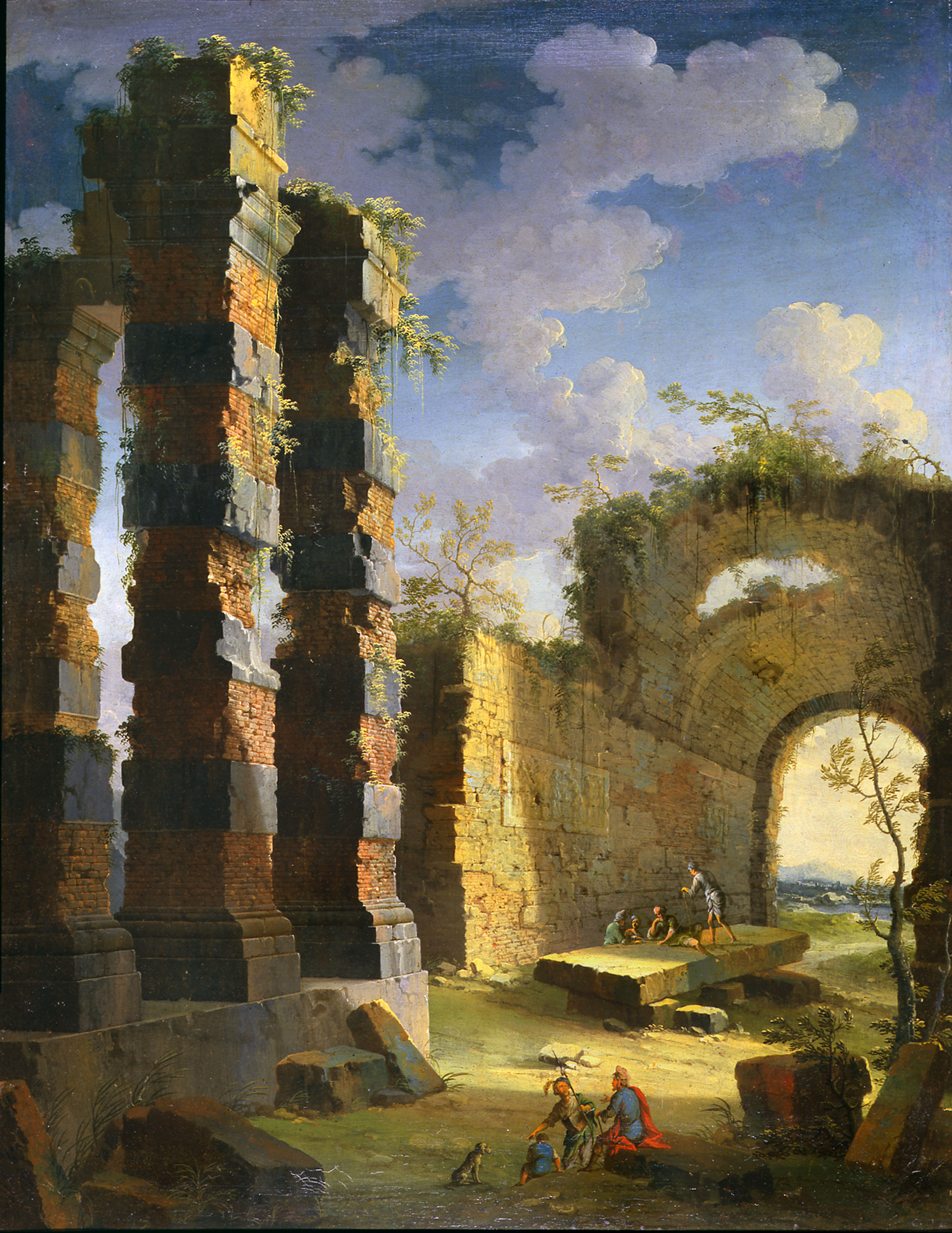
Architectural Capriccio with figures, dusk. Oil on canvas, Collezione M (private collection) Rome
