= Urlaub auf Ehrenwort =

Urlaub auf Ehrenwort (translated as Leave on Word of Honour) may refer to the following German drama films:

- Urlaub auf Ehrenwort (1938 film), directed by Karl Ritter and starring Charles Klein
- Urlaub auf Ehrenwort (1955 film), directed by Wolfgang Liebeneiner and starring Claus Biederstaedt
