= The Sin Sister =

1929 film

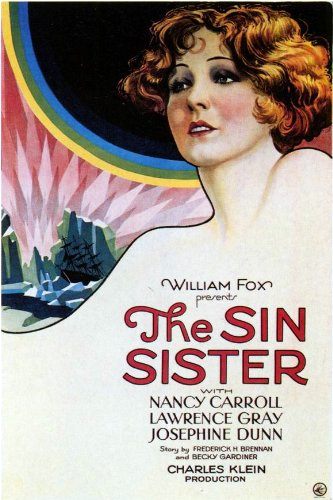
- Theatrical release poster
- Directed by: Charles Klein
- Written by: Harry Behn; Andrew Bennison
- Produced by: William Fox
- Starring: Nancy Carroll
- Cinematography: Charles G. Clarke; George Eastman
- Distributed by: Fox Film Corporation
- Release date: February 10, 1929
- Running time: 67 minutes
- Country: United States
- Languages: Sound (Synchronized) (English intertitles)

The Sin Sister is a lost 1929 American Synchronized sound drama adventure film directed by Charles Klein and starring Nancy Carroll. While the film has no audible dialog, it was released with a synchronized musical score with sound effects using the sound-on-film movietone process. It was produced and distributed by the Fox Film Corporation.

== Plot ==
As the last steamer of the season departs Nome, Alaska, a diverse group of passengers is aboard: wealthy industrialist Joseph Horn, his pampered daughter Ethelyn Horn, her fiancé Bob Newton, the pious missionary Sister Burton, and a lighthearted vaudeville team that includes dancer Pearl. Also traveling with them is Horn’s timid secretary, Peter Van Dykeman.

Their journey soon turns perilous. Ice floes close in on the vessel, trapping it fast in the frozen sea. The situation grows dire until a group of passing fur traders offers to escort them to safety by dog team—for a price. Horn grudgingly pays $2,000 to secure the rescue.

The travelers set out by sled, but on their first night, disaster strikes: the sleds and supplies are stolen, leaving the party stranded in the desolate Alaskan wilderness. They stumble upon a deserted trading post and take shelter there.

With little food and no certainty of rescue, their ordeal exposes their true characters. Horn, blustering in prosperity, reveals himself to be a coward. Ethelyn, once refined, grows slovenly and hysterical under the strain. Sister Burton, whose faith had once steadied others, becomes embittered and shaken in her beliefs.

By contrast, Pearl, the chorus girl once dismissed as frivolous and immoral, proves to be resourceful and steadfast. She encourages the group, using humor and vaudeville routines to keep up morale. Even Peter, the effete secretary, finds himself relying on her courage.

Tension escalates when one of the native traders, Al, returns and demands a shocking price for his assistance: a white girl as his reward. When Peter resists, Al shoots him, gravely wounding him.

The survivors’ plight becomes even more precarious. Al, now threatening the group, makes clear that his protection—and food—will come only if Pearl surrenders herself to him.

Pearl appears to waver, but when the moment comes, she seizes Al’s rifle, turning the tables. With the gun in her hands, she forces him to provide medicine and food for the wounded Peter, and she demands the return of the stolen dogs and sleds. Her quick thinking and bravery rescue the group from despair.

Peter, weak but recovering, realizes both the depth of Pearl’s courage and his own unexpected resilience. Summoning his strength, he resolves to act. With Pearl’s help, he boards a sled, and together they set out across the snowfields to seek real help.

Back at the cabin, the others wait, their true natures exposed by the ordeal: Horn, a coward; Ethelyn, a broken society girl; Sister Burton, a woman whose faith faltered. Only Pearl—the supposed “sin sister”—has shown genuine strength, compassion, and moral integrity.

== Cast ==
- Nancy Carroll as Pearl
- Lawrence Gray as Peter Van Dykeman
- Josephine Dunn as Ethelyn Horn
- Myrtle Stedman as Sister Burton
- Anders Randolf as Joseph Horn
- Richard Alexander as Bob Newton
- Frederick Graham as Ship Captain
- George Davis as Mate
- David Callis as Al

== See also ==
- 1937 Fox vault fire
- List of early sound feature films (1926–1929)
