= Urlaub auf Ehrenwort (1955 film) =

1955 film

Leave on Word of Honour
- Directed by: Wolfgang Liebeneiner
- Written by: Kilian Koll (novella); Charles Klein; Felix Lützkendorf; Wolfgang Liebeneiner
- Produced by: Friedrich Wilhelm Gaik
- Starring: Claus Biederstaedt; Eva Ingeborg Scholz; Reinhard Kolldehoff
- Cinematography: Bruno Timm
- Edited by: Ilse Voigt
- Music by: Hans-Martin Majewski
- Production company: Algefa Film
- Distributed by: Schorcht Filmverleih
- Release date: 30 December 1955
- Running time: 101 minutes
- Country: West Germany
- Language: German

Urlaub auf Ehrenwort (translated as Leave on Word of Honour) is a 1955 West German drama film directed by Wolfgang Liebeneiner and starring Claus Biederstaedt, Eva Ingeborg Scholz and Reinhard Kolldehoff. It is a remake of the 1939 film Urlaub auf Ehrenwort about German soldiers granted leave during the Second World War.

The film's art direction was by Willi Herrmann and Wilhelm Vorwerg.

== Cast ==
- Claus Biederstaedt as Lt. Walter Prätorius
- Eva Ingeborg Scholz as Dr. Inge Rochter
- Reinhard Kolldehoff as Otto Sasse
- Karl John as Köhler
- Hans Quest as Gustav Jahnke
- Paul Esser as Offc. Paul Hartmann
- Gisela von Collande as Anna Hartmann
- Edelweiß Malchin as Lulu
- Peter Elsholtz as SS-Gruppenführer Böttcher
- Heinz Giese as Hans
- Edith Hancke as Erna
- Luitgard Im as Dagmar Köhler
- Ruth Johansson as Mariana
- Helmuth Lohner as Grenadier Richard Hellwig
- Ingrid Lutz as Hedwig Kramer
- Gerd Martienzen as Gefreiter Dr. Strötzel
- Wolfgang Neuss as Gefr. Krawutke
- Rainer Penkert as Sanitätsgefreiter Hagen
- Elfie Pertramer as Artistin Dolores
- Willi Rose as Feldwebel Thiele
- Siegmar Schneider as Oberst Grell
- Edith Schollwer as Mutter Krawutke
- Maria Sebaldt as Fritzi
- Josef Sieber as Lkw-Fahrer Schulze
- Jakob Tiedtke as Herr Koppe
- Gisela Trowe as Frau Schmiedecke
- Helen Vita as Tänzerin Ilonka
- Rudolf Vogel as Rudi Pichler
- Fritz Wagner as Unteroffizier Kramer
- Herbert Weissbach as Feldwebel Schneider
- Ewald Wenck as Vater Krawutke
- Ralf Wolter as Gefreiter Max Schmiedecke

== Bibliography ==
- Williams, Alan. Film and Nationalism. Rutgers University Press, 2002.
