= Nicola Casissa =

Italian painter

Nicola Casissa (active early 18th-century, died 1731) was an Italian painter, active in Campania and Naples (both part of the Kingdom of Naples) as a painter of still-life scenes of fruits, flowers, and birds.

He was a pupil of Andrea Belvedere. A number of this paintings were in the 1714 inventory of Duke Nicola Coppola of Canzano. Among his pupils are Leonardo Coccorante and Giorgio Garri.
