= Blindfold (1928 film) =

1928 film

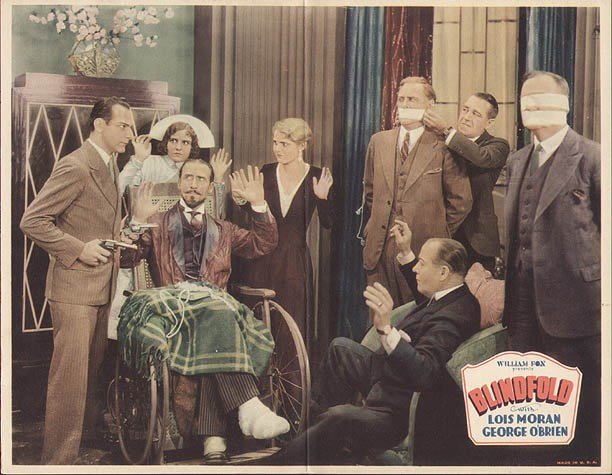
- Film poster
- Directed by: Charles Klein
- Screenplay by: Ewart Adamson; Robert Horwood; William Kernell
- Story by: Charles Francis Coe
- Starring: Lois Moran; George O'Brien; Maria Alba; Earle Foxe; Don Terry; Fritz Feld
- Cinematography: Lucien Andriot
- Edited by: Jack Dennis
- Production company: Fox Film Corporation
- Distributed by: Fox Film Corporation
- Release date: December 9, 1928
- Running time: 65 minutes
- Country: United States
- Languages: Sound (Synchronized) (English Intertitles)

Blindfold is a 1928 American synchronized sound drama film directed by Charles Klein and written by Ewart Adamson, Robert Horwood and William Kernell. While the film has no audible dialog, it was released with a synchronized musical score with sound effects using the sound-on-film movietone process. The film stars Lois Moran, George O'Brien, Maria Alba, Earle Foxe, Don Terry and Fritz Feld. The film was released on December 9, 1928, by Fox Film Corporation. It was based on a story by Charles Francis Coe.

== Plot ==
Lois Moran stars as Mary Brower, a young woman whose life is shattered when her brother is killed by gangsters. Mary’s sweetheart, Officer Robert “Bob” Kelly, is a dedicated policeman determined to bring the criminals to justice.

The film opens in Mary’s modest home, where she shares a close bond with her brother Buddy Brower. As Buddy leaves for the store, gangsters led by the cunning Dr. Cornelius Simmons murder him in cold blood. Kelly arrives shortly after and catches sight of the getaway car. Among the fleeing criminals is Thomas Bernard, whom Kelly recognizes as a suspect.

Despite Kelly’s efforts and a week-long search, Bernard is arrested but later released due to insufficient evidence. Kelly returns to the store to investigate further but is violently attacked and knocked unconscious by one of Simmons’ henchmen.

Meanwhile, Mary arrives at the scene during the confrontation and suffers a severe mental collapse from the trauma, falling into a state of amnesia and confusion. Dr. Simmons, a master criminal, exploits Mary’s vulnerable condition by manipulating her into believing she is part of his gang. Using her as a decoy, Simmons attempts to use Mary to facilitate a daring million-dollar jewel heist, orchestrated with the help of his gang members including Pepita and others.

Kelly, refusing to give up, spots Mary riding in a luxurious car linked to the criminals’ secret headquarters. He follows her and confronts her inside the gang’s lair. Although Mary initially rebuffs him, still under Simmons’ influence, Kelly’s unwavering love and determination help her regain her memory. Together, Kelly and Mary devise a plan to deceive Simmons and his gang by feigning that Mary’s mental collapse continues. Their ruse allows Kelly to gain the upper hand and orchestrate the capture of the entire criminal organization.

In the aftermath, Kelly is reinstated as a police sergeant by Captain Jenkins, and Mary’s recovery progresses well. The film closes on a hopeful note, with the couple embarking on a 30-day honeymoon, symbolizing justice and love triumphing over crime.

== Cast ==
- Lois Moran as Mary Brower
- George O'Brien as Robert Kelly
- Maria Alba as Pepita
- Earle Foxe as Dr. Cornelius Simmons
- Don Terry as Buddy Brower
- Fritz Feld as Thomas Bernard
- Andy Clyde as Funeral
- Crauford Kent as Ackroyd
- Robert Homans as Captain Jenkins
- John Kelly as Chauffeur
- Phillips Smalley as Jeweler

== Music ==
The soundtrack featured the song "Forever" by Milton Ager and Jack Yellen as the theme song for the film.

== Critical reception ==
A review in the trade publication Harrison's Reports described the film as having a "not so pleasant" start, but added that interest increased as the film progressed until the climax "makes the spectator hold his breath".

== See also ==
- List of early sound feature films (1926–1929)
