= Pleasure Crazed =

1929 film

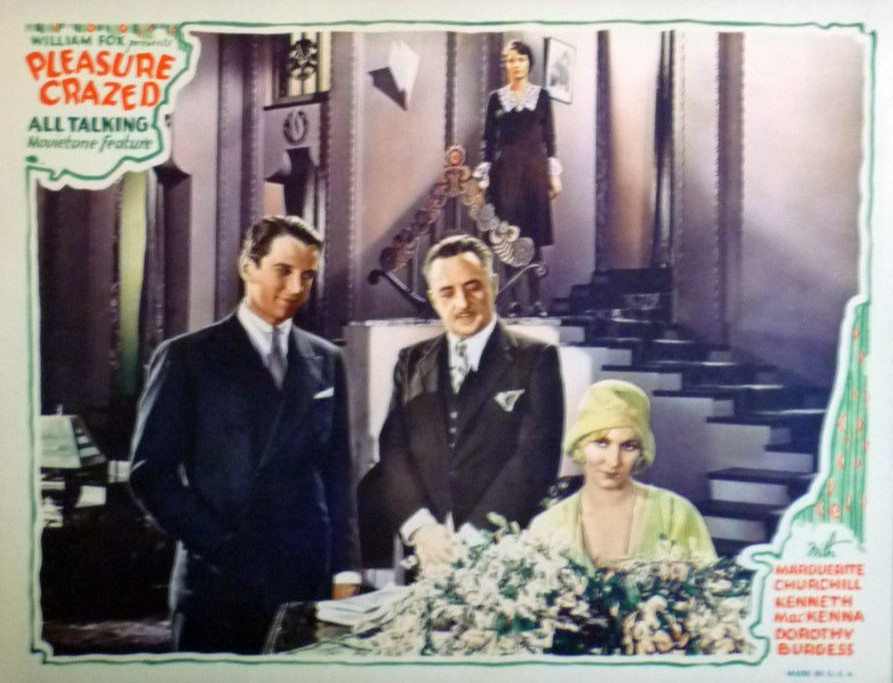
- Lobby card
- Directed by: Donald Gallaher; Charles Klein
- Screenplay by: Douglas Z. Doty; Clare Kummer
- Based on: The Scent of Sweet Almonds by Monckton Hoffe
- Starring: Marguerite Churchill; Kenneth MacKenna; Dorothy Burgess; Campbell Gullan; Douglas Gilmore; Henry Kolker
- Cinematography: Glen MacWilliams; Ernest Palmer
- Edited by: J. Edwin Robbins
- Production company: Fox Film Corporation
- Distributed by: Fox Film Corporation
- Release date: July 7, 1929
- Running time: 60 minutes
- Country: United States
- Language: English

Pleasure Crazed is a 1929 American sound (All-Talking) drama film directed by Donald Gallaher and Charles Klein and written by Douglas Z. Doty and Clare Kummer. The film stars Marguerite Churchill, Kenneth MacKenna, Dorothy Burgess, Campbell Gullan, Douglas Gilmore, and Henry Kolker. The film was released on July 7, 1929, by Fox Film Corporation.

== Cast ==
- Marguerite Churchill as Nora Westby
- Kenneth MacKenna as Capt. Anthony Dean
- Dorothy Burgess as Alma Dean
- Campbell Gullan as Gilbert Ferguson
- Douglas Gilmore as Nigel Blain
- Henry Kolker as Col. Farquar
- Frederick H. Graham as Holland
- Rex Bell as Peters
- Charlotte Merriam as Maid

== Preservation ==
The film is believed to be lost.

== See also ==
- List of early sound feature films (1926–1929)
