= Nicolò Bonito =

Italian painter

Nicolò Bonito (died 1740 in Naples) was a painter, depicting mainly landscapes from the Kingdom of Naples.

== Biography ==
Bonito left Naples as a young man for Livorno where he met the landscape artist, Gioachinno Beich (Franz Joachim Beich). When Beich left for Germany, Bonito moved to Rome under Orizzonte (Jan Frans van Bloemen). In Naples, Bonito's disciple was Gabriello Ricciardelli (Gabrielle Ricciardelli), son of the painter Giuseppe.
