= Giorgio Garri =

Italian painter

Giorgio Garri (c. 1700 – c. 1731) was an Italian painter, active in Naples as a painter of still-life scenes of fruits, flowers, and birds.

He was a pupil of Nicola Casissa. Grossi may confuse some of his biography with that of his brother, the painter Giovanni Grossi, since he claims the painter died in 1750. Giorgio's daughter, Columba, was also a painter married to the painter Tommaso Castellani, and their four daughters, Francesca, Ruffina, Apollonia, and Bibiana Castellani were also painters.

In modern accounting, Girogio died in 1731 after becoming blind. His brother was a painter of marine and landscapes, while his daughter was a painter of still lives of flowers and food, but later of cityscapes. Her daughter and husband were mainly ornamentalists.
