= Gypsy Blood (1934 film) =

1934 film

- Directed by: Charles Klein
- Written by: Friedrich Dammann; Max Wallner
- Starring: Adele Sandrock; Georg Alexander; Erik Ode
- Cinematography: E. W. Fiedler; Bruno Mondi
- Music by: Will Meisel
- Production company: ABC-Filmgesellschaft
- Distributed by: Deutsche Universal-Film
- Release date: 26 March 1934
- Running time: 85 minutes
- Country: Germany
- Language: German

Gypsy Blood (German: Zigeunerblut) is a 1934 German comedy film directed by Charles Klein and starring Adele Sandrock, Georg Alexander, and Erik Ode. It was released by the German subsidiary of Universal Pictures. In Austria it was known by the title Das Ungarmädel.

The film's sets were designed by the art director Hermann Warm.

== Cast ==
- Adele Sandrock as Die Fürstin Stauffenstein
- Georg Alexander as Graf Leopold Stauffenstein
- Erik Ode as Graf Poldi Stauffenstein
- Ralph Arthur Roberts as Graf Hohenau
- Grit Haid as Baronesse Steffi Hohenau
- Margit Symo as Ilonka
- Hans Albin as Der Zimmerkellner
- Bob Bauer
- Lillian Berley as Miß Green
- Egon Brosig as Der Oberkellner
- Lis de Boy as Die Blumenverkäuferin
- Harry Hardt as Der Hoteldirektor
- Kurt Hoellger as Ein Kellner
- Walter Jankuhn as Der Zigeunerprimas
- Rudolf Klicks as Ein Boy
- Edith Meinhard as Das Stubenmädchen
- Hadrian Maria Netto as Johann, ein Diener
- Leo Peukert as Der Hotelportier
- Karl Platen as Zweiter Geiger
- Franz Weber as Herr Schäfer
- Tina Zucchi as Amarante

== Bibliography ==
- Bock, Hans-Michael; Bergfelder, Tim, eds. (2009). The Concise Cinegraph: Encyclopaedia of German Cinema. New York: Berghahn Books. ISBN 978-1-57181-655-9.
