= Norbert van Bloemen =

Flemish painter and draughtsman

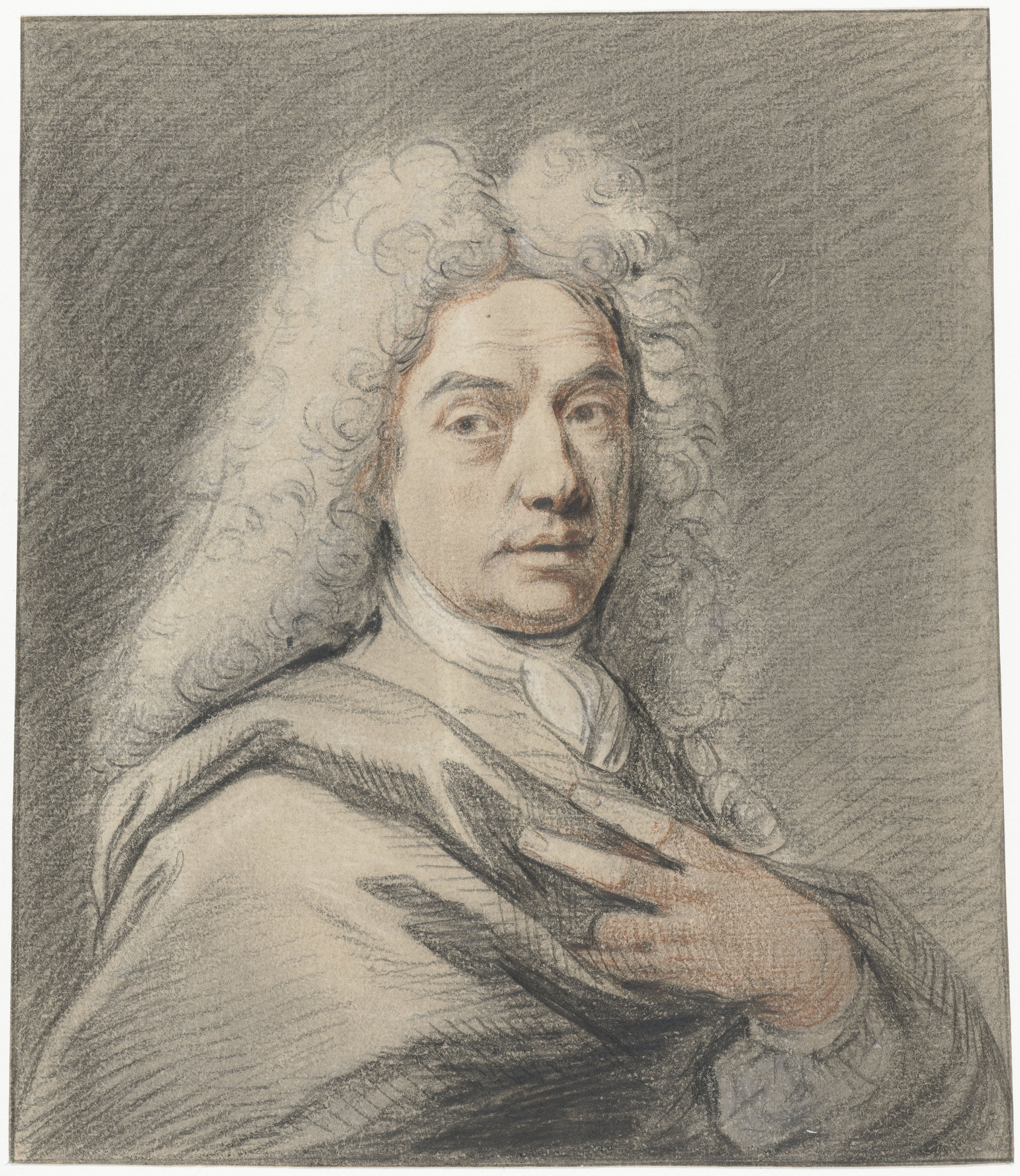
Norbert van Bloemen, Self-portrait

Norbert van Bloemen, called Cefalus or Cephalos (1670, Antwerp – 1746, Amsterdam), was a Flemish painter and draughtsman who worked mainly in the Papal States and the Dutch Republic. He is known for his Italianizing landscapes and genre scenes reminiscent of the style of the low-life paintings of the Bamboccianti. He also painted portraits and some history paintings.

== Life ==
Norbert van Bloemen was born in Antwerp as the younger brother of Pieter and Jan Frans. These two older brothers were painters who would go on to have successful careers in Italy and Antwerp. Norbert was trained by his older brother Pieter but may also have had other teachers since Pieter left Antwerp for Lyon in 1674. In Lyon Pieter was later joined by his brother Jan Frans. Pieter and Jan Frans later travelled on to Rome where in 1688 they were registered in the parish of Sant'Andrea delle Fratte. In 1690, Norbert joined his two brothers in Rome. It is not certain whether he lived with his brothers in Sant'Andrea delle Fratte.

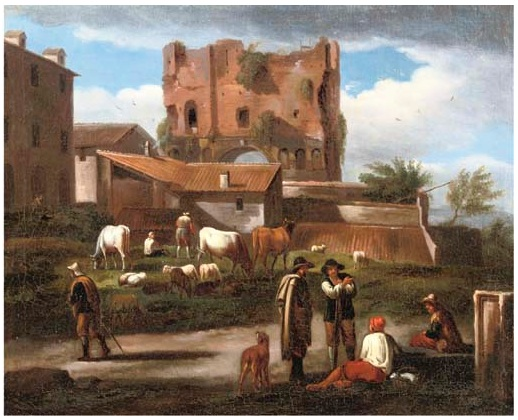
Figures conversing along a path with cattle grazing

Norbert became a member of the Bentvueghels, an association of mainly Dutch and Flemish artists active in Rome. It was common practice in the Bentvueghels to give each member a nickname, the so-called 'bent name'. Norbert's bent name was 'Cefalus' or 'Cephalos'. The reason why he was named after this Greek mythological hero has not been preserved.

By 1724, Norbert had left Rome where only his brother Jan Frans remained since Pieter had returned to his native Antwerp in 1694. Norbert possible first returned to Antwerp but did not settle in his home country possibly because of a lack of commercial success. He then went to live and work in Amsterdam instead. He remained there for his remaining life.

He was one of the teachers of Cornelis Ploos van Amstel in Amsterdam.

== Work ==
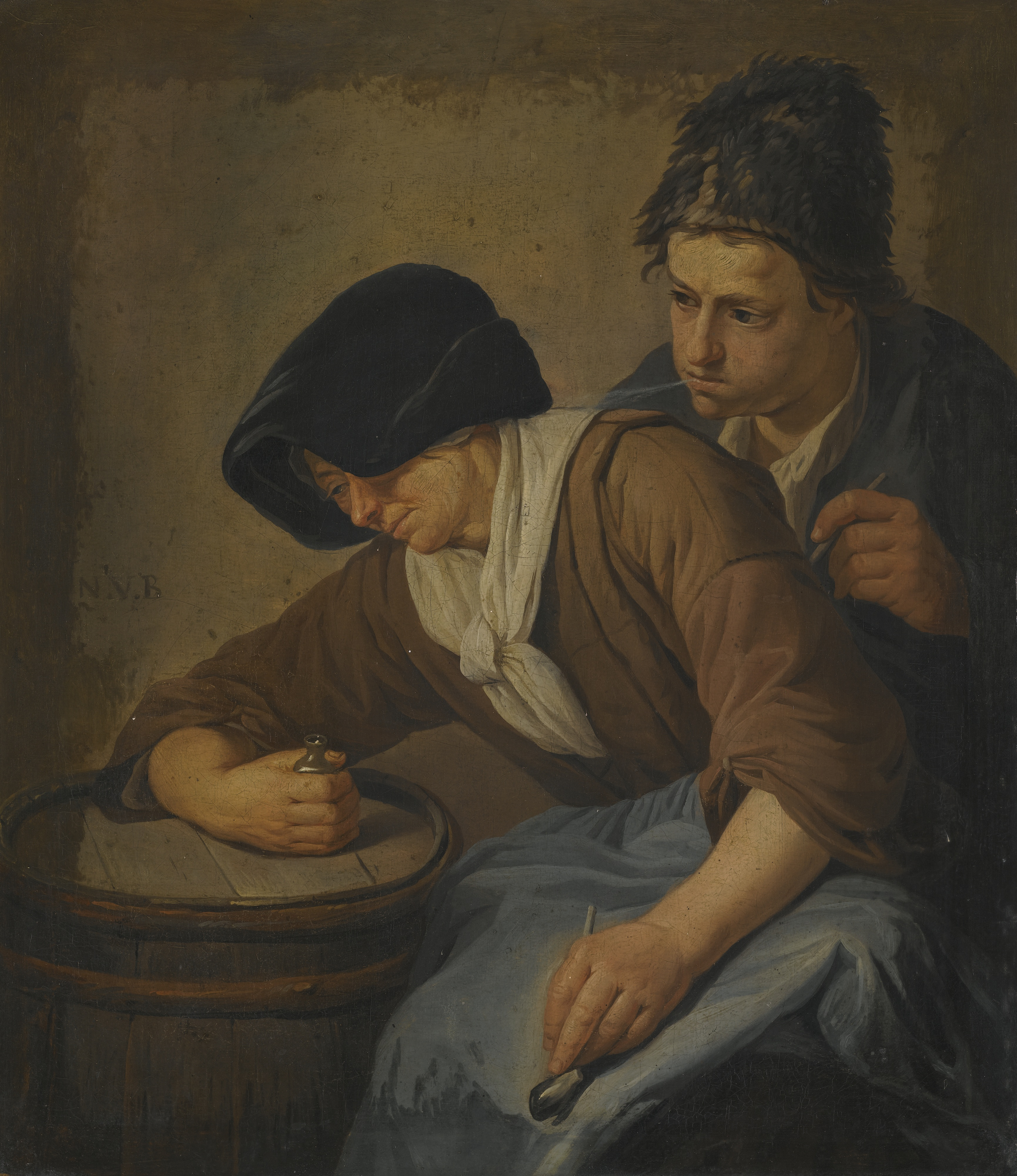
Man and a woman smoking in an interior

Norbert van Bloemen mainly painted genre scenes and Italianizing landscapes, which stylistically are close to those of his older brother Pieter who was also his teacher. He also made occasional history paintings, including for the clandestine Catholic churches in Holland and a number of portraits such as that of Portrait of Jan Pietersz Zomer, an art dealer in Amsterdam (Rijksmuseum, Amsterdam).

Norbert never seems to have been able to achieve the same level of success as his prolific brothers Pieter and Jan Frans whose works were highly prized during their lifetime and can now be found in prestigious international collections. It is believed he left Rome and Italy because of a lack of success in those cities.
