= Walter Julius Bloem =

German author

- Born: 22 October 1898; Barmen
- Disappeared: May 1945 (aged 46); Berlin, Nazi Germany
- Occupations: Writer, Waffen-SS soldier

Walter Julius Bloem (October 22, 1898 – presumed dead 1945) was a German writer who became known under the pseudonym Kilian Koll. Bloem was an officer in the First and Second World War as well as a member of the SS.

== Life ==
Bloem was born in 1898 in Barmen, in present-day North Rhine-Westphalia, Germany, as the son of the writer Walter Bloem, noted as an author of patriotic novels, and his first wife Margarete Kalähne. His father e.g. wrote the memoir "The Advance from Mons 1914"—the translation included a foreword by James Edward Edmonds who called it "one of the most graphic and dramatic accounts of the war yet written."

Since his earliest youth, Bloem suffered from irreparable hearing damage. Nevertheless, in 1915, at the age of 16, he volunteered for service in the First World War at the front, after he had fulfilled his father's demand that he complete his Oberprima (roughly advanced secondary school in the US) at Easter 1915. In the war, he was decorated several times including the Iron Cross, first and second classes, and at the end of the war, he was lieutenant and company commander on the Western Front. He was wounded several times, and his hearing damage had worsened so much that he was almost deaf. After the war, he fought until 1919 in the Freikorps in Poznań against Polish paramilitaries.

Back in civilian life, he studied philosophy and was awarded a Doctorate of Philosophy. After several trips through Germany and Western Europe, he finally settled with his wife as a settler in Nikolaiken, East Prussia.

Bloem began writing novels and poetry. His concentration was, among other things, the new medium of film. Under the title Die Seele des Lichtspiels - Ein Bekenntnis zum Film (The Soul of the Moving Picture - an Avowal of Film), he produced a work in 1922 which is still recognized today by film theorists. In order to distance himself from his famous father, he wrote under the pseudonym Kilian Koll.

In addition, he discovered the love of soaring.

In 1933, Bloem welcomed the seizure of power (Machtergreifung) by Adolf Hitler and saw him as the savior of Germany. In his works Bloem glorified National Socialist ideas.

Despite his severe disability, he succeeded in joining the Luftwaffe as an officer in 1938. During the Second World War, he flew missions with the "Boelcke" squadron (Kampfgeschwader 27) in the war against Poland and France. He was shot down in May 1940, but was able to parachute to safety. After a short stint in French captivity, he returned to Germany.

He joined the Waffen-SS, where he last fought in May 1945 during Battle for Berlin enduring the battles in and around Berlin city. He is considered missing since then.

After the war, many of his works in the Soviet occupation zone were added to the "Liste der auszusondernden Literatur" (list of banned books).

== Works ==
- Die Seele des Lichtspiels - Ein Bekenntnis zum Film (1922)
- Tanz ums Licht (1925) (The Dance of Light)
- Das steinerne Feuer (1926) (The Fire of Stone)
- Stein wird Staub (1926) (Stone becomes Dust)
- Motorherz (1927) (Motorheart)
- Feuer im Norden (1929) (Fire in the North)
- Der Mann, der mit dieser Zeit fertig wird (1933) (The Man who will be Prepared for these Times)
- Heimkehr in die Mannschaft (1934) (Return to the Team)
- Luftpiraten - Ein heiterer Fliegerroman (1935) (Air Pirates, a humorous novel of flying)
- Urlaub auf Ehrenwort - Geschichten um den Krieg (1937) (Leave on Word of Honor)
- Andreas auf der Fahrt (1938) (Andreas on a Drive)
- Die Flügelschlepper - Tagebuch aus einer Segelfliegerschule (1938) (Wing Tugs - journal of a sailplane school)
- Festspiel zu Walter Bloems siebzigstem Geburtstag (1938) (Festival Piece for Walter Bloem's Seventieth Birthday)
- Der Birkenzweig - Lieder (1939) (The Birch Twig - songs)
- Die unsichtbare Fahne (1939) (The Invisible Banner)

The short story "Urlaub auf Ehrenwort" was filmed twice: once in 1937 under the direction of Karl Ritter, featuring René Deltgen, Berta Drews, Carl Raddatz, and Paul Dahlke. A remake was made in 1955, directed by Wolfgang Liebeneiner, featuring, among others, Claus Biederstaedt and Paul Esser.
