= Nico Bloem =

German politician (born 1994)

Member of the Landtag of Lower Saxony
- Incumbent
- Assumed office 8 November 2022

Personal details
- Born: 2 June 1994 (age 31)
- Party: Social Democratic Party (since 2013)

Nico Bloem (born 2 June 1994) is a German politician serving as a member of the Landtag of Lower Saxony since 2022. He has served as first deputy mayor of Weener since 2021. He is also member of the IG Metall.
