= Charles Klein (director) =

German film director

- Born: 28 January 1898; Andernach, German Empire
- Died: February 1981 (aged 83); Andernach, West Germany
- Occupations: Film director, writer
- Years active: 1928-1940 (film)

Charles Klein (1898–1981) was a German film director, screenwriter and novelist. He began his career in Hollywood during the silent era. In 1928 he produced The Telltale Heart, an expressionist short film version of the Edgar Allan Poe story. He later moved to Germany, but the Second World War brought an end to his film career and he was called up to the Wehrmacht.

== Selected filmography ==
- Blindfold (1928)
- Pleasure Crazed (1928)
- The Telltale Heart (1928, short)
- The Sin Sister (1929)
- When the Village Music Plays on Sunday Nights (1933)
- Gypsy Blood (1934)
- Urlaub auf Ehrenwort (1938)
- The Fourth Is Not Coming (1939)
- Woman Without a Past (1939)
- Her Private Secretary (1940)

== Bibliography ==
- Brill, Olaf (ed.) Expressionism in the Cinema. Edinburgh University Press, 2016.
- Giesen, Rolf. Nazi Propaganda Films: A History and Filmography. McFarland & Company, 2003.
