= Walter Bloem =

German author

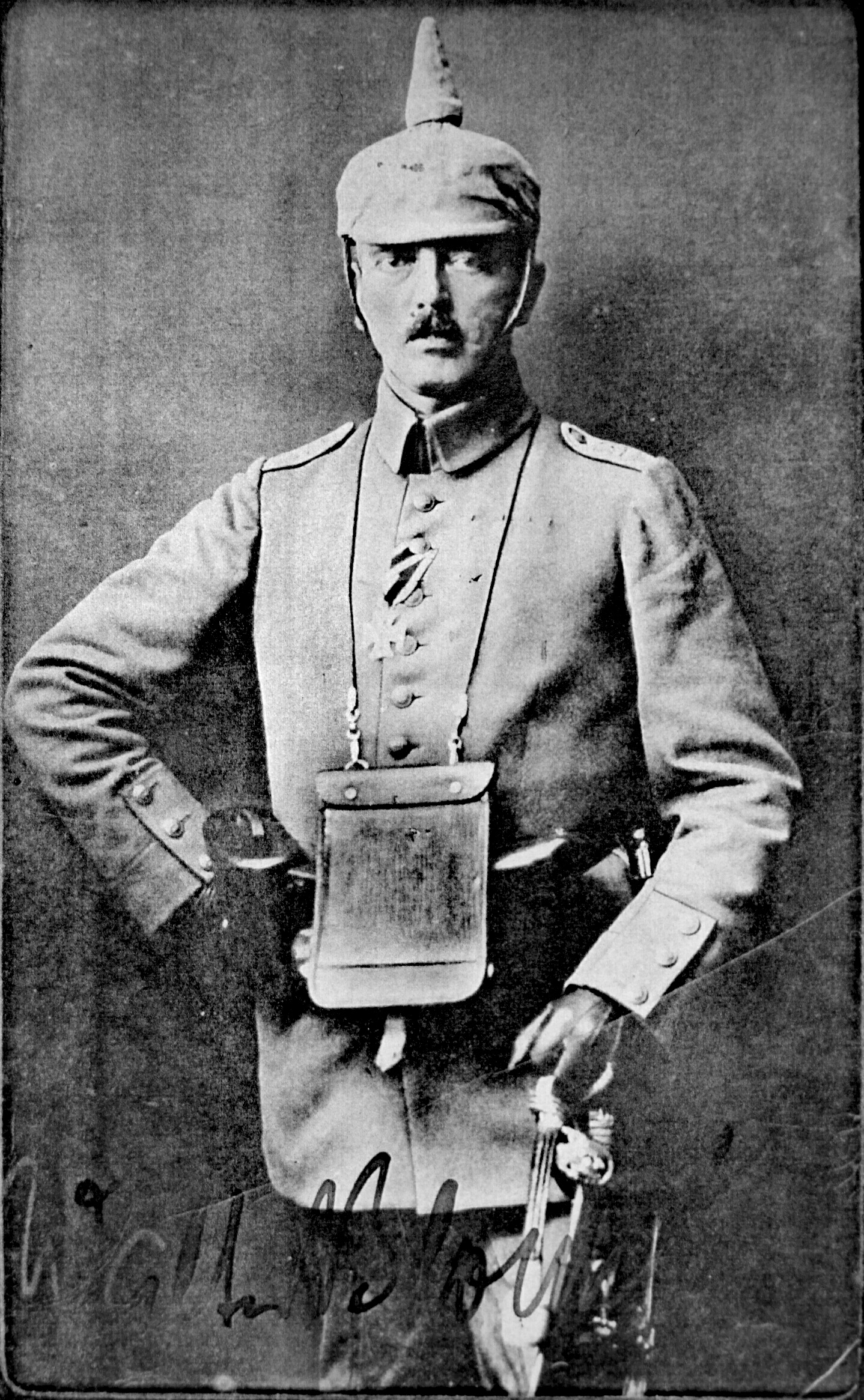
Walter Bloem

Walter Julius Gustav Bloem (20 June 1868 – 19 August 1951) was a German writer. He wrote novels that expressed a German nationalist attitude and made him one of the most widely read authors of his time with a total circulation of two million.

== Life ==
Born in Elberfeld, Walter Bloem was the eldest of five sons of the Privy Councilor, lawyer and notary Julius Bloem and his wife Maria Helene née Hermes.

From the marriage concluded in 1896 with Margarete born. Kalähne, the daughter Margareta (Eta, * 19 August 1897) and the son Walter Julius Bloem emerged. In his second marriage, he was married to his cousin Judith Bloem since 1923. Eta later married the Swiss journalist and Turkologist Max Rudolf Kaufmann (himself an opponent of German militarism and National Socialism, who lived in the US and Switzerland from 1925 to 1952).

=== Until 1914 ===
After graduating from Wilhelm-Dörpfeld-Gymnasium Bloem began to study Jurisprudence at Ruprecht-Karls-Universität Heidelberg and Philipps-Universität Marburg. In 1887 he became active in the German Student Corps Teutonia of Marburg. As an inactive he moved to the University of Leipzig, where he joined the German Student Corps Lusatia of Leipzig in the Year of the Three Emperors. His Marburg time he processed in his first novel The Crass Fox (1906), in which he changed the name of his own corps Teutonia to Corps Cimbria, and that of the Corps Hasso-Nassovia to, Nassovia, though the names of Corps Guestphalia and Suevoborussia Marburg remained the same. He completed the last part of his studies at the Rheinische Friedrich-Wilhelms-Universität Bonn. He passed the Intern examination in 1890 and became Dr. iur. After the Assessor exam, he worked from 1895 as a lawyer in Barmen. Initially he was a writer and publisher of amusement literature. In 1904 he gave up his practice as a lawyer and moved as a freelance writer to Berlin. There he was also active as a dramaturge at the New Theater. In 1912, his Trilogy appeared on the Franco-Prussian War ( The Iron Year , People Against People , The Forge of the Future ), which made him famous throughout Germany. He became one of the favorite authors of the German Emperor Wilhelm II, who awarded him the Red Eagle Order 4th grade for this trilogy. From 1911 to 1914 he lived in Stuttgart, where he worked as director and chief dramaturge at Hoftheater Stuttgart. Shortly before the outbreak of war, however, he abandoned this position in order to devote himself entirely to writing.

He died in Lübeck on 19 August 1951.

== Works ==
- Advance from Mons 1914: The Experiences of a German Infantry Officer, Helion & Company Limited, 2004. By Walter Bloem, Captain, 12th Brandenburg Grenadiers. Translated from the German by G.C. Wynne. Foreword by Brigadier-General Sir James Edward Edmonds, CB, CMG.
