= Gabriele Ricciardelli =

Italian Baroque painter

Gabriele Ricciardelli (flourished 1743– c. 1782), was an Italian painter of the Baroque period, active mainly in depicting landscapes.

== Biography ==
He was born in Naples to an engraver and landscape painter, Giuseppe Ricciardelli. He trained under Nicola Bonito in Naples, but then moved to Rome to train under Jan Frans van Bloemen, (also known as Orizzonte), where he encountered the work of Gaspard Poussin and Claude Lorrain. Grossi cites his death circa 1760.

He was active and popular in Naples in the court of Charles of Bourbon, employed at Portici and he provided them with several over-doors ('sopraporte') pictures for Naples' Palazzo Reale. He specialized in seascapes, and landscapes (vedute). One institution described his work thus: His Irish scenes being distinguished by his excellently accurate portrayal of architectural features.

An auction cataloguer described him thus: Ricciardelli was exceptional among the Neapolitan view painters in that he spent part of his career in Ireland (Dublin 1753-1759) and England (1777). His four vedute of Naples, engraved by Antonio Cardon in 1765, found great success with the English nobility.

When in Dublin, c. 1753, his patrons included Ralph Howard, 2nd Viscount Wicklow, four of his views of Naples were in the Shelton Abbey sale of 1950; Thomas Dawson, Lord Dartrey; and Dublin's Rotunda Hospital, for which an unfinished commission. The dating of the Drogheda pair is based on the inclusion of St. Peter's Church of Ireland, which was rebuilt to a Palladian design from 1748 and re-consecrated, on 22 September 1752.

== Gallery ==
Paintings in Highlanes Gallery, Drogheda, County Louth, Ireland

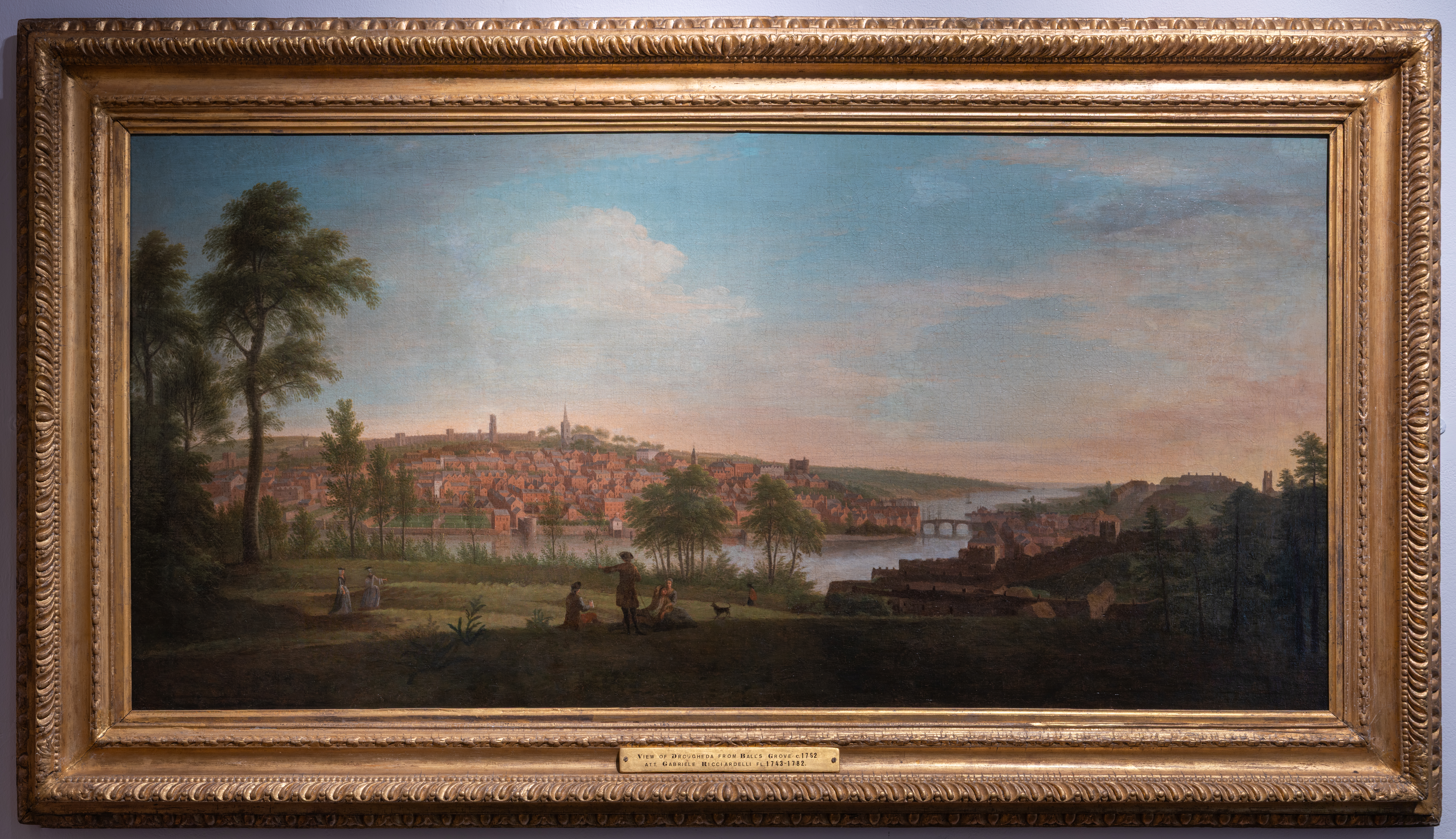
View of Drogheda from Ballsgrove, oil-on-canvas, 71 cm (28.0 in) × 151 cm (59.4 in).

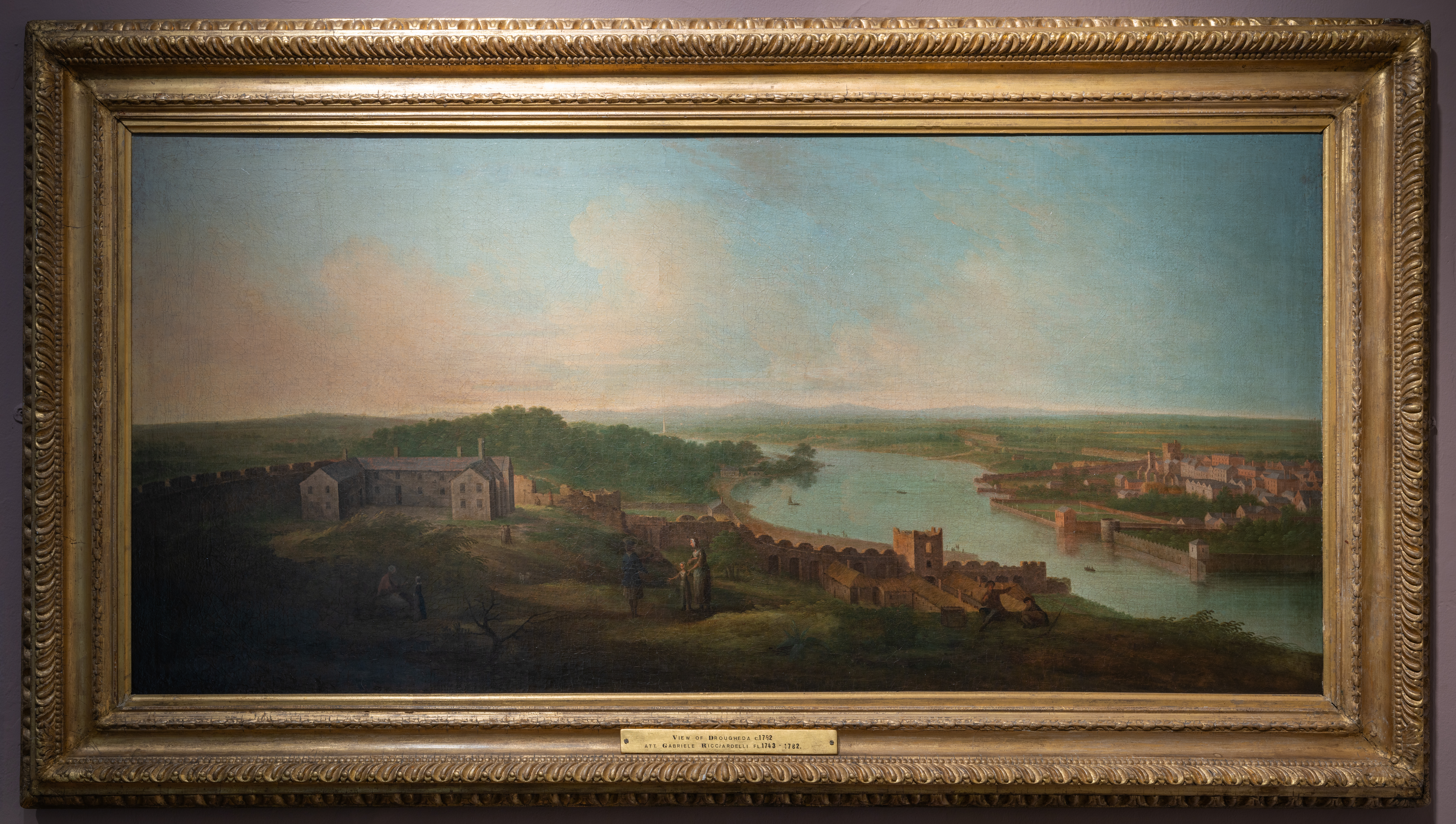
View of Drogheda from Millmount, oil-on-canvas, 71 cm (28.0 in) × 151 cm (59.4 in).
