= Pieter van Bloemen =

Flemish painter (1657–1720)

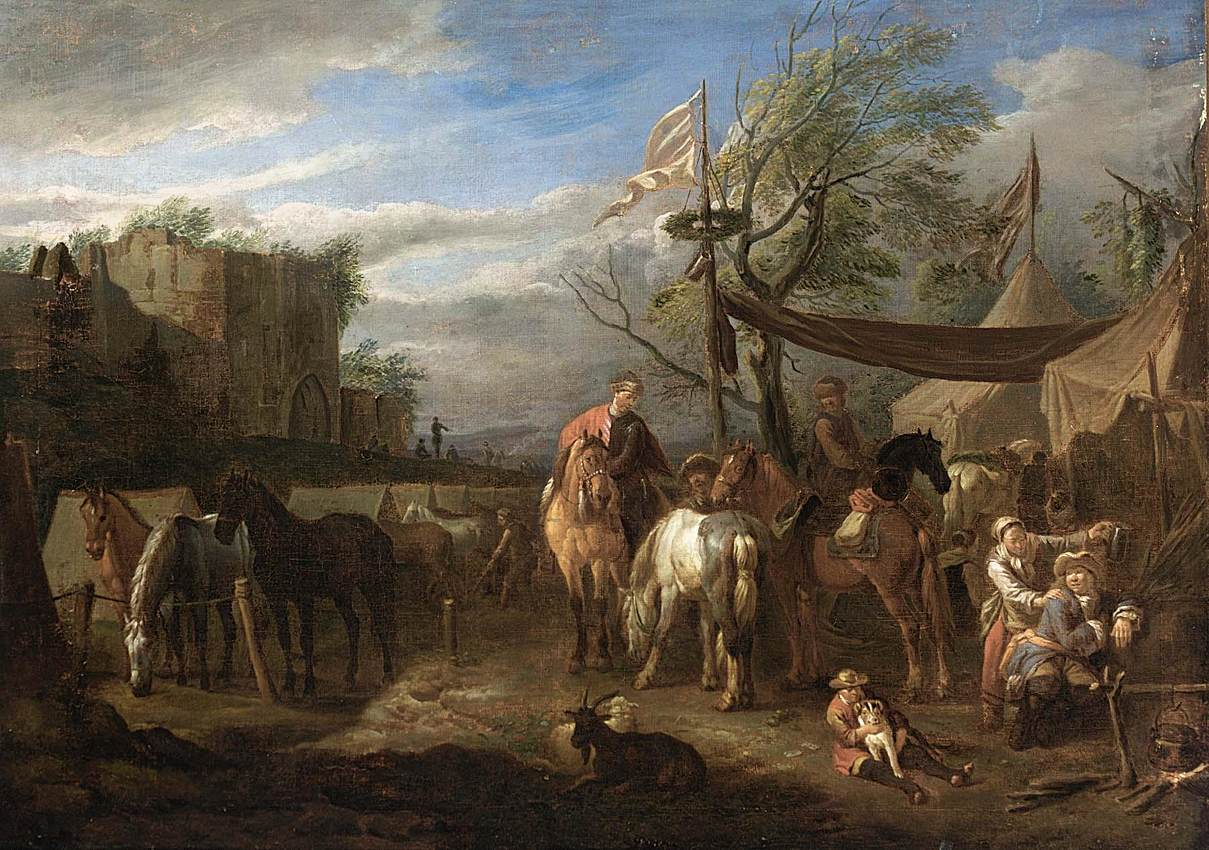
Riders resting at a military encampment

Pieter van Bloemen, also known as Standaart (bapt. 17 January 1657 – 6 March 1720), first name also spelled Peter or Peeter, was a Flemish painter, draughtsman and printmaker. He was a gifted landscape and animal artist and was very successful with his compositions depicting Italian landscapes with figures, equestrian battles, animals and genre and market scenes.

== Life ==
Van Bloemen was born in Antwerp. He was a pupil of Simon Johannes van Douw, according to some historians already from the age of 10. He became a master of the local Guild of Saint Luke in 1674 at the age of 17. He had two younger brothers who were also painters: Jan Frans and Norbert. At some point he travelled to Rome. This possibly happened in the year 1674 or later in the year 1689. He was in 1684 in Lyon in the company of the Dutch painters Adriaen van der Cabel and of Gillis Weenix. His brother Jan Frans joined him in Lyon.

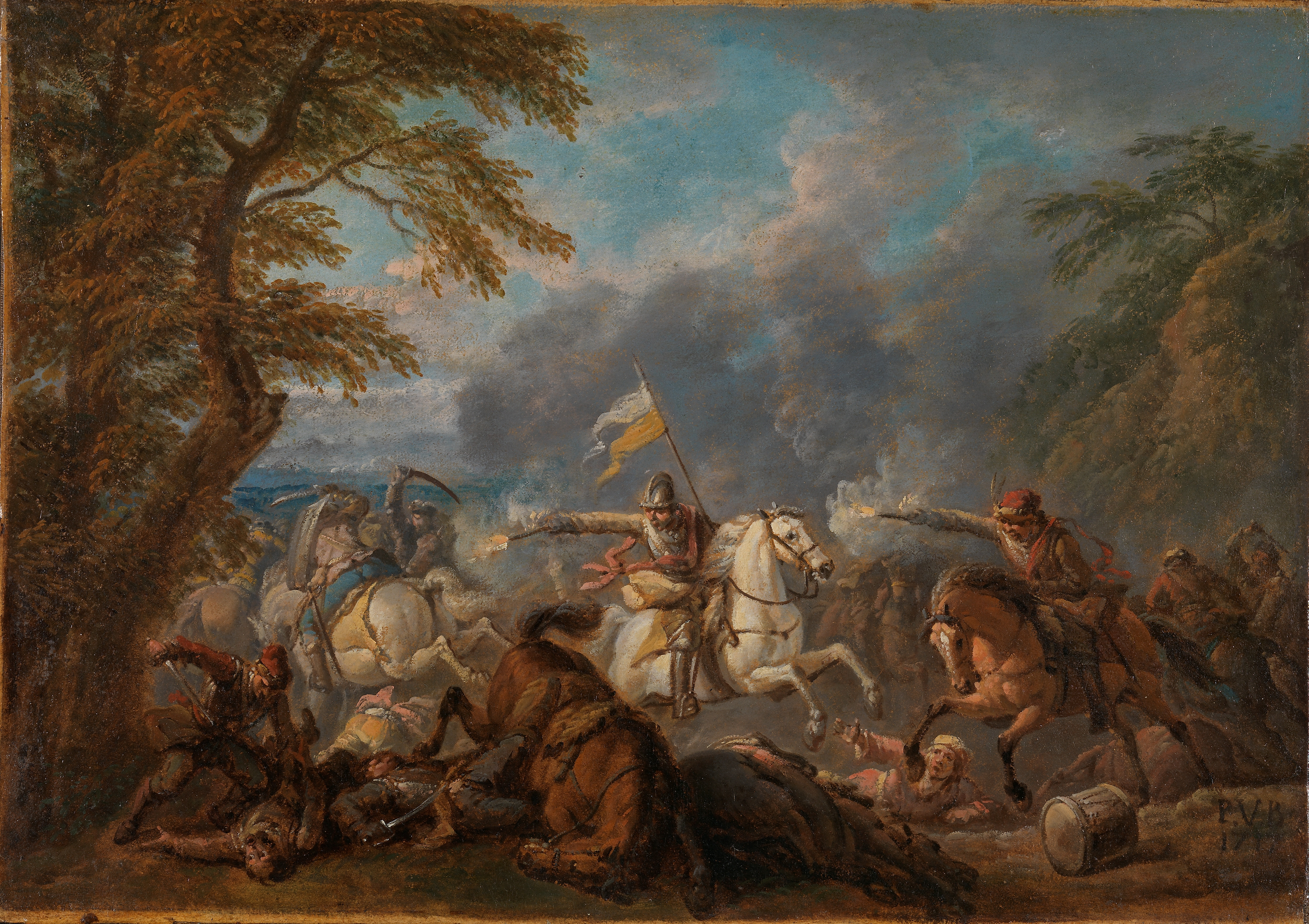
Cavalry battle

Via Turin, Pieter and Jan Frans travelled on to Rome where in 1688 they were registered in the parish of Sant’Andrea delle Fratte. In 1690 their third painting brother Norbert joined them in Rome as well. Pieter and Jan Frans made a few trips to Naples, Sicily and Malta. Pieter and Jan Frans also collaborated on works, with Pieter taking on the role of figure painter and Jan Frans painting the landscape (vedute).

Pieter became a member of the Bentvueghels, an association of mainly Dutch and Flemish artists active in Rome. It was common practice in the Bentvueghels to give each member a nickname, the so-called "bent name". Pieter's bent name was "Standaart" or in Italian "Standardo". It is believed he was given this nickname in reference to the standards and banners that he regularly painted in his military subjects.

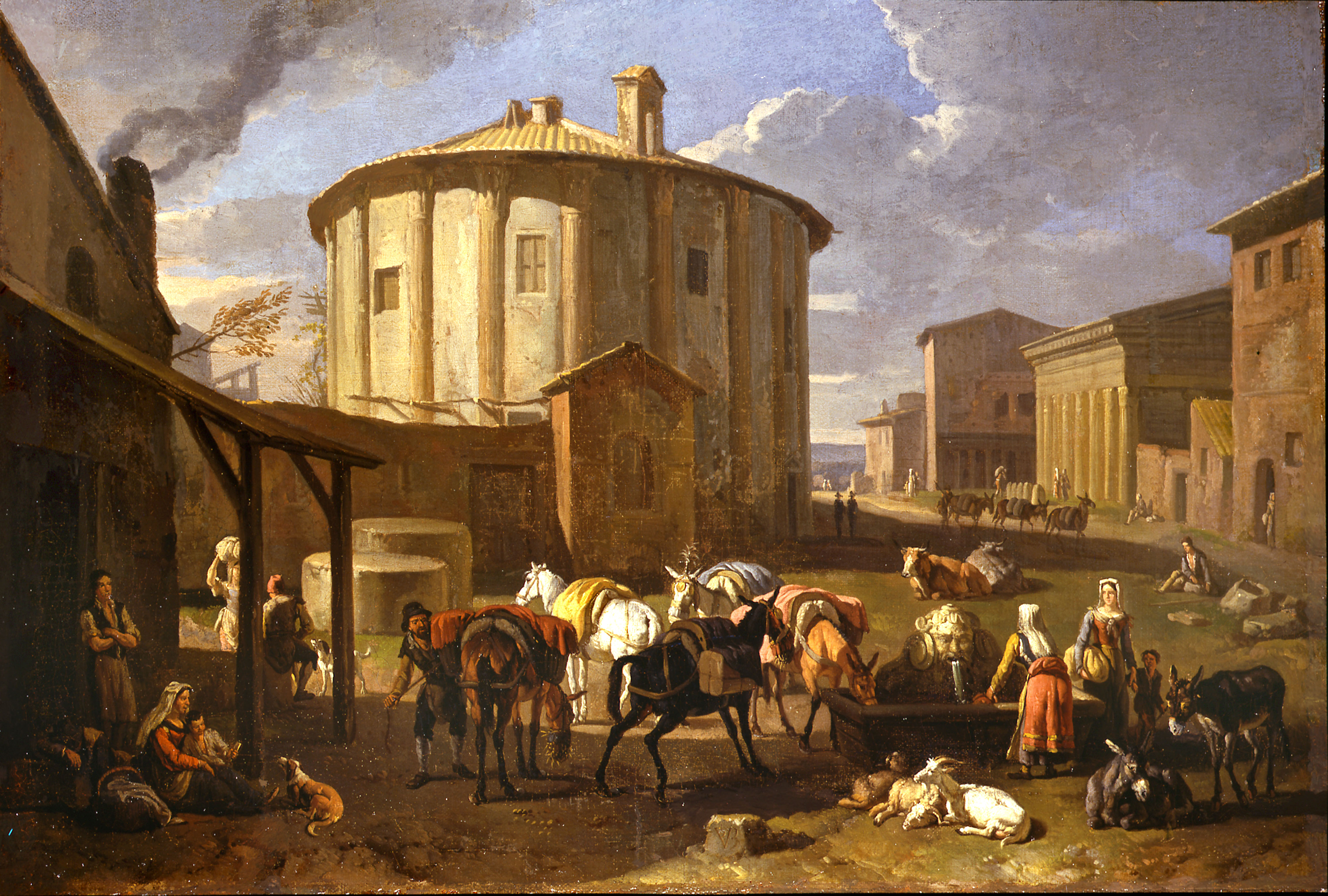
The Temple of Vesta

Pieter returned to Antwerp in 1694 and Norbert left for Amsterdam before 1724, while Jan Frans remained in Rome for the rest of his life.

Pieter became dean of the Guild of Saint Luke of Antwerp in 1699.

He was the teacher of his younger brothers Jan Frans and Norbert as well as of Peeter van Aken and Frans van Alter.

He died in Antwerp.

== Work ==
A prolific painter, van Bloemen was at his best painting animals, although he also produced a wide range of landscape, genre, animal, battle, military camp and history scenes. He carried on the tradition of Italianizing landscape paintings of the Roman Campagna representing inns, ruins and animals. A portion of his output paintings also stand in the tradition of the 'bamboccianti', a group of mainly Dutch and Flemish artists active in Rome whose small works depicted trivial or base subjects.

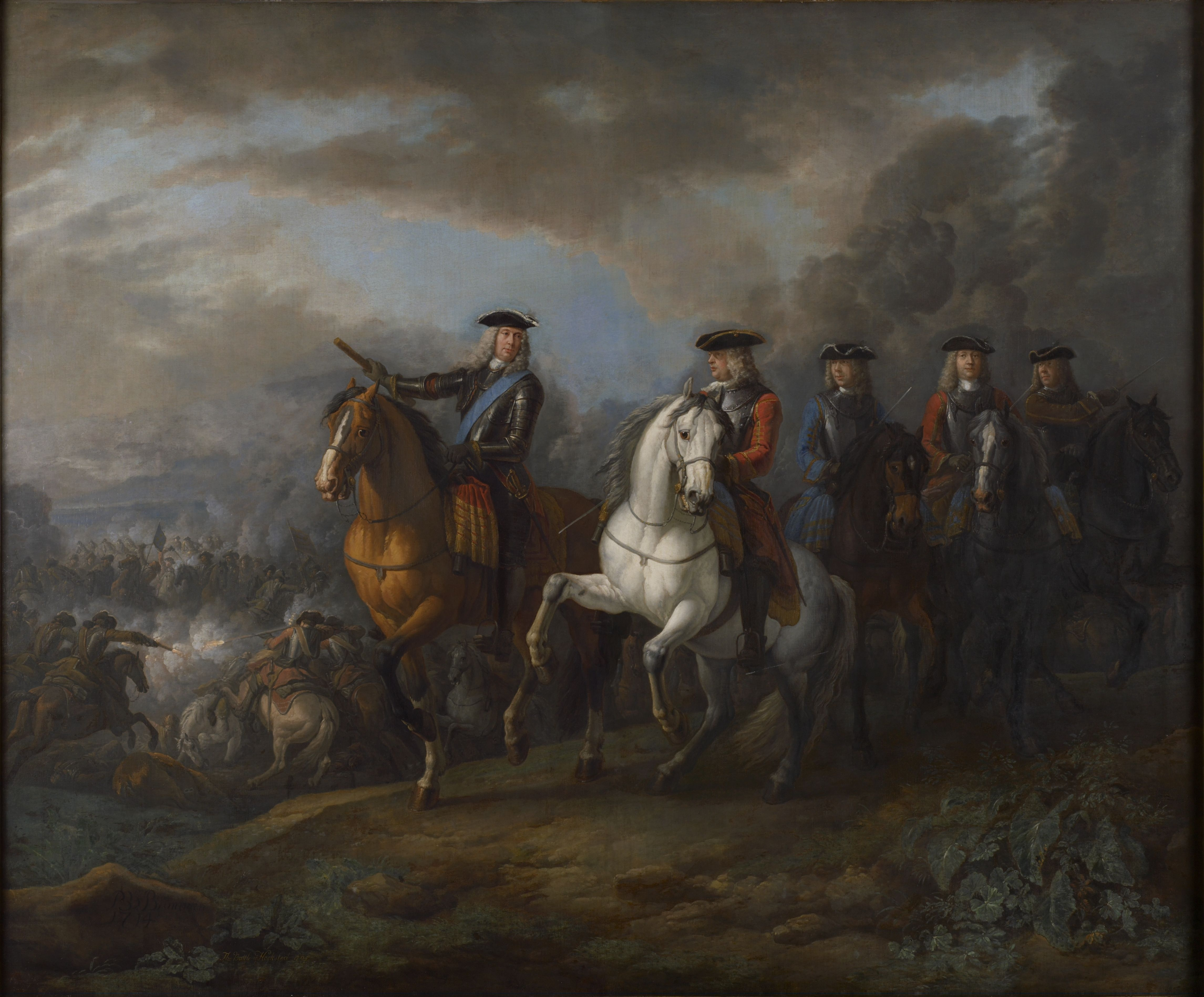
The Duke of Marlborough and the Earl of Cadogan at the battle of Blenheim

He was particularly known for his representations of groups of animals, which he typically placed in the foreground of his compositions and therefore appear as his main centre of interest. Particular features of his style were his depiction of groups of animals as ‘still-lifes’ in open, Italianate landscapes containing some ancient monuments to convey the ‘Roman’ atmosphere and the use of lively colouring in the figures’ costumes so as to contrast with the more sombre greys and browns of the herds and ruins.

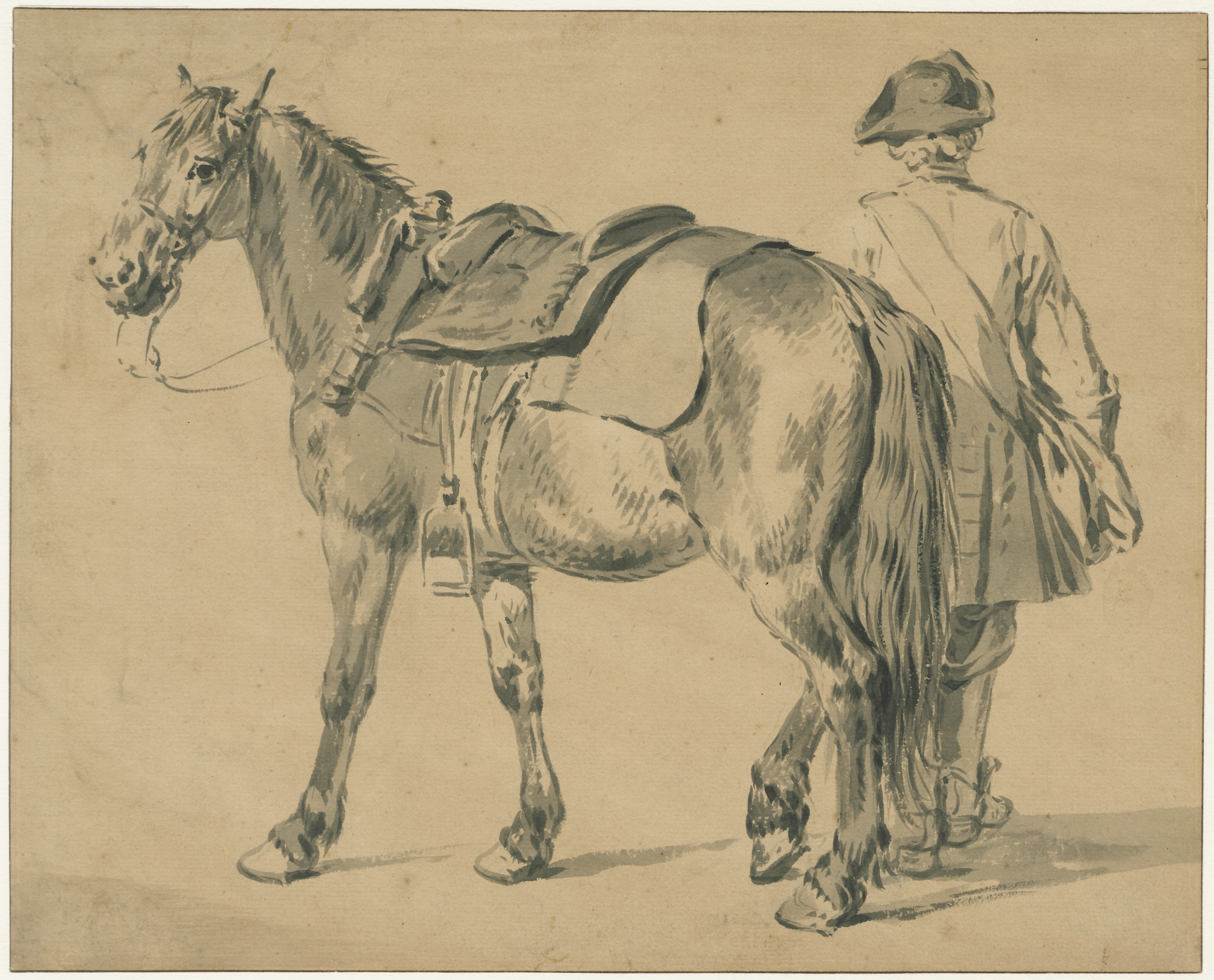
A horse and a horseman

Because of his particular skill in the painting of horses, he was frequently invited to collaborate on the compositions of other local artists. An example is his cooperation with Balthasar van den Bossche on a portrait including a battle scene made for the Duke of Marlborough when he visited Antwerp after the Battle of Ramillies in 1706. Van den Bossche painted the portrait while Pieter van Bloemen painted the horses. The work is now only known through the copy painted by Pieter van Bloemen on his own. He collaborated with figure or landscape painters such as the Italian vedute painter Niccolò Codazzi.

He made many drawings of landscapes and figure and animal studies from life. He further created a number of prints on the same themes.
