= Urlaub auf Ehrenwort (1938 film) =

- Theatrical release poster by Paul Aigner
- Directed by: Karl Ritter
- Screenplay by: Charles Klein, Felix Lützkendorf (from ideas by Kilian Koll (Walter Julius Bloem, Jr.) and Charles Klein)
- Based on: Urlaub auf Ehrenwort by Kilian Koll (Walter Julius Bloem, Jr.)
- Produced by: Karl Ritter
- Starring: Rolf Moebius; Fritz Kampers; René Deltgen; Otto Graf
- Cinematography: Günther Anders
- Edited by: Gottfried Ritter
- Music by: Ernst Erich Buder
- Production company: UFA
- Release date: 11 January 1938 (Cologne)
- Running time: 87 mins
- Country: Germany
- Language: German
- Budget: 598,000 RM

Urlaub auf Ehrenwort (variously translated as Leave on Word of Honour, Holiday on Parole, Furlough on Parole, Leave on Parole and Pass on a Promise) is a 1938 propaganda film directed by Karl Ritter, the last of three films set in the First World War which he made during the period when Nazi Germany was rearming.

== Plot summary ==
Based on the autobiographical novella of the same title by Kilian Koll, the film is set late in 1918, during the final stages of the First World War. A troop of German infantry are on their way from the Eastern to the Western Front and need to change trains in Berlin. After marching through the centre of the city between the two railway stations, they must wait several hours for their connecting train. The major in command gives strict orders that no one must go into this city full of "deserters, revolutionaries, and defeatists", even though most of the men are from Berlin, but in response to the pleading of Private Hartmann, who had saved his life in the trenches, young Lieutenant Prätorius grants passes on the men's solemn promise to return in time: "I have your word of hono[u]r that you will return and fulfill your duty in this critical hour of the fatherland. The unit is counting on you—and so is Germany." The film follows several of the men, in particular four of different ages and from different social backgrounds. Infantryman Ullrich Hagen is a composer; he visits his music teacher, who will shortly be performing one of his works and begs him to be true to his talent rather than throwing his life away in a futile cause. Private Hartmann, who is middle-aged, surprises his young wife, Anna, who has replaced him at his work driving a tram; she begs him to stay with her and their four children rather than returning to a war which is already lost. The third, a young man, after discovering his only relative has died, meets a girl and falls in love for the first time. The fourth, Infantryman Emil Sasse is a "leftist intellectual" who was cursing the notion of 'heroic death' and announcing his intention to desert in the opening scenes of the film; he finds his girlfriend Fritzi printing anti-war leaflets. All four, however, resist the temptation to desert. Hagen responds that his works can speak for themselves; the young man considers his companions closer to him than his new love; Sasse finds he no longer likes revolutionaries: "We soldiers are dying for our country while you drink, hold meetings, and make love. ... I have nothing in common with you any more." He fights his way out of the meeting and rejoins the unit with a black eye and bruises. Hartmann loses track of time, but his family all pile into a friend's lorry and race the train to the next station; the lieutenant spots the speeding vehicle and all the men are back as they promised.

David Stewart Hull, in his 1969 study of Nazi films, pointed out that the film greatly resembles Farewell Again, a British film directed by Tim Whelan which was made the same year.

== Partial cast list ==
- Ingeborg Theek as Inge, a nurse
- Fritz Kampers as Private Heini Hartmann, a tram driver
- Rolf Moebius as Lieutenant Walter Prätorius
- Berta Drews as Anna Hartmann
- René Deltgen as Infantryman Emil Sasse
- Heinz Welzel as recruit Jahnke
- Carl Raddatz as Infantryman Dr. Jens Kirchhoff (his début)
- Jakob Sinn as Infantryman Schmiedecke
- Ludwig Schmitz as Infantryman Ludwig Pichel
- Hans Reinhardt Knisch as recruit Kurt Hellwig
- Willi Rose as Infantryman Julius Krawutke, a barber
- Wilhelm König as Infantryman Ullrich Hagen, a composer
- Kurt Waitzmann as Infantryman Dr. Wegener
- Franz Weber as Non-Commissioned Officer Schnettelker
- Otz Tollen as Captain Falk
- Hadrian Maria Netto as First Lieutenant von Treskow-Dyrenfurth
- Heinrich Schroth as Lieutenant Colonel
- Käte Haack as Maria, a nurse
- Margot Erbst as Fritzi, Sasse's girlfriend
- Evi Eva as Dolores Schulze
- Iwa Wanja as Ilonka
- Ruth Störmer as Vera Georgi
- Otto Graf as Professor Knudsen, a sculptor
- Eduard Bornträger as Professor Hasenkamp
- Lotte Werkmeister as Infantryman Krawutke's mother
- Christine Grabe as Adelheid, Jahnke's girlfriend
- Ilse Fürstenberg as Mrs. Schmiedecke

== Soundtrack ==
The musical score, by Ernst Erich Buder, featured songs from the Great War and was unusually dramatic. The lyrics to the song "Die Liebe ist das Element des Lebens" are by Franz Baumann.

== Production and themes ==
Urlaub auf Ehrenwort was a Staatsauftragsfilm; it was commissioned by the Ministry of Propaganda. Shooting took place between late August and late October 1937, with interior scenes shot at the UFA studios in Neubabelsberg. It was the third of three 'soldier films' set in the First World War which Karl Ritter directed in 1936–37 while Nazi Germany was rearming in preparation for renewed war. Its theme is the importance of duty, even in the face of military futility, or as one character terms it, das verdammte Pflichtbewußtsein (that damned sense of duty). The film is a "morality play" which depicts the victory of comradeship and duty over various "forces of evil" afflicting Germany.

While the men are regarded overall in terms of community, the women are contrasted as good and bad and in terms of good and bad women's roles. Hartmann's wife and Krawutke's mother have taken their places in the workforce, but only by necessity: the barber Krawutke finishes shaving the customer while his mother goes to make tea, and when Hartmann surprises her, his wife almost crashes the tram. Prätorius' own girlfriend Inge (Ingeborg Theek) is a virtuous nurse and is contrasted with Fritzi and the other Communist women and with Vera Georgi the sculptress (Ruth Störmer), a self-centred career woman. Illustrating dangerous women, the Hungarian singer Ilonka (Iwa Wanja) seduces the 17-year-old recruit Hellwig (Hans Reinhardt Knisch). In this respect the film prefigures wartime films such as Wunschkonzert, having a secondary propaganda focus on wholesome and appropriate women's lives and relationships with men.

== Release ==
Urlaub auf Ehrenwort was first shown at the Ufa-Palast in Cologne on 11 January 1938, and then received a grand première at the Ufa-Palast am Zoo in Berlin on 19 January, where it was introduced by the Overture to Wagner's opera Rienzi, played by a Luftwaffe cadet orchestra. It was shown a few months later in New York, and in Philadelphia in April 1940 after the removal of bedroom scenes.

UFA promoted the film aggressively, calling it "a grand song of comradeship ... born in the storm of steel of the front, meeting its greatest test in the lunatic asylum of a sick, politically incited metropolis."

== Reception ==
The film was highly praised by the German press after the Berlin première, Ludwig Eberlein in the Berliner Morgenpost calling it "a major victory of German cinematic art", von Arndt in the Völkischer Beobachter "an overwhelming experience", Joachim Brenner in Das 12 Uhr Blatt "a meaningful turning point in the history of German film" and Albert Schneider in the cinema magazine Licht-Bild-Bühne "a great achievement of German cinematic creativity". It received the Prädikat (Propaganda Ministry award of distinction) of staatspolitisch und künstlerisch besonders wertvoll (particular political and artistic value) and was awarded a Special Recommendation at the 1938 Venice Film Festival. (Goebbels also presented Ritter with a silver-framed photograph of himself inscribed "in thankful recognition of his exemplary pioneering contribution to German film on the occasion of the great success of his film Urlaub auf Ehrenwort", with which the director later posed for press photographs.)

== Remake ==
Urlaub auf Ehrenwort was remade in 1955 by Wolfgang Liebeneiner, one of several de-politicised remakes of Nazi films by that director: Furlough on Word of Honor.
