= Jan Frans van Bloemen =

Flemish painter (1662–1749)

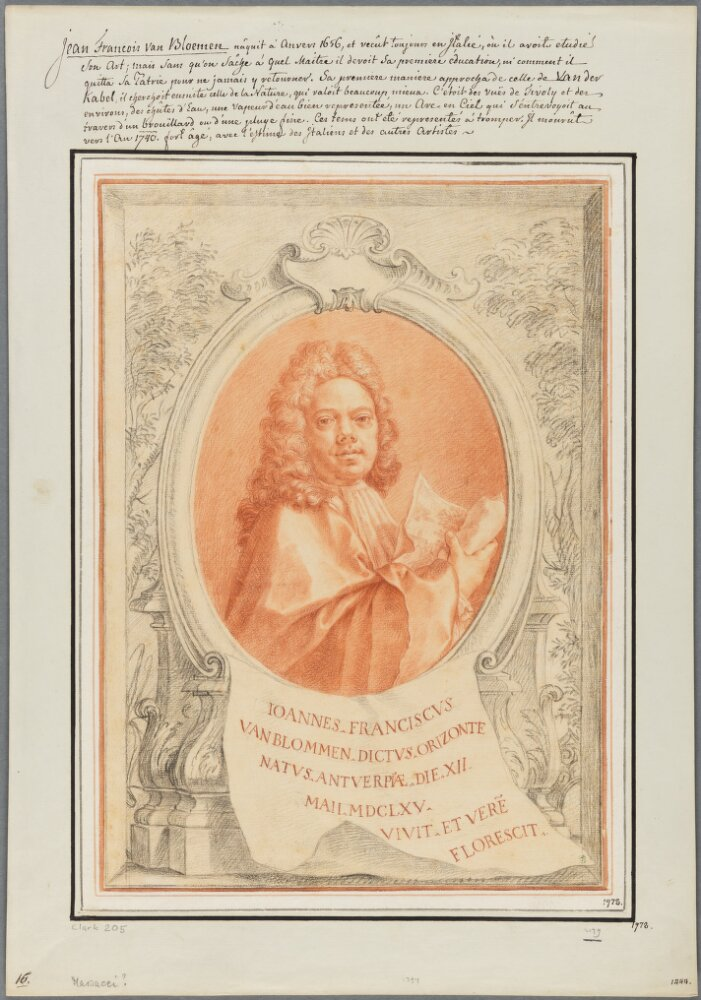
- Jan Frans van Bloemen, c. 1723
- Born: 12 May 1662; Antwerp, Belgium
- Died: 13 June 1749 (aged 87); Rome, Italy
- Other name: Orizzonte
- Known for: Painting
- Relatives: Pieter van Bloemen, Norbert van Bloemen

Jan Frans van Bloemen (baptized 12 May 1662 - buried 13 June 1749) was a Flemish landscape painter mainly active in Rome. Here he was able to establish himself as the leading painter of views (vedute) of the Roman countryside depicted in the aesthetic of the classical landscape tradition.

== Life ==
Born in Antwerp, Jan Frans van Bloemen was a younger brother of Pieter van Bloemen. He likely trained with his brother. Between 1681 and 1684, he was in his native Antwerp a pupil of Anton Goubau, a painter of market scenes and bamboccianti (low-life) subjects situated in Roman or Mediterranean settings.

He travelled to Paris around 1682 and resided there for a few years. He then moved to Lyon where his brother Pieter van Bloemen was staying. He probably met the painter Adriaen van der Kabel around this time. Via Turin, Jan Frans and Pieter van Bloemen travelled on to Rome where in 1688 they were registered in the parish of Sant’Andrea delle Fratte. In 1690 a third painting brother, Norbert van Bloemen (1670–1746), joined them as well. Whereas Pieter returned to Antwerp in 1694 and Norbert left for Amsterdam before 1724, Jan Frans remained in Rome for the rest of his life, except for a few trips to Naples, Sicily and Malta, which he undertook with his brother Pieter. The Dutch-born painter Caspar van Wittel, who lived in Rome since 1675, became the godfather of his first child.

Van Bloemen was successful in Rome and received commissions for the painting of large vedute from prominent patrons such as the Queen of Spain Elizabeth Farnese, the Roman nobility and the Pope.

He joined the Bentvueghels, the association of Dutch and Flemish artists in Rome, where he took the nickname Orizzonte or Horizonti. This nickname referred to the distance he painted in his landscapes. While van Bloemen was a much locally patronized painter, he was unable to gain acceptance into the pre-eminent Roman painter's guild, the Accademia di San Luca, until he was over 70 years old. Some of the resistance may have arisen from the Roman establishment's disdain for landscape painting as a demonstration of skill.

Among his pupils were Franz Ignaz Oefele, Gabrielle Ricciardelli, and Nicolò Bonito. He died in Rome in 1749.

== Work ==
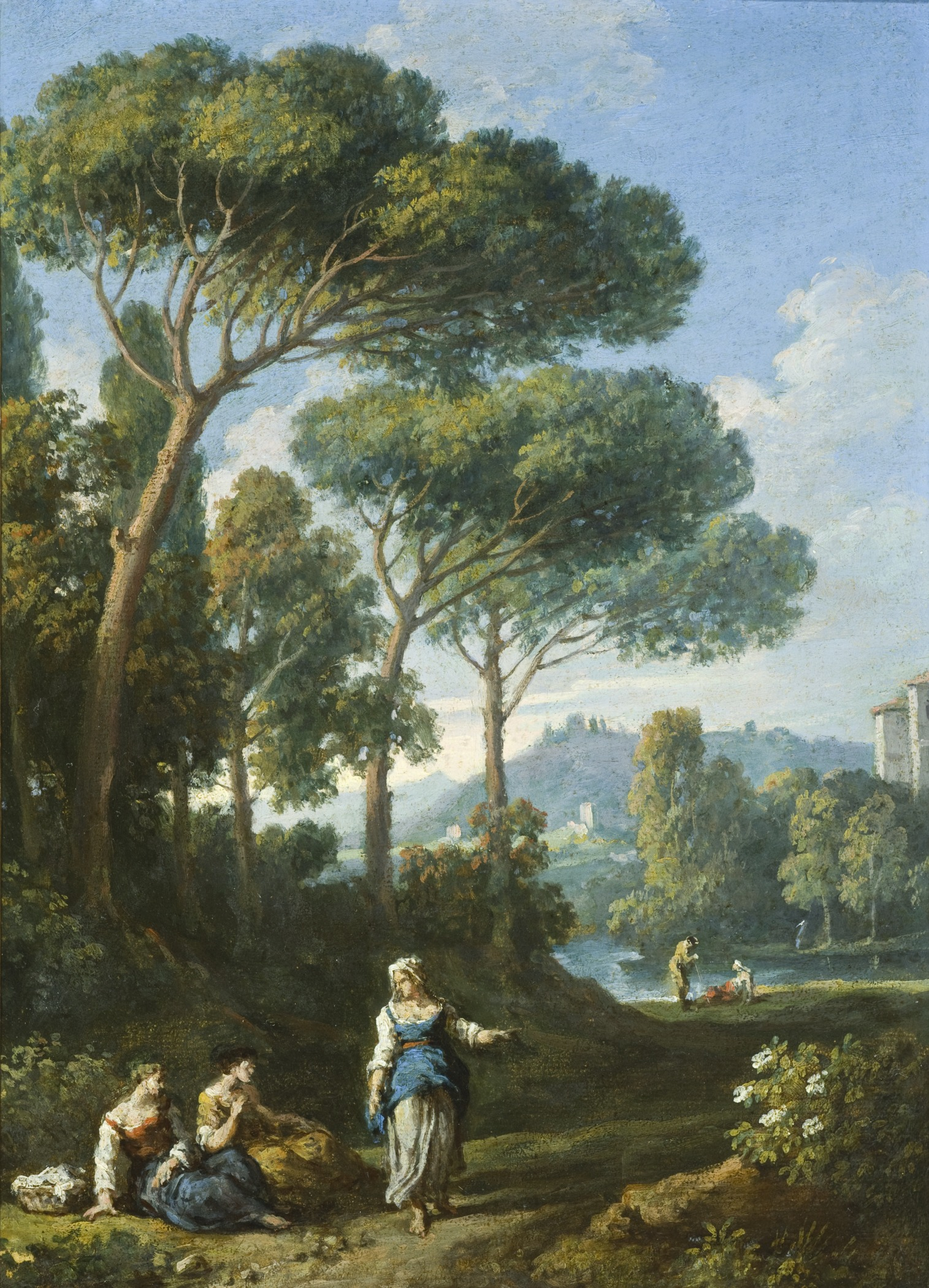
Roman Campagna with Figures Conversing

Van Bloemen predominantly painted classical landscapes, taking his inspiration from the Roman Campagna. His landscapes, with their recession through a series of planes, soft, warm lightning and classical and religious subject matter, drew on the examples of artists such as Claude Lorrain and Gaspard Dughet. Van Bloemen's paintings are exquisitely imbued with that "difficult-to-define pastoral ambience" which helped to make him such a great painter in the eyes of his contemporaries. His vedute fall into the category that combine reality with imaginary elements.

His landscapes have an Arcadian lushness, with mountains, streams, distant hamlets, and small inhabitants painted with imprecise pittura di tocco ('painting of touch') using small dotting and spirited brush-strokes. Unlike van Wittel, van Bloemen did not generally depict views of areas distant from Rome such as the Tiber Valley or the Alban hills. His subjects were limited to views in the immediate vicinity of Rome, an outline of which was typically visible in his compositions. Van Bloemen was in particular known for his 'estate views' representing the estates of the nobility in the Roman Campagna. His views aim to associate the modern estate view with the classical arcadian landscape. Rather than offering the wide panoramic views, distant horizon and atmospheric effects associated with topographical landscapes, van Bloemen's estate views emphasize minute observation of reality and a limited viewpoint. The estates are thus made to appear as immutable features of the local landscape.

He worked together with other painters who painted the figures in his landscapes such as Carlo Maratti, Placido Costanzi and Pompeo Batoni. However, he only relied on such collaboration with figure painters in the last decades of his life when he produced his most ambitious classicising compositions. Even then he only relied on these figure specialists for the most prominent figures in the foreground while he took care of the minor characters. In fact, van Bloemen was an accomplished staffage painter and he was very skilled at quickly learning to imitate the style of his collaborators. As a result, many of the figures in his paintings that are attributed to prestigious contemporaries were actually by his own hand. He collaborated most frequently with Placido Costanzi. He regarded the pair of paintings representing The Flight to Egypt and The Rest on the Flight to Egypt as his best collaboration with Placido Costanzi who painted the figures.

His landscape drawings, which often depict imaginary ruins, have been confused with those of his brother Pieter, who is better known for his drawings of figures and animals. Jan Frans van Bloemen also made pen drawings of buildings in and around Rome.

== Gallery ==
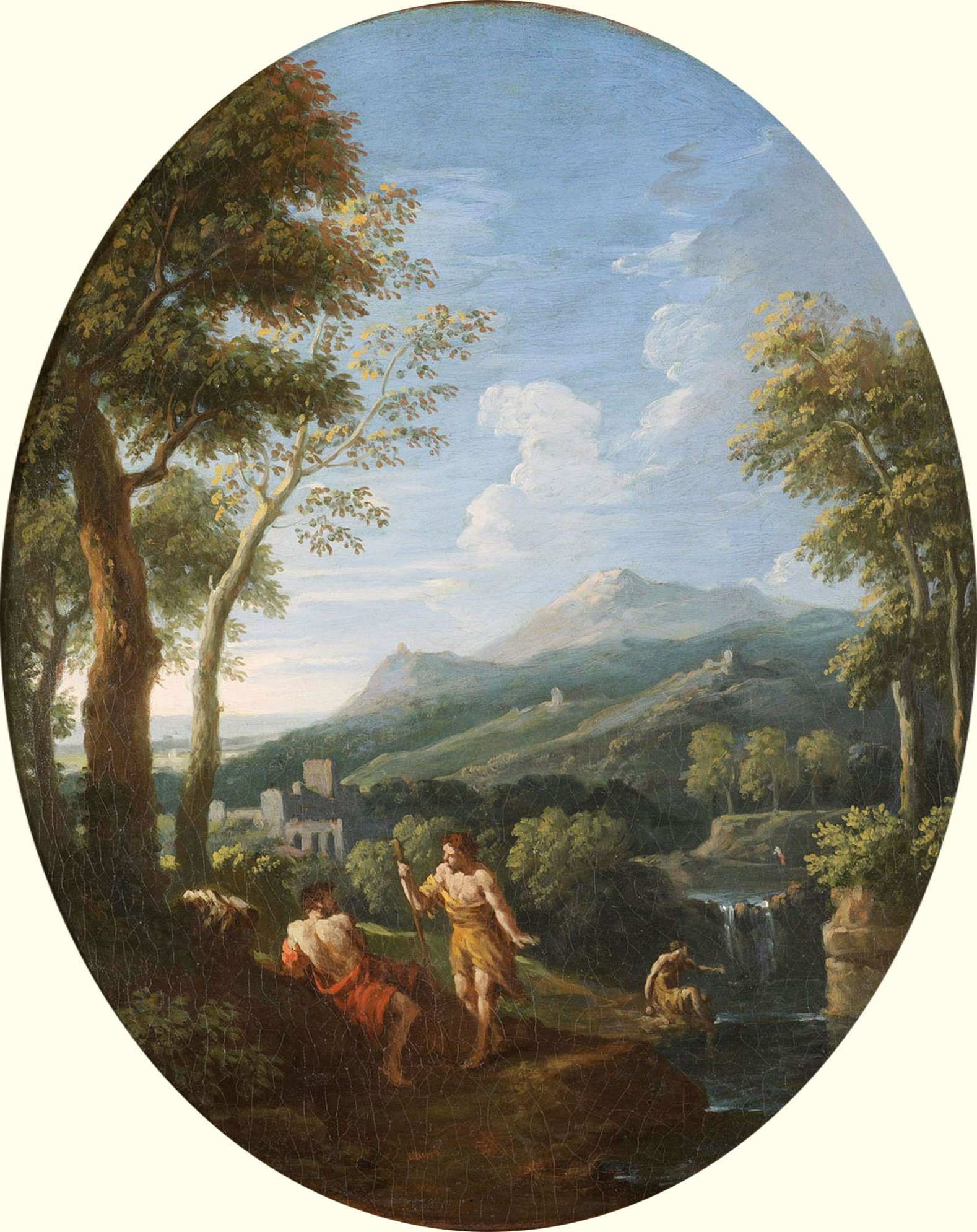
Italianate Landscape

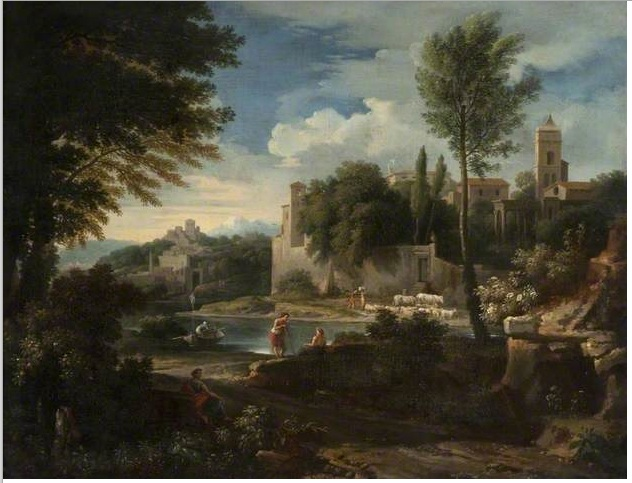
Landscape with a River and a Walled Town

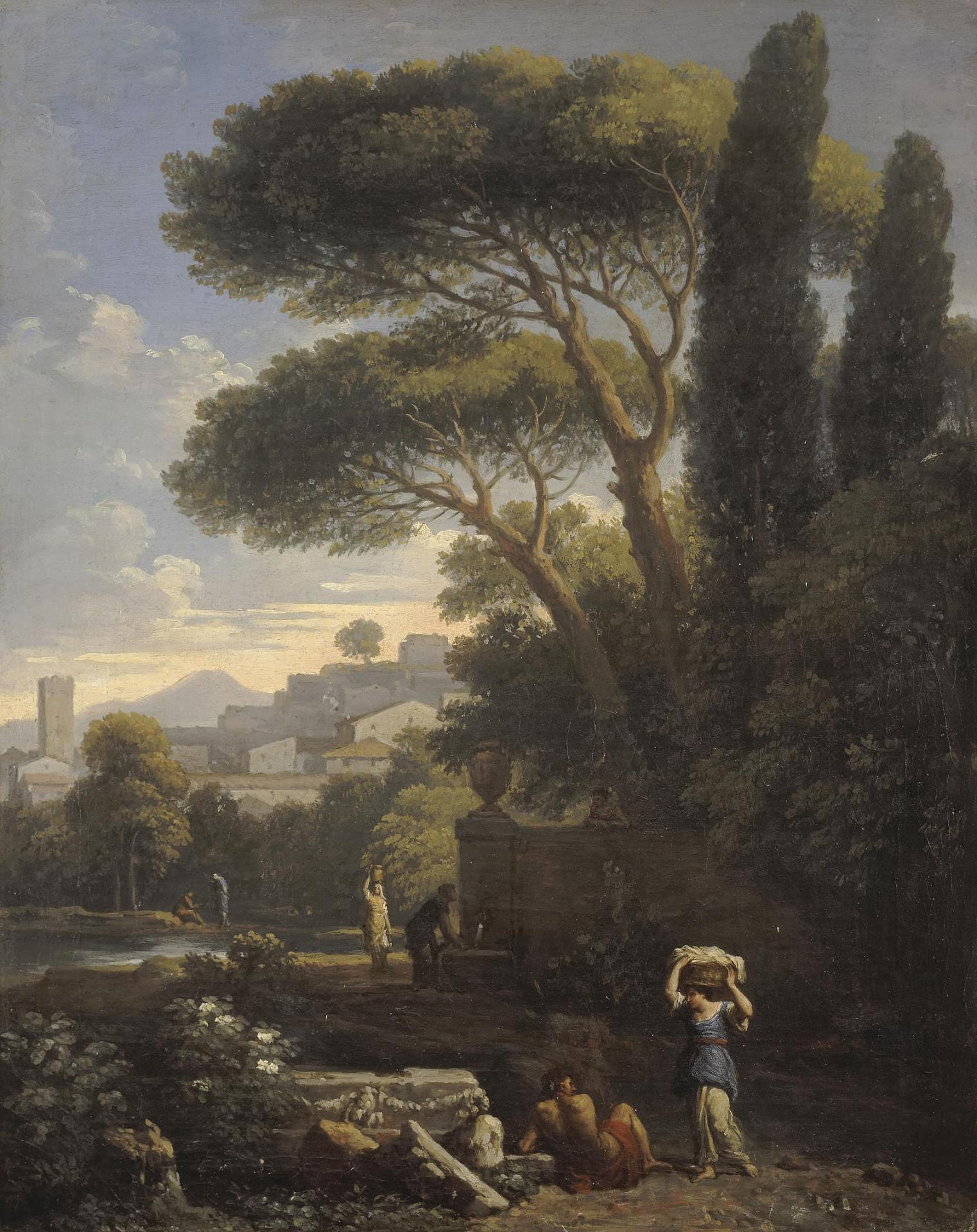
Landscape with a Fountain

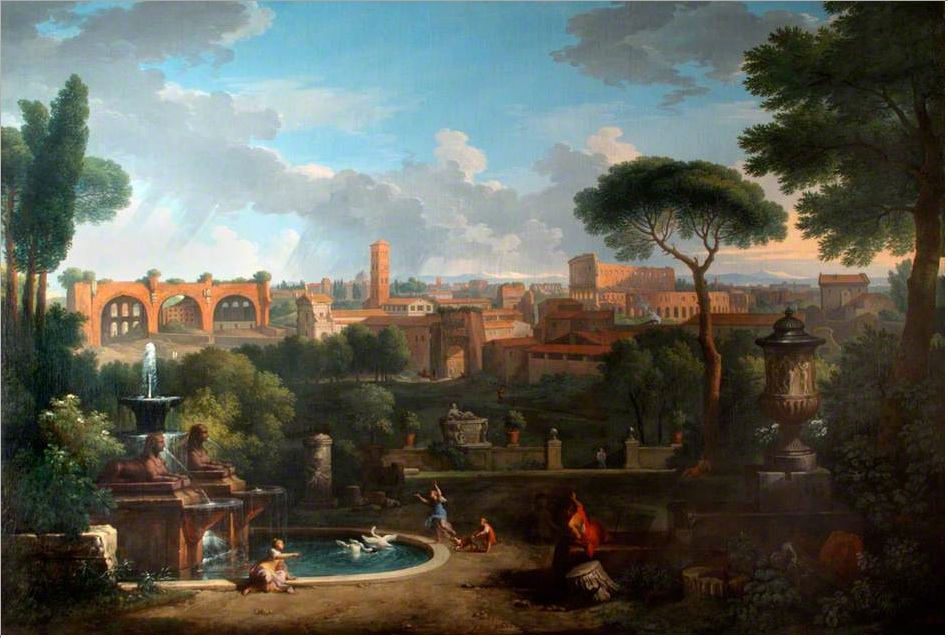
View of Rome from the Farnese Gardens on the Palatino
