= Lucy =

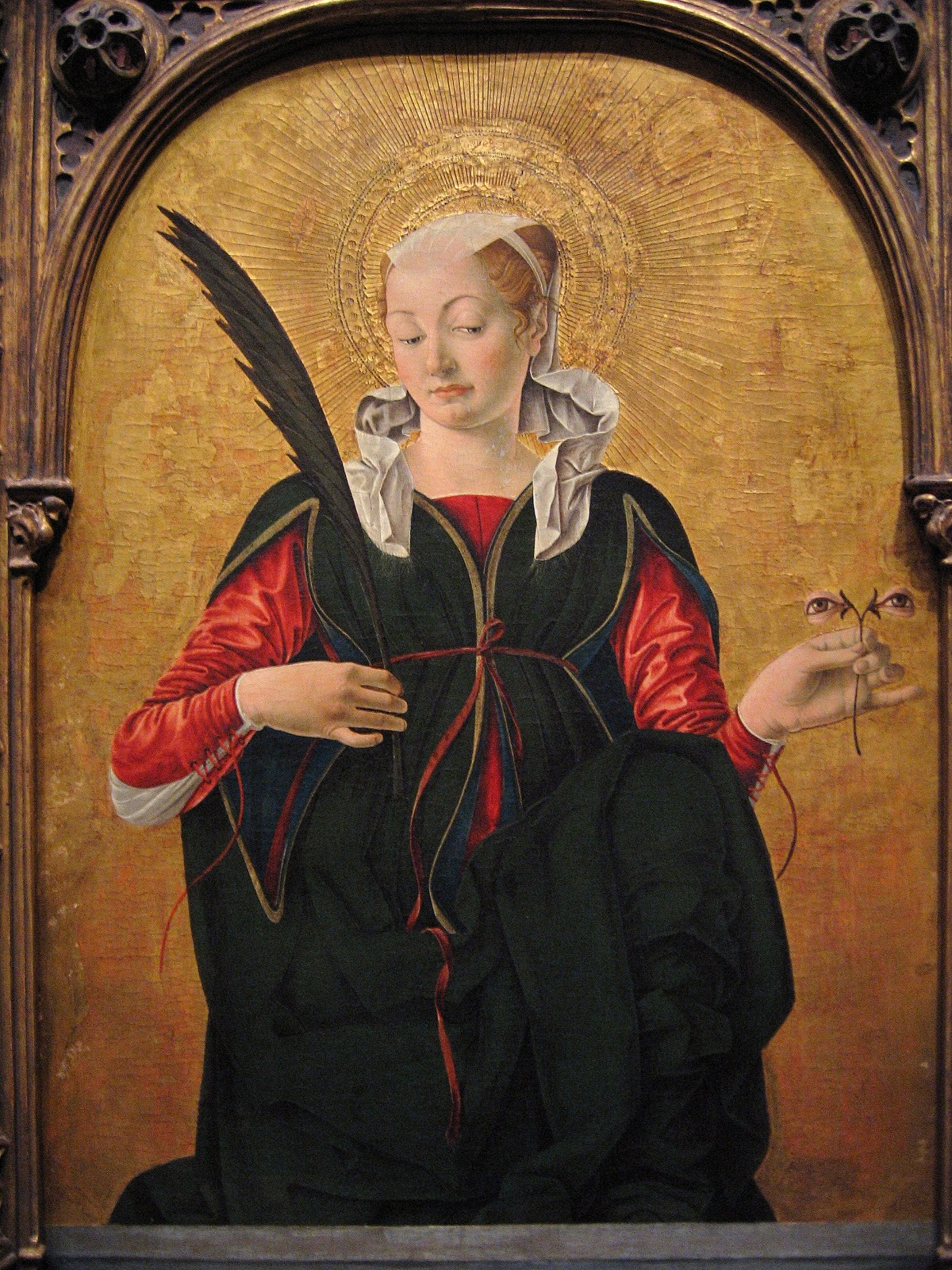
- Saint Lucy, by Francesco del Cossa (c. 1430–1477)
- Pronunciation: /ˈluːsi/ LOO-see; French: [lysi]
- Gender: Female
- Name day: 13 December

Origin
- Origin: Latin
- Meaning: Light
- Region of origin: Ancient Rome

Other names
- Related names: Luci, Luce, Lucia, Lucie, Lucey, Lucio, Lucile, Luciana, Luciano, Lucinda, Cindy, Luca, Luz

Lucy is an English feminine given name derived from the Latin masculine given name Lucius with the meaning as of light (born at dawn or daylight, maybe also shiny, or of light complexion). Alternative spellings are Luci and Lucie.

The English Lucy surname is taken from the Norman language that was Latin-based and derives from place names in Normandy based on the Latin male personal name Lucius. It was transmitted to England after the Norman Conquest in the 11th century (see also De Lucy).

== Feminine name variants ==
- Luíseach (Irish)
- Lusine, Լուսինե, Լուսինէ (Armenian)
- Lucija, Луција (Serbian)
- Lucy, Люси (Bulgarian)
- Lutsi, Луци (Macedonian)
- Lutsija, Луција (Macedonian)
- Liùsaidh (Scottish Gaelic)
- Liucija (Lithuanian)
- Liucilė (Lithuanian)
- Lūcija, Lūsija (Latvian)
- Lleucu (Welsh)
- Llúcia (Catalan)
- Loukia, Λουκία (Greek)
- Luca (Hungarian)
- Luce (French, Italian)
- Lucetta (English)
- Lucette (French)
- Lucy, Lusia, Lucia, Luciana, Lucinda (Indonesian)
- Luçia, Luçie, Luçije (Albanian)
- Lúcia (Portuguese)
- Lucía (Spanish)
- Lucia (Danish, English, Finnish, German, Italian, Norwegian, Romanian, Slovak, Swedish)
- Luciana (Italian, Portuguese, Romanian, Spanish)
- Lucie (French, Czech)
- Luciella (Italian)
- Lucienne (French)
- Lucija (Croatian, Slovene)
- Lucila (Spanish)
- Lucilla (Italian)
- Lucille (English, French)
- Lucinda (English, Portuguese)
- Lucinde (French)
- Lucita (Spanish)
- Łucja (Polish)
- Lucja (Polish)
- Lucy (English)
- Lucylia (Polish)
- Lucyna (Polish)
- Luz (Spanish)
- Luzi (German)
- Luzia (German, Portuguese)
- Luzie (German)

== Female people with the name ==
- Saint Lucy (283–304), Roman Christian saint and martyr
- Lucy, Japanese past member of rock band LAZYgunsBRISKY
- Lucy, South Korean member of girl group Wooah
- LUCY, professional name of Cooper B. Handy (born 1994), American musician, singer-songwriter, and producer
- Lucy (footballer) (born 1960), Brazilian former international footballer
- Lucy A. Delaney (c. 1828–1830–1910), African-American seamstress, slave narrator, and community leader
- Lucy A. Mallory (1846–1920), American writer, publisher, newspaper editor, and spiritualist
- Lucy Leavenworth Wilder Morris (1865–1935), American historian and teacher
- Lucy A. Snyder (born 1971), American science fiction-, fantasy-, humor-, horror-, and non-fiction writer
- Lucy Achiro Otim (born 1986), Ugandan politician and gender specialist
- Lucy Adams (born 2003), American field hockey player
- Lucy Addison (1861–1937), African American school teacher and principal
- Lucy Adeline Briggs Cole Rawson Peckinpah Smallman (1840–1920), American watercolor botanical artist and botanical collector
- Lucy Adlington (born 1970), British social- and textile historian, vintage clothing collector, and author
- Lucy Agnes Smyth (1882–1972), Irish political activist and military personnel
- Lucy Aharish (born 1981), Israeli journalist, news anchor, television host, and actress
- Lucy Aikin (1781–1864), English writer and biographer
- Lucy Akello (born 1980), Ugandan social worker and politician
- Lucy Akhurst (born 1970), English actress, writer, and director
- Lucy Aldrich (1869–1955), American philanthropist and art collector
- Lucy Alexa Heathcote Currie (1868–1957), Indian-born British Anglican medical- and education missionary, midwife, and nurse
- Lucy Alexander (born 1971), English television presenter and property expert
- Lucy Alibar (born 1983), American screenwriter and playwright
- Lucy Allais, South African academic and philosopher
- Lucy Allan, several people
- Lucy Ameh (born 1980), Nigerian Nollywood actress and businesswoman
- Lucy Anderson, several people
- Lucy Anin (born 1939), Ghanaian politician
- Lucy Ann (disambiguation), several people
- Lucy Ansell, Australian actress
- Lucy Appleby (1920–2008), English traditional cheesemaker
- Lucy Arbell (1878–1947), French mezzo-soprano
- Lucy Ariel Williams Holloway (1905–1973), African-American poet
- Lucy Armstrong (born 1991), English composer
- Lucy Ash, British documentary-maker, journalist, broadcaster, and author
- Lucy Ashjian (1907–1993), American photographer
- Lucy Ashworth-Clifford (born 1999), English footballer
- Lucy Aston, English former wife of actor, director, and television presenter Martin Clunes
- Lucy Atkins (born 1968), British author and journalist
- Lucy Atkinson (1817–1893), English explorer and author
- Lucy Awuni Mbun, Ghanaian politician
- Lucy Ayoub (born 1992), Israeli television presenter, poet, and radio host
- Lucy Bacon (1857–1932), American painter
- Lucy Bailey, British theatre director
- Lucy Bakewell Audubon (1787–1874), British-born American educator and philanthropist
- Lucy Baldwin (1869–1945), English writer and activist for maternal health
- Lucy Balian Rorke-Adams (born 1929), American pediatric neuropathologist
- Lucy Barbara Bradby, birth name of Barbara Hammond (1873–1961), English social historian
- Lucy Barfield (1935–2003), English godchild of author, literary scholar, and Anglican lay theologian C. S. Lewis
- Lucy Barnes, several people
- Lucy Barnett (born 2006), Isle of Man cricketer
- Lucy Barrow McIntire (1886–1967), American suffragist, activist, preservationist, actress, and poet
- Lucy Bartholomew (born 1996), Australian ultramarathon runner and endurance athlete
- Lucy Barton (1891–1979), American academic
- Lucy Barzun Donnelly, American film producer
- Lucy Batty, birth name of Skyla (born 1991), English dance singer
- Lucy Baxley (1937–2016), American politician
- Lucy Baxter (1837–1902), English writer on art
- Lucy Bayet, Australian fashion model
- Lucy Beall Candler Owens Heinz Leide (1883–1962), American heiress
- Lucy Beall Lott (born 1998), American-British academic, activist, and model
- Lucy Beatrice Malleson, real name of Anthony Gilbert (writer) (1899–1973), English crime writer
- Lucy Beaumont, several people
- Lucy Bedroque, American musician
- Lucy Beecroft (born 1996), English professional squash player
- Lucy Beere (born 1982), Guernsey international lawn- and indoor bowler
- Lucy Beeton (1829–1886), Aboriginal Tasmanian schoolteacher, trader, and Christian leader
- Lucy Beland (1870–1952), American criminal
- Lucy Bell (born 1968), English-born Australian actress
- Lucy Bella Earl (born 1994), British teacher of English, and YouTuber
- Lucy Bellinger (born 1993), Australian former AFLW player
- Lucy Bellwood (born 1989), American cartoonist and illustrator
- Lucy Bement (1868–1940), American medical missionary in China
- Lucy Benjamin (born 1970), English actress
- Lucy Beresford, English broadcaster, presenter, novelist, and psychotherapist
- Lucy Bethia Walford (1845–1915), Scottish novelist and artist
- Lucy Bhreatnach (1924–2007), Spanish-born Irish language activist
- Lucy Bigelow (1830–1905), American wife of Mormon leader Brigham Young
- Lucy Birley (1959–2018), English model, photographer, and socialite
- Lucy Blake, American conservationist
- Lucy Bland, English professor of social- and cultural history
- Lucy Bloom (born 1973), South African-born Australian businesswoman, speaker, and author
- Lucy Blue, several people
- Lucy Bogari, Papua New Guinean diplomat
- Lucy Booth (1868–1953), English Salvation Army officer
- Lucy Boryer (born 1966), American actress
- Lucy Boscana (1915–2001), Puerto Rican actress and television pioneer
- Lucy Bowen McCauley (born 1959), American choreographer, dancer, and teacher
- Lucy Boyden (born 2000), American politician
- Lucy Boynton (born 1994), English-American actress
- Lucy Bradshaw, several people
- Lucy Bramlette Patterson (1865–1942), American committee woman, author, and activist
- Lucy Brewer, American writer and purported female Marine during the War of 1812
- Lucy Briers, English actress
- Lucy Brightwell (1811–1875), English etcher and author
- Lucy Broadwood (1858–1929), English folksong collector and researcher
- Lucy Brocadelli (1476–1544), Italian Dominican tertiary whom Roman Catholics fame as a mystic and a stigmatic
- Lucy Bronze (born 1991), English professional footballer
- Lucy Brooks, several people
- Lucy Brown (disambiguation), several people
- Lucy Browne Johnston (1846–1937), American social- and political reformer and women's suffrage activist
- Lucy Bryan (born 1995), English pole vaulter
- Lucy Buck (1842–1918), American diarist
- Lucy Burle (born 1955), Brazilian former international freestyle- and butterfly swimmer
- Lucy Burman (1922–2004), American writer and union activist
- Lucy Burns (1879–1966), American suffragist and women's rights advocate
- Lucy Burwell Berkeley (1683–1716), American aristocrat
- Lucy Burwell Page Saunders (1808–1885), American writer
- Lucy C. Turnbull (1931–2019), American classics scholar, college professor, and museum director
- Lucy Caldwell (born 1981), Northern Irish playwright and novelist
- Lucy Calkins, American educator and professor
- Lucy Campbell, several people
- Lucy Cane (c. 1866–1926), Irish public servant
- Lucy Cappadona (born 2002), American soccer player
- Lucy Carnegie Ferguson (1899–1989), American conservationist; member of the industrialist Carnegie family
- Lucy Carpenter (born 1969), British chemist and professor of physical chemistry
- Lucy Carr (born 1976), English singer and model
- Lucy Cary (c. 1619–1650), English Benedictine nun and biographer
- Lucy Caslon, English founder of international charitable organization Msizi Africa
- Lucy Cavendish (1841–1925), English pioneer of women's education
- Lucy Chaffee Alden (1836–1912), American author, educator, and hymnwriter
- Lucy Chaffer (born 1983), Australian skeleton racer
- Lucy Chambers (1834–1894), Australian contralto
- Lucy Chambers (actress) (born 2006/2007), English actress
- Lucy Chao (1912–1998), Chinese poet and translator
- Lucy Chappell, English professor of obstetrics
- Lucy Charles-Barclay (born 1993), English professional triathlete
- Lucy Charlotte Benson (1860–1943), Australian organist, musician, and theatrical entrepreneur
- Lucy Chase (1822–1909), American schoolteacher during the American Civil War
- Lucy Chege (born 1976), Kenyan volleyball player
- Lucy Chester Parke (1709–1770), British colonial subject of Antigua, and plantation owner
- Lucy Christalnigg (1872–1914), Austro-Hungarian countess and aristocrat
- Lucy Christopher, British-Australian author
- Lucy Clementina Davies (1795–1879), French-born Scottish author
- Lucy Clifford (1846–1929), English novelist, playwright, and journalist
- Lucy Coats (born 1961), English writer of children's books
- Lucy Cohu (born 1968), English stage- and film actress
- Lucy Coleman (born 1998), Australian rower
- Lucy Coleman (director), Australian filmmaker
- Lucy Coles (1865–?), American missionary who traveled to Liberia
- Lucy Collett (born 1989), English glamour model
- Lucy Collinson, British microbiologist and electron microscopist
- Lucy Connolly, English criminal in the 2024 United Kingdom riots
- Lucy Cooke (born 1969/1970), British zoologist, author, television producer, director, and presenter
- Lucy Cores (1912–2003), Russian-American novelist
- Lucy Corin, American novelist and short story writer
- Lucy Cotton (1895–1948), American actress
- Lucy Cousins (born 1964), English author and illustrator of children's books
- Lucy Covington (1910–1982), Native American tribal leader and political activist
- Lucy Cox, several people
- Lucy Craft Laney (1854–1933), American educator
- Lucy Crane (1842–1882), English writer, art critic, and translator
- Lucy Cranwell (1907–2000), New Zealand botanist
- Lucy Crawford (?–1869), American member of the Crawford family of the White Mountains
- Lucy Creamer (born 1971), English professional climber
- Lucy Creemer Peckham (1842–1923), American nurse, physician, and poet
- Lucy Cripps (born 2001), Australian cricketer
- Lucy Crowe (born 1978), English soprano in opera and concert
- Lucy Cruz, American politician
- Lucy Culliton (born 1966), Australian artist
- Lucy D. Taylor (?–1965), American author, educator, and authority on interior decoration
- Lucy Dacus (born 1995), American singer-songwriter, guitarist, and record producer
- Lucy Dahl (born 1965), English screenwriter
- Lucy Dalglish, American journalist, attorney, professor, and former dean
- Lucy Danziger, American magazine editor and health writer
- Lucy Darling, alternate name of Carisa Hendrix (born 1987), Canadian magician, comedian, and fire eater
- Lucy Dathan, American politician
- Lucy Davenport, British actress
- Lucy Davidson (1920–2001), American teacher and politician
- Lucy Davis (born 1973), English actress
- Lucy Davis (equestrian) (born 1992), American Olympic equestrian
- Lucy Dawidowicz (1915–1990), American historian and writer
- Lucy Deakins (born 1971), American attorney and former actress
- Lucy Deane Streatfeild (1865–1950), Indian-born British civil servant, social worker, and factory inspector
- Lucy DeCoutere (born 1970), Canadian actress and Royal Canadian Air Force officer
- Lucy de Guzman Boyd (1916–2009), Australian artist
- Lucy de László (1870–1950), Anglo-Irish musician, diarist, and socialite
- Lucy de Newchurch, 14th-century English Christian hermit and anchoress
- Lucy Der Manuelian (1928–2021), American art historian
- Lucy Desmond (1899–1992), English Olympic gymnast
- Lucy DeVito (born 1983), American actress
- Lucy Diakovska (born 1976), Bulgarian singer and television personality
- Lucy Diamond (born 1970), English novelist
- Lucy Dickenson (1980–2012), Welsh humanitarian, social entrepreneur, and singer-songwriter
- Lucy Diggs Slowe (1883–1937), American educator and athlete
- Lucy Dillon (born 1974), English writer of romance novels
- Lucy Dinnen (born 1993), Australian rugby union player
- Lucy Dixon (born 1989), English actress
- Lucy Dodd (born 1981), American painter and installation artist
- Lucy Donnelly (1870–1948), American teacher of English
- Lucy Doolan (born 1987), New Zealand former cricketer
- Lucy Doolittle Thomson (1868–1943), American writer, historian, and architect
- Lucy Doraine (1898–1989), Hungarian silent film actress
- Lucy Dorsey Iams (1855–1924), American welfare worker and reform legislation leader
- Lucy Dougan (born 1966), Australian poet
- Lucy Douglas Cochrane, birth name of C. Z. Guest (1920–2003), American actress, author, columnist, horsewoman, fashion designer, and socialite
- Lucy Drake Marlow (1890–1978), American artist
- Lucy Dubinchik (born 1982), Israeli film-, television-, and stage actress
- Lucy Dudko (born 1958), Russian-Australian woman convicted of hijacking a helicopter
- Lucy Duff Grant (1894–1984), British nurse and matron
- Lucy Dugas Tillman, American mother who caused a change of women's rights and parental authority in South Carolina
- Lucy Duncan, New Zealand former ambassador to Argentina
- Lucy Dunn, American attorney and business leader
- Lucy Durack (born 1982), Australian actress, singer, and television personality
- Lucy Durán, British ethnomusicologist, record producer, and radio presenter
- Lucy Dyer-Edwardes, Countess of Rothes (1878–1956), Scottish philanthropist and social leader
- Lucy E. Salyer, American professor of history
- Lucy Easthope, British emergency planning expert, and former professor
- Lucy Eatock (1874–1950), Australian political activist
- Lucy Edwards, English influencer, disability activist, and journalist
- Lucy Ejike (born 1977), Nigerian Paralympic powerlifter
- Lucy Elizabeth Bather (1830–1864), English children's writer
- Lucy Elizabeth Montagu-Scott, British wife of Scottish diplomat and politician Cospatrick Douglas-Home, 11th Earl of Home
- Lucy Ella Moten (c. 1851–1933), American educator and medical doctor
- Lucy Ellen Guernsey (1826–1899), American author
- Lucy Ellen Sewall (1837–1890), American physician
- Lucy Elliott (born 1994), New Zealand actress
- Lucy Ellmann (born 1956), American-born English novelist
- Lucy Elmina Anthony (1859–1944), American women's suffrage- and rights activist
- Lucy Emeline Meaker (1838–1883), American woman executed for murder
- Lucy Escott (1829–1895), American soprano and actor-manager
- Lucy Evangelista (born 1986), Northern Irish model and beauty pageant titleholder
- Lucy Evans (born 1985), English actress
- Lucy Evans (sprinter) (born 1982), British track- and field athlete
- Lucy Evelina Akerman (1816–1874), American Unitarian writer
- Lucy Evelyn Cheesman (1881–1969), English entomologist and traveler
- Lucy Evelyn Peabody (1864/1865–1934), American activist
- Lucy Everest Boole (1862–1904), British chemist, pharmacist, and professor
- Lucy F. Farrow (1851–1911), African-American Pentecostal pastor
- Lucy F. Simms (1855/1856–1934), American slave turned educator
- Lucy Fabery (1931–2015), Puerto Rican singer
- Lucy Faithfull, Baroness Faithfull (1910–1996), South African-born British social worker and children's campaigner
- Lucy Fallon (born 1995), English actress
- Lucy Farrell, English folk musician
- Lucy Fato (born 1966), American corporate attorney
- Lucy Faulkner (1925–2012), Northern Irish journalist, unionist, and peace advocate
- Lucy Faulkner Orrinsmith (1839–1910), English tile painter, engraver, and embroiderer
- Lucy Faust (born 1986), American actress
- Lucy Feagin (1876–1963), American arts- and dramatics instructor
- Lucy Felton (born 1985), English fashion editor, journalist, and blogger
- Lucy Fenman Barron, American Union nurse during the American Civil War
- Lucy Filippini (1672–1732), Italian Roman Catholic saint
- Lucy Finch (born 1943), Malawian palliative nurse
- Lucy Fischer (born 1945), American film studies scholar and professor
- Lucy Fisher (born 1949), American film producer
- Lucy Fitch Perkins (1865–1937), American illustrator and writer of children's books
- Lucy Fitzgerald, several people
- Lucy Fleck, American beauty pageant titleholder
- Lucy Fleming (born 1947), British actress
- Lucy Flores (born 1979), American lawyer and former politician
- Lucy Flower (1837–1921), American children's rights activist
- Lucy Flucker Knox (1756–1824), American revolutionary
- Lucy Foley (born 1986), British author of contemporary-, historical fiction-, and mystery novels
- Lucy Forrest, British researcher
- Lucy Fortson, American astronomer
- Lucy Foster Madison (1865–1932), American novelist and teacher
- Lucy Foulkes, British academic, psychologist, writer, and science communicator
- Lucy Fox (1897–1970), American silent film actress
- Lucy Fradkin (born 1953), American self-taught artist
- Lucy Frances Harvey Rees, birth name of Lu Rees (1901–1983), Australian bookseller, book collector, and children's literature advocate
- Lucy Franks (1878–1964), Irish women's rights activist
- Lucy Frazer (born 1972), English politician and barrister
- Lucy Freeman (1916–2004), American journalist and author
- Lucy Freibert (1922–2016), American educator, women's studies scholar, and activist
- Lucy Frey (1932–2020), American feminist- and gay rights activist and educator
- Lucy Freyer, Australian stage-, film-, and television actress
- Lucy Fry (born 1992), Australian actress
- Lucy Fry Mathews (1830–1904), American former First Lady of West Virginia
- Lucy Fry Speed (1811–1893), American daughter of judge and farmer John Speed
- Lucy Furman (1870–1958), American novelist, short story writer, and animal welfare activist
- Lucy Furr, alternate name of Daffney (1975–2021), American professional wrestler and wrestling manager
- Lucy G. Acosta (1926–2008), Mexican-American activist
- Lucy Gallardo (1929–2012), Argentine-born Mexican actress and screenwriter
- Lucy Galló, Hungarian figure- and pair skater
- Lucy Gamble (1875–1958), American teacher and civic leader
- Lucy Gannon (born 1948), British playwright, television writer, and producer
- Lucy Garnett (1849–1934), English folklorist, ethnographer, and traveler
- Lucy Garvin (1851–1938), English-Australian headmistress
- Lucy Gaskell (born 1980), English actress
- Lucy Gates Bowen (1882–1951), American opera singer, and wife of lawyer and Mormon leader Albert E. Bowen
- Lucy Gérard (1872–1941), French stage- and silent film actress
- Lucy Gertrude Clarkin (1876–1947), Canadian poet
- Lucy Gichuhi (born 1962), Kenyan-born Australian politician
- Lucy Gilbert (born 1960), American programmer and video game developer
- Lucy Giles, British Army colonel
- Lucy Gillett (born 1993), American professional footballer
- Lucy Gilmer Fry, American mother of planter and businessman Joshua Fry Speed
- Lucy Glanville (born 1994), Australian Olympic biathlete
- Lucy Glendinning (born 1964), English sculptor and installation artist
- Lucy Glover (born 1998), British rower
- Lucy Godiva Woodcock (1889–1968), Australian pacifist, schoolteacher, trade union official, and women's activist
- Lucy Goldthwaite (1879–1957), American librarian of books for blind readers
- Lucy González (1933–1994), Colombian singer
- Lucy Goodale Thurston (1795–1876), American Christian missionary and author
- Lucy Goodison (born 1945), English archaeologist and feminist writer
- Lucy Gordon, several people
- Lucy Gossage (born 1979), British doctor, and former triathlete and duathlete
- Lucy Grace Dibble (1902–1998), British teacher, traveler, and travel writer
- Lucy Grant Cannon (1880–1966), American Mormon missionary
- Lucy Grantham, American actress
- Lucy Graves Taliaferro (1895–1984), American parasitologist and professor
- Lucy Gray (disambiguation), several people
- Lucy Grealy (1963–2002), Irish-American poet and memoirist
- Lucy Green (born 1957), British emerita professor of music education
- Lucy Green (dancer), New Zealand dancer
- Lucy Greenish (1888–1976), New Zealand architect
- Lucy Greenwood, British co-founder of clothing brand Lucy & Yak
- Lucy Griffiths, several people
- Lucy Grig, British professor of the history of late antiquity
- Lucy Grounds (1908–1987), Australian politician
- Lucy Guerin (born 1961), Australian dancer and choreographer
- Lucy Gulama (1896–1966), Sierra Leonean wife of Paramount Chief Julius Gulama
- Lucy Gullett (1876–1949), Australian medical practitioner and philanthropist
- Lucy Gunning (born 1964), English filmmaker, installation artist, sculptor, video artist, and lecturer
- Lucy Guo (born 1994), American entrepreneur and engineer
- Lucy Gutteridge (born 1956), English retired actress
- Lucy Gwanmesia (1941–2019), Cameroonian judge and politician
- Lucy Gwin (1943–2014), American disability rights activist
- Lucy Gwynn (1865–1947), Irish women's rights activist
- Lucy Gwynne Branham (1892–1966), American suffragist
- Lucy H. Washington (1835–1913), American poet and social reformer
- Lucy Hadaway (born 2000), English long jumper
- Lucy Hadi (born 1946), American former politician
- Lucy Hale (born 1989), American actress and singer
- Lucy Hale Tapley (1857–1932), American educator
- Lucy Hall, several people
- Lucy Halliday, American actress
- Lucy Hamilton, several people
- Lucy Hanna, American artist, photographer, and filmmaker
- Lucy Hannah (1875/1895?–1993), American longevity claimant
- Lucy Hardcastle (1771/1772–1834), British botanist and teacher
- Lucy Harris (1792–1836), American critic of Mormonism
- Lucy Harris (politician) (born 1990), British former politician and advisor
- Lucy Harrison (1844–1915), English teacher
- Lucy Harrison (enslaved woman) (c. 1764–1843), American enslaved housemaid and seamstress of President George Washington
- Lucy Hartley, British-born American professor of English
- Lucy Hartstonge (c. 1722–1793), Irish heiress and philanthropist
- Lucy Harwood (1893–1972), English painter
- Lucy Hastings, Countess of Huntingdon (1613–1679), English poet
- Lucy Hatton (born 1994), English hurler
- Lucy Hawking (born 1970), English journalist, novelist, educator, and philanthropist
- Lucy Hay, Countess of Carlisle (1599–1660), English courtier
- Lucy Hayes Herron (1877–1961), American socialite and golfer
- Lucy Hayward Barker (1872–1948), American painter
- Lucy Heavens, South African animator, voice actress, and television writer- and producer
- Lucy Henderson Owen Robertson (1850–1930), American academic, college president, historian, and temperance activist
- Lucy Herbert, several people
- Lucy Herndon Crockett (1914–2002), American novelist and artist
- Lucy Hickenlooper, birth name of Olga Samaroff (1880–1948), American pianist, music critic, and teacher
- Lucy Higgs Nichols (1838–1915), African American woman who escaped slavery during the American Civil War; served as a Union Army nurse
- Lucy Higham (born 1997), English cricketer
- Lucy Hillebrand (1906–1997), German architect
- Lucy Hiller Lambert Cleveland (1780–1866), American writer, diarist, traveler, artist, and social reformer
- Lucy Hobbs Taylor (1833–1910), American dentist and teacher
- Lucy Hockings, New Zealand-born news presenter
- Lucy Hodgson (born 1940), American sculptor and printmaker
- Lucy Holleron (born 1977), English journalist and presenter
- Lucy Holmes (born 1979), British-born Australian performer, TV presenter, radio host, screenplay writer, and director
- Lucy Honig (1948–2017), American short story writer
- Lucy Hood, several people
- Lucy Hooper (1816–1841), American writer and poet
- Lucy Hope, several people
- Lucy Horobin (born 1979), British radio presenter
- Lucy Horodny, Australian politician and environmentalist
- Lucy Hosking (1904–1996), Australian geoscientist
- Lucy Hounsom (born 1986), English author of fantasy and myth, and podcaster
- Lucy Huang, American dietitian; contestant on Survivor (American TV series)
- Lucy Hughes-Hallett (born 1951), British cultural historian, biographer, and novelist
- Lucy Hunter Blackburn, Scottish feminist, civil servant, researcher, and writer
- Lucy Hutchinson (1620–1681), English translator, poet, and biographer
- Lucy Hutchinson (actress) (born 2003), English former child actress
- Lucy Hutyra, American urban ecologist, and professor of earth and environment
- Lucy Illingworth, British contestant on The Piano (TV series)
- Lucy Inman (born 1961), American judge
- Lucy Irvine (born 1956), English adventurer and author
- Lucy Isabella Buckstone (1857–1893), English actress
- Lucy Isabelle Marsh (1878–1956), American lyric soprano and artist
- Lucy Iskanyan, Syrian politician
- Lucy Ives (born 1980), American novelist, poet, and critic
- Lucy Jane (disambiguation), several people
- Lucy Jaramillo (born 1983), Ecuadorian hurdler
- Lucy Jarvis, several people
- Lucy Jenkins (born 2000), New Zealand rugby union player
- Lucy Joan Slater (1922–2008), British mathematician
- Lucy Johnson, several people
- Lucy Johnston (born 1969), British journalist
- Lucy Johnston Sypher (1907–1990), American children's novel writer
- Lucy Jones (born 1955), American seismologist
- Lucy Joselyn Cutler Daniels (1858–1949), American suffragist and political activist
- Lucy Juckes, Scottish co-founder of children's book publisher Barrington Stoke
- Lucy Julia Hayner (1898–1971), American physicist
- Lucy Jumeyi Ogbadu (born 1953), Nigerian microbiologist
- Lucy Kalantari, American singer-songwriter, composer, and producer
- Lucy Kalappurakkal (born 1965), Indian former Roman Catholic nun and teacher
- Lucy Kaopaulu Peabody (1840–1928), Hawaiian high chiefess and courtier
- Lucy Kaplansky (born 1960), American folk musician
- Lucy Karczewski (born 1999/2000), British actress
- Lucy Kassa, Ethiopian journalist and war correspondent
- Lucy Katherine Armitage Chippindall (1913–1992), South African botanist and agrostologist
- Lucy Katz (1943–2013), American lawyer, and professor of business law, ethics, and dispute resolution
- Lucy Kellaway (born 1959), English journalist turned teacher
- Lucy Kelston (1923–2010), American operatic soprano singer
- Lucy Kemp-Welch (1869–1958), English artist and teacher
- Lucy Kennedy (born 1976), Irish television- and radio presenter and children's book author
- Lucy Kennedy (cyclist) (born 1988), Australian former racing cyclist
- Lucy Kennedy Miller (1880–1962), American suffragist, women's rights activist, and government reformer
- Lucy Kibaki (1936–2016), Kenyan wife of President Mwai Kibaki
- Lucy Killea (1922–2017), American politician
- Lucy Kiraly (born 1950), Romanian-born Australian fashion model and television presenter
- Lucy Kirkwood (born c. 1984), English playwright and screenwriter
- Lucy Knisley (born 1985), American comic artist and musician
- Lucy Knoch (1923–1990), American actress
- Lucy Knox (1845–1884), Anglo-Irish poet
- Lucy Kocharyan (born 1984), Armenian journalist, radio host, and blogger
- Lucy Koh (born 1968), American lawyer and circuit judge
- Lucy Komisar (born 1942), American investigative journalist and drama critic
- Lucy Kramer Cohen (1907–2007), American anthropologist and civil servant
- Lucy Krohg (1891–1977), French model, artist, dancer, and gallerist
- Lucy Kroll (1909–1997), American theatrical- and literary agent
- Lucy Kuptana, Canadian politician
- Lucy Kurien (born 1956), Indian social worker, women's rights activist, and Roman Catholic nun; founder and director of organization Maher
- Lucy Kurtz (1861–1938), German-born Irish wife of President Douglas Hyde
- Lucy, Lady Houston (1857–1936), English philanthropist, fascist sympathizer, political activist, and suffragist
- Lucy Lake (born 1972), African leader in the field of female education
- Lucy Lambert Hale (1841–1915), American socialite; daughter of Senator John P. Hale
- Lucy Lameck (1934–1993), Tanzanian politician
- Lucy Lang (born 1981), American attorney and author
- Lucy Lanigan (born 1994), Scottish field hockey player
- Lucy Larcom (1824–1893), American teacher, poet, and author
- Lucy Lawless (born 1968), New Zealand actress, singer, and director
- Lucy Lee Flippin (born 1943), American actress
- Lucy Lee-Robbins (1865–1943), American painter who lived in France
- Lucy Leriche (born 1963), American politician
- Lucy Letby (born 1990), English former nurse and convicted serial killer
- Lucy Lethbridge, British author of non-fiction books
- Lucy Leuchars (?–1847), English case manufacturer and entrepreneur
- Lucy Lewis, several people
- Lucy Li (born 2002), American professional golfer
- Lucy Liemann (born 1973), English actress
- Lucy Lincoln Drown (1848–1934), American nursing educator
- Lucy Lindsay-Hogg, British wife of photographer Antony Armstrong-Jones, 1st Earl of Snowdon
- Lucy Liu (born 1968), American actress, producer, and artist
- Lucy Lloyd (1834–1914), Welsh-born South African folklorist and linguist
- Lucy Love (born 1985), Danish rapper, singer, and artist
- Lucy Lowe (?–2000), English murder victim
- Lucy Lucero (1919–2010), American Latina community leader
- Lucy Ludwell Paradise (1752–1814), American-born hostess
- Lucy Lyttelton Cameron (1781–1858), English magazine editor and children's writer
- Lucy M. Boston (1892–1990), English novelist and artist
- Lucy M. Maltby (1900–1984), American home economics professor and designer
- Lucy M. Taggart (1880–1960), American artist and art educator; daughter of hotelier and politician Thomas Taggart
- Lucy MacGregor (born 1986), English sailor
- Lucy Mackintosh (historian), New Zealand historian, curator, and author
- Lucy MacNeil, Canadian member of musical group The Barra MacNeils
- Lucy Maino (born 1995), Papua New Guinean footballer and beauty pageant titleholder
- Lucy Mair (1901–1986), British anthropologist
- Lucy Maloney, Canadian politician and road safety advocate
- Lucy Mangan (born 1974), English journalist, author, columnist, features writer, and TV critic
- Lucy Manners, Duchess of Rutland (c. 1685–1751), English heiress
- Lucy Mansel (c. 1831–1916), Irish-born New Zealand homemaker and community worker
- Lucy Mapena, South African politician
- Lucy Margaret Baker (1836–1909), Canadian teacher and Presbyterian missionary
- Lucy Marguerite Frobisher (1890–1974), English artist and educator
- Lucy Maria Field Wanzer (1841–1930), American obstetrician
- Lucy Marinkovich, New Zealand dancer and choreographer
- Lucy Markham, English wife of industrialist and politician Sir Arthur Markham, 1st Baronet
- Lucy Markovic (1998–2025), Australian fashion model
- Lucy Marks (fl. 1778–1838), African-American Jew
- Lucy Marlow (1932–2018), American film- and television actress
- Lucy Martin, several people
- Lucy Mary, several people
- Lucy Mason, American politician
- Lucy Masterman (1884–1977), British poet and diarist
- Lucy Mathen (born 1953), Indian-born British ophthalmologist and former journalist
- Lucy Maunder, Australian cabaret and theatre performer
- Lucy May, several people
- Lucy Maynard Salmon (1853–1927), American historian
- Lucy McBath (born 1960), American politician
- Lucy McCallum (born 1963), Australian judge and lawyer
- Lucy McCormick, British performance artist and actress
- Lucy McEvoy (born 2001), Australian AFLW player
- Lucy McGinness, alternate name of Alngindabu (c. 1874–1961), Australian Aboriginal elder, Roman Catholic, and domestic worker
- Lucy McKenzie (born 1977), Scottish painter
- Lucy McKim Garrison (1842–1877), American song collector and co-editor
- Lucy McLauchlan (born 1977), British contemporary artist
- Lucy McNulty, Canadian film producer, director, screenwriter, and actress
- Lucy McRae (born 1979), British-born Australian science fiction artist, body architect, filmmaker, and TED fellow
- Lucy Meacham Thruston (1862–1938), American Quaker, and writer of historical novels
- Lucy Meacock, English journalist and broadcaster
- Lucy Meadows (1981–2013), English transgender teacher who committed suicide
- Lucy Mecklenburgh (born 1991), English actress, model, television personality, and entrepreneur
- Lucy Meeko (1929–2004), Canadian Inuk artist
- Lucy Meggitt, British member of bubblegum pop pop group Fast Food Rockers
- Lucy Mensing (1901–1995), German physicist and pioneer of quantum mechanics
- Lucy Mercer Rutherfurd (1891–1948), American woman who had an affair with President Franklin D. Roosevelt
- Lucy Meredith Bryce (1897–1968), Australian haematologist and medical researcher
- Lucy Meyle, New Zealand multidisciplinary artist
- Lucy Middleton (1894–1983), British politician
- Lucy Millington (1825–1900), American botanist
- Lucy Millowitsch (1905–1990), German stage- and film actress, stage director and producer, theatre co-owner and manager, and dramatist
- Lucy Mingo (born 1931), American quilt maker
- Lucy Minnie Baldock (1864–1954), British suffragette
- Lucy Minnigerode (1871–1935), American nurse during World War I
- Lucy Mitchell, several people
- Lucy Monaghan (born 1989), Northern Irish human rights activist
- Lucy Monkman, real name of Monki (DJ), English DJ and footballer
- Lucy Monroe (1906–1987), American operatic soprano singer and dancer
- Lucy Montgomery, several people
- Lucy Montz (1842–1922), American dentist
- Lucy Mooney (c. 1880–1969), American artist and quilter
- Lucy Moore, several people
- Lucy Morgan (disambiguation), several people
- Lucy Morice (1859–1951), Australian kindergarten worker and social reformer
- Lucy Morton (1898–1980), English competition swimmer
- Lucy Moss (born 1994), English musical theatre composer, lyricist, playwright, writer, and director
- Lucy Mtilatila, Malawian meteorologist
- Lucy Mulhall (born 1993), Irish retired rugby sevens player
- Lucy Mulloy, British screenwriter, film director, producer, and cinematographer
- Lucy Muyoyeta, Zambian women's rights activist, social development consultant, and writer
- Lucy Mvubelo (1920–2000), South African trade unionist
- Lucy N. Colman (1817–1906), American freethinker, abolitionist, and feminist campaigner
- Lucy Nagle, Irish creative director
- Lucy Napaljarri Kennedy (born c. 1926), Australian Aboriginal painter
- Lucy Neale (born 1948), American-German singer-songwriter
- Lucy Nethsingha (born 1973), British politician
- Lucy Netser, Inuk Canadian Anglican bishop
- Lucy Nettie Fletcher (1886–1918), British-born American nurse during World War I
- Lucy Nettlefold (1891–1966), British company director and politician
- Lucy Neville, several people
- Lucy Newcombe (born 1975), British former field hockey player
- Lucy Newell, several people
- Lucy Newlyn (born 1956), English literary critic, poet, academic, and retired professor
- Lucy Nicolar Poolaw (1882–1969), American Penobscot suffragist, singer, and human rights activist
- Lucy Nkya (born 1952), Tanzanian politician
- Lucy Noakes (born 1964), British historian
- Lucy Noakes, British former press secretary
- Lucy Noel-Buxton, Baroness Noel-Buxton (1888–1960), English politician
- Lucy Nulton (1903–2000), American educator
- Lucy O'Brien (born 1961), British author and journalist
- Lucy O'Brien (doctor) (1923–2006), Irish Roman Catholic missionary sister and doctor in Africa
- Lucy O'Brien (philosopher) (born 1964), British philosopher and professor
- Lucy O'Byrne, British contestant on The Voice UK series 4
- Lucy of Bolingbroke (c. 1074–1136), Anglo-Norman heiress and landowner
- Lucy Offerall, Puerto Rican-born American past member of girl group The GTOs
- Lucy Olcott (1877–1922), American art historian and dealer
- Lucy Oldfield (1925–1989), British chemist
- Lucy Oliver (born 1988), New Zealand middle-distance runner
- Lucy Olsen (born 2003), American WNBA- and WNBL player
- Lucy Oommen (?–2002), Indian gynaecologist
- Lucy O'Reilly (born 1999), Irish cricketer
- Lucy O'Reilly Schell (1896–1952), American racing driver, team owner, and businesswoman
- Lucy Orta (born 1966), English contemporary visual artist
- Lucy Ortlepp (1883–1943), German Jewish painter who was murdered in Auschwitz
- Lucy Osburn (1836–1891), English nurse who founded modern nursing in Australia
- Lucy Ovia (born 1967), Papua New Guinean former cricketer
- Lucy Owen (born 1971), Welsh television news reader
- Lucy Ozarin (1914–2017), American naval psychiatrist during World War II
- Lucy P. Pettway (1930–2003), American quilter
- Lucy Packer (born 2000), Anglo-Welsh rugby union player
- Lucy Paez, American actress
- Lucy Page Gaston (1860–1924), American anti-tobacco activist
- Lucy Panton, British journalist and former crime editor
- Lucy Pao, American electrical engineer and control theorist
- Lucy Pardee, British casting director
- Lucy Pargeter (born 1977), English actress
- Lucy Parham (born 1966), British concert pianist, academic, and professor
- Lucy Parker (born 1998), English professional footballer
- Lucy Parry (born 2004), English professional footballer
- Lucy Parsons (c. 1851–1942), American labor organizer, author, speaker, and newspaper editor
- Lucy Partington (1952–1974), English murder victim
- Lucy Patané (born 1985), Argentine multi-instrumentalist musician, composer, and producer
- Lucy Patterson (1931–2000), American social worker, politician, and professor
- Lucy Payne (born 1992), English kickboxer and muay thai fighter
- Lucy Payton (1877–1969), American silent film actress
- Lucy Peabody, several people
- Lucy Peacock (fl. 1785–1816), British author, editor, translator, bookseller, and publisher of children's books
- Lucy Peacock (actress) (born 1960), Canadian actress
- Lucy Pearman, British comedian, actress, and writer
- Lucy Pearson, several people
- Lucy Peck (1846–1930), English doll maker, entrepreneur, and proprietor
- Lucy Peltz, British art historian
- Lucy Peng, alternate name of Peng Lei (born 1972/1973), Chinese billionaire businesswoman
- Lucy Peppiatt (born 1965), English Anglican theologian and author
- Lucy Perkins Carner (1886–1983), American sociologist, civil rights activist, and pacifist
- Lucy Perrett (born 1960), British Olympic canoe sprinter
- Lucy Pickens (1832–1899), American socialite, writer, and slave owner during the American Civil War
- Lucy Pinder (born 1983), English glamour model and actress
- Lucy Pitt (1692–1723), British wife of army officer and politician James Stanhope, 1st Earl Stanhope
- Lucy Porter (born 1973), English comedian, writer, presenter, and actress
- Lucy Powell (born 1974), English politician
- Lucy Prebble (born 1980), English playwright and producer
- Lucy Pullen (born 1971), Canadian artist
- Lucy Punch (born 1977), English actress
- Lucy Qinnuayuak (1915–1982), Inuit Canadian graphic artist and printmaker
- Lucy Quinn (born 1993), English professional footballer
- Lucy Quintero (1948–2023), Panamanian folk singer
- Lucy Quist (born c. 1974), Ghanaian-British business- and technology executive
- Lucy R. Lippard (born 1937), American writer, art critic- and historian, activist, and curator
- Lucy R. Wyatt, English mathematician and professor
- Lucy Railton, British composer and cellist
- Lucy Randolph Mason (1882–1959), American labor activist and suffragist
- Lucy Ratcliffe, English contestant on Britain's Next Top Model series 1
- Lucy Raven (born 1977), American artist
- Lucy Raverat (born 1948), British painter
- Lucy Rawlings Tootell (1911–2010), American schoolteacher and politician
- Lucy Redler (born 1979), German politician
- Lucy Reed (1921–1998), American jazz- and blues singer
- Lucy Reed (lawyer), American lawyer, scholar, and professor
- Lucy Rehm, American politician
- Lucy Renée Mathilde Schwob, birth name of Claude Cahun (1894–1954), French photographer, sculptor, and writer
- Lucy Renshall (born 1995), English Olympic judoka
- Lucy Reum (1914–2005), American Constitutional Convention delegate and horse racing industry reformer
- Lucy Reynell (1577–1652), English daughter of goldsmith and jeweler Robert Brandon
- Lucy Riall, Irish historian and professor
- Lucy Rider Meyer (1849–1922), American social worker, educator, physician, and author
- Lucy Rigby (born c. 1982), British politician and solicitor
- Lucy Rimmer, English past member of post-punk band The Fall (band)
- Lucy Roberts (born 2001), English professional footballer
- Lucy Robins Lang (1884–1962), American activist
- Lucy Robinson, several people
- Lucy Rock, British newspaper editor
- Lucy Rockefeller Waletzky (born 1941), American philanthropist and environmentalist
- Lucy Rogers (born 1973), English author, inventor, engineer, and visiting professor
- Lucy Rogers (politician), American politician
- Lucy Rokach, Egyptian-born English professional poker player
- Lucy Rose (born 1989), English singer-songwriter
- Lucy Rose (writer) (born 1996), English writer and filmmaker
- Lucy Ross Henson (1879–1968), American singer, bank clerk, music director, and clubwoman
- Lucy Rowan Mann (1921–2022), American nonprofit administrator
- Lucy Rushton (born 1985), English football manager and sports analyst
- Lucy Russell, several people
- Lucy S. Tompkins, American practicing internist and professor of medicine
- Lucy Safo, Ghanaian novelist
- Lucy Salani (1924–2023), Italian transgender activist who survived the Holocaust
- Lucy Sale-Barker (1841–1892), British children's writer
- Lucy Salisbury Doolittle (1832–1908), American philanthropist and clubwoman
- Lucy Sample, American woman who was executed during the Black Hawk War
- Lucy Sanders (born 1954), American computer scientist
- Lucy Sante (born 1954), Belgian-born American writer, critic, and artist
- Lucy Saroyan (1946–2003), American actress and photographer
- Lucy Saunders (born 1957), American writer
- Lucy Say (1800–1886), American naturalist and scientific artist
- Lucy Scarborough Conant (1867–1920), American painter, and costume- and set designer
- Lucy Scarbrough (1927–2020), American pianist, conductor, and educator
- Lucy Scherer (born 1981), German singer, dancer, and actress
- Lucy Schwartz (born 1989), American singer and songwriter
- Lucy Scott (born 1971), English actress
- Lucy Scott-Moncrieff (born 1954), British human rights lawyer
- Lucy Seki (1939–2017), Brazilian linguist
- Lucy Sexton, American performer, director, choreographer, and magazine editor
- Lucy Shapiro (born 1940), American professor of developmental biology
- Lucy Sharman (born 2003), Australian field hockey player
- Lucy Shaw (born 1997), British professional racing cyclist
- Lucy Sheen, British Hong Kong actress, playwright, and activist
- Lucy Shelton, American soprano singer
- Lucy Shepard Freeland (1890–1972), American linguist
- Lucy Shepherd (born 1998), English professional footballer
- Lucy Shoe Meritt (1906–2003), American classical archaeologist and scholar
- Lucy Shtein (born 1996), Russian-born Icelandic musician, feminist, political activist, and former criminal
- Lucy Shuker (born 1980), English wheelchair tennis player
- Lucy Sibbick, British special effects make-up artist
- Lucy Sichone (1954–1998), Zambian civil rights activist
- Lucy Siegle (born 1974), English journalist, reporter, and writer on environmental issues
- Lucy Simon (1940–2022), American singer, composer, and musician
- Lucy Single (born 2002), Australian AFLW player
- Lucy Skaer (born 1975), English contemporary artist
- Lucy Skidmore Scribner (1853–1931), American founder of Skidmore College
- Lucy Somerville Howorth (1895–1997), American lawyer, feminist, and politician
- Lucy Soulsby (1856–1927), British headmistress and anti-suffragist
- Lucy Soutter (born 1967), English former professional squash player
- Lucy Sparrow (born 1986), English contemporary artist
- Lucy Speed (born 1976), English actress
- Lucy Spiegel, American former news producer
- Lucy Spoors (born 1990), New Zealand rower
- Lucy Spraggan (born 1991), English singer-songwriter
- Lucy Sprague, several people
- Lucy Stanhope (born 2001), English artistic gymnast
- Lucy Stanhope (1714–1785), British daughter of army officer and politician James Stanhope, 1st Earl Stanhope
- Lucy Staniforth (born 1992), English professional footballer
- Lucy Stanton, several people
- Lucy Stedman Lamson (1857–1926), American businesswoman and educator
- Lucy Steeds (born 1993/1994), English writer
- Lucy Steele (born 1969), Canadian former cross-country skier
- Lucy Stephan (born 1991), Australian rower
- Lucy St. Louis, English actress and singer
- Lucy St. John, English mother of translator, poet, and biographer Lucy Hutchinson
- Lucy Stone (1818–1893), American orator, abolitionist, suffragist, and women's rights activist
- Lucy Stoyles, Canadian politician
- Lucy Suazo (born 1981), Dominican Republic volleyball player
- Lucy Suchman, British professor emerita of anthropology, science, technology, and sociology
- Lucy Surhyel Newman (born 1965), Nigerian international consultant, policy advisor, and author
- Lucy Sussex (born 1957), New Zealand-born Australian author of fiction and non-fiction, and editor, reviewer, academic, and teacher
- Lucy Sutherland (1903–1980), Australian-born British historian and academic
- Lucy Switzer (1844–1922), American temperance- and suffrage activist
- Lucy Sykes (born 1969), English-American entrepreneur, fashion executive, consultant, and socialite
- Lucy T. Pettway (1921–2004), American artist
- Lucy Takiora Lord (1842–1893), New Zealand guide and interpreter
- Lucy Talbot (born 1989), New Zealand field hockey player
- Lucy Talcott (1899–1970), American archaeologist
- Lucy Tallon (born 2006), English sprinter
- Lucy Tamlyn (born 1955), American diplomat
- Lucy Tammam, British fashion designer
- Lucy Tan, American writer
- Lucy Tasseor Tutsweetok (1934–2012), Canadian Inuk artist
- Lucy Tayiah Eads (1888–1961), Native American leader and politician
- Lucy Taylor (born 1951), American horror novel writer
- Lucy Tejada (1920–2011), Colombian contemporary painter
- Lucy Telles (c. 1870–1885–c. 1955/1956), Native American basket weaver
- Lucy Terry (c. 1733–1821), African-born American settler and poet
- Lucy Thane (born 1967), British documentary filmmaker, event producer, and performer
- Lucy Theis (born 1960), English judge and lawyer
- Lucy Thomas, several people
- Lucy Thompson (1856–1932), Yurok author
- Lucy Thoumaian (1890–1940), Swiss-born Armenian women's rights- and peace activist
- Lucy Meacham Thruston (1862–1938), American writer of historical novels
- Lucy Thurber (born 1970), American playwright
- Lucy Thurman (1849–1918), American national temperance lecturer
- Lucy Thurston Blaisdell (1903–1986), American former First Lady of Honolulu, and a teacher
- Lucy Torres-Gomez (born 1974), Filipino actress and politician
- Lucy Townsend (1781–1847), British abolitionist
- Lucy Treloar, Malaysian-born Australian novelist
- Lucy Tripti Gomes, Bangladeshi stage- and film actress
- Lucy Troisi, Canadian former politician and public servant
- Lucy Tulugarjuk (born 1975), Inuk-Canadian actress, throat singer, and director
- Lucy Tun, English musician
- Lucy Turmel (born 1999), English professional squash player
- Lucy Turnbull (born 1958), Australian businesswoman, philanthropist, former local government politician, and former First Lady of Australia
- Lucy Tyler-Sharman (born 1965), Australian Olympic- and World Champion cyclist
- Lucy Underdown (born 1990), English strongwoman competitor and policewoman
- Lucy van Dael (born 1946), Dutch baroque violinist
- Lucy van der Haar (born 1994), English former professional racing cyclist
- Lucy Verasamy (born 1980), British meteorologist and television presenter
- Lucy Vinis (born 1952/1953), American politician
- Lucy Virginia French (1825–1881), American author and poet
- Lucy Virginia Meriwether Davies (1862–1949), American physician, botanist, civil libertarian, suffragist, philosopher, and lover of music and art
- Lucy W. Abell (1808–1893), American physician
- Lucy W. Benson (1927–2021), American government official
- Lucy Wadham (born 1964), English novelist, poet, screenwriter, and writer of crime fiction
- Lucy Wainwright, several people
- Lucy Wales (born 2003), Australian AFLW player
- Lucy Walker, several people
- Lucy Wallace Porter (1876–1962), American photographer
- Lucy Walsh (born 1982), American actress, singer, songwriter, and pianist
- Lucy Walter (c. 1630–1658), Welsh mistress of King Charles II of England and mother of James, Duke of Monmouth
- Lucy Walters, British American actress
- Lucy Wambui Murigi (born 1985), Kenyan mountain runner
- Lucy Wamsley (1871–1947), English hospital matron and lady inspector
- Lucy Wanapuyngu (born 1955), Aboriginal Australian fibre artist and disability rights activist
- Lucy Wangui Kabuu (born 1984), Kenyan long-distance runner
- Lucy Warburton (tennis), British tennis player
- Lucy Ward, several people
- Lucy Warner (born 1943), Canadian actress
- Lucy Washburn (1848–1939), American high school education pioneer
- Lucy Waverman, Canadian food journalist, editor, columnist, food consultant, and cookbook author
- Lucy Webb, American comedian and actress
- Lucy Webb Hayes (1831–1889), American wife of President Rutherford B. Hayes
- Lucy Weber (born 1952), American politician
- Lucy Weguelin (1839–1932), English immigrant in Belgium
- Lucy Wertheim (1883–1971), English art collector, patron, and gallerist
- Lucy Westlake (born 2003), American mountaineer
- Lucy Weston Pickett (1904–1997), American academic, professor, chemist, and zoologist
- Lucy Wheelock (1857–1946), American early childhood educator and writer
- Lucy Whipp (born 1995), English footballer
- Lucy White (1848–1923), English folk-singer
- Lucy Whitehead McGill Waterbury Peabody (1861–1949), American Baptist missionary
- Lucy Whyte (born 1984), Scottish broadcast journalist
- Lucy Wicks, several people
- Lucy Wigmore (born 1977), New Zealand stage- and screen actress
- Lucy Wildheart (born 1993), Swedish professional boxer
- Lucy Wilkins, English violinist and keyboardist
- Lucy Williams (disambiguation), several people
- Lucy Wills (1888–1964), English haematologist and physician researcher
- Lucy Wilson, several people
- Lucy Winchester (secretary) (born 1937), American socialite and farmer
- Lucy Winkett (born 1968), English Anglican priest
- Lucy Winskell, English lawyer and academic
- Lucy Winsor Killough (1897–1989), American economist and professor
- Lucy Winter (born 1995), Scotland international rugby union player
- Lucy Winthrop (1600–1679), American Puritan settler
- Lucy Wood, several people
- Lucy Wooding, British historian, academic, and professor
- Lucy Woodward (born 1977), English-American singer-songwriter
- Lucy Worsley (born 1973), English historian, author, curator, television presenter, and podcaster
- Lucy Wortham James (1880–1938), American philanthropist
- Lucy Wright (1760–1821), American Shaker missionary
- Lucy Yardley (born 1961), British psychologist and professor of health psychology
- Lucy Yates (1863–1935), British suffragist, journalist, and writer
- Lucy Yeghiazaryan (born 1991), Armenian vocalist and violinist
- Lucy Yeomans, English magazine editor
- Lucy Yi Zhenmei (1815–1862), Chinese Sichuanese Catholic saint
- Lucy Young (born 1954), American naval officer
- Lucy Zelić (born 1986), Australian television presenter and political commentator
- Lucy Zhang, American mechanical engineer
- Lucy Ziurys (born 1957), American astrochemist and professor

== Male people with the name ==
- Lucy, code-name of anti-Nazi Rudolf Roessler during World War II
- Lucy Daniels, pen name of Ben M. Baglio (born 1960), American author
- Lucy Hairston (1892–1944), American college football player
- Lucy Knightley (1742–1791), British politician

== Animals with the name ==
- Lucy (1998–2011), British dog in the UK children's TV entertainment programme Blue Peter
- Lucy Lucy Apple Juice, American dog in The Real Housewives of Beverly Hills season 9
- Lucy Temerlin (1964–1987), American chimpanzee

== Fossils with the name ==
- Lucy (hominid) (c. 3,000,000 BCE), fossil also known as AL 288-1
- Lucy's baby (c. 3.3 million years), fossil

== Fictional characters ==
- Lucy/Nyu, in the Japanese manga series Elfen Lied, voiced by Sanae Kobayashi (Japanese), Kira Vincent-Davis (TV), and Carli Mosier (English)
- Lucy, in the song Lucy in the Sky with Diamonds by the Beatles
- Lucy, from the 2023 turn-based tactical role-playing video game Reverse: 1999
- Lucy Abarnathy, in the 2006 US historical romance novel On the Way to the Wedding
- Lucy Aroma, in the Philippine TV drama anthology series Magpakailanman, played by Sunshine Dizon
- Lucy Baker, in the US TV series Lassie, played by Pamelyn Ferdin
- Lucy Barker, in the UK children's TV sitcom My Parents Are Aliens, played by Charlotte Francis
- Lucy Barton, in the 2016 US novel My Name Is Lucy Barton
- Lucy Bauer, in the US TV series Agents of S.H.I.E.L.D., played by Lilli Birdsell
- Lucy Beale, in the UK TV soap opera EastEnders, played by Eva Brittin-Snell, Casey Anne Rothery, Melissa Suffield, and Hetti Bywater
- Lucy Bennett, in the US medical sitcom Scrubs, played by Kerry Bishé
- Lucy Benson, in the UK soap opera Hollyoaks, played by Kerrie Taylor
- Lucy Berliner, in the 1998 independent romantic drama film High Art, played by Ally Sheedy
- Lucy Brown, in the 1928 German play The Threepenny Opera, played by Kate Kühl
- Lucy Burrows, in the 1919 US silent melodrama film Broken Blossoms, played by Lillian Gish
- Lucy Calder, in the UK TV soap opera Emmerdale, played by Elspeth Brodie
- Lucy Camden-Kinkirk, in the US family drama TV series 7th Heaven, played by Beverley Mitchell
- Lucy Carlesi, in the 1975 UK supernatural horror film I Don't Want to Be Born, played by Joan Collins
- Lucy Carmichael, in the 1951 UK novel of the same name
- Lucy Carmichael, in the 1966 prime-time TV special Lucy in London, played by Lucille Ball
- Lucy Coe, in the US daytime TV soap opera General Hospital, played by Lynn Herring
- Lucy Collins, in the UK TV soap opera Brookside, played by Katrin Cartlidge and Maggie Saunders
- Lucy Crown, in the 1956 US novel of the same name
- Lucy Cunningham-Schultz, in the evangelical Christian radio drama and comedy series Adventures in Odyssey, voiced by Genni Long
- Lucy Day, in the UK soap opera Family Affairs, played by Julie Smith
- Lucy Dotson, in the crime drama TV series Sue Thomas: F.B.Eye, played by Enuka Okuma
- Lucy Ewing, in the US prime time soap opera Dallas, played by Charlene Tilton
- Lucy Fields, in the US medical drama TV series Grey's Anatomy, played by Rachael Taylor
- Lucy Fletcher, in the UK science fiction TV series Doctor Who episode The Return of Doctor Mysterio, played by Charity Wakefield
- Lucy Gallant, in the 1955 US drama film Lucy Gallant, played by Jane Wyman
- Lucy Gayheart, in the 1935 US novel of the same same
- Lucy Gray Baird, in the 2020 US dystopian young adult action-adventure novel The Ballad of Songbirds and Snakes
- Lucy Gringe, in the Septimus Heap UK children's fantasy novels
- Lucy Hare, in the 2006 shoot 'em up video game Star Fox Command
- Lucy Heartfilia, in the 2006 manga series Fairy Tail, voiced in its 2009 anime adaptation by Aya Hirano (Japanese) and Cherami Leigh (English)
- Lucy Johnson, in the UK children's TV drama series Grange Hill, played by Daisy McCormick
- Lucy Kenwright, in the US comedy-drama TV series Studio 60 on the Sunset Strip, played by Lucy Davis
- Lucy Knight, in the US medical drama TV series ER, played by Kellie Martin
- Lucy Lane, in the Superman comics published by US DC Comics
- Lucy Lewis, in the New Zealand children's comedy web series Lucy Lewis Can't Lose, played by Thomasin McKenzie
- Lucy Lightfoot, Isle of Wight fictional girl who disappeared
- Lucy Loud, in the US animated sitcom The Loud House, voiced by Jessica DiCicco and Aubin Bradley
- Lucy MacLean, in the US post-apocalyptic drama TV series Fallout, played by Ella Purnell
- Lucy Macmillan, in the Japanese science fiction mecha anime media franchise Macross
- Lucy Mancini, in the 1972 US epic gangster film The Godfather, and its 1990 sequel, played by Jeannie Linero
- Lucy Maria Misora, in the Japanese romance eroge visual novel To Heart 2
- Lucy Marsden, in the 1989 US novel Oldest Living Confederate Widow Tells All
- Lucy-May Popple, in the Japanese anime series Lucy-May of the Southern Rainbow, voiced by Minori Matsushima
- Lucy McClane, in the US action film series and media franchise Die Hard, played by Taylor Fry and Mary Elizabeth Winstead
- Lucy Miller, in the 2014 English-language French science fiction action film Lucy, played by Scarlett Johansson
- Lucy Milligan, in the UK TV drama Footballers' Wives, played by Helen Latham
- Lucy Mitchell, in the UK children's TV drama series Grange Hill, played by Belinda Crane
- Lucy Monostone, in the Japanese manga series Multiple Personality Detective Psycho
- Lucy Montgomery, in the US TV soap opera As the World Turns, played by Amanda Seyfried, Peyton List, Spencer Grammer, and Sarah Glendening
- Lucy Moran, in the US surrealist mystery horror drama TV series Twin Peaks, played by Kimmy Robertson
- Lucy Owens, in the 2000 romantic comedy film About Adam, played by Kate Hudson
- Lucy Penton, in the UK TV soap opera EastEnders, played by Sophy Newton
- Lucy Pervertski, in the 2007 US parody film Epic Movie, played by Jayma Mays
- Lucy Pevensie, in the UK novel series The Chronicles of Narnia, played by Sophie Wilcox and Georgie Henley in the film adaptations
- Lucy Quinn Fabray, in the US jukebox musical comedy-drama TV series Glee, played by Dianna Agron
- Lucy Ramirez, American fictional person in the Killian documents controversy
- Lucy Ricardo, in the US sitcom I Love Lucy, played by Lucille Ball
- Lucy Richards, in the UK TV soap opera Coronation Street, played by Katy Carmichael
- Lucy Rickman, in the New Zealand prime-time soap opera Shortland Street, played by Grace Palmer
- Lucy Robinson, in the Australian TV soap opera Neighbours, played by Kylie Flinker, Sasha Close, and Melissa Bell
- Lucy Romalotti, in the US TV soap opera The Young and the Restless, played by James, Monte, and Viviana (2011), Abigail and Olivia Moore (2012–2013), and Lily Brooks O'Briant (2023–present)
- Lucy Soutakis, in the 2008 UK comedy TV series Parents of the Band, played by Lucinda Dryzek
- Lucy Steel, in the manga series JoJo's Bizarre Adventure
- Lucy Stevens, in the 2019 fantasy comedy film Detective Pikachu, voiced by Kathryn Newton
- Lucy Stillman, in the historical action-adventure video game series Assassin's Creed, voiced by Kristen Bell
- Lucy Sullivan, in the 1996 Irish novel Lucy Sullivan Is Getting Married
- Lucy Swann, in the 1994 US post-apocalyptic TV miniseries The Stand, played by Bridgit Ryan
- Lucy Taylor, in the UK children's TV drama series The Dumping Ground, played by Sally Rogers
- Lucy the Slut, in the musical comedy Avenue Q, played by Stephanie D'Abruzzo, Julie Atherton, and Kelli Sawyer
- Lucy Tsukioka, in the Japanese fantasy romantic comedy manga series Ayakashi Triangle, voiced by Yuka Nukui (vomic) and Hina Kino (anime)
- Lucy van Pelt, in the comic strip Peanuts
- Lucy Vaughn, in the UK medical soap opera Doctors, played by Joanne Farrell
- Lucy Wagner, in the 2002 US teen road comedy-drama film Crossroads, played by Britney Spears (as older Lucy) and Jamie Lynn Spears (as young Lucy)
- Lucy Warbeck, in the UK fantasy comedy Discworld novels
- Lucy Westenra, in the 1897 Irish Gothic horror novel Dracula
- Lucy Willing, in the 2003 steampunk real-time strategy video game Impossible Creatures
- Lucy Kushinada, in the 2022 cyberpunk anime Cyberpunk: Edgerunners

== See also ==
- Loosie
- Lusi (disambiguation)
- Lucey
- Lucia (disambiguation)
- the star BPM 37093, nicknamed "Lucy"
- Lucy the elephant, tourist attraction in Margate, New Jersey, United States
- Lucy (spacecraft)
- Lucy (ship)
