= Lucy Peabody =

Lucy Peabody may refer to:

- Lucy Kaopaulu Peabody (1840–1928), high chiefess and courtier of the Kingdom of Hawaii
- Lucy Whitehead McGill Waterbury Peabody (1861–1949), American Baptist missionary
- Lucy Evelyn Peabody (1864-1934), American conservationist
