= Max Förster =

German scholar of Old English

Max Theodor Wilhelm Förster (8 March 1869 – 10 November 1954) was a German scholar of Old English.

In 1934, Förster was forced to retire from the Ludwig-Maximilians-Universität München (LMU): he was an opponent of the Nazi regime and was married to a Jewish woman and had a Jewish student. He was a visiting professor at Yale University from 1934 to 1936. Wrongly thought to live in the United Kingdom, he was included in The Black Book, a SS list of prominent British residents to be arrested after the invasion of Britain.

Förster was a member of the Saxon and Bavarian Academies of Sciences, an honorary member of the Royal Irish Academy, and a Corresponding Fellow of the British Academy.
