= Lucy Wood =

Lucy Wood may refer to:

- Lucy Felton (née Lucy Wood; born 1985), British fashion journalist from Essex who edited Look (2007–2016)
- Lucy Jane Wood (born 1991), English writer and YouTuber from the Wirral
- Lucy Wood (field hockey) (born 1994), British field hockey player
- Lucy Wood (writer), British short story writer from Cornwall
- Lucy Wood Butler (1820–1895), American pioneer temperance leader
