= Lucy Jane =

Lucy Jane may refer to:

- Lucy Jane Askew (1883–1997), British supercentenarian
- Lucy Jane Bledsoe (born 1957), American novelist
- Lucy Jane Parkinson, British actor and drag king
- Lucy Jane Wood, English writer and YouTuber
