= Lucy Yates =

British suffragist and writer (1863–1935)

Lucy Helen Yates
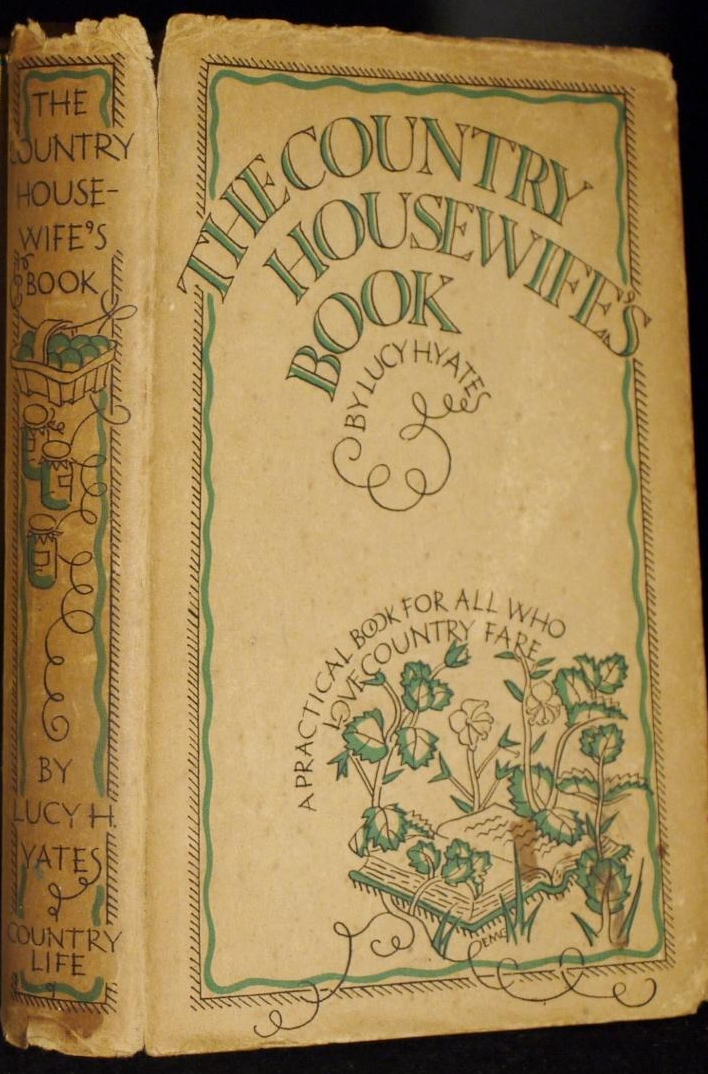
- her last book
- Born: 1863; Basford, Nottinghamshire, England
- Died: 1935 (aged 71–72)
- Occupations: Writer and journalist
- Writing career
- Pen name: L. H. Yates
- Subjects: cookery and finance

Lucy Helen Yates (1863–1935) was a British suffragist and writer on cookery and finance. She left the Pankhursts' Women's Social and Political Union (WSPU) to join the Women's Freedom League.

== Life ==
Yates was born in Basford near Nottingham in 1863. Some of her early writing was for the Girl's Own Paper. She started in 1892 writing about cookery.

Her first book The Profession of Cookery from a French Point of View was about cookery and so was her second. In 1903 she turned to finance in 1903 writing a book for businesswomen titled Management of Money A Handbook of Finance for Women.

In November 1907, Yates joined the mass exodus from the WSPU to join the Women's Freedom League and as a writer it was her job to explain the difference between the two organisations. She wrote that the WFL was democratic and they did not interrupt cabinet ministers as the WSPU were known to do. She was an assistant organising secretary of the WFL and she wrote articles for the WFL's paper The Vote.

In 1911, Yates was working for the Daily Mail and she did make a census return (when some suffragists refused to cooperate).

Yates also gave talks at WFL events talking about finance at Caxton Hall. She noted how money was frequently put out of the reach of women. She believed that "the Suffrage movement has developed in women a true appreciation of the importance of the financial side of their Cause, and the desire to get the best possible result from the contents of their war chest".

Yates returned to cookery writing in 1912 with In Camp and Kitchen: A Handy Guide for Emigrants and Settlers.

Yates continued to write for Girls Own Paper on cookery, finance and fiction. In 1929, the year after women gained the vote in Britain, she wrote a series of stories about "Margaret" in Girls Own titled, Margaret's Adventures in Search of a Career; Margaret Turns Pathfinder; Margaret Launches a Canteen; Margaret Becomes a Co Partner and Margaret as the People's Representative.

Her last publication was in 1934 and it was a cookery book that also included wider advice on growing the produce. It was illustrated by Mary Gardiner and titled The Country Housewife’s Book or How to Make the Most of Country Produce and Country Fare.

Yates died in 1935.

== Publications include ==
- The Profession of Cookery from a French Point of View, 1894
- The Convalescent's Diet, 1901.
- Management of Money A Handbook of Finance for Women, 1903
- Business Matters for Women Simply Explained, 1908
- In Camp and Kitchen: A Handy Guide for Emigrants and Settlers, 1912
- What's Good to Eat, 1926
- Marriage on Small Means, 1931
- The Country Housewife’s Book, 1934
