= Lucy Peck =

British entrepreneur and doll maker

Lucy Peck (née Brightman; 1846–1930), influential British doll maker, entrepreneur and proprietor of The Dolls' Home shop in London.

== Life ==
Born Lucy Brightman in Islington, London, on 22 March 1846, to Benjamin (a butcher) and Abigail (née McNamara). It is believed that Lucy attended boarding school and later became a governess. Between 1847 and 1869, Benjamin and Abigail Brightman ran a coffee house and cafe on Duke Street, and then from 1874-1881 at King Street, Portman Square.

In 1876, Lucy married pharmacist Henry Peck. They lived at 6 Derby Street, St Pancras, and they had two children: Ethel Frances Lucy (born August 1877) and Howard (born 1882).

=== The Dolls' Home Shop ===
In 1893, Lucy Peck established the now famous Dolls' Home shop at 131 Regent Street. She had previously had a Dolls' Warehouse at 5 Goodge Street from 1890 to 1892. The Peck family lived in apartments over the Regent Street shop.

Lucy Peck's surviving notebooks record her methods for casting in Plaster of Paris and Modelling Wax. Lucy Peck specialised in portraits of Queen Victoria as a young girl, modelled after painted portraits. She created play dolls with wire mechanisms for moving the eyes. She also created fashionable Victorian figures with layers of clothing, including lace petticoats and corsets, and accessories such as umbrellas and fans.

The lease on the shop expired in 1908, and the Peck family moved to 162 Shepherd's Bush Road. The Dolls' Home re-opened at 215 High Street, Kensington, where Lucy Peck sold a large range of toys, including automata, doll prams, stuffed toys, dolls' houses and lanterns. Many of her toys and novelties, such as Easter Eggs and printed cards, were imported from Germany. Her stock included Jumeau dolls, Lehmann clockwork ostriches, and goo-goo dolls. Despite high turnover, Lucy Peck recorded profits of only £2 per week.

As well as making her own dolls, Lucy Peck employed other prestigious dollmakers, including Richard Montanari, whose parents had won medals at the 1851 Great Exhibition.

By 1914, the shop had moved again to 81 Wigmore Street as a Dolls' Warehouse. After 1918, Peck established a Dolls' Hospital at 306 Earls Court Road. By this time, wax dolls were less popular (bisque dolls were more in demand), and so the demand had shifted from new production to restoration of old items.

By 1922, Lucy Peck was retired, and lived in Wimbledon and then Kingston, where she took up clay modelling at Kingston School of Art. She died on October 20, 1930.
