= Lucy Thomas =

Lucy Thomas may refer to:

- Lucy Thomas (businesswoman) (1781–1847), Welsh businesswoman
- Lucy Thomas (footballer) (born 2000), English professional footballer
- Lucy Thomas (born 2004), British singer from Wigan, Lancashire, England
