= Lucy Robinson =

Lucy Robinson may refer to:

== Television ==
- Lucy Robinson (actress) (born 1966), British actress
- Lucy Robinson (Neighbours), a character from the Australian soap opera Neighbours
- Lucy Robinson, British television producer of sitcom Pramface

== Others ==
- Lucy Robinson (historian), British academic
- Lucy Robinson (wheelchair basketball) (born 1999), British wheelchair basketball player
