= Lucy Hutyra =

American urban ecologist

- Education: University of Washington; Harvard University
- Scientific career
- Workplaces: University of Washington; Harvard University; Boston University; Yale University
- Thesis: Carbon and water exchange in Amazonian rainforests (2007)

Lucy Hutyra is an American urban ecologist who is a professor of earth and environment at Boston University. Her research uses a multi-disciplinary approach to understand the terrestrial carbon cycle. She was named a MacArthur Fellow in 2023.

== Early life and education ==
Hutyra was an undergraduate student in forest ecology at the University of Washington. She moved to Yale University as a graduate researcher, where she spent a year doing fieldwork. She moved to Harvard University, where she completed a master's degree and doctorate in earth sciences. Her doctoral work investigated water exchange in the Amazonian rainforest. After earning her doctorate, Hutyra returned to the University of Washington, where she spent two years as a research scientist learning about urban ecology.

== Research and career ==
In 2009, Hutyra joined the faculty at Boston University as an assistant professor. She was promoted to associate professor in 2015 and professor in 2021. That year she was also appointed Director of the Biogeosciences Programme.

Hutyra's research considers anthropogenic carbon dioxide and how urbanization impacts ecosystem characteristics. Her early work looked to quantify how the ecosystem productivity and dynamics change across urban and rural domains, map historical to contemporary patterns of landcover and develop strategies to scale her investigations and understanding. She became interested in how local and regional ecology contribute to carbon fluxes, and has demonstrated that they absorb and emit carbon in different ways depending on their surrounding soils. She has investigated how human-made boundaries and naturally occurring boundaries affect tree growth and carbon uptake.

In 2017, Hutrya joined the NASA Federal Advisory Committee on Earth Sciences, where she focused on carbon cycles. She is actively fighting to combat climate by reducing carbon emissions, starting in Boston where she currently works.

Hutyra's research has been instrumental in understanding how urban forests contribute to carbon sequestration, particularly in densely populated cities like Boston, where she has conducted extensive studies on tree growth and atmospheric carbon absorption.

== Awards and honors ==
- 2012 National Science Foundation CAREER Award
- 2016 National Academy of Sciences, Kavli Fellow
- 2016 Harvard University Charles Bullard Fellowship
- 2022 Dean's Award for Excellence in Graduate Education
- 2023 MacArthur Fellow

== Selected publications ==
- Karen C Seto; Burak Güneralp; Lucy R Hutyra (17 September 2012). "Global forecasts of urban expansion to 2030 and direct impacts on biodiversity and carbon pools". Proceedings of the National Academy of Sciences of the United States of America. 109 (40): 16083–16088. Bibcode:2012PNAS..10916083S. doi:10.1073/pnas.1211658109. ISSN 0027-8424. PMC 3479537. PMID 22988086. Wikidata Q34417488.
- Alfredo R. Huete; Kamel Didan; Yosio E. Shimabukuro; et al. (2006). "Amazon rainforests green-up with sunlight in dry season". Geophysical Research Letters. 33 (6). Bibcode:2006GeoRL..33.6405H. doi:10.1029/2005gl025583. ISSN 0094-8276. Wikidata Q56336384.
- Scott R Saleska; Scott D Miller; Daniel M Matross; et al. (1 November 2003). "Carbon in Amazon forests: unexpected seasonal fluxes and disturbance-induced losses". Science. 302 (5650): 1554–1557. Bibcode:2003Sci...302.1554S. doi:10.1126/science.1091165. ISSN 0036-8075. PMID 14645845. Wikidata Q57190441.

== Advocacy and Mentorship ==
Beyond her research, Hutyra is actively involved in mentoring students and early-career scientists, advocating for more diversity in environmental sciences and supporting initiatives that bridge the gap between academia and public policy.
