= Lucy Montgomery =

Lucy Montgomery may refer to:

- Lucy Maud Montgomery (1874–1942), Canadian fiction writer
- Lucy Montgomery (actress) (born 1975), English actress, comedian, and writer
- Lucy Montgomery (As the World Turns), a fictional character in As the World Turns
