= Lucy Ann =

Lucy Ann or Lucy Anne may refer to:

- Lucy Ann Brooks (1835–1926), English temperance advocate
- Lucy Ann Cox (1826/1827–1891), American Civil War nurse and cook
- Lucy Ann Decker (1822–1890), American wife of Mormon president Brigham Young
- Lucy Ann Hawley Skidmore (1821–1853), American mother of college founder Lucy Skidmore Scribner
- Lucy Ann Johnson (born 1935), American-Canadian formerly missing woman
- Lucy Ann Kidd-Key (1839–1916), American educator and music college administrator
- Lucy-Ann McFadden (born 1952), American astronomer and planetary scientist
- Lucy Ann Polk (1927–2011), American jazz singer
- Lucy Anne FitzGerald (1771–1851), Anglo-Irish politician and writer
- Lucy-Anne Holmes, British author, actress, and campaigner
- Lucy Anne Rogers Butler (1841–1906), Canadian writer and social justice advocate

== See also ==
- Lucy Ann (1810 ship), Canadian trading vessel
