= Lucy Hartley =

British academic

Lucy Hartley is a British professor of English attached to the Department of English Language and Literature of the University of Michigan. Her special interests include nineteenth-century studies, intellectual and cultural history, art and politics, history and philosophy of science and interdisciplinarity theory and practice.

== Writing ==
Hartley is the author of two books.

Physiognomy and the Meaning of Expression in Nineteenth-Century Culture (2001) explores the concepts of physiognomy and eugenics and raises questions about what are "legitimate" sciences. She describes how "the appeal of physiognomy lay not so much in any of its scientific pretension but rather in how it seemed to validate an already widespread cultural conviction."

Democratising Beauty in Nineteenth-Century Britain: Art and the Politics of Public Life was published by Cambridge University Press, 2017.
