= Lucy Foulkes =

British academic, psychologist and writer

- Occupations: Academic, writer, science communicator

Academic background
- Education: University of Birmingham; University College London

Academic work
- Discipline: Psychology
- Sub-discipline: Mental health and social development in adolescence, negative consequences of mental health awareness
- Institutions: University College London; University of York; University of Oxford
- Main interests: Adolescent mental health
- Notable works: What Mental Illness Really Is (…and what it isn’t); Coming Of Age: How Adolescence Shapes Us
- Website: lucyfoulkes.com

Lucy Foulkes is a British academic psychologist and writer, specialising in adolescent mental health and social development. She is currently a Prudence Trust Research Fellow at the Department of Experimental Psychology of the University of Oxford.

== Biography ==
Foulkes completed her PhD (2011–2015) and postdoc (2015–2017) at the University College London, before moving to the University of York for a lectureship, and later to the University of Oxford. Besides her research at Oxford, she is also an honorary lecturer at University College London and a senior research fellow for the Anna Freud National Centre for Children and Families. Her main interests are adolescent mental health, the unintended effects of mental health awareness, and self-diagnosis of mental health problems and its relationship to adolescent identity development. She also researches the effectiveness of school mental health interventions.

She has argued that mental health awareness may in some cases increase mental health problems. In a publication with Jack Andrews, she has laid out the Prevalence Inflation Hypothesis, which reasons that awareness can lead to overinterpretation of mild distress as a major mental health problem.

Foulkes contributes to public science communication and public discourse on adolescent mental health, through media appearances, news articles, podcasts, interviews and books. Her first book, What Mental Illness Really Is (…and what it isn’t), was released in 2021. Her second book, Coming Of Age: How Adolescence Shapes Us, was released in 2024.

== Books ==
- Foulkes, L. (2021). What Mental Illness Really Is (…and what it isn’t). Vintage.
- Foulkes, L. (2024). Coming Of Age: How Adolescence Shapes Us. Vintage.
