= Lucy Hosking =

Australian geoscientist

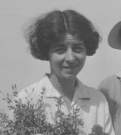
- Lucy Hosking c1928
- Born: 1904
- Died: 1996 (aged 91–92)
- Education: University of Western Australia
- Scientific career
- Fields: Geologist
- Workplaces: University of Western Australia

Lucy Florence Victoria Hosking (1904 – 1996) was a geoscientist from Western Australia and represents Australia's pioneering female scientists.

== Career ==
Since 1924, Hosking was a demonstrator, showing fossils and, in 1931, became an Assistant Lecturer in Geology and the first woman appointed to a permanent position at the University of Western Australia (UWA) between 1931 and 1933.

Hosking published five papers on Palaeontology and performed early research on Paleozoic Brachiopoda of the Kimberley, Carnarvon and Geraldton regions of Western Australia and co-authored two books. One of Hosking's most important contributions is her publication on the Devonian rocks of the Kimberley region of north-west Western Australia. Her insights were produced by analysing field notes and reports produced by Arthur Wade, palaeontologist from the Freyey Oil Company, and two collections of fossils: Minyu Gap specimens courtesy of Torrington Blatchford and Henry William Beamish Talbot (geologists from the Geological Survey of Western Australia) in 1929, and Barker Gorge specimens collected by Allan Thomas Wells in 1922. Both collections are deposited in the UWA Geological Collection (currently the Edward de Courcy Clarke Earth Science Museum of the UWA).

After Hosking married, she resigned her career as a geoscientist.

Outside of geology, Hosking was also a fan of dramatic art and won a bachelor's degree in arts from the UWA in 1925.

The Royal Society of Western Australia sponsors a Memorial Award in her name.

== Selected works ==
- E. d. C. Clarke, C. Hadley, L. F. V. Hosking, Junior physiography and geology : an elementary text book for Western Australian schools. (Carroll's Ltd Printers and Publishers, Perth, Western Australia, 1932), pp. 268.
- Hosking, L. F. (1931). Fossils from the Wooramel District, Western Australia. Journal of Proceedings of the Royal Society of Western Australia, 27, 7-52.
- Hosking, L. F. (1933). Specific Naming of Aulosteges from West. Australia. Jour. Roy. Soc, 19, 33.
- Hosking, L. F. (1933). Distribution of Devonian Rocks in the Kimberley Division: And, Description of a Recent Collection of Devonian Fossils from the Kimberley Division. Royal Society of Western Australia.
