= Lucy Katz =

American legal academic

Lucy Chanin Katz
- Birth: February 7, 1943
- Death: February 9, 2013 (aged 70)
- Parents: Charles (Chatzinoff) Chanin and Sylvia (Fromm) Chanin

Lucy Chanin Katz was an American lawyer who was the Robert C. Wright Professor of Business Law, Ethics, and Dispute Resolution at Fairfield University in Fairfield, Connecticut.

Lucy Chanin Katz came from an Ashkenazi Jewish background. Her father's family, the Chatzinoffs (her father had changed his name to Chanin after marrying her mother) came from Belarus. Her mother's family, the Fromms and the Ritters, came from modern-day Western-Poland and Warsaw. During her time in Fairfield Lucy was connected with the local Humanistic shul.

Katz held a bachelor's in Government from Smith College and earned her juris doctor degree from New York University School of Law. She was a member of the Academy of Legal Studies in Business. Before coming to Fairfield she practiced law with Koskoff, Koskoff and Bieder in Bridgeport, Connecticut.
