= Lucy May =

Lucy May may refer to:

- Lucy May Barker (born 1992), English actress
- Lucy May Boring (1886–1996), American psychologist
- Lucy May Stanton (1875–1931), American painter
- Lucy-May Popple, from the Japanese anime series Lucy-May of the Southern Rainbow, voiced by Minori Matsushima
- Lucy May, a Thoroughbred racehorse, winner of the 1881 Kentucky Oaks
