= Lucy E. Salyer =

American historian

Lucy E. Salyer is a professor of history at the University of New Hampshire known for her work on the history of immigration law in the United States.

She authored Laws Harsh as Tigers: Chinese Immigrants and the Shaping of Modern Immigration Law, which won the Theodore Saloutos Book Award for the best book on immigration history. Harsh as Tigers explores the origin of American immigration law in the late 19th and early 20th century.

Under the Starry Flag: How a Band of Irish Americans Joined the Fenian Revolt and Sparked a Crisis over Citizenship (Cambridge: Belknap Press of Harvard University Press, 2018) explores the concept of legal expatriation, the idea that an individual can legally cease to be a citizen of their birth state by immigrating to and becoming a citizen of a different state.

== Selected works ==
- Salyer, Lucy E. (2000). Laws Harsh As Tigers: Chinese Immigrants and the Shaping of Modern Immigration Law. Univ of North Carolina Press. ISBN 978-0-8078-6431-9.
- Salyer, Lucy E. (2018). Under the Starry Flag: How a Band of Irish Americans Joined the Fenian Revolt and Sparked a Crisis over Citizenship. Harvard University Press. ISBN 978-0-674-05763-0.
- Salyer, Lucy E. (1 December 2004). "Baptism by Fire: Race, Military Service, and U.S. Citizenship Policy, 1918-1935". Journal of American History. 91 (3): 847–876. doi:10.2307/3662858. JSTOR 3662858.
- Salyer, Lucy E. (1991). "The Constitutive Nature of Law in American History". Legal Studies Forum. 15 (1): 61–64.
- Salyer, Lucy E. (2021). "Reconstructing the Immigrant: The Naturalization Act of 1870 in Global Perspective". The Journal of the Civil War Era. 11 (3): 382–405. doi:10.1353/cwe.2021.0050. S2CID 239728064. Project MUSE 803637.
- Salyer, Lucy E. (1 April 2022). "A Nation of Immigrants Reconsidered: US Society in An Age of Restriction, 1924–1965". Journal of American Ethnic History. 41 (3): 118–120. doi:10.5406/19364695.41.3.07. S2CID 247963489.
