= Lucy Allan =

Lucy Allan or Lucy Allen may refer to:

- Lucy Allan (politician) (born 1964), British politician
- Lucy Allan (producer) (born 1978), British television producer
- Lucy T. Allen (born 1941), former Democratic member of the North Carolina General Assembly
- Lucy Grace Allen (1867–1966), American cookery teacher and author
- Lucy Allen Smart (1877–1960), American librarian and curator
