= Lucy Hamilton =

Lucy Hamilton may refer to:

- Lucy Hamilton (cricketer) (born 2006), Australian cricketer
- Lucy Hamilton (musician), American singer
- Lucy Hamilton Hooper (1835–1893), American poet, journalist, editor, playwright, and translator
