= Lucy Ward =

Lucy Ward may refer to:

- Lucy Geneviève Teresa Ward (1837–1922), American-born British countess, soprano singer, and actress
- Lucy Ward (footballer) (born 1974), English broadcaster and former footballer
- Lucy Ward (musician), English folk singer, guitarist, and concertina player
- Lucy Ward, British journalist

== See also ==
- Lucy Ward Stebbins (1880–1955), Dean of Women at University of California, Berkeley
