= Lucy Bradshaw =

Lucy Bradshaw may refer to:

- Lucy Bradshaw (actress), British actress
- Lucy Bradshaw (game developer), American game developer
