= Lucy Morgan (disambiguation) =

Lucy Morgan may refer to

- Lucy Morgan (1940–2023), American reporter and editor
- Lucy Calista Morgan (1889–1981), American weaver and teacher; founder of the Penland School of Crafts
- Lucy Morgan, member of Dexys Midnight Runners
- Lucy Morgan (ice hockey) (born 2001), American PWHL player
