= Lucy Stanton =

Lucy Stanton may refer to:

- Lucy Celesta Stanton (1816–1878), Mormon woman who married and followed William McCary
- Lucy May Stanton (1875–1931), American painter
- Lucy Stanton (abolitionist) (1831–1910), African American abolitionist and activist
