= Lucy Wicks =

Lucy Wicks may refer to:

- Lucy Wicks (politician) (born 1973), Australian politician
- Lucy Wicks (volleyball) (born 1982), British volleyballer
