= Lucy Gray (disambiguation) =

"Lucy Gray" is a 1799 poem by William Wordsworth.

Lucy Gray may also refer to:

- Lucy Gray (activist) (born 2006), New Zealand climate change activist and singer-songwriter
- Lucy Gray (album), 2007 album by Envy on the Coast
- Lucy Gray Baird, in the 2020 US dystopian young adult action-adventure novel The Ballad of Songbirds and Snakes
- Lucy Gray, designer of the Laser Kiwi flag for the New Zealand flag referendums

== See also ==
- Lucy Gray Mountains, a mountain range in Nevada, United States
