= Lucy Beaumont =

Lucy Beaumont may refer to:

- Lucy Beaumont (actress) (1869–1937), English actress
- Lucy Beaumont (comedian) (born 1983), English stand-up comedian
