= Lucy Griffiths =

Lucy Griffiths is the name of:

- Lucy Griffiths (actress, born 1919) (1919–1982), English actress
- Lucy Griffiths (actress, born 1986), English actress
