= Lucy Wanapuyngu =

Australian Gapuwiyak artist

- Born: 1 July 1955 (age 70); Mainoru Station, Northern Territory, Australia
- Spouse: Ian Wurruwul

Lucy Malirrimurruwuy Armstrong Wanapuyngu (born 1 July 1955) is an Aboriginal Australian master fibre artist. She is an elder of the Gapuwiyak community, and is heavily involved in the transmission of knowledge dealing with fibre works. She has worked with anthropologist Louise Hamby, since 1995, and many of her works have been spotlighted at different art festivals, collections, galleries, and museums.

== Biography ==
Lucy Malirrimurruwuy Armstrong Wanapuyngu was born on 1 July 1955 at the Mainoru cattle station in the Northern Territory of Australia. After living in Mainoru for four years, she moved to the Roper River area. She lived in Roper River for eight years. During this time of her life, she became ill and was not able to walk. Community elders looked after her. Someone called Nancy was taking care of her until a doctor from Adelaide visited Roper River and addressed her medical needs. Some of her family members then moved to join her in Roper River: Djardi, Florence Bertie, Vera, and Sam Ashley. After some time, they moved to Galiwin'ku (Elcho Island), and this is where Lucy met her husband, Ian Wurruwul. After marrying Wurruwul, the couple had five children before moving to Gapuwiyak, also known as Lake Evella. Since then, they have had five grandchildren. Because of her fibre practice, Wanapuyngu has been able to travel the world and lead workshops teaching the cultural significance fibre has to her community.

== Career ==
Since childhood, Wanapuyngu has been exposed to fibre art. Many of the traditions involved in fibre works symbolize the sanctity of motherhood in Yolngu culture. Basket making and other forms of fibre art have also been important to the women of Yolngu culture. The older women of the community pass down the knowledge to the younger generation. Through frequent family gatherings, knowledge about harvesting, preparation of specific plant materials, and craft skills continue to be passed on and adapted from one generation to the next. Wanapuyngu was responsible for teaching many family members, including her sisters and children, how to make specific dyes along with complex fibre techniques.

In 2001, the exhibition "Art on a String" opened at Object Gallery in Sydney, Australia. This exhibition highlighted Wanapuyngu's work with string jewellery. Jewellery such as necklaces are a crucial component of Aboriginal Australian culture. Traditionally, it was customary for necklaces to be worn by both men and women. Things like shells, feathers, grasses, reeds, plant seeds, dried fruit, snake vertebrae, and other materials which are found in the desert and coastal regions of Australia can all be used in necklace making.

Wanapuyngu has also been a participant and held workshops at the Selling Yarns Conferences. The first conference was held in 2006, the second in 2009, and the third in 2013. This series focused on investigating the best and most sustainable practices within the Indigenous textile industry, the relevance of mentorship and networking, creating strategic alliances between Indigenous communities across Australia, and sharing cross-cultural exchanges with international artists, curators and researchers who have placed Australian Indigenous textile practice within the broader international arena.

In 2010, her work was featured in the exhibition "Women With Clever Hands Gapuwiyak Miyalkurruwurr Gong Djambatjmala". She assisted Louise Hamby with the curation process. This exhibit was the first time the women of Gapuwiyak presented a collection of their creative work in fibre. The works included in this exhibition reflected the intricacies of their land and their culture. Workshops led by Wanapuyngu and other Gapuwiyak women were hosted to educate others about their traditions.

In 2011, her work Healthy food from the past won the 2011 Highly Commended Wandjuk Marika 3D Memorial Award at the Telstra National Aboriginal & Torres Strait Islander Art Awards (NATSIAA) hosted by the Museum and Art Gallery of the Northern Territory. The NATSIAA exhibition continuously showcases contemporary Indigenous artistic practices, and the innovations constantly being made by Aboriginal and Torres Strait Islander people.

In 2013, Wanapuyngu had work exhibited in the Second International Triennale of Kogei in Kanazawa, Japan. This exhibition explored the manifestation of “regional character” in kogei, craft, and presented works of folk art, indigenous art, contemporary kogei, and design from Australia, Santa Fe, Taiwan, and various regions of Japan. The main goal of this exhibition was to compare the critical elements found in the arts of regions around the world. Four regions of the world were presented, each having their own cultural and historical background. This exhibition was a sequel to the First International Triennale of Kogei in Kanazawa. That same year, Wanapuyngu attended the Bark Workshop, one of the many workshops of the Harvesting Traditional Knowledge Project, hosted by the Association of Northern Kimberley and Arnhem Aboriginal Artists in partnership with the Buku-Larrnggay Mulka Centre and the Centre for Cultural Materials Conservation at the University of Melbourne. The goal of this two-year project is to bring together Indigenous artists from homelands and communities in northern Australia and the conservators who look after the art from these regions held in collections of public museums and galleries across Australia. This workshop brought together the process of harvesting, preparing, and conserving barks and pandanus, dyes, ochres and other natural materials. Wanapuyngu along with other senior weavers such as Ruth Nalmakarra from Milingimbi and Lorrie Murburrk from Maningrida worked together to educate scholars on the use of pandanus in fibre work and bush string making.

During August 2013, Wanapuyngu and Dr. Hamby gave a talk discussing their 2010 collaborate exhibition "Women With Clever Hands Gapuwiyak Miyalkurruwurr Gong Djambatjmala", at the University of Queensland. Wanapuyngu and Hamby discussed how many of the items in the exhibition are no longer necessities of life. Plastic containers, tins, pillowcases, mail bags, and handbags all act as replacements for the ceremonial items made by the community's ancestors, but the older generation of women still craft these items. Some fibre works are used for ceremony, some are made to teach the younger generations about past practices, but the majority of them are sold.

=== Kluge-Ruhe Aboriginal Art Collection ===
From July 2019 to April 2020, the exhibition "With Her Hands: Women’s Fiber Art from Gapuwiyak: The Louise Hamby Gift" has been on display at the Kluge-Ruhe Aboriginal Art Collection in Charlottesville. This exhibition features 100 artworks recently donated by Hamby that address topics of tradition and innovation, gender roles, generational change and relationships to place. Many of Wanapuyngu's works were included in this collection, such as baskets, necklaces, and gay’wu, string bags. During creation of the Hamby Collection, Wanapuyngu and her daughter, Anna, were consulted by Hamby. In July 2019, Wanapuyngu, along with her daughter and grandson, Ryan, were able to visit the Kluge-Ruhe in Charlottesville for three weeks, during which they helped the curation team at the Kluge-Ruhe and led workshops for visitors of the exhibition.

== Collections ==
- Art Gallery of New South Wales
- The Louise Hamby Collection at the Kluge-Ruhe Aboriginal Art Collection of the University of Virginia

== Selected exhibitions ==
- Art on a String (2001)
- Women with Clever Hands: Gapuwiyak Miyalkurruwurr Djambatjmala (2010)
- Telstra National Aboriginal (2011)
- Torres Strait Islander Art Awards (2013)
- 2nd International Triennale of Craft in Kanazawa, Japan (2013)
- With Her Hands: Women's Fiber Art From Gapuwiyak (2019–2020)
