= Lucy Moore =

Lucy Moore may be:

- Lucy Moore (archaeologist), British archaeologist and Wikipedia editor
- Lucy Moore (botanist) (1906–1987), New Zealand botanist
- Lucy Moore (historian) (born 1970), British historian
