= Lucy Russell =

Lucy Russell may refer to:

- Lucy Russell, Countess of Bedford (1580–1627), patron of the arts in the Elizabethan and Jacobean eras
- Lucy Russell (actress) (born 1972), English actress
