= Lucy M. Maltby =

Lucy Mary Maltby (1900–1984) started the Pyrex Test Kitchen at Corning Glass Works.

She was born in Corning, New York. Maltby received her B.S. at Cornell, her M.A. at Iowa State, and her Ph.D. in home economics at Syracuse.

== Early career ==
In 1929, Maltby was a home economics professor at Mansfield State Teachers College in Pennsylvania.

== Pyrex Test Kitchen ==
Maltby started the Pyrex® Test Kitchen at Corning Glass Works in 1929 and ran it until her retirement in 1965. The Pyrex® Test Kitchen played a large role in product development.

- The Pyrex Test Kitchen employees tested many consumer products, including alumino-silicate glass cookware for the stove-top, that would eventually be known as "flameware". In 1932, market studies showed that there was an interest in 10-inch diameter glass skillets. However, at that time, stove manufacturers were producing 6-inch and 8-inch electric ranges. When these glass skillets were set upon a 6- or 8-inch heating element, a hot spot would develop in the center of the skillet while the rim remained cold, and the skillets were prone to breakage due to thermal stress. Even though the expensive 10-inch skillet molds had already been made and the market studies showed that consumers wanted them, this demonstration of the 10-inch skillets' failure led to the recommendation that 6-inch skillets be produced.
