= Lucy Cox =

Lucy Cox may refer to:

- Lucy Cox (artist) (born 1988), British abstract painter and curator
- Lucy Middleton (née Cox) (1894–1983), Labour politician
