= Lucy Mary =

Lucy Mary may refer to:

- Lucy Mary Agnes Hickenlooper, birth name of Olga Samaroff (1880–1948), American pianist, music critic, and teacher
- Lucy Mary Cavanagh (1871–1936), American botanist and plant collector
- Lucy Mary Silcox (1862–1947), English headteacher and feminist
