= Lucy Campbell =

Lucy Campbell may refer to:

- Lucy Campbell (actress), in Land of the Dead (2005)
- Lucy Campbell (mathematician), Barbadian-Canadian applied mathematician
- Lucy Campbell (screenwriter), Australian writer of the sci-fi feature Monolith (2022)

== See also ==
- Lucie Campbell (1885–1963), American gospel music composer and director, educator, and social justice advocate
