= Lucy Pearson =

Lucy Pearson may refer to:

- Lucy Pearson (politician) (born 1930), former Canadian senator and children's rights advocate
- Lucy Pearson (cricketer) (born 1972), English cricketer
