= Lucy Hiller Lambert Cleveland =

American writer, diarist and traveller in the 18th century in Cleveland

Lucy Hiller Lambert Cleveland (1780–1866) was an American writer, diarist, traveller, artist, and social reformer. She was a significant folk artist of antebellum America, as well as writing and illustrating over a dozen children's books.

== Life ==
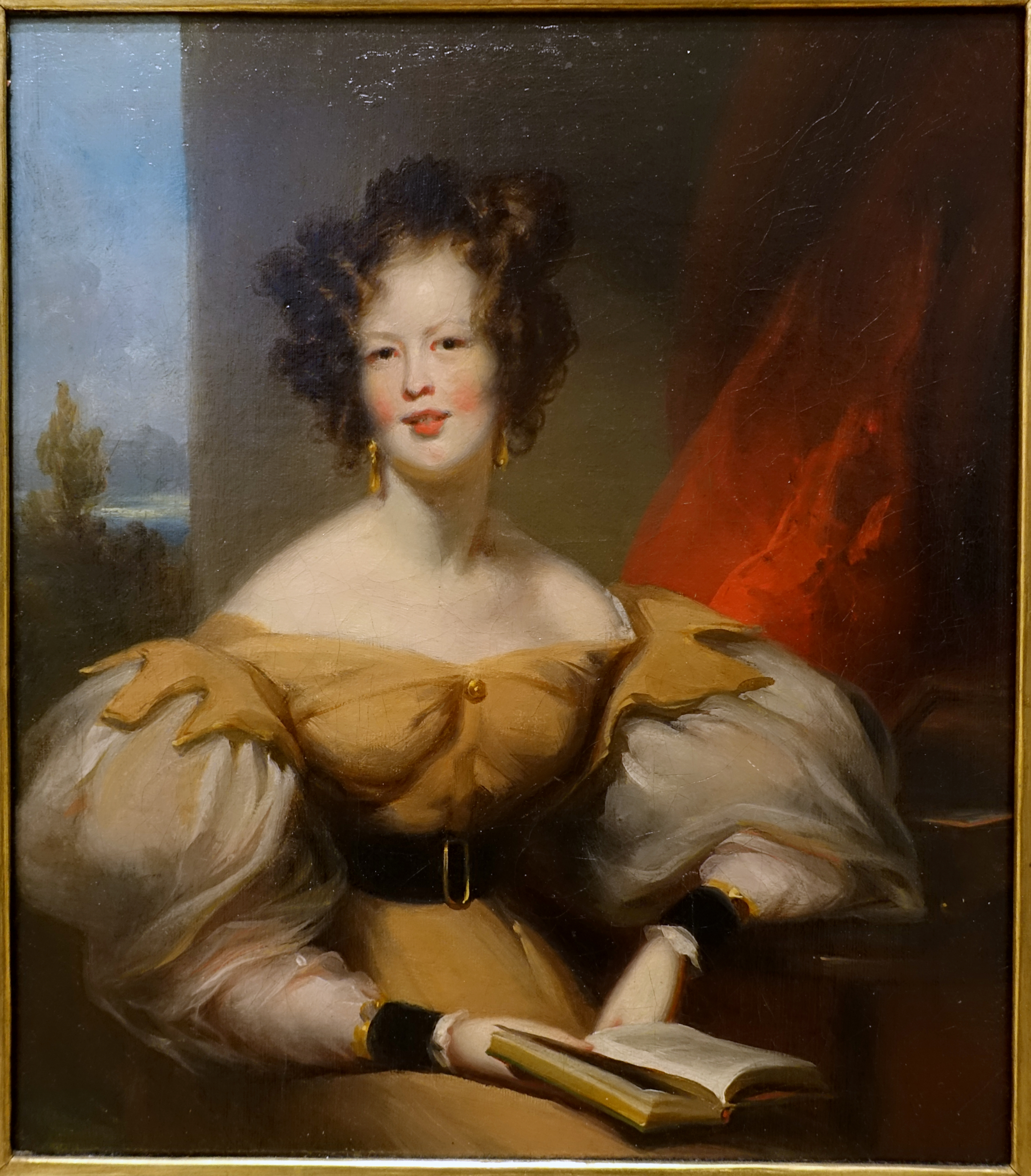
Harriet Low, who the Clevelands met in Macau.

Lucy Hiller was born in Salem, Massachusetts, in 1780, the youngest daughter of Major Joseph Hiller (1748–1814), a clockmaker and silversmith, and Margaret Cleveland Hiller (1748–1804). In 1803, the family moved to Lancaster, Massachusetts, where Lucy married Captain William Lambert in 1806. She was widowed just a year later, and returned to Salem to live with her older sisters, Dorcas and Mary, who had married brothers. Lucy's father died in 1814, followed by her sister Mary in 1815. The next year, Lucy married her widowed brother-in-law, Captain William Cleveland.

The couple moved to Salem in 1821, William active in the maritime trade, and Lucy as an author of books for children. In November 1828, Lucy, along with her stepson James Cleveland, boarded the Zephyr, and embarked on a trading voyage with William Cleveland to Timor, where he was travelling to acquire sandalwood, for sale in China. A passport issued for the trip survives. The trip lasted just under a year, during which time Lucy kept a travel diary, and an illustrated sketchbook. Her two dozen sketches depicted scenes of everyday life in and around Timor and Macau. In Macau, the group encountered their fellow American, the writer Harriet Low, who described the meeting in her own diary.

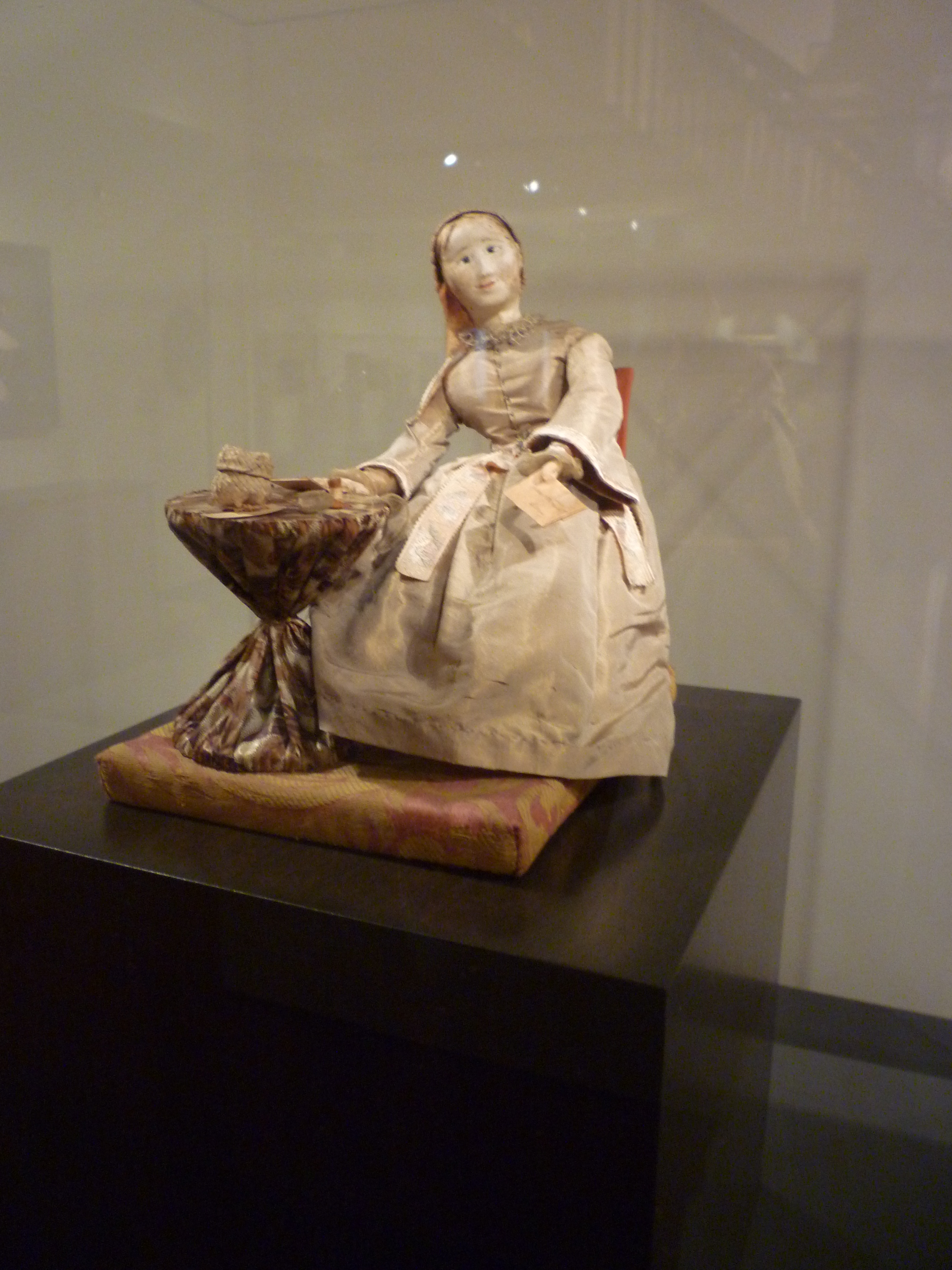
The Letter by Lucy Hiller Cleveland. Salem, Massachusetts, USA. Cotton, wool, and other materials.

Between 1827 and 1842, Lucy Hiller Cleveland wrote, illustrated, and anonymously published over a dozen books for children, on topics including temperance, abolition, and 'social benevolence'. As well as writing, Cleveland also produced a number of folk sculpture 'vignettes', showing various scenes of American life. She entered these 'figures of rags' into a number of charitable fairs. In 1844, aged 64, she was awarded a diploma by the Mechanics' Literary Association of Rochester, New York, for the best "Specimen of Figures of Rags". In 1852, an entry into the Shirtwoman's Union Fair in New York City raised twenty dollars to assist women garment workers.

From the 1830s to 1860s, Cleveland made at least eleven vignettes, using a wide range of materials, including cotton, silk, wool, leather, and human hair. She embellished them with beads, glass, embroidery, and paint. Aimee E. Newell quotes from a letter Cleveland wrote to her stepson, in which she describes her enjoyment of the process:

I have been quite at my old trade since here stuffing + dressing, and 'hiking into shape'... It gives great satisfaction.

Cleveland spent much of her life caring for sick and ailing relatives, and Newell notes that some of her vignettes likely drew on this experience, particularly in depicting the sick room. Towards the end of her life, Cleveland kept a book of poems, in which she wrote regarding her own thoughts, as well as to mark the special occasions of friends and family members.

Lucy Hiller Lambert Cleveland died in 1866 at the age of 86. Works of hers are held by the Peabody Essex Museum in Salem, as are her albums and manuscripts.

== Bibliography ==
- The little girl who was taught by experience (1827)
- The black velvet bracelet (1828)
- The closet (1828)
- Early impressions (1828)
- Original moral tales: intended for children and young persons, containing Temptation (1828)
- Annette Warington, or, Sequel to The black velvet bracelet (1832)
- The adventures of Willson Avery (1833)
- Clara Newgent, or, The progress of improvement: a tale (1833)
- The unveiled heart: a simple story (1835)
- The carpenter and his family: also, Pride subdued (1835)
