= Lucy Hope =

Lucy Hope may refer to:

- Lucy Hope (swimmer) (born 1997), Scottish elite swimmer
- Lucy Hope (footballer) (born 1996), Scottish footballer
