= Lucy Meacham Thruston =

American writer of historical novels (1862–1938)

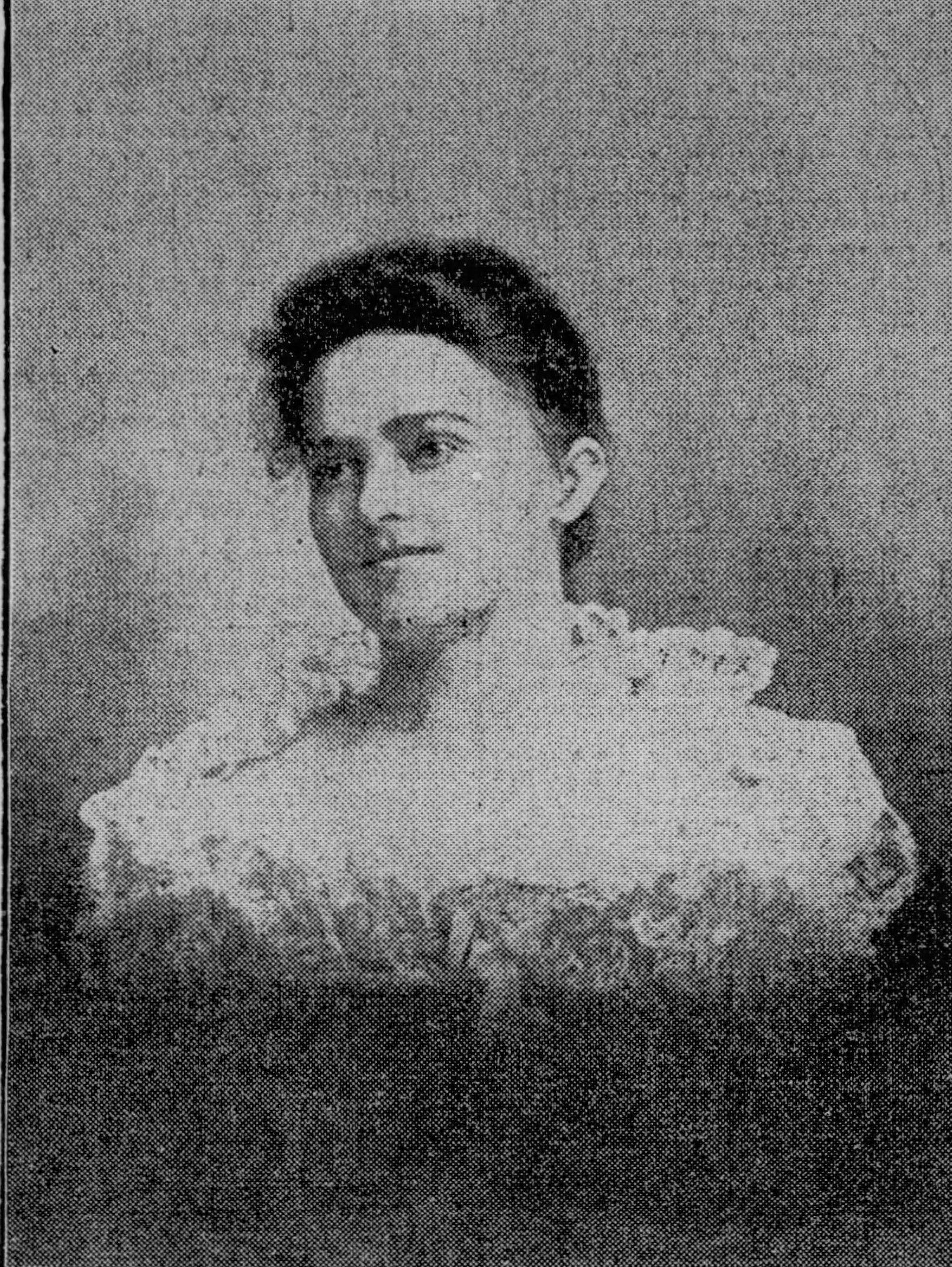
- Born: Lucy Meacham Kidd; March 29, 1862; King and Queen County, Virginia
- Died: November 27, 1938 (aged 76); Maryland General Hospital
- Education: Towson University
- Occupation: Historical novelist
- Spouse: Julius Thruston
- Children: 2

Lucy Meacham Thruston (March 29, 1862 – November 27, 1938) was a writer of historical novels set in the Chesapeake Bay region.

== Life and career ==
She was born Lucy Meacham Kidd on March 29, 1862, in King and Queen County, Virginia, the daughter of John Meacham and Elizabeth Rebecca (Adams) Kidd. She moved to Baltimore, Maryland, when she was twelve years old. She was privately educated in Virginia and graduated Maryland State Normal School in 1880. She married Julius Thruston on Valentine's Day, 1887.

Her first book was an illustrated collection of poetry called Songs of the Chesapeake (1900). Thruston wrote a series of popular historical novels set mostly in Maryland and Virginia, in various periods including colonial America, the War of 1812, and the American Civil War. Her novels were celebratory; she said "I think we should be proud of the dangers they braved and the laws and constitution they handed down to us." She also wrote stories and historical pieces for newspapers and magazines and lectured on various topics.

Thruston was a Quaker and worked on behalf of the American Friends Service Committee. In the late 1920s and early 1930s, she provided a news service that sent hundreds of articles about peace biweekly to about 450 mostly rural newspapers in the mid-Atlantic region and created a biweekly newsletter, The Trend of World Affairs, sent to about two thousand teachers and clubwomen.

After her husband died in 1920, she lived with her daughter Augusta. After a fall at her home, she was taken to Maryland General Hospital, where she died of her injuries on November 27, 1938. Her other daughter, Elizabeth Thruston Leake, married historian James Miller Leake and became an educator at the University of Florida.

== Bibliography ==
- Songs of the Chesapeake, 1900
- Mistress Brent: A Story of Lord Baltimore's Colony in 1638, 1901
- A Girl of Virginia, 1902
- Jack and His Island: A Boy’s Adventures along the Chesapeake in the War of 1812, 1902
- Where the Tide Comes In. 1904
- Called to the Field: A Story of Virginia in the Civil War, 1906
- Jenifer, 1907
- The Heavens of the Unexpected, 1910
