= Lucy Zhang =

American mechanical engineer

- Citizenship: United States
- Education: Northwestern University
- Board member of: US Association of Computational Mechanics; International Association of Computational Mechanics; American Physical Society; Society of Women Engineers
- Engineering career
- Discipline: Mechanical engineering
- Employers: Rensselaer Polytechnic Institute; Tulane University (2003-2006)
- Projects: Biomechanics; Multiphysics/multiscale coupling; Data science in mechanics; Multiscale interfacial mechanisms
- Awards: ASME Fellow (2002)
- Website: www.lucy-t-zhang.org/home

Lucy T. Zhang is an American mechanical engineer whose research concerns computational mechanics, including problems involving solid-liquid interfaces, multi-scale simulation, and biomechanics. She is a professor in the Department of Mechanical, Aerospace and Nuclear Engineering at the Rensselaer Polytechnic Institute, where she also serves as associate dean for research innovations, partnerships, and workforce development.

Zhang graduated from Binghamton University in New York State in 1997. She continued her studies at Northwestern University, where she received a master's degree and completed her Ph.D. She became an assistant professor at Tulane University in New Orleans, from 2003 until 2006, when Hurricane Katrina led to the shutdown of many university programs including the mechanical engineering department; she then moved to her present position at Rensselaer Polytechnic Institute. She has also served as a program director at the National Science Foundation before returning to her faculty position at Rensselaer.

She was elected as an ASME Fellow in 2020.
