= Lucy Monaghan =

Northern Irish rape campaigner

- Born: 1989 (age 36–37)
- Known for: Women's rights activist
- Awards: BBC 100 Women (2020)

Lucy Monaghan (born 1989) is a human rights activist from Belfast, Northern Ireland, whose work was recognised by the BBC when she was listed on the annual 100 Women list in 2020.

Monaghan, who was raped in 2015, reported the attack to the police, who decided that they would not prosecute. This led Monaghan to complain to the Police Ombudsman, who upheld her claim and the Police Service of Northern Ireland was subsequently found to have made several failings in their investigation. In coming forward, Monaghan waived her right to anonymity and campaigns against sexual violence. In 2019, she was a participant in the Gillen Review: Report into the law and procedures in serious sexual offences in Northern Ireland, led by former judge John Gillen, which led to over 250 recommendations for changes to the law.
