= Lucy McCormick =

British performance artist and actress

Lucy McCormick is a performance artist and actress in films and stage productions. Her works are a mixture of multiple disciplines, such as performance art, theatre, dance and comedy. One of her most notable works is Triple Threat for which she won the Best Performer Award at the Dublin Fringe Festival in 2017.

McCormick was born in Newcastle, and trained in Acting at East 15.

== Career ==
=== Solo shows ===
==== Triple Threat ====
McCormick's debut headline show, Triple Threat, was an hour-long performance directed by Ursula Martinez Together with two supporting dancers who she calls her Girl Squad, McCormick performed a retelling of the New Testament where she played Jesus alongside other roles. It was made to be a spectacle with absurd art, dancers and pop songs. The show explores gender dynamics in society and how they are not only a disadvantage to women but also often violent to women. The show started out as multiple separate cabaret acts she had performed at club nights like Duckie. After her debut at the Edinburgh Festival Fringe in 2016, she went on a UK and international tour. With Triple Threat She won the Best Performer Award at the Dublin Fringe Festival in 2017.

==== Post-Popular ====
In Post-Popular, McCormick paid tribute to important women in history including Boudica and Anne Boleyn. This show consists of pop ballads, art and dancing.

==== Life: LIVE! ====
In 2019, McCormick created her first music show called Life: LIVE! in which she talked about her earlier aspirations to be a pop star. The show discusses subjects such as false dreams and misogyny.

==== Lucy and Friends ====
McCormick's last and current show is called Lucy and Friends (2021). The original show was supposed to be with five performers but because of COVID and not getting Arts Council funding, she decided to do it by herself. The show is built like a cabaret show with lots of acts but just one performer doing all of it by herself.

=== Theatre productions ===
McCormick has an acting degree from East 15 and she has been part of the cast of several theatre productions such as:

- Cowbois at the Swan Theatre
- Titus Andronicus at the Globe Theatre
- Wuthering Heights at the National Theatre
- First Love is the Revolution at Soho Theatre
- Lessons for Life at Battersea Arts Centre
- Dear Elizabeth at the Gate Theatre
- Effigies of Wickedness at Gate Theatre and the English National Opera
- Troilus and Cressida at the Globe Theatre

=== Films ===
McCormick also works as a screen actress. Films she has been involved with are Sparks, Fast and Furious: Hobbs & Shaw and Exhibition of a Film.
