= Lucy Felton =

British journalist

- Born: Lucy Victoria Wood; 25 December 1985 (age 40)
- Other name: Lucy Wood
- Education: London College of Fashion
- Years active: 2005–present
- Spouse: Christopher Felton (m. 2015)
- Children: 2
- Website: lucyfelton.com

Lucy Victoria Felton (née Wood; born 25 December 1985) is a British fashion editor, journalist, and blogger specialising in women's consumer publishing. She worked for the magazine Look from 2007 to 2016 as a senior editor and then head of fashion content. She has since been content coordinator at BBC Gardeners' World and runs the blog The Lucy Edit.

== Early life ==
Felton is from Essex. She graduated from the London College of Fashion with a Bachelor of Arts (BA) in Fashion Promotion – Journalism.

== Career ==
Under the name Lucy Wood, she began her career at Grazia magazine in 2005 as Fashion News and Features Assistant, covering the global fashion and shopping trends. In June 2007, she left her position at Grazia after two years to become Fashion News Editor at LOOK magazine. Interviewing designers, celebrities and writing fashion, style and lifestyle articles aimed at female readers led to being nominated for the PPA Association of UK Magazine and Periodical Publishers New Section Editor of the Year Award in 2008. She contributed to The Sun, The Daily Mail, Visa Europe, Drapers Record and London Metro.

From May 2008 to June 2009, she edited bi-annual and online style magazine Random, a style publication which sold out in London following the launch of its first issue. Her fashion blog Fashion Editor resulted in Asos listing her Twitter as 'one to watch' at Asos Follows Fashion along with supermodel Jessica Stam, stylist to the stars Rachel Zoe and Hilary Alexander. Felton appeared on Leon Bailey-Green's 2010/11 Online Fashion 100 list.

On screen and radio, she has appeared as a fashion expert on BBC television series Mary Queen of Shops, contributed fortnightly fashion slots for a BBC Radio Friday afternoon show, as well as various fashion segments for Asos, LOOK, Next and Miss Selfridge TV outlets.

In 2015, she was promoted to Head of Fashion Content at LOOK. With her name change to Lucy Felton, she rebranded her blog to The Lucy Edit and became a freelancer in 2016.

Felton was appointed content coordinator at BBC Gardeners' World in 2022.

== Personal life ==
She married Christopher Felton in November 2015. They have two children.
