= Lucy Ortlepp =

German painter killed in Auschwitz

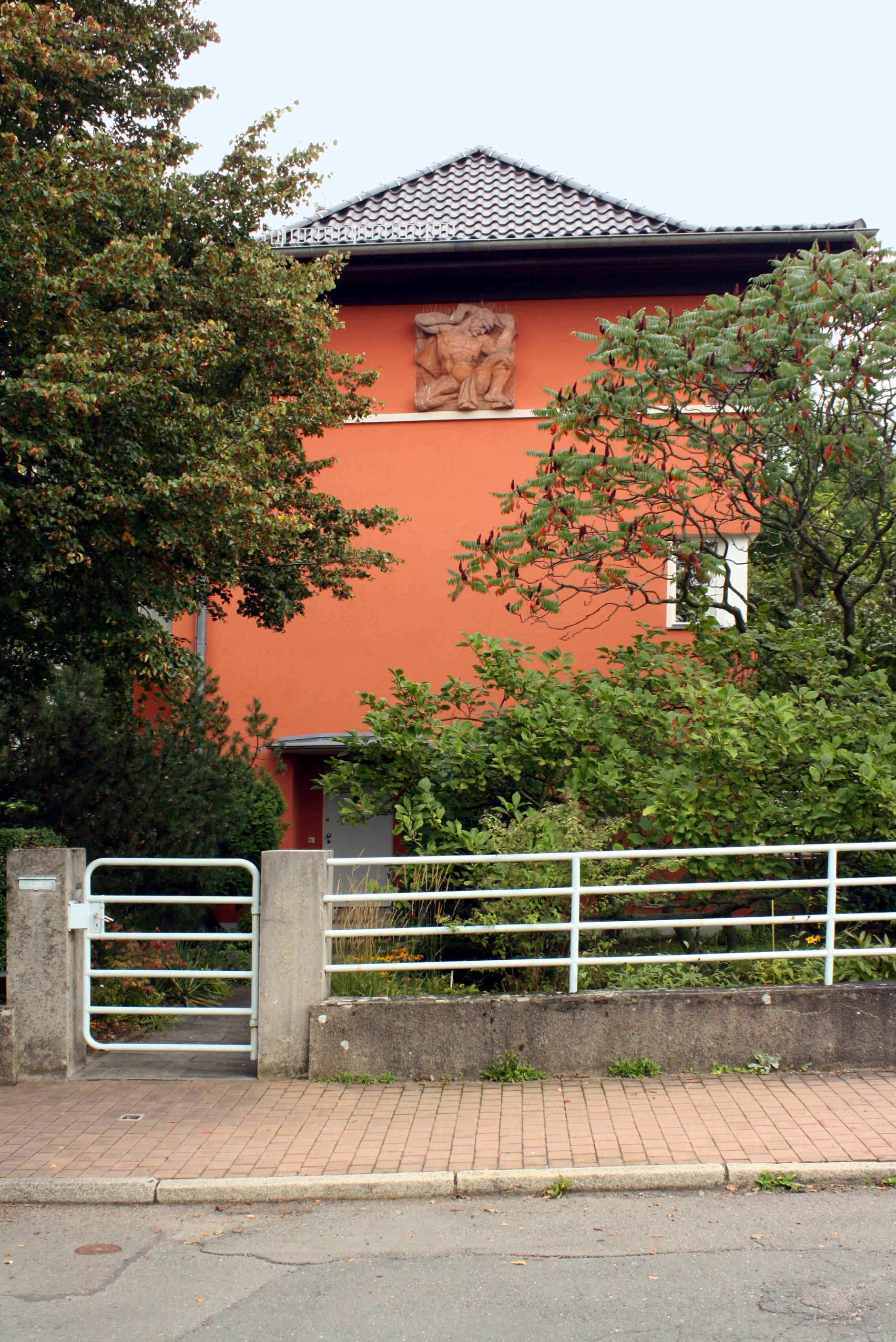
Lucy Ortlepp's home in 2014

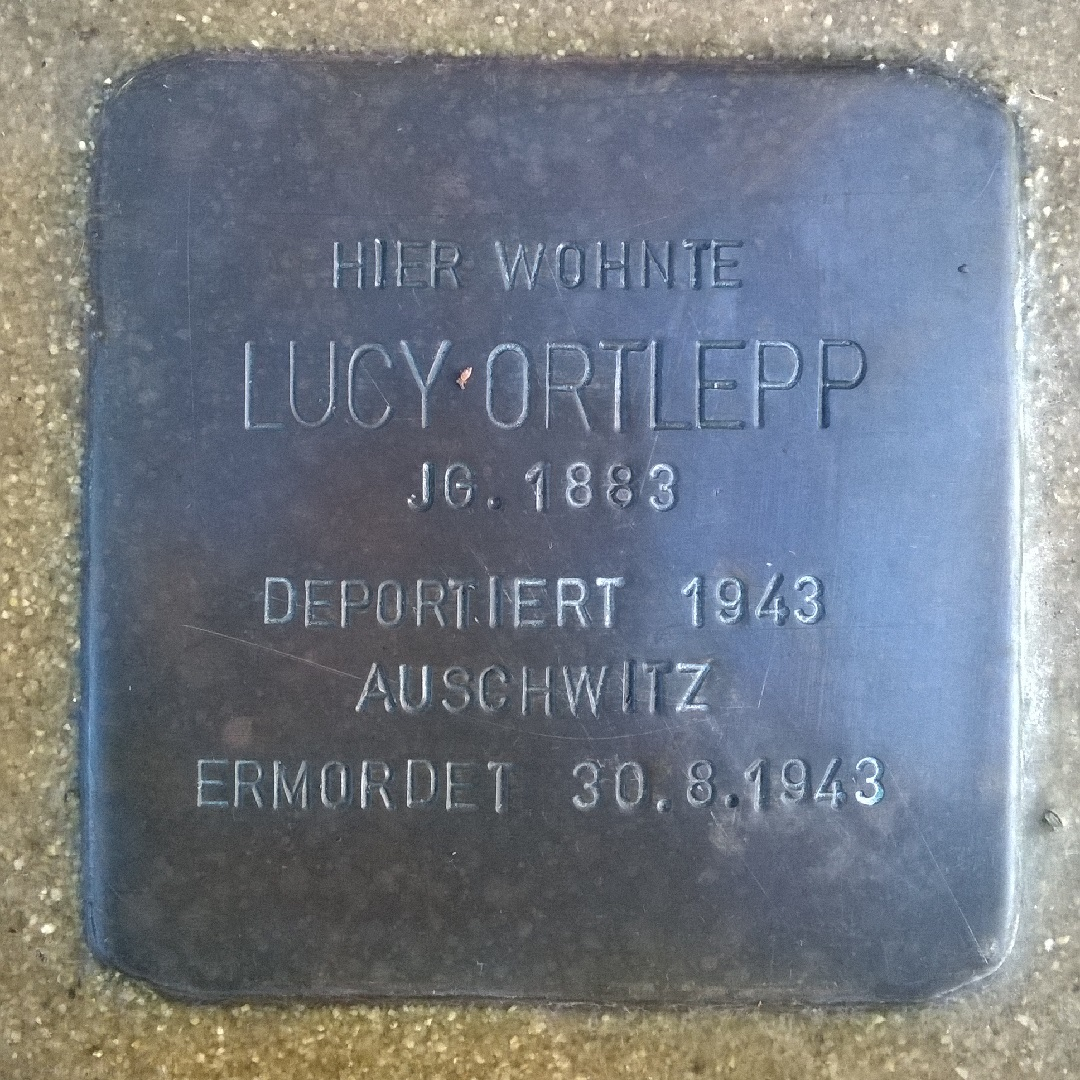
stumbling-stone dedicated to Lucy Ortlepp

Lucy Ortlepp (born Lucy Bock 2 February 1883 in Neubrandenburg, died 30 August 1943 in Auschwitz-Birkenau concentration camp) was a German painter of Jewish descent.

== Life ==
Lucy Bock was the daughter of a wealthy merchant. She did not receive regular admission to a university at the beginning of the 20th century; such admission was not usually granted to women at the time. At the age of 16, she moved to Berlin to join the Association of Berlin Women Artists, which was self-organised by women, and began studying art and painting privately. Two years later, she completed her training as a drawing teacher. She then undertook study trips to Switzerland, Italy and England. When she returned to Berlin, she continued her studies with Lovis Corinth. She was primarily interested in portraits and still lifes and used pencil, chalk, red chalk and watercolours. It was probably in Berlin that she met the budding librarian Paul Ortlepp. After he graduated in 1907, the couple married in 1908. Lucy Ortlepp gave Weimar drawing and painting lessons. When she married, she converted to Christianity and became a Protestant, but in the eyes of the National Socialists this did not compensate for her Jewish origins. The couple suffered reprisals from 1933 onwards. In 1937, Paul Ortlepp, who did not want to separate from his wife, was given early retirement. An attempt to emigrate to Switzerland in the spring of 1939 failed. He was not at home when his wife was arrested in 1943 and then deported to Auschwitz via Theresienstadt. She was murdered in the Auschwitz-Birkenau extermination camp.

Around 1927/28, the Haus Trettner was built at Ratstannenweg 21 in Weimar in the style of the Bauhaus. The now listed house was bought by the Ortlepp couple in 1930. A Stolperstein was set into the pavement in front of the house for Lucy Ortlepp.

== Bibliography ==
- Sebastian Krumbiegel and others: Stolperstein Geschichten Weimar, Eckhaus-Verlag, Weimar 2016
