= Lucy Evelyn Peabody =

American activist

Lucy Evelyn Peabody (1864 or 1865 – 19 September 1934) was an American activist. She is known as the "Mother of Mesa Verde National Park," for her role in establishing the Colorado ruins as a National Park alongside Virginia McClurg. She was also involved in state politics in Colorado and was a member of a number of archeological and political associations.

== Early life ==
Lucy Evelyn Davison was born to A.S. and Lucy A. (Fox) Davison in Cincinnati, Ohio, in 1864 or 1865. She was educated in convents in Ohio and attended school in Washington, D.C. She worked as a secretary assistant in the Bureau of Ethnology in D.C. for 9 years where she met Major William Sloane Peabody, an executive officer of the US Geological Survey, whom she married on March 4, 1895. When William retired the pair moved to Denver, Colorado.

== Mesa Verde conservation ==
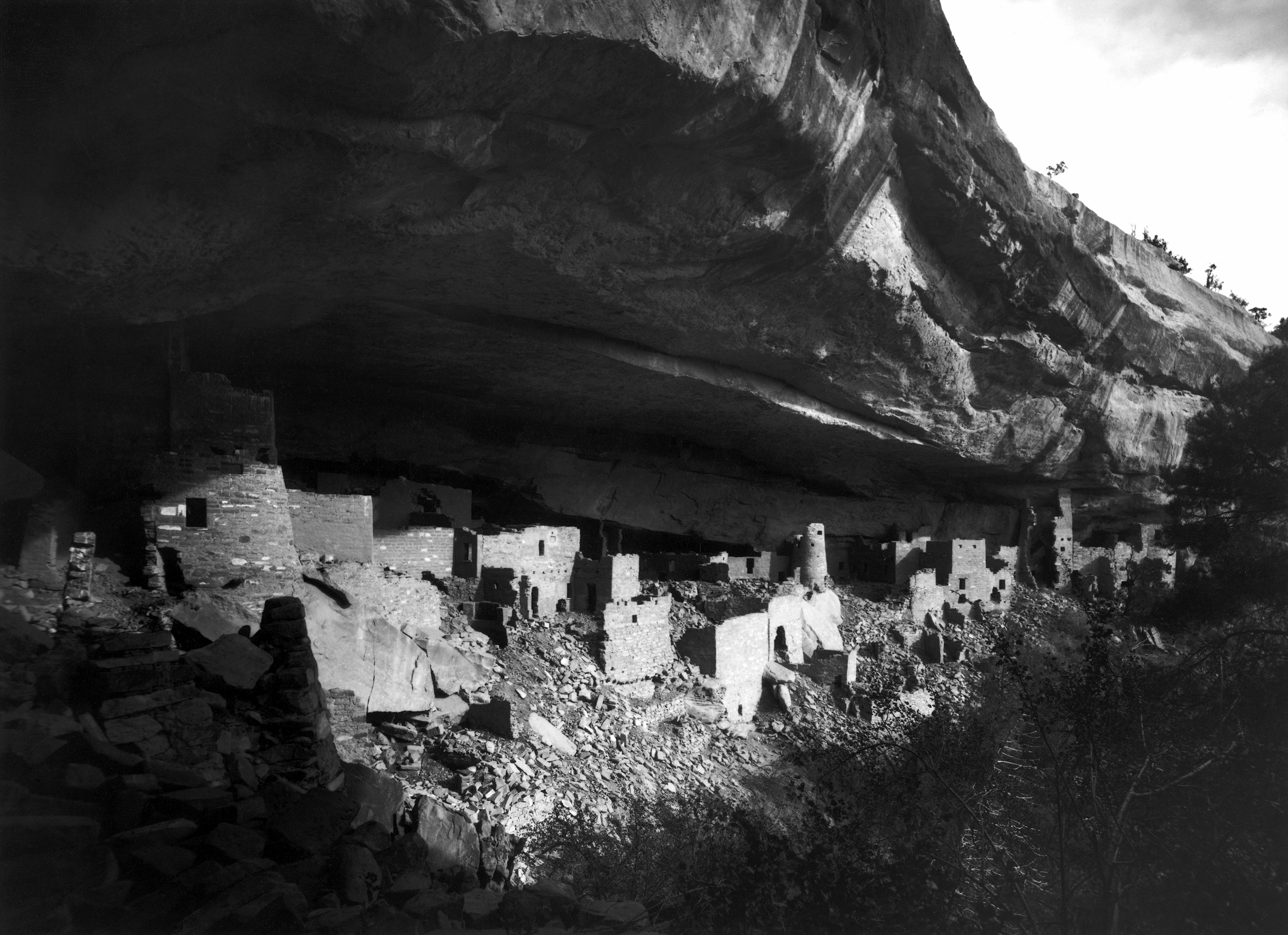
The cliff dwellings at Mesa Verde National Park in 1891

Peabody is most notable for her work to establish Mesa Verde, a notable archeological area of preserved Ancestral Puebloan cliff dwellings in Colorado, as a National Park. She worked closely with Virginia McClurg over the course of 9 years to achieve this goal, and is now known as "the mother of Mesa Verde."

After an attempt to establish Mesa Verde as a National Park failed in 1894, McClurg persuaded the Colorado State Federation of Women's Clubs to create a committee to advocate for the Colorado cliff dwellings. McClurg led the group as it expanded and branched off into the Colorado Cliff Dwellings Association, which was established in 1900 with 19 charter members. The motto of the group was Dux Femina Facti or "feminine leadership has accomplished it," and was headed by Virginia McClurg as regent and Lucy Peabody as vice-regent. The group's goal was to preserve the Mesa Verde ruins and protect them from individual archeologists or developers. In 1901, they secured an agreement with the Weeminuche Utes for exclusive water rights and permission to build and maintain roads. The women worked hard to gain support for their cause, showing the land to members of the American Association for the Advancement of Science. Peabody also published an official report regarding the restoration and preservation of Native American ruins in 1900.

The movement was gaining momentum, but McClurg changed her stance in 1904 and wanted Mesa Verde to instead be a State Park administered by the Colorado Cliff Dwellings Association. Peabody maintained her initial stance and split off from McClurg, leaving the Colorado Cliff Dwellings Association along with a number of the other members.

Peabody travelled to Washington, D.C., to continue her lobbying. Edgar Hewett of the Archaeological Institute of America, helped her to push the Herschel M. Hogg Bill regarding the park to be approved. The Hogg Bill was passed on June 7, 1906, but unfortunately contained boundaries for the park which excluded all of the major ruins. This error was quickly improved with the Brooks-Leupp Amendment on June 29, 1906, which determined that all ruins within 5 miles of the original boundary are to be treated as part of the National Park.

In 1907 Peabody was recognized by the American Anthropological Association for her work in establishing Mesa Verde. Her friend, Dr. Edgar Hewett named the Peabody House (or the Spruce Tree House) in her honor.

== Personal life ==
Peabody was a member of numerous associations and groups. This included membership in the Colorado Equal Suffrage Association, Colorado Society of the Archaeological Institute of America, National Geographic Society, Direct Legislation League, Women's Club of Denver, and the American Association for the Advancement of Science. She was one of the founders of the American Anthropological Association. She worked for the passage of child labor laws, traveling libraries, and the recognition of Lincoln's birthday as a state holiday. She was known to be a Democrat and to favor women's suffrage.

She died on September 19, 1934, in Denver, Colorado.

== See also ==
- Edgar Hewett
- Jesse Walter Fewkes
