= Lucy Whitehead McGill Waterbury Peabody =

American missionary (1861–1949)

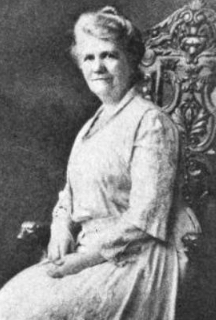

Personal life
- Born: Lucy Whitehead McGill; March 2, 1861 Belmont, Kansas
- Died: February 26, 1949 (aged 87) Danvers, Massachusetts
- Spouse: Norman W. Waterbury, Henry W. Peabody
- Notable work: Woman's Baptist Foreign Missionary Society

Religious life
- Religion: Christianity
- Denomination: Baptist

Lucy Whitehead McGill Waterbury Peabody (1861–1949) was an American Baptist missionary. She was influential in Baptist foreign missions in the late 19th and early 20th centuries.

== Biography ==
Lucy Whitehead McGill was born in Belmont, Kansas, on March 2, 1861, to Sarah and John McGill. She attended secondary school in Rochester, New York, graduating from New York's Rochester Academy in 1878 and attending classes at the University of Rochester. She was a teacher at the Rochester State School for the Deaf for three years. McGill married Norman W. Waterbury, a Baptist minister, in 1881. They moved to Madras, India and were missionaries among the Telugu people. Reverend Waterbury died in 1886. Lucy then came back to Rochester and in 1889 moved to Boston. She served as home secretary of the Woman's Baptist Foreign Missionary Society of the East in 1890. She oversaw new missionary recruitment and the production of literature. That year she founded the girls' auxiliary to the mission, the Farther Lights Society. She also worked to establish an annual day of prayer for missions, later known as the World Day of Prayer.

Lucy met Baptist social reformer Helen Barrett Montgomery in the 1890s. They collaborated on writing projects. Lucy chaired the United Study of Foreign Missions' Central Committee from 1902 to 1929. She worked to develop a textbook series for missionary summer schools and women's study groups. In 1906, she married Henry W. Peabody. He died in 1908 and left her a sizeable estate. She was the founder of the children's magazine Everyland in 1908 and served as editor until 1920.

Peabody was an important member and primary instigator of the Committee on Christian Literature for Women and Children in 1912. Part of the Interdenominational Conference of Woman's Boards of Foreign Missions in the United States and Canada, the committee distributed magazines around the world. In 1913, she was elected vice president of the Woman's American Baptist Foreign Mission Society's (WABFMS) foreign department. Peabody and Helen Barrett Montgomery were delegates to the Edinburgh Continuation Committee in The Hague in 1913. From 1913 to 1914, Montgomery and Peabody toured and inspected missions throughout the world. In 1916, she played a key role in transforming the Interdenominational Conference into the Federation of Women's Boards of Foreign Missions. Peabody chaired a commission that studied mission schools and again toured missions around the world from 1919 to 1920. Peabody raised funds to establish seven Asian women's colleges from 1920 to 1923. She later served on the boards of three of the schools: the Shanghai Medical College; the Christian Medical College & Hospital in Vellore, India; and the Women's Christian College in Madras.

After World War I, Peabody's views correlated with that of the Northern Baptist Convention fundamentalists' moderate wing. Peabody supported ecumenism and resigned from her role as vice president of WABFMS in 1921. With Marguerite Doane, she promoted the Houses of Fellowship in Ventnor, New Jersey. She opposed the repeal of Prohibition and was president of the Women's National Committee for Law Enforcement for over 10 years. In the 1920s, a disagreement over personnel involving her son-in-law Raphael C. Thomas and the American Baptist Foreign Mission Society led her to found an independent mission agency. In 1927, she walked out of the American Baptists' annual convention due to their management policies. After resigning from her other denominational offices, she founded the Association of Baptists for Evangelism in the Orient (later the Association of Baptists for World Evangelism). The group established missions in the Philippines. From 1928, Peabody published their magazine Message and also served as the organization's president until 1934. Her presidency ended due to opposition to women in leadership and disparate theological views.

Peabody died on February 26, 1949, in Danvers, Massachusetts.
