= Lucy Jane Wood =

Blogger, Internet personality, and author

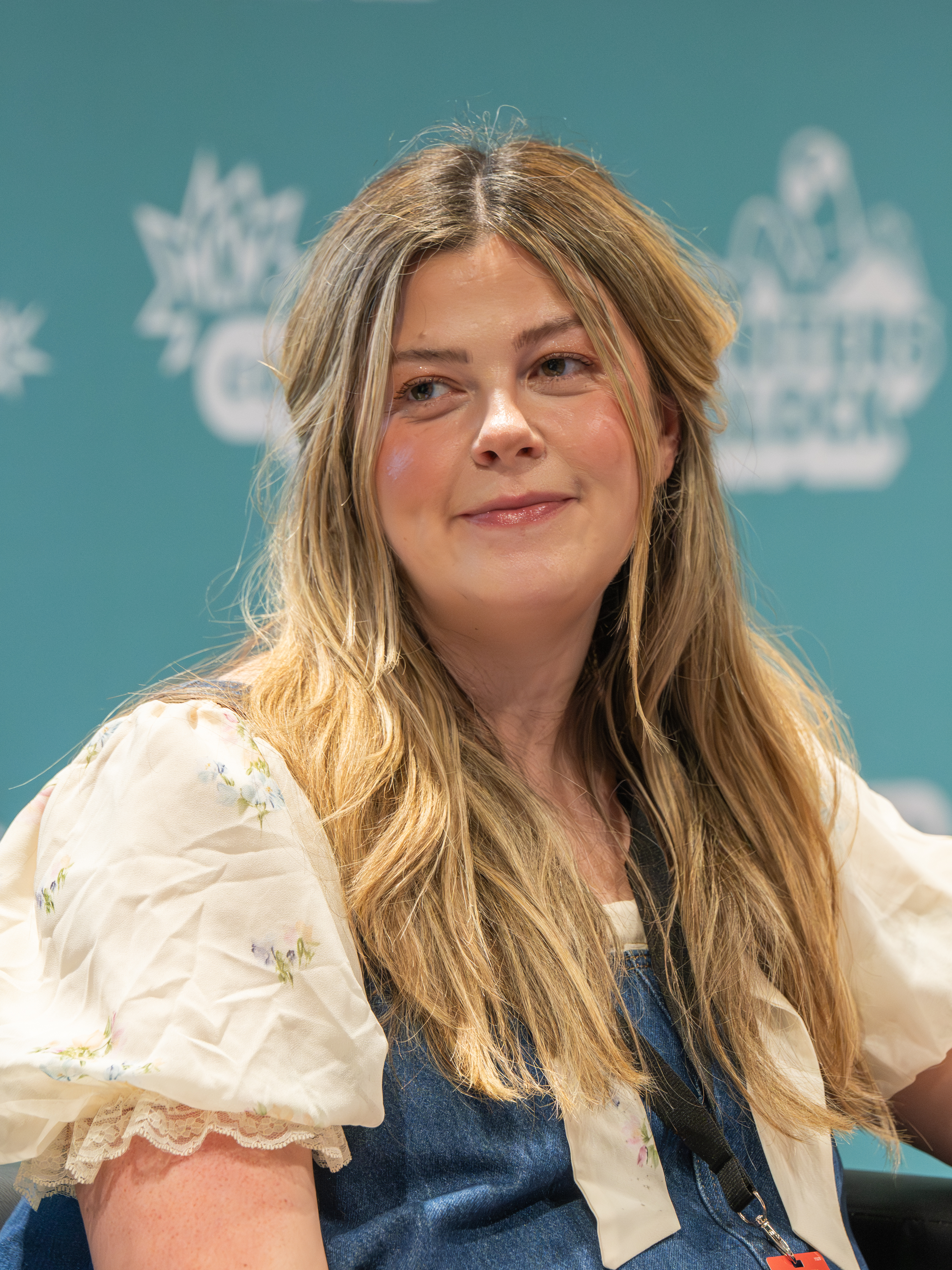
- At MCM London Comic Con, 22 May 2026
- Born: Birkenhead, England
- Other name: Lucy Wood
- Education: Queen Mary University of London

YouTube information
- Channel: Lucy Wood
- Years active: 2010–present
- Website: www.lucyjanewood.co.uk

Lucy Jane Wood is an English writer and YouTuber. She began her career making fashion-related videos and contributing pop culture articles to Cosmopolitan UK, Sugarscape, and Metro. She authored the fantasy novels Rewitched (2024) and Uncharmed (2025).

== Early life and education ==
Wood is from the Wirral and attended Wirral Grammar School for Girls. She graduated from Queen Mary University of London in 2013.

== Career ==
Shortly after graduating university, Wood started her YouTube channel in summer 2013. She became known for her fashion, beauty, and lifestyle content, particularly her Size 14 clothing haul series. She was a panelist at Summer in the City (SitC). As of 2024, Wood's channel had over 200 thousand subscribers.

In addition, Wood became a regular contributor to Cosmopolitan UK and worked as a multimedia editor at Sugarscape. After leaving the latter to freelance in 2017, she began contributing to Metro. In 2018 and 2019, her celebrity articles also appeared in Cosmopolitan's sister magazines such as Harper's Bazaar and Marie Claire, and she had a stint at the latter as a morning editor.

In February 2024, Wood signed a two-book deal with Pan Macmillan, through which she published her debut fantasy novel Rewitched that September. The novel follows a 30-year-old witch named Belle who lives in London. Wood had taken inspiration from 1990s witch-related media. To promote Rewitched, Pan Macmillan experimented with the publisher's first influencer-led marketing campaign. with Wood featured at the Edinburgh Women's Fiction Festival.

== Selected works ==
- Rewitched (2024)
- Uncharmed (2025)
- Disenchanted (2026)
