= Gasoline Alley =

Gasoline Alley may refer to:

== Arts, entertainment, and media ==
- Gasoline Alley (comic strip), a comic strip by Frank King, first published in 1918
  - Gasoline Alley (radio series), a 1931–49 radio series based on the eponymous comic strip
  - Gasoline Alley (1951 film), an American comedy film
  - Corky of Gasoline Alley, its sequel released the same year
- Gasoline Alley (album), a 1970 album by Rod Stewart, or the title track song
- Gasoline Alley (2022 film), an American action thriller film

== Places ==
=== Canada ===
- Gasoline Alley, Alberta, a business park in Red Deer County, Alberta, Canada
- Gasoline Alley, Alberta (hamlet), a hamlet in Red Deer County, Alberta, Canada
- Gasoline Alley Museum, an antique car and memorabilia museum located within Heritage Park Historical Village in Calgary, Alberta

=== United States ===
- Gasoline Alley (Indianapolis Motor Speedway), the garage area at the Indianapolis Motor Speedway

== See also ==
- The Talk of Gasoline Alley, a radio program about the Indianapolis 500 instituted by Donald Davidson
- Gasoline (disambiguation)
- Alley (disambiguation)
