= LGBTQ culture in Boston =

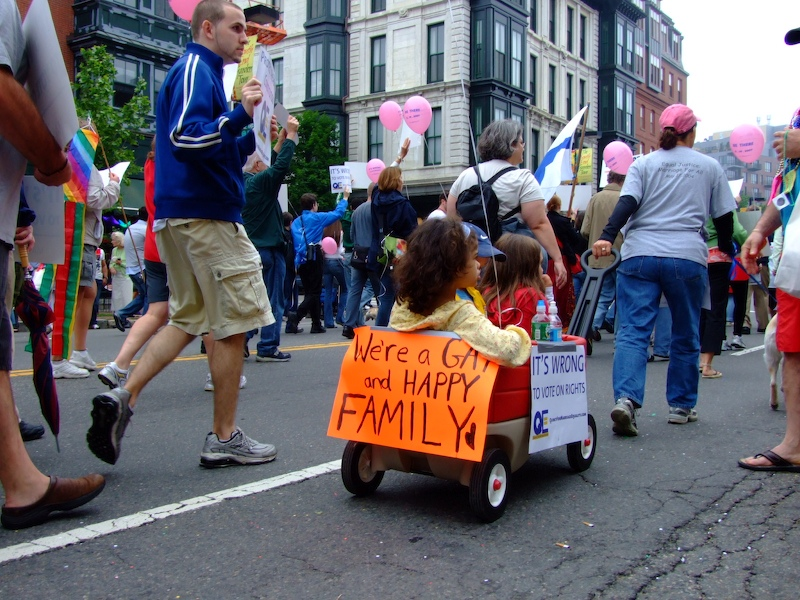
Boston gay pride march, held annually in June

Boston is a hub of LGBT culture and LGBT activism in the United States, with a rich history dating back to the election of the nation's first openly gay state representative, Elaine Noble, in 1974. The city is home to notable organizations like GLAD and Fenway Health, and it played a pivotal role in the legalization of same-sex marriage in Massachusetts. Various neighborhoods, including the South End, are known for their sizable LGBT populations, while numerous LGBT bars and entertainment venues offer spaces for community gatherings. Boston hosts an annual Pride Parade, and despite challenges, it continues to be a prominent event. Noteworthy organizations like The Welcoming Committee and the Boston Gay Men's Chorus contribute to the city's vibrant LGBT community, while The History Project preserves its rich history through an extensive LGBTQ archive.

== History ==
The nation's first openly gay state representative, Elaine Noble, was elected to the Massachusetts House of Representatives in 1974. Boston is the birthplace to the Gay & Lesbian Advocates & Defenders (GLAD). Barney Frank, who formerly represented the 4th Massachusetts Congressional District in Greater Boston, is considered one of the most prominent gay politicians in U.S. history. Due in part to actions in Boston, especially by city government officials, Massachusetts was the first state to legalize same-sex marriage.

== "Gayborhoods" ==
In Boston proper, there are several neighborhoods with sizable LGBT populations, with the South End being one of the most notable. Other areas with high LGBT populations include Jones Hill, the Savin Hill and Melville Park areas of Dorchester, and Jamaica Plain.

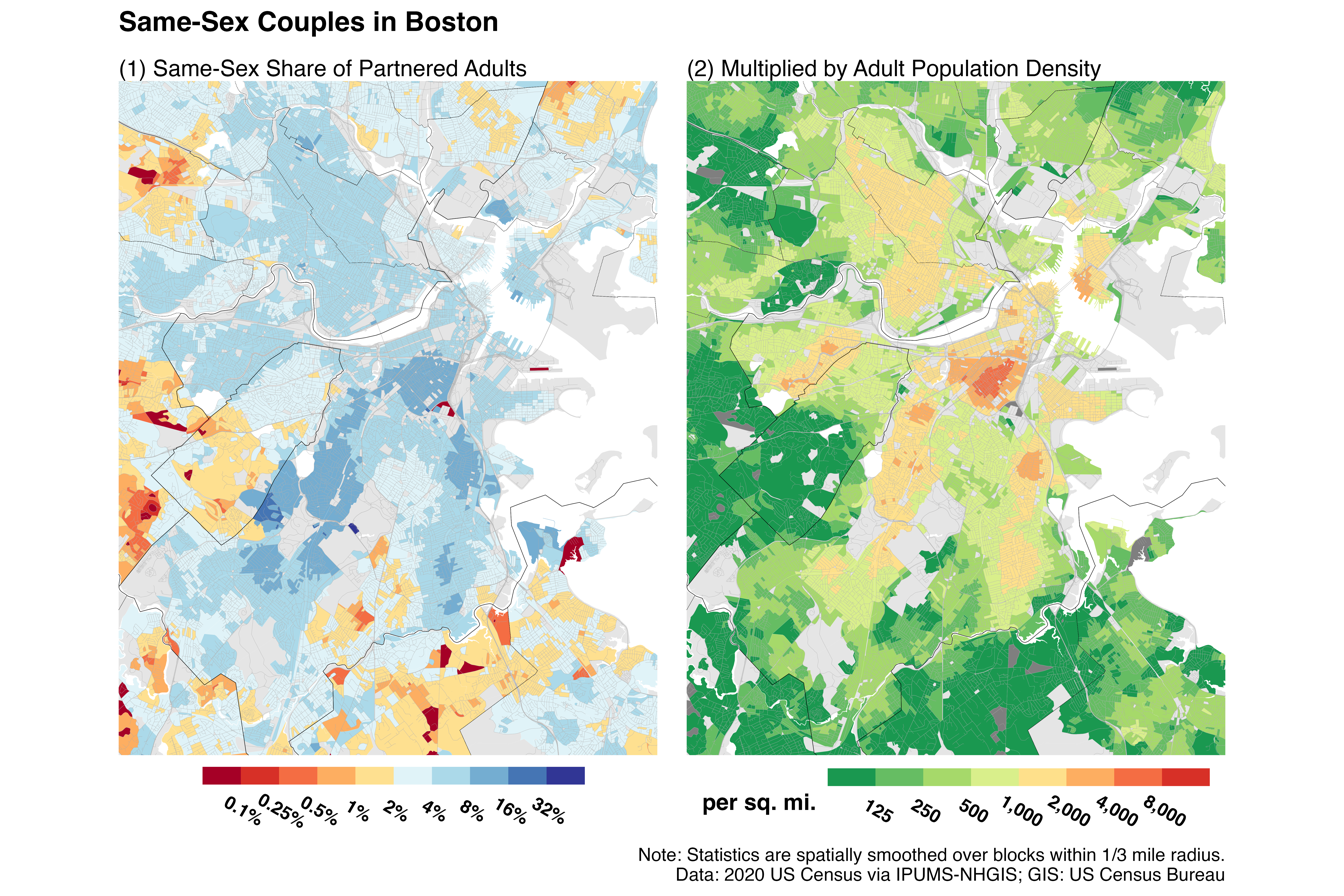
Map of same-sex couples in Boston

== Bars and entertainment ==
Boston has numerous permanent LGBT establishments including Club Café, The Alley Bar, Cathedral Station, Jacques' Cabaret, dbar, Blend (formerly Peggy O'Neil's) and Trophy Room (formerly the Fritz). Boston also plays host to several scheduled and rotating event calendars. These include "gay nights" at regularly "straight establishments" hosted by promoters such as Gay Mafia Boston (formerly known as Chris Harris Presents), Jim Murray Events and The Welcoming Committee. Dani's Queer Bar, which describes itself as a "space for Sapphic, trans and non-binary community members," opened September 2024.

The city's annual Pride Parade was large and well attended with an estimated 25,000 marchers in 2014. In addition to the parade, the Boston Pride Committee scheduled a full week of events to celebrate the community's diversity and social progress. Boston Pride, the organization that organized the Pride Parade each year, disbanded in 2021 amid allegations of racism and transphobia. Boston's Pride Parade resumed in 2023, organized by Boston Pride For The People, and was celebrated by around one million people who watched 10,000-plus parade participants celebrate Pride

=== Former bars ===
- Boston Eagle closed March 2021

== Noteworthy LGBT organizations ==
=== Fenway Health ===
Founded as the "Fenway Community Health Center" in 1971, Fenway Health has evolved to become a national contributor in the research of health issues particularly concerning the LGBT community. Fenway Health's mission is to "enhance the wellbeing of the lesbian, gay, bisexual and transgender community and all people in our neighborhoods and beyond through access to the highest quality health care, education, research and advocacy."

The Fenway Institute is a research organization dedicated to "research, training, education, and policy development, focusing on national and international health issues." They focus largely on supporting those with AIDS/HIV health problems.

=== The Welcoming Committee ===
The Welcoming Committee is a social outreach organization founded in Boston in 2007 that promotes "takeover" events, where the organization advertises "typically straight" events and establishments for the LGBT community to attend. The most frequently occurring events are their monthly Guerrilla Queer Bar (GQB) and Flannel Takeover Company (FTC). They also have takeover trips to casino resorts, ski mountains, and cruises. The Welcoming Committee is expanding to other cities as well, which already include Philadelphia and Washington D.C.

=== Boston Gay Men's Chorus ===
The Boston Gay Men's Chorus is a group of vocalists located in Boston, Massachusetts. The group currently has over 200 members and has been directed by Conductor Reuben Reynolds for over 20 years. The group is heard by over 10,000 audience members per season and has performed across the globe. The chorus performs songs from a wide variety of genres and song selections are always "hopeful and optimistic." The chorus has had over 1,600 members during its history and has performed at Carnegie Hall, Symphony Hall, and Jordan Hall.

=== The History Project ===
Founded in 1980, The History Project is a Boston-based, volunteer-run community LGBTQ archive. Its archives house over 150 collections from organizations and individuals and more than one million items, making it one of the largest independent LGBTQ archives in the United States. In 1996, The History Project opened an exhibition of pre-Stonewall LGBTQ history at the Boston Public Library, entitled Public Faces/Private Lives. The History Project continues to regularly host events for the public, including its online exhibitions and Out of the Archives presentation series.
