= Alley (disambiguation) =

An alley is a narrow lane, path, or passageway.

Alley or The Alley may also refer to:

- Alley (surname)
- The Alley (Oakland, California), a restaurant and piano bar in Oakland, California
- The Alley Bar, a gay bar in Boston, Massachusetts
- The Alley (Taiwan), a chain of bubble tea shop
- Bowling alley, a building where the game of bowling is played
- The Alleys, 2021 Jordanian film

Alleyway may also refer to:

- In typography, alley or gutter refers to the gap between two columns of text
- Alleyway (video game), a 1989 game for the Game Boy.
- An alley is a technical term in track and field to describe a technique in staging the start of a track race with multiple athletes sharing multiple lanes
