= 50 Lan =

Taiwanese bubble tea chain

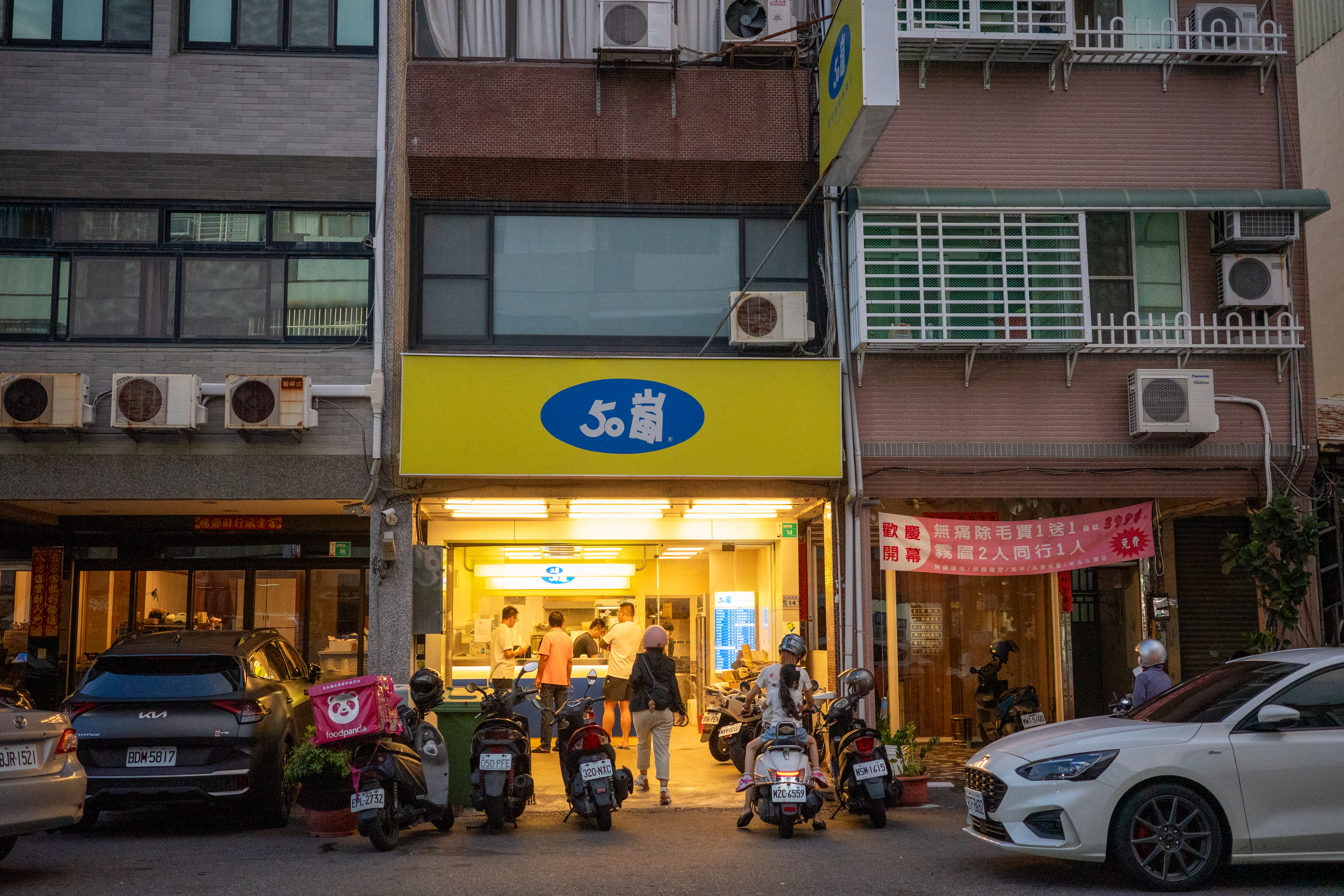
- 50 Lan branch at Tainan's Dexing Road
- Native name: 50嵐
- Type: Private
- Industry: Drink
- Founded: 1994 in Tainan, Taiwan
- Founder: Ma Shao-wei
- Headquarters: Tainan, Taiwan
- Number of locations: 612 (2024)
- Area served: Taiwan
- Key people: Ma Shao-wei (manages Tainan); Ma Ya-fang (manages Taoyuan–Hsinchu–Miaoli); Ma Ya-fen (manages Taichung); Guo Zong-feng (manages Kaohsiung and Pintung); Lou Gengshen (manages Taipei)
- Products: Bubble tea
- Brands: KOI Thé; 1 Diandian; Wushiland Boba

Chinese name
- Traditional Chinese: 50嵐
- Simplified Chinese: 50岚
Transcriptions
Standard Mandarin
- Hanyu Pinyin: Wǔshí Lán
Yue: Cantonese
- Jyutping: Ng^{5} Sap^{6} Laam^{4}
- Website: www.50嵐綠茶.tw

50 Lan (traditional Chinese: 50嵐; simplified Chinese: 50岚) is a Taiwanese bubble tea chain. In 1994, Ma Shao-wei, the founder, and his sister Ma Ya-fang, started a juice and tea street stall next to their mother's fried chicken stall in Tainan, a city in southern Taiwan. They switched to focusing on selling only tea and as business improved, upgraded from a street stall to a terrace. The first 50 Lan store opened in 1997 and a second opened the next year. Over ten branches opened in Tainan after friends and relatives wanted to become franchisees.

The company's headquarters is in Tainan and there are four regional divisions that function separately. Guo Zong-feng, Ma's army friend, started a company in 2000 to manage branches in Kaohsiung and Pingtung. Ma Ya-fen, Ma's sister, formed a management company in 2002 to oversee branches in Central District, Changhua, Chiayi County, and Yunlin County. In 2003, Ma's university classmate began managing branches in the Taipei–Keelung metropolitan area, while Ma's sister Ma Ya-fang started overseeing branches in the Taoyuan–Hsinchu area. There were 612 50 Lan stores in Taiwan by 2024.

To expand the chain outside of Taiwan, Ma Ya-fen in 2006 created the sister brand KOI Thé which operates in a number of Southeast Asia countries and Fiftylan, which operates in the United States. Guo Zong-feng separately expanded the chain to the United States through Wushiland Boba in 2016. To expand to mainland China, Lou Gengshen, who managed 50 Lan's Taipei branches, founded 1 Diandian (Chinese: 1點點) in 2010.

== History ==
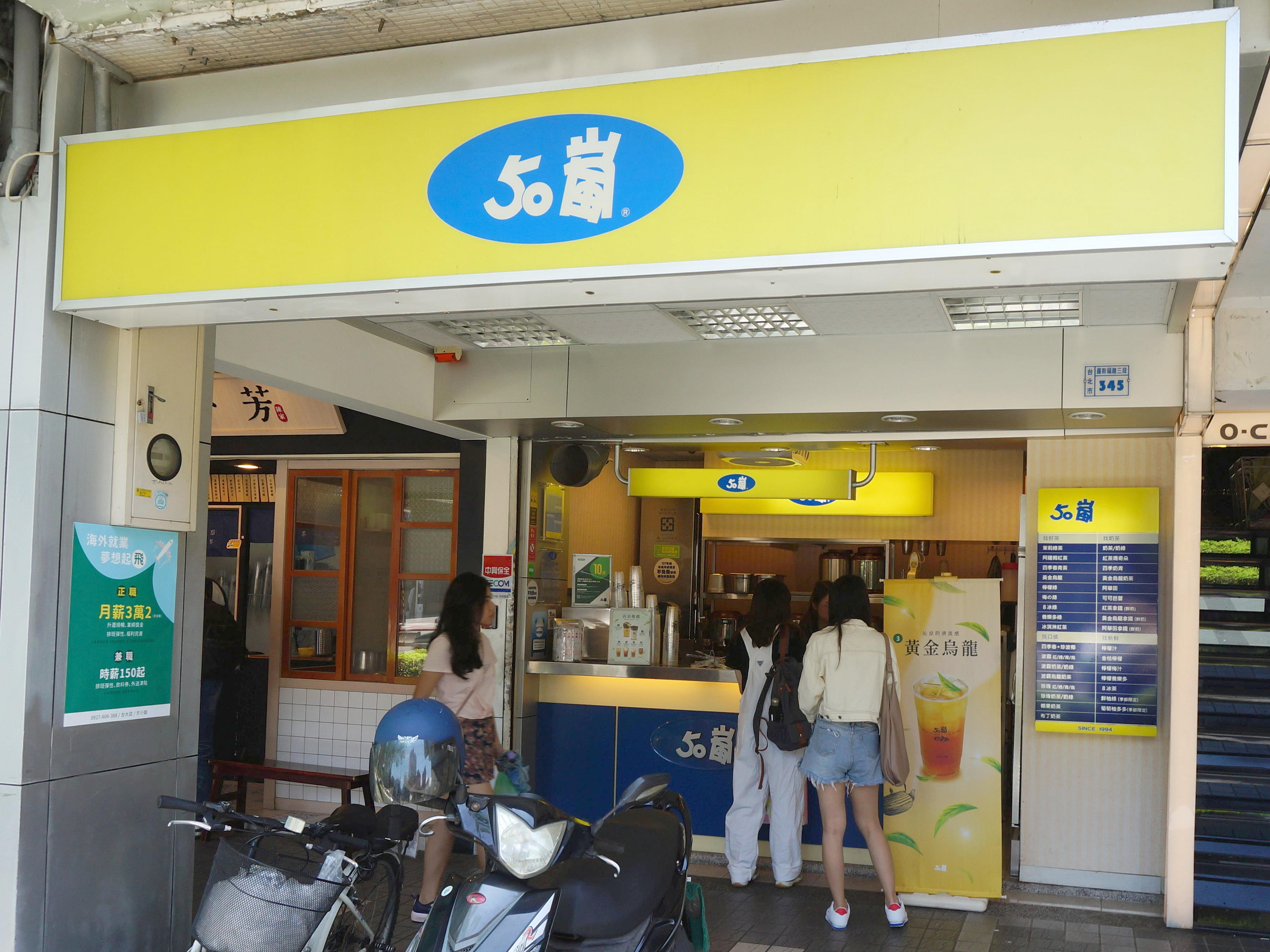
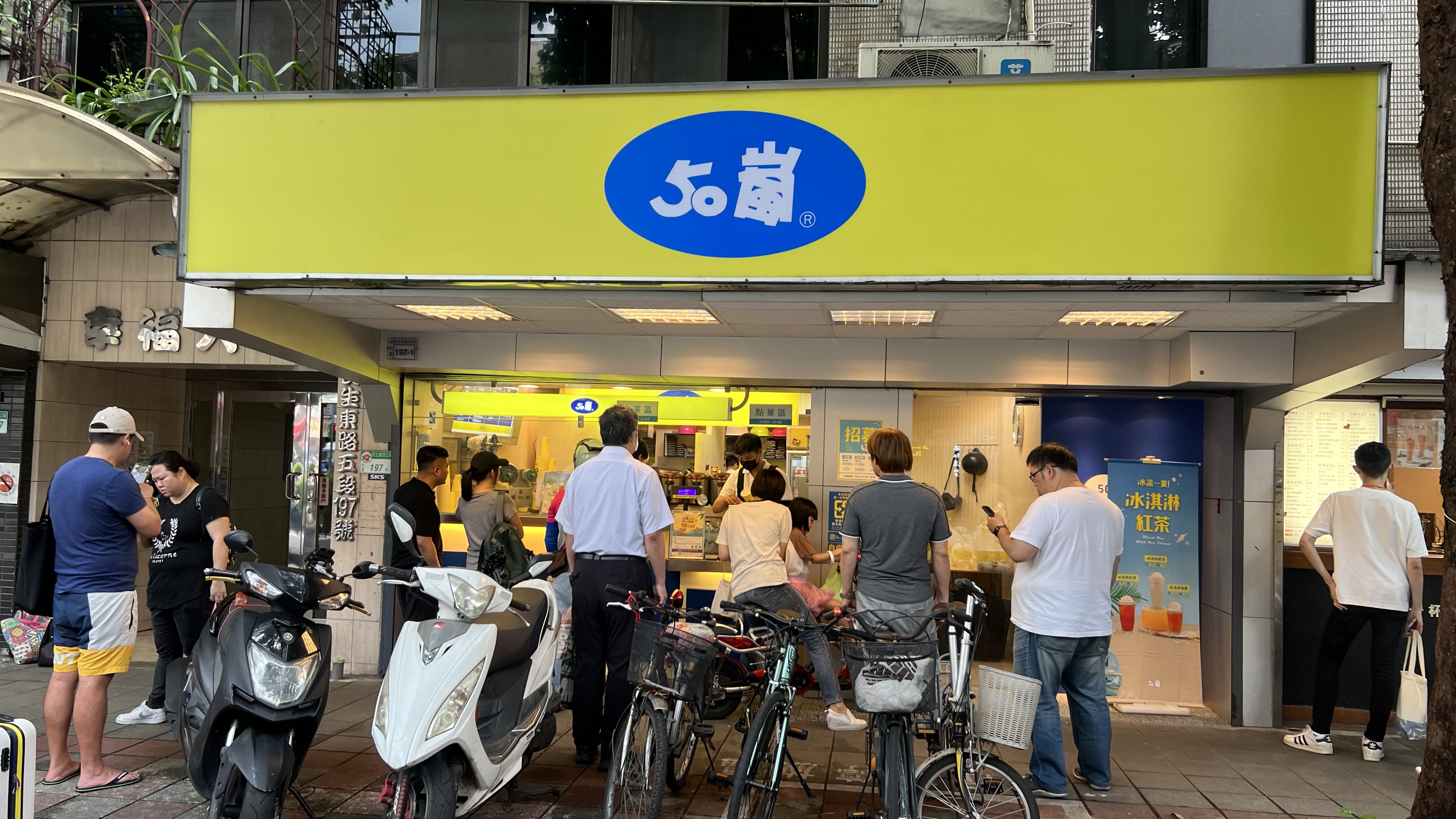
50 Lan branches in Taipei on Roosevelt Road and in the Songshan District, respectively

50 Lan's founder, Ma Shao-wei (Chinese: 馬紹維), (Note: Ma Rui-dong (Chinese: 馬瑞東) founded 50 Lan. After establishing the company, he changed his name to Ma Shao-wei (Chinese: 馬紹維).) had attended the aerospace engineering department at Tamkang University. Upon finishing his military service, he moved back to Tainan, where he had grown up. Ma initially worked with his father in the recycled gold business but found that profits were slim. In 1993, his mother opened a fried chicken stall outside her home at Tainan's Dexing Road (Chinese: 德興路) through which she made a monthly net profit of between NT$100,000 (US$3,580) and NT$200,000 (US$7,160). Investing NT$10,000 (US$358), Ma Shao-wei and his sister, Ma Ya-fang (Chinese: 馬雅芳), (Note: Ma Ya-fang (Chinese: 馬雅芳) is Ma Shao-wei's youngest sister. A source calls her his "fourth younger sister" (Chinese: 四妹).) launched a juice and tea stall alongside their mother's fried chicken stall in 1994. Ma Shao-wei opted to focus on the tea market after realizing the labor-intensive nature of beverage preparation and facing challenges in sourcing fresh fruit and additional raw ingredients.

Ma Shao-wei's family suggested that he choose a name for the tea stall. He was browsing a Japanese magazine and found the name "50 Lan" (Chinese: 五十嵐) memorable. Thinking that "even Grandma can remember it", Ma selected 50 Lan as the name six months after it had opened. As business improved, they upgraded from a street stall to a terrace. Ma and his sister launched the inaugural 50 Lan store in 1997 on Tainan's Xinxiao Road (Chinese: 新孝路). They started the second location in 1998. Friends and relatives expressed interest in franchising, leading to the launch of over ten 50 Lan outlets in Tainan.

Guo Zong-feng (Chinese: 郭宗峰), who had served with Ma in the army, purchased the right to operate 50 Lan in the Gaoping region in 2000, which introduced the Tainan-based beverage store to additional cities and counties. Ma's Tainan locations of 50 Lan were often situated in alleys. On the other hand, Guo and his wife placed their Kaohsiung 50 Lan stores along roads that did not have traffic islands. This swiftly increased brand recognition since vehicles moved at slow speeds along these roads and there was convenient parking. The Business Today journalist Wan Bei-lin said that it was under Guo Zong-feng's efforts that 50 Lan gained recognition.

Ma Ya-fen (Chinese: 馬雅芬), Ma Shao-wei's sister, later became a leader at 50 Lan. (Note: Ma Ya-fen (Chinese: 馬雅芬) is Ma Shao-wei's younger sister. A source calls her his "second younger sister" (Chinese: 二妹). She also goes by Avon Ma and Khloe Ma.: For Avon Ma; For Khloe Ma; For her Chinese name; For her being a leader at 50 Lan) After graduating from the French department of Tamkang University, she began her career at The Westin Taipei before becoming a front desk attendant and cashier at a Taichung hotel affiliated with EVA Air. Observing 50 Lan's fast growth in Kaohsiung, Ma suggested to her brother that 50 Lan be brought to Taichung. To prepare for leading this expansion, she moved back to the company's headquarters in Tainan for six months of training. Ma became proficient in brewing tea by working as a front-line worker between 7 am and 10 pm. She reviewed Ray Kroc's book about McDonald's development and assembled her brother's standard operating procedures into a small book. As she acquired the skills to operate an outlet by herself, she set the drinks' ice and sweetness ratios.

Ma Ya-fen began recruiting the initial 10 franchisees for 50 Lan's Taichung branches in 2002. Aiming to train the employees from the ground up, she mimicked EVA Air's recruitment approach of choosing college graduates below the age of 30 who were beginning their careers. The candidates were required to spend three days in the kitchen prior to securing a site. Applicants who were overly adamant on their selected site would be turned down. The first Taichung branch struggled in its first month with customers complaining about the cost. Since her brother had required the use of higher-quality ingredients such as creamer and tea leaves, 50 Lan's drinks cost NT$5 (US$0.18) more than competitors' drinks. Revenue grew in the second and third months as customers returned and spread word about the business. As staff members at the franchised outlets sought to launch their 50 Lan shops, Ma required them to obtain the franchisee's backing. She grew 50 Lan's footprint to the urban regions in Taiwan's northern and central parts.

50 Lan had 28 stores by 2004 in Taiwan's central part which discontinued taking on additional franchise partners. It instead launched company-owned outlets and permitted existing franchisees to open additional locations. Rather than receiving dues from the franchisees, the central office bills franchisees for the raw materials they buy. Only employees were allowed to become franchise owners. They had to work for the company for at least two years as well as pass an evaluation. Mao Shao-wei gave a university classmate the right to manage 50 Lan branches in Taipei in 2003. Ma Ya-fang, the younger sister who had established the fruit stall with him, secured the right to manage stores in the Taoyuan–Hsinchu area in 2005.

During the 2019–2020 Hong Kong protests, numerous Taiwanese shoppers refused to patronize bubble tea stores that backed China's one country, two systems strategy for Hong Kong which China wishes eventually to implement in Taiwan. When some bubble tea franchise owners supported the protests, Chinese netizens urged Chinese consumers to avoid those businesses. 50 Lan stated the company was founded in Taiwan, China.

In 2011, 50 Lan was Taiwan's second-biggest tea brand behind Ching-Shin Fu-Chuan, which serves "pure" tea and had 1,000 branches. The data firm LnData in 2023 recorded that in Taiwan there were 61 bubble tea brands. During that year's initial three quarters, 50 Lan purchases made up 24.3% of the bubble tea sales. According to LnData, 50 Lan occupied the number one spot in Taiwan's bubble tea market and over that year was the most sought-after choice among every age demographic. By 2024, there were 612 50 Lan stores in Taiwan. Significant competitors of 50 Lan are Chatime and Ching-Shin Fu-Chuan. Other chains competing in the Taiwanese bubble tea market are The Alley, CoCo Fresh Tea & Juice, Gong Cha, and Yifang Taiwan Fruit Tea.

== Ownership structure ==
Functioning separately, 50 Lan's regional divisions are under the authority of the central office in Tainan. The company has headquarters in five regions: Kaohsiung, Taichung, Tainan, Taipei, and Taoyuan–Hsinchu. Founder Ma Shao-wei manages branches in the Tainan region, while his sisters and friends manage branches elsewhere. His military friend, Guo Zong-feng, established Xinlan Company (Chinese: 新嵐公司) in 2000, managing the Kaohsiung and Pingtung regions. His sister Ma Ya-fen's Yalan Company (Chinese: 雅嵐公司), which was established in 2002, manages branches in Central District, Changhua, Chiayi County, and Yunlin County. The branches in those regions merged in 2016 to form the 50 Lan Central Regional Agency (Chinese: 50嵐中區代理). Founded in 2003, his university classmate's Shengen Tea (Chinese: 深耕茶葉) manages branches in the Taipei–Keelung metropolitan area. Established in 2005, his sister Ma Ya-fang's Chunlan Company (Chinese: 春嵐公司) manages branches in the Taoyuan–Hsinchu–Miaoli area.

== Overseas brands ==
=== KOI Thé ===
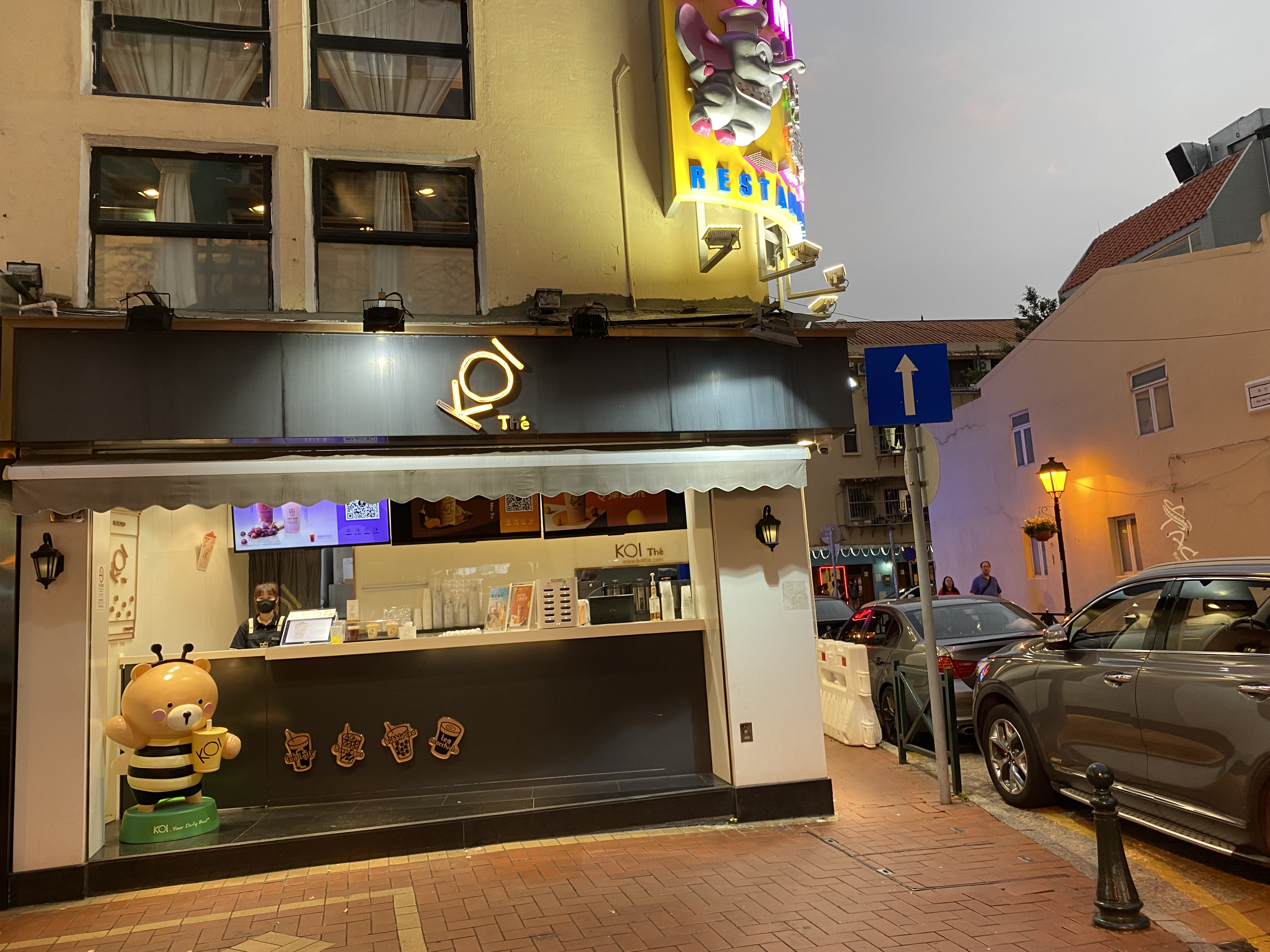
KOI Thé branch in Macau

As her brother continued to be focused on the company's Taiwanese operations, Ma Ya-fen sought to expand 50 Lan to mainland China and other international markets. But the 50 Lan brand has been heavily counterfeited. She could not use the 50 Lan name because Shanghai Zhenwu Coffee Company (Chinese: 上海真鍋咖啡公司), a mainland Chinese company, had registered the name in 2006 to sell milk tea. In 2006, Ma instead started KOI Cafe—later renamed to KOI Thé—a new brand that would be used for growing the business outside of Taiwan. The name KOI has two inspirations. The first is that when observed vertically, "KOI" looks like the Chinese character "bean" (Chinese: 豆). which evokes coffee beans. The second is that Ma's nickname is Lian (Chinese: 戀) which has a similar sound to KOI.

Owing to Singapore's reputation as a safe city and its shared cultural traits with Taiwan, Ma selected the country to be KOI's inaugural location. In November 2007, she opened the inaugural shop at Toa Payoh, a location not frequented by tourists, and at first had sluggish sales. In its initial year, the company did not break even. At the beginning, she physically moved 25 km (16 mi) sugar sacks between outlets since hiring drivers in Singapore came with a steep price tag. She brought on drivers when the number of locations exceeded her capacity. By 2011, KOI had eight branches in Singapore.

Once KOI had a solid foothold in Singapore, Ma researched expanding the brand to additional countries. She observed that numerous youth in Southeast Asia would forego a meal so that they could have bubble tea, which they regarded as a treat. KOI opened new locations in China, Cambodia, Hong Kong, Indonesia, Japan, Macau, Malaysia, Myanmar, Thailand, and Vietnam. KOI branches were opened in Dubai and New York. Its American locations were renamed to Fiftylan in 2021 to match the Taiwanese brand's name. By 2023, the brand had collaborated with TAD Group to open an outlet on Sat Masjid Road in Dhanmondi, a neighborhood in Dhaka, Bangladesh.

By 2018, KOI Thé's 213 branches in 12 countries made a yearly revenue of NT$4.5 billion (US$161,105,542) By 2024, there were 586 KOI outlets. The KOI outlets targeted high-end settings and had pricing on par with Starbucks. Showcasing elegant design, numerous outlets had spaces for customers to sit. In general, previous 50 Lan employees oversee the KOI outlets in each country.

=== 1 Diandian ===
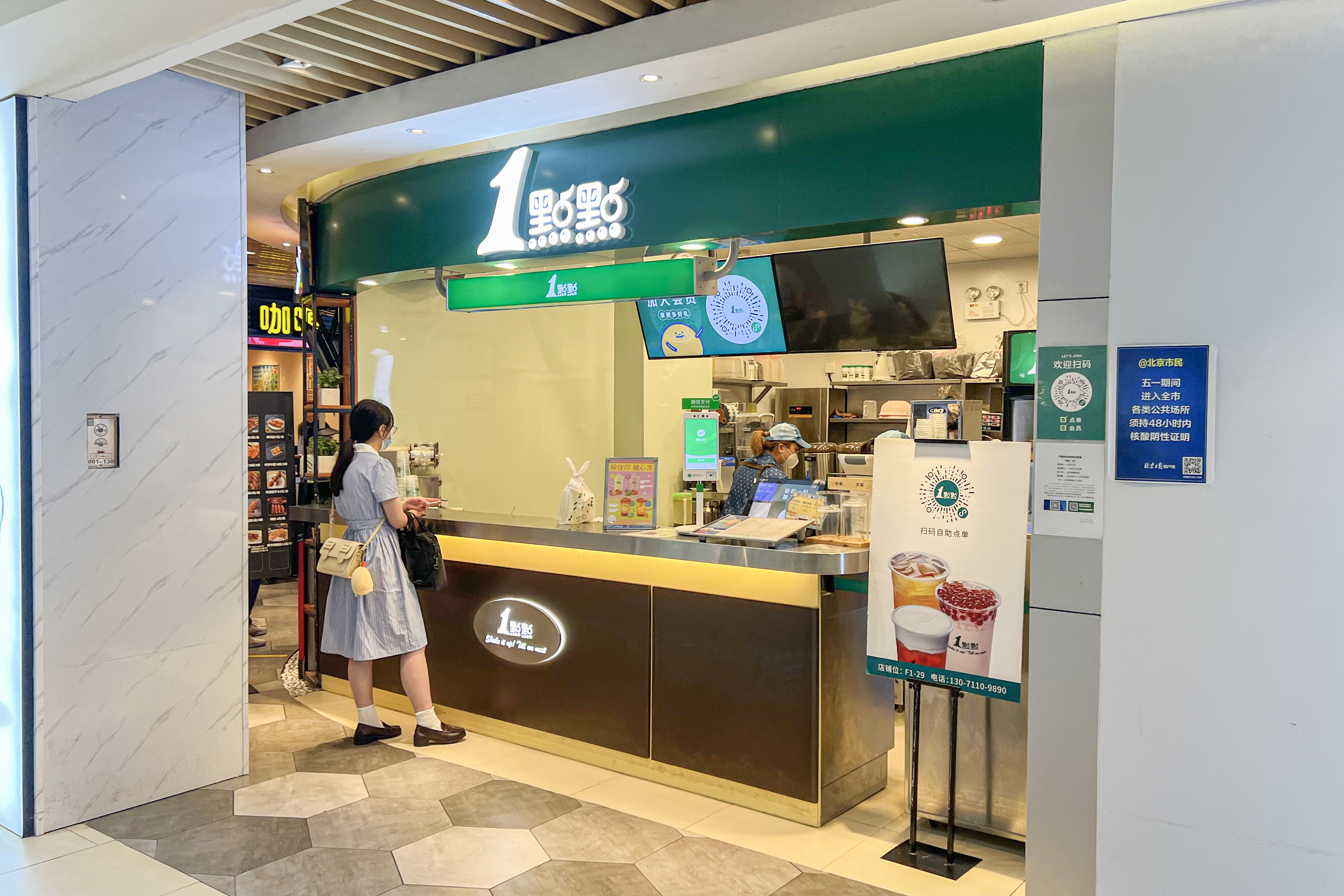
1 Diandian branch in the Fengtai district of Beijing

Lou Gengshen (Chinese: 樓更深), 50 Lan's Taipei agent, aimed to bring 50 Lan to mainland China in 2010. Like Ma Ya-fen, he discovered that the "50 Lan" name had already been registered by a mainland Chinese company. To expand the chain to mainland China, Lou established the brand 1 Diandian (Chinese: 1點點) and the management company Shenggen Catering Management (Shanghai) Co., Ltd. (Chinese: 生根餐飲管理（上海）有限公司) in 2011. Laozi's Tao Te Ching is the inspiration for the name 1 Diandian. 1 Diandian's sign features a tiny line of text at the bottom right that emphasizes its connection to 50 Lan's Taipei branch. Beginning in 2015, the brand every month added about 20 branches in mainland China, reaching 140 branches by mid-2019.

=== Wushiland Boba ===
Guo Zong-feng's Xinlan Company, which manages 50 Lan branches in the Kaohsiung and Pingtung regions, expanded the chain to the United States. Around 2016, it launched Wushiland Boba in the San Gabriel, California, strip mall Focus Plaza. The name is inspired by 50 Lan, in which wushi means 50 in pinyin while "land" alludes to "lan". The store in 2017 sold both sweet and savory waffles and tea lattes with flavors like ovaltine and red bean. A second US location was launched in Los Angeles in 2019 at the shopping mall Westfield Century City. A branch of Wushiland Boba in Richmond, British Columbia, served plum and kumquat bubble tea and green tea in 2022. A fish named Larry is the brand's mascot. The fish's back balances a boba container.

== Food safety incidents ==
During the 2011 food safety incident in Taiwan in which DEHP was found in numerous foods, KOI initially had a decline in sales in Singapore. Once the Agri-Food and Veterinary Authority of Singapore had inspected the company's products and found them safe, it regained sales. In April 2015, the health bureau of the Taichung City Government conducted testing that discovered too much of the insecticide fipronil in a beverage served at a 50 Lan Dali branch. In July 2015, the Taichung health bureau identified that green plums that 50 Lan's Kaohsiung, Pingtung, and Taitung branches had purchased had elevated sulfur dioxide concentrations. That same month, a Yunlin County company shipped 2,290 containers of honey to 50 Lan. The honey had been contaminated with the antibiotic tetracycline which the government disallows from being applied to bees. When the company disclosed this to the government, Tainan health officials conducted an examination.

While she was carrying a kettle filled with boiling water in June 2015, a former staff member at a Taichung store saw a cockroach, got startled, and lost her grip on the kettle. She was hospitalized for 30 days from the resultant burns. A court decided in October 2015 that 50 Lan would have to pay a former staff member NT$340,000 (US$12,172) in restitution. The court concluded that the store had failed to train staff members properly in safety and did not implement sufficient safety precautions even though it had previously received written warnings.

== Products ==
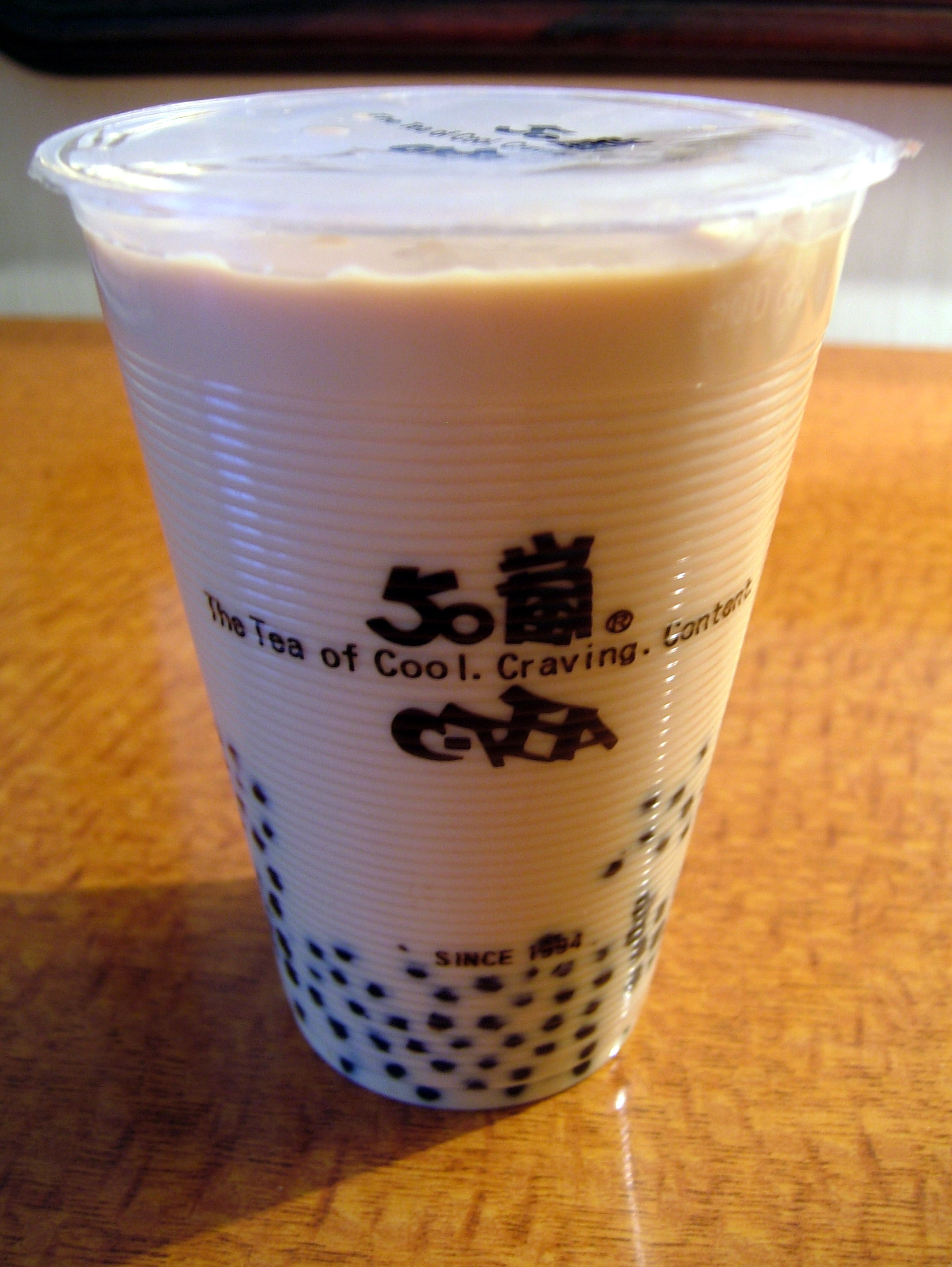
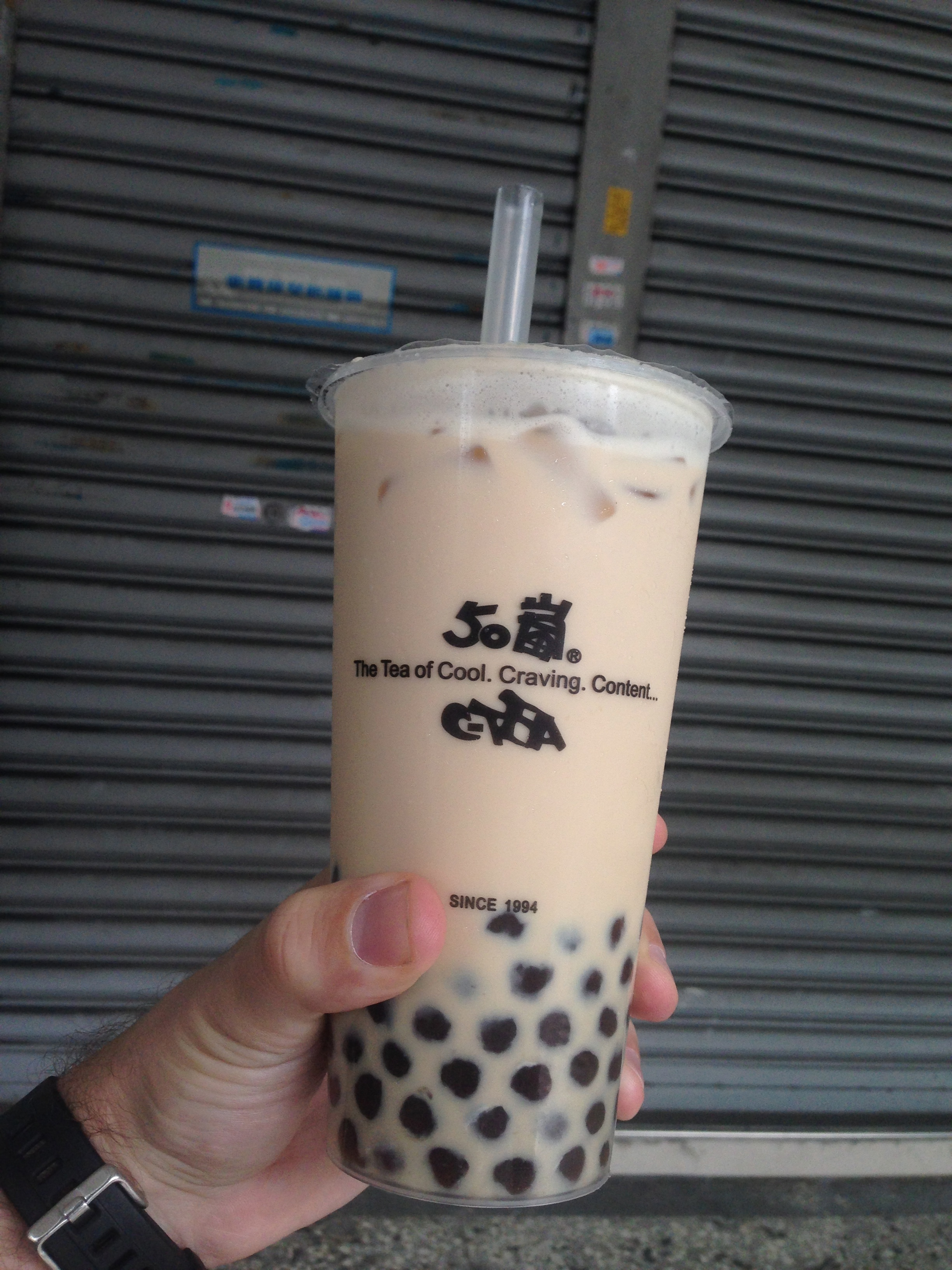
Bubble tea drinks from 50 Lan branches in Taipei and Taichung, respectively

Ma Shao-wei, 50 Lan's founder, strongly held the view that milk tea is surpassed by plain tea which underlined the critical role of careful tea base formulation. To formulate the company's primary tea base formulations when founding the company, he studied tea leaves and partnered with tea cultivators and manufacturers. Ma decided to make 50 Lan's four primary bases be clear, green, oolong, and red. To make the tea, the Taiwanese drink sector in that era commonly employed tea powder, ground tea, and juice concentrate. By instead employing tea leaves, 50 Lan distinguished itself, CommonWealth Magazine's Ashley Lo said. According to Lo, 50 Lan gradually cultivated a strong name for itself even though its tea was twice as competitive as its competitors.

The company's central office supplies the tea leaves for every 50 Lan store in Taiwan. Every region follows the brand guidelines when procuring tapioca pearls, fruit, and additional ingredients. Sales of unadulterated tea constitute 40% of the sales of stores in the central part of Taiwan. Both 50 Lan and its international brand KOI, adopted the "two-hour policy" where when not purchased within two hours, prepared tapioca pearls are thrown away. The company does this because the tapioca pearls usually develop a slimy texture with that much time elapsed.

Adopting a conservative strategy, Ma Shao-wei infrequently launches new offerings. There are 40 selections on 50 Lan's menu, whereas rival brands have between 10 and 20 more selections. According to Li Chong-zhen, Hexagon International Innovation and Digital Center's deputy general manager, the fewer selections and seldom menu changes cuts down on employee diversions since they need to retain a smaller number of standard operating procedures. Ashley Lo of CommonWealth Magazine said this promotes "consistent quality" of their products. According to the CommonWealth Magazine, in the bubble tea sector, a long-time manager shared apprehensions regarding 50 Lan's few product releases which likely would contribute to a predominantly older clientele. There is heightened competition after the worldwide growth of Chinese bubble team companies. Lo said that it is hard for 50 Lan's international brand KOI to maintain its market advantage as customers are ceasing to consider bubble tea to be an upscale product with the beverage's increasing availability.

Nearly all of 50 Lan's beverages are also served at KOI, which employees the identical cooking methods. 70% of KOI's menu features bubble tea and other classic offerings. The other 30% is designated for regional staff to create their own flavors. Japanese stores sell citrus tea, Malaysian stores sell Malacca coconut sugar milk tea, and Singaporean stores sell peanut embryo milk and Ribena blackcurrant juice. 50 Lan's Tainan main office supplies KOI's tea leaves. The company said in 2011 that KOI locations had average daily sales of between 2,000 and 3,000 glasses of bubble tea of which 90% had tapioca pearls.

== Store layout ==
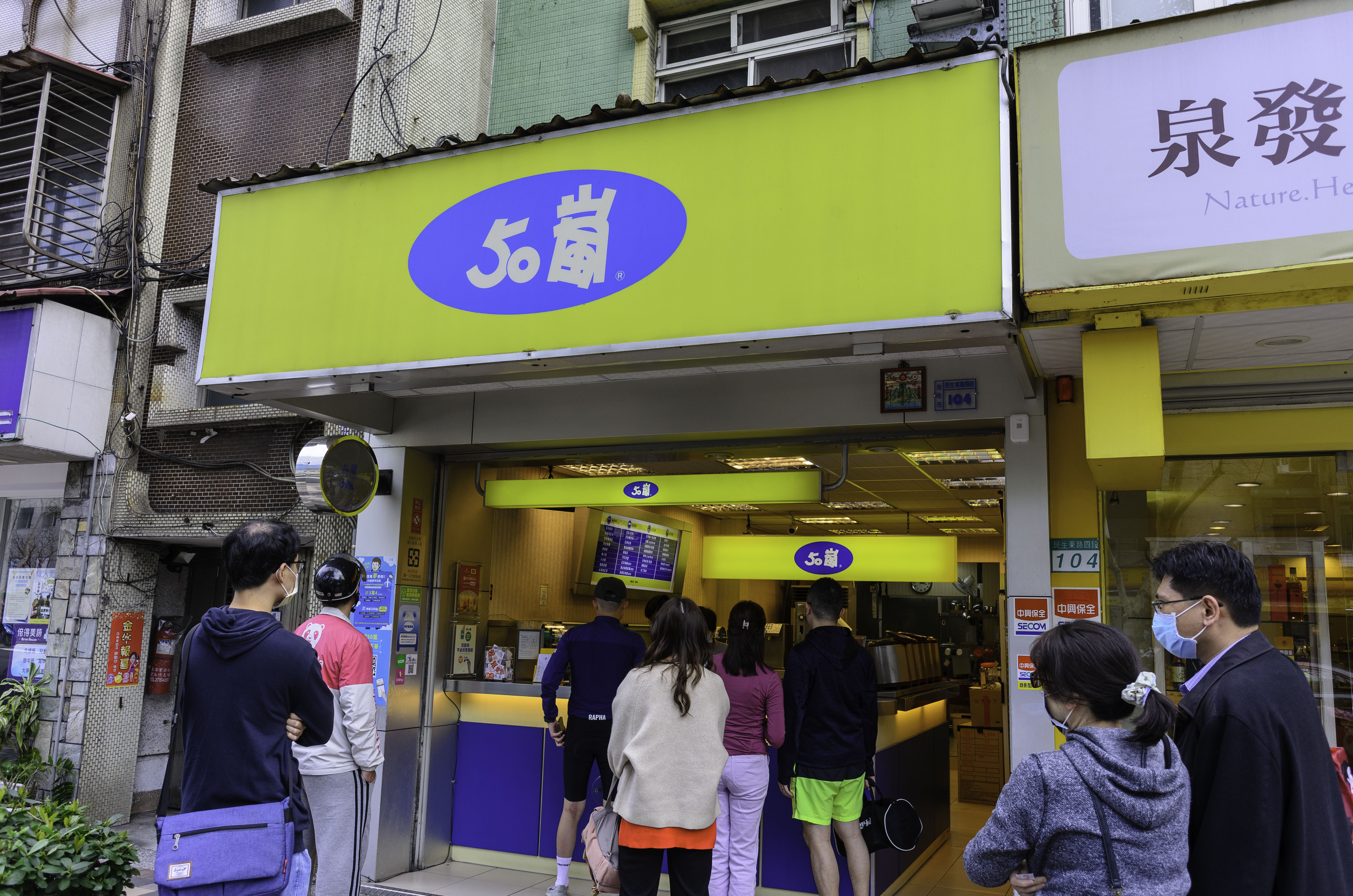
50 Lan branch on Minsheng Road in the Songshan District of Taipei

50 Lan's tea stations are situated near buyers and are equipped with reduced-height counters. The purpose is to let customers view how the tea is prepared. Contributing to this, the company requires staff members to manually measure sugar rather than employing sugar-measuring machines like their rivals started doing. The staff members employ a spoon with a long handle and rely on intuition to accurately draw out the syrup. According to Ma Ya-fen, fresh hires must train in sugar-pulling for a minimum of a week. She said numerous people ended up resigning after struggling with it.

50 Lan has a bright yellow and blue sign. According to Business Today journalist Wan Beilin, the sign is the company's most recognizable feature.
