= ALittle Tea =

Chinese tea shop chain

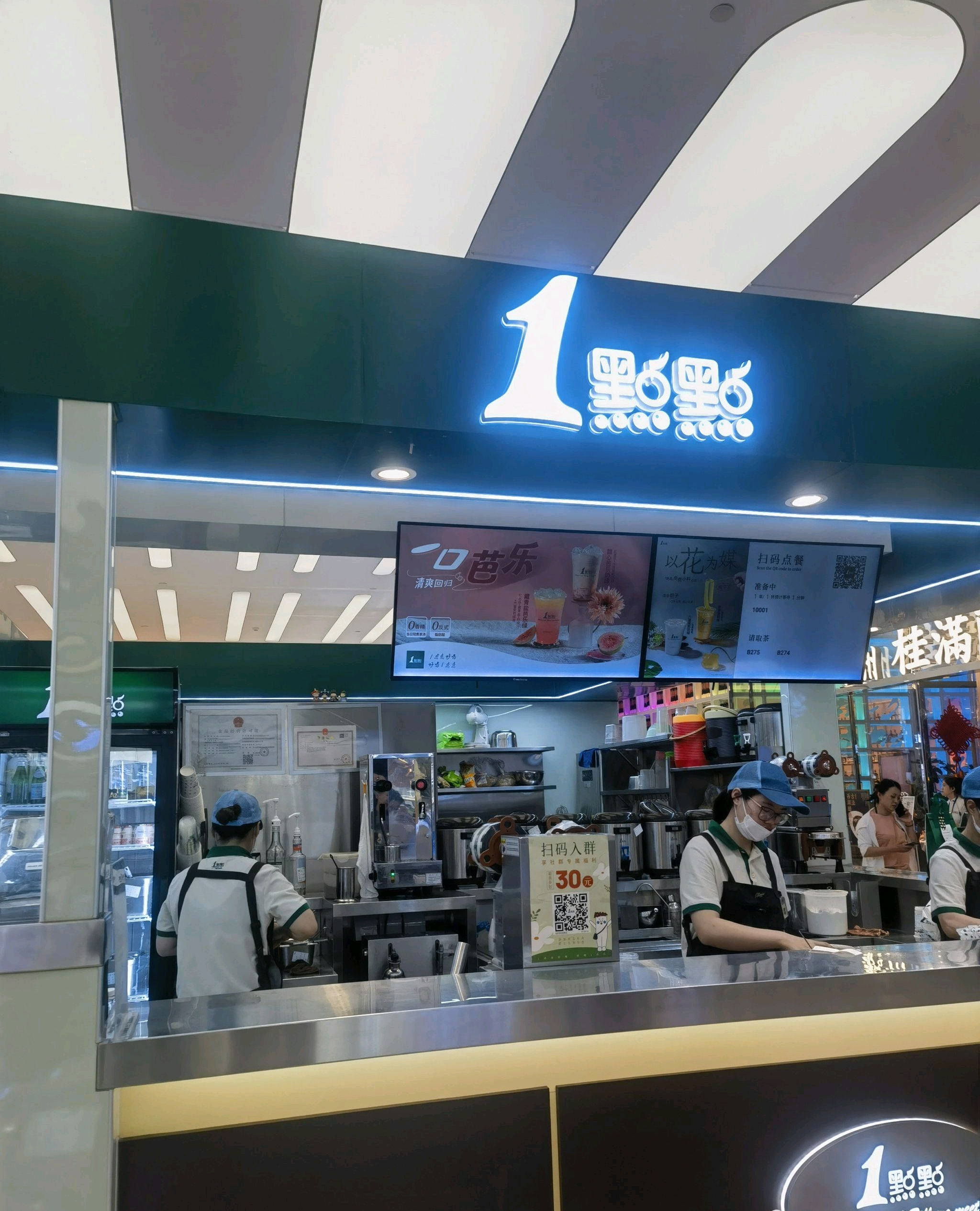
The front store picture of one of the ALittle Tea stores in Beijing

ALittle Tea (Traditional Chinese:一點點; Simplified Chinese: 一点点; pinyin: yi dian dian) is a milk tea brand founded in Shanghai in 2010 and originated from a Taiwan milk tea brand "50 Lan" founded in 1994.

It is rooted in Taiwan "hand-shaken tea" culture with hopes to bring the influence into mainland China. One of its slogans is:"A simple but skillful cup of tea."

== History ==
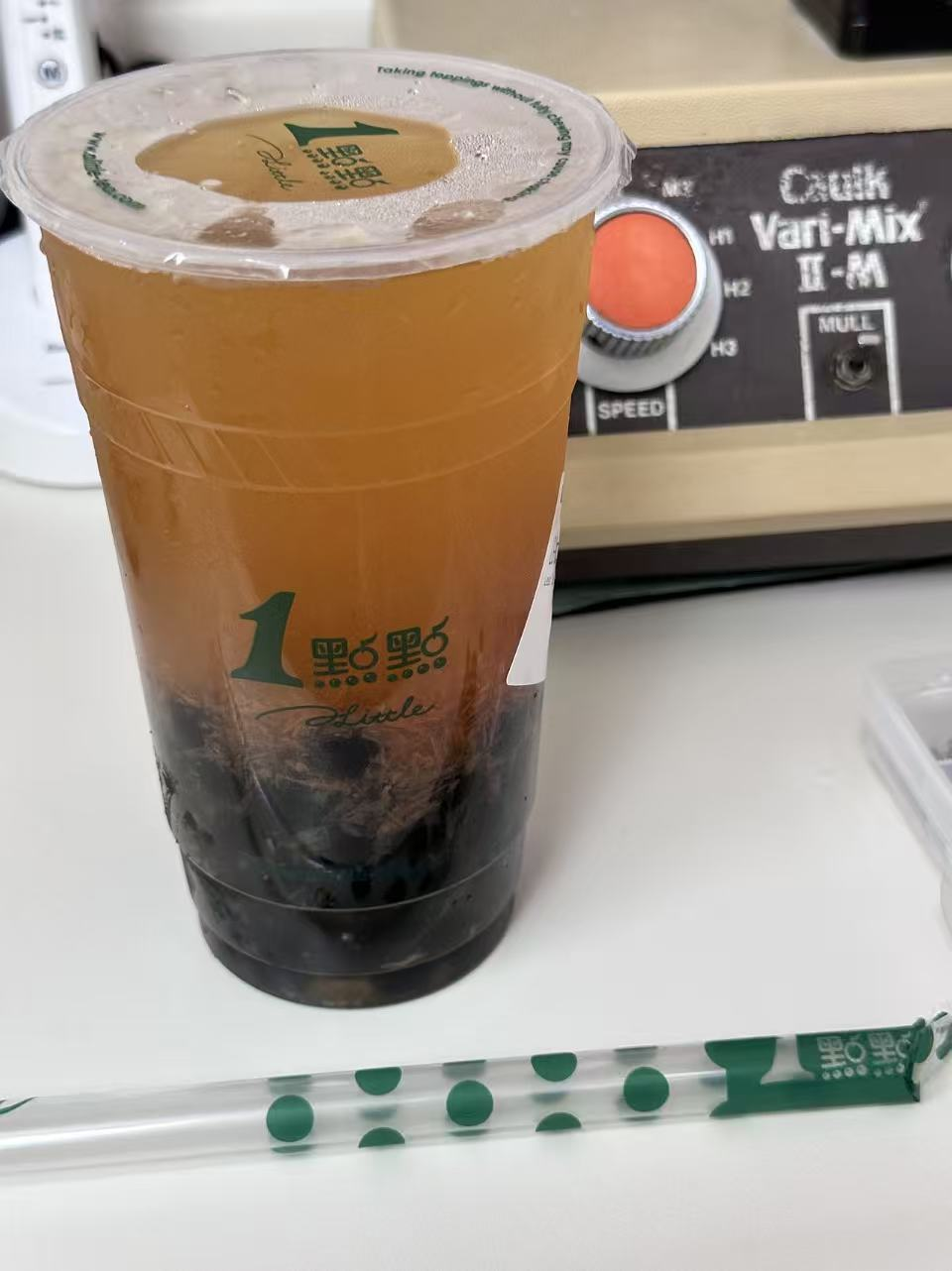
Grapefruit Green Tea

Because the brand name of "50 Lan" had already been registered by mainland China, in 2010, the Taipei regional agent of 50 Lan, Shengen Tea Co., established a new brand,"ALittle Tea" in Shanghai. In 2011, Shengen Catering Management (Shanghai) Co., was officially founded. In February, 2012, the first store is opened in Shanghai.

Starting in 2015, ALittle Tea rapidly expanded its stores across more than 40 cities in China. In 2019, it opened 891 new stores. In 2020, 783 new stores, and in 2021, 525 new stores. The brand has also expanded internationally in several countries including United States, South Korea, and Japan.

As of February, 2021, ALittle Tea had over 4,000 stores in China. As of November, 2023, the number of ALittle Tea stores had decreased to 3,018 over 26 provinces across China. Based on this data, in just over two years, ALittle Tea has closed nearly 1,000 stores representing a decline of approximately 25%.

== Charitable Donations ==
ALittle Tea has partnered with a charity to support young students in their education. The company's donations have helped support the renovation of 210 houses owned by poor families in rural communities to encourage their children, and especially daughters, to continue pursuing education. Ninety percent of ALittle Tea’s customers are women, in part because ALittle Tea advertises these donations that go towards supporting rural girls' education. These renovations have included fixing leaking roofs and removing piles of clutter. While many of the donations go towards the families of young girls, the charity helps children of all genders. In February of 2026, a young boy was donated a desk and educational books by the charity. It was also announced that volunteers had gifted the young boy comic books after learning the boy wanted them.

== Controversy ==
=== Kitchen Cleanliness Standards and Response ===
ALittle Tea has experienced some controversy over the cleanliness of their kitchens and how they have responded to customers’ complaints. For example, in 2020, a woman in Ningbo, Zhejiang, found a hair in a drink purchased from ALittle Tea. When the customer returned to the store to ask for a refund, she reported being treated dismissively by employees and was unable to come to an agreement with the store manager about a refund. The store owner then called the police on the customer on the grounds that she was disrupting business. Afterwards, the customer posted to social media about the issue, and was contacted by authorities informing her that ALittle Tea headquarters intended to sue her for her allegations against the company, and they claimed that the hair had not come from their kitchen.

=== Issues with Counterfiting ===
There was a counterfeit brand named Yaoyi ALittle Tea, which became popular around 2019. The logo and design of Yaoyi ALittle Tea are almost the same as ALittle Tea. The only difference is that “Yaoyi” Chinese characters use gray color, which is very weak in the background logo, and the font size is very small, which is hard for customers to distinguish such a small difference. One of the Yaoyi ALittle Tea managers said they knew Yaoyi ALittle Tea was a counterfeit of ALittle Tea, but becoming an authorized dealer of an official ALittle Tea is too difficult since it is much more expensive to franchise, includes tedious background checks, and requires a lot of paperwork. The parent company of Yaoyi ALittle Tea said that if there was any dispute with ALittle Tea, they would handle it. So some of the managers were satisfied with the solutions and thought they could also make good business as long as they put effort into it.

ALittle Tea finally noticed this unfair competition and sued Yaoyi ALittle Tea later. In 2021, Shenzhen Futian District People’s Court announced that ALittle Tea successfully protected its rights and required Yaoyi ALittle Tea to pay 1 million Chinese yuan to ALittle Tea.

Since legal awareness continues to be improved nowadays, ALittle Tea has become more successful in protecting its legitimate rights in recent years.
