= Liberty Landing =

Liberty Landing may refer to:

- Liberty Landing, Alberta, a residential community in the hamlet of Gasoline Alley in Red Deer County, Alberta, Canada
- Liberty Landing Ferry, a water taxi servicing Liberty State Park
- Liberty Landing Marina, the marina at Liberty State Park, Jersey City, New Jersey
