= Howl at the Moon =

American live music venue chain

- Headquarters: Chicago, Illinois United States
- Number of locations: 14, plus cruise ships and a traveling show
- Website: www.howlatthemoon.com

Howl at the Moon is an American chain of live music venues, generally referred to as piano bars, established in 1990. As of 2024, the franchise had 14 locations in U.S. cities, plus locations on Norwegian Cruise Line ships. The company has also produced a traveling version of their dueling piano concept, which has been used for entertainment at charitable fundraising events.

== History ==
The first Howl at the Moon location, owned by Terry Cunningham and Jimmy Bernstein, opened in the newly opened Convington waterfront of Cincinnati, Ohio, in 1990, and was variously described as "a new Orleans-style bistro with dueling pianos, dancing and peanuts sent down chutes for customers", and "featuring piano singalongs to the music of the '50s, '60s, and '70s in a setting including a fireplace, pool tables, and big screen televisions". A review of the waterfront noted that "its instant hit seems to be the Howl-at-the-Moon Saloon", describing the venue as having "two baby grands manned by a pair of wild and crazy guys who spice old rock 'n' roll tunes with jokes dusted off from vaudeville and every audience-participation gimmick known to man".

The following year, the owners began planning to franchise the venue to locations identified in Cleveland and Columbus, stating at the time that they "had inquiries from nearly every major city about bringing a Howl at the Moon there", and citing as the key impediment to such expansion "finding the keyboard players that fit our entertainment". The Cleveland location was initially described as "an even bigger hit with lines forming up to two hours before showtime". In 1992, Michael Lavery, who had helped to open the Ohio locations, opened a bar based on the concept but named "Rebell Yell", in Boston, Massachusetts. The first actual Howl at the Moon location outside of Ohio was opened in Orlando, Florida, in January 1993, with various locations opening and closing around the United States thereafter. The franchise had an international location in Singapore in 2010.

Beginning in 2015, the company also produced a traveling version of the concept called "Howl on the Go" or "Howl2GO", which appeared in local theatres and bars able to accommodate the performances and drink service. The traveling version has served as entertainment for charitable fundraising events.

Reviews from the early 2020s note that "with bars in 15 U.S. cities... and an at-sea program with Norwegian Cruise Lines, Howl at the Moon is known for its dueling piano show, where two pianists take turns fielding song requests from the crowd", and that "live music shows happen nightly, with two 'dueling' piano players and a rotating mix of other musicians cranking out anthemic dance hits and sing-a-long songs from the '70s to the present".

== Theme ==
Musicians perform on a variety of instruments including pianos, drums, guitars and horns, though the centerpiece is the dueling pianists, "performing hit songs and taking audience requests". The theme driving Howl at the Moon is a high-energy show based on party anthems. The venue is also known for its 86 oz. mixed drink buckets including drinks called hurricanes and "adios mofos". As one source described it, "Howl at the Moon is known for dueling pianos and big buckets of fruity booze drinks".

== Locations ==
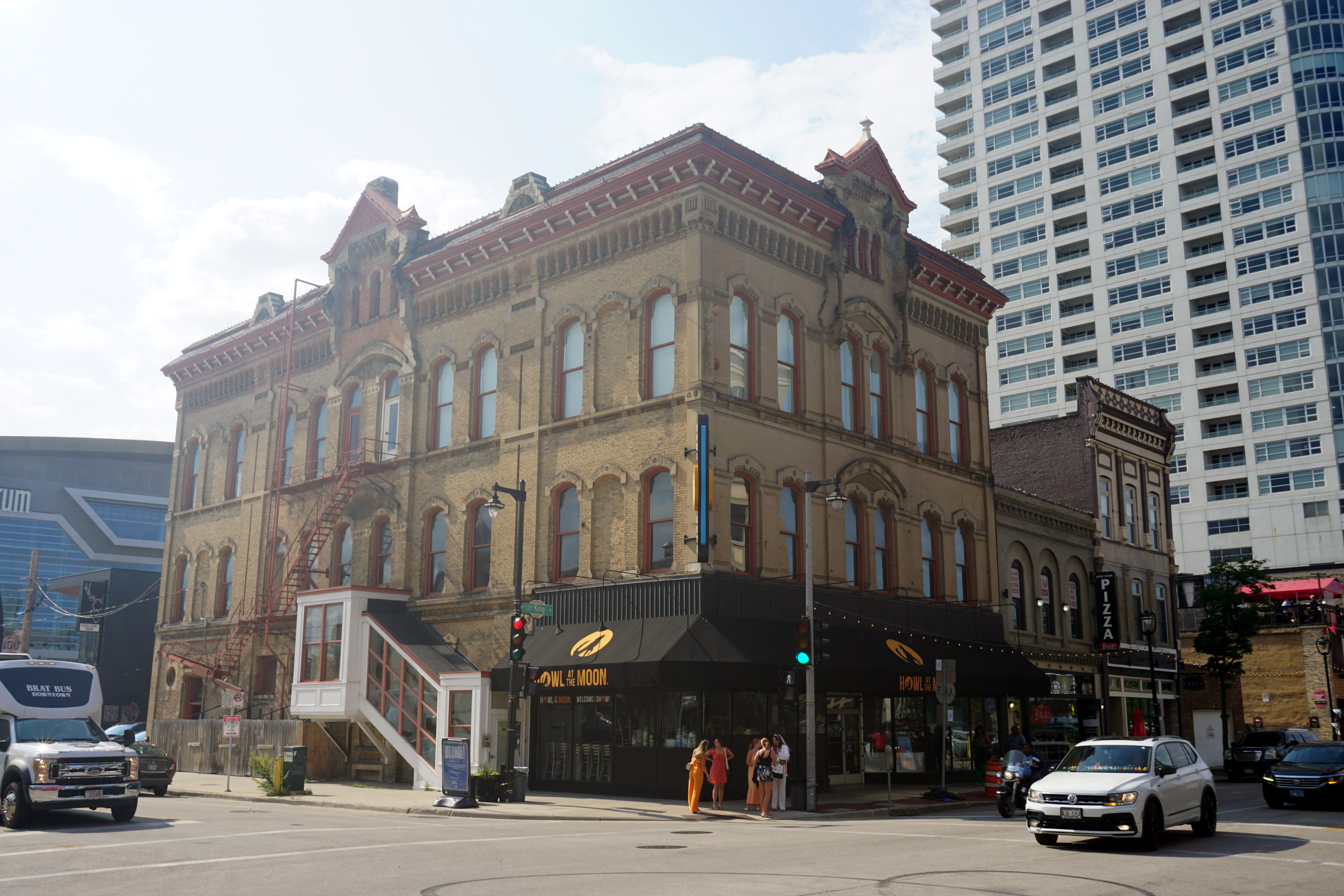
Howl at the Moon in Milwaukee

As of November 2025, Howl at the Moon has 10 locations in the United States, plus 2 other clubs not under the name. the Merkaba San in San Antonio, TX and Down Nightclub in Boston, MA.

- Boston, Massachusetts
- Chicago, Illinois
- Fort Lauderdale, Florida
- Foxborough, Massachusetts
- Indianapolis, Indiana
- Kansas City, Missouri
- Louisville, Kentucky
- Orlando, Florida
- Pittsburgh, Pennsylvania
- San Antonio, Texas

Various other cities have also had Howl at the Moon locations for different periods. These include:

- Baltimore, Maryland
- Charlotte, North Carolina
- Cincinnati, Ohio
- Cleveland, Ohio
- Columbus, Ohio
- Denver, Colorado.
- Destin, Florida
- Hollywood, California
- Milwaukee, Wisconsin
- Miami, Florida
- Minneapolis, Minnesota
- Philadelphia, Pennsylvania
- Scottsdale, Arizona
- Singapore
- Washington, D.C.
