= Frank Ribaudo =

American businessman (1944–2026)

- Born: December 30, 1944; New York City, U.S.
- Died: July 7, 2026 (aged 81)
- Occupation: Nightclub owner
- Known for: Founder of Club Café

Frank Ribaudo (December 20, 1944 – July 7, 2026) was an American businessman whose ventures centered around LGBTQ-themed businesses and organizations in Boston. He is most known as the co-founder of Club Café in Back Bay.

== Early life ==
On December 30, 1944, in Brooklyn, New York, Ribaudo was born to Caroline and Frank Ribaudo.

Ribaudo studied Hospitality Management at New York City Community College and was in the military for eight years during the Vietnam war.

Following his years in the military, Ribaudo lived in Southern California. He then moved to Chelmsford, Massachusetts and began restoring brownstones in Boston.

== Career ==
In 1983, after Ribaudo and friends were targeted for being gay at Back Bay Racquetball, they went on to open Metropolitan Health Club, a gay-friendly gym. In the mid-1980s, Ribaudo and Joseph McAllaster “opened Club Café as a place where members could gather after workouts”.

Club Café was challenging to keep open in its first years due to discrimination against the gay community and the stigma of the HIV/AIDS crisis. Ribaudo stated that he was afraid of bankruptcy and didn’t make any profit in the first five years. During the AIDS crisis Ribaudo used the club “to host community dinners, meetings, and group discussions for people to learn from each other, seek support, and research the latest treatments”. Club Café’s cofounder, McAllaster, died in 1993 of complications from AIDS at age 38.

In 2003, Ribaudo co-founded the Harbor to the Bay AIDS Benefit Bike Ride and served as treasurer, crew member, and organizer for 22 years. The benefit has raised over 6 million dollars for HIV/AIDS organizations.

Ribaudo created a community support fund, donating all of Club Café’s money raised through coat checks and recycling to LGBTQIA sports leagues. According to the venue’s general manager, James Morgrage, Club Café donates $30,000 annually to sports leagues.

In 2013, Ribaudo and his business partner, Morgrage, were presented with HIV organization, Boston Living Center’s, Peter Daniel Clark Award. In 2016, Ribaudo was honored with the Dr. Cal Cohen Founder’s Award from the Community Research Initiative.

== Personal life and death ==
In 2013, during the thirtieth year anniversary of Club Café, Ribaudo married his long term partner, Joe Posa. They were together 25 years. Posa is a drag queen who has performed at Club Café.

On July 7, 2026, Ribaudo died after being diagnosed with glioblastoma two years prior. He was 81. Ribaudo's husband, Joe Posa, stated, "Frank chose to stop treatment and received hospice care at home in his final days."
