= Elaine Noble =

American politician (born 1944)

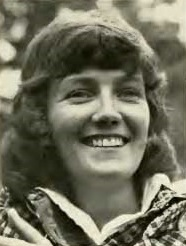
- Noble c. 1975

Member of the Massachusetts House of Representatives from the 6th Suffolk district district
- In office January 1, 1975 – January 1, 1979

Personal details
- Born: January 22, 1944 (age 82) New Kensington, Pennsylvania
- Party: Democratic

Elaine Noble (born January 22, 1944) is an American politician and LGBT activist who served in the Massachusetts House of Representatives for two terms starting in January 1975. She was the first openly lesbian or gay candidate elected to a state legislature. She served two terms as representative for the Fenway–Kenmore and Back Bay neighborhoods of Boston.

== Early life and education ==
Elaine Noble was born in New Kensington, Pennsylvania, on January 22, 1944. After graduating high school, she worked for a year in a factory before enrolling at Boston University on a scholarship. Noble earned her B.F.A degree from BU in 1966, an M.S. in speech and education at Emerson College in 1970, and an M.Ed. at Harvard University in 1974. At Emerson, she served as an Emerson Homophile Arts Society advisor and co-director of the Massachusetts Women's Political Caucus. After graduation, she worked at a job-year women's school where she came out as a lesbian.

== Activism ==
Before entering politics, Noble worked as a speech instructor and an advertising manager.

She was involved in LGBT rights activism in Boston. She was a member of the local chapter of the Daughters of Bilitis. In 1974, Noble participated in a televised debate on the topic of same-sex marriage. Noble helped organize Boston's early Pride marches. With Ann Lewis, sister of former U.S. Representative from Massachusetts Barney Frank, Noble formed the Massachusetts Women's Political Caucus and served on the Governor's Commission on the Status of Women. Noble was a family friend of Lewis and Frank's, and worked on the campaign that got Frank elected to the State legislature.

== Political career ==
=== Massachusetts House of Representatives ===
External videos
- “Something Personal; A Woman's Place Is In The House: A Portrait of Elaine Noble” is a documentary about Elaine Noble, the first openly gay person elected to a state legislature and began serving in the Massachusetts House of Representatives in 1975 produced by WGBH Educational Foundation.

In 1974, Noble was elected to the state House of Representatives for the 6th Suffolk district with 59% of the vote. against Joseph P. Cimino, the part-owner of a chain of singles bars She has described the campaign as "very ugly", including "shooting through my windows, destroying my car, breaking windows at my campaign headquarters, [and] serious harassment". Her election made her the first openly LGBT candidate elected to a state-level office in the United States. She was sworn into office on New Year's Day 1975 by governor Michael Dukakis.

As an educator, Noble supported desegregation of Boston public schools. She encouraged her campaigners to oversee school pick-ups and drop-offs for children in her district. She was the only white member of the Boston delegation that rode school busses with the children. Her support angered her constituents, both conservative as well as gay and lesbian, who expected her to focus solely on gay and lesbian issues. Her house was vandalized and she was threatened with a gun. She also felt burdened and frustrated by the demands of gay men and lesbians who seemed to expect that she speak for all of them. She said, "The gay community expected me to be on call 24 hours a day. It was like they felt they owned me."

Noble was an early critic of Father Paul Shanley, a Catholic priest who was ultimately convicted of sex crimes in 2005. She reported Shanley's comments and behavior to Boston officials on several occasions in the 1970s to no avail.

Noble was re-elected in 1976 with almost 90% of the vote, and her second two-year term started on January 1, 1977.

In March 1977, Noble was part of the first delegation of gay men and lesbians invited to the White House under President Jimmy Carter to discuss issues important to the LGBT community.

=== 1978 United States Senate campaign ===
After two terms in the Massachusetts House, Noble ran for the United States Senate in 1978. Her campaign received endorsements from United States House Speaker Tip O'Neill and his son, Massachusetts Lieutenant Governor Thomas P. O'Neill III. She finished last out of five Democrats who competed in the primary, with 52,464 votes (5.8%). She did not run for re-election to the House.

=== Later work in politics ===
She later went to work for Mayor of Boston Kevin White. Noble was required to testify in front of a grand jury for nineteen hours in connection with an FBI investigation into bribery in the mayor's office. No charges were brought against Noble.

After leaving Mayor White's office, Noble established Noble Consulting, a healthcare consulting group. In 1986, Noble and Ellen Ratner formed an LGBT alcohol and drug treatment center in Minneapolis called the Pride Institute. She attempted to establish a similar center in Massachusetts, but was rebuffed by local government. Noble ran unsuccessfully for the Cambridge, Massachusetts city council in 1991 and 1993. In her 1991 campaign, she expressed support for rent control policies, a domestic partnership ordinance, and direct election of the city's mayor. Noble also ran on fiscal responsibility at the city-level, offering ideas for cutting spending without raising taxes or cutting funding to essential services.

Despite some policy differences, including on abortion, Noble endorsed Francis X. Bellotti as Democratic candidate in the 1990 Massachusetts gubernatorial race.

== Retirement from public life ==
In 1994, Noble took work as head administrator at Middlesex County Hospital but resigned after six months.

In 2009, she made a rare fundraising appearance at a Stonewall gala benefiting Compass Community Center in Lake Worth, Florida.

== Personal life ==
Noble had a relationship with writer Rita Mae Brown in the 1970s and has since retained privacy regarding her personal life. She lives in Florida, where she is still active in the Democratic Party.

== Legacy ==
In 2015, she was named by the Equality Forum as one of their 31 Icons of the 2015 LGBT History Month.

Noble's successful election in 1974 inspired Minnesota Senator Allan Spear to come out as gay while in-office, making him the first male legislator in the United States to do so.

== See also ==
- 169th Massachusetts General Court
- LGBT culture in Boston
- List of the first LGBT holders of political offices
