= Piano bar =

Informal public venue for pianist

A piano bar (also known as a piano lounge) consists of a piano or electronic keyboard played by a professional musician as a central part of an establishment that also serves alcoholic drinks. Piano bars can be located in a cocktail lounge, bar, hotel lobby, office building lobby, restaurant, or on a cruise ship. Usually the pianist receives a small salary plus tips in a jar or basket on or near the piano, especially from patrons requesting a song. Such requests are often written on a beverage napkin. Some piano bars feature a baby grand or grand piano surrounded by stools for patrons (or, an upright piano or digital piano encased by a cabinet resembling a grand piano). Others have a bar surrounding the piano or keyboard.

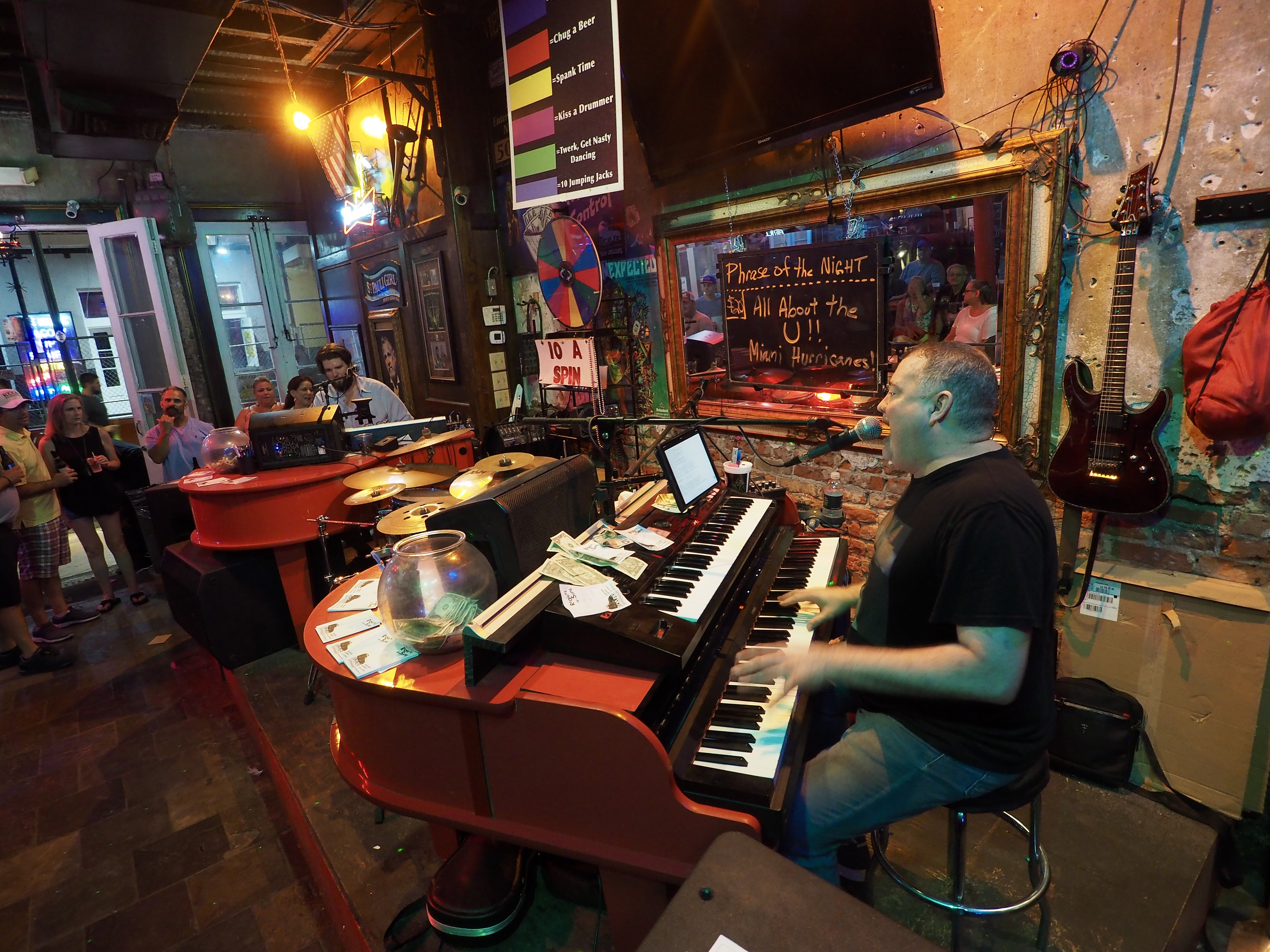
Dueling pianos at Tickler's Bar in New Orleans

== Description ==
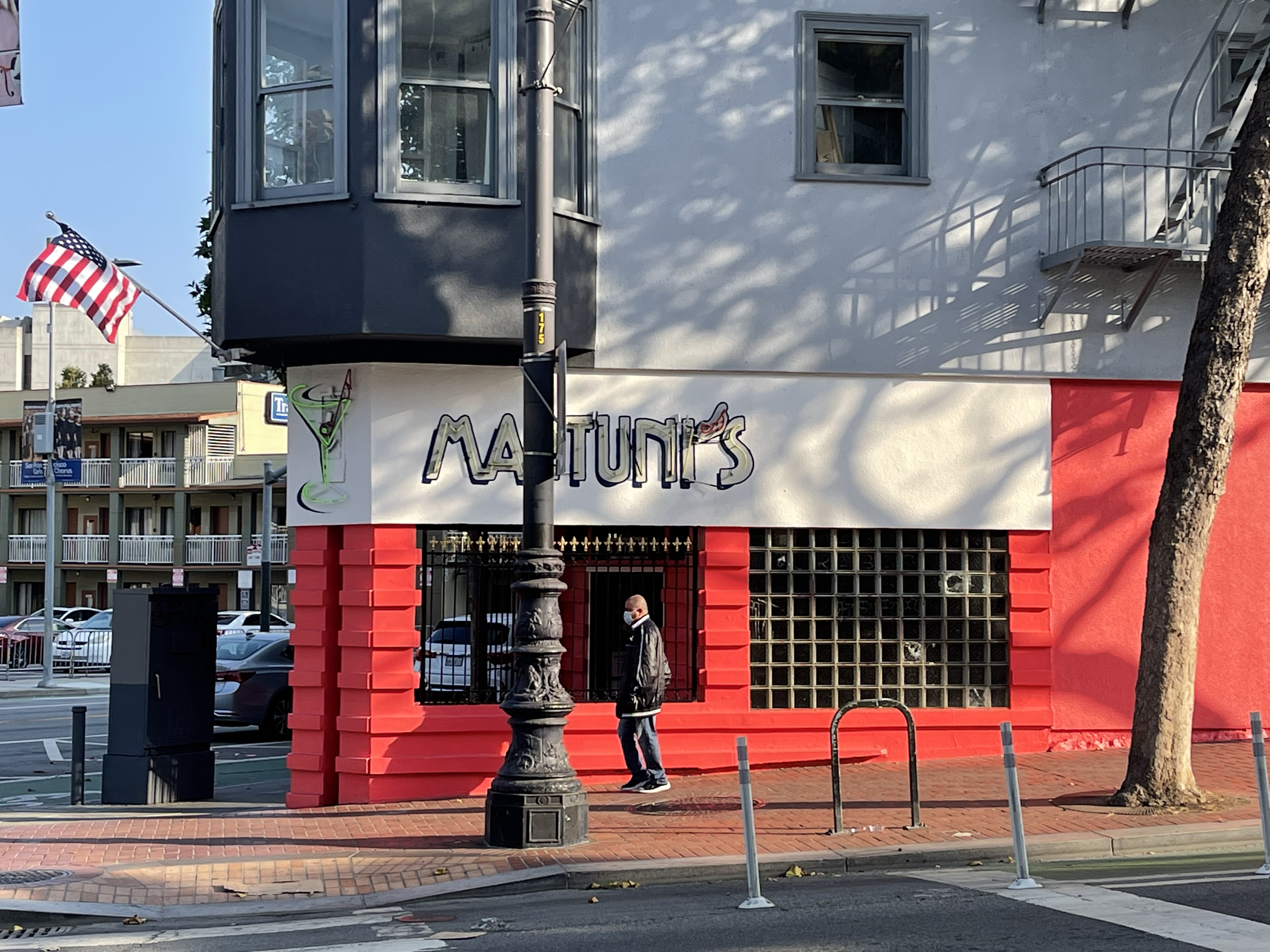
Martuni's, one of the last piano bars in San Francisco, California.

Theatre historian John Kenrick describes the piano bar as follows:

A piano bar is a hybrid creature: part performance space, part living room, part cruise-a-thon, and part saloon. The bar is there to sell drinks, the pianist is there to perform, and the crowd is there to sing, listen, drink and socialize. All of this means that it's impossible to predict what a given evening's chemistry will be, even if most of the people on hand are regular customers.... While every factor counts, the most important issue is the person at the piano. The pianist determines the type of music, the style of performance, and the general tone of the evening.... The experienced piano bar player knows how to take genial control of most any situation and generally keep the party going.

The American minimalist composer Terry Riley, who worked as a cocktail pianist when younger, later offered this "religious" view of the profession:

Having worked for years as a lounge lizard, I was smitten with the insight that the cocktail pianist is signaled out to conduct his ritual of group urban chanting on the themes of love and existence—a kind of medicine man at the ever-present altaric piano, surrounded by his boozy tribe sipping sacraments in the circle of our common misery.

== Types ==
There are several types of piano bars:

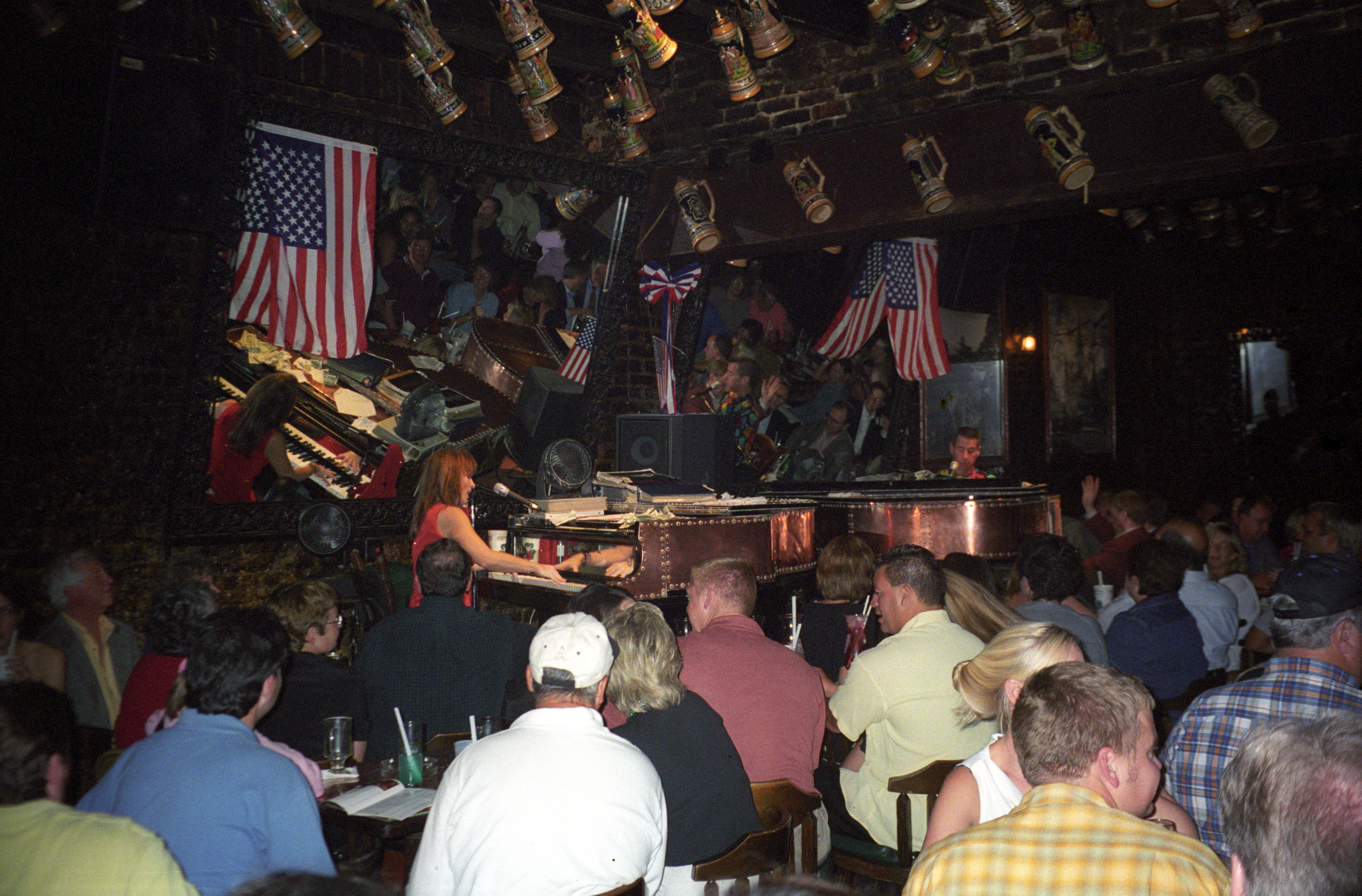
Two pianists playing at O'Brien's Piano Bar in New Orleans

- Instrumental only: the professional piano/keyboard player plays strictly instrumental music, which is usually classical, jazz, or easy listening; this type of piano bar is often found in hotel lobby lounges or fine dining restaurants and upscale bars.
- "One-man band": The musician uses an electronic keyboard equipped with built-in accompaniment function and music sequencers to emulate the sounds of a live band, usually in MIDI format. It is mainly popular in Europe and Asia, often playing regional popular music.
- Only the musician sings: the professional piano/keyboard player sings to his/her accompaniment, usually on microphone, but no other singers are generally allowed. An example is the Carousel Piano Bar & Lounge in New Orleans, Louisiana.
- Dueling pianos: usually on stage with two grand pianos, each played by a professional player who sing and entertain; humor and audience participation are important. Usually these bars have substantial sound systems, and most of the songs performed are rock and roll, classic rock, Top 40, R&B or country, sometimes played by request. An early example of the format is the dueling piano entertainments which began at the second location of Pat O'Brien's Bar in New Orleans in 1942. Numerous popular clubs offer the sing-along format, while the Howl at the Moon and Pete's Dueling Piano Bar chains of piano bars, Shake Rattle & Roll Dueling Pianos in New York City and The Big Bang Dueling Piano Bar in Nashville, Tennessee feature full performance shows, often with singing and dancing by their wait staff.
- Musician and servers sing: the professional musician sings and also invites servers to sing solos. In this type of bar, the servers are selected for having both serving and singing skills. Don't Tell Mama in New York City is one such establishment, though it is also an open mic.
- Sing-along: patrons surrounding the piano/keyboard sing as a group, usually without microphones, often preferring standards, show tunes, pop and rock. It is "a social venue for singing". Examples include Marie's Crisis Cafe and The Duplex in Greenwich Village.
- Open mic: individual patrons sing (on microphone) to the accompaniment of the professional musician; in some ways, this type of piano bar is like karaoke, except that the music is live and dynamic, and there are usually no lyrics available (although some piano bar players do supply some lyrics); like karaoke, the songs performed may cover a wide, eclectic range (show tunes, standards from the 1920s forward, jazz, country, R&B, rock'n'roll, blues, folk, soul, disco, hip-hop, etc.); the patron singers are usually called to the microphone in a rotating order; often, each singer is allowed two or three songs each time he/she is called to perform. The Alley in Oakland, California and Martuni's in San Francisco use this format.
- Combination: some piano bars include the characteristics of two or more of the above, either on different nights or combined on the same night.

== Awards ==
The Manhattan Association of Cabarets has presented various MAC Awards to piano bar performers annually since 1998. In 2025, the awards were given to "piano bar instrumentalists" and "piano bar singing entertainers", one in uptown and one in downtown Manhattan.

== Other piano bars ==
- Cab Kaye's Jazz Piano Bar in Amsterdam where Cab Kaye performed, when not touring, five nights a week from 1979 until 1988
- Harry's New York Bar in Paris and its piano bar "Ivories" where George Gershwin composed An American in Paris
- Rick's Café Casablanca in Casablanca, Morocco, designed to recreate the bar made famous in the film Casablanca

== Notable piano bar performers ==
Jimmy Durante started as a piano bar player, as did Billy Joel. Joel's classic hit "Piano Man" is based on his experiences as a piano bar player. Italian tenor Andrea Bocelli also played in piano bars to pay for singing lessons.

== In popular culture ==
- The Fabulous Baker Boys is a 1989 American romantic comedy-drama musical film. It features "dueling pianos" music. Real-life brothers Jeff Bridges and Beau Bridges star as two brothers struggling to make a living as lounge jazz pianists in Seattle.

== See also ==
- Lounge music
