= Hotel Metropolitan Premier Taipei =

Hotel in Zhongshan, Taipei, Taiwan

Hotel Metropolitan Premier Taipei JR 東日本大飯店台北
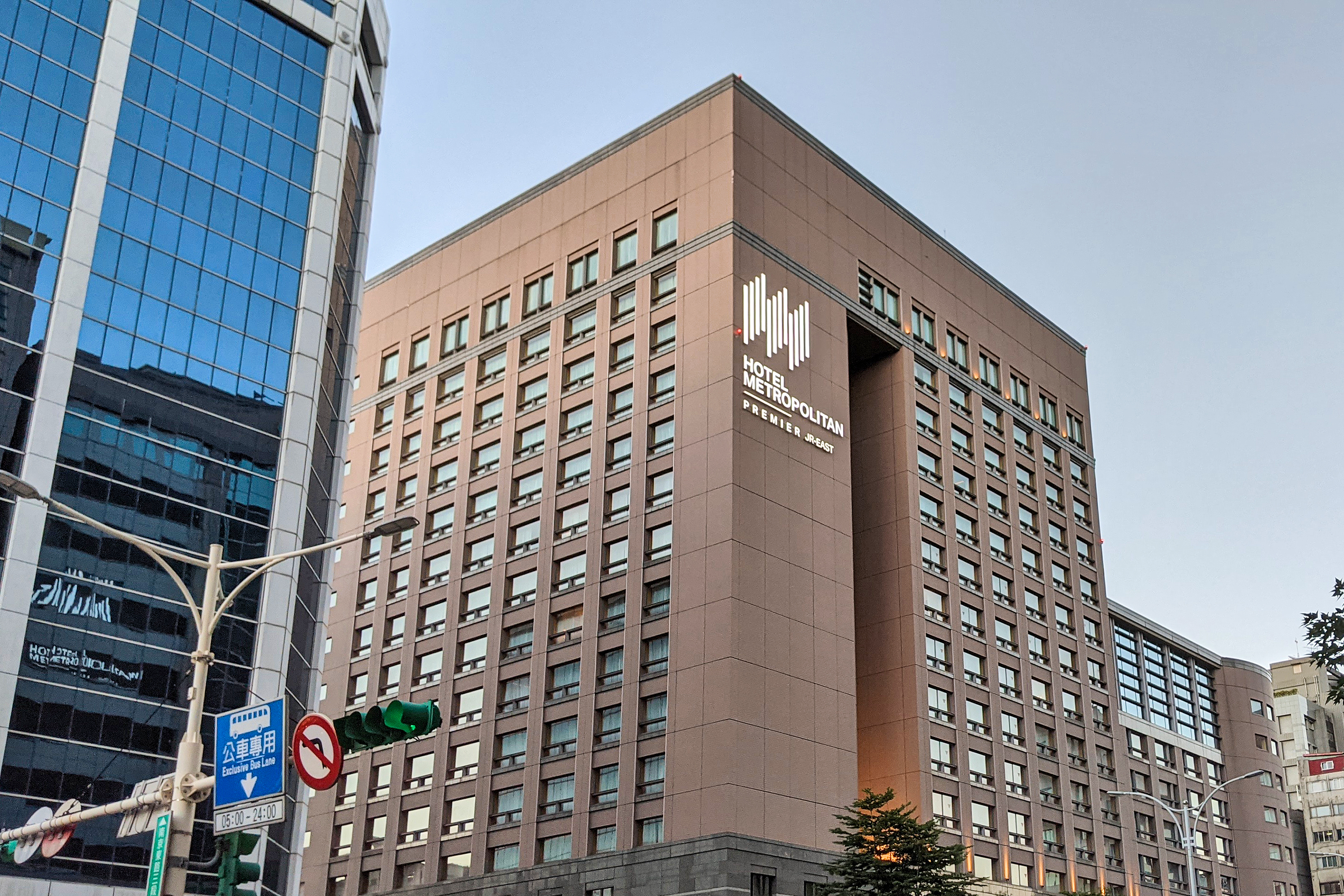
- Interactive map of the Hotel Metropolitan Premier Taipei; JR 東日本大飯店台北 area

General information
- Location: No. 133, Section 3, Nanjing East Road, Zhongshan District, Taipei, Taiwan
- Coordinates: 25°03′08″N 121°32′27″E
- Opening: 23 August 2021
- Management: JR Hotel Group

Technical details
- Floor count: 15 above ground

Other information
- Number of rooms: 288 (including suites)
- Number of suites: 31
- Number of restaurants: 3

Website
- Hotel Metropolitan Premier Taipei Website

Hotel Metropolitan Premier Taipei (Chinese：JR 東日本大飯店台北, Japanese: ホテルメトロポリタン プレミア 台北) is a five star hotel located in Zhongshan District, Taipei, Taiwan. The hotel opened on 23 August 2021 and is the first overseas branch operated by JR Hotel Group, an affiliate of East Japan Railway Company. The hotel occupied the building on Nanjing East Road, which is owned by Cathay Life and has remained idle for the past 10 months after the previous tenant Westin Taipei ceased operations in January.

== Location ==
The hotel is located at the heart of Taipei, near Taipei Songshan Airport, and Taipei Main Station. It is one minute's walk from Nanjing Fuxing metro station.

== Facilities ==
Hotel Metropolitan Premier Taipei is operated by JR Hotel Group and offers a total of 288 guest rooms and suites, spanning a total of 15 floors. It features three restaurants, including Japanese cuisine and Chinese cuisine, as well as banquet rooms, swimming pools, fitness facilities and other modern amenities. The hotel's facilities aim to meet the diverse needs of guests staying for both business and leisure.

== See also ==
- Regent Taipei
