= Yifang Taiwan Fruit Tea =

Taiwanese bubble tea shop chain

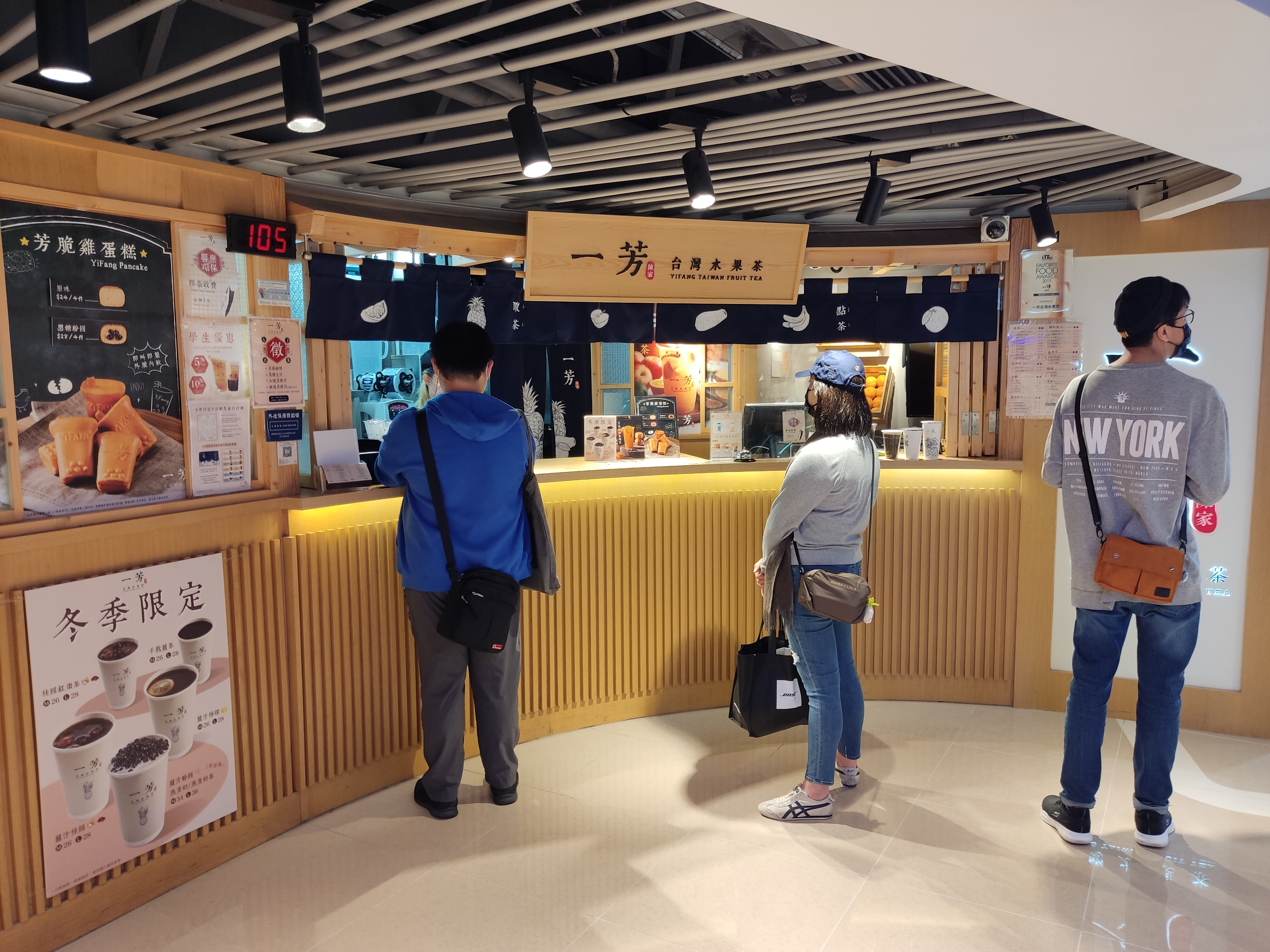
- Shop in Hong Kong
- Industry: Bubble tea
- Founded: 2016

Yifang Taiwan Fruit Tea is a Taiwanese chain of bubble tea shops. The business was established in 2016. As of 2024, there are approximately 1,000 locations. Inkism International is the parent company.

== Locations ==
Yifang is based in Taiwan and operates in more than a dozen countries. In Asia, the business has operated in Hong Kong.

=== North America ===
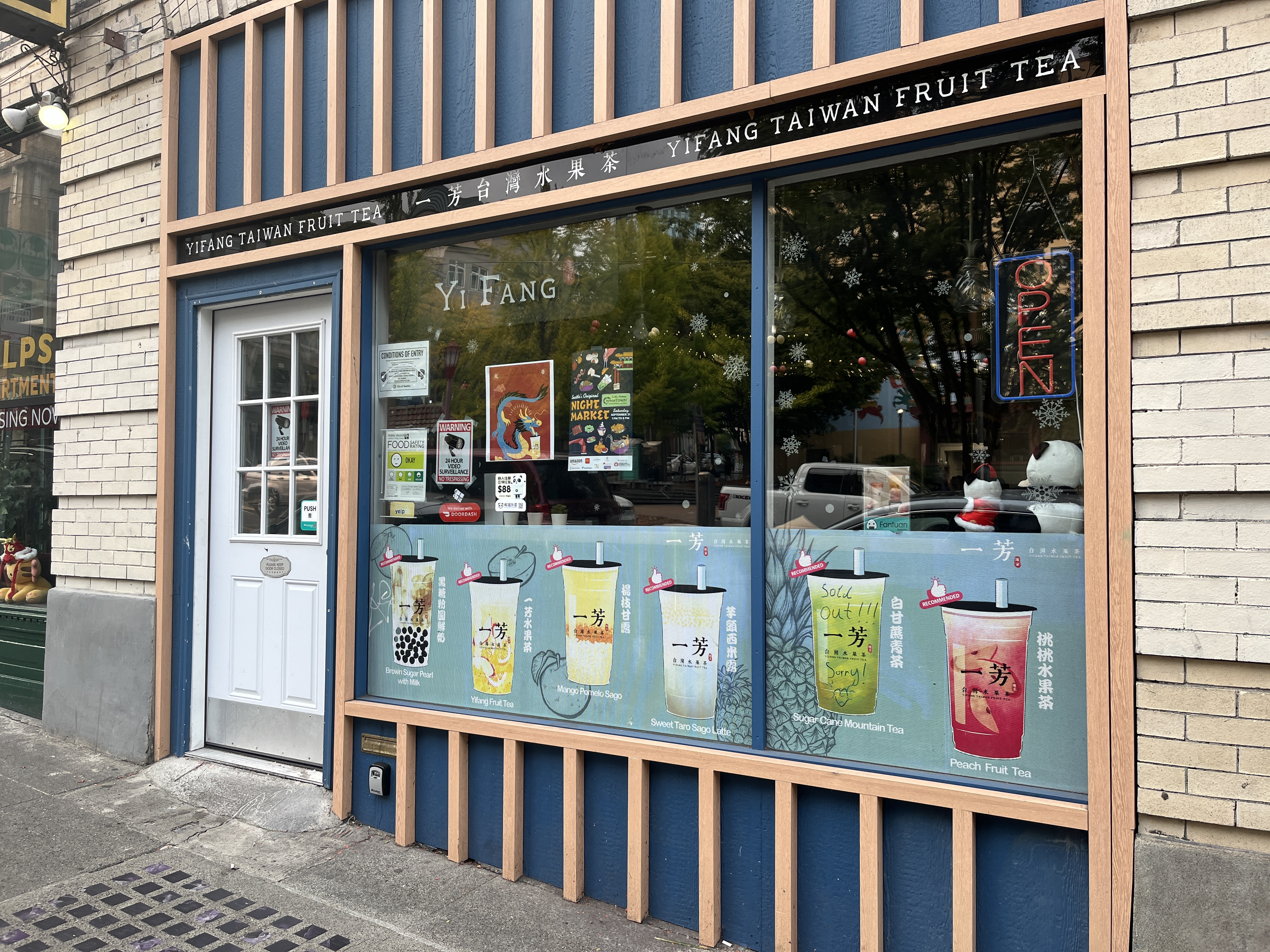
Shop in Seattle's Chinatown–International District, in 2024

The business has operated in British Columbia, Canada, including in Vancouver. In the United States, Yifang has operated in the following cities:

- Arcadia, California
- Elk Grove, California
- Honolulu, Hawaii
- Philadelphia, Pennsylvania
- Portland, Oregon
- San Francisco, California
- San Jose, California
- Seattle, Washington
