= Club Café =

Gay bar and restaurant in Boston, Massachusetts, U.S.

- Interactive map of Club Café

Restaurant information
- Established: 1983
- Owner: James Morgrage
- Previous owner: Frank Ribaudo
- Location: 209 Columbus Avenue, Boston, Massachusetts, United States
- Coordinates: 42.34839°N 71.07247°W
- Website: www.clubcafe.com

Club Café is a gay bar, restaurant and nightclub in Boston's Back Bay neighborhood, in the U.S. state of Massachusetts. The bar was established in 1983. Club Café is located in the historic Youth's Companion Building, also known as the Pledge of Allegiance Building, at 209 Columbus Avenue in Boston, Massachusetts. The building is listed on the National Register of Historic Places as the site where the Pledge of Allegiance was written and published.

== History ==
In 1983, after Ribaudo and friends were targeted for being gay at Back Bay Racquetball, they went on to open Metropolitan Health Club, a gay-friendly gym. In the mid-1980s, Ribaudo and Joseph McAllster “opened Club Café as a place where members could gather after workouts”.

Club Café was challenging to keep open in its first years due to discrimination against the gay community and the stigma of the HIV/AIDS crisis. Ribaudo stated that he was afraid of bankruptcy and didn’t make any profit in the first five years. During the AIDS crisis Ribaudo used the club “to host community dinners, meetings, and group discussions for people to learn from each other, seek support, and research the latest treatments”.

Ribaudo created a community support fund, donating all of Club Café’s money raised through coat checks and recycling to LGBTQIA sports leagues. According to the venue’s general manager, James Morgrage, Club Café donates $30,000 annually to sports leagues.

McAllaster, died in 1993 of complications from AIDS at age 38. In 2026, Ribaudo died at 81 after being diagnosed with glioblastoma two years prior.
