= The Alley (Oakland, California) =

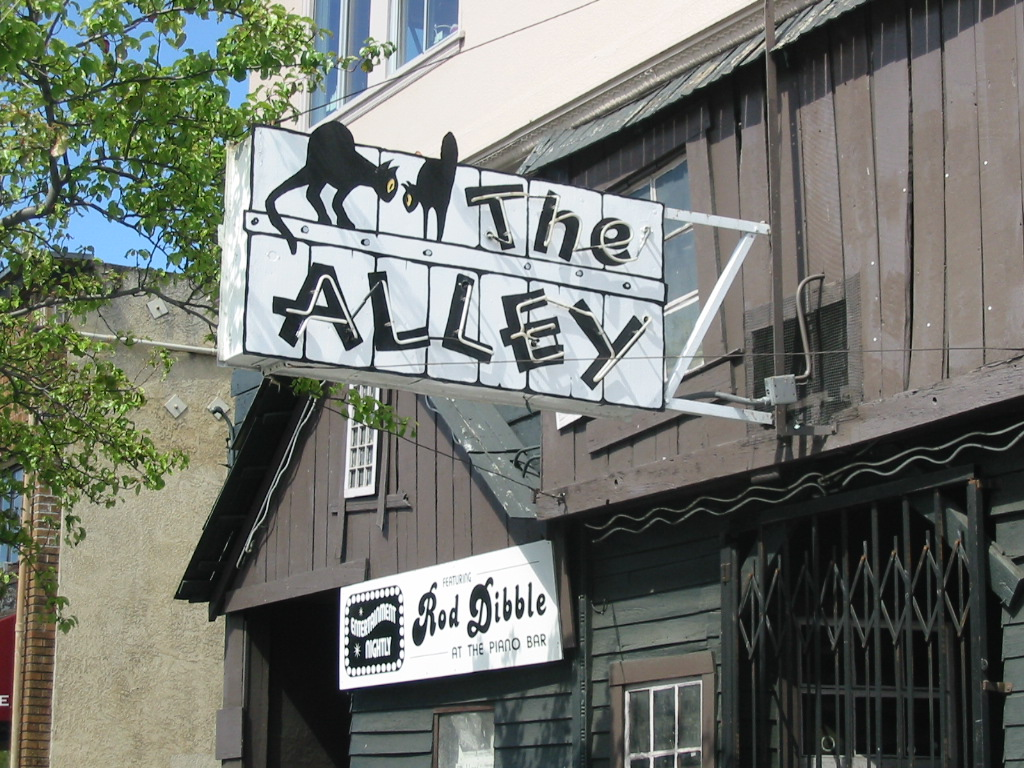
- The Alley piano bar in Oakland
- Interactive map of The Alley

Restaurant information
- Established: 1933
- Owner: Jackie Simpkins
- Food type: American
- Dress code: casual
- Location: 3325 Grand Avenue, Oakland, Alameda, California
- Coordinates: 37.813100°N 122.247130°W
- Other locations: none

The Alley is a restaurant and piano bar located in the Lake Merritt neighborhood of Oakland, California, in the United States. It is known for nightly singing by patrons who take the microphone accompanied by a live pianist, who also sometimes sings.

== History ==
The Alley is one of the last remaining Oakland piano bars. It was founded in 1933. Most of the previous piano bars closed more than thirty years ago. The bar looks like a saloon or 1920s alleyway with wood shingles and windows in the interior. Writer Kimberly Chun described the interior as being designed by "a drunken Walt Disney". It has booths throughout similar to those found at a diner. Approximately 40,000 to 50,000 business cards from visitors are stapled all over the walls. Business cards from Jerry Brown and Gregg Allman can be found. Dinner, which is served nightly, focuses on American cuisine such as steaks and burgers. A piano is located past the main bar, surrounded by a lacquered wood bar. Twelve seats sit around the piano and a pianist sits at the keyboard. Songbooks and microphones also rest on the bar. The pianist primarily plays songs from the Great American Songbook.

Jody Kerr owned the bar from the 1940s until her death in 1995. Kerr's relative Jackie Simpkins owns the bar today. When she became the owner she wanted to remove the business cards, but the regular bar guests protested. In order to keep in compliance with the fire code, the bar sprays the business cards with fire retardant. In 2010, an apartment next to The Alley caught on fire. The fire destroyed the apartment but did not spread to the bar.

== Musicians ==
=== Rod Dibble ===
Pianist and singer Rod Dibble performed nightly at the bar until his death in December 2017. Visitors to the bar could sing solos accompanied by Dibble. He started playing piano in 1938 when he was six years of age. He performed at The Alley for over fifty years starting in 1960. Dibble walked to practice ten miles every day. He often practiced at the Claremont Resort or the Berkeley Marina. When he practiced, he played in 10-minute increments and learned one new song a week. He knew more than 4,000 songs by heart and changed the key based on the participating singer. San Francisco Chronicle writer Peter Hartlaub describes Dibble's voice as a mix of "Louis Armstrong and Tom Waits on the raspy spectrum". He played a Baldwin piano. When a participating singer did exceptionally well Dibble rang a cowbell in their honor. When a participating singer made his or her debut singing at The Alley, Dibble rang a much smaller bell in honor of the singer being an "Alley Virgin" regardless of whether the singer did exceptionally well. In the 1980s, Dibble accepted a recurring request, providing "frontier-style" incidental piano accompaniment to the poem "The Shooting of Dan McGrew", recited by "Tex", a regular patron who said he was a Texas Ranger.

Dibble was married, had two children and four grandchildren. He lived in Berkeley. When asked if he would ever retire, Dibble stated "I'll never retire, I'll be very happy to die right behind this piano here".

=== Paul Hlebcar ===
Paul Hlebcar has played guitar while sitting at the Alley's piano since the early 2000's. He leads "guitar bar" at The Alley on Tuesdays and Wednesdays, and early dinner sets on Fridays and Saturdays. He covers many styles, from Mick Jagger to Sinatra, and songs he will play for singers range from the standards and the Beatles to contemporary pop by Radiohead and Sublime.

=== Jef Labes ===
Pianist Jef Labes has accompanied singers at The Alley since 2016. He plays on Mondays and Fridays. He is known for recordings with Van Morrison and Bonnie Raitt. He has released two solo albums and has been praised for his "rural-flavored piano licks" and "definite sense of drama".

=== Bryan Seet ===
Pianist Bryan Seet discovered The Alley in 2016 and began to lead piano bar on Rod Dibble's nights off. Seet's repertoire extends to contemporary pop music, but he maintains many of the rituals Rod Dibble instituted, particularly passing the microphone around the piano to take your turn, and ringing a 'virgin bell' to celebrate an Alley debut. During the COVID-19 pandemic, when The Alley was forced to shutter for 14 months and faced financial crisis and closure, Seet rallied a group of regulars who raised more than $100,000, ensuring that the bar reopened. Seet has described his work at the piano as "creating a sacred space, like a church where a congregation of regulars help hold that space together, and support each other and new singers".

== Reception ==
The Alley has been mentioned in travel and restaurant guides to Oakland and the San Francisco Bay Area. The book, GrassRoutes Travel Guide to Oakland: The Soul of the City Next Door, said of The Alley that it was "an old-time alternative to karaoke" and that it represented "Oakland at its friendliest". The bar attracted "a wacky mix of hams and crooners", said Lonely Planet, and there were no beers on draft but the mixed drinks were "strooooong". Rough Guides listed The Alley as a bar in 2003 then as a live music venue in 2011. A guide to dive bars in the San Francisco Bay Area listed The Alley among five of Oakland's best dive bars, the group including Smitty's, a local bar several doors up the street from The Alley.
