= Gasoline Alley, Alberta =

Gasoline Alley
- Business park
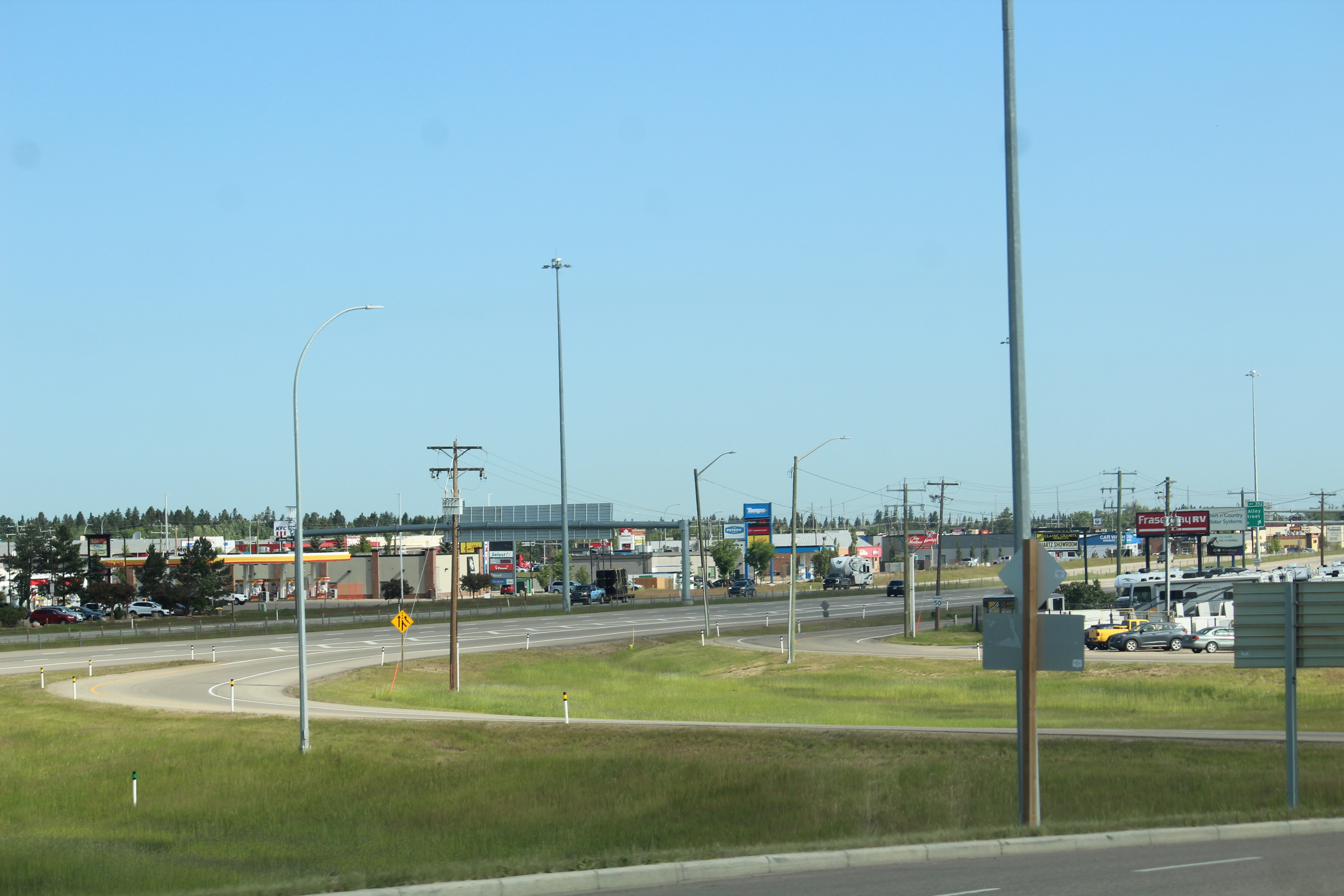
- Interactive map of Gasoline Alley
- Coordinates: 52°12′30″N 113°48′59″W
- Country: Canada
- Province: Alberta
- Rural municipality: Red Deer County
- Division: 2

Government
  - Mayor: Jim Wood
  - Administrative body: Red Deer County Council
  - Councillor: Jean Bota
- Time zone: UTC−06:00 (Alberta Time)
- Postal code span: T2E

Gasoline Alley, also known as the Gasoline Alley Business Park, is a business park in Red Deer County, Alberta, Canada, located immediately south of the City of Red Deer. The area is bound by Alberta Highway 2A to the west, Red Deer city limits the north, Range Road 272 to the east, and the south boundaries of quarter sections along Township Road 374 (McKenzie Road) to the south. It is bisected by Alberta Highway 2 (Queen Elizabeth II Highway), which has resulted in the area being divided into Gasoline Alley East and Gasoline Alley West.

== Description ==
Gasoline Alley is a predominantly commercial and light industrial area located along Alberta Highway 2 in Red Deer County. As of 2018, it also includes a residential community named Liberty Landing. Due to the area being divided by Highway 2, the area is referred to as Gasoline Alley East and Gasoline Alley West. Gasoline Alley South is used in reference to the area located west of Highway 2 and south of McKenzie Road which is characterized by warehouses and logistical companies.

The following various industrial and business parks form part of Gasoline Alley.

- Gasoline Alley East
  - Clearview Industrial Park
  - Energy Business Park
  - McKenzie Industrial Park
  - Petrolia Industrial Park
  - Piper Creek Business Park
- Gasoline Alley West
  - Hamlet of Gasoline Alley including the urban residential community of Liberty Landing

== History ==
Gasoline Alley began as a private rest area due to its location near Red Deer, midway between the cities of Calgary and Edmonton. Gas stations and restaurants were located along Highway 2 on service roads located just south of Red Deer city limits, with some business located on both sides of the highway to service northbound and southbound travellers respectively. In 1995, Alberta Transportation opened the McKenzie Road interchange, which allowed travellers from either direction of Highway 2 to better access both sides of Gasoline Alley. Around the same time, Red Deer County began expanding and developing Gasoline Alley to have more industrial and retail development, with Gasoline Alley West now having big box stores such as Costco and a movie theatre. In 2018, as part of the Highway 2/2A/Gaetz Avenue interchange reconstruction, the original service road to Gasoline Alley West was permanently closed and removed, with business access being moved to Leva Avenue, located on to the west of the highway-facing businesses.
