= Gasoline Alley, Alberta (hamlet) =

Gasoline Alley Gasoline Alley West / Liberty Landing
- Hamlet
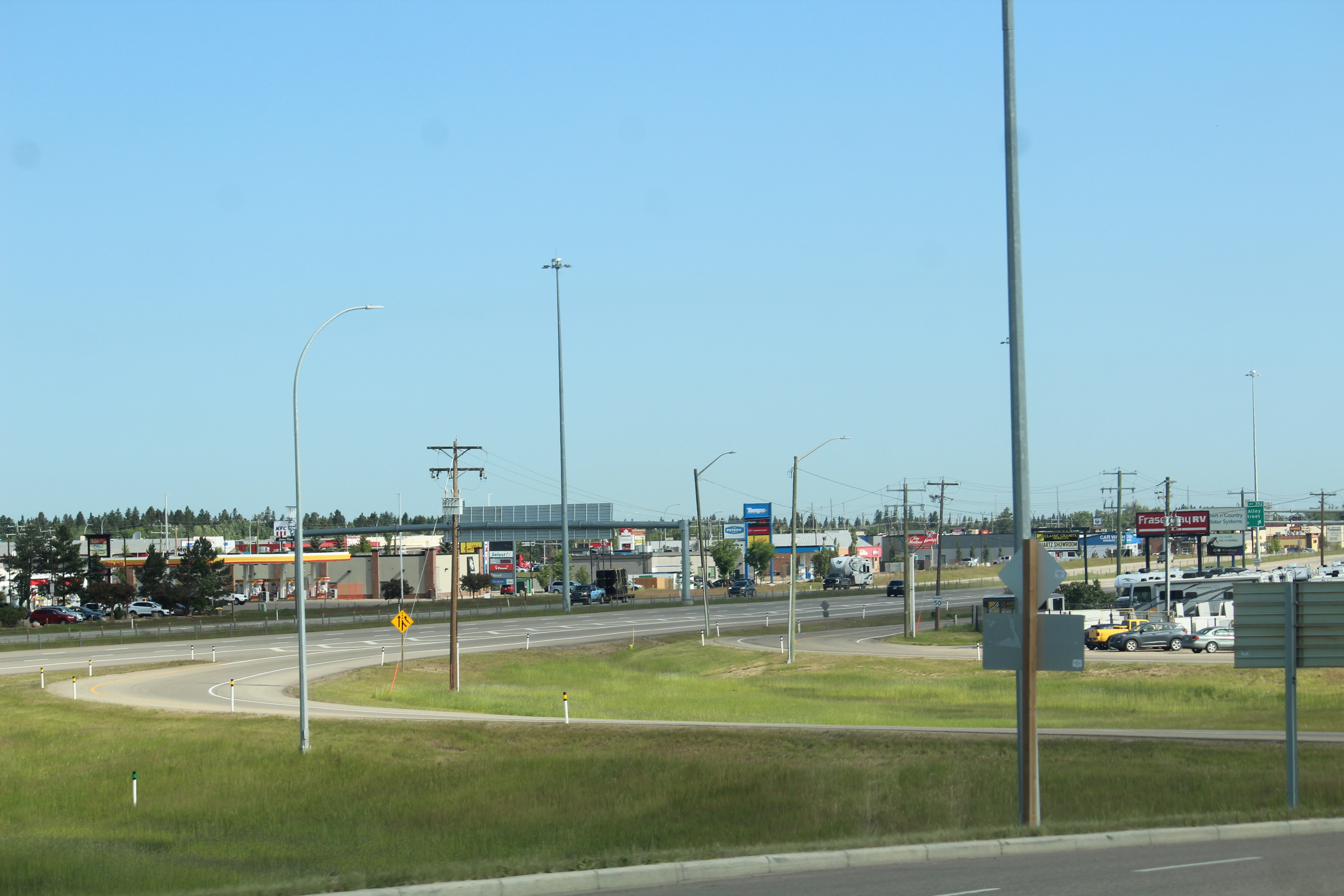

- Location of Gasoline Alley in Alberta
- Coordinates: 52.205°N 113.832°W
- Country: Canada
- Province: Alberta
- Census division: No. 8
- Municipal district: Red Deer County
- Designated: October 2, 2018

Government
  - Type: Unincorporated
  - Governing body: Red Deer County Council
- Time zone: UTC−06:00 (Alberta Time)
- Area code: +1-403

Gasoline Alley or Gasoline Alley West is a hamlet in the Canadian province of Alberta within Red Deer County. It is within the west portion of Gasoline Alley between Highway 2 and Highway 2A, 7 km (4.3 mi) south of downtown Red Deer.

== History ==
Red Deer County Council adopted the Liberty Landing Outline Plan in April 2015 for 46 ha (110 acres) of land on the north side of McKenzie Road between Highway 2 and Highway 2A in west portion of Gasoline Alley. With an estimated population of 2,349 living within 890 dwelling units at full build-out, Liberty Landing began developing in the west portion of Gasoline Alley in 2017. Show homes began marketing the residential community in September 2018. Due to high development fees associated with utility connections in the area, Red Deer County decided to designate the west portion of Gasoline Alley as a hamlet in order to facilitate franchise agreements that would reduce development fees. Red Deer County officially designated Gasoline Alley, inclusive of Liberty Landing, as a hamlet on October 2, 2018.

== Geography ==
Gasoline Alley's hamlet boundary comprises Highway 2 to the east, Township Road 374 (McKenzie Road) to the south, Range Road 275 to the west, and Waskasoo Avenue/Leva Avenue to the northwest.
