= The Alley Bar =

Gay bar in Boston, Massachusetts, U.S.

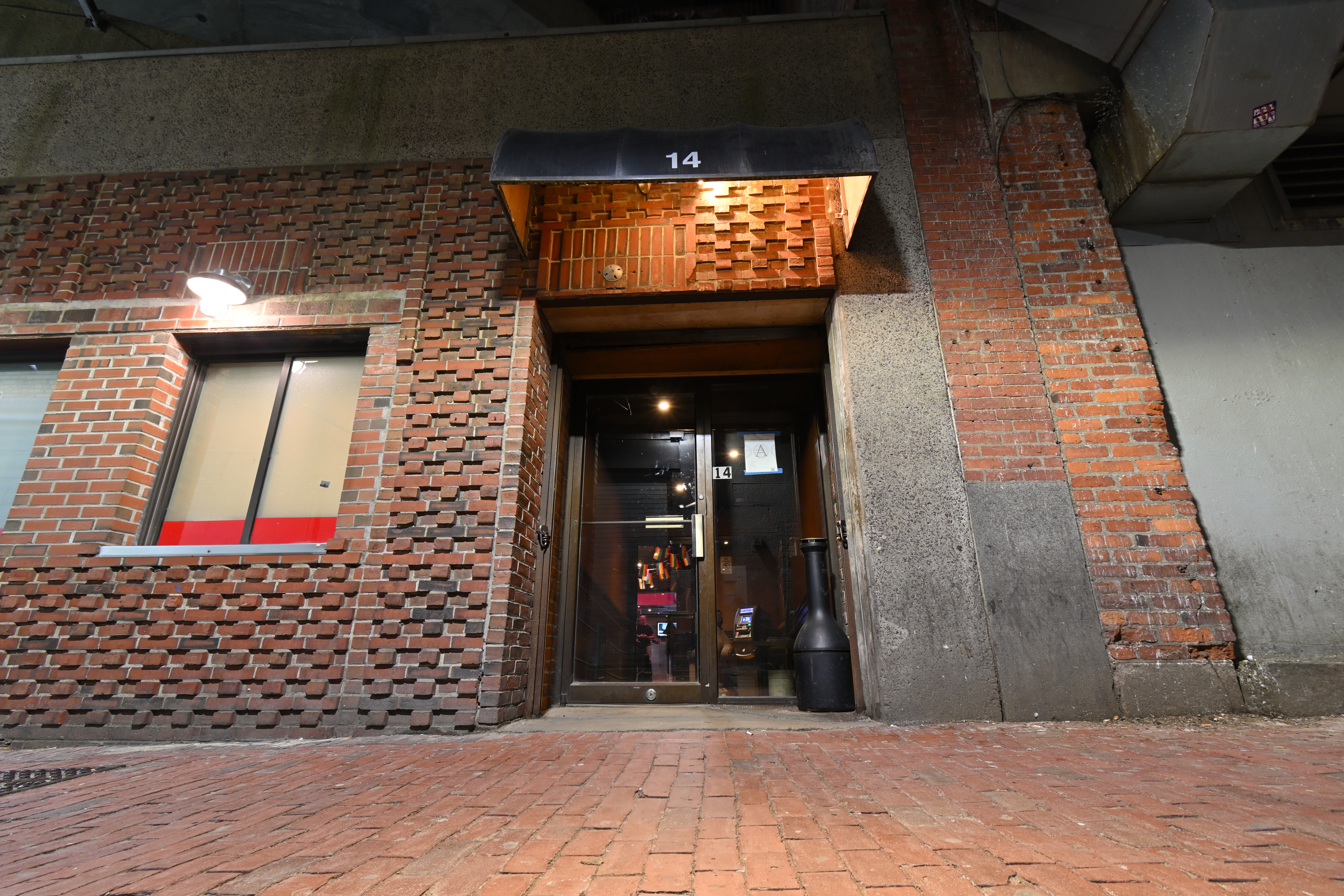
- The entrance to the bar on Pi Alley
- Interactive map of The Alley Bar

Restaurant information
- Location: Boston, Massachusetts, United States
- Coordinates: 42.3581°N 71.0587°W

The Alley Bar (also known as Alley Bar and The Alley) is a gay bar in Boston, in the U.S. state of Massachusetts.

== Description and reception ==
The "unabashedly queer" bar hosts regular parties such as Casual Fridays and Fuzz, as well as disc jockeys playing music ranging from Top 40 to "artsy" indie pop. Boston magazine says, "You won't find interloping bachelorette parties at this veteran watering hole, secreted away downtown. What you will find are refreshing vestiges of a time before gay bars got gentrified: cheap drinks, little pretense, and dancing throngs—not to mention an abundance of pheromones".

In 2018, Dana Hatic of Eater Boston said the Alley "is known as a flannel-filled 'den of Boston bears'" and said Fuzz has DJ Brent Covington and DJ Taffy playing "a mix of pop, rock, and dance music of all eras, plus some British pop and punk". The Alley was named Best Gay Bar by Boston magazine in 2019.

In a 2021 list of Boston's best gay bars, Jillian Dara and Linda Laban of Time Out Boston wrote: "Nestled inside Downtown Crossing, near what is unofficially Boston's wild weekend drinking district, this long-standing, bear-centric, leather bar offers dance, karaoke and trivia nights, as well as pool tables in a casual, sports bar-like atmosphere. The entrance is a little off the beaten path, but the name is a staple among the LGBTQ community, so once you're there, you'll know that you've arrived at the right spot. The bi-level space is constantly a buzz, packing in the crowds that always accumulate on weekends (and, when in season, the weekly communal RuPaul’s Drag Race viewing parties)."

Meaghan Agnew and Jillian Hammell included the Alley in Thrillist's 2021 list of "The Best LGBTQ+ Bars and Parties in Boston", writing: "Give yourself extra time to get there, because The Alley's clandestine location requires significant sleuthing. But once you've discovered the hidden den, you've found your fellow bears. This is the place for weeknight trivia, late night beers (it closes at 2 am every night), and barely clothed dance parties. The once-grubby bathrooms got an upgrade a few years back, however the cash-only bar transactions remain."
