= The Alley (company) =

Taiwan-based bubble tea brand

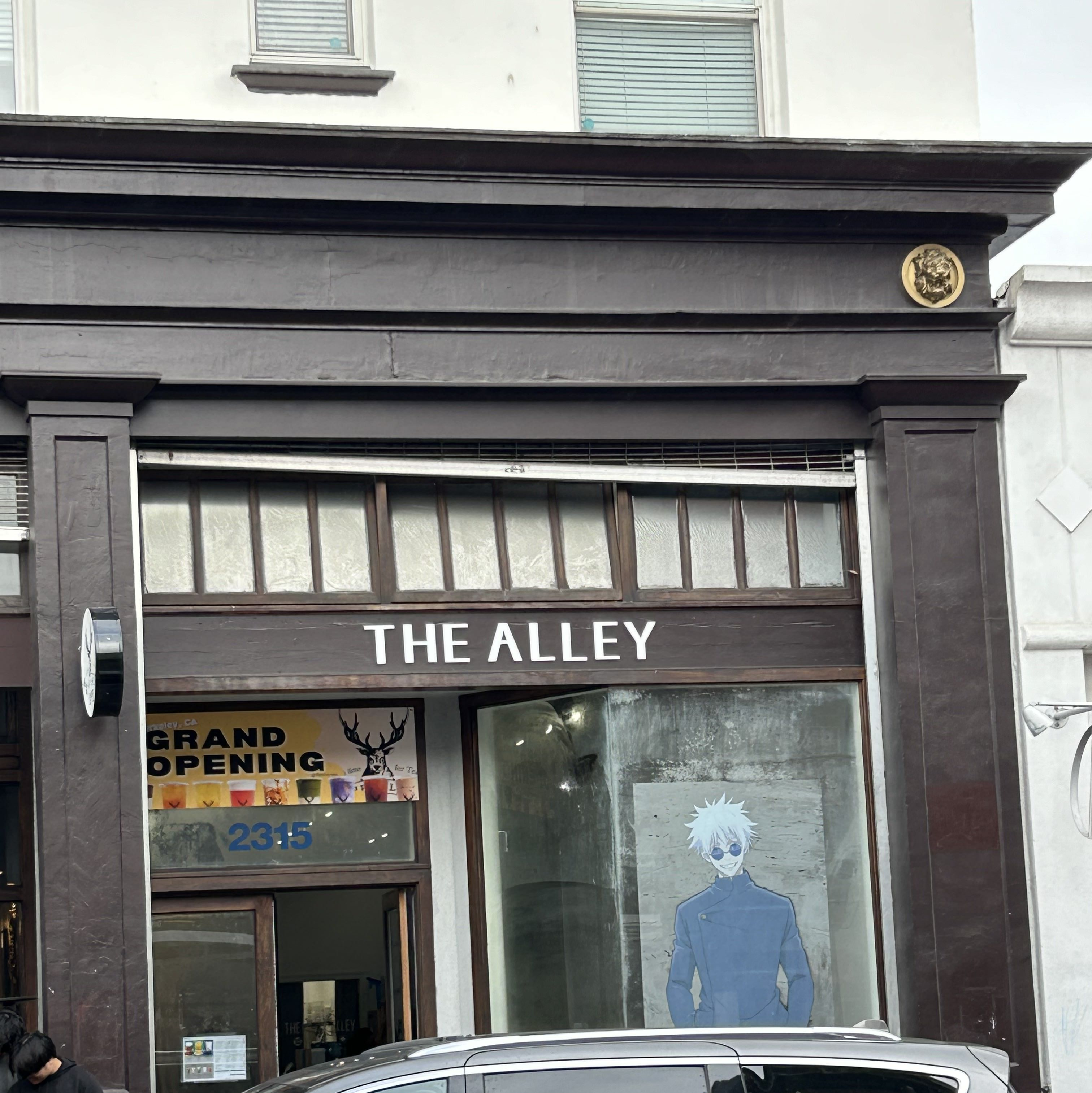
- Exterior of a location in Berkeley, California, in 2024

Restaurant information
- Established: 2015
- Website: the-alley.us

The Alley is a chain of bubble tea shops. The business was started by Taiwanese graphic designer Mao-ting Chiu in 2015. As of 2024, there are approximately 450 locations in 18 countries.

The company's logo depicts a deer.

== Locations ==
=== Asia ===
The Alley is based in Taiwan. Elsewhere in Asia, the business has also operated in Japan, Malaysia, Singapore, South Korea, and Thailand. There have been locations in Manila, Philippines. The Alley was among the three most popular bubble tea brands in China in 2019.

=== Europe ===
In Europe, The Alley has operated in France, as well as London, United Kingdom.

=== North America ===
In Canada, the business has operated in Calgary, Edmonton, Mississauga, Montreal, Toronto, and Vancouver.

In the United States, The Alley has operated in the following cities:

- Berkeley, California
- Cedar Park, Texas
- Dallas, Texas
- Honolulu, Hawaii
- Houston, Texas
- Irvine, California
- New York City
- San Diego, California

== Reception ==
Tasting Table ranked The Alley fifth in a 2022 list of the best bubble tea brands. Eat This, Not That included the business in a 2024 list of the ten best bubble tea chains.

== See also ==
- List of restaurant chains
