= Telford and Wrekin Council elections =

Local government elections in Shropshire, England

Telford and Wrekin Council elections are held every four years. Telford and Wrekin Council is the local authority for the unitary authority of Telford and Wrekin in the ceremonial county of Shropshire, England. Until 1 April 1998 it was a non-metropolitan district. Since the last boundary changes in 2023, 54 councillors have been elected from 32 wards.

== Council elections ==
- 1973 Wrekin District Council election
- 1976 The Wrekin District Council election
- 1979 The Wrekin District Council election (New ward boundaries)
- 1983 The Wrekin District Council election
- 1987 The Wrekin District Council election (District boundary changes took place but the number of seats remained the same)
- 1991 The Wrekin District Council election
- 1995 The Wrekin District Council election
- 1997 Telford and Wrekin Council election (New ward boundaries)
- 2000 Telford and Wrekin Council election
- 2003 Telford and Wrekin Council election (New ward boundaries)
- 2007 Telford and Wrekin Council election
- 2011 Telford and Wrekin Council election
- 2015 Telford and Wrekin Council election (New ward boundaries)
- 2019 Telford and Wrekin Council election
- 2023 Telford and Wrekin Council election (New ward boundaries)

== Results maps ==
2003 results map

2007 results map

2011 results map

2015 results map

2019 results map

2023 results map

== By-election results ==
By-elections for individual seats can occur during a council's four-year term, for instance when a councillor dies or resigns their seat.

=== 1997–2000 ===
College By-Election 21 October 1999
Party	Candidate	Votes	%	±%
Conservative		370	52.0	+16.0
Labour		342	48.0	+0.2
Majority		28	4.0	
Turnout		712	31.0	
Conservative gain from Labour		Swing	+7.9	

=== 2000–2003 ===
Malinslee and Langley By-Election 7 December 2000
Party	Candidate	Votes	%	±%
Labour		443	56.4	
Conservative		176	22.4	
Liberal Democrats		167	21.2	
Majority		267	34.0	
Turnout		786	13.4	
Labour hold		Swing		

Dawley Magna By-Election 7 June 2001
Party	Candidate	Votes	%	±%
Labour		1,826	49.6	+16.2
Conservative		1,083	29.4	−11.9
Liberal Democrats		597	16.2	+16.2
Socialist Alliance		178	4.8	+4.8
Majority		743	20.2	
Turnout		3,684		
Labour hold		Swing	+14.4	

Malinslee and Langley By-Election 25 October 2001
Party	Candidate	Votes	%	±%
Labour		421	53.4	
Liberal Democrats		257	32.6	
UKIP		77	9.8	
Socialist Alliance		34	4.3	
Majority		164	20.8	
Turnout		789	13.5	
Labour hold		Swing		

Wombridge By-Election 25 October 2001
Party	Candidate	Votes	%	±%
Labour		257	47.8	−17.6
Conservative		158	29.4	−5.2
UKIP		80	14.9	+14.9
Liberal Democrats		43	8.0	+8.0
Majority		99	18.4	
Turnout		538	12.4	
Labour hold		Swing	-6.2	

Donnington By-Election 14 February 2002
Party	Candidate	Votes	%	±%
Labour		462	63.1	+4.2
Conservative		243	33.2	−7.9
Liberal Democrats		27	3.7	+3.7
Majority		219	29.9	
Turnout		732	20.6	
Labour hold		Swing	+6.1	

=== 2003–2007 ===
The Nedge By-Election 31 July 2003
Party	Candidate	Votes	%	±%
Labour		763	32.3	−7.0
Independent		701	29.7	−2.9
Conservative		666	28.2	+0.1
Independent		174	7.4	+7.4
Independent		57	2.4	+2.4
Majority		62	2.6	
Turnout		2,361	36.0	
Labour hold		Swing	+2.1	

Ketley and Oakengates By-Election 18 September 2003
Party	Candidate	Votes	%	±%
Conservative		1,225	42.1	+12.9
Labour		1,183	40.6	−4.3
Independent		350	12.0	+12.0
Independent		153	5.3	+5.3
Majority		42	1.5	
Turnout		2,911	43.3	
Conservative hold		Swing	+8.6	

Haygate By-Election 12 February 2004
Party	Candidate	Votes	%	±%
Conservative	Rosemary Chaplin	374	33.8	−16.3
Labour	Frank Burns	342	30.9	−2.3
Liberal Democrats	Sean Blackhurst	173	15.6	+15.6
Independent	Roger Aveley	152	13.7	−3.0
Independent	Barry Olliver	65	5.9	+5.9
Majority		32	2.9	
Turnout		1,106	54.1	
Conservative hold		Swing	-7.0	

Newport North By-Election 12 February 2004
Party	Candidate	Votes	%	±%
Conservative	Daniel Ashley	500	40.0	+7.9
Liberal Democrats	Robert Unwin	441	35.3	−32.6
Independent	Susan Harris-Cohen	158	12.7	+12.7
Labour	James Roberts	150	12.0	+12.0
Majority		59	4.7	
Turnout		1,249	56.6	
Conservative gain from Liberal Democrats		Swing	+20.3	

Madeley By-Election 22 April 2004
Party	Candidate	Votes	%	±%
Labour	Janice Jones	421	29.1	−10.5
Independent	John Birtwhistle	387	26.7	−8.2
Conservative	Pamela Wilkie	311	21.5	−4.0
BNP	Brian Coleman	188	13.0	+13.0
Liberal Democrats	Patricia King	105	7.2	+7.2
UKIP	Raymond Knight	36	2.5	+2.5
Majority		34	2.4	
Turnout		1,448	35.1	
Labour hold		Swing	+1.2	

Dawley Magna By-Election 7 December 2006
Party	Candidate	Votes	%	±%
Telford and Wrekin Peoples Association	Adrian Williams	649	41.3	+41.3
Labour	Santokho Sekham	476	30.3	−24.9
Conservative	Harvey Unwin	446	28.4	−3.4
Majority		173	11.0	
Turnout		1,571	22.5	
Independent gain from Labour		Swing	+33.1	

=== 2007–2011 ===
Brookside By-Election 8 November 2007
Party	Candidate	Votes	%	±%
Conservative	John Dixon	593	52.0	+21.7
Labour	Liz Swift	362	31.7	+3.2
Independent	Sudhir Patel	114	10.0	−1.5
Independent	John Franklyn	72	6.3	+6.3
Majority		231	20.3	
Turnout		1,141	22.5	
Conservative gain from Labour		Swing	+9.3	

Horsehay and Lightmoor By-Election 13 February 2008
Party	Candidate	Votes	%	±%
Conservative	Clive Mollett	358	45.6	+6.8
Labour	Steve Harrington	172	21.9	+1.6
Telford and Wrekin People's Association	John Higginson	145	18.5	+18.5
Independent	Alan Hussey	110	14.0	−26.9
Majority		186	23.7	
Turnout		785	33.4	
Conservative gain from Independent		Swing	+2.6	

Wrockwardine By-Election 13 February 2008
Party	Candidate	Votes	%	±%
Conservative	Terry Kiernan	918	67.3	+15.3
Liberal Democrats	Patricia Fairclough	306	22.4	+22.4
Labour	Thomas Bolger	141	10.3	−5.9
Majority		612	44.9	
Turnout		1,365	32.7	
Conservative hold		Swing	-3.6	

Muxton By-Election 24 July 2008
Party	Candidate	Votes	%	±%
Conservative	Nigel Dugmore	795	61.9	+2.4
Labour	Philip Norton	341	26.6	+1.0
Independent	Graham Williamson	100	7.8	+7.8
UKIP	Raymond Knight	48	3.7	−11.2
Majority		454	35.3	
Turnout		1,284	27.2	
Conservative hold		Swing	+0.7	

College By-Election 11 February 2010
Party	Candidate	Votes	%	±%
Conservative	David Chaplin	252	29.3	−5.5
Independent	Patrick McCarthy	237	27.6	
Labour	Michael Ion	219	25.5	+25.5
Independent	Nusrat Janjua	127	14.8	
Telford and Wrekin People's Association	Richard Choudhary	24	2.8	
Majority		15	1.7	
Turnout		859	39.7	
Conservative gain from Independent		Swing		

The Nedge By-Election 11 February 2010
Party	Candidate	Votes	%	±%
Conservative	Harvey Unwin	760	42.5	+18.6
Labour	Shaun Davies	688	38.5	+15.4
UKIP	Ray Knight	237	13.3	−0.6
BNP	Terence Gould	103	5.8	+5.8
Majority		72	4.0	
Turnout		1,788	27.2	
Conservative gain from Labour		Swing	+1.6	

=== 2011–2015 ===
Dawley Magna By-Election 14 February 2013
Party	Candidate	Votes	%	±%
Labour	Jane Pinter	957	53.9	+11.6
Conservative	Alan Scott	379	21.4	−8.1
UKIP	Ryan Laing	312	17.6	+17.6
Independent	Angela Jordan	126	7.1	+7.1
Majority		578	32.5	
Turnout		1,774	24.5	
Labour hold		Swing	+9.9	

=== 2015–2019 ===
Horsehay and Lightmoor By-Election 8 December 2016
Party	Candidate	Votes	%	±%
Labour	Rajash Mehta	358	46.3	+22.2
Conservative	Robert Cadman	292	37.7	−5.0
UKIP	Denis Allen	124	16.0	−1.8
Majority		66	8.6	
Turnout		774		
Labour gain from Conservative		Swing		

=== 2019–2023 ===
Dawley and Aqueduct By-Election 6 May 2021
Party	Candidate	Votes	%	±%
Labour	Ian Preece	1,310	50.9	−10.9
Conservative	Kate Barnes	1,192	46.3	+8.1
Liberal Democrats	Denis Allen	72	2.8	+2.8
Majority		118	4.6	
Turnout		2,574		
Labour hold		Swing		

Donnington By-Election 6 May 2021
Party	Candidate	Votes	%	±%
Conservative	Jay Gough	851	54.0	+29.0
Labour	Sophie Thompson	658	41.8	−10.7
Liberal Democrats	David Ellams	66	4.2	+4.2
Majority		193	12.3	
Turnout		1,575		
Conservative gain from Labour		Swing		

Dawley and Aqueduct By-Election 16 December 2021
Party	Candidate	Votes	%	±%
Labour	Bob Wennington	996	55.8	−6.0
Conservative	Kate Barnes	735	41.2	+3.0
Liberal Democrats	Catherine Salter	55	3.1	+3.1
Majority		261	14.6	
Turnout		1,786		
Labour hold		Swing		

Brookside By-Election 7 April 2022
Party	Candidate	Votes	%	±%
Labour	Jim Loveridge	531	58.8	+20.0
Conservative	Chris Leach	318	35.2	+11.7
Liberal Democrats	Paul Howard	54	6.0	−11.6
Majority		213	23.6	
Turnout		903		
Labour hold		Swing		

=== 2023–2027 ===
The Nedge By-Election 6 June 2024
Party	Candidate	Votes	%	±%
Labour	Corrine Chikadamina	971	54.4	
Conservative	Richard Tyrrell	464	26.0	
Liberal Democrats	Paul Bryant	175	9.8	
Independent	Sophia Vaughan-Hodkinson	175	9.8	
Majority		507	28.4	
Turnout		1,785		
Labour hold		Swing		

Hadley and Leegomery By-Election 14 November 2024
Party	Candidate	Votes	%	±%
Labour	Julie Kaur	778	45.3	
Conservative	Stuart Parr	539	31.4	
Reform	Robert Leah	274	15.9	
Green	Mark Webster	75	4.4	
Liberal Democrats	Tarlochan Singh Aujla	53	3.1	
Majority		239	13.9	
Turnout		1,719		
Labour hold		Swing		

The Nedge By-Election 14 November 2024
Party	Candidate	Votes	%	±%
Labour	Nathalie Page	636	33.8	
Conservative	Tom Wust	620	33.0	
Reform	Greg Sinclair	427	22.7	
Green	John Adams	84	4.5	
Independent	Sophia Vaughan-Hodkinson	61	3.2	
Liberal Democrats	Milan Thakur	53	2.8	
Majority		16	0.9	
Turnout		1,881		
Labour hold		Swing		

Malinslee and Dawley Bank By-Election 2 July 2026
Party	Candidate	Votes	%	±%
Labour	Ben Carter	590	42.9	
Reform	Doug Halsall	569	41.4	
Conservative	Thomas Hoof	104	7.6	
Green	Jazz Holmes	76	5.5	
Liberal Democrats	Patrick Doddy	35	2.5	
Majority		21	1.5	
Turnout		1,374		
Labour hold		Swing		
