= 2015 Telford and Wrekin Council election =

2015 UK local government election

← 2011	7 May 2015	2019 →
Party	Conservative	Liberal Democrats	Labour
- Results of the 2015 Telford and Wrekin Council election

The 2015 Telford and Wrekin Council election took place on 7 May 2015 to elect members of the Telford and Wrekin Council in England. It was held on the same day as other local elections and the UK General Election 2015.

== Election result ==
The Labour Party lost overall control, but remained the largest party on the council.

Telford and Wrekin Election Result 2015
Party	Seats	Gains	Losses	Net gain/loss	Seats %	Votes %	Votes	+/−
Labour	27	0	-6	-6	50.0	32.1	26,603	
Conservative	23	7	-1	+6	43.0	37.1	30,730	
Liberal Democrats	3	0	0	0	5.0	3.2	2,667	
Independent	1	1	-1	0	2.0	5.8	4,815	

== Ward results ==
Sitting councillors are marked with an asterisk (*).

=== Adamston & Bratton ===
Adamston & Bratton
Party	Candidate	Votes	%	±%
Conservative	Terry Kiernan *	822	50.3	
Labour	Cindy Mason-Morris	310	19.0	
UKIP	Adrian Williams	305	18.7	
Liberal Democrats	Josh Tomlinson	198	12.1	
Majority		512	31.3	
Turnout		1,642	73.07	
Registered electors		2,247		
Conservative win (new seat)				

=== Apley Castle ===
Apley Castle
Party	Candidate	Votes	%	±%
Liberal Democrats	Karen Tracy Blundell *	714	40.2	–12.1
Conservative	Tony Bentley	494	27.8	–2.6
Labour	Faith Margaret Sloan	353	19.9	+2.5
UKIP	Andrew Benion	315	17.7	N/A
Majority		220	12.4	
Turnout		1,795	73.11	+21.70
Registered electors		2,455		
Liberal Democrats hold		Swing		

=== Arleston ===
Arleston
Party	Candidate	Votes	%	±%
Labour	Angela Diane McClements *	729	55.1	–13.2
Conservative	Dorothy Roberts	324	24.5	–7.2
UKIP	Barry Olliver	271	20.5	N/A
Majority		405	30.6	–6.1
Turnout		1,334	57.70	+16.44
Registered electors		2,312		
Labour hold		Swing		

=== Brookside ===
Brookside (2 seats)
Party	Candidate	Votes	%	±%
Labour	Arnold Richard Hugh England *	931	39.1	–7.4
Labour	Jackie Loveridge *	869	–	
Conservative	Mike Wilson	660	27.7	–7.5
Conservative	Ishbel Anne Lapper	631	–	
UKIP	Lynda Hogger	591	24.8	+6.5
UKIP	Stuart Parr	453	–	
Green	Jacob Jerry Long	164	6.9	N/A
Turnout		2,410	55.71	+21.96
Registered electors		4,326		
Labour hold		Swing		
Labour hold		Swing		

=== Church Aston & Lilleshall ===
Church Aston & Lilleshall
Party	Candidate	Votes	%	±%
Conservative	Andrew John Eade *	1,306	73.2	–5.7
Green	Peter Robert Hawkins	250	14.0	N/A
Labour	Derek Gorse	230	12.9	–8.2
Majority		1,056	59.2	+1.5
Turnout		1,806	76.11	+22.23
Registered electors		2,373		
Conservative hold		Swing		

=== College ===
College
Party	Candidate	Votes	%	±%
Labour	Lee Daniel Carter	665	43.2	+6.0
Conservative	Sherrel Fikeis	474	30.8	+1.0
Independent	Pat McCarthy	396	25.7	–7.3
Majority		191	12.4	+8.2
Turnout		1,569	66.54	+17.22
Registered electors		2,358		
Labour hold		Swing		

=== Dawley & Aqueduct ===
Dawley & Aqueduct (3 seats)
Party	Candidate	Votes	%	±%
Labour	Jane Ann Pinter	1,820	43.1	
Labour	Andrew John Burford	1,630	–	
Conservative	Steve Barnes	1,609	38.1	
Labour	Charlie Tranter	1,492	–	
Conservative	Stefan Heighway	1,232	–	
UKIP	Adam Edwards	1,168	27.7	
Conservative	Greg Sinclair	1,099	–	
Turnout		4,269	60.43	
Registered electors		7,064		
Labour win (new seat)				
Labour win (new seat)				
Conservative win (new seat)				

=== Donnington ===
Donnington (2 seats)
Party	Candidate	Votes	%	±%
Labour	Elizabeth Ann Clare *	951	37.3	–24.2
Labour	Clive Neil Mason *	868	–	
UKIP	Callam Delaney	834	32.7	N/A
Conservative	Martyn Benjamin Edwards	797	31.3	+3.2
Conservative	Andy Chaplin	679	–	
Green	Joanna Summers	245	9.6	N/A
Turnout		2,561	52.99	+18.36
Registered electors		4,833		
Labour hold		Swing		
Labour hold		Swing		

=== Dothill ===
Dothill
Party	Candidate	Votes	%	±%
Liberal Democrats	Karen Lesley Tomlinson *	453	29.4	–12.0
Conservative	Emma Thomas	427	27.7	–4.2
UKIP	Denis Allen	363	23.6	N/A
Labour	Simon Malpass	296	19.2	–7.5
Majority		26	1.7	–7.8
Turnout		1,557	70.58	+20.53
Registered electors		2,206		
Liberal Democrats hold		Swing		

=== Edgmond & Ercall Magna ===
Edgmond & Ercall Magna (2 seats)
Party	Candidate	Votes	%	±%
Conservative	Stephen Peter Burrell *	1,882	53.9	
Conservative	Stephen Bentley *	1,774	–	
UKIP	Jill Seymour	830	23.8	
Labour	Christine Gillian Lord	695	19.9	
Green	Ian Christopher Turner	472	13.5	
Turnout		3,519	76.10	
Registered electors		4,624		
Conservative win (new seat)				
Conservative win (new seat)				

=== Ercall ===
Ercall
Party	Candidate	Votes	%	±%
Conservative	Miles Bewick Hosken *	936	54.5	–7.6
Labour	Ralph Edward Perkins	493	28.7	–9.2
UKIP	Tim Wills	316	18.4	N/A
Majority		443	25.8	+1.5
Turnout		1,763	75.02	+19.21
Registered electors		2,350		
Conservative hold		Swing		

=== Hadley & Leegomery ===
Hadley & Leegomery (3 seats)
Party	Candidate	Votes	%	±%
Labour	Leon Albert Murray *	1,971	50.6	+1.6
Labour	Malcolm John Smith *	1,872	–	
Labour	Rob Sloan *	1,695	–	
Conservative	Phil Morris-Jones	1,266	32.5	–1.3
Conservative	Sylvia Hall	1,194	–	
Conservative	Edward Charles Hugh Thomas	1,010	–	
Green	Susan Taylor	611	15.7	N/A
Turnout		3,963	56.27	+20.05
Registered electors		7,043		
Labour hold		Swing		
Labour hold		Swing		
Labour hold		Swing		

=== Haygate ===
Haygate
Party	Candidate	Votes	%	±%
Labour	Graham Henry Cook	572	39.8	–16.4
Conservative	John Robert Alvey	562	39.1	–4.7
UKIP	Patrick Smith	226	15.7	N/A
Independent	Kevin John Tanner	76	5.3	N/A
Majority		10	0.7	–11.7
Turnout		1,452	60.47	+17.18
Registered electors		2,401		
Labour hold		Swing		

=== Horsehay & Lightmoor ===
Horsehay & Lightmoor (2 seats)
Party	Candidate	Votes	%	±%
Conservative	Elizabeth Jayne Greenaway *	1,280	46.2	+2.2
Conservative	Clive Paul Richard Mollett *	950	–	
Labour	Mike Phillips	722	26.0	–15.3
Labour	Cathy Salter	661	–	
UKIP	Angela Roberts	534	19.3	N/A
UKIP	Peter Roberts	498	–	
Liberal Democrats	Martyn John Jobe	221	8.0	N/A
Green	Lee Jonathan Proudfoot	193	7.0	N/A
Libertarian	Simon John Walmsley	45	1.6	N/A
Turnout		2,787	67.30	+25.72
Registered electors		4,141		
Conservative hold		Swing		
Conservative hold		Swing		

=== Ironbridge ===
Ironbridge
Party	Candidate	Votes	%	±%
Conservative	Nic Lowery	675	38.0	
Labour	Ken Stringer	610	34.3	
UKIP	Richard Buckworth-Herne-Soame	281	15.8	
Green	Catherine Edwards	210	11.8	
Majority		65	3.7	
Turnout		1,803	71.80	
Registered electors		2,511		
Conservative win (new seat)				

=== Ketley & Oakengates ===
Ketley & Oakengates (3 seats)
Party	Candidate	Votes	%	±%
Conservative	Joy Annice Francis	1,463	35.9	+0.3
Conservative	Mark Boylan	1,321	–	
Conservative	John Ashford	1,306	–	
Labour	Amrik Singh Jhawar *	1,202	29.5	–21.8
Labour	Ranbir Kaur Sahota	1,149	–	
Labour	Derek Robert William White *	1,103	–	
UKIP	Bill Gilmour	959	23.5	N/A
UKIP	Andy Morris	824	–	
Green	Nathan John Parton	448	11.0	N/A
Turnout		4,137	58.71	+17.85
Registered electors		7,047		
Conservative gain from Labour		Swing		
Conservative gain from Labour		Swing		
Conservative gain from Labour		Swing		

=== Madeley & Sutton Hill ===
Madeley & Sutton Hill (3 seats)
Party	Candidate	Votes	%	±%
Conservative	Dave Wright	1,667	36.2	
Labour	Paul Robert Watling *	1,638	35.5	
Labour	Janice Jones	1,551	–	
Labour	Alan Arthur Mackenzie *	1,504	–	
Conservative	Graham Hossell	1,408	–	
UKIP	Avon Horden	1,240	26.9	
Conservative	Rodney Stephen Pitt	969	–	
Independent	Gillian Mary Green *	891	19.3	
Green	Thomas David Keane	516	11.2	
Turnout		4,629	61.14	
Registered electors		7,571		
Conservative win (new seat)				
Labour win (new seat)				
Labour win (new seat)				

=== Malinslee & Dawley Bank ===
Malinslee & Dawley Bank (2 seats)
Party	Candidate	Votes	%	±%
Labour	Shaun Davies*	1,231	35.5	
Labour	Kuldip Sahota*	1,152	–	
UKIP	Richard Choudhary	569	24.0	
UKIP	Jodie Walton	540	–	
Conservative	Ron Wood	442	18.6	
Conservative	Pauline Hossell	419	–	
Turnout		2,394	54.77	
Registered electors		4,371		
Labour win (new seat)				
Labour win (new seat)				

=== Muxton ===
Muxton (2 seats)
Party	Candidate	Votes	%	±%
Conservative	Nigel Arthur Dumore *	2,096	62.2	+9.6
Conservative	Adrian Lawrence *	2,047	–	
Labour	James Edward Lavery	1,056	31.3	–
Labour	Raj Mehta	928	–	
Turnout		3,442	67.45	+25.47
Registered electors		5,103		
Conservative hold		Swing		
Conservative hold		Swing		

=== Newport North & West ===
Newport North & West (2 seats)
Party	Candidate	Votes	%	±%
Independent	Peter John Scott	1,268	39.8	
Conservative	Tim Nelson	1,236	38.8	
Conservative	Roy Geoffrey Charles Scammell *	1,080	–	
Labour	Phil Norton	613	19.3	
UKIP	Warwick McKenzie	600	18.9	
Liberal Democrats	Sallyann Wiggin	477	15.0	
Turnout		3,199	72.31	
Registered electors		4,424		
Independent win (new seat)				
Conservative win (new seat)				

=== Newport South & East ===
Newport South & East (2 seats)
Party	Candidate	Votes	%	±%
Conservative	Eric James Carter *	1,498	53.0	
Conservative	Adrian Alma Meredith *	1,142	–	
Labour	Dylan Harrison	609	21.5	
Independent	Lyn Christine Fowler	556	19.7	
UKIP	Christina McKenzie	528	18.7	
Independent	Tim Pryce	469	16.6	
Turnout		2,859	71.42	
Registered electors		4,003		
Conservative win (new seat)				
Conservative win (new seat)				

=== Oakengates & Ketley Bank ===
Oakengates & Ketley Bank (3 seats)
Party	Candidate	Votes	%	±%
Labour	Hilda Rhodes *	1,455	39.6	
Labour	Gilly Reynolds *	1,264	–	
Labour	Stephen Reynolds	1,196	–	
Conservative	Kevin Stephens	1,087	29.6	
UKIP	Matthew James Kingston	1,084	29.5	
Conservative	Sally Noelle Jackson	1,037	–	
Conservative	Alan Scott	944	–	
Independent	Steve Reece	513	14.0	
Green	Katherine Mary McGlashan Caddick	382	10.4	
Turnout		3,702	58.96	
Registered electors		6,279		
Labour win (new seat)				
Labour win (new seat)				
Labour win (new seat)				

=== Park ===
Park
Party	Candidate	Votes	%	±%
Conservative	Barry David Tillotson	588	39.0	+8.2
Labour	John Thompson *	506	33.6	+1.4
UKIP	Mickey Baker	307	20.4	–0.2
Independent	Jason Lewis	104	6.9	N/A
Majority		82	5.4	N/A
Turnout		1,528	69.20	+15.12
Registered electors		2,208		
Conservative gain from Labour		Swing		

=== Priorslee ===
Priorslee (2 seats)
Party	Candidate	Votes	%	±%
Conservative	Ian Fletcher *	1,919	58.7	+8.1
Conservative	Veronica Fletcher *	1,758	–	
Labour	Robert Hywel Smith	781	23.9	–1.3
Independent	Roy Williams	670	20.5	–3.7
Labour	Malcolm Randle	542	–	
Green	Amber Josephine Malekin Goneni	254	7.8	N/A
Turnout		3,311	72.83	+24.59
Registered electors		4,546		
Conservative hold		Swing		
Conservative hold		Swing		

=== Shawbirch ===
Shawbirch
Party	Candidate	Votes	%	±%
Liberal Democrats	Bill Tomlinson *	604	36.0	–15.3
Conservative	Anthony Lowe	514	30.6	+5.8
Labour	Stuart James Williams	299	17.8	–6.1
UKIP	Chris Woolley	263	15.7	N/A
Majority		90	5.4	–21.1
Turnout		1,689	72.37	+24.20
Registered electors		2,334		
Liberal Democrats hold		Swing		

=== St Georges ===
St Georges (2 seats)
Party	Candidate	Votes	%	±%
Labour	Richard Andrew Overton *	1,187	42.2	–20.7
Labour	John Charles Minor *	1,119	–	
UKIP	Thomas Hoof	958	34.1	N/A
Conservative	Phoebe Catherine Nancy Phillips	745	26.5	–10.6
Conservative	Malcolm Peter Round	579	–	
Turnout		2,853	61.33	+18.71
Registered electors		4,652		
Labour hold		Swing		
Labour hold		Swing		

=== The Nedge ===
The Nedge (3 seats)
Party	Candidate	Votes	%	±%
Labour	Nathan England *	1,582	39.2	–10.3
Labour	Chris Turley *	1,474	–	
Conservative	Connor Ashlea Furnival	1,230 (Note: Following a tie for the third seat in The Nedge ward, Connor Furnival was elected by the drawing of lots.)	30.5	–3.3
Conservative	Harvey James Unwin	1,230	–	
Labour	Bill McClements *	1,226	–	
UKIP	Ray Knight	1,004	24.9	+8.2
Conservative	Marcus Maclean	992	–	
Green	Graham Statham	403	10.0	N/A
Independent	Adrian Paul Watkin	341	8.4	N/A
Turnout		4,058	58.68	+19.68
Registered electors		6,916		
Labour hold		Swing		
Labour hold		Swing		
Conservative gain from Labour		Swing		

=== Woodside ===
Woodside (2 seats)
Party	Candidate	Votes	%	±%
Labour	Rae Evans *	1,198	61.8	+6.9
Labour	Kevin Ronald Guy *	1,026	–	
Conservative	Arianne Plumbly	625	32.2	–0.4
Conservative	Katie Woodland	614	–	
Turnout		2,016	46.65	+19.45
Registered electors		4,322		
Labour hold		Swing		
Labour hold		Swing		

=== Wrockwardine ===
Wrockwardine
Party	Candidate	Votes	%	±%
Conservative	Jacqui Seymour *	980	57.2	
Labour	Joan Eva Gorse	393	22.9	
UKIP	Tony Fyfield	339	19.8	
Majority		587	34.3	
Turnout		1,738	72.72	
Registered electors		2,390		
Conservative win (new seat)				

=== Wrockwardine Wood & Trench ===
Wrockwardine Wood & Trench (2 seats)
Party	Candidate	Votes	%	±%
Labour	Shirley Ann Withers Reynolds *	1,505	52.3	+11.1
Labour	Charles Frederick Smith *	1,438	–	
Conservative	John Millington	1,126	39.2	+14.5
Conservative	Susan Wright	806	–	
Turnout		2,958	64.10	+19.17
Registered electors		4,615		
Labour hold		Swing		
Labour hold		Swing		

== Changes since 2015 Election ==
Since the 2015 election the overall control has adjusted due to a number of events, resulting in the Labour Party taking overall control.

- Cllr Clive Mollet died triggering 2016 by-election. Resulting in the seat changing to Labour Party.
- Cllr Connor Furnival switched from Conservative to Independent.
- Cllr Kevin Guy switched Labour Party to Liberal Democrats.
- Cllr Mark Boylan switched from Conservative to Labour Party.

By February 2019, the parties were in control of the following number of seats:

Party	Seats
Labour	28
Conservative	20
Liberal Democrats	4
Independent	2
