= 2011 Telford and Wrekin Council election =

2011 UK local government election

← 2007	5 May 2011	2015 →
Party	Conservative	Liberal Democrats	Labour
- Results of the 2011 Telford and Wrekin Council election
Leader of the Council before election
Conservative
Elected Leader of the Council
Labour

The 2011 elections for the whole of Telford and Wrekin Council took place on 5 May 2011. 54 councillors were elected in 33 wards and the Labour Party took control from the Conservatives. There were no boundary changes taking effect at this election.

== Election result ==
The Conservatives lost control to Labour, who gained 16 seats.

Telford and Wrekin Election Result 2011
Party	Seats	Gains	Losses	Net gain/loss	Seats %	Votes %	Votes	+/−
Labour	33	14	-	+14		45.2	38,943	
Conservative	17	1	9	-8		39.7	34,229	
Liberal Democrats	3	-	-	0		3.4	2,935	
Independent	1	-	3	-3		4.7	4,053	
Telford and Wrekin People's Association	0	-	3	-3		3.5	2,987	
UKIP	0	-	-	0		2.2	1,882	
	0	-	-	0		1.3	1,091	
BNP	0	-	-	0		0.2	145	

Seat gains/losses are in relation to the previous whole council election in 2007. During the intervening time, four seats changes hands in by-elections; the Conservatives gained four seats, 2 losses each from Labour and Independents.

== Ward results ==
Successful candidates are in bold; defending incumbents are indicated by "*". Percentages are of the total number of votes cast (In multiple member wards, each voter may vote once for each vacancy, i.e., in a three-member ward each voter has three votes).

Apley Castle (1 seat)
Party	Candidate	Votes	%	±%
Liberal Democrats	**Karen Tracy BLUNDELL***	616	52.25	
Conservative	Barry David TILLOTSON	358	30.36	
Labour	Stuart James WILLIAMS	205	17.39	
Majority		258	21.88	
Turnout		1179	51.41	
Liberal Democrats **hold**		Swing		

Arleston (1 seat)
Party	Candidate	Votes	%	±%
Labour	**Angela Diane McCLEMENTS***	699	68.33	
Conservative	David Cecil DUCE	324	31.67	
Majority		375	36.66	
Turnout		1023	41.26	
Labour **hold**		Swing		

Brookside (2 seats)
Party	Candidate	Votes	%	±%
Labour	**Arnold Richard Hugh ENGLAND**	756	26.10	
Labour	**Jacqueline LOVERIDGE**	746	25.76	
Conservative	Nicola ANDERSON	572	19.75	
Conservative	John Alan DIXON	524	18.09	
UKIP	Stuart James PARR	298	10.29	
Majority		174	6.01	
Turnout		2896	33.75	
Labour **hold**		Swing		
Labour **gain** from Conservative		Swing		

Church Aston & Lilleshall (1 seat)
Party	Candidate	Votes	%	±%
Conservative	**Andrew John EADE**	1082	78.86	
Labour	Sinah Anne WATKINS	290	21.14	
Majority		792	57.73	
Turnout		1372	53.88	
Conservative **hold**		Swing		

College (1 seat)
Party	Candidate	Votes	%	±%
Labour Co-op	**Michael Gerard ION**	415	37.22	
Independent	MCCARTHY, Patrick Michael John	368	33.00	
Conservative	David Reginald CHAPLIN	332	29.78	
Majority		47	4.22	
Turnout		1115	49.32	
Labour Co-op **gain** from Independent		Swing		

Cuckoo Oak (2 seats)
Party	Candidate	Votes	%	±%
Labour	**Derek Robert William WHITE**	801	29.20	
Labour	**Alan Arthur MACKENZIE***	735	26.80	
Conservative	Graham Phillip HOSSELL*	615	22.42	
Conservative	Pauline HOSSELL	592	21.58	
Majority		66	2.41	
Turnout		2743	37.91	
Labour **hold**		Swing		
Labour **gain** from Conservative		Swing		

Dawley Magna (3 seats)
Party	Candidate	Votes	%	±%
Labour	**Frances Molly BOULD**	1315	19.92	
Labour	**Brian Hereward DUCE**	1243	18.82	
Labour	**Clive Bertil Ashley ELLIOTT**	961	14.55	
Conservative	Alan Edward SCOTT	917	13.89	
Telford and Wrekin People's Association	Victor TONKS*	877	13.28	
Telford and Wrekin People's Association	John Henry JOHNSON	785	11.89	
Telford and Wrekin People's Association	Adrian Gilbert Peter WILLIAMS*	505	7.65	
Majority		44	0.67	
Turnout		6603	40.31	
Labour **gain** from Telford and Wrekin People's Association		Swing		
Labour **gain** from Telford and Wrekin People's Association		Swing		
Labour **gain** from Telford and Wrekin People's Association		Swing		

Donnington (2 seats)
Party	Candidate	Votes	%	±%
Labour	**Elizabeth Ann CLARE***	979	33.32	
Labour	**Clive Neil MASON***	941	32.03	
Conservative	Timothy James NELSON	448	15.25	
Conservative	Rodney Stephen PITT	405	13.78	
Independent	Graham WILLIAMSON	165	5.62	
Majority		493	16.78	
Turnout		2938	34.63	
Labour **hold**		Swing		
Labour **hold**		Swing		

Dothill (1 seat)
Party	Candidate	Votes	%	±%
Liberal Democrats	**Karen Lesley TOMLINSON***	404	41.44	
Conservative	Lesley Barbara STREET	311	31.90	
Labour	Timothy John SKIDMORE	260	26.67	
Majority		93		
Turnout		975	50.05	
Liberal Democrats **hold**		Swing		

Edgmond (1 seat)
Party	Candidate	Votes	%	±%
Conservative	**Stephen Peter BURRELL***	922	74.06	
Labour	William Walter BARTON	323	25.94	
Majority		599	48.11	
Turnout		1245	59.88	
Conservative **hold**		Swing		

Ercall (1 seat)
Party	Candidate	Votes	%	±%
Conservative	**Miles Bewick HOSKEN**	855	62.14	
Labour	Mary LEWIS	521	37.86	
Majority		334	24.27	
Turnout		1376	55.81	
Conservative **hold**		Swing		

Ercall Magna (1 seat)
Party	Candidate	Votes	%	±%
Conservative	**Stephen BENTLEY***	648	52.38	
UKIP	Gillian Elizabeth SEYMOUR	322	26.03	
Labour	Derek GORSE	267	21.58	
Majority		326	26.35	
Turnout		1237	52.28	
Conservative **hold**		Swing		

Hadley & Leegomery (3 seats)
Party	Candidate	Votes	%	±%
Labour	**Ronald Keith AUSTIN***	1277	17.33	
Labour	**Leon Albert MURRAY**	1245	16.90	
Labour	**Malcolm John SMITH***	1227	16.65	
Conservative	Reginald John SMART	881	11.96	
Conservative	Ronald Ritchie PLENDERLEITH	764	10.37	
Conservative	Roger AVELEY*	677	9.19	
Independent	George ASHCROFT	449	6.09	
Independent	Ann Marie HOUGHTON	440	5.97	
Independent	John James HOUGHTON	408	5.54	
Majority		346	4.70	
Turnout		7368	36.22	
Labour **hold**		Swing		
Labour **hold**		Swing		
Labour **gain** from Conservative		Swing		

Haygate (1 seat)
Party	Candidate	Votes	%	±%
Labour	**Robert James SLOAN**	584	56.21	
Conservative	Rosemary Grace CHAPLIN*	455	43.79	
Majority		129	12.42	
Turnout		1039	43.24	
Labour **gain** from Conservative		Swing		

Horsehay & Lightmoor (2 seats)
Party	Candidate	Votes	%	±%
Conservative	**Tracy Jean HOPE***	517	23.50	
Conservative	**Clive Paul Richard MOLLETT**	494	22.45	
Labour	Michael John Henry MACKENZIE	485	22.05	
Labour	Benjamin James WHITEHOUSE	444	20.18	
Telford and Wrekin People's Association	Graham William George WHITEHEAD	172	7.82	
Telford and Wrekin People's Association	Barry William OLLIVER	88	4.00	
Majority		9	0.41	
Turnout		2200	41.58	
Conservative **hold**		Swing		
Conservative **gain** from Independent		Swing		

Ironbridge Gorge (1 seat)
Party	Candidate	Votes	%	±%
Labour	**David Glyn DAVIES**	589	52.97	
Conservative	Elizabeth Marte MOLLETT	523	47.03	
Majority		66	5.94	
Turnout		1112	54.48	
Labour **hold**		Swing		

Ketley & Oakengates (3 seats)
Party	Candidate	Votes	%	±%
Labour	**Hilda RHODES***	1504	20.67	
Labour	**Gillian Catherine Withers REYNOLDS**	1160	15.94	
Labour	**Amrik Singh JHAWAR**	1113	15.30	
Conservative	Joy Annice FRANCIS*	1043	14.33	
Conservative	Sean KELLY*	894	12.29	
Conservative	Desmond Cecil PARKINSON	823	11.31	
	Steven Andrew George WOOD	385	5.29	
	Martin John YOUNG	354	4.87	
Majority		70	0.96	
Turnout		7276	40.86	
Labour **gain** from Conservative		Swing		
Labour **hold**		Swing		
Labour **gain** from Conservative		Swing		

Lawley & Overdale (2 seats)
Party	Candidate	Votes	%	±%
Conservative	**Elizabeth Jayne GREENAWAY***	589	23.63	
Labour	**Frederick Roy PICKEN***	525	21.06	
Labour	Santokho SEKHON	432	17.33	
Conservative	Ronald James WOOD	294	11.79	
Independent	Alan John HUSSEY	216	8.66	
	Deborah Ann CRANE	205	8.22	
Telford and Wrekin People's Association	Janet Louise HULME	131	5.25	
Telford and Wrekin People's Association	John David Ralph HIGGINSON	101	4.05	
Majority		93	3.73	
Turnout		2493	36.72	
Conservative **hold**		Swing		
Labour **hold**		Swing		

Madeley (2 seats)
Party	Candidate	Votes	%	±%
Labour	**Paul Robert WATLING**	904	31.75	
Independent	**Gillian Mary GREEN***	879	30.87	
Conservative	David George WRIGHT*	694	24.38	
Conservative	Jeremy Michael James HAIGH	370	13.00	
Majority		185	6.50	
Turnout		2847	44.05	
Independent **hold**		Swing		
Labour **gain** from Conservative		Swing		

Malinslee (2 seats)
Party	Candidate	Votes	%	±%
Labour	**Kuldip Sahota***	946	34.64	
Labour	**Shaun Davies**	893	32.70	
Conservative	Catherine Ann WORTHING	305	11.17	
Conservative	William Leonard WORTHING	259	9.48	
Telford and Wrekin People's Association	Christine Ann CHOUDHARY	184	6.74	
Telford and Wrekin People's Association	Mohammed Nasir CHOUDHARY	144	5.27	
Majority		588	21.53	
Turnout		2731	35.22	
Labour **hold**		Swing		
Labour **hold**		Swing		

Muxton (2 seats)
Party	Candidate	Votes	%	±%
Conservative	**Nigel Arthur DUGMORE**	1079	30.06	
Conservative	**Adrian LAWRENCE***	993	27.67	
Labour	Veronica Jill BROWN	641	17.86	
Labour	Dylan HARRISON	546	15.21	
Liberal Democrats	Lee James DARGUE	330	9.19	
Majority		352	9.81	
Turnout		3589	41.98	
Conservative **hold**		Swing		
Conservative **hold**		Swing		

Newport East (1 seat)
Party	Candidate	Votes	%	±%
Conservative	**Eric James CARTER***	628	64.02	
Labour	Nigel Humphrey FOSKETT	353	35.98	
Majority		275	28.03	
Turnout		981	49.72	
Conservative **hold**		Swing		

Newport North (1 seat)
Party	Candidate	Votes	%	±%
Conservative	**Roy Geoffrey SCAMMELL**	711	61.77	
Labour Co-op	Philip David NORTON	440	38.23	
Majority		271	23.54	
Turnout		1151	50.21	
Conservative **hold**		Swing		

Newport South (1 seat)
Party	Candidate	Votes	%	±%
Conservative	**Adrian Alma MEREDITH**	712	69.53	
Labour	Jane CALLISTER	312	30.47	
Majority		400	39.06	
Turnout		1024	50.91	
Conservative **hold**		Swing		

Newport West (1 seat)
Party	Candidate	Votes	%	±%
Conservative	**Adam John STANTON***	606	63.99	
Labour	Alexander Philip Charles KEEN	341	36.01	
Majority		265	27.98	
Turnout		947	45.80	
Conservative **hold**		Swing		

Park (1 seat)
Party	Candidate	Votes	%	±%
Labour	**Benjamin John THOMPSON**	352	32.35	
Conservative	Anthony BENTLEY	335	30.79	
UKIP	Denis Graham ALLEN	224	20.59	
Liberal Democrats	David John HOLLOWAY	177	16.27	
Majority		17	1.56	
Turnout		1088	54.08	
Labour **gain** from Conservative		Swing		

Priorslee (2 seats)
Party	Candidate	Votes	%	±%
Conservative	**Ian Thomas Wells FLETCHER***	1233	30.73	
Conservative	**Veronica Alma FLETCHER***	1167	29.08	
Labour	Robert Hywel SMITH	614	15.30	
Independent	Roy Ernest WILLIAMS	590	14.70	
Labour	Keith Raymond WATKINS	409	10.19	
Majority		553	13.78	
Turnout		4013	48.24	
Conservative **hold**		Swing		
Conservative **hold**		Swing		

Shawbirch (1 seat)
Party	Candidate	Votes	%	±%
Liberal Democrats	**William Leonard TOMLINSON***	592	51.34	
Conservative	Katrina Mary BAKER,	286	24.80	
Labour	Neil Andrew FURY	275	23.85	
Majority		306	26.54	
Turnout		1153	48.17	
Liberal Democrats **hold**		Swing		

St Georges (2 seats)
Party	Candidate	Votes	%	±%
Labour	**John Charles MINOR***	1179	33.31	
Labour	**Richard Andrew OVERTON***	1145	32.35	
Conservative	Frank Ernest TOWNSEND	695	19.64	
Conservative	Shaukat ALI	520	14.69	
Majority		450	12.72	
Turnout		3539	42.62	
Labour **hold**		Swing		
Labour **hold**		Swing		

The Nedge (3 seats)
Party	Candidate	Votes	%	±%
Labour	**Nathaniel Aleric Moses ENGLAND**	1223	18.04	
Labour	**Christopher Robin TURLEY**	1141	16.83	
Labour	**William Alexander Marsh MCCLEMENTS**	985	14.53	
Conservative	Harvey James UNWIN	836	12.33	
Conservative	Richard Michael TYLER*	808	11.92	
Conservative	Sheenagh Mary UNWIN	750	11.06	
UKIP	Raymond John KNIGHT	414	6.11	
UKIP	Judy SMART	345	5.09	
UKIP	Ursula Mary DOBROWOLSKA	279	4.11	
Majority		149	2.20	
Turnout		6781	39.00	
Labour **gain** from Conservative		Swing		
Labour **hold**		Swing		
Labour **hold**		Swing		

Woodside (2 seats)
Party	Candidate	Votes	%	±%
Labour	**Raemonde Catherine EVANS**	635	30.32	
Labour	**Kevin Ronald GUY**	564	26.93	
Conservative	Christopher Owen Ernest HIGGINS	377	18.00	
Conservative	Grant Nathen Lence FOXON	373	17.81	
BNP	Philip William SPENCER	145	6.92	
Majority		187	8.93	
Turnout		2094	27.20	
Labour **hold**		Swing		
Labour **hold**		Swing		

Wrockwardine (2 seats)
Party	Candidate	Votes	%	±%
Conservative	**Richard Terence KIERNAN**	1424	36.56	
Conservative	**Jacqueline M SEYMOUR***	1196	30.71	
Labour	Joan Eva GORSE	502	12.89	
Labour	Christopher Lionel LEWIS	490	12.58	
Liberal Democrats	Stephen DE LAUNEY	283	7.27	
Majority		694	17.82	
Turnout		3895	50.12	
Conservative **hold**		Swing		
Conservative **hold**		Swing		

Wrockwardine Wood & Trench (2 seats)
Party	Candidate	Votes	%	±%
Labour	**Shirley Ann Withers REYNOLDS**	1048	26.94	
Labour	**Charles Frederick SMITH***	963	24.76	
Conservative	Malcolm Peter ROUND	629	16.17	
Independent	GROOM, Robert Edward*	538	13.83	
Conservative	Sunil VERMA	384	9.87	
Liberal Democrats	Jacqueline Ann BOYLE	328	8.43	
Majority		334	8.59	
Turnout		3890	44.93	
Labour **gain** from Independent		Swing		
Labour **hold**		Swing		
