= Telford child sexual exploitation scandal =

Ongoing sexual abuse case in Shropshire, England

The Telford child sexual exploitation scandal is an ongoing scandal spanning over several decades in the United Kingdom involving a group of men who were convicted of engaging in sexual contact with local female minors between 2007 and 2009 in Telford in the English county of Shropshire.

While media reports had suggested there were 100 or more victims and around 200 suspects, the Sunday Mirror reported in March 2018 that up to 1,000 may have been affected, with some even murdered, in incidents dating back to the 1970s. Social workers and police cast doubt on this report, denying that Telford had a "discernible problem compared to other towns". However, according to the Home Office, as of 2015, Telford had the highest rate of minor exploitation cases of any town or city in the United Kingdom. The report also revealed that many of them were reported to the council but were ignored. Telford has a population of just under 170,000 people.

A report from a three-year inquiry into the scandal was released in July 2022. It revealed that more than 1,000 girls had been abused over a 40 year period, and that agencies blamed them for the abuse they suffered, not the perpetrators, and some cases were not investigated because of "nervousness about race"; a large proportion of offenders were described as being of South Asian—‌particularly Pakistani—‌origin. The report made 47 recommendations for improvement by agencies involved. West Mercia Police apologised "unequivocally" for past events as well as Telford and Wrekin Council. Victims were often blamed with excuses that they were "willingly prostituting themselves" and perpetrators were emboldened by the lack of police action.

== Overview ==
In a series of trials stretching over two years and concluding in May 2013, seven men were convicted of sexual offences against four girls aged 13 to 16. The offences included rape, controlling child prostitution, causing child prostitution, and trafficking for the purpose of prostitution. The ringleader of the gang was Ahdel "Eddie" Ali, alongside his brother Mubarek "Max". The pair offered their victims cannabis, alcohol, and money, to encourage them into having sex.

In March 2018, investigations by the Sunday Mirror alleged that the extent of the Telford grooming gang was far more vast than had previously been believed, with claims of up to 1,000 girls, most of them white, having been victims of trafficking, drugging, beating, rape and even murder. Similar with other grooming gang cases, it was alleged that the authorities failed to keep details of abusers from Asian communities for fear of being seen as racist, with police having known about gang activities since the early 1980s.

Chief Superintendent Tom Harding, of West Mercia Police, disputed the figures claimed by the Sunday Mirror. "I don't believe Telford has a discernible problem compared to other towns," he told the Shropshire Star. "Child sexual exploitation will be taking place all over the country, and Telford is not different to anywhere else. I'm confident we understand the scale of the problem here, and we have got the resources here to deal with it."

Harding also disputed claims that offenders were predominantly Asian. He reiterated that sexual offending in the town was no different proportionately from the larger breakdown of society.

== Operation Chalice ==
Location of Shropshire

West Mercia Police set up "Operation Chalice" to investigate allegations that local girls were being groomed. Officers believe that up to 100 girls were affected between 2007 and 2009.

According to a Channel 4 Dispatches investigation, "The Hunt for Britain's Sex Gangs" (2013), police were told that men in Telford would "ejaculate and then urinate in children's mouths". There were also allegations of "gang-rape by queues of men while girls were held hostage for hours, sometimes days—all the while being forced to listen to the screams of girls in other rooms with other men".

== Convictions ==
Name	Age	Conviction	Sentence
Ahdel "Eddie" Ali	25	"one charge of rape, 11 charges of sexual activity with a child, three charges of controlling child prostitution, one of inciting child prostitution, a charge of inciting a child to engage in sexual activity and meeting a child after grooming"	18 years
Mubarek "Max" Ali	29	"four charges of controlling child prostitution, two of trafficking in the UK for sexual exploitation and a charge of causing child prostitution"	14 years
Mohammed Islam Choudhrey	54	"paying for sex with a Telford schoolgirl"	2 years 6 months
Mohammed Ali Sultan	26	"having sex with two teenage girls, one of whom was 13 years old"	7 years
Mohammed Younis	61	"allowing his flat to be used as a brothel by allowing a man to have sex with a girl who was being controlled as a prostitute"	2 years 6 months
Mahroof Khan	35	"having sex with a 15-year-old girl"	2 years 6 months
Tanveer Ahmed	40	"controlling a child prostitute"	2 years 6 months

== Inquiry ==
=== Call for independent inquiry ===
On 26 October 2016, the Conservative MP for Telford, Lucy Allan, called for an independent inquiry. She said she had a meeting with a victim of the abuse, who told her that many of the worst offenders had not been prosecuted and were still living in the area. Allan said that she would be asking the then prime minister, Theresa May, to take action.

=== Independent inquiry and report ===
A report that resulted from an independent inquiry chaired by Tom Crowther QC was released on 12 July 2022. The report found that more than 1,000 girls had been abused over a 40 year period, and their abuse was ignored for decades due to "nervousness about race" in the belief that investigation against Asian men would inflame "racial tensions". It found that teachers and social workers were discouraged from reporting child sexual abuse, and authorities tended to blame the children instead of the perpetrators, dismissing reports of child exploitation as "child prostitution". The report also concluded that information was not properly shared between agencies.

Crowther said that “A high proportion of those cases involved perpetrators that were described by victims/survivors and others as being Asian or, often, Pakistani,” but said that offenders had come from a variety of ethnic backgrounds and it would be “wholly wrong, and undoubtedly racist, to equate membership of a particular racial group with propensity to commit [child sexual exploitation]”.

Speaking after the publication of the report, West Mercia Police's Assistant Chief Constable, Richard Cooper said he was embarrassed to acknowledge the failures of the past, but insisted there was now a very different approach. "The victims are seen as victims and we are absolutely dedicated to the protection of children," he told reporters. "There was not the cohesion that there is today. We have set up teams incorporating police and other agencies."

== See also ==
- Murder of the Lowe family – 2000 murder of a child sexual abuse victim and her family in Telford, later brought up to scare other victims into silence
- Child sexual abuse in the United Kingdom
- List of sexual abuses perpetrated by groups
