= 2019 Telford and Wrekin Council election =

2019 UK local government election

- 2 May 2019

All 54 seats to Telford and Wrekin Council 28 seats needed for a majority
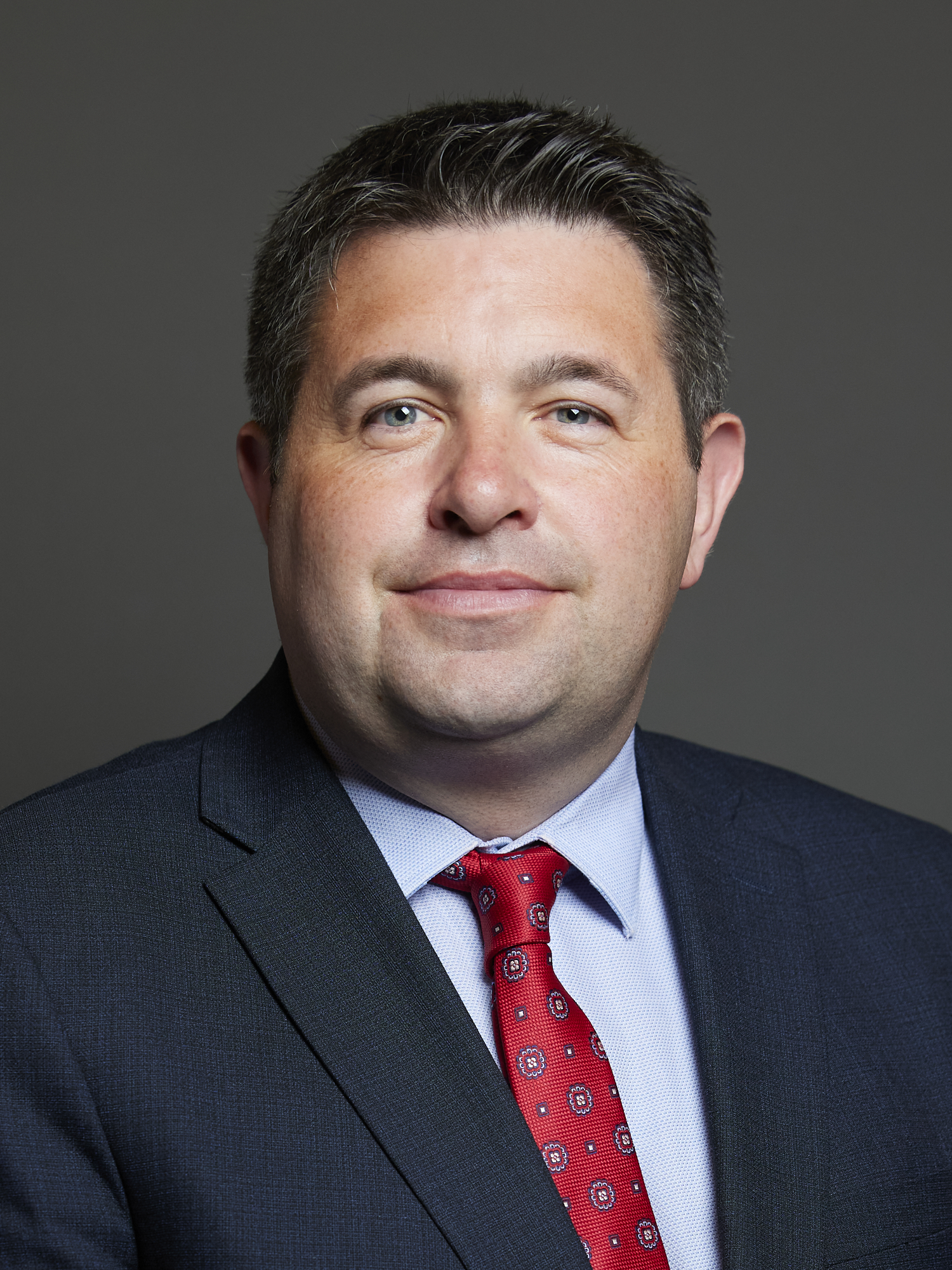

	First party	Second party
Leader	Shaun Davies	Andrew Eade
Party	Labour	Conservative
Last election	27 seats, 38.1%	23 seats, 41.4%
Seats won	36	13
Seat change	▲9	▼10
Popular vote	35,767	28,131
Percentage	47.6%	37.4%
Swing	▲9.5%	▼4.0%
	Third party	Fourth party
Party	Liberal Democrats	Independent
Last election	4 seats, 2.9%	1 seat, 3.9%
Seats won	4	1
Seat change	▲1	Steady
Popular vote	5,482	3,503
Percentage	7.3%	4.7%
Swing	▲5.4%	▲0.9%
- Results of the 2019 Telford and Wrekin Council election
Council control before election
No overall control
Council control after election
Labour

The 2019 Telford and Wrekin Council election took place on 2 May 2019 to elect members of the Telford and Wrekin Council in England. It was held on the same day as other local elections.

The Labour group, led by Shaun Davies, increased their number of councillors by 9, giving them an overall majority. The Conservative group, led by Andrew Eade, lost 10 councillors.

== Summary ==
=== Election result ===
2019 Telford & Wrekin Borough Council election
Party	Candidates	Seats	Gains	Losses	Net gain/loss	Seats %	Votes %	Votes	+/−
Labour	51	36	9	0	▲9	66.7	47.6	35,767	+9.5
Conservative	50	13	0	10	▼10	24.1	37.4	28,131	–4.0
Liberal Democrats	14	4	1	0	▲1	7.4	7.3	5,482	+5.4
Independent	6	1	0	0	Steady	1.9	4.7	3,503	+0.9
UKIP	6	0	0	0	Steady	0.0	2.7	2,032	–9.0
Green	1	0	0	0	Steady	0.0	0.3	221	–2.7

== Ward results ==
=== Admaston & Bratton ===
Admaston & Bratton
Party	Candidate	Votes	%	±%
Conservative	Terry Kiernan	502	61.7	
Labour	Joan Gorse	186	22.9	
Liberal Democrats	Josh Tomlinson	126	15.5	
Majority				
Turnout				
Conservative hold		Swing		

=== Apley Castle ===
Apley Castle
Party	Candidate	Votes	%	±%
Liberal Democrats	Karen Blundell	632	59.1	
Conservative	Becky Eade	256	23.9	
Labour	John Parkin	181	16.9	
Majority				
Turnout				
Liberal Democrats hold		Swing		

=== Arleston ===
Arleston
Party	Candidate	Votes	%	±%
Labour	Angela McClements	602	81.2	
Conservative	Dorothy Roberts	139	18.8	
Majority				
Turnout				
Labour hold		Swing		

=== Brookside ===
Brookside
Party	Candidate	Votes	%	±%
Labour	Jackie Loveridge	519	38.8	
Labour	Arnold England	488		
Conservative	Stuart Parr	314	23.5	
Liberal Democrats	Shana Roberts	270	20.2	
UKIP	Peter Roberts	236	17.6	
Conservative	Ian Pryce	189		
Majority				
Turnout				
Labour hold				
Labour hold				

=== Church Aston & Lilleshall ===
Church Aston & Lilleshall
Party	Candidate	Votes	%	±%
Conservative	Andrew Eade	699	70.0	
Liberal Democrats	David Ellams	191	19.1	
Labour	Robert Sloan	109	10.9	
Majority				
Turnout				
Conservative hold		Swing		

=== College ===
College
Party	Candidate	Votes	%	±%
Labour	Lee Carter	500	50.2	
Conservative	Eddie Lowe	276	27.7	
Green	Pat McCarthy	221	22.2	
Majority				
Turnout				
Labour hold		Swing		

=== Dawley & Aqueduct ===
Dawley & Aqueduct
Party	Candidate	Votes	%	±%
Labour	Jane Pinter	1,212	61.8	
Labour	Andrew Burford	1,157		
Labour	Concepta Cassar	1,030		
Conservative	Kate Barnes	748	38.2	
Conservative	Steve Barnes	725		
Conservative	Stephen Dunne	571		
Majority				
Turnout				
Labour hold				
Labour hold				
Labour gain from Conservative				

=== Donnington ===
Donnington
Party	Candidate	Votes	%	±%
Labour	Elizabeth Clare	681	52.5	
Labour	James Lavery	635		
Conservative	Martyn Edwards	324	25.0	
UKIP	Bryan Muirden	292	22.5	
Conservative	Philip Loughlin	227		
Majority				
Turnout				
Labour hold				
Labour hold				

=== Dothill ===
Dothill
Party	Candidate	Votes	%	±%
Liberal Democrats	Karen Tomlinson	459	49.7	
Conservative	Lisa Jinks	202	21.9	
Labour	John Latter	140	15.2	
UKIP	Anthony Wood	123	13.3	
Majority				
Turnout				
Liberal Democrats hold		Swing		

=== Edgmond & Ercall Magna ===
Edgmond & Ercall Magna
Party	Candidate	Votes	%	±%
Conservative	Stephen Bentley	1,258	68.5	
Conservative	Stephen Burrell	1,188		
Liberal Democrats	Sally Wiggin	333	18.1	
Liberal Democrats	Mark Wiggin	274		
Labour	William McClements	246	13.4	
Labour	Derek Gorse	241		
Majority				
Turnout				
Conservative hold				
Conservative hold				

=== Ercall ===
Ercall
Party	Candidate	Votes	%	±%
Conservative	Miles Hosken	567	51.9	
Labour	Giles Luter	526	48.1	
Majority				
Turnout				
Conservative hold		Swing		

=== Hadley & Leegomery ===
Hadley & Leegomery
Party	Candidate	Votes	%	±%
Labour	Leon Murray	1,319	68.7	
Labour	Gemma Offland	1,267		
Labour	Malcolm Smith	1,247		
Conservative	Andrew Benion	601	31.3	
Conservative	Sylvia Hall	561		
Conservative	Jeremy Haigh	522		
Majority				
Turnout				
Labour hold				
Labour hold				
Labour hold				

=== Haygate ===
Haygate
Party	Candidate	Votes	%	±%
Labour	Graham Cook	401	47.5	
Conservative	John Alvey	303	35.9	
Independent	Tim Wills	141	16.7	
Majority				
Turnout				
Labour hold		Swing		

=== Horsehay & Lightmoor ===
Horsehay & Lightmoor
Party	Candidate	Votes	%	±%
Labour	Raj Mehta	844	51.4	
Conservative	Jayne Greenaway	798	48.6	
Conservative	Gareth Thomas	478		
Majority				
Turnout				
Labour gain from Conservative				
Conservative hold				

=== Ironbridge Gorge ===
Ironbridge Gorge
Party	Candidate	Votes	%	±%
Labour	Carolyn Healy	707	62.6	
Conservative	Nicola Lowery	423	37.4	
Majority				
Turnout				
Labour gain from Conservative		Swing		

=== Ketley & Overdale ===
Ketley & Overdale
Party	Candidate	Votes	%	±%
Labour	Amrik Jhawar	912	40.3	
Labour	Mark Boylan	833		
Labour	Eileen Callear	796		
Conservative	Joy Francis	792	35.0	
Conservative	Lee Vidor	585		
Independent	Andrew Morris	557	24.6	
Conservative	Rupal Karpe	532		
Majority				
Turnout				
Labour gain from Conservative				
Labour gain from Conservative				
Labour gain from Conservative				

=== Madeley & Sutton Hill ===
Madeley & Sutton Hill
Party	Candidate	Votes	%	±%
Labour	Paul Watling	1,095	55.1	
Labour	Janice Jones	1,072		
Labour	Derek White	1,065		
Conservative	Dave Wright	892	44.9	
Conservative	Graham Hossell	688		
Conservative	Pauline Hossell	677		
Majority				
Turnout				
Labour gain from Conservative				
Labour hold				
Labour hold				

=== Malinslee & Dawley Bank ===
Malinslee & Dawley Bank
Party	Candidate	Votes	%	±%
Labour	Shaun Davies	927	78.4	
Labour	Kuldip Sahota	847		
Conservative	Tammy Wood	255	21.6	
Majority				
Turnout				
Labour hold		Swing		
Labour hold		Swing		

=== Muxton ===
Muxton
Party	Candidate	Votes	%	±%
Conservative	Nigel Dugmore	1,005	69.8	
Conservative	Adrian Lawrence	976		
Labour	Sophie Thompson	434	30.2	
Labour	William Barton	431		
Majority				
Turnout				
Conservative hold				
Conservative hold				

=== Newport North & West ===
Newport North & West
Party	Candidate	Votes	%	±%
Independent	Peter Scott	1,329	47.6	
Conservative	Tim Nelson	802	28.7	
Conservative	Bill Harper	572		
Labour	Phil Norton	388	13.9	
Liberal Democrats	Nicholas Garvey	274	9.8	
Majority				
Turnout				
Independent hold				
Conservative hold				

=== Newport South & East ===
Newport South & East
Party	Candidate	Votes	%	±%
Liberal Democrats	Thomas Janke	1,040	48.5	
Conservative	Eric Carter	730	34.0	
Liberal Democrats	Sarah Syrda	690		
Conservative	Emma Thomas	520		
Labour	Tom King	374	17.4	
Majority				
Turnout				
Liberal Democrats gain from Conservative				
Conservative hold				

=== Oakengates & Katley Bank ===
Oakengates & Katley Bank
Party	Candidate	Votes	%	±%
Labour	Hilda Rhodes	1,078	43.6	
Labour	Stephen Reynolds	981		
Labour	Gilly Reynolds	979		
UKIP	Nick Dunn	507	20.5	
Conservative	Lindsey Sharratt	488	19.7	
UKIP	William Gilmour	465		
Conservative	Matthew Kingston	454		
UKIP	Craig Triplett	409		
Independent	Alan Maddy	398	16.1	
Majority				
Turnout				
Labour hold				
Labour hold				
Labour hold				

=== Park ===
Park
Party	Candidate	Votes	%	±%
Labour	John Thompson	384	47.5	
Conservative	Barry Tillotson	314	38.9	
Liberal Democrats	Patricia Fairclough	110	13.6	
Majority				
Turnout				
Labour gain from Conservative		Swing		

=== Priorslee ===
Priorslee
Party	Candidate	Votes	%	±%
Conservative	Ian Fletcher	994	60.2	
Conservative	Veronica Fletcher	958		
Labour	Gurdip Singh	656	39.8	
Labour	Adrian Foster	592		
Majority				
Turnout				
Conservative hold				
Conservative hold				

=== Shawbirch ===
Shawbirch
Party	Candidate	Votes	%	±%
Liberal Democrats	Bill Tomlinson	620	61.6	
Conservative	Anthony Lowe	296	29.4	
Labour	Usman Ahmed	90	8.9	
Majority				
Turnout				
Liberal Democrats hold		Swing		

=== St. George's ===
St. George's
Party	Candidate	Votes	%	±%
Labour	David Wright	910	60.3	
Labour	Richard Overton	889		
Conservative	Thomas Hoof	599	39.7	
Conservative	Jay Gough	462		
Majority				
Turnout				
Labour hold				
Labour hold				

=== The Nedge ===
The Nedge
Party	Candidate	Votes	%	±%
Labour	Nathan England	880	39.1	
Labour	Christopher Turley	830		
Labour	Vanessa Holt	774		
Independent	Connor Furnival	576	25.6	
Conservative	Tom Wust	557	24.8	
Independent	Greg Sinclair	502		
Conservative	John Baker	475		
Conservative	Robert Cadman	437		
Liberal Democrats	Paul Bryant	236	10.5	
Majority				
Turnout				
Labour hold				
Labour hold				
Labour gain from Conservative				

=== Woodside ===
Woodside
Party	Candidate	Votes	%	±%
Labour	Kelly Middleton	504	54.2	
Labour	Rae Evans	418		
Liberal Democrats	Greg Spruce	227	24.4	
Conservative	Alan Scott	199	21.4	
Majority				
Turnout				
Labour hold		Swing		
Labour hold		Swing		

=== Wrockwardine ===
Wrockwardine
Party	Candidate	Votes	%	±%
Conservative	Jacqui Seymour	555	63.9	
Labour	Paul Davis	313	36.1	
Majority				
Turnout				
Conservative hold		Swing		

=== Wrockwardine Wood & Trench ===
Wrockwardine Wood & Trench
Party	Candidate	Votes	%	±%
Labour	Shirley Reynolds	1,101	71.2	
Labour	Charles Smith	976		
Conservative	David Haigh	446	28.8	
Majority				
Turnout				
Labour hold				
Labour hold				

== By-elections ==
=== Dawley & Aqueduct ===
Dawley & Aqueduct: 16 December 2021
Party	Candidate	Votes	%	±%
Labour	Bob Wennington	996	55.8	+4.9
Conservative	Kate Barnes	735	41.2	−5.2
Liberal Democrats	Catherine Salter	55	3.1	+0.3
Majority		261	14.6	
Turnout		1,798	26.3	
Labour hold		Swing	▲5.1	

=== Brookside ===
Brookside: 7 April 2022
Party	Candidate	Votes	%	±%
Labour	Jim Loveridge	531	58.8	+20.0
Conservative	Chris Leach	318	35.2	+11.8
Liberal Democrats	Paul Howard	54	6.0	−11.6
Majority		213	23.6	+8.3
Turnout		915	21.8	
Labour hold		Swing	▲4.1	
