= Telford (constituency) =

UK Parliament constituency (since 1997)

Coordinates: 52.678°N 2.449°W

- Borough constituency for the House of Commons
- Boundaries since 2024
- Boundary of Telford in West Midlands region
- County: Shropshire
- Electorate: 65,938 (December 2010)

Current constituency
- Created: 1997
- Member of Parliament: Shaun Davies (Labour)
- Seats: One
- Created from: The Wrekin

Telford is a constituency (Note: A borough constituency (for the purposes of election expenses and type of returning officer)) represented in the House of Commons of the UK Parliament since 2024 by Shaun Davies of the Labour Party (Note: As with all constituencies, the constituency elects one Member of Parliament (MP) by the first past the post system of election at least every five years.).

== Constituency profile ==
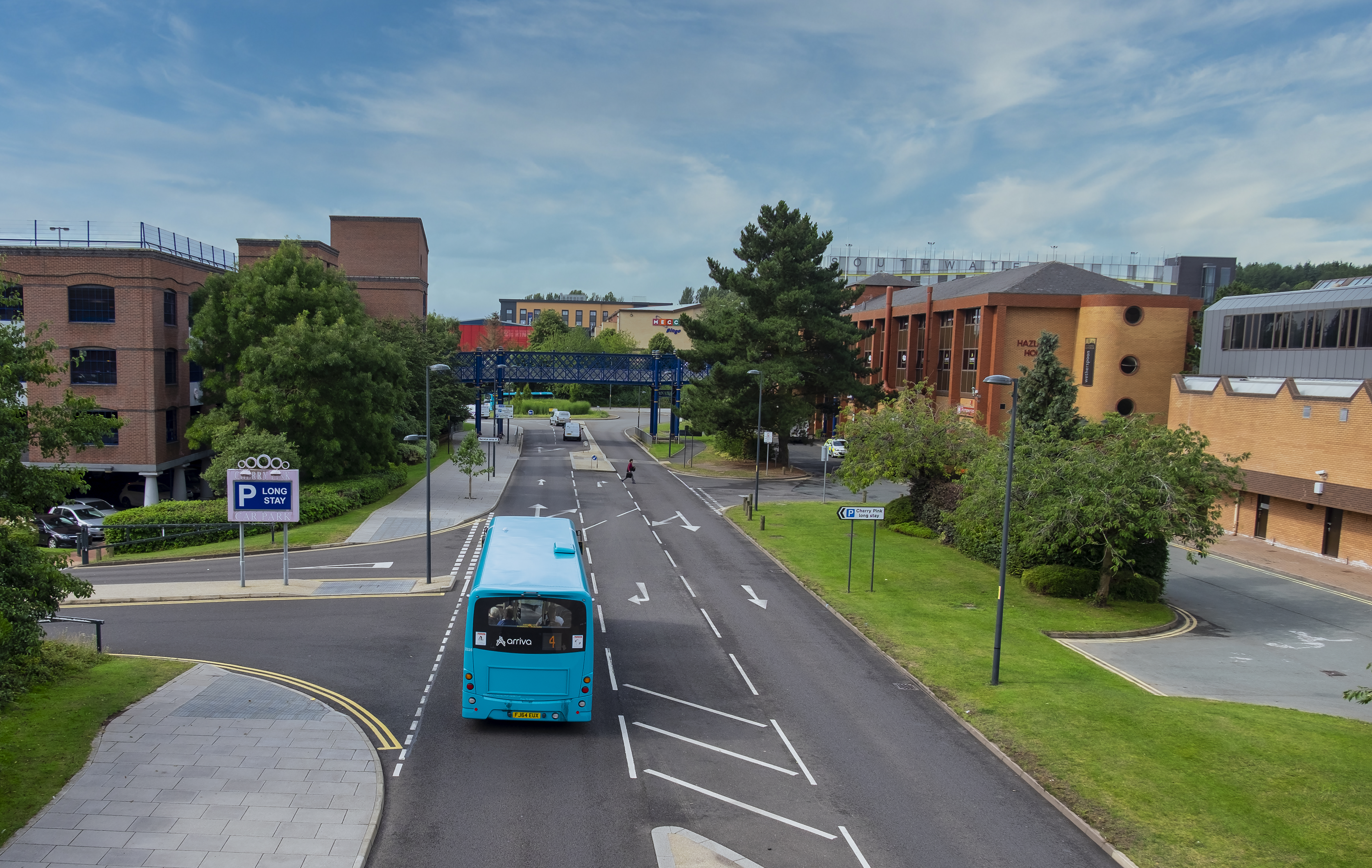
Grange Central, Telford

Telford is a constituency in Shropshire in the West Midlands region of England. It covers most of the town of Telford, including the constituent towns of Coalbrookdale, Madeley, Dawley and Oakengates.

Telford is a polycentric town that was mostly developed as a new town during the 1970s to accommodate overspill from Birmingham and the Black Country. Telford was traditionally made up of separate, smaller market towns. This area was historically reliant on the mining industry, particularly coal and iron, although it is now a centre for the technology sector. Much of Telford is highly-deprived, especially in Dawley and Madeley, where many residents live in socially-rented terraced and semi-detached properties. House prices in Telford are generally lower than the rest of the West Midlands and considerably lower than the UK average.

Telford has a similar age profile to the rest of the country, although there is a below-average proportion of retirees. Residents have low levels of income and homeownership and the child poverty rate is high. They generally have low levels of education and a high proportion work in the manufacturing, business administration and public sectors. The percentage of residents claiming unemployment benefits is above-average. White people made up 89% of the population at the 2021 census.

At the local council, almost all seats in this constituency are represented by the Labour Party, although some Conservatives were elected in the affluent suburb of Priorslee. Voters in Telford strongly supported leaving the European Union in the 2016 referendum; an estimated 67% voted in favour of Brexit compared to the UK-wide figure of 52%.

== Boundaries ==
Telford is made up of several old industrial towns to the north of the River Severn and on the eastern flanks of the Wrekin (including Madeley, Dawley and the small townships in the Ironbridge Gorge) and numerous New Town developments including Woodside. However, not all of the Telford New Town developments are in the constituency; the northern parts and some western areas (including the town of Wellington which pre-dates Telford) are in The Wrekin constituency.

All of the constituency is covered by Telford and Wrekin Council.

1997–2010: The District of The Wrekin wards of Brookside, Cuckoo Oak, Dawley Magna, Hollinswood/Randlay, Ironbridge (The Gorge), Ketley Bank, Langley, Lawley, Madeley, Malinslee, Priorslee, Stirchley, Wombridge, Woodside, and Wrockwardine Wood.

2010–2024: The Borough of Telford and Wrekin wards of Brookside, Cuckoo Oak, Dawley Magna, Horsehay and Lightmoor, Ironbridge Gorge, Ketley and Oakengates, Lawley and Overdale, Madeley, Malinslee, Priorslee, St George's, The Nedge, Woodside, Wrockwardine Wood, and Trench.

Boundary changes to realign the constituency boundaries to fit with the borough's most recent ward revisions resulted in the addition of Ketley (from the constituency of The Wrekin) for the 2010 general election.

2024–present: The 2023 Periodic Review of Westminster constituencies resulted in a slight boundary adjustment to accommodate changes in ward boundaries. Following a further local government boundary review which came into effect in May 2023, the constituency now comprises the following wards of the Borough of Telford and Wrekin from the 2024 general election:

- Brookside; Dawley & Aqueduct; Horsehay & Lightmoor; Ironbridge Gorge; Ketley; Lawley (most); Madeley & Sutton Hill; Malinslee & Dawley Bank; Oakengates & Ketley Bank; Overdale & The Rock; Priorslee; St. Georges; The Nedge; Woodside; Wrockwardine Wood & Trench; and a very small part of Donnington.

== History ==
Created from the more rural Wrekin constituency for the 1997 general election, Telford was continuously held by the Labour Party, with a change in candidate in 2001, until the 2015 general election when the Conservatives took the seat from David Wright. Bruce Grocott was its first-ever MP, serving for the first four years. In 2010 Wright's majority fell to a marginal figure of 981 votes, and he lost in 2015 by 730 votes – one of the small number of Conservative gains from Labour in that election, which in turn helped to give the Conservatives an overall parliamentary majority. The seat was retained by Lucy Allan in 2017 with an almost identical majority of 720, and again by Allan in 2019 with a majority of 10,941, one of the most significant Conservative marginal seat holds in that election.

In June 2023 Allan announced she would not stand at the forthcoming general election, and in May 2024, 3 days before the end of her term, she was suspended from the Conservative Party for publicly supporting the Reform UK candidate, Alan Adams. The subsequent election was won by Shaun Davies of the Labour Party, with a majority of 8,102 over Adams who beat the Conservative candidate into third place.

== Members of Parliament ==
| Election | Member | Party |
|---|---|---|
| 1997 | Bruce Grocott | Labour |
| 2001 | David Wright | Labour |
| 2015 | Lucy Allan | Conservative |
| May 2024 | Lucy Allan | Independent |
| 2024 | Shaun Davies | Labour |

== Elections ==
=== Elections in the 2020s ===
General election 2024: Telford
| Party | Candidate | Votes | % | ±% |
|---|---|---|---|---|
| Labour | Shaun Davies | 18,212 | 44.7 | +10.4 |
| Reform | Alan Adams | 10,110 | 24.8 | N/A |
| Conservative | Hannah Campbell | 8,728 | 21.4 | –38.0 |
| Green | John Adams | 2,120 | 5.2 | +5.1 |
| Liberal Democrats | Jo McKenna | 1,560 | 3.8 | −2.4 |
| Majority | | 8,102 | 19.9 | −5.7 |
| Turnout | | 40,730 | 55.4 | –6.7 |
| Labour gain from Conservative | | Swing | | |

=== Elections in the 2010s ===
General election 2019: Telford
| Party | Candidate | Votes | % | ±% |
|---|---|---|---|---|
| Conservative | Lucy Allan | 25,546 | 59.7 | +11.0 |
| Labour | Katrina Gilman | 14,605 | 34.1 | –13.0 |
| Liberal Democrats | Shana Roberts | 2,674 | 6.2 | +4.1 |
| Majority | | 10,941 | 25.6 | +25.0 |
| Turnout | | 42,825 | 62.1 | –4.2 |
| Conservative hold | | Swing | +12.0 | |

Results of UK House of Commons seat Telford, created in 1997, since 2005.

General election 2017: Telford
| Party | Candidate | Votes | % | ±% |
|---|---|---|---|---|
| Conservative | Lucy Allan | 21,777 | 48.7 | +9.1 |
| Labour | Kuldip Sahota | 21,057 | 47.1 | +9.3 |
| Liberal Democrats | Susan King | 954 | 2.1 | −0.2 |
| Green | Luke Shirley | 898 | 2.0 | –0.3 |
| Majority | | 720 | 1.6 | –0.2 |
| Turnout | | 44,686 | 66.3 | +4.9 |
| Conservative hold | | Swing | –0.1 | |

General election 2015: Telford
| Party | Candidate | Votes | % | ±% |
|---|---|---|---|---|
| Conservative | Lucy Allan | 16,094 | 39.6 | +3.3 |
| Labour | David Wright | 15,364 | 37.8 | –0.9 |
| UKIP | Denis Allen | 7,330 | 18.0 | +12.1 |
| Green | Peter Hawkins | 930 | 2.3 | New |
| Liberal Democrats | Ian Croll | 927 | 2.3 | –13.2 |
| Majority | | 730 | 1.8 | N/A |
| Turnout | | 40,645 | 61.4 | –2.1 |
| Conservative gain from Labour | | Swing | +2.1 | |

General election 2010: Telford
| Party | Candidate | Votes | % | ±% |
|---|---|---|---|---|
| Labour | David Wright | 15,974 | 38.7 | –9.5 |
| Conservative | Tom Biggins | 14,996 | 36.3 | +3.2 |
| Liberal Democrats | Phillip Bennion | 6,399 | 15.5 | +1.4 |
| UKIP | Denis Allen | 2,428 | 5.9 | +1.2 |
| BNP | Phil Spencer | 1,513 | 3.7 | New |
| Majority | | 978 | 2.4 | –13.4 |
| Turnout | | 41,310 | 63.5 | +4.8 |
| Labour hold | | Swing | –6.3 | |

=== Elections in the 2000s ===
General election 2005: Telford
| Party | Candidate | Votes | % | ±% |
|---|---|---|---|---|
| Labour | David Wright | 16,506 | 48.3 | –6.3 |
| Conservative | Stella Kyriazis | 11,100 | 32.5 | +5.1 |
| Liberal Democrats | Ian Jenkins | 4,941 | 14.4 | +1.5 |
| UKIP | Tom McCartney | 1,659 | 4.9 | +1.3 |
| Majority | | 5,406 | 15.8 | –11.4 |
| Turnout | | 34,206 | 57.7 | +5.7 |
| Labour hold | | Swing | –5.7 | |

General election 2001: Telford
| Party | Candidate | Votes | % | ±% |
|---|---|---|---|---|
| Labour | David Wright | 16,854 | 54.6 | –3.2 |
| Conservative | Andrew Henderson | 8,471 | 27.4 | 0.0 |
| Liberal Democrats | Sallyann Wiggin | 3,983 | 12.9 | +1.1 |
| UKIP | Nicola Brookes | 1,098 | 3.6 | New |
| Socialist Alliance | Michael Jeffries | 469 | 1.5 | New |
| Majority | | 8,383 | 27.2 | –3.2 |
| Turnout | | 30,875 | 52.0 | –13.6 |
| Labour hold | | Swing | | |

=== Elections in the 1990s ===
General election 1997: Telford
| Party | Candidate | Votes | % |
|---|---|---|---|
| Labour | Bruce Grocott | 21,456 | 57.8 |
| Conservative | Bernard Gentry | 10,166 | 27.4 |
| Liberal Democrats | Nathaniel Green | 4,371 | 11.8 |
| Referendum | Christopher Morris | 1,119 | 3.0 |
| Majority | | 11,290 | 30.4 |
| Turnout | | 37,112 | 65.6 |
| Labour win (new seat) | | | |

== See also ==
- Parliamentary constituencies in Shropshire
- List of parliamentary constituencies in West Midlands (region)
