= Murder of the Lowe family =

2000 mass murder in England

On 5 August 2000, 26-year-old taxi driver Azhar Ali Mehmood started a fire at the Telford home of 16-year-old Lucy Lowe, with whom he had been engaging in illegal sexual activity (Note: In England and Wales, "sexual activity" is a legal term used to describe sexual contact between an adult and a child that is over the age of 13 (see statutory rape for clarification).) since she was 14. The fire killed her and her unborn child, her 17-year-old disabled sister Sarah, and her 49-year-old mother Eileen Linda. Her 53-year-old father George survived. Mehmood escaped with Tasnim, his baby daughter by Lowe.

In October 2001, Mehmood was sentenced to three life sentences for the three murders, plus a fourth for the attempted murder of George Lowe. After 18 years, he was eligible for parole. He has been denied parole three times.

Following a 2018 investigation by the Sunday Mirror, the murders have received attention for possible connections to the Telford child sexual exploitation scandal. Tasnim Lowe featured in a BBC Three documentary that year in which she read her mother's diary entries recounting sexual exploitation. She called for West Mercia Police to charge her father with sexual offences, which the force did not do. At a 2022 inquiry, members of the force defended not charging Mahmood with sexual offences.

== Murders ==
Mehmood had started an illegal relationship with Lucy Lowe when he was 24 and she was 14, and a year later she was pregnant with their daughter. Once when Lucy Lowe and Mehmood were in her bedroom and she called for help as he was raping her, George Lowe broke the door down and chased Mehmood from the house, but neither he nor his wife reported the rape to the police. George Lowe later reflected that he "didn't take much interest" in the illegal relationship at the time. According to Lucy Lowe's friends, Mehmood was jealous and possessive, and believed that she was having sex with other men.

Mehmood claimed that he was asleep in the house and was awoken by a smoke alarm before leaping from a window to safety. In fact, he was recorded on CCTV buying petrol at 3:28 a.m., and 11 minutes later was sighted by a neighbour who called the fire brigade. Traces of petrol were found in the downstairs rooms, and the fire trapped the three victims upstairs.

In 2000, Telford had been in the news for the deaths by hanging of two related black men, incidents which some relatives believed to have been suicides as a result of racist threats, or murders; the father of one of the men dismissed that suggestion. Police said during the investigation that they had no evidence or allegations that the Lowe fire was racially motivated. Mehmood, who was hospitalised with smoke inhalation, said "We were both ecstatic [about the second pregnancy]. We were going to get married and I have been doing up a place for us all to move into."

== Grooming links and inquiries ==
After the murders, George Lowe won custody of his granddaughter Tasnim after a legal battle with her paternal family. She was raised by him and his elderly mother.

In March 2018, the Sunday Mirror published an investigation concluding that the Telford child sexual exploitation scandal was the "worst ever" such case, with an estimated 1,000 victims since the 1980s. The front page used an image of Lucy Lowe, and the report said that the murders were used to scare other victims into silence. George Lowe said that he should have been "tougher" on Mehmood and that he had been threatened by an anonymous telephone call for raising the suspicion of grooming. The Sunday Mirror also linked the death of a 13-year-old girl in a car crash to her experiences of grooming, and the death of a 20-year-old woman from drugs as a result of being introduced to crack cocaine by abusers at the age of 12. A 2022 inquiry also heard that the murder of the Lowes was brought up by abusers in Telford to scare victims into silence.

Later in 2018, Tasnim Lowe made a three-part documentary for BBC Three investigating her family's murders and any links to sexual exploitation. During filming, the police handed over her mother's diaries, which had survived the fire. In them, she wrote about being taken to perform sexual acts on multiple older men. Tasnim Lowe demanded to know why her father was never prosecuted for sexual offences despite her mother being under the age of consent when impregnated; West Mercia Police declined to comment.

Detective Chief Inspector Clive Harding, who investigated the murder when it happened, wrote in March 2018 that "Although she had a child with him under 16, they were together for years before he set the house alight. He was convicted of murder and there is nothing further to review (nothing to do with Operation Chalice)". He added that there was little merit in securing further convictions for a man with four life sentences, to which another detective replied "We need to establish whether the other offences were not recognised, or recognised and considered irrelevant in context of the murders". His son, Superintendent Tom Harding, then signalled that the case would not be reviewed.

Clive Harding declined to testify to the 2022 inquiry into the exploitation and murders, saying that he would not be able to add anything that was not already written down; another detective Geoff Harding gave a brief written disposition saying that he remembered nothing from his time working in child protection in both the police and Telford and Wrekin Council. The inquiry's leader Tom Crowther criticised Clive and Geoff Harding for their lack of contributions.

== Appeals and parole hearings ==
Mehmood, who maintained his innocence, appealed his conviction in August 2002. He appealed again in 2014, claiming to have been rehabilitated during his incarceration. His appeal was rejected, with the judges citing his lack of acknowledgement for his actions and that his minimum sentence would have been 30 years and not 18 under new laws.

In June 2020, Mehmood was eligible for parole, which was denied, as well as his request to be transferred to an open prison. The same requests were rejected for the second time in September 2022, as Mehmood was evaluated as still posing a risk to the public. His parole bid was rejected again in July 2025.
