= 2023 Telford and Wrekin Council election =

2023 UK local government election

- 4 May 2023

All 54 seats to Telford and Wrekin Council 28 seats needed for a majority
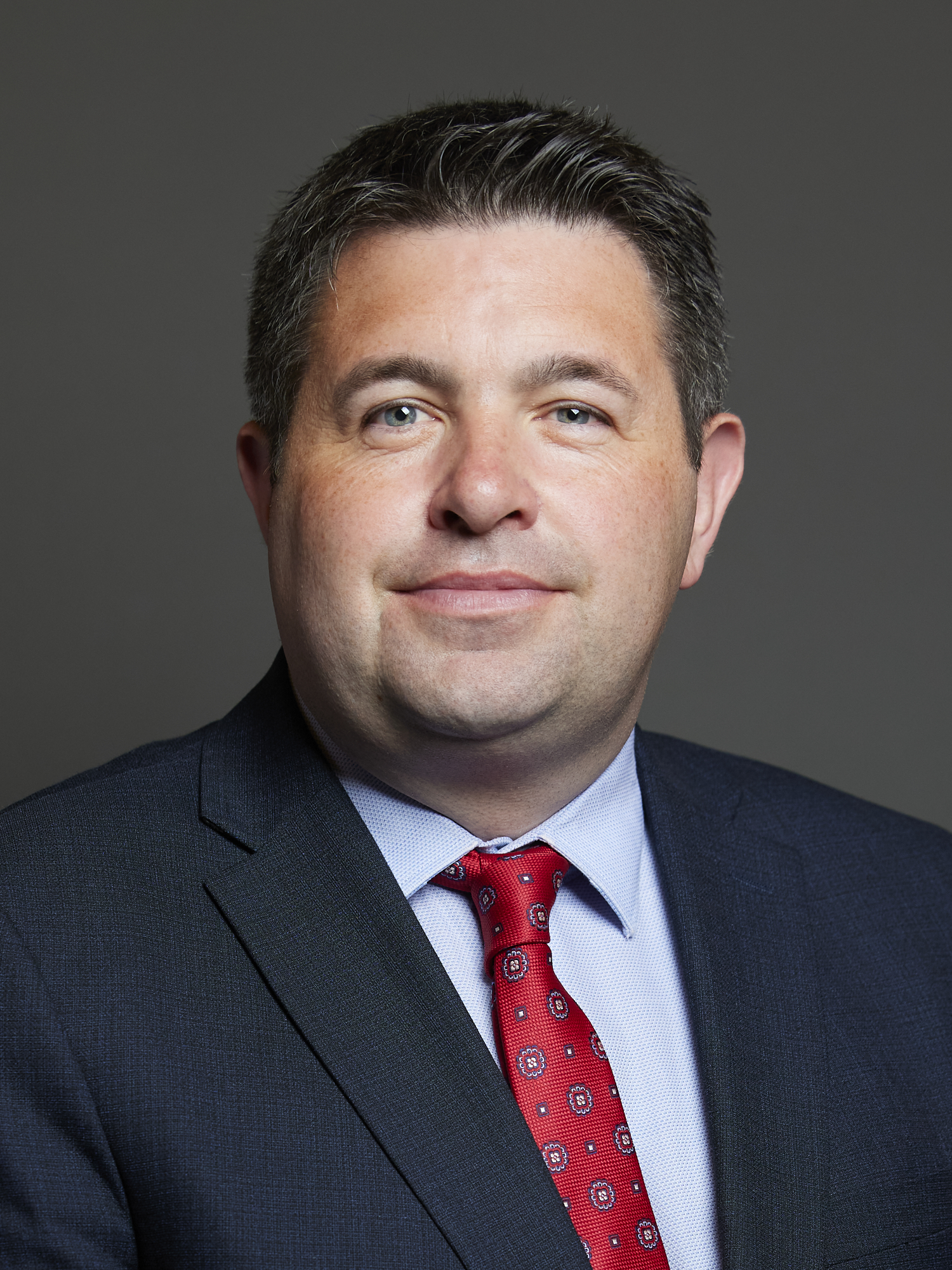

	First party	Second party
Leader	Shaun Davies	Andrew Eade
Party	Labour	Conservative
Last election	36 seats, 47.6%	13 seats, 37.4%
Seats before	35 (Note: Including one vacant seat in Hadley and Leegomery ward previously held by Labour councillor Leon Murray until his death in January 2023.)	13
Seats won	38	8
Seat change	▲2	▼5
Popular vote	42,724	21,671
Percentage	52.8%	26.8%
Swing	▲5.2%	▼10.6%
	Third party	Fourth party
Leader	Bill Tomlinson
Party	Liberal Democrats	Independent
Last election	4 seats, 7.3%	1 seat, 4.7%
Seats before	4	2
Seats won	6	2
Seat change	▲2	▲1
Popular vote	7,617	7,242
Percentage	9.4%	8.9%
Swing	▲2.1%	▲4.2%
- Winner of each seat at the 2023 Telford and Wrekin Council election
Leader before election
Shaun Davies
Labour
Leader after election
Shaun Davies
Labour

The 2023 Telford and Wrekin Council election took place on 4 May 2023 to elect members of Telford and Wrekin Council in Shropshire, England. This was on the same day as other local elections across England. New ward boundaries came into effect for this election, but the number of seats remained the same at 54.

Labour increased its majority on the council at the election.

== Summary ==
=== Election result ===
2023 Telford and Wrekin Council election
Party	Candidates	Seats	Gains	Losses	Net gain/loss	Seats %	Votes %	Votes	+/−
Labour	54	38	2	0	▲2	70.4	52.8	42,724	+5.2
Conservative	54	8	0	4	▼5	14.8	26.8	21,671	–10.6
Liberal Democrats	27	6	1	0	▲2	11.1	9.4	7,617	+2.1
Independent	24	2	1	0	▲1	3.7	8.9	7,242	+4.2
Green	13	0	0	0	Steady	0.0	2.0	1,613	+1.7
Libertarian	1	0	0	0	Steady	0.0	0.1	60	New

== Ward results ==
The Statement of Persons Nominated, which details the candidates standing in each ward, was released by Telford and Wrekin Council following the close of nominations on 5 April 2023. The results were as follows, with an asterisk (*) indicating an incumbent councillor standing for re-election.

=== Admaston & Bratton ===
Admaston & Bratton
Party	Candidate	Votes	%	±%
Liberal Democrats	Kim Tonks	594	52.8	+34.6
Conservative	Becky Eade	376	33.4	−26.4
Labour	Bill McClements	137	12.2	−10.0
Green	Thomas Hayek	19	1.7	N/A
Majority		218	19.4	N/A
Turnout		1,128	46.7	+13.0
Rejected ballots		2	0.2	
Registered electors		2,416		
Liberal Democrats gain from Conservative		Swing		

=== Apley Castle ===
Apley Castle
Party	Candidate	Votes	%	±%
Liberal Democrats	Karen Blundell*	696	64.3	+5.2
Conservative	Andrew Benion	199	18.4	−5.5
Labour	Usman Ahmed	187	17.3	+0.4
Majority		497	45.9	N/A
Turnout		1,085	45.5	+2.0
Rejected ballots		3	0.3	
Registered electors		2,386		
Liberal Democrats hold		Swing		

=== Arleston & College ===
Arleston & College (2 seats)
Party	Candidate	Votes	%	±%
Labour	Lee Carter*	1,281	71.8	N/A
Labour	Angela McClements*	1,244	69.7	N/A
Conservative	Philip Morris-Jones	324	18.2	N/A
Conservative	Jeremy Good	282	15.8	N/A
Green	Bev McCarthy	183	10.3	N/A
Turnout		1,804	37.0	N/A
Rejected ballots		19	1.1	
Registered electors		4,879		
Labour win (new seat)				
Labour win (new seat)				

=== Brookside ===
Brookside
Party	Candidate	Votes	%	±%
Labour	Arnold England*	488	74.5	+35.7
Conservative	Robert Burnett	95	14.5	−11.0
Independent	Greg Sinclair	72	11.0	N/A
Majority		393	60.0	N/A
Turnout		655	22.9	−9.6
Rejected ballots		0	0.0	
Registered electors		2,861		
Labour hold		Swing		

=== Church Aston & Lilleshall ===
Church Aston & Lilleshall
Party	Candidate	Votes	%	±%
Conservative	Andrew Eade*	719	64.0	−6.0
Labour	Lynda Broughton	263	23.4	+12.5
Liberal Democrats	Sally Wiggin	142	12.6	−6.5
Majority		456	40.6	N/A
Turnout		1,125	44.9	+3.7
Rejected ballots		1	0.1	
Registered electors		2,506		
Conservative hold		Swing		

=== Dawley & Aqueduct ===
Dawley & Aqueduct (2 seats)
Party	Candidate	Votes	%	±%
Labour	Andy Burford*	1,002	63.5	
Labour	Lyndsey Parker	822	52.1	
Conservative	Martin Vickers	300	19.0	
Independent	Sam Deakin	275	17.4	
Conservative	Michael Carline	273	17.3	
Green	John Adams	124	7.9	
Liberal Democrats	Alison Cheshire	106	6.7	
Turnout		1,595	30.2	
Rejected ballots		16	1.0	
Registered electors		5,284		
Labour hold				
Labour hold				

=== Donnington ===
Donnington (2 seats)
Party	Candidate	Votes	%	±%
Labour	Fiona Doran	774	49.7	
Labour	Ollie Vickers	720	46.2	
Conservative	Jay Gough	706	45.3	
Conservative	Thomas Hoof	645	41.4	
Green	Ross Minton	117	7.5	
Turnout		1,562	27.7	
Rejected ballots		5	0.3	
Registered electors		5,634		
Labour hold				
Labour hold				

=== Edgmond ===
Edgmond
Party	Candidate	Votes	%	±%
Conservative	Stephen Burrell*	600	62.6	
Labour	Simon Lord	263	27.4	
Liberal Democrats	Nick Collier	96	10.0	
Majority		337	35.1	
Turnout		962	41.8	
Rejected ballots		3	0.3	
Registered electors		2,299		
Conservative win (new seat)				

=== Ercall ===
Ercall
Party	Candidate	Votes	%	±%
Labour	Giles Luter	671	54.6	
Conservative	Miles Hosken*	487	39.6	
Green	Pat McCarthy	72	5.9	
Majority		184	15.0	
Turnout		1,236	51.7	
Rejected ballots		6	0.5	
Registered electors		2,390		
Labour gain from Conservative		Swing		

=== Ercall Magna ===
Ercall Magna
Party	Candidate	Votes	%	±%
Conservative	Stephen Bentley*	604	59.6	
Liberal Democrats	Thomas Baker	291	28.7	
Labour	Gemma Davis	119	11.7	
Majority		313	30.9	
Turnout		1,027	38.6	
Rejected ballots		13	1.3	
Registered electors		2,662		
Conservative win (new seat)				

=== Hadley & Leegomery ===
Hadley & Leegomery (3 seats)
Party	Candidate	Votes	%	±%
Labour	Gemma Offland*	1,337	58.2	
Labour	Eileen Callear*	1,305	56.8	
Labour	Amrik Jhawar*	1,242	54.1	
Independent	Julie Kaur	487	21.2	
Independent	Lesley Savage	402	17.5	
Independent	Paul Savage	384	16.7	
Conservative	Brett Murray	343	14.9	
Conservative	Kevin Hall	328	14.3	
Conservative	Naz Younas	298	13.0	
Green	Toby Poulsom	175	7.6	
Turnout		2,306	30.9	
Rejected ballots		10	0.4	
Registered electors		7,461		
Labour hold				
Labour hold				
Labour hold				

=== Haygate & Park ===
Haygate & Park (2 seats)
Party	Candidate	Votes	%	±%
Labour	Graham Cook*	1,092	57.0	
Labour	Paul Davis	1,031	53.8	
Conservative	Sylvia Hall	614	32.0	
Conservative	Stuart Parr	509	26.6	
Independent	Tim Wills	186	9.7	
Liberal Democrats	Pat Fairclough	173	9.0	
Turnout		1,927	36.2	
Rejected ballots		11	0.6	
Registered electors		5,329		
Labour win (new seat)				
Labour win (new seat)				

=== Horsehay & Lightmoor ===
Horsehay & Lightmoor (2 seats)
Party	Candidate	Votes	%	±%
Labour	Ian Preece	931	61.3	
Labour	Raj Mehta*	830	54.6	
Independent	Kate Barnes	387	25.5	
Independent	Steve Barnes	293	19.3	
Conservative	Rupal Karpe	160	10.5	
Conservative	Tayisiya Lawrence	157	10.3	
Liberal Democrats	Archie Barnett	105	6.9	
Turnout		1,525	31.7	
Rejected ballots		5	0.3	
Registered electors		4,809		
Labour gain from Conservative				
Labour hold				

=== Ironbridge Gorge ===
Ironbridge Gorge
Party	Candidate	Votes	%	±%
Labour	Carolyn Healy*	848	80.4	
Conservative	Harvey Mitchell	129	12.2	
Green	Bridget Irving	57	5.4	
Liberal Democrats	Debbie Miller	20	1.9	
Majority		719	68.2	
Turnout		1,055	45.2	
Rejected ballots		0	0.0	
Registered electors		2,332		
Labour hold		Swing		

=== Ketley ===
Ketley
Party	Candidate	Votes	%	±%
Labour	Ranbir Sahota	454	52.5	
Conservative	Joy Francis	281	32.5	
Independent	Andrew Morris	129	14.9	
Majority		173	20.0	
Turnout		870	32.9	
Rejected ballots		6	0.7	
Registered electors		2,646		
Labour win (new seat)				

=== Lawley ===
Lawley (3 seats)
Party	Candidate	Votes	%	±%
Labour	Zona Hannington	697	46.3	
Labour	Luke Lewis	690	45.8	
Labour	Erin Aston	664	44.1	
Liberal Democrats	Cathy Salter	486	32.2	
Conservative	Mike Francis	300	19.9	
Liberal Democrats	David Goodall	285	18.9	
Liberal Democrats	William Lowe	276	18.3	
Conservative	Hamish Toon	229	15.2	
Conservative	Susan Toon	242	16.1	
Independent	Jackie Yorke	207	13.7	
Independent	John Yorke	165	10.9	
Turnout		1,513	26.9	
Rejected ballots		6	0.4	
Registered electors		5,618		
Labour win (new seat)				
Labour win (new seat)				
Labour win (new seat)				

=== Madeley & Sutton Hill ===
Madeley & Sutton Hill (3 seats)
Party	Candidate	Votes	%	±%
Labour	Paul Watling*	1,486	62.9	
Labour	Janice Jones*	1,435	60.8	
Labour	Derek White*	1,397	59.1	
Conservative	Lisa Dugmore	582	24.6	
Conservative	Eric Bennett	551	23.3	
Conservative	Dorothy Roberts	505	21.4	
Liberal Democrats	Paul Howard	296	12.5	
Green	David Page	254	10.8	
Turnout		2,367	31.7	
Rejected ballots		5	0.2	
Registered electors		7,457		
Labour hold				
Labour hold				
Labour hold				

=== Malinslee & Dawley Bank ===
Malinslee & Dawley Bank (2 seats)
Party	Candidate	Votes	%	±%
Labour	Shaun Davies*	1,183	76.5	
Labour	Elise Davies	1,089	70.4	
Conservative	Samantha Smith	282	18.2	
Conservative	Pauline Jackson	253	16.4	
Liberal Democrats	Patrick Doody	110	7.1	
Turnout		1,554	28.8	
Rejected ballots		7	0.5	
Registered electors		5,396		
Labour hold				
Labour hold				

=== Muxton ===
Muxton (2 seats)
Party	Candidate	Votes	%	±%
Independent	Jenny Urey	618	40.5	
Conservative	Nigel Dugmore*	546	35.8	
Independent	Iain Alexander	535	35.1	
Conservative	Adrian Lawrence*	466	30.6	
Labour	Andrew Harrison	342	22.4	
Labour	Michael Rowe	320	21.0	
Liberal Democrats	Ben Eaton	83	5.4	
Turnout		1,535	34.1	
Rejected ballots		10	0.7	
Registered electors		4,498		
Independent gain from Conservative				
Conservative hold				

=== Newport East ===
Newport East
Party	Candidate	Votes	%	±%
Liberal Democrats	Sarah Syrda	483	51.9	
Conservative	Rodney Pitt	237	25.5	
Labour	Heather Brennan	211	22.7	
Majority		246	26.4	
Turnout		943	40.0	
Rejected ballots		12	1.3	
Registered electors		2,360		
Liberal Democrats win (new seat)				

=== Newport North ===
Newport North
Party	Candidate	Votes	%	±%
Conservative	Tim Nelson*	580	50.7	
Liberal Democrats	Mark Wiggin	378	33.1	
Labour	Matt Lamb	185	16.2	
Majority		202	17.7	
Turnout		1,146	45.4	
Rejected ballots		3	0.3	
Registered electors		2,527		
Conservative win (new seat)				

=== Newport South ===
Newport South
Party	Candidate	Votes	%	±%
Liberal Democrats	Thomas Janke*	381	48.8	
Conservative	Eric Carter*	278	35.6	
Labour	Rachel Keen	122	15.6	
Majority		103	13.2	
Turnout		782	38.1	
Rejected ballots		1	0.1	
Registered electors		2,050		
Liberal Democrats win (new seat)				

=== Newport West ===
Newport West
Party	Candidate	Votes	%	±%
Independent	Peter Scott*	639	66.5	
Conservative	Bill Harper	146	15.2	
Labour	Tom King	147	15.3	
Liberal Democrats	Martyn Jobe	29	3.0	
Majority		492	51.2	
Turnout		964	36.9	
Rejected ballots		3	0.3	
Registered electors		2,615		
Independent win (new seat)				

=== Oakengates & Ketley Bank ===
Oakengates & Ketley Bank (3 seats)
Party	Candidate	Votes	%	±%
Labour	Steve Reynolds*	1,201	53.7	
Labour	Hilda Rhodes*	1,201	53.7	
Labour	Gilly Latham-Reynolds*	1,135	50.7	
Conservative	Christine Orford	521	23.3	
Conservative	Leanne Maddy	518	23.1	
Conservative	Adam Karakulah	428	19.1	
Independent	Dave Poole	314	14.0	
Independent	Claire McKeown	279	12.5	
Independent	Katie Woodland	263	11.8	
Independent	Sarah Williams	237	10.6	
Independent	Dan Williams	203	9.1	
Turnout		2,261	29.1	
Rejected ballots		23	1.0	
Registered electors		7,773		
Labour hold				
Labour hold				
Labour hold				

=== Overdale & The Rock ===
Overdale & The Rock
Party	Candidate	Votes	%	±%
Labour	Mark Boylan*	423	56.9	
Conservative	Rob Binks	214	28.8	
Liberal Democrats	David Schultz	54	7.3	
Green	Mark Webster	52	7.0	
Majority		209	28.1	
Turnout		746	28.8	
Rejected ballots		3	0.4	
Registered electors		2,593		
Labour win (new seat)				

=== Priorslee ===
Priorslee (2 seats)
Party	Candidate	Votes	%	±%
Conservative	David Thomas	1,023	53.3	
Conservative	Rachael Tyrrell	959	50.0	
Labour	Gurdip Singh	788	41.1	
Labour	Rae Evans	639	33.3	
Green	Mike White	117	6.1	
Liberal Democrats	Jack Ashington-Carter	77	4.0	
Liberal Democrats	David Ellams	73	3.8	
Turnout		1,933	41.6	
Rejected ballots		15	0.8	
Registered electors		4,644		
Conservative hold				
Conservative hold				

=== Shawbirch & Dothill ===
Shawbirch & Dothill (2 seats)
Party	Candidate	Votes	%	±%
Liberal Democrats	Karen Tomlinson*	1,048	60.0	
Liberal Democrats	Bill Tomlinson*	993	56.8	
Labour	Jim McGinn	370	21.2	
Conservative	Chelsea Benion	336	19.2	
Labour	Stuart Williams	317	18.1	
Conservative	Charlie Ensor	295	16.9	
Turnout		1,758	40.7	
Rejected ballots		10	0.6	
Registered electors		4,319		
Liberal Democrats win (new seat)				
Liberal Democrats win (new seat)				

=== St Georges ===
St Georges (2 seats)
Party	Candidate	Votes	%	±%
Labour	Richard Overton*	951	60.7	
Labour	Stephen Handley	926	59.1	
Conservative	Alan Adams	444	28.4	
Conservative	Nina Kelly-Triplett	433	27.7	
Green	Barry Mitchell	158	10.1	
Libertarian	Sam Rhodes-Hodgkiss	60	3.8	
Turnout		1,571	30.6	
Rejected ballots		5	0.3	
Registered electors		5,142		
Labour hold				
Labour hold				

=== The Nedge ===
The Nedge (3 seats)
Party	Candidate	Votes	%	±%
Labour	Nathan England*	1,375	56.2	
Labour	Chris Turley*	1,280	52.3	
Labour	Leanne Powers	1,224	50.0	
Conservative	Barbara Street	532	21.7	
Conservative	Mike Street	513	21.0	
Conservative	Vladislav Gradinari	423	17.3	
Independent	Connor Furnival	318	13.0	
Independent	Tammy Wood	286	11.7	
Independent	Adrian Watkin	270	11.0	
Green	Charlotte Creen	224	9.2	
Liberal Democrats	Paul Bryant	215	8.8	
Independent	Sophia Vaughan-Hodkinson	147	6.0	
Turnout		2,460	30.2	
Rejected ballots		12	0.5	
Registered electors		8,149		
Labour hold				
Labour hold				
Labour hold				

=== Woodside ===
Woodside (2 seats)
Party	Candidate	Votes	%	±%
Labour	Kelly Middleton*	765	75.1	
Labour	Helena Morgan	722	70.9	
Conservative	Graham Blower	189	18.5	
Conservative	Jacqueline Seymour*	180	17.7	
Liberal Democrats	Robert Salter	83	8.1	
Turnout		1,023	21.2	
Rejected ballots		4	0.4	
Registered electors		4,815		
Labour hold				
Labour hold				

=== Wrockwardine ===
Wrockwardine
Party	Candidate	Votes	%	±%
Conservative	Gareth Thomas	476	48.6	
Labour	Joan Gorse	252	25.7	
Independent	Martin Holyoake	146	14.9	
Green	Rebecca Owen	61	6.2	
Liberal Democrats	Josh Tomlinson	44	4.5	
Majority		224	22.9	
Turnout		988	43.6	
Rejected ballots		9	0.9	
Registered electors		2,265		
Conservative hold		Swing		

=== Wrockwardine Wood & Trench ===
Wrockwardine Wood & Trench (2 seats)
Party	Candidate	Votes	%	±%
Labour	Shirley Reynolds*	1,098	74.5	
Labour	John Thompson	1,048	71.1	
Conservative	Lucinda Rich	303	20.6	
Conservative	Anzelika Kondrasova	258	17.5	
Turnout		1,480	32.1	
Rejected ballots		6	0.4	
Registered electors		4,613		
Labour hold				
Labour hold				

== Changes 2023–2027 ==
- Richard Overton (St Georges), elected as a Labour councillor, now sits as an independent.

=== By-elections ===
==== The Nedge (June 2024) ====
A by-election was held on 6 June 2024 to fill a vacancy in The Nedge ward. Labour held the seat.

The Nedge by-election: 6 June 2024
Party	Candidate	Votes	%	±%
Labour	Corrine Chikandamina	971	54.4	–0.8
Conservative	Richard Tyrrell	464	26.0	+4.7
Liberal Democrats	Paul Bryant	175	9.8	+1.2
Independent	Sophia Vaughan-Hodkinson	175	9.8	+3.9
Majority		507	28.4	N/A
Turnout		1,794	21.5	–8.7
Rejected ballots		9	0.5	
Registered electors		8,346		
Labour hold		Swing	▼2.8	

==== Hadley & Leegomery ====
A by-election was held on 14 November 2024 to fill a vacancy in Hadley & Leegomery ward. Labour held the seat.

Hadley & Leegomery by-election: 14 November 2024
Party	Candidate	Votes	%	±%
Labour	Julie Kaur	778	45.3	–11.8
Conservative	Stuart Parr	539	31.4	+16.8
Reform	Robert Leah	274	15.9	N/A
Green	Mark Webster	75	4.4	–3.1
Liberal Democrats	Tarlochan Singh Aujla	53	3.1	N/A
Majority		239	13.9	N/A
Turnout		1,734	22.1	
Rejected ballots		15	0.9	
Registered electors		7,844		
Labour hold		Swing	▼14.3	

==== The Nedge (November 2024) ====
A by-election was held on 14 November 2024 after the death of Labour councillor Chris Turley. Labour held the seat.

The Nedge by-election: 14 November 2024
Party	Candidate	Votes	%	±%
Labour	Nathalie Page	636	33.8	–17.8
Conservative	Tom Wust	620	33.0	+13.0
Reform	Greg Sinclair	427	22.7	N/A
Green	John Adams	84	4.5	–3.9
Independent	Sophia Vaughan-Hodkinson	61	3.2	N/A
Liberal Democrats	Milan Thakur	53	2.8	–5.3
Majority		16	0.8	N/A
Turnout		1,887	22.0	
Rejected ballots		6	0.3	
Registered electors		8,564		
Labour hold		Swing	▼15.4	

==== Malinslee & Dawley Bank ====
A by-election was held on 2 July 2026 after Labour councillor Shaun Davies resigned following his appointment as a government whip. Labour held the seat.

Malinslee & Dawley Bank by-election, 2 July 2026
Party	Candidate	Votes	%	±%
Labour	Ben Carter	590	42.9	−32.2
Reform	Doug Halsall	569	41.4	+41.4
Conservative	Thomas Hoof	104	7.6	−10.3
Green	Jazz Holmes	76	5.5	+5.5
Liberal Democrats	Patrick Doody	35	2.5	−4.4
Majority		21	1.5	−30.7
Turnout		1,375	24.2	
Rejected ballots		1	0.1	
Registered electors		5,671		
Labour hold		Swing		
