= Lucy Allan (politician) =

British politician (born 1964)

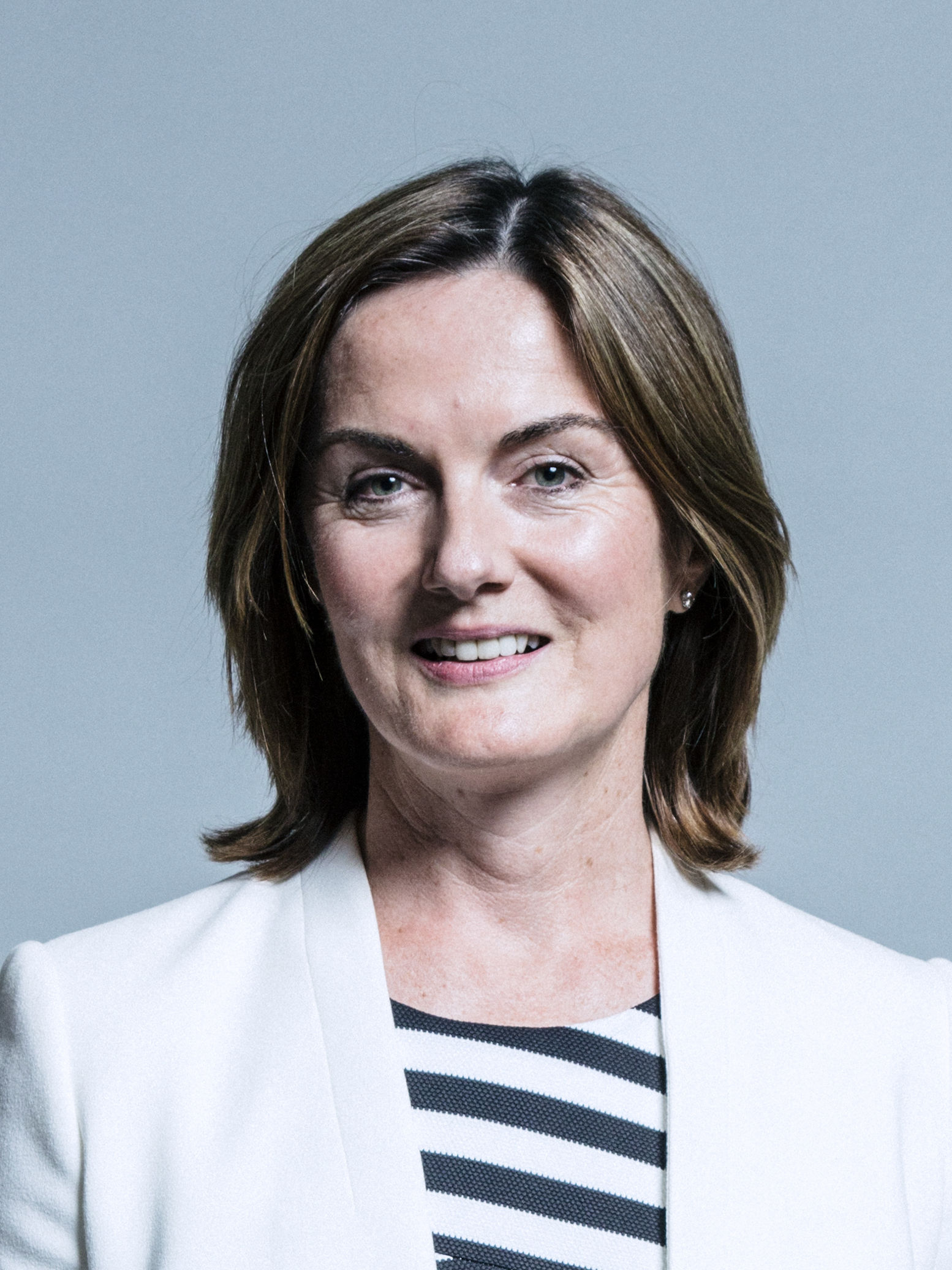
- Official portrait, 2017

Member of Parliament for Telford
- In office 7 May 2015 – 30 May 2024
- Preceded by: David Wright
- Succeeded by: Shaun Davies

Personal details
- Born: Lucy Elizabeth Allan; 2 October 1964 (age 61) Cheltenham, Gloucestershire, England
- Party: Reform UK (since 2024)
- Other political affiliations: Conservative (until 2024)
- Children: 1
- Education: Durham University; Kingston University
- Occupation: Politician
- Website: lucyallan.com (Defunct)

Lucy Elizabeth Allan (born 2 October 1964) is a British politician who served as the member of Parliament (MP) for Telford from the 2015 general election, until standing down at the 2024 general election.

In 2015, Allan became the first Conservative MP, as well as the first female MP, to represent the Telford constituency. She was re-elected at the 2017 and 2019 general elections. She served as the Parliamentary Private Secretary to the Leader of the House of Commons, Jacob Rees-Mogg, from 2020 to 2022. In November 2021, she was appointed to the Health and Social Care Select Committee.

In May 2024, 3 days before the end of her term, Allan was suspended from the Conservative Party for publicly supporting the Reform UK candidate for Telford, Alan Adams.

== Early life and career ==
Lucy Allan was born in Cheltenham on 2 October 1964, the daughter of a farmer and a teacher, and grew up near Totnes, Devon. She is related to the Scottish radical socialist suffragette Janie Allan, whose family owned the Allan Line shipping company.

Allan was educated at Durham University and Kingston Law School. She has a degree in anthropology and a master's degree in employment law.

She joined Price Waterhouse as a trainee in 1987, where she qualified as a Chartered Accountant and specialised in business turnaround, and in 1994 she further qualified as a Chartered Secretary in the Institute of Chartered Secretaries and Administrators.

In 1994, she moved into investment management, reaching director level, working for UBS Warburg, Gartmore Investment, De La Rue, Mercury Asset Management and First State Investments. While Head of Investment Trusts at First State Investments, which ran the Scottish American Investment Company (SAINTS) and Scottish Oriental Smaller Companies Trust, she was suspended in September 2003 over alleged plagiarism in statements issued by SAINTS. She was made redundant in January 2004, after First State Investments ceased to manage SAINTS.

In 2004, Allan began a master's degree in employment law and set up her employment law consultancy, specialising in discrimination and maternity issues. She became a non-executive director of Wandsworth NHS primary care trust in 2009 and resigned in 2010. She has served as an employment tribunal panellist.

== Political career ==
Allan was elected as a local councillor to Wandsworth London Borough Council in 2006, representing the Southfields ward, and served until 2012.

In March 2013, she was selected as the Conservative Party parliamentary candidate to contest the marginal constituency of Telford in the 2015 general election. She advocated a direct rail link to London from the town and aimed to tackle the high rate of youth unemployment in Telford.

=== Family First Campaign ===
After Allan made a visit to her GP seeking help with symptoms of depression following a family bereavement in 2010, Wandsworth Council launched a child protection investigation, claiming Allan's 10-year-old son was at risk of significant harm. In the wake of the controversy which followed, Allan stood down from the council, and from her directorship with the NHS. In 2011, following legal action by Allan, social services decided to take no further action.

Based on her family's experience, she founded Family First Group, a lobby group which campaigns to reduce the number of children in state care, for improvements to the UK child protection system and support for families affected by it.

In 2012 Allan fronted a media campaign on child protection injustice, which included an appearance on ITV's This Morning. She participated in an edition of ITV's Exposure documentary series on this subject on 15 July 2014, Don't Take My Child.

=== Allegations of bullying staff ===
In December 2015 Allan was accused of bullying members of staff, and leaving a series of voicemail messages to a sick employee allegedly including a threat of dismissal. On 21 December 2015, a statement about the allegations was published on Allan's website but deleted later in the day. The statement apologised for Allan's voicemail messages, which were publicly released, but stated the bullying allegations were unfounded and was critical of a former employee; the London Evening Standard characterised the statement as "a long rebuttal". Later in January 2016, Allan acknowledged sending the voicemails was "stupid" and she regretted shouting at the employee, but denied her actions amounted to bullying.

=== Advancing "libertarian agenda" ===
In January 2016 Allan stated that on national issues her approach in general is to advance within parliament the "libertarian agenda", to prevent the increasing influence of the state. For example, she was against a sugar tax that was under consideration by her party. Allan voted to leave the EU in the June 2016 referendum.

In June 2016 Allan introduced a private member's bill to repeal provisions in the Counter-Terrorism and Security Act 2015 to require staff to report possible signs of extremism or radicalisation amongst primary and nursery school aged children, following a number of high-profile cases where the provision was inappropriately used in relation the government's Prevent strategy.

=== European Union ===
Allan is a supporter of Brexit, and argued that the country needed to be prepared for a no-deal Brexit if necessary. In April 2019, Allan welcomed the "fantastic" candidates from the Brexit Party ahead of that year's European elections. She defended the comment after being criticised by some Conservative loyalists, saying that party loyalties would be "eclipsed" by the Brexit issue at the ballot box.

=== Social media ===
In December 2015 Allan posted on Facebook an email she said she received from a constituent; the email was edited and ended with the words "unless you die". Allan later acknowledged that she had added those words to the email (saying she had taken them from a different email), leading to accusations of her faking a death threat. Allan temporarily deactivated her Facebook and Twitter accounts following the incident. Allan later apologised for creating a "misleading impression", and said the controversy was not about her use of social media, but due to "activists unhappy they didn't get the MP they wanted".

On 14 May 2020, Allan was criticised after she retweeted a doctored video from a far-right Twitter account which falsely claimed that Labour leader Sir Keir Starmer obstructed the prosecution of grooming gangs while he served as Director of Public Prosecutions. Allan was reprimanded for her actions by Conservative whips.

=== General Election 2024 ===
In May 2024, Allan was suspended from the Conservative Party for publicly supporting the Reform UK candidate for Telford, Alan Adams; Allan resigned from the party the same day. On 29 May 2024, it was reported that she was considering standing as a Reform UK candidate.

== Personal life ==
Allan is married to a stockbroker and has a son. They live in Southfields, Wandsworth. Allan also had a constituency house in Oakengates, Telford.

Parliament of the United Kingdom
Preceded by David Wright	Member of Parliament for Telford; 2015–2024	Succeeded by Shaun Davies
