= Shaun Davies (politician) =

British politician

Shaun Davies MP
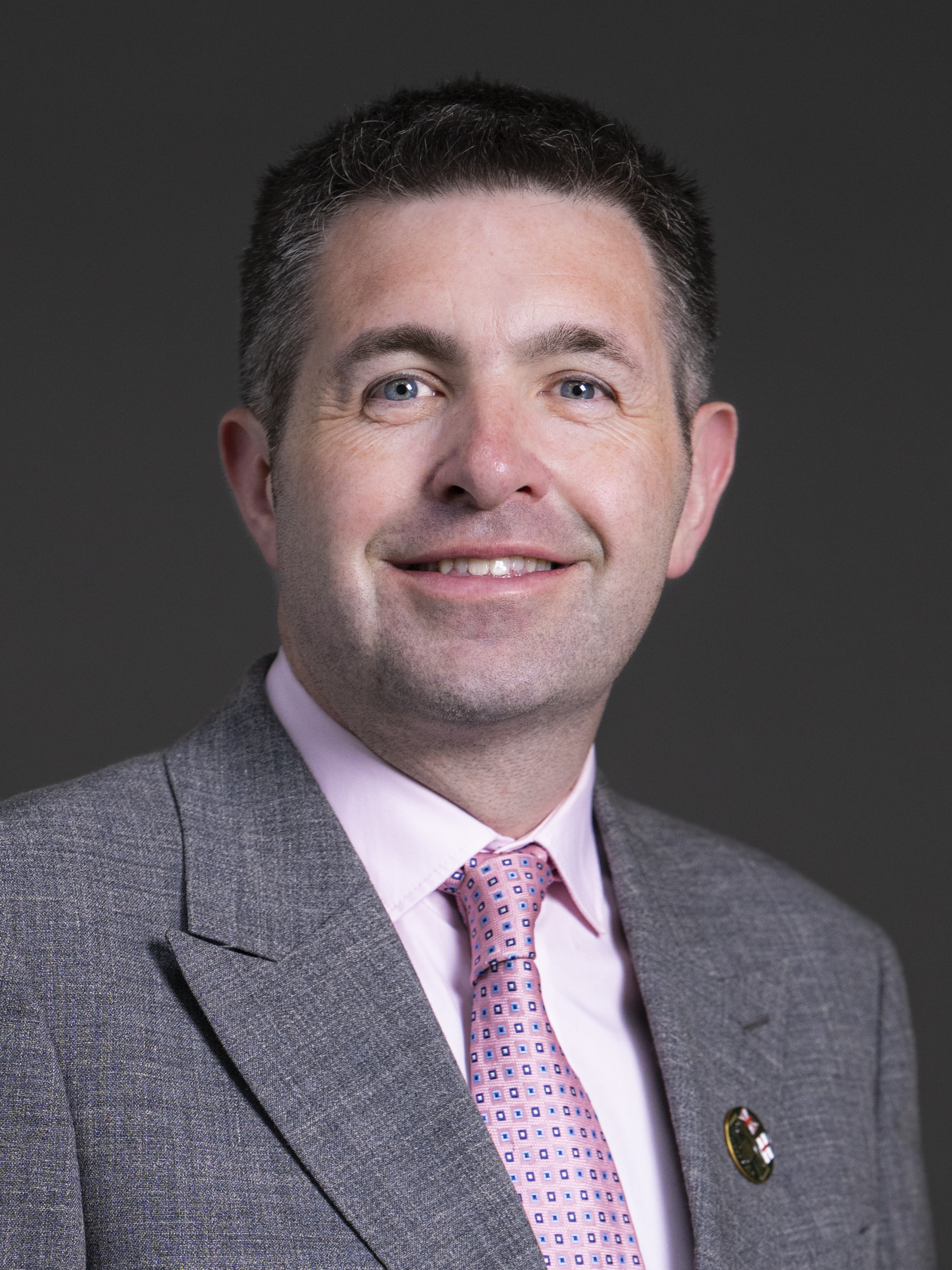
- Official portrait, 2026

Lord Commissioner of the Treasury
- Incumbent
- Assumed office 22 July 2026
- Prime Minister: Andy Burnham

Assistant Whip, House of Commons
- In office 12 May 2026 – 22 July 2026
- Prime Minister: Keir Starmer

Member of Parliament for Telford
- Incumbent
- Assumed office 4 July 2024
- Preceded by: Lucy Allan
- Majority: 8,102 (19.9%)

Leader of the Labour Group of the Local Government Association
- In office 10 June 2022 – 4 July 2024
- Preceded by: Nick Forbes
- Succeeded by: Bev Craig

Chair of the Local Government Association
- In office 4 July 2023 – 4 July 2024
- Preceded by: James Jamieson, Baron Jamieson
- Succeeded by: Louise Gittins

Leader of Telford and Wrekin Council
- In office 26 May 2016 – 18 July 2024
- Preceded by: Kuldip Sahota
- Succeeded by: Lee Carter

Personal details
- Born: 26 April 1986 (age 40)
- Party: Labour
- Education: Aberystwyth University; University of Staffordshire

Shaun Davies (born 26 April 1986) is a British Labour Party politician who has been the Member of Parliament for Telford since 2024. He gained the seat from the Conservatives.

== Early life ==
In his maiden speech in Parliament, Shaun Davies spoke about his experiences of poverty as a child in Telford, Shropshire. He spoke of turning the lights off and hiding from debt collectors in his home, and of receiving free school meals. He lived with his grandmother from the age of 11.

Davies attended local schools in Telford, before graduating from Aberystwyth University with a law degree. He later studied for a Master's Degree at the University of Staffordshire, before qualifying as a solicitor.

== Local government career ==
Davies held numerous local government roles prior to his election to Parliament. He was elected first to Telford and Wrekin Council in 2011 and in 2016, he became the youngest council leader in the country, aged 30, and led Telford and Wrekin Council until July 2024, when he resigned to become a Member of Parliament.

He was Leader of Labour in Local Government from 2022 to 2023, in this role he attended the Shadow Cabinet of the Labour opposition. When Labour become the largest party in Local Government he was the party nominee to become Chair of the LGA. At the time of taking the Chair he became the youngest ever Chair (and Labour's first chair in almost a decade) of the Local Government Association in 2023.

== Parliamentary career ==
Shortly after being elected as an MP, Davies was appointed as parliamentary private secretary to Baroness Smith of Basildon, Leader of the House of Lords. However, in September 2024 he resigned this position, in order to stand for Chair of the Housing, Communities and Local Government Select Committee. He was unsuccessful, losing to Florence Eshalomi. In October 2024, he was elected as a member of the Home Affairs Select Committee.

In November 2024, Davies voted in favour of the Terminally Ill Adults (End of Life) Bill, which proposes to legalise assisted suicide.

He was formerly Chair of the West Midlands All-Party Parliamentary Group and the All-Party Parliamentary Group for Events.

On 15 July 2025, he was listed by LabourList as being a member of the Labour Growth Group and the Get Britain Working Group of Labour MPs.

In the 2025 British cabinet reshuffle, he was appointed Private Parliamentary Secretary to the Defence Secretary.

On 12 May 2026, he was appointed as an Assistant Whip, House of Commons. In the Cabinet reshuffle following Andy Burnham's ascension to Prime Minister in July 2026, he was promoted to the role of Junior Lord of the Treasury (Government Whip).

== Personal life ==
Shaun Davies married his wife Elise in 2017. Davies is a father and stepfather to three children.

Davies is a Manchester United fan.
