= Kuldip Sahota, Baron Sahota =

British politician (born 1951)

The Right Honourable The Lord Sahota
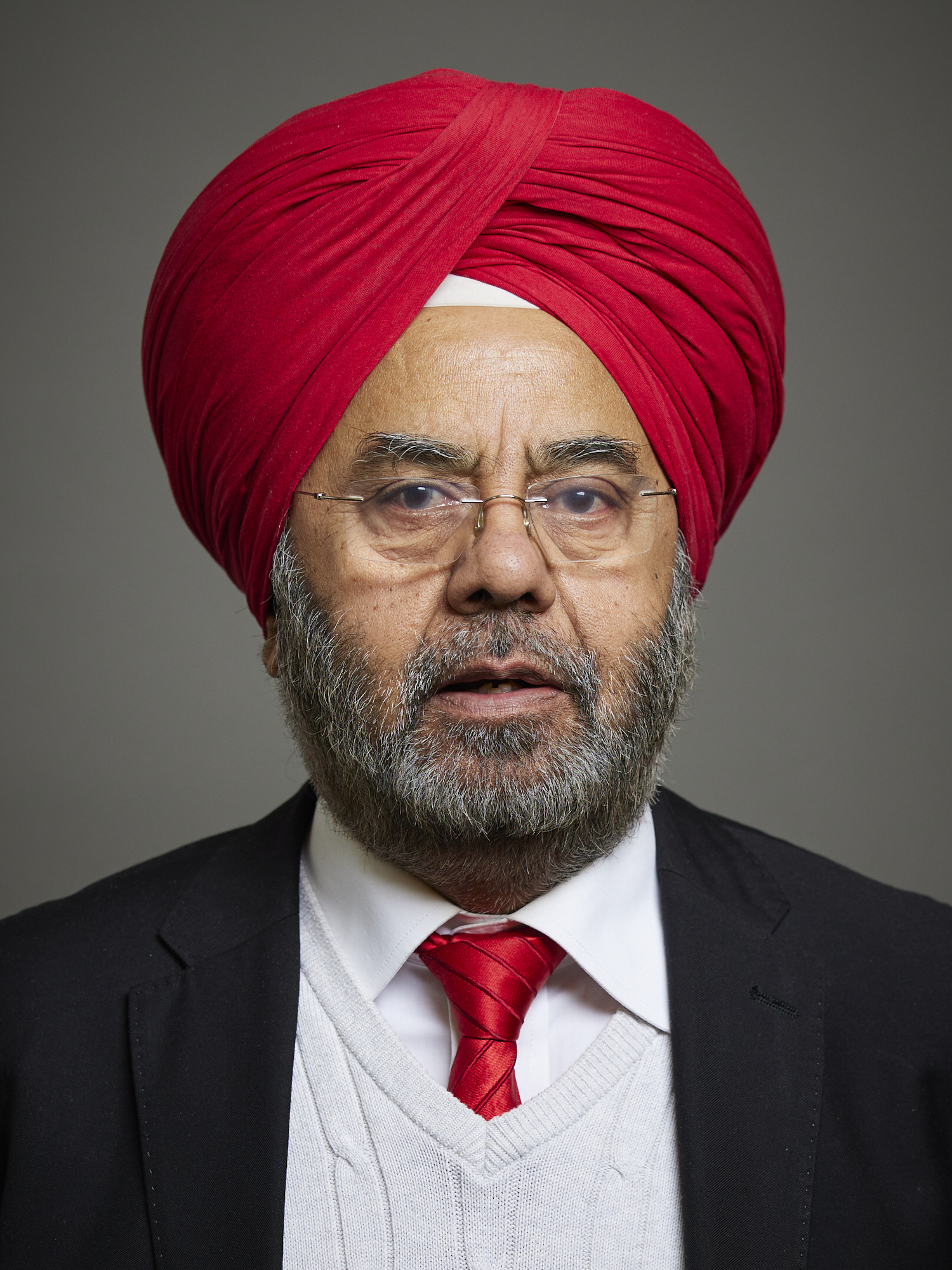
- Official portrait, 2023

Member of the House of Lords
- Lord Temporal
- Life peerage 2 November 2022

Personal details
- Born: Kuldip Singh Sahota; 2 May 1951 (age 75) India
- Party: Labour
- Children: 2
- Website: Official website

Kuldip Singh Sahota, Baron Sahota (born 2 May 1951), is a British Labour Party politician and life peer.

Sahota was born in India of Sikh Punjabi heritage, the son of a foundry worker who emigrated to England in 1957; he joined his father in 1966. Sahota worked for 15 years at the factory of GKN Sankey in Telford before going into full-time political work and going into private business.

Sahota, who had been active in his trade union at work in industry, was elected as a Labour councillor for Malinslee and Dawley Bank on Telford and Wrekin Council, serving from 2001 to 2023. He served as the leader of the council between 2011 and 2016.

Sahota stood as the Labour Party candidate for Telford at the 2017 general election, losing to Conservative incumbent Lucy Allan by a narrow margin of 720 votes. He was then the Labour candidate for Ludlow at the 2019 general election. In November 2019, at a hustings held in Church Stretton, Conservative candidate and incumbent MP Philip Dunne told Sahota that he was "talking through his turban". Sahota came third in the election, which was won by Dunne with 64.1% of the vote. In 2021 it was reported that Sahota was on the shortlist to be Labour candidate at the North Shropshire by-election, but had not actually applied.

In October 2022, it was announced that he would receive a life peerage in the 2022 Special Honours. On 2 November 2022, he was created Baron Sahota, of Telford in the County of Shropshire.

Sahota is married to Sukhi and has two sons. He assists in his wife's restaurant business. They live in Ketley, Telford.

In 2019 he wrote and produced a film documentary taking an in-depth look into the Amritsar Massacre of 1919.

Orders of precedence in the United Kingdom
Preceded by The Lord Verdirame	Gentlemen; Baron Sahota	Followed by The Lord Hintze
