= Telford and Wrekin Council =

English unitary authority council in the West Midlands

Type
- Type: Unitary authority

Leadership
- Mayor: Nathalie Page, Labour since 21 May 2026
- Leader: Lee Carter, Labour since 18 July 2024
- Chief Executive: David Sidaway since January 2020

Structure
- Seats: 54 councillors
- Graph of the party split among 54 seats.
- Political groups: Administration (37) Labour (37) Other parties (17) Conservative (8) Liberal Democrats (6) Independent (3)
- Length of term: 4 years

Elections
- Voting system: First past the post
- Last election: 4 May 2023
- Next election: 6 May 2027

Motto
- "Protect care and invest to create a better Borough"

Meeting place
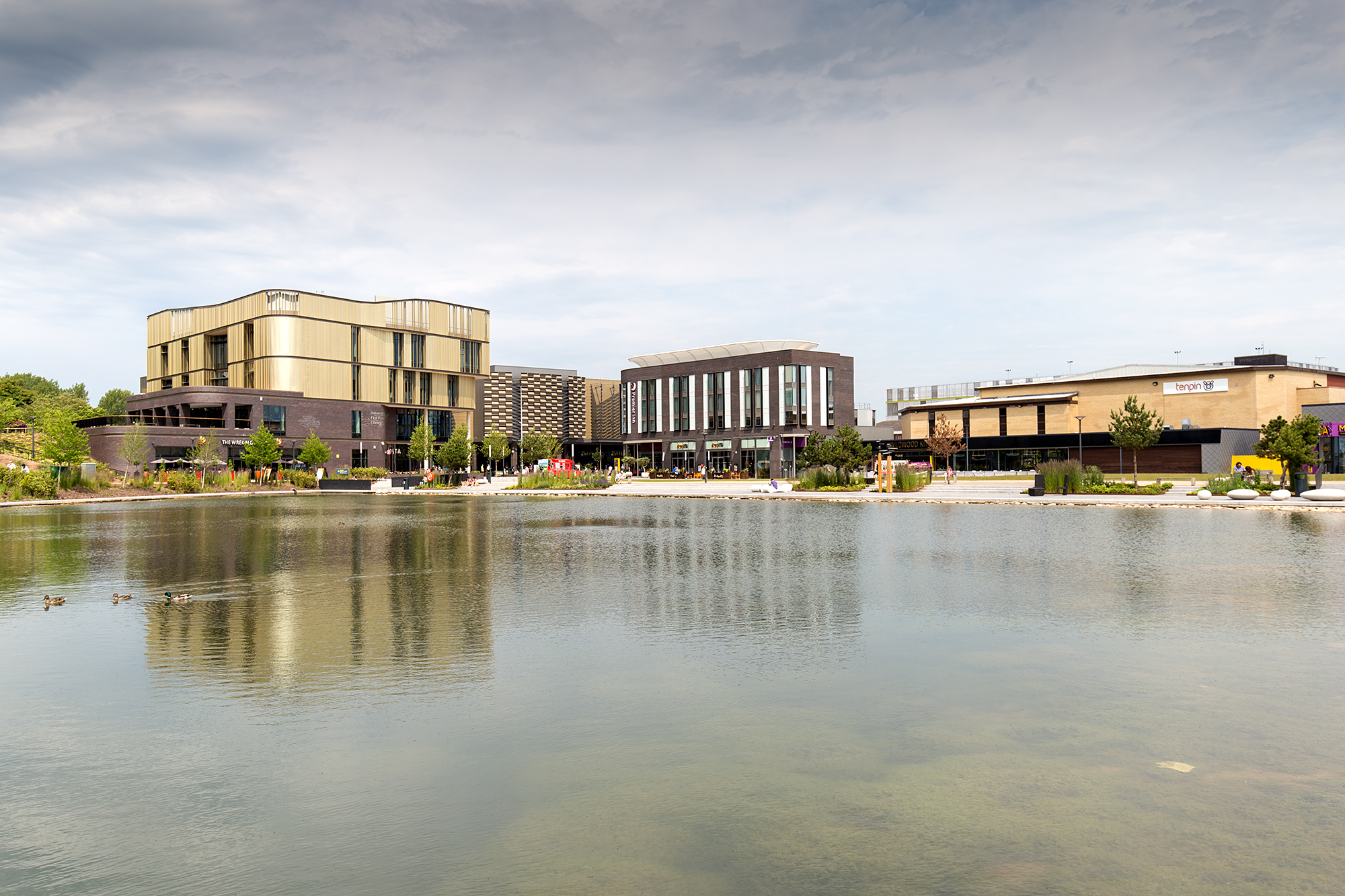
- Southwater One, Southwater Square, Telford, TF3 4JG

Website
- www.telford.gov.uk

Telford and Wrekin Council is the local authority of Telford and Wrekin in the ceremonial county of Shropshire, England. It was founded in 1974 as The Wrekin District Council, and was a lower-tier district council until 1998. The district was renamed Telford and Wrekin in 1998 when the council became a unitary authority, being a district council which also performs the functions of a county council. It is independent from Shropshire Council, the unitary authority which administers the rest of the county.

The council has been under Labour majority control since 2016. It is based at Southwater One in Telford.

== History ==
The council was created in 1974 as The Wrekin District Council, which was a lower-tier district authority with Shropshire County Council providing county-level services to the area. The district became a unitary authority on 1 April 1998, taking over county-level functions from the county council. The way this change was implemented was to create a new non-metropolitan county covering the same area as the district, but with no separate county council; instead the existing district council took on county-level functions, making it a unitary authority. The district was renamed Telford and Wrekin on the same day.

The district was granted borough status in 2002, allowing the chair of the council to take the title of mayor. The council could therefore call itself "Telford and Wrekin Borough Council", but chooses to style itself simply "Telford and Wrekin Council".

== Governance ==
As a unitary authority, Telford and Wrekin Council has the functions of a county council and district council combined. In its capacity as a district council it is a billing authority collecting Council Tax and business rates, it processes local planning applications, it is responsible for housing, waste collection and environmental health. In its capacity as a county council it is a local education authority, responsible for social services, libraries and waste disposal. The whole borough is also covered by civil parishes, which form a second tier of local government for the area.

=== Political control ===
The council has been under Labour majority control since 2016.

The first election to the council was held in 1973, initially operating as a shadow authority alongside the outgoing councils until the new arrangements came into force on 1 April 1974. Political control of the council since 1974 has been as follows:

The Wrekin District Council (lower tier non-metropolitan district)

Party in control	Years
Labour	1974–1998

Telford and Wrekin Council (unitary authority)

Party in control	Years
Labour	1998–2006
No overall control	2006–2008
Conservative	2008–2011
Labour	2011–2015
No overall control	2015–2016
Labour	2016–present

=== Leadership ===
The role of mayor is largely ceremonial in Telford and Wrekin, with political leadership instead provided by the leader of the council. The leaders since 1974 have been:

Councillor	Party	From	To
Malcolm Davies	Labour	1974	May 1986
Malcolm Smith	Labour	21 May 1986	May 1991
Phil Homer	Labour	May 1991	Oct 1998
Dave Davies	Labour	4 Nov 1998	May 2000
Phil Davis	Labour	May 2000	18 Nov 2004
Keith Austin	Labour	7 Dec 2004	2007
Andrew Eade	Conservative	2007	May 2011
Kuldip Sahota	Labour	26 May 2011	26 May 2016
Shaun Davies	Labour	26 May 2016	18 July 2024
Lee Carter	Labour	18 July 2024	

=== Composition ===
Following the 2023 election, and subsequent by-elections and changes of allegiance up to July 2026, the composition of the council was:

Party	Seats
Labour	37
Conservative	8
Liberal Democrats	6
Independent	3
Total	54

The next election is due in 2027.

== Elections ==
Since the last boundary changes in 2023 the council has comprised 54 councillors representing 32 wards, with each ward electing one, two or three councillors. Elections are held every four years.

== Premises ==
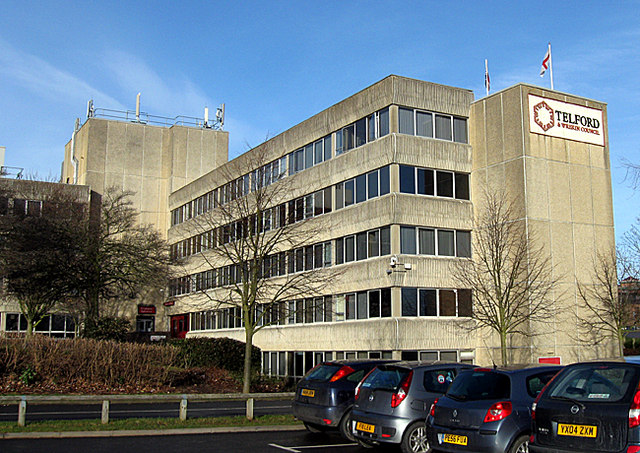
Former Civic Offices off Northgate Street: Council's headquarters until 2012, since demolished.

The council has its headquarters at Southwater One, a modern development in the centre of Telford, which opened in 2014. A council chamber was subsequently created in the building in 2024.

Until 2012 the council had its headquarters at the Civic Offices off Northgate Street. The building was subsequently demolished and a supermarket built on the site.
