= Elizabeth R. Baer =

American academic (born 1946)

- Born: Elizabeth Roberts; 1946 (age 79–80); Ithaca, New York, U.S.
- Other name: Elizabeth Roberts Baer
- Occupation: Academic
- Years active: 1968–present

Elizabeth R. Baer (born 1946) is an American academic whose work specializes in women's and Holocaust studies. She was a member of the Coordinating Council of the National Women's Studies Association from its founding in 1977 through 1979. She was appointed as the Raymond and Florence Sponberg Chair of Ethics at Gustavus Adolphus College in 2000. In 2004 and again between 2016 and 2017, she was the Ida E. King Distinguished Visiting Scholar in Holocaust studies for Stockton University in Galloway, New Jersey. She has written numerous books and articles evaluating the impact of war and conflict on women's lives. She is currently a research professor for English and African studies at Gustavus Adolphus College and a senior researcher with the United States Holocaust Memorial Museum.

== Early life and education ==
Elizabeth Roberts was born in 1946 in Ithaca, New York, to Emmie Elizabeth (née Herbermann) and James Herbert Roberts. Her mother attended Manhattanville College and graduated with a double major in biology and chemistry. She became the first woman scientist hired by the Squibb corporation and worked on their penicillin project. Roberts attended her mother's alma mater, graduating in 1968 summa cum laude with a bachelor's degree. She married Clinton D. Baer Jr., with whom she would have two children, Hester and Nathaniel Baer. Continuing her education, Baer completed a master's degree at New York University in 1970 and her PhD in 1981 from Indiana University.

== Career ==
During her studies, Baer taught at Indiana University Bloomington between 1972 and 1975 and lectured at Dartmouth College on women's studies between 1977 and 1981. The National Women's Studies Association was formed in 1977 to advocate for inclusion of women and their accomplishments in academic studies. At the time there were no national organizations in the United States which advocated for curricula which included women, and few formal advocacy groups pressing for the inclusion of women as a field of study. The governing body of the organization was a coordinating council, and Baer served on the council from its founding through 1979. In 1981, she was appointed assistant dean at Sweet Briar College in Virginia, and became dean of Washington College in Chestertown, Maryland in 1985. At both universities, in addition to her administrative duties, Baer lectured for the English department.

Baer left Chestertown in 1992 and accepted two administrative positions at Gustavus Adolphus College in St. Peter, Minnesota, as the faculty dean and vice president of academic affairs. She also taught in the English department. In 2000, she stepped away from administration and completed a Fulbright Fellowship studying the Holocaust in Germany. Completing her research, later that year, she returned to Minnesota to take up the Florence and Raymond Sponberg Professorship in Ethics and taught both English and ethics courses at Gustavus Adolphus College. Her article "A New Algorithm in Evil: Children's Literature in a Post-Holocaust World" won the Virginia Hamilton Prize from the University of Minnesota in 2001, as the best article written in 2000 on "multicultural children's literature". In 2004, she was designated as the Ida E. King Distinguished Visiting Scholar of Holocaust Studies by Stockton State College in Galloway, New Jersey, and held the post again between 2016 and 2017, teaching on genocide and gender.

Expanding her research into other conflicts, in 2012, Baer analyzed the Rwandan genocide and organized a class and lecture series about the Dakota War of 1862. She was awarded the Faculty Scholarly Accomplishment Award for this work in 2013. Two years later, she was appointed as research professor of English and African Studies at Gustavus Adolphus College, and subsequently also became a researcher at the United States Holocaust Memorial Museum in Washington, D.C. . In addition to her teaching and research in the United States, Baer taught courses in Germany, the Czech Republic, Northern Ireland, South Africa, and Namibia through Gustavus Adolphus College's January Interim Experience Program.

While she was working at Washington College, Baer was focused on transcribing nineteenth-century women's diaries, to evaluate the experiences of women impacted by war. She edited Lucy Buck's diary and published the third edition of it in 1997. The Blessed Abyss: Inmate #6582 in Ravensbrück Concentration Camp for Women, edited by Baer and her daughter evaluated the memoir of Nanda Herbermann, which had originally been published in 1946. Herbermann, a distant relative of Baer, was a Catholic with ties to high ranking Nazi officers. Although she was arrested and sent to Ravensbrück for collaborating with the resistance, Hebermann was released on the order of Heinrich Himmler. Baer and her daughter provided context of Herberman's background noting that her privilege as an Aryan with internalized anti-Semitism made her story an unusual Holocaust memoir of life in a concentration camp.

Continuing on the theme of the impact of conflict on women, in 2003, Baer and Myrna Goldenberg edited Experience and Expression: Women, the Nazis, and the Holocaust. The anthology collected and evaluated scholarship on gendered experiences of the Holocaust, examining a wide range of women’s experiences such as how authorities dealt with childbirth and pregnancy; resistance activities; the importance of recipes, writing, and art; survival strategies; and wartime sexual violence. Karin Doerr, a specialist on the Holocaust teaching at Concordia University in Montreal, noted that despite lacking a bibliography, a section on film and video presentations, an in-depth analysis of art, and other "minor shortcomings", that the volume "fills significant gaps and points clearly to new directions in our comprehension of gendered Holocaust experiences". Kirsten Krick-Aigner, a professor of German studies and chair of the language, literature and culture department at Wofford College, noted that the interdisciplinary volume gave views from actors on both sides of the conflict and brought "together some of the finest research and writing in Holocaust studies".

Baer's work The Golem Redux: From Prague to Post-Holocaust Fiction, published in 2012, examined the legend of the golem, a Jewish folk being, as it appears in contemporary comics, literature, and media. The book traces the history of the golem's metamorphosis from a Jewish protector to an evil creature, and analyzes how various interpretations of it have been manipulated to evaluate human nature, what is divine, and even social justice. In 2017, she published The Genocidal Gaze: From German Southwest Africa to the Third Reich, which evaluated the links between the Herero and Namaqua genocide and the Holocaust. By analyzing literary works, Baer noted the shared characteristics of racism, concentration and death camps, dehumanization, forced labor, medical experimentation, deliberate starvation, and rape, among others in the policies of the administrators of German South West Africa and Nazi Germany. Co-published by Wayne State University Press and the University of Namibia Press, the book has been used as a textbook in Namibia.

== Selected works ==
- Buck, Lucy Rebecca (1997). Baer, Elizabeth R. (ed.). Shadows on My Heart: The Civil War Diary of Lucy Rebecca Buck of Virginia. Athens, Georgia: University of Georgia Press. ISBN 978-0-8203-1852-3.
- Herbermann, Nanda (2000). Baer, Hester; Baer, Elizabeth R. (eds.). The Blessed Abyss: Inmate #6582 in Ravensbrück Concentration Camp for Women. Translated by Baer, Hester. Detroit: Wayne State University Press. ISBN 978-0-8143-2904-7.
- Baer, Elizabeth Roberts (September 2000). "A New Algorithm in Evil: Children's Literature in a Post-Holocaust World". The Lion and the Unicorn. 24 (3). Baltimore, Maryland: Johns Hopkins University Press: 378–401. doi:10.1353/uni.2000.0026. ISSN 1080-6563. OCLC 924120117. S2CID 143981474.
- Baer, Elizabeth R.; Goldenberg, Myrna, eds. (2003). Experience and Expression: Women, the Nazis, and the Holocaust. Detroit, Michigan: Wayne State University Press. ISBN 978-0-8143-3062-3.
- Baer, Elizabeth R. (2012). The Golem Redux: From Prague to Post-Holocaust Fiction. Detroit, Michigan: Wayne State University Press. ISBN 978-0-8143-3626-7.
- Baer, Elizabeth Roberts (2017). The Genocidal Gaze: From German Southwest Africa to the Third Reich. Detroit, Michigan: Wayne State University Press. ISBN 978-0-8143-4438-5.
