= Adventures in Lesbian Philosophy =

1994 anthology edited by Claudia Card

- Author: Claudia Card
- Language: English
- Publisher: Indiana University Press
- Publication date: December 1994
- Pages: 320
- ISBN: 978-0-253-20899-6

Adventures in Lesbian Philosophy is a collection of essays edited by Claudia Card. It was published in 1994 by Indiana University Press.

The book contains essays written by Jacquelyn Zita, Tangren Alexander, Maria Lugones, Joyce Trebilcot, Naomi Scheman, Bat-Ami Bar On, Lorena Leigh Saxe, Ruth Ginzberg, Elisabeth D. Daumer, Chris Cuomo, Barbara Houston, Kathleen Martindale, Martha Saunders, Ruthann Robson, Sarah Lucia Hoagland, Claudia Card, and Margaret A. Simons.
