= Lin Yi-chun =

Lin Yi-chun may refer to

- Lin Yi-chun (athlete), Taiwanese athlete, competed for Chinese Taipei at the 2006 Asian Games
- Lin Yi-chun (politician) (born 1970), Taiwanese politician
- Lin Yi-chun (sport shooter) (born 1981), Taiwanese sports shooter
- Yi-Chun Tricia Lin, Taiwanese gender studies academic
- Lin Yi-chun, character on The World Between Us (Taiwanese TV series)
