= Suyapa Portillo Villeda =

Honduran-American scholar

Suyapa Portillo Villeda (born July 1974) is a queer feminist scholar who primarily focuses on gender, labor, and migration in Central America. She is from Honduras but lived most of her childhood in Los Angeles, California. Her work often focuses on the intersection of these as well as with race, ethnicity, and LGBTQ+ identities in Central America, and more broadly in Latin America and the U.S. Since 2012, Portillo Villeda has been an Associate Professor of Chicano/a-Latino/a Transnational Studies at Pitzer College in Claremont, California.

== Background ==
=== Educational background ===
In 1996, Portillo Villeda earned a B.A. degree in Psychology and Spanish (Latin American Literature) at Pitzer College where she would eventually hold an Associate Professor position. She earned her Master's and Doctoral degree in History at Cornell University (2011).

=== Career ===
Portillo Villeda teaches courses related to her research expertise such as History of Central Americans in the U.S. and Gender, Sexuality, and Healthcare in the Americas. She serves as a member of the Intercollegiate Department of Chicano/a Latino/a Studies at the Claremont Colleges. Outside of the classroom, she has been involved in numerous organizations within intellectual and local communities in the U.S. and Honduras, especially regarding grassroots activism for the human rights violations of LGBTQ+ communities in Honduras after the coup d'état in 2009. After college, Portillo Villeda worked as a union field organizer in organizations such as the Korean Immigrant Workers Advocates (KIWI) and the Service Employees International Union. During her field research between 2004-2006 in Honduras she collaborated with Honduran LGBTQ+ organizations. After returning to USA, in 2008 she co-founded the May Trans Queer Contingent in Los, Angeles, California.

Portillo Villeda's book, Root of Resistance, shows how everyday acts of resistance are often-overlooked forms of resistance that should inform analyses of present-day labor and community organizing. The book was one of the two winners of the National Women's Studies Association's 2021 Sara A. Whaley Book Prize. She has also contributed to Queen and Trans Migrations, dynamics of Illegalization, Detention, and Deportation and as a guest editor for the bilingual journal Diálogo. Outside of higher education, Portillo Villeda actively contributes work in English and Spanish to media outlets in print, on radio, and online such as Univision, Radio Progreso in Honduras, NPR's Take Two podcast, the North American Congress on Latin America (NACLA), and Huffington Post.

== Scholarly contributions ==
=== On Central America, Central American transnationalism, and Honduran social movements ===
Portillo Villeda's research interests on Central America range from Central American history, gender and labor as a transnational subject between Central America and Latin America, and working class and LGBTQ+ and Queer experiences in Honduras and migration from Central America to the U.S. Others categorize her research expertise under themes and topics pertaining to capitalism, human rights, and sexuality due to her frequent intersection of labor, migration, immigration, gender, and other minority identities. Some notable examples are the way she engages with themes of delicate democracies in Central America and the migration and social movement response. Other notable contributions are her works on Central American queer migration, her organizing efforts with Latinx LGBTQ+ organizations, and effort to change the heteronormativity of the binary family migration narrative. Her most cited works in Central American scholarship deal with migration and immigration discourses between the U.S. and Central America and the Honduran social response after the 2009 coup d'état. Her newest work, a book published just this year, presents an intersection of gender, race, and labor within the context of the social movement response and resistance from Honduras' North Coast banana republic's working class. Villeda’s work offers a transnational perspective because she works with Central American lived experiences in both the Central American and U.S. context.
