= Heidi Lewis =

Heidi Lewis may refer to:

- Heidi Lewis, character played by Kim Matula
- Heidi Lewis, contestant on The Voice UK (series 8)
- Heidi R. Lewis, American Black feminist scholar
