= Leonard Dinnerstein =

American historian, professor, and author (1934–2019)

- Born: May 5, 1934; New York City, U.S.
- Died: January 22, 2019 (aged 84); Tucson, Arizona, U.S.
- Resting place: Evergreen Cemetery, Tucson, Arizona, U.S.
- Education: Theodore Roosevelt High School; City College of New York; Columbia Graduate School of Arts and Sciences (PhD)
- Occupations: Historian; author
- Spouse: Myra Anne Rosenberg (m. 1961)

Leonard Dinnerstein (May 5, 1934 – January 22, 2019) was an American historian and author. He was a professor at the University of Arizona and was a specialist on Antisemitism in the United States.

He was born in the Bronx to parents Abraham and Lillian née Kubrick. The Dinnersteins were of Jewish descent, with ancestors from Austria, Romania, and Belarus.

He attended Theodore Roosevelt High School in New York City, and graduated from the City College of New York before receiving his PhD in American history at Columbia University, where his dissertation on the lynching of Leo Frank was directed by William Leuchtenburg. The book based on his dissertation, The Leo Frank Case, has remained in print since its 1968 publication. In 1961, he married Myra Anne Rosenberg, who was the founding director of the women's studies department at the University of Arizona.

After completing his doctorate, Dinnerstein taught at New York Institute of Technology and Fairleigh Dickinson University in Teaneck, New Jersey. He joined the University of Arizona History faculty in 1970. He also directed the university's Judaic Studies Department, and was the dissertation director for the historians Virginia Scharff and H. Gelfand. He taught at the University of Arizona until his retirement in 2004.

Dinnerstein died in 2019 of complications from kidney failure at the age of 84, in Tucson, Arizona, and was buried in Tucson's Evergreen Cemetery.

== Awards ==
1994: National Jewish Book Award in the Jewish History category for Antisemitism in America

== Books ==
- The Leo Frank Case, 1968. Columbia University Press
- Ethnic Americans: A History of Immigration
- Antisemitism in America
- Jews in the South
- American vistas (1971)
- America and the Survivors of the Holocaust (1982)
- Natives and Strangers: A Multicultural History of Americans
