= Karsonya Wise Whitehead =

American educator, author and filmmaker

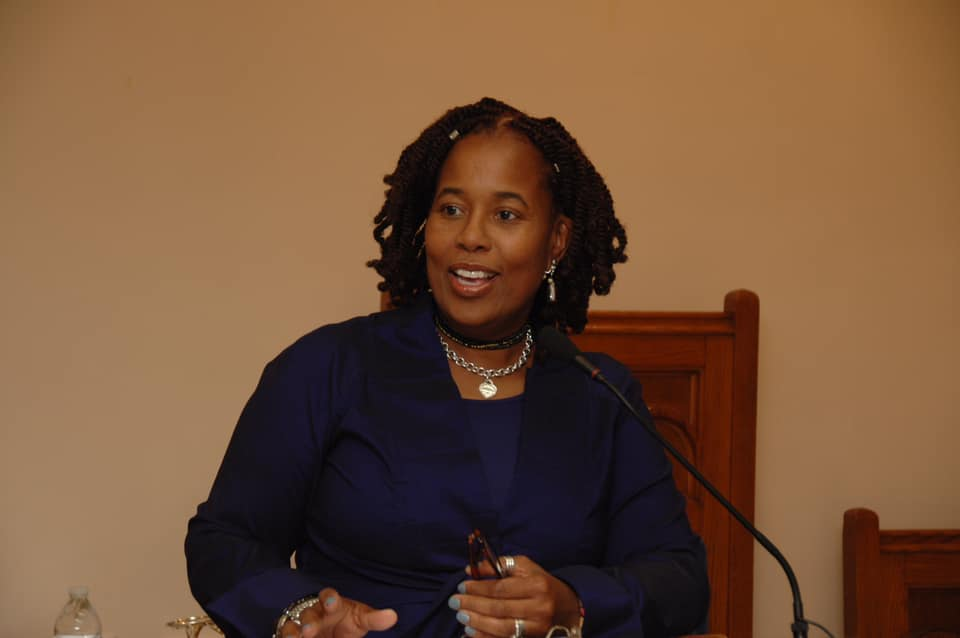
Whitehead in 2019

Karsonya “Kaye” Wise Whitehead is an American historian, professor, author, radio host, and documentary filmmaker. Her work focuses on African American history, Black women’s history, public memory, education, race, gender, and contemporary Black life. She is a professor of Communication and African and African American Studies at Loyola University Maryland and the founder and executive director of the Karson Institute for Race, Peace & Social Justice. Since 2025, Whitehead has served as president of the Association for the Study of African American Life and History (ASALH).

ASALH identifies Whitehead as the organization's 30th president and the eighth woman to hold the position. Before becoming president, she served as ASALH's national secretary. She also previously served as president of the National Women's Studies Association.

EDUCATION

Whitehead earned a B.A. in history from Lincoln University in Pennsylvania and an M.A. in International Peace Studies from the University of Notre Dame's Kroc Institute for International Peace Studies. She later received an advanced certificate in documentary and narrative filmmaking from the New York Film Academy and a Ph.D. in Language, Literacy, and Culture from the University of Maryland, Baltimore County.

ACADEMIC AND PUBLIC-HISTORY CAREER

Before entering higher education, Whitehead taught social studies in Baltimore City public schools and worked in documentary film and television. She joined the faculty of Loyola University Maryland in 2009 and was promoted to professor in 2023. Her teaching and scholarship span communication, African American studies, history, race, gender, documentary production, and public history. Loyola currently lists her as a professor of Communication and Media and identifies her areas of expertise as including nineteenth-century Black history, the Civil Rights Movement, and race, class, and gender.

In 2020, Whitehead founded the Karson Institute for Race, Peace & Social Justice at Loyola University Maryland. The institute describes its mission as bringing academic scholarship into conversation with questions of race, peace, inequality, and social justice. Whitehead serves as its executive director.

In 2025, Whitehead became president of the Association for the Study of African American Life and History, the organization founded by Carter G. Woodson in 1915 that established the tradition that developed into Black History Month. Her presidency has included public statements and initiatives concerning the preservation and teaching of Black history, voting rights, civic participation, and the role of historical institutions in American public life.

WRITING AND SCHOLARSHIP

Whitehead is the author of five books addressing African American history, education, race, family, and Black life in Baltimore. Her 2014 book, Notes from a Colored Girl: The Civil War Pocket Diaries of Emilie Frances Davis, examines the diaries of Emilie Frances Davis, a free Black woman living in nineteenth-century Philadelphia during the Civil War.

Notes from a Colored Girl received the 2015 Darlene Clark Hine Book Award from the Organization of American Historians for the best book in African American women's and gender history and the 2014 Letitia Woods Brown Book Award from the Association of Black Women Historians.

Her other books include Sparking the Genius: The Carter G. Woodson Lecture; Letters to My Black Sons: Raising Sons in a Post-Racial America; RaceBrave: new and selected works; and my mother's tomorrow: dispatches through the lens of Baltimore's Black Butterfly. The latter developed from Whitehead's study and writing about Baltimore's Black Butterfly neighborhoods and brings together her observations and community narratives about Black life in the city.

Whitehead has also published articles, essays, reference entries, curriculum materials, and book chapters on Black women's history, African American education, public memory, civil rights, race, gender, and pedagogy.

RADIO AND JOURNALISM

Since 2017, Whitehead has hosted Today With Dr. Kaye on WEAA 88.9 FM in Baltimore. The program addresses politics, history, education, race, culture, and public affairs. Her radio and journalism work has received recognition from the Radio Television Digital News Association and the Chesapeake Associated Press Broadcasters Association.

Whitehead received the 2021 Vernon Jarrett Medal for Journalistic Excellence from Morgan State University's School of Global Journalism and Communication. She was the first broadcaster to receive the medal. The award cited a body of reporting examining racial reckoning and Black life in the United States, including interviews and commentary broadcast on Today With Dr. Kaye.

FILM AND TELEVISION

Before her academic career, Whitehead worked as a documentary filmmaker and television producer, including work with MetroTV and MTV. Her documentary work received three New York Emmy nominations. In 2001, she directed and produced Twin Towers: A History, which received a New York Emmy nomination in 2002.

She has also worked as a historical consultant, on-camera expert, writer, host, and producer for documentary and public-television projects.

Selected books Sparking the Genius: The Carter G. Woodson Lecture (2014) Notes from a Colored Girl: The Civil War Pocket Diaries of Emilie Frances Davis (2014) Letters to My Black Sons: Raising Sons in a Post-Racial America (2015) RaceBrave: new and selected works (2016) my mother's tomorrow: dispatches through the lens of Baltimore's Black Butterfly (2024)

SELECTED HONORS & AWARDS

Whitehead is the recipient of more than 45 awards and honors recognizing scholarship, journalism, teaching, leadership, and public engagement. Selected honors include:

2026 C-Suite Award, AFRO's Honoring Baltimore's Leading Ladies 2026 Black History Award, Virginia Black History Month Association "A Century of Black History Commemoration." 2026 Women of Impact Award, Set the Captives Free Outreach Center 2026 Silver Telly Award, Culture & Lifestyle, State Circle Special: A Look at HBCUs in DC 2026 Bronze Telly Award, Educational Institution, State Circle Special: A Look at HBCUs in DC 2025 Bronze Telly Award, Public Interest, Where Do We Go From Here, Maryland Public Television 2025 Silver Telly Award, General Information, Where Do We Go From Here, Maryland Public Television 2025 Game Changer, Who's Who in Black Baltimore 2024 Distinguished Social Justice Advocate, Alumni Association of Lincoln University, Baltimore Metro Chapter 2024 Five Star Woman Award, Five Star Women of Color, Inc. 2024 Social Impact Award, National Pan-Hellenic Council, Inc., Metropolitan Baltimore Chapter 2024 Regional Edward R. Murrow Award for Excellence in Diversity, Equity, and Inclusion 2024 Three Chesapeake Associated Press Broadcasters Association Awards 2023 Carter G. Woodson Lyceum Award, Drinko Academy, Marshall University Awarded for service in the spirit of Dr. Carter G. Woodson. 2022 Maryland's Top 100 Women, The Daily Record 2022 Ladies & Politics Honoree, Black Girls Vote 2022 Rev. John LaFarge, S.J. Award, Fairfield University 2022 Outstanding Alumna in Humanities, University of Maryland, Baltimore County 2022 Outstanding Editorial and Commentary, Chesapeake Associated Press Broadcasters Association 2021 Vernon Jarrett Medal for Journalistic Excellence, Morgan State University School of Global Journalism and Communication 2021 Regional Edward R. Murrow Award for Excellence in Diversity, Equity, and Inclusion 2021 Leaders in Diversity Award, Baltimore Business Journal 2021 Newsmaker of the Year, AFRO 2021 Best of Show in Radio, Chesapeake Associated Press Broadcasters Association 2021 Outstanding Talk Show, Chesapeake Associated Press Broadcasters Association 2021 Second Place, Outstanding Editorial and Commentary, Chesapeake Associated Press Broadcasters Association 2021 10 Incredible Women Leaders from Baltimore, Women of the World Foundation / Google Arts & Culture 2021 Amistad Award, Central Connecticut State University Outstanding Contribution to the Struggle for Human Rights and Social Justice.
