= Nupur Chaudhuri =

Indian historian

- Born: Nupur Das Gupta; 1943 (age 82–83); New Delhi, British Raj
- Occupation: historian
- Years active: 1974–present

Nupur Chaudhuri (born 1943) is an Indian academic who has lived and worked in the United States since 1963. She was one of the early members of the Coordinating Council for Women in History and served as editor of its newsletter from 1975 to 1980; as executive secretary and treasurer from 1981 to 1987, and president from 1995 to 1998. Chaudhuri drafted the guidelines to increase diversity and inclusion and eliminate racism and sexism for the National Women's Studies Association in 1979. She was elected to membership in the teaching division of the American Historical Association in 1997. Since 2010, the Coordinating Council for Women in History annually awards a prize in her honor.

== Early life and education ==
Nupur Das Gupta (Note: Kent Donovan, a reporter for The Manhattan Mercury gives her name as Nupur Dar Gupta Chaudhuri. Searches under that name yield nothing, but the Smith College Bulletin and her master's thesis at Kansas State show her maiden surname was Das Gupta.) was born in 1943 in New Delhi, in British India. Her father was a high-ranking civil servant. The family was involved in both political and social activism. Her mother was a member of Mahila Samiti, a women's association, that was both active in charitable works and promoted non-violence and nationalism in the Indian independence movement. As a child her brothers taught her the sayings of the Quit India Movement and one of her older brothers was involved in the 1946 riots and strikes in Calcutta. As a child Das Gupta learned Bengali, English, and Hindi. In late 1952, the family moved from New Delhi to Calcutta, where she completed her elementary and secondary education.

Her mother encouraged her to enroll in literary studies, while her father insisted she study history. Das Gupta took a double major in the fields, studying first at Shri Shikshayatan College and then at Jogamaya Devi College, where she earned her Bachelor of Arts degree in 1962. She began studying for a master's degree, when she received notification that she had been accepted at Smith College in Northampton, Massachusetts. Das Gupta immigrated from Calcutta in 1963, at the insistence of her parents who wanted her to study in the United States. She earned a Master of Arts in Teaching from Smith in 1965, and then transferred to Kansas State University in Manhattan, Kansas, where she completed a second master's degree in history 1967. She chose Kansas because she loved to travel and it was located in the center of the country. In 1969, Das Gupta married Sambhudas "Sam" Chaudhuri, a geologist at Kansas State. In 1974, Chaudhuri earned a PhD in history from Kansas State University.

== Career ==
In 1974, Chaudhuri joined the Coordinating Committee on Women in the Historical Profession (CCWHP) an activist organization for historians and its Conference Group on Women's History (CGWH) which worked to increase scholarship on women. The CCWHP was formed in 1969 to create the field of women's history, to lobby against sexism and racism in the profession, and to recruit women to join the academic field of history. Chaudhuri served as editor of the CGWG newsletter from 1975 to 1980. From 1981 to 1987, she was the executive secretary and treasurer of the organization. In 1976, she was involved in the event planning of the Manhattan-Area International Women's Year Commission celebrations for the inaugural year of the United Nations Decade for Women.

In 1977, she attended the founding conference of the National Women's Studies Association and their first national conference in 1979 held in Lawrence, Kansas. Because of the frustrations she experienced, Chaudhuri wrote, A Third World Woman's View of the Convention, lamenting the devaluation and lack of representation experienced by immigrant women, women of color, and the men present at the conference. As a result and in an attempt to restructure the conference for better inclusion, the NWSA created the Third World Caucus, which later became the Women of Color Caucus. Chaudhuri was elected as one of the coordinating council members of the caucus and she drafted guidelines, which from 1980 informed conference development for eliminating racism and sexism.

During that time, Chaudhuri had difficulty securing a position in academia and was often invisible because of her race and gender, and status as an immigrant. For example, in 1982, she was one of three people selected to participate in a pilot program to assist PhD graduates of Kansas State. Though it did not provide a paid faculty position or any other monetary assistance, it offered graduates an affiliation as an associate with the university, allowing them to participate in professional seminars, gaining exposure inside and outside of the university. The article which announced Chaudhuri's participation was titled Program Links to Idle History Minds and labeled her as a "faculty wife". A few days after the announcement, Joseph M. Hawes, the chair of the history department and director of the program, wrote to The Manhattan Mercury that the associates were neither idle nor inept, that all three were published in the field and that Chaudhuri was "especially distinguished", having earned a Newberry Fellowship, served as the editor of the CCWHP's newsletter, and was the current executive secretary of the national organization.

In 1983, when the Douglas Community Center launched a project in conjunction with the Kansas Committee for the Humanities to collect oral histories of the Black community of Manhattan, Chaudhuri was hired as its director. The goal was to reconstruct the history of non-white experiences in Manhattan between 1879 and 1940 to document their little-known history. She still had no permanent employment at Kansas State in 1989, and in 1990, Chaudhuri left for France. She returned in 1993 and was giving the lecture Introduction to Women's Studies in the faculty of Arts and Sciences. In 1995, the CCWHP-CGWH changed its name to the Coordinating Council for Women in History (CCWH), uniting both the lobbying efforts and academic goals of the group. Chaudhuri was elected as the executive director and a co-president of the CCWH in 1995, and served from 1996 through 1998.

Chaudhuri was elected to membership in the teaching division of the American Historical Association in 1997. In 1999, she moved to Texas, taking a post to teach history as a professor at Texas Southern University. Between 2005 and 2007, she was the president of the Western Association of Women Historians, located in Pasadena, California. Her collaborative work, Contesting Archives: Finding Women in the Sources (2010) won the Barbara "Penny" Kanner Prize of the Western Association of Women Historians. In 2010 the CCWH launched the "Nupur Chaudhuri First Article Award" in her honor. In 2020, she presented a memoir,"Just Because Your Husband or Dad Has a Ph.D., We Have to Give You a Ph.D": An Indian Woman’s Journey towards the Ph.D. at the Organization of American Historians' annual meeting as part of a series the group commissioned to document women's status in the historical profession. In 2021, she was awarded the Rachel Fuchs Memorial Award of the CCWH for her mentorship of the LGBTQIA community and women in the history profession.

== Selected works ==
- Das Gupta, Nupur (1967). Naval Architecture: 1815–1893 (master's). Manhattan, Kansas: Kansas State University. OCLC 34300618.
- Chaudhuri, Nupur (July 1979). "A Third World Woman's View of the Convention". Women's Studies Quarterly. 7 (3). Old Westbury, New York: Feminist Press: 5–6. ISSN 0363-1133. OCLC 5547220250.
- Chaudhuri, Nupur (Summer 1988). "Memsahibs and Motherhood in Nineteenth-Century Colonial India". Victorian Studies. 31 (4). Bloomington, Indiana: Indiana University Press: 517–535. ISSN 0042-5222. JSTOR 3827855. OCLC 115738752.
- Chaudhuri, Nupur; Strobel, Margaret, eds. (1992). Western Women and Imperialism: Complicity and Resistance. Bloomington, Indiana: Indiana University Press. ISBN 978-0-253-31341-6.
- Chaudhuri, Nupur (December 1994). "Memsahibs and their Servants in Nineteenth Century". Women's History Review. 3 (4). London: Taylor & Francis: 549–562. doi:10.1080/09612029400200071. ISSN 0961-2025. OCLC 4649325876.
- Pierson, Ruth Roach; Chaudhuri, Nupur; McAuley, Beth, eds. (1998). Nation, Empire, Colony: Historicizing Gender and Race. Bloomington, Indiana: Indiana University Press. ISBN 978-0-253-33398-8.
- Boris, Eileen; Chaudhuri, Nupur, eds. (1999). Voices of Women Historians: The Personal, the Political, the Professional. Bloomington, Indiana: Indiana University Press. ISBN 978-0-253-33494-7.
- Chaudhuri, Nupur; Katz, Sherry J.; Perry, Mary Elizabeth, eds. (2010). Contesting Archives: Finding Women in the Sources. Urbana, Illinois: University of Illinois Press. ISBN 978-0-252-07736-4.
