= Lucy Freibert =

American educator

Lucy Freibert SCN
- Born: October 19, 1922; Louisville, Kentucky, U.S.
- Died: August 11, 2016 (age 93); Nazareth, Kentucky, U.S.
- Other names: Lucy Marie Freibert, Mary Lucy Freibert
- Occupation(s): Educator, activist, women's studies scholar

Lucy Marie Freibert SCN (October 19, 1922 – August 11, 2016) was an American educator, women's studies scholar, and activist, and a Sister of Charity of Nazareth. She taught at the University of Louisville from 1971 to 1993.

== Early life and education ==
Freibert was born in Louisville, Kentucky, the daughter of Joseph Anthony Freibert and Amelia J. Stich Freibert. Both of her parents were also Kentucky natives. She graduated from Spalding College in 1957 with a bachelor's degree in English. She earned a master's degree from Saint Louis University in 1962, and completed doctoral studies at the University of Wisconsin in 1970.

== Career ==
Freibert joined the Sisters of Charity of Nazareth in 1945. She taught at Catholic schools in Louisville beginning in 1947, and at Spalding College into the 1960s. In 1971, she joined the faculty of the University of Louisville, and taught American literature and women's studies courses there until her retirement in 1993. She helped establish the campus's Women's Center, volunteered with the Pleiades Theatre Company, and worked to build support for Family Scholar House, a residence for students who are single parents. She served on the coordinating council of the National Women's Studies Association, and was a member of the National Organization for Women (NOW) and the Kentucky Civil Liberties Union. Writer Esther Conwill Majozo cited Freibert as an important influence, and writer bell hooks dedicated a 2006 Louisville speech to Freibert, saying "Lucy is a goddess."

Freibert received the university's Distinguished Teaching Award (1987), the Trustees Award (1991), a Lifetime Community Service Award (2001), and the Mary K. Bonsteel Tachua Gender Equity Award (2004). In 2001 she gave an oral history interview to the Women's Rights in Kentucky Oral History Project. Her library of over a thousand books was dedicated in 2008 as the Lucy M. Freibert Collection at the University of Louisville.

== Publications ==
Freibert's scholarship often concerned feminism and utopian communities, including the Shakers and Brook Farm.

- "The Influence of Elizabeth Barrett Browning on the Poetry of Herman Melville" (1981, Studies in Browning and His Circle)
- "The Artist as Picaro: The Revelation of Margaret Atwood’s Lady Oracle" (1982, Canadian Literature)
- "World Views in Utopian Novels by Women" (1983, The Journal of Popular Culture)
- "'Weeds and Wildings': Melville's Use of the Pastoral Voice" (1983, Essays in Arts and Sciences)
- Hidden Hands: An Anthology of American Women Writers, 1790-1870 (1985, co-editor with Barbara Ann White)
- "Southern Song: An Interview with Margaret Walker" (1987, Frontiers)
- "Control and Creativity: The Politics of Risk in Margaret Atwood's The Handmaid's Tale" (1988)
- "Creative Women of Brook Farm" (1993)

== Personal life ==
Freibert died in 2016, at the age of 93, in Nazareth, Kentucky. In September 2024, the Ekstrom Library held an exhibit titled "Feminism through Lucy’s Lens: The Lucy M. Freibert Collection", curated by Aly Collins.
