= Shauna Adix =

American college administrator

- Shauna Adix, from a 1970 newspaper
- Born: Shauna McLatchy; June 13, 1932; Salt Lake City, Utah, U.S.
- Died: December 14, 1998 (aged 66)
- Occupations: Educator, college administrator
- Spouse: Vern Adix (1957-1996; his death)
- Children: 2

Shauna Adix (née McLatchy; June 13, 1932 – December 14, 1998) was an American educator and college administrator. She taught at the University of Utah, where she founded the Women's Resource Center on campus in 1971, and served on the coordinating council of the National Women's Studies Association in its early years. She was also national president of Mortar Board, a collegiate honor society.

== Early life and education ==
Shauna McLatchy was born in Salt Lake City, the daughter of Frank Blue McLatchy and Charlotte Ulke McLatchy. Her mother and grandmother were Mormons, and she was raised in that tradition. She earned a bachelor's degree in sociology from the University of Utah in 1953, and a master's degree in human relations at Ohio State University in 1958. She later completed doctoral studies in educational administration in 1976.

== Career ==
Adix taught at the University of Utah, and was program director at the Student Union Building. From 1959 to 1964, she was director of the Brighton MIA Girls Camp, a summer program for Mormon girls. In 1971, she and Ramona Adams founded the Women's Resource Center on campus, and Adix became its director. She taught in the Graduate School of Social Work at the University of Utah, and chaired the dance department for two years. She was also vice president of an advertising agency, and wrote at least six plays for children's theatre.

Adix was national president of Mortar Board from 1970 to 1973, when it was still an honor society for college women. She gave an oral history interview to the Utah State Historical Society in 1975. She served on the coordinating council of the National Women's Studies Association in 1978. In 1983 she and Florence Howe traveled and lectured on women's rights for six weeks in Japan, India and West Germany, on a trip sponsored by the US State Department. She retired in 1989. In retirement, she was active in the Crones Counsel, a feminist spiritual organization of older women.

== Personal life ==
Adix was married to theatre professor and actor Vern Adix in 1957; they adopted two children, David and Allison. Her daughter died in 1987, and her husband died in 1996. She died in 1998, aged 66 years, from ovarian cancer. Her papers are in the University of Utah Libraries Special Collections. An interview with Adix was included in James Ure's book, Leaving the Fold: Candid Conversations With Inactive Mormons (1999).
