= Vivien Ng =

American historian

President of the National Women's Studies Association
- In office 1993–1994
- Preceded by: Berenice A. Carroll and Sue Mansfield (co-chairs)
- Succeeded by: Sandra Coyner

Personal details
- Education: University of Hawaiʻi at Mānoa
- Occupation: Historian; filmmaker

Academic work
- Discipline: History
- Sub-discipline: Social history of China; Asian American studies
- Institutions: University of Hawaiʻi at Mānoa; University of Oklahoma; University at Albany, SUNY

Vivien Wai-ying Ng is an American historian and filmmaker. Born to a Chinese-American family, she obtained her PhD at the University of Hawaiʻi at Mānoa and was a professor at the University of Oklahoma before moving to the University at Albany, SUNY, where she is associate professor emerita at the Department of Women's, Gender & Sexuality Studies. A scholar of social history in China and later Asian-American studies, she was the president of the National Women's Studies Association from 1993 until 1994 and has served as the chair of SUNY Albany's Department of Women's, Gender & Sexuality Studies and women's studies program. Outside of academia, she also works on documentaries and short stories.

== Biography ==
Vivien Ng was born into a Chinese-American family, with her great-grandfather running a restaurant in Springfield, Massachusetts, her paternal grandfather running a grocery store in Chinatown, Manhattan, and her maternal grandfather being a Columbia University-educated filmmaker and businessman. She studied at the University of Hawaiʻi at Mānoa (UH), where she was awarded the 1976 Lee Shao-sheng Award for Excellence in Chinese Studies. Later, she obtained her PhD at UH; her 1980 dissertation, Homicide and Insanity in Qing China, was supervised by Brian E. McKnight.

After teaching at UH starting in 1981, she moved to the University of Oklahoma in 1982, where she was assistant professor of history and women's studies by 1987. She was a 1989 Southwestern Bell Humanities Fellow. She was one of the two 1990-1991 Rockefeller Residency Fellows at Hunter College, with her project being a study on the impact of the end of the First Sino-Japanese War on Chinese women "The New Woman: Gender Reconstruction in Modern China, 1895-1911".

She was present at the American Association of University Women (AAUW)'s 1986 Southwest Central Regional conference, became president of the AAUW's Oklahoma division in May 1987, and was part of the AAUW Educational Foundation's board from 1989 until 1993. She was the president of the National Women's Studies Association from 1993 until 1994.

In 1995, she moved to the University at Albany, SUNY, where she became director of their women's studies program by 1998. She was also chair of their Department of Women's, Gender & Sexuality Studies from 1995 until 2000 and from 2011 until 2017.

Ng initially started with social history in China, with articles on LGBT rights and rape law. In 1990, she published Madness in Late Imperial China: From Illness to Deviance, a book on the treatment of the criminally insane during Qing dynasty China which is "still being used in comparative law courses in several law schools." As of 1998, she was reportedly undergoing work on another book, Essential Woman: Construction of Womanhood in Early 20th-Century. Later, she shifted to Asian-American studies in the 1990s.

Ng has also worked in documentaries, including as a researcher and producer for the Maryknoll Sisters-focused Trailblazers in Habits. Work on two more documentaries, each focusing on Barbara Zuber and her maternal grandfather, is currently underway, as well as on a biography on Elizabeth Hirschboeck. She has also published short stories in 13th Moon and the anthology "Telling Moments: Autobiographical Lesbian Short Stories".

She lived in Norman, Oklahoma, as of 1986.

== Filmography ==
Year	Title	Note	Ref.
2014	Trailblazers in Habits	Associate producer, principal researcher	
TBA	On Her Own Terms: The Life and Work of Barbara Zuber	Under production	
TBA	Liminal State	Under production	

== Publications ==
- Madness in Late Imperial China: From Illness to Deviance (1990)
