= Pat Gozemba =

American academic and activist (born 1940)

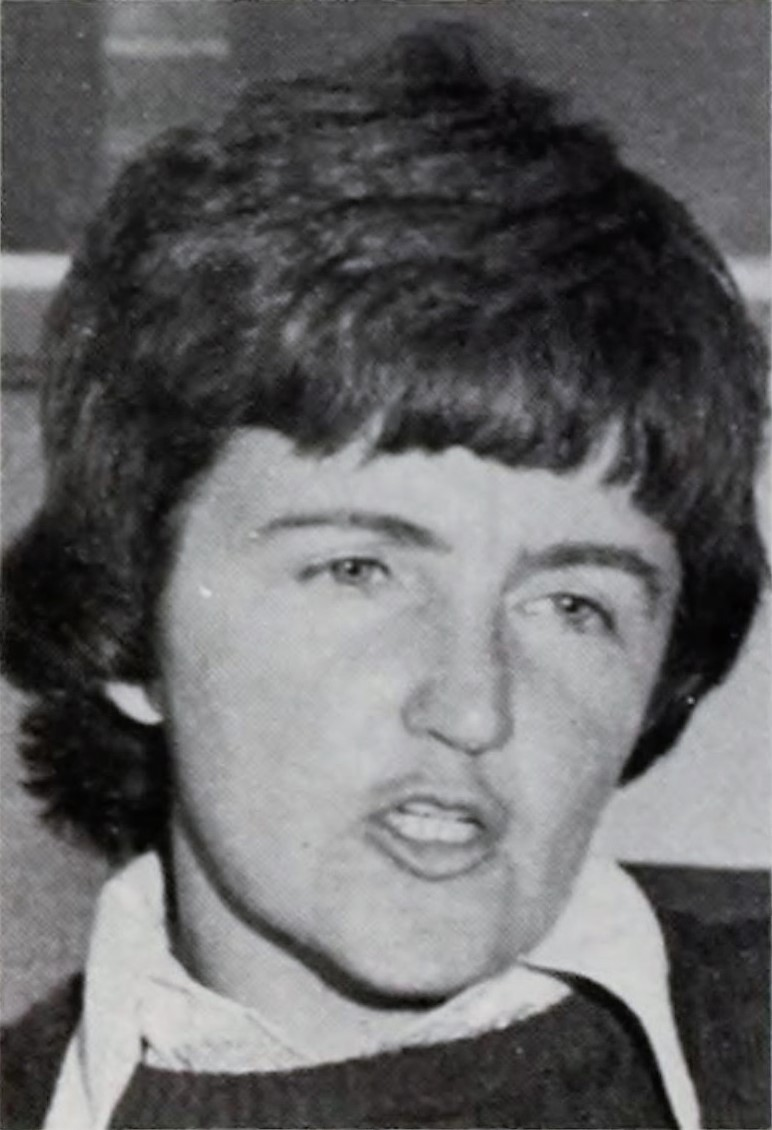
- Gozemba, 1977 yearbook from Salem State College
- Born: Patricia Andrea Curran; 1940 (age 85–86); Somerville, Massachusetts, US
- Education: Emmanuel College; University of Iowa
- Occupations: Academic; activist
- Years active: 1963–present

Patricia Andrea Gozemba (born 1940) is an American academic and activist. She grew up in Massachusetts and was involved in the political movements of the 1960s and 1970s, including the Civil Rights Movement, the Women's Liberation Movement and protests against the Vietnam War.

After earning her degree, she became a teacher, married, divorced, and became an activist in the LGBT and environmental movements. She was one of the founders of the women's studies program at Salem State College and its first coordinator. Gozemba served on the Coordinating Council of the National Women's Studies Association from 1979 to 1982 and was president for 1988 and 1989.

Many of her works aimed to recover the history of the LGBT community in and around Boston. Involved in the fight for the legalization of same-sex marriages, she campaigned in Massachusetts, Vermont, and Hawaii. She was the co-author of Courting Equality, a history of Massachusetts' path to legalizing same-sex marriage and several works aimed at documenting lesbian history of women before the feminist movement. Since her retirement, she has been active in environmental causes and is the current co-chair of the Salem Alliance for the Environment (SAFE).

== Early life and education ==
Patricia Andrea Curran was born in 1940 in Somerville, Massachusetts, to Mary M. (née Sampey) and John C. P. Curran. Curran called her father "Cookie" and her mother "The Beak". When she was eleven, the family relocated to Waltham, Massachusetts, where her mother worked as a bookkeeper. Her father worked at Boston Linotype Print and at the Boston Herald in the pressroom. Growing up, Curran was close to her father, but wrote that she was estranged from her mother, who was ashamed that her daughter was a lesbian. Curran attended Emmanuel College in Boston, where she served as senior class president and graduated in 1962.

== Career ==
=== Women's studies ===
Curran began her career as a high school English teacher at Waltham High School. In 1963, she organized women educators, encouraging them to join the teachers' union and completed her master's degree at the University of Iowa. From 1964, she taught English at Salem State College. Around 1968, Curran married and began using the surname Gozemba, but she and her husband would later divorce. She was active in the protests against the Vietnam War and the feminist movement, rallying both feminists and pacifists to join Boston protest gatherings. She was also involved in the Civil Rights Movement and as an environmental activist.

In 1971, Gozemba and other faculty members began introducing women's studies into their curricula. The subject was approved as an interdisciplinary undergraduate minor degree program in 1975. She began working as coordinator of the program prior to its full accreditation and was a leader in the drive to develop an English-language program to provide intensive training to non-native speakers of English at Salem State. In 1972 she created a slide show that was presented in local schools and community meetings to expose sexism in advertising. The following year, she and other colleagues filed a lawsuit to achieve salary equality for women at Salem State. It was eventually settled in their favor and salary discrimination was later eliminated at all Massachusetts state colleges. Also in 1973, she was a founder of the Florence Luscomb Women's Center on Salem State's campus and organized a support group for lesbians in the Salem area at the facility. Gozemba completed her EdD at Boston University in 1975, with a thesis titled The Effect of Rhetorical Training in Visual Literacy on the Writing Skills of College Freshmen. She joined the National Women's Studies Association when it was formed in 1977 and served as the New England regional representative until 1979.

=== LGBT activism ===
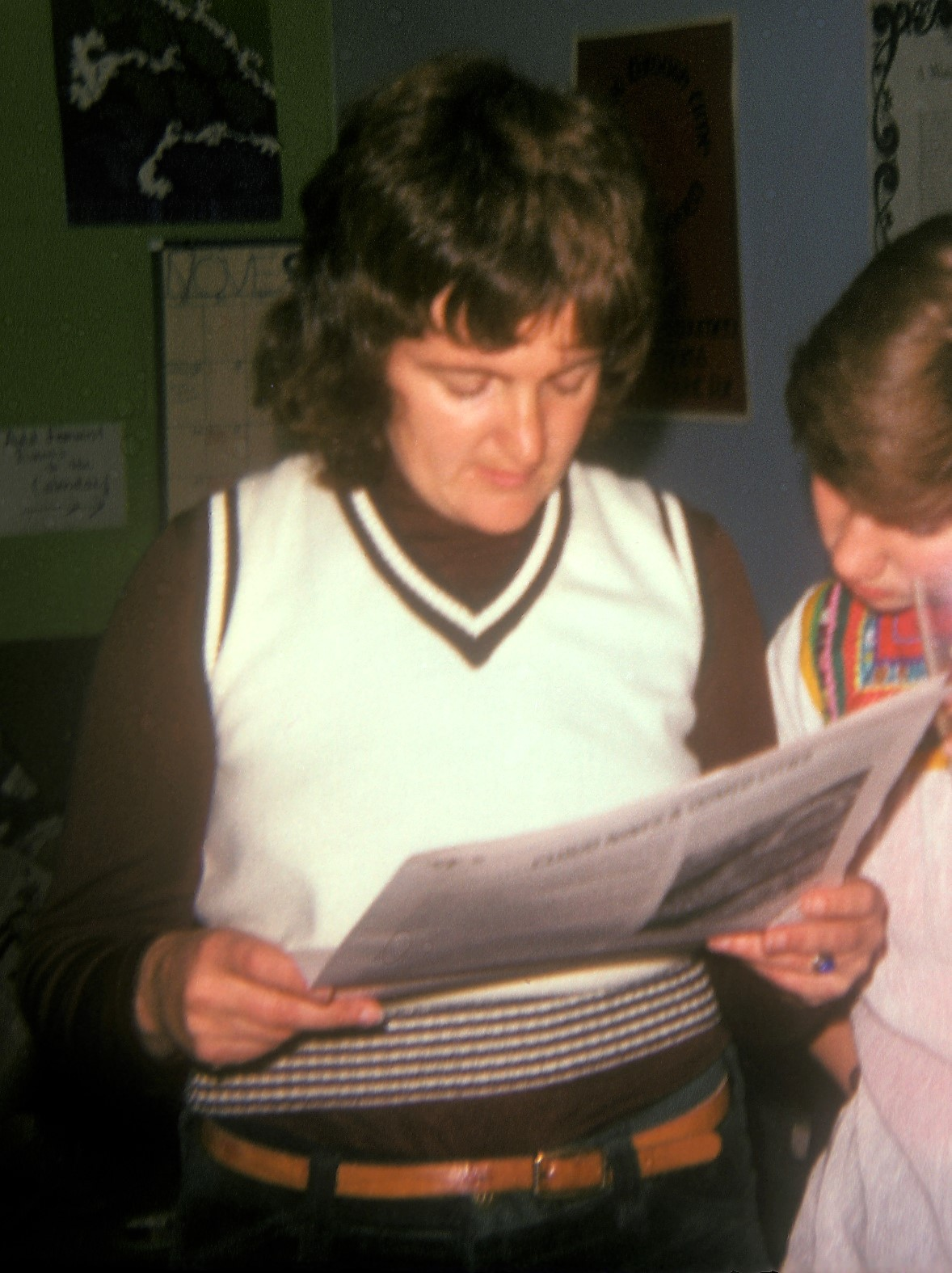
Gozemba at Salem State Women's Center, 1970s

When three bills with impact on the LGBT community were slated to be reviewed by the Massachusetts legislature in 1978, Gozemba and eleven other activists formed the North Shore Gay Alliance and began registering voters. That year, she gave an interview about her life to the Boston Herald publicly coming out as a lesbian. Because of the shame her mother felt over the interview, Gozemba's parents moved from Waltham to Falmouth, Massachusetts. After the bills were successfully defeated, the organization turned its focus toward social and educational programs designed to bring community members together.

Gozemba was one of the founding members of the Boston Area Lesbian and Gay History Project, which was a collective formed in 1979 to gather and research the history of the LGBT community of Boston. She also served on the Coordinating Council of the National Women's Studies Association from 1979 to 1982 and as president of the organization in 1988 and 1989.

In the 1980s, Gozemba began a study of lesbian bar culture, writing such articles as Building Community, Finding Love: Lesbian Bar Culture since the Forties; In and around the Lighthouse: Working-Class Lesbian Bar Culture in the 1950s and 1960s; and Scenes from a Working Class Bar. She presented Building Community, Finding Love at the National Women's Studies Association's 7th Annual Conference in Seattle, Washington and In and around the Lighthouse written with Janet Kahn at the Seventh Berkshire Conference on the History of Women, hosted by Wellesley College in 1987. Each of these works evaluated what it meant for women to be out or closeted in a public space, the butch and femme culture, and how lacking traditional family support, women forged new types of families in bar spaces. These studies were among the few academic attempts to document lesbian history for those earlier lesbians who were not part of the feminist movement.

Gozemba and Karen Kahn, a fellow activist, began a relationship in 1990. After her mother died in 1993, Gozemba re-established a connection with her father, learning from him that he had not had a problem with her sexuality. She shared caring for him with her sister and brother because of his health problems. From 1997 to 1998, Gozemba took a teaching exchange post in Hawaii, entrusting her father's care to her siblings. Her father's health continued to decline and he died in 1999.

In 2002, she published with Eileen de los Rios, Pockets of Hope, a critique of the authoritarian aspects of the public education system in the United States. The book looked at innovative solutions used in states from Hawaii to New Hampshire to combat societal issues like ageism, classism, homophobia, racism, sexism, and xenophobia. It also evaluated how teachers and students could work to reduce inequality and discrimination, driving social change and optimism for the future, while at the same time preserving cultural traditions and the natural environment. Soon after the book was published, Gozemba retired from Salem State University. Her teaching was recognized by the G. Theodore Mitau Award for Innovation and Change in Higher Education of the American Association of State Colleges and Universities.

=== Marriage equality ===
In 2004, Gozemba and Kahn began collaborating on a book about the struggle for marriage equality in Massachusetts. While conducting research, they uncovered all the legal reasons that marriage would be beneficial to them and they married on September 1, 2005, in Cambridge, Massachusetts, where the first same-sex marriage in the United States had been officiated. Their book, Courting Equality: A Documentary History of America's First Legal Same-Sex Marriages was published in 2007. The book chronicled marriage and LGBT history in Massachusetts and included both positive and negative milestones, including, for example, a law from 1843 that allowed interracial marriage, the 1913 law that barred non-residents from marrying in Massachusetts if their marriage would be prohibited under the laws of the state in which they were residents, and the 1974 election of an openly gay state legislator. The book gave the political history of the Massachusetts struggle to develop the LGBT community, for it to gain visibility and for the legalization of same-sex marriage. Personal stories of the litigants in Goodridge v. Department of Public Health were illustrated with photographs by Marilyn Humphries. Academic K. L. Broad noted in a review of the work that the book was a beneficial reference for understanding the ideological and legal processes underlying family, gender, and sexual politics in the United States.

Gozemba traveled to Vermont in 2007 to lend her support for the marriage equality drive in that state. Two years later, Gozemba, who had lived for four months each year in Hawaii since the 1980s, testified before the Hawaiian Senate during their debates on civil unions. She countered claims made by Brian Camenker and his organization MassResistance in a report that had been distributed to Senators. The report made false claims that legalizing same-sex marriage had led to higher HIV/AIDS rates in Massachusetts and to changes in the school curricula in the state to include LGBT-focused books. Jo-Ann Adams, a lobbyist for the civil union bill, had Gozemba draft a rebuttal document to Camenker's claims that was distributed to Senate members. According to Ethan Jacobs' report in Bay Windows, "Adams said Gozemba was able to persuade many that Camenker's claims were not credible".

=== Environmental activism ===
Gozemba has been involved in several environmental efforts in and around Salem. Since about 2010, she has been co-chair of the Salem Alliance for the Environment (SAFE) and served on the board of HealthLinks. She has worked on such issues as developing a comprehensive long-term plan for maintaining, rehabilitating, or repurposing the Salem Harbor Power Station. Gozemba, who lives only a short distance from the power plant, is concerned about pollution and its long-term effects on the health of the public. Given the age of the facility, she has pressed the city to make a plan in case it was abandoned to include how much clean-up would be necessary to use the land for other purposes. She has also been involved in pushing the city to address the problem of natural gas leaks from aging infrastructure that cause destruction of trees and green spaces.

== Legacy ==
In 2018, the Massachusetts Commission on the Status of Women named Gozemba and five other women "Unsung Heroines", for their work in community development. Salem State University created an award bearing her name that honors campus role models in the LGBT community.

== Selected works ==
- Gozemba, Patricia Andrea (1975). The Effect of Rhetorical Training in Visual Literacy on the Writing Skills of College Freshmen (EdD). Boston, Massachusetts: Boston University. OCLC 7756288.
- Gozemba, Pat (July 28, 1984). "Scenes from a Working Class Bar". Gay Community News. Vol. 12, no. 3. pp. 8–9, 11. ISSN 0147-0728.
- Gozemba, Pat (1985). Building Community, Finding Love: Lesbian Bar Culture since the Forties (VHS tape). College Park, Maryland: National Women's Studies Association. OCLC 14987385.
- Kahn, Janet; Gozemba, Patricia A. (1992). "5. In and around the Lighthouse: Working-Class Lesbian Bar Culture in the 1950s and 1960s". In Helly, Dorothy O.; Reverby, Susan (eds.). Gendered Domains: Rethinking Public and Private in Women's History; Essays from the Seventh Berkshire Conference on the History of Women. Ithaca, New York: Cornell University Press. pp. 90–106. ISBN 978-0-8014-9702-5.
- Gozemba, Patricia A. (1995). "Bloody Noses". In Yamaguchi, Lynne; Barber, Karen (eds.). Tomboys!: Tales of Dyke Derring-Do (1st ed.). Los Angeles, California: Alyson Publications. pp. 23–38. ISBN 978-1-55583-285-8.
- Gozemba, Pat (1999). "Cookie and Me". In Gould, Jean (ed.). Dutiful Daughters: Caring for Our Parents as They Grow Old. Seattle, WA: Seal Press. pp. 136–152. ISBN 978-1-58005-026-5.
- De los Reyes, Eileen; Gozemba, Patricia A. (2002). Pockets of Hope: How Students and Teachers Change the World. Westport, Connecticut: Bergin & Garvey. ISBN 978-0-89789-523-1.
- Gozemba, Patricia A.; Kahn, Karen (2007). Courting Equality: A Documentary History of America's First Legal Same-Sex Marriages. Boston, Massachusetts: Beacon Press. ISBN 978-0-8070-6620-1.
