= Myra Dinnerstein =

American women's studies advocate (1934–2026)

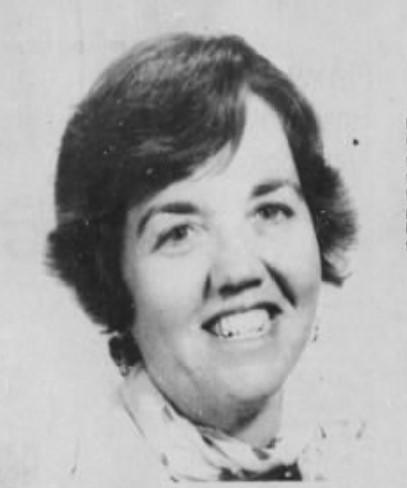
- Dinnerstein, 1975
- Born: Myra Anne Rosenberg; April 29, 1934; Philadelphia, Pennsylvania, U.S.
- Died: July 15, 2026 (aged 92); Tucson, Arizona, U.S.
- Years active: 1971–2005
- Spouse: Leonard Dinnerstein (m. 1961; died 2019)

Myra Anne Dinnerstein (April 29, 1934 – July 15, 2026) was an American women's studies advocate who was the founding director of the women's studies program at the University of Arizona. After completing an undergraduate degree at the University of Pennsylvania and a doctorate at Columbia University, she began teaching at the University of Arizona. In 1975, she started the women's studies program as an academic minor, and grew it into a full department with accredited undergraduate and master's degrees. She successfully fought an attempt to remove the program launched by the Arizona State Legislature because lesbian history and achievements were included in the curriculum. She retired in 2003 and was honored in 2005 the Women's Plaza of Honor.

== Early life and education ==
Myra Anne Rosenberg was born in Philadelphia, Pennsylvania on April 29, 1934, to Kathryn (née Sharp) and Benjamin Rosenberg. She was Jewish. Her father manufactured clothes and she and her older brother Edwin, grew up in Elkins Park, Pennsylvania. Their mother died when Rosenberg was twelve years old. Both siblings attended the University of Pennsylvania. Upon completion of their studies, Edwin joined their father's firm, while Rosenberg pursued graduate studies in history at Columbia University in New York City. In 1958, Rosenberg met a student, Leonard Dinnerstein, in one of her classes. They began dating, and married in Philadelphia on August 20, 1961. During her studies, she worked for a publishing house and taught at Manhattanville College in Purchase, New York. She completed her dissertation, The American Board Mission to the Zulu, 1835–1900 in 1971, earning her PhD in African historiony.

== Career ==
The couple moved to Tucson, Arizona in July 1970, where Leonard had secured a professorship in history at the University of Arizona. Dinnerstein lectured in the continuing education department of the university and also taught courses at Pima Community College from 1971. She began offering a course in women's history at the University of Arizona in 1974, and the following year was selected as the inaugural director of the newly established field of women's studies. Dinnerstein recalled that it was difficult to prove that the field was legitimate and in the beginning the entire program consisted of herself and a secretary, and was only offered as an academic minor. Designing an interdisciplinary curricula, she used teachers from other departments with specialties in history, literature, sociology, and other fields to incorporate women's achievements in those fields. In 1976, she worked with Laurel L. Wilkening to establish the university's program on women in science and engineering.

In 1977, Dinnerstein became one of the founding members of the National Women's Studies Association, serving on the coordinating council as a representative of the Southwest region and as treasurer of the national organization. Her university office was moved in 1978 into the mathematics building, which had no women's restrooms. By 1983, the university had accredited an undergraduate degree in women's studies and she developed a master's degree program in 1995. Full department status was granted in 1997 with eight permanent faculty members. In 1999, the Arizona State Legislature unsuccessfully attempted to dismantle the program after a parent complained that lesbians were included in a literary course. Dinnerstein dismissed the complaint saying that women's studies had always included lesbian history and should continue to include both heterosexual and homosexual issues. She stated that erasure of lesbian involvement in women's movements and activities was a "way of devaluing woman and trying to keep women quiet."

Dinnerstein and her husband both retired in May 2003, but she continued to work with the university, serving on the Millennium Project Oversight Committee. She was one of the first honorees of the Women's Plaza of Honor, dedicated in 2005. On April 24, 2025, she was inducted into the Arizona Women's Hall of Fame for her contribution to Women's Studies.

== Death ==
Dinnerstein died in Tucson on July 15, 2026, at the age of 92.

== Research ==
Dinnerstein wrote advisory articles regarding the integration of women into traditional curricula to prevent ghettoization of women's studies. She argued that without introducing women's contributions to various fields, students would graduate without the knowledge that women had participated in society and in science. The work of Dinnerstein and colleagues, according to scholar Elizabeth J. Sacca was important in challenging "academic disciplines to revise their notions of research and recognition to include women as fully as men" and evaluating the issues encountered while they pressed for change.

Her other research interests included work done on aging and menopause and the changes in perception of older women over time. She also wrote several articles on body image and the false perception that the way someone looks is an indication of their character. As a successful woman who was overweight, she was not interested in the negative effects of discrimination, but rather in how women who were fat and successful overcame the obstacles. She also analyzed whether the methods differed based on ethnic group and sexual orientation in a course she taught on the subject.

== Selected works ==
- Dinnerstein, Myra (1971). The American Board Mission to the Zulu, 1835–1900 (PhD). New York, New York: Columbia University. OCLC 1017251419. (subscription required)
- Dinnerstein, Myra; O'Donnell, Sheryl; MacCorquodale, Patricia (Spring 1982). "Integrating Women's Studies into the Curriculum". Women's Studies Quarterly. 10 (1). Old Westbury, New York: Feminist Press: 20–23. ISSN 0732-1562. JSTOR 40003117. OCLC 5547189190.
- Dinnerstein, Myra; Schmitz, Betty, eds. (1986). Ideas and Resources for Integrating Women's Studies Into the Curriculum. Vol. 1 & 2. Tucson, Arizona: Southwest Institute for Research on Women. OCLC 18043107.
- Aiken, Susan Hardy; Anderson, Karen; Dinnerstein, Myra; Lensink, Judy; MacCorquodale, Patricia (Winter 1987). "Trying Transformations: Curriculum Integration and the Problem of Resistance". Signs. 12 (2). Chicago, Illinois: University of Chicago Press: 255–275. ISSN 0097-9740. JSTOR 3173985. OCLC 5548287504.
- Dinnerstein, Myra; Schmitz, Betty, eds. (1989). Ideas and Resources for Integrating Women's Studies Into the Curriculum. Vol. 3. Tucson, Arizona: Southwest Institute for Research on Women. OCLC 18043107.
- Dinnerstein, Myra (1992). Women Between Two Worlds: Midlife Reflections on Work and Family. Philadelphia, Pennsylvania: Temple University Press. ISBN 978-0-87722-884-4.
- Dinnerstein, Myra; Weitz, Rose (June 1994). "Jane Fonda, Barbara Bush and Other Aging Bodies: Femininity and the Limits of Resistance". Feminist Issues. 14 (2). New Brunswick, New Jersey: Transaction Periodicals Consortium: 3–24. doi:10.1007/BF02685654. ISSN 0270-6679. OCLC 5656565515.
