= Mumble rap =

Style of hip-hop

- Other names: Non-lyrical rap
- Stylistic origins: Hip-hop; trap; drill
- Cultural origins: Early 2010s, Southern United States, especially Atlanta
- Typical instruments: Vocals (auto-tune); guitar; drum machine (Roland TR-808)

Regional scenes
- Southern United States

Local scenes
- Atlanta; Memphis; Miami

Other topics
- Auto-Tune; cloud rap; chopper rap; road rap

Mumble rap (also known as non-lyrical rap) is a loosely defined style and era of hip-hop that emerged and proliferated via the online audio distribution platform SoundCloud during the mid-to-late 2010s. The term originated as a pejorative used to describe a vocal style characterized by unclear or incoherent enunciation, often described as "mumbling", which represented a shift away from traditional hip-hop conventions centered around complex or meaningful lyricism, and instead emphasizing other aspects of delivery like melody, mood, and tone.

While "mumble rap" originated as a pejorative, some have reappropriated the label, with various critics and artists defending the style as a new phase in the evolution of hip-hop.

== Etymology and characteristics ==
The earliest known usage of the term "mumble rap" was in 2014 by VladTV battle rap journalist Michael Hughes, in an interview with battle rapper Loaded Lux about the style's emergence in mainstream hip-hop. There is disagreement over who first rapped in such a style, although its creation has been attributed to rappers such as Lil Wayne, Gucci Mane, Chief Keef, Young Thug, Rich Homie Quan, Migos, Sahbabii, Playboi Carti, and most notably Future, whose 2011 single "Tony Montana" is often cited as the first mumble rap song; however, there have been sources dating as far back as October 2011 of even older releases by other artists. Artists such as Das EFX and Fu-Schnickens may have rapped in a similar style years before the term was created. The term was first used to describe rappers whose lyrics were unclear, but the use of the term has expanded to include rappers that some critics claim "generally put little emphasis on lyricism or lyrical quality".

Mumble rap is used mostly as a derogatory term, in reference to a perceived incoherence of the artist's lyrics. Oscar Harold of the Cardinal Times stated that "mumble rap" is misleading, arguing that the rappers such as Future rely more upon pop melodies and vocal effects, such as auto tune, than mumbling. Justin Charity, a staff writer at The Ringer, argues that the term is unnecessarily reductive and does not in fact refer to one specific type of rapping. He wrote that many of the artists often scapegoated in conversations about the subgenre do not actually mumble, which "is the red flag that the term isn't a useful subcategorization."

There are disputes as to whether some rappers are mumble rappers or not. There is also conflation between mumble/SoundCloud rap and other new generation-led evolutions or niches such as trap and cloud rap. The Cleveland Plain Dealer's Troy L. Smith writes that 21 Savage unfairly gets classified as a mumble rapper.

== SoundCloud rap scene ==
SoundCloud logo

In 2017, music critic Jon Caramanica of The New York Times opined that SoundCloud rap "in the last year has become the most vital and disruptive new movement in hip-hop". Todd Moscowitz, the founder of Alamo Records, called the scene a "lo-fi movement" noting the heavily distorted bass and intentional lack of polish in the sound. When Ski Mask the Slump God discussed the genre's lo-fi sound and recording techniques, he noted, "It was like the worst recording set up, [but] you could set it up anywhere and that was the wave we were on... The raw energy of that—the distortion—is our speciality, and we used that to our advantage." Spin noted that the SoundCloud company has not been able to leverage the popularity of SoundCloud rap to improve its financial problems. In January 2019, Stephen Witt of Rolling Stone magazine argued that the SoundCloud rap wave was in decline, citing the death of Lil Peep in 2017 and murder of XXXTentacion in 2018, as well as 6ix9ine's legal troubles. The death of Juice Wrld in 2019 has been attributed as the moment SoundCloud rap died.

== Reception ==
=== Praise ===
In defense of the style, Justin Charity of The Ringer suggested that the debate is "really about discomfort with how a generation of young musicians has chosen to use their voices in strange, unprecedented ways, and against the wishes of their parents and forefathers." The Guardian compared the style to the first wave of punk, noting a shared "sonic simplicity, gleeful inanity, and sense of transgression." The Vibe linked mumble rap to earlier forms of hip-hop, as well as jazz scatting. For The Conversation, Adam de Paor-Evans disputed the idea that mumble rap is a reflection of laziness, suggesting instead that it is an accurate reflection of boredom resulting from the immediacy and speed of contemporary cultural life." Red Bull Music Academy stated that "however they're labeled—SoundCloud rap, emo-trap, mumble rap—one thing's for sure: these rappers are forging new paths, once again pushing the boundaries of what rap is, who it's for and how it's distributed."

Rap pioneer Grandmaster Caz expressed acceptance of the style, stating: "It's all good. They’re a different generation, they do a different thing, they have a different agenda, and their influences come from different places. So I’m not mad at them." Funk pioneer George Clinton of Parliament-Funkadelic declared himself a listener of mumble rap, stating "we try to pay attention to whatever the new music is that gets on your nerves." Podcaster and television host The Kid Mero dismisses criticisms of the style, stating: "Sonically if your shit is wack, why am I gonna listen to what you gotta say? If I turn it on, and the beat is kind of annoying, I’m not gonna sit through that just to hear you say 'lyrical, metaphysical, giftical…' I don’t want to do all that."

=== Criticism ===
Rappers who have voiced discontent with mumble rap include J. Cole, Hopsin, Chris Webby, Logic, Russ, Joyner Lucas, Taboo of Black Eyed Peas, and Eminem. After declaring that the "boom bap is coming back with an axe to mumble rap" in Royce da 5'9"'s song "Caterpillar", Eminem criticized multiple mumble rappers on his album Kamikaze. Eminem's diss track "Killshot", which was targeted at Machine Gun Kelly, included a line where he insults MGK, calling him a mumble rapper. Noted rap artist Pete Rock prominently criticized the style for abandoning hip-hop tradition.

Dr. Heidi R. Lewis published Make Rappers Rap Again: Interrogating the Mumble Rap "Crisis" in the Oxford University Press Theorizing African American Music Series. In the book, which features an interview with DJ Drama, Lewis "contrarily and perhaps controversially ... argues Mumble Rap is real Hip Hop. Relying primarily on discourse analysis, [she examines] Mumble Rap's congruence with oft-forgotten or subjugated Hip Hop cornerstones like illegibility, melody, the DJ, and the subgenre, as well as the ways most mumble rappers practice citational and collaborative politics that are congruent with real Hip Hop. [Lewis also takes] a critical approach to examining the Mumble Rap sound, arguing it's much more complicated than it’s often characterized, especially concerning flow and production. To explain the subjugation of Mumble Rap, [she situates] the subgenre as southern and examines the ways it challenges dominant notions about real Hip Hop masculinity vis-à-vis mumble rappers' attention to the mental and emotional, drug use and addiction, and the fallacies of gender and sexuality norms."

== See also ==
- African-American Vernacular English
- Asemic writing
- Atlanta hip-hop
- Chicago hip-hop
- Chopper
- Crunk
- Drill music
- Internet rap
- Landfill indie
- List of hip-hop genres
- Scat singing
- SoundCloud rap
- Southern hip-hop
- Weird SoundCloud
