= National Women's Studies Association =

Women's studies organization

- Formation: 1977
- Type: 501(c)
- Location: United States
- Region served: North America
- Members: 2,350
- Key people: Heidi R. Lewis, President; Umme al-Wazedi, Secretary; Hiram Ramirez, Treasurer; Kristian Contreras, Executive Director
- Staff: 2
- Website: www.nwsa.org

The National Women's Studies Association (NWSA) is an organization founded in 1977, made up of scholars and practitioners in the field of women's studies. NWSA's mission is to further the global development of women's studies through open dialogue and communication.

In addition to hosting annual conferences, NWSA provides access to constituency groups and offers various awards, including NWSA Book Prizes. Since its inception, NWSA has been the subject of controversy based on its failure to include the perspectives of marginalized women in its initiatives.

== Founding ==
In 1973, women's studies pioneer Catharine R. Stimpson called for the founding of a national women's studies organization. Discussions took place over the next three years in women's studies spaces. In 1976, Sybil Weir from San Jose State University called an official meeting for people interested in creating plans for a national organization.

Following a grant from the Ford Foundation, the first NWSA conference was held in January 1977 at the University of San Francisco, co-sponsored by San Jose State University and the Santa Clara County Commission on the Status of Women. Over 500 people attended the three-day convention. According to Barbara W. Gerber, who served on NWSA's Coordinating Council, NSA aimed to be inclusive of all women, with a subset of regional groups, and agreed upon a leadership group known as the Coordinating Council.

== Mission ==
NWSA was formed to further the social, political, and professional development of women's studies throughout the world. The organization centers open dialogue and communication among women for positive social change and was founded upon the women's liberation movement. It promotes freedom from sexism, racism, homophobia, antisemitism, anti-Zionism, and from all suppressive ideologies and institutions. Its goals are to equip women to enter society and transform the world to one without systemic oppression.

== Controversies ==
=== Racism and classism ===
Women of color protested racism within the organization during its early years, as did immigrant women. Men also reported being treated as if they had no right to participate. In 1979, after attending the conference, Nupur Chaudhuri wrote an article A Third World Woman's View of the Convention, outlining her negative experiences. As a result, the NWSA created the Third World Caucus, later the Women of Color Caucus, and established a coordinating council of the group. Chaudhuri drafted guidelines for inclusiveness to eliminate sexism and racism in future conferences, which were implemented in 1980. During NWSA's 1981 conference in Storrs, Connecticut, poet Audre Lorde gave the keynote address admonishing conference-goers that if "women in the academy truly want a dialogue about racism, it will require recognizing the needs and living contexts of other women."

The 1981 conference was further criticized by Chela Sandoval for its classism, as travel fare and conference fees were difficult to afford. This coupled with the theme of racism caused attendance rates to suffer. The lack of inclusivity for women of color led to the Third World Women's Consciousness Raising group to discuss issues of racism and classism in NWSA.

During the closing of the 1981 conference Barbara Smith, a member of the Combahee River Collective (CRC), asserted that for all the white women within NWSA tired of hearing about racism, there were just as many women of color who were sick of experiencing it. She criticizes NWSA for the disconnect between their goals and actions by stating their definition of feminism fails at being inclusive of all women. Smith's work within the CRC argues not to separate race from class or sexual oppression because they are experienced simultaneously.

Former NWSA president Beverly Guy-Sheftall noted, "I wanted NWSA to be an inclusive, multiracial, multicultural organization where women of color and their feminisms would not be marginalized." Led by feminists like Guy-Sheftall, NWSA has worked to center intersectionality in its institutional practices and leadership structure with the support of a Ford Foundation grant.

=== Lesbian separatism ===
During the 1977 conference, lesbians spoke about their invisibility in NWSA. Lesbians during this time were combating internal and external homophobia along with their racist and classist issues. This birthed the Lesbian Women's Caucus which sought to address issues of homophobia from within the organization and the media.

=== Anti-Zionism ===
In 2015, the NWSA membership voted to "back the boycott, divestment, and sanctions movement against Israel" along with other major academic organizations. In response to critiques of antisemitism following their support of member Jasbir K. Puar, NWSA responded by stating the organization holds firm in their conviction.

== Membership ==
NWSA offers individual annual memberships with cost bands based on employment, income, and student status. Individuals members can find colleagues in the member directory, present at the annual conference, receive reduced registration rates, apply for scholarships and conference grants, apply for NWSA awards and prizes, and participate in the discussion forums. Benefits of being an individual membership include being able to be a representation member and have the ability to discuss ideas.

Institutions can list their program, department, or nonprofit organization in the public member directory, receive three complimentary student memberships annually, post employment listings related to women's studies, and participate in the discussion forum.

The National Women's Studies Association held its annual conference. The conference that was held in November year of 2013. The conference was called " Negotiating Points of Encounter". The conference focused on sub themes such as "the sacred and profane", "border and margins", "futures of the feminist past", and "body politics".

=== Constituency groups ===
NWSA membership offers the ability to join several constituency groups, including:

Caucuses

- Aging and Ageism Caucus
- Community College Caucus
- Feminist Mothering Caucus
- Girls and Girls Studies Caucus
- Graduate Student Caucus
- Indigenous Peoples Caucus
- Jewish Caucus
- Lesbian Caucus
- North American Asian Feminist Collective
- Queer and Trans People of Color Caucus
- South Asian Feminist Caucus
- Trans/Gender-Variant Caucus
- Transnational Feminisms Caucus
- Undergraduate Student Caucus
- Women of Color Caucus

Interest groups

- Animal Studies/Animal Ethics Interest Group
- Arts and Performance Interest Group
- Asexuality Studies Interest Group
- Confronting Campus Sexual Assault
- Contingent Faculty Interest Group
- Disabilities Studies Interest Group
- Distance Education Interest Group
- Early Modern Women Interest Group
- Fat Studies Interest Group
- Feminism and Activism Interest Group
- Feminist Masculinities Interest Group
- Feminist Media Studies Interest Group
- Feminist Pedagogy Interest Group
- Feminist Spirituality Interest Group
- Feminists for Justice In/For Palestine
- Gender, Women's, and Feminist Studies (GWFS) PhD Interest Group
- Law and Public Policy Interest Group
- Publishing Feminisms Interest Group
- Reproductive Justice Interest Group
- Third Wave Feminisms Interest Group

Task forces

- Anti White Supremacy Task Force
- International Task Force
- Librarians Task Force
- Science and Technology Task Force
- Social Justice Education Task Force

== Journal ==
NWSA publishes Feminist Formations, a journal that cultivates feminist conversations from around the world regarding research, theory, activism, teaching, and learning. The journal changed its name from NWSA Journal in 2010 to be inclusive of both NWSA conference papers and works from academic sources and individuals globally.

== Awards ==
Every year from April to June, NWSA presents awards and prizes for books, students, and women's centers:

Book prizes

- Gloria E. Anzaldúa Book Prize
- Alison Piepmeier Book Prize
- Sara A. Whaley Book Prize
- NWSA/UIP First Book Prize

Student prizes

- NWSA Graduate Scholarship
- NWSA Women of Color Caucus-Frontiers Student Essay Award
- Trans/Gender-Variant Caucus Award
- Lesbian Caucus Award

Women's center awards

- Outstanding Achievement Award
- Emerging Leader Award
- Founders Awards
- Lifetime Achievement Award

== Presidents ==
Prior to 1983, the board of directors was styled as a coordinating council without a hierarchical structure. There was no defined leadership and the size of the council made conducting business difficult. Council members included faculty, staff, and students elected from twelve regional divisions as well as special focus areas like, representatives of the Global South, lesbians, staff, and pre-K-12 teachers.

Members who served from 1977 to 1983 included:

=== Coordinating Council (1977–1983) ===
- Joyce Abbott, Buffalo, New York (1979–1981)
- Emily Abel, California State University, Long Beach, (1979)
- Shauna Adix, University of Utah, (1978)
- Elizabeth Alexander, New England College, (1977–1978)
- Azizah al-Hibri, Washington University in St. Louis, (1982)
- Katherine Amato-von Hemert, Evanston, Illinois, (1981–1982)
- Judith Anderson, Jamestown, Rhode Island, (1981–1983)
- Nancy Angelo, Los Angeles, California, (1981–1983)
- Elizabeth R. Baer, Wilder, Vermont, (1977–1979)
- Angelika Bammer, Madison, Wisconsin, (1980–1982)
- Mae Barrow, Venice, California, (1981)
- Wilma Beaman, State University of New York at Oswego, (1982–1983)
- Evelyn Beck, University of Wisconsin–Madison, (1977–1979)
- Elizabeth Birch, University of Hawaii, (1980)
- Karen Blackwell, Columbus, Ohio (1979–1981)
- Maija Blaubergs, University of Georgia, (1977–1979)
- Chris Bose, University of Washington, (1977–1979)
- Clare Bright, University of Washington, (1979–1983)
- Betsy Brinson, Richmond, Virginia, (1980–1983)
- Marva Brown, University of Wisconsin–Milwaukee, (1979–1981)
- Nanette Bruckner, University of Houston–Clear Lake, (1977–1978), (1981–1983)
- Elisa Buenaventura, West Newton, Massachusetts, (1977)
- Susan Cayleff, Brooklyn College, (1977–1979)
- Nupur Chaudhuri, Douglas Community Center, Manhattan, Kansas (1980)
- Martha Chew, Boston, Massachusetts, (1982–1983)
- Ginger Chih, San Francisco, California, (1977–1978)
- Charlotte Christe, Newark, Delaware, (1980)
- Nan Cinnater, University of Missouri–St. Louis, (1980)
- Denni Johnson Clagett, Maryland, (1979)
- Ann Clarkson, Portland Community College, (1980–1981)
- Sandra Coyner, Kansas State University, (1982–1983)
- Rosemary Curb, Rollins College, (1982–1983)
- Virginia Cyrus, Southampton, Pennsylvania, (1980–1983)
- Chris Czernik, Cambridge, Massachusetts (1982–1983)
- Myra Dinnerstein, University of Arizona, (1977)
- Linda Dolive, Northern Kentucky University, (1979)
- Rosie Doughty, Lorain City School District, (1977–1978)
- Anne Elizabeth, Berkeley, California, (1977)
- Pamella Farley, Brooklyn College, (1977–1979)
- Moira Ferguson, University of Nebraska–Lincoln, (1977–1979)
- Judith Fetterley, State University of New York at Albany, (1977–1979)
- Jan Finzelber, Berkeley, California, (1981–1983)
- Coralyn Fontaine, University of Pittsburgh, (1981–1982)
- Jeanne Ford, University of Texas at Arlington, (1979–1982)
- Lilyan Frank, University of Southern California, (1979–1981)
- Shirley Frank, City University of New York, (1979)
- Lucy Freibert, University of Louisville, (1980–1982)
- Loyola Gauna, Albuquerque, New Mexico, (1981–1983)
- Barbara Gerber, State University of New York at Oswego, (1981–1983)
- Janine Giarrusso, Pittsburgh, Pennsylvania, (1982)
- Sherna Gluck, Topang, California, (1977–1978)
- Lori Gold, Atlanta, Georgia, (1978–1979)
- Sylvia Gonzales, San Jose State University, (1977)
- Doris Goodrich, Honolulu, Hawaii, (1981)
- Susan Gore, Ft. Worth, Texas, (1980–1982)
- Pat Gozemba, Salem State College, (1979–1982),
- Elsa Greene, University of Pennsylvania, (1977–1978)
- Christine Guerro, Washington University in St. Louis, (1981–1983)
- Sharon Hagan, Hyattsville, Maryland, (1980)
- Mary Lynn Hamilton, University of Arizona, (1981–1983)
- Marilyn Harman, University of Hawaii, (1977–1978), (1979–1981)
- Kathy Hickok, Iowa State University, (1982–1983)
- Barbara Hillyer-Davis, University of Oklahoma, (1977–1979), (1982–1983)
- Florence Howe, The Feminist Press, (1979)
- Barbara Jacobskind, Southeastern Massachusetts University, (1979–1981)
- Gayle Johnson, Buffalo, New York, (1977–1978)
- Pauline Kayes, Parkland College, (1980–1981)
- Natalie Kazmierski, Vestel, New York, (1980–1982)
- Elizabeth Kincaid-Ehlers, Trinity College of Connecticut(1979)
- Sylvia Kramer, Great Neck, New York, (1977–1978)
- Mary Kay Lane, Douglass College, (1977)
- Sharon Leder, State University of New York at Buffalo, (1982–1983)
- Aldora Lee, Moscow, Idaho, (1981–1983)
- Bettina Lewis, Goucher College, (1981–1983)
- Jeanine Lindstrom, Stephens College, (1980–1982)
- Martha Maas, Ohio State University, (1982–1983)
- Irene Mack, University of Wisconsin–Milwaukee, (1980)
- Diane Marting, New Brunswick, New Jersey, (1980)
- Barbara Matthews, Palm Beach Community College, (1982–1983)
- Paula Mayhew, Ardmore, Pennsylvania, (1979–1981)
- Diane McDermott, University of Kansas, (1982–1983)
- Maggie McFadden-Gerber, Appalachian State University, (1980–1982)
- André McLaughlin, Medgar Evers College, (1981–1982)
- Toni McNaron, University of Minnesota, (1977–1978)
- Elizabeth Meese, University of Alabama (1981–1983)
- Jan Meriwether, Center for Self-Reliant Education, Sunnyvale, California, (1978–1980)
- Kristian Miccio, State University of New York at New Paltz, (1980–1983)
- Pat Miller, University of Connecticut, (1980–1982)
- Helen Moore, University of Nebraska–Lincoln (1982–1983)
- Sandra Moore, Alverno College, (1977–1978)
- Sherri Moses, Lansing, Michigan, (1977)
- Yolanda T. Moses, Long Beach, California (1982–1983)
- Julie Murphy, Chicago, Illinois, (1982)
- Sirlean Newton, University of Southern California, (1980–1981)
- Sandy Nickel, University of Missouri, (1981–1983)
- Margaret Nielsen, Molokai, Hawaii, (1980–1982)
- Ann Nihlen, University of New Mexico, (1981–1983)
- Lucia Ortiz, Jamaica Plain, Massachusetts, (1982–1983)
- Barbara Parker, University of Colorado Boulder, (1979–1981)
- Linda Parker, Ann Arbor, Michigan, (1982–1983)
- Luvenia Pinson, Brooklyn College, (1977–1978)
- Sandy Pollack, Ithaca, New York, (1982–1983)
- Rae Jeane Popham, Santa Monica College, (1978)
- Cathy Portuges, University of Massachusetts, (1977–1978)
- Pat Quercia, Brooklyn College, (1977–1978)
- Mirtha N. Quintanales, Columbus, Ohio, (1980–1981)
- Deborah S. Rosenfelt, San Francisco State University, (1979)
- Mary Rothschild, Arizona State University at Tempe, (1982–1983)
- Sandra Rubaii, Tompkins Cortland Community College, (1978), (1982)
- Carol Lee Sanchez, San Francisco State University, (1982–1983)
- Diane Sands, University of Montana, (1977–1978)
- Nancy Schniedewind, State University of New York at New Paltz, (1979–1981)
- Patricia Bell-Scott, University of Tennessee, (1977–1978)
- Susan Shaffer, Berkeley, California, (1977–1979)
- Carol Shakeshaft, Hofstra University, (1980–1983),
- Thelma Shinn, Arizona State University, (1981–1983)
- Nancy Skeen, University of South Dakota, (1980–1982)
- Eleanor Smith, University of Cincinnati, (1981–1983)
- Mary Margaret Smith, University of California, Los Angeles, (1982–1983)
- Wilda Smith, Fort Hays State College, (1977–1978)
- Alice Stadthaus, Salem, Massachusetts, (1981–1982)
- Beth Stafford, Champaign, Illinois, (1981–1983)
- Judith Ann Sturnick, Capital University, (1977)
- Barbara Taylor, University of Arkansas, Fayetteville, (1979–1983)
- Irene Thompson, University of Florida, (1979–1981)
- Mary Thornberry, University of Arizona, (1980–1982)
- Susan Tournour, NA Survival School of Brant, NY, (1980)
- Kathryn "Kay" Towns, Pennsylvania State University at Middletown, (1979–1983)
- Catherine Tromovitch, Davis, California, (1982–1983)
- Suzanne Vilmain, Los Alamos, New Mexico (1977–1978)
- AnMarie Wagstaff, Davis, California (1982–1983)
- Billie Wahlstrom, University of Southern California, (1977–1979), (1982–1983)
- Elizabeth Waters, Portland, Oregon, (1981–1982)
- Barbara Waugh, Graduate Theological Union, (1980)
- Louise Weeks, Scarritt College, (1977)
- Diane Woolis, University of Connecticut, (1980–1983)
- Robin Wright, San Jose, California, (1980–1982)

=== Chairs (1983–1993) and presidents (1994–present) ===
- 1983–1985, Clare Bright, Mankato State University
- 1985–1986, Martha Maas, Ohio State University
- 1986–1987, Helen A. Moore, University of Nebraska–Lincoln
- 1987–1988, Wilma Beaman, State University of New York at Oswego
- 1988–1989, Patricia A. Gozemba, Salem State College
- 1989-1991, Marlene Longenecker, Ohio State University
- 1991–1992, Wilma Boddie-Beaman, The College at Brockport, State University of New York
- 1992–1993 (co-chairs), Sue Mansfield, Claremont McKenna College and Berenice A. Carroll, Purdue University
- 1993–1994, Vivien Ng, State University of New York at Albany
- 1994–1995, Sandra Coyner, Southern Oregon University
- 1995–1996, Marjorie Pryse, State University of New York at Albany
- 1996–1997, Betty J. Harris, University of Oklahoma
- 1997–1998, Barbara Gerber, State University of New York at Oswego
- 1998–1999, Bonnie Zimmerman, San Diego State University
- 1999–2000, Berenice Carroll, Purdue University
- 2000–2001, Annette Van Dyke, University of Illinois Springfield
- 2001-2002, Magdalena García Pinto, University of Missouri
- 2002-2003, María C. González, University of Houston
- 2003–2004, Colette Morrow, Purdue University-Calumet
- 2004–2005, Jacquelyn Zita, University of Minnesota
- 2005–2006, Judith Roy, Century College
- 2006–2008, Barbara J. Howe, West Virginia University
- 2008–2010, Beverly Guy-Sheftall, Spelman College
- 2010–2012, Bonnie Thornton Dill, University of Maryland
- 2012–2014, Yi-Chun Tricia Lin, Southern Connecticut State University
- 2014–2016, Vivian M. May, Syracuse University
- 2016–2018, Barbara Ransby, University of Illinois Chicago
- 2018–2020, Premilla Nadasen, Barnard College
- 2020–2022, Karsonya Wise Whitehead Loyola University Maryland
- 2023–Present, Heidi R. Lewis, Colorado College
