= Yi-Chun Tricia Lin =

Taiwanese feminist scholar

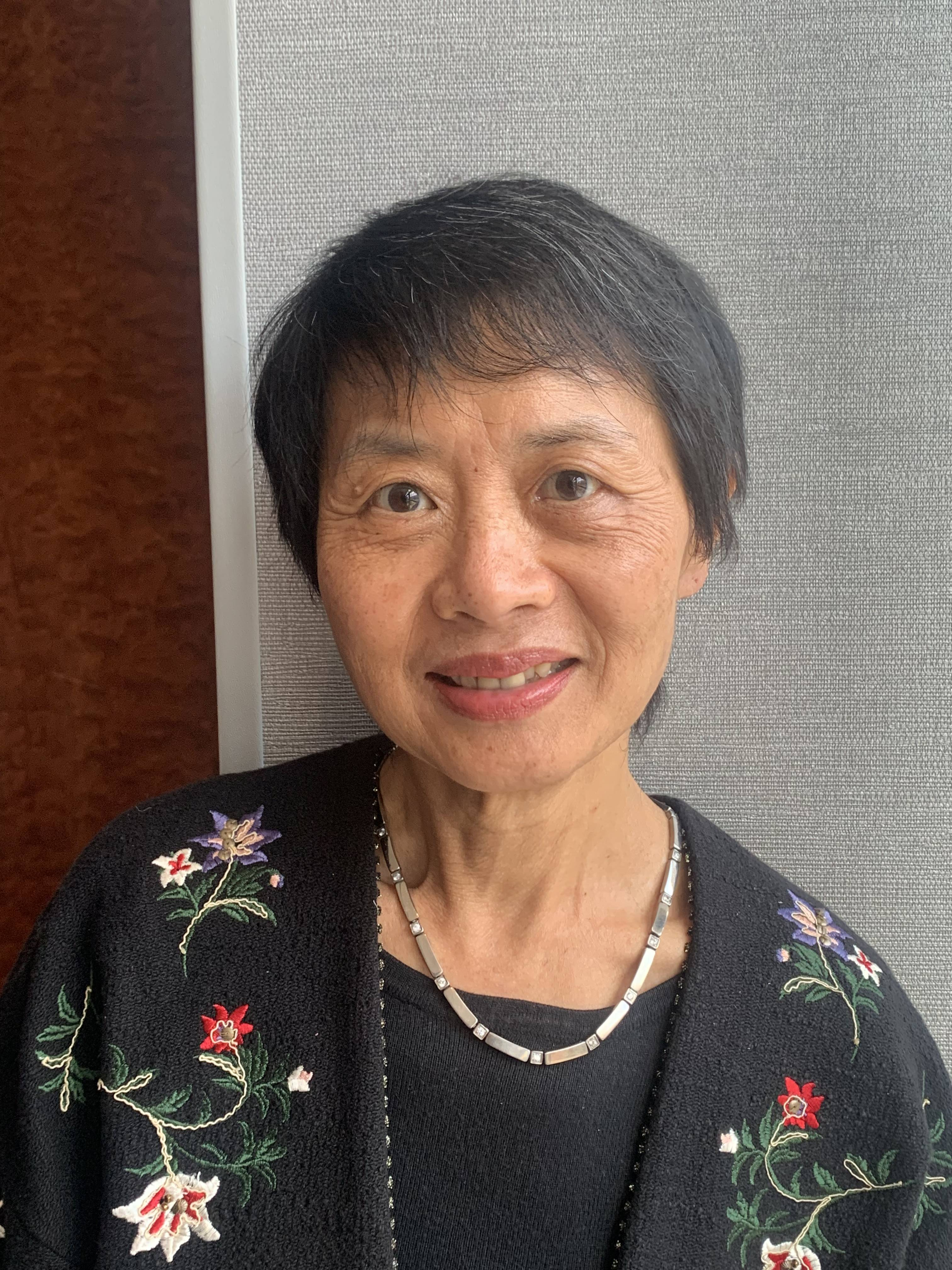
- Alma mater: National Taiwan Normal University; Tamkang University
- Occupation: Teacher
- Employer: Borough of Manhattan Community College (–2004); Southern Connecticut State University
- Awards: J. William Fulbright Prize (2018, Fulbright Program)

Chinese name
- Traditional Chinese: 林怡君
Transcriptions
Standard Mandarin
- Hanyu Pinyin: Lín Yí Jūn
- Position held: professor (2008–), assistant professor (–2004), associate professor (2004–2008)

Yi-Chun Tricia Lin (Chinese: 林怡君) is a Taiwanese feminist scholar. She is a professor at Southern Connecticut State University and director of its Women's, Gender, and Sexuality Studies program. She was the president of the National Women's Studies Association from 2012 to 2014. She is the co-founder of the North American Asian Feminist (NAAF) Collective Caucus at the National Women's Studies Association Conference.

== Early life and education ==
Lin was born in Taiwan. She attended Zhunan Primary School in Taiwan. In 1982, she received a Bachelor of Arts degree in English and American Literature from National Taiwan Normal University. She earned a Master of Arts degree in Western Languages and Literatures from Tamkang University.

== Career ==
In 2001, She received a $24,000 grant from the National Endowment for the Humanities for her research on Pacific Islander writers. In 2002, her work was featured by the Asian American / Asian Research Institute. Lin worked as an Assistant Professor of English at Borough of Manhattan Community College until 2004. She started working at Southern Connecticut State University (SCSU) in 2004. In 2005, Lin co-authored the afterword with Greg Robinson in the reissued print of "Restless Wave: My Life in Two Worlds: A Memoir" by Ayako Ishigaki in 2005. The Japanese American National Museum hosted her and Robinson at an event on April 24, 2005 to discuss the book. In 2008, Lin was promoted from associate professor to full professor at SCSU. In 2012, she was awarded the President's Appreciation Award alongside Dorinda Borer for the 26th annual Carroll E. Brown Scholarship & Community Awards. From 2012 to 2014, Lin served as the president of the National Women's Studies Association. In 2018, she was awarded a Fulbright Fellowship for her research and worked out of National Dong Hwa University's College of Indigenous Studies's Department of Ethnic Relations and Cultures for the duration of her fellowship. In 2022, she presented her work "Remembering Usu'uru: Indigenous Women's Mobilizing and Transnational Feminist Solidarity" at the American Comparative Literature Association.

== Affiliations ==
Lin is affiliated with the National Women's Studies Association. She is also a member of the board of directors for the Peace Development Fund.
