= Jacquelyn Zita =

American born philosopher

Jacquelyn Zita is an American born philosopher, active in environmental justice issues and how they impact gender and racial justice considerations. A former professor at the University of Minnesota, Zita is known for her involvement in the Women's Environmental Institute, which she helped found in 2003, and her role as WEI's farm manager and director of education and operations.

== Personal background ==
Raised in Missouri, Zita attended William Chrisman high school for her first 3 years of high school. Truman High school, Independence MO opened in 1964 and Zita spent her senior year there, graduating in 1965. Zita was a talented tennis player in this pre-Title IX era, so she played on the boys tennis team, lettering for 3 years at William Chrisman High School before playing an undefeated season as the #1 seed at Truman High School, leading the team to the conference championship. She graduated from Truman High School in 1965. She was named to the Truman High School Hall of Fame in 2018.

== Education ==
Zita attended Washington University in St. Louis. She received her BA in Biology and Chemistry in 1969, graduating Phi Beta Kappa. She went on to study Philosophy in graduate school at Washington University in St. Louis, receiving her Ph.D. in 1982.

== Professional ==
A Professor of Gender, Women and Sexuality Studies in the College of Liberal Arts at the University of Minnesota, Zita has taught a variety of courses such as "EcoFeminism and Environmental Justice" Zita has also held a number of influential academic positions at the university and at the National Level, including:

- Chair, Department of Women's Studies, University of Minnesota: 1995 - 2001.
- Co-Chair of the National Women's Studies Association Program Administration and Development Committee: 2000 - 2003.
- President of the National Women's Studies Association: 2004 - 2005.

Zita has been recognized for her teaching and mentoring skills with the following awards:

- College of Liberal Arts Teaching Award, University of Minnesota, 1991
- Morse Alumni Teaching Award, University of Minnesota, 1997
- Academy of Distinguished Teachers, 1997
- University of Minnesota Mortar Board Honor Society Award for Outstanding Faculty, 2001
- University of Minnesota Community Service Award, 2006

In 2003, Zita helped found the Women's Environmental Institute, a non-profit organization designed to address environmental injustice issues. An active member of the WEI, Zita serves as the farm manager and director of education and operations of the institute's Amador Farms. This 70 acre farm is a community resource for organic farming, designed as a sustainable operation that provides education and food to the community while helping to foster urban agriculture where food injustice issues are so pronounced.

== Personal life ==
Zita and her domestic partner Karen Clark, who was both the first openly gay person to run and be elected to the Minnesota state legislature and also the longest serving state lawmaker in U.S. history, were together for 35 years, and married 11 years prior to Clark's death in 2026.

== Publications ==
- Third Wave Feminisms. Zita, Jacquelyn, Hypatia: A Journal of Feminist Philosophy (special issue), 1997.
- The Reproduction of Whiteness: Race and the Regulation of the Gendered Body. Zita, Jacquelyn, Alison Bailey, ed., Hypatia: A Journal of Feminist Philosophy, 2007.
- Body Talk: Philosophical Reflections on Sex and Gender. Zita, Jacquelyn, Columbia University Press, Author, 1998
