= University of Namibia Press =

The University of Namibia Press, UNAM Press, is the dedicated scholarly publishing unit of the University of Namibia and is based at the Windhoek main campus. Established in 2002, it was officially inaugurated in February 2012 and has to date published books on history, law, language and science. Books published by the University of Namibia Press are distributed internationally by the African Books Collective.

The press has an editorial board composed of University of Namibia academics representing diverse disciplines. The UNAM Press unit is headed by a publisher who also acts as the deputy director of the university's Centre for Research and Publication.

== Books ==
Memoirs published by the press include a first person account of the first Namibian woman to receive military training during Namibia's liberation war, 'Mukwahepo', written as told to Ellen Ndeshi Namhila and the biography of retired politician and medical doctor Libertina Amadhila 'Making a Difference'.
