= Heidi R. Lewis =

American Black Feminist Scholar

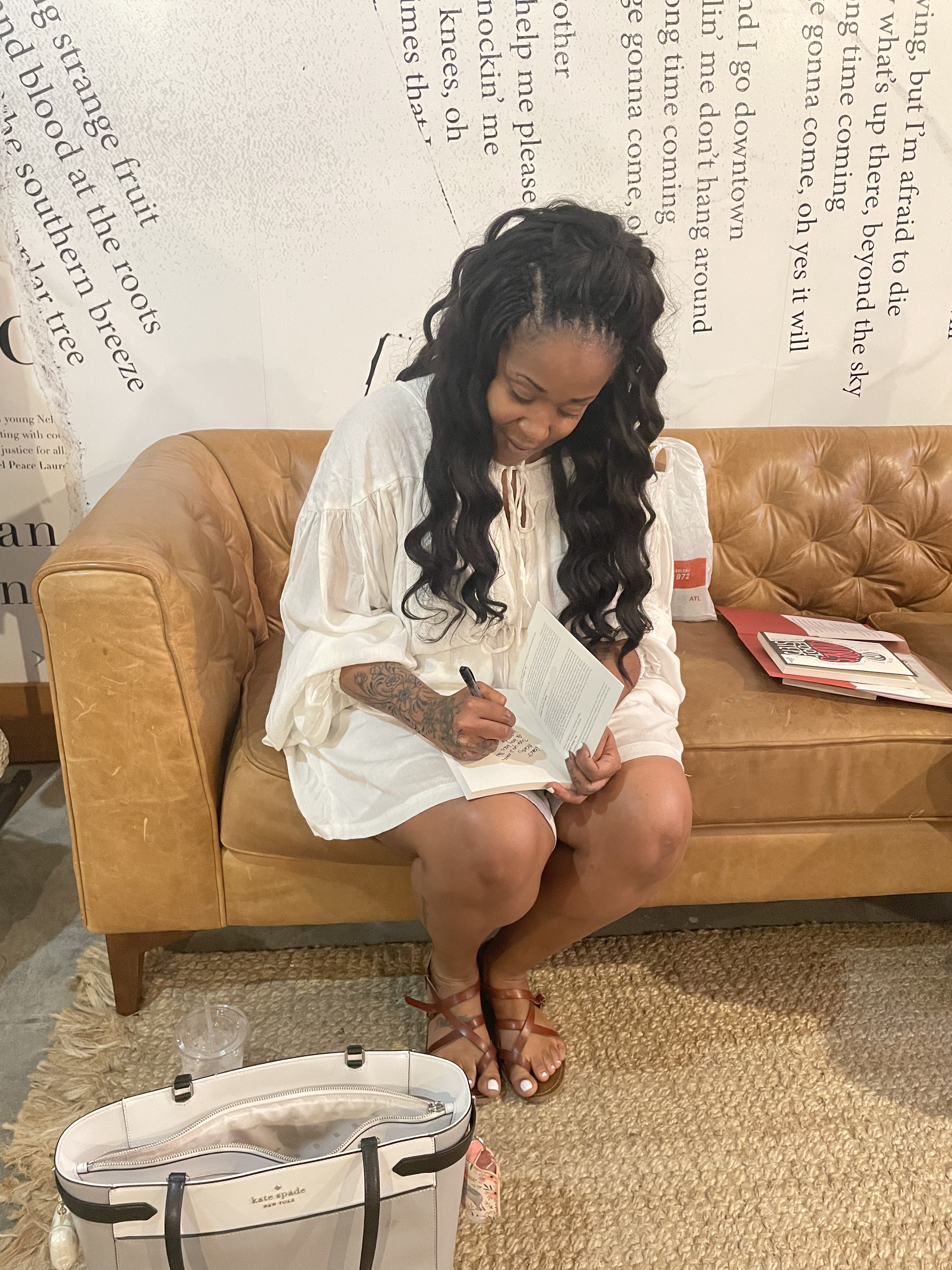
- Lewis in 2024
- Born: September 15, 1981 (age 45); Alliance, OH, United States
- Education: B.A., English, Robert Morris University (2003) M.A., English Literature, Ohio University (2005) Ph.D., American Studies, Purdue University (2011)
- Website: heidirlewis.com

Heidi R. Lewis is an American scholar of feminist theory and politics (emphasis on Black Feminism), Hip Hop (emphasis on Rap), and Critical Media Studies. She is Professor of Feminist & Gender Studies at Colorado College, Editor-in-Chief of Oxford Bibliographies in Gender & Women's Studies, and was the 22nd President of the National Women's Studies Association.

== Colorado College ==
In 2010, Lewis earned a dissertation fellowship in Feminist & Gender Studies at Colorado College through the Consortium for Faculty Diversity. After serving as Visiting Assistant Professor the following year, she entered the tenure track and earned tenure during the 2017-18 AY. She served as Director of Feminist & Gender Studies from 2016-22 AY, including terms as Interim and Associate Director.

She regularly teaches Introduction to Feminist & Gender Studies, Feminist Theory, Critical Media Studies, Black Feminist Theory, Black Feminist Media Studies, Black Feminist Literary Criticism, Hip Hop and Feminism, Hip Hop on Film, Hip Hop & the Law, and the department’s first study abroad course, Hidden Spaces, Hidden Narratives: Intersectionality Studies in Berlin.

== Books ==
Her first book, In Audre’s Footsteps: Transnational Kitchen Table Talk (edition assemblage, 2021), co-edited with Dana Asbury and Jazlyn Andrews, is the 7th volume in Sharon Dodua Otoo's Witnessed Series, an English-language book series about Black writers who have lived in Germany.

Recently, Lewis published Make Rappers Rap Again: Interrogating the Mumble Rap "Crisis" (Oxford UP, 2025). In this book, she argues Mumble Rap is real Hip Hop.
