= Lucy Buck =

American diarist

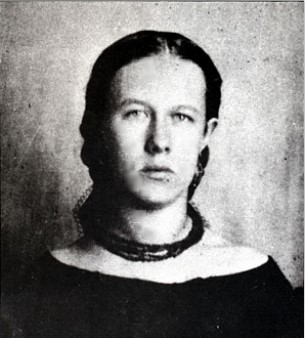
Portrait of Lucy Buck

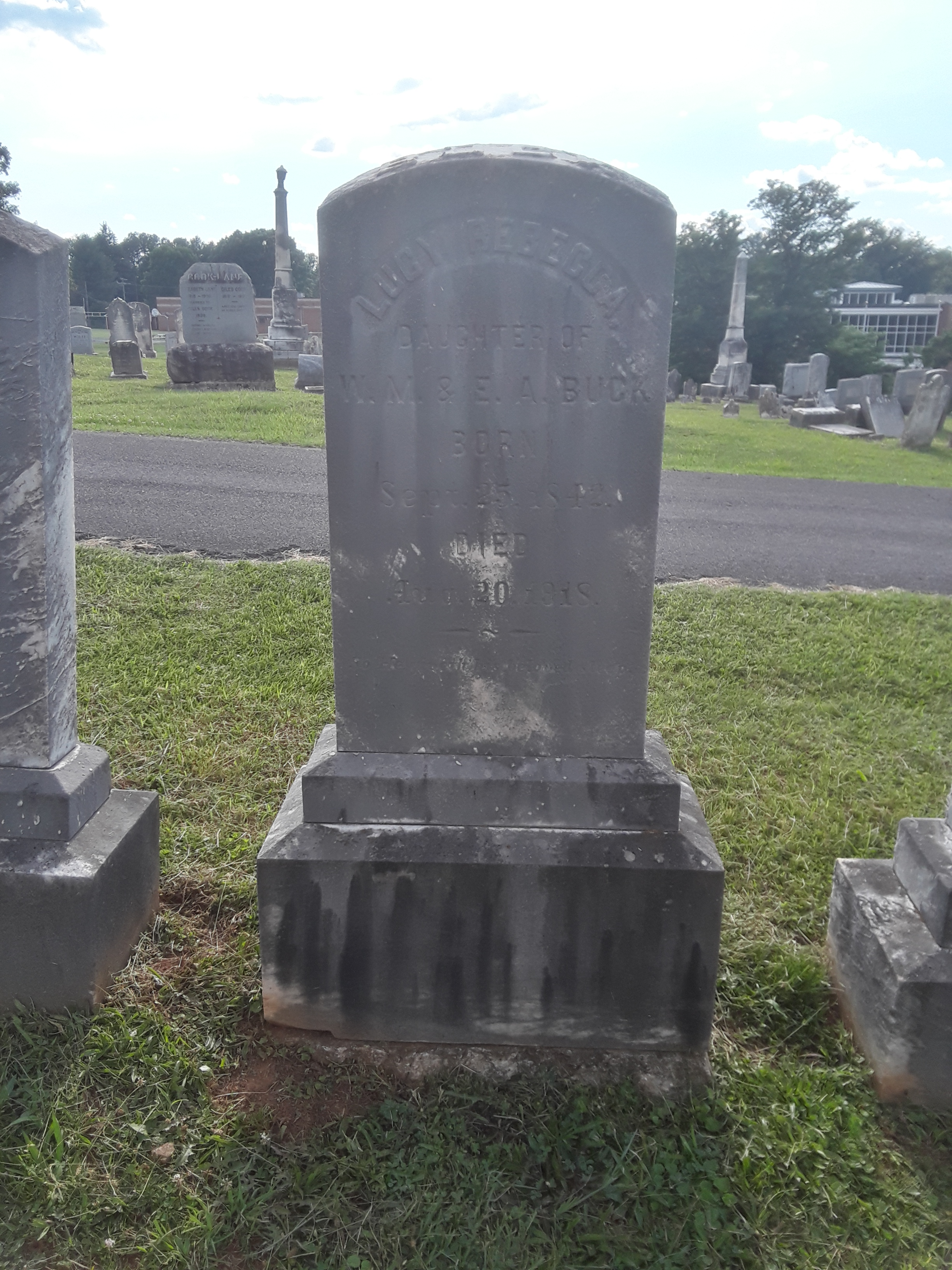
Lucy Buck's grave at Prospect Hill Cemetery, Front Royal

Lucy Rebecca Buck (September 25, 1842 – August 20, 1918) was an American diarist.

== Biography ==
Buck was a native of Warren County, Virginia, the third-born of thirteen children to William and Elizabeth Buck. She was descended from one of the earliest settlers in that region of the Shenandoah Valley. Her father was a merchant in Front Royal, and occupied an important position in local affairs.

Buck was educated locally, and by the time of the Civil War was an avid diarist; hers is one of five diaries from the Front Royal area which record the duration of the war and its effect on civilians. At the time, the Buck family lived at a house called Bel Air, which was less than a quarter of a mile from the town; her brothers Alvin and Irving joined the Confederate army, and she herself was an ardent Confederate partisan, an attitude reflected in much of her writing.

The Buck family witnessed numerous military engagements over the course of the war, due to Front Royal's strategic location; Lucy's diary contains her impressions and observations of many of these events, including of the Battle of Front Royal. She describes a visit paid by Robert E. Lee and his staff to Bel Air, during which she and her sister played and sang Southern songs at his request. Also detailed in the diary is the effect of the escape of the enslaved members of the household, who fled one night in 1863 and took with them the family's three horses; however Buck otherwise does not comment on the institution of slavery. The diary also contains glimpses into domestic life of the era: it lists the titles of novels she read, and describes the parlor games that were popular with her social set. Also described are such personal moments as family Christmas celebrations and ice skating lessons.

Remarkably, the Buck family suffered little during the war, despite the fierce fighting that went on in the vicinity of their home. Lucy herself remained a fervent Confederate until the end, recording her sorrow at the final defeat of the South in 1865. She kept fond memories of her encounter with Lee; during his time as president of Washington College she wrote to request a personal memento. In response he provided a uniform button, which he claimed he had worn throughout the fighting in Virginia. Buck died in 1918, and was buried in Front Royal's Prospect Hill Cemetery.

== Diary ==
Buck's diary, whose first entry is dated Christmas Day, 1861, is considered notable for the personal, civilian view it provides of the events of the Civil War in Virginia, particularly the rapid changes in fortune that occurred throughout the fighting. It also provides information on the effects the war had on a single family. The book has been published three times; in 1940, as Diary of Lucy Rebecca Buck; in 1973, as Sad Earth, Sweet Heaven; and in 1998, as Shadows on My Heart: The Civil War Diary of Lucy Rebecca Buck of Virginia.

The diary's reception has changed with different eras and audiences. A United Daughters of the Confederacy chapter in North Carolina held an event presenting a review of the 1973 edition; a newspaper write-up reported that “the theme running through 'Sad Earth, Sweet Heaven' is her Christian ability to meet the crises of war, illness and death of loved ones". Reviewing the 1998 edition, scholar Michelle Krowl said Buck's "diary vividly records the challenges she experienced in trying to live within a world that radically changed around her" but noted her attachment to the traditions of her upbringing. In another review of that edition, historian Marli F. Weiner noted that women diarists in this period usually wrote from “a context where it was assumed that their most appropriate behavior was silent and that children were expected to be their only legacy”; some women writers were beginning to challenge this view with published poems, plays and novels but faced substantial criticism for this departure from traditional roles, an issue particularly binding white women of the planter class. A diary like Buck's, Weiner wrote, threaded the needle between the injunction on a public presence and the desire, nevertheless, for literary self-expression.

Buck and her diary are remembered by a historical marker in the Civil War Trails series located near Bel Air, which still stands.
