= Łukasz =

Male given name

- Pronunciation: Polish: [ˈwukaʂ]
- Gender: Male
- Language: Polish

Origin
- Region of origin: Poland

Other names
- Related names: Lucas, Lukas, Luca, Lluc

Łukasz or Lukasz (pronounced [ˈwukaʂ]) is a Polish masculine given name, derived from Greek Λουκᾶς, Lukas.

Derived family names are Łukaszewski, Łukaszewicz/Łukasiewicz/Lukashevich, Lukash (as transliterated from Ukrainian), Lukashenko (Ukrainian).

== List of people with the name ==
=== A ===
- Łukasz Abgarowicz (born 1949), Polish politician

=== B ===
- Łukasz Banak (born 1983) Polish Greco-Roman wrestler
- Łukasz Baraniecki (1798–1858), Polish Catholic prelate
- Łukasz Bejger (born 2002), Polish footballer
- Łukasz Bocian (born 1988), Polish footballer
- Łukasz Bodnar (born 1982), Polish road bicycle racer
- Łukasz Bogusławski (born 1993), Polish footballer
- Łukasz Broź (born 1985), Polish footballer
- Łukasz Budziłek (born 1991), Polish footballer
- Lukasz Bujko (born 1986), Polish cyclist
- Łukasz Burliga (born 1988), Polish footballer

=== C ===
- Łukasz Chyła (born 1981), Polish sprinter
- Łukasz Cichos (born 1982), Polish football manager and former player
- Łukasz Ciepliński (1913–1951), Polish soldier who fought in the Polish anti-Nazi and anti-communist resistance movements
- Łukasz Cieślewicz (born 1987), Polish football player
- Łukasz Ciszek (born 1980), Polish para archer
- Łukasz Cyborowski (born 1980), Polish chess Grandmaster
- Łukasz Czapla (born 1982), Polish sport shooter, four-time world champion

=== D ===
- Łukasz Derbich (born 1983), Polish footballer
- Lukasz Dumanski (born 1983), Polish-Canadian professional poker player
- Łukasz Drzewiński (born 1984), Polish swimmer

=== F ===
- Łukasz Fabiański (born 1985), Polish footballer
- Łukasz Foltyn (born 1974), Polish programmer, creator of the Gadu-Gadu instant messenger

=== G ===
- Łukasz Gajda (born 2003), Polish footballer
- Łukasz Garguła (born 1981), Polish footballer
- Łukasz Gąsior (born 1986), Polish swimmer
- Łukasz Gierak (born 1988), Polish handball player
- Łukasz Gikiewicz (born 1987), Polish footballer
- Łukasz Gołębiowski (1773–1849), Polish ethnographer, historian, translator and librarian
- Łukasz Góra (born 1993), Polish footballer
- Łukasz Górnicki (1527–1603), Polish humanist, writer, secretary and chancellor of Sigismund August of Poland
- Lukasz "Dr. Luke" Gottwald (born 1973), American songwriter and record producer
- Łukasz Grzeszczuk (born 1990), Polish javelin thrower
- Łukasz Grzeszczyk (born 1987), Polish footballer
- Łukasz Gutkowski (born 1998), Polish modern pentathlete

=== H ===
- Łukasz Hanzel (born 1986), Polish footballer
- Łukasz Hirszowicz (1920–1993), Polish historian

=== J ===
- Łukasz Jamróz (born 1990), Polish footballer
- Łukasz Janik (born 1985), Polish professional boxer
- Łukasz Jankowski (born 1982), Polish motorcycle speedway rider
- Łukasz Janoszka (born 1987), Polish footballer
- Łukasz Jarmuła (born 1998), Polish chess Grandmaster
- Łukasz Jarosiewicz (born 1981), Polish footballer
- Łukasz Jarosiński (born 1988), Polish footballer
- Łukasz Jarosz (born 1979), Polish Heavyweight kickboxer and martial artist
- Łukasz Jasiński (born 1985), Polish footballer
- Łukasz Jaworski (born 1981), Polish film and television director
- Łukasz Jóźwiak, Polish ice dancer, former partner of Paulina Urban
- Lukasz Jogalla, Polish-American cinematographer
- Łukasz Juszkiewicz (born 1983), Polish footballer

=== K ===
- Łukasz Kacprzycki (born 1994), Polish footballer
- Łukasz Kaczmarek (born 1994) is a Polish volleyball player
- Łukasz Kadziewicz (born 1980), Polish volleyball player
- Łukasz Kaliński (1578–1634), Catholic prelate
- Łukasz Kamiński (born 1973), Polish historian, specializing in history of Poland after 1945
- Łukasz Karwowski (born 1965), Polish film director, screenwriter and producer
- Lukasz Kieloch (born 1976), Polish-German water polo player
- Łukasz Kohut (born 1982), Polish politician
- Łukasz Kolenda (born 1999), Polish basketball player
- Łukasz Kominiak (born 1990), Polish footballer
- Łukasz Konarzewski (born 1955), Polish art historian
- Łukasz Konieczny (born 1985), Polish singer (operatic bass)
- Łukasz Kopka (born 1996), Polish footballer
- Łukasz Kosakiewicz (born 1990), Polish footballer
- Łukasz Koszarek (born 1984), Polish basketball player
- Łukasz Kowalski (born 1980), Polish football manager and former player
- Łukasz Kozub (born 1997), Polish volleyball player
- Łukasz Kośmicki (born 1968), Polish cinematographer, screenwriter and director
- Łukasz Krakowczyk (born 1998), Polish footballer
- Łukasz Krawczuk (born 1989), Polish sprinter
- Łukasz Kruczek (born 1975), Polish ski jumper
- Łukasz Krupadziorow (born 1989), Polish heavyweight kickboxer
- Łukasz Krupiński (born 1992), Polish pianist
- Łukasz Krzycki (born 1984), Polish footballer
- Łukasz Kubik (born 1978), Polish footballer
- Łukasz Kubot (born 1982), Polish tennis player
- Łukasz Kuczyński (born 1999), Polish short track speed skater
- Lukasz Kurgan (born 1975), Polish-Canadian bioinformatician
- Łukasz Kuropaczewski (born 1981), Polish classical guitarist
- Łukasz Kwiatkowski (1982–2018), Polish cyclist

=== L ===
- Łukasz Labuch, Polish Paralympic athlete
- Łukasz Łakomy (born 2001), Polish footballer
- Łukasz Leja, Polish-born American painter
- Łukasz Litewka (1989–2026), Polish politician and sociologist
- Łukasz Łuczaj (born 1972), Polish botanist and professor of biological sciences

=== M ===
- Łukasz Madej (born 1982), Polish footballer
- Łukasz Maliszewski (born 1985), Polish football manager and former player
- Łukasz Mamczarz (born 1988), Polish Paralympic athlete
- Łukasz Masiak (ca. 1983–2015), Polish investigative journalist
- Łukasz Maszczyk (born 1984), Polish amateur boxer
- Łukasz Matusiak (born 1985), Polish footballer
- Łukasz Merda (born 1980), Polish footballer
- Łukasz Michalski (born 1988), Polish pole vaulter
- Łukasz Miedzik (born 1991), Polish bobsledder
- Łukasz Mierzejewski (born 1982), Polish footballer
- Łukasz Moneta (born 1994), Polish footballer
- Łukasz Moreń (born 1986), Polish badminton player

=== N ===
- Łukasz Nawotczyński (born 1982), Polish footballer
- Łukasz Niedziałek (born 2000), Polish race walker
- Łukasz Nowak (born 1988), Polish race walker

=== O ===
- Łukasz Obrzut (born 1982), Polish-American basketball player
- Łukasz Opaliński (1581–1654), Polish–Lithuanian nobleman
- Łukasz Opaliński (1612–1666), Polish nobleman
- Łukasz Orbitowski (born 1977), Polish essayist and writer
- Łukasz Owsian (born 1990), Polish racing cyclist

=== P ===
- Łukasz Palkowski (born 1976), Polish film director and screenwriter
- Łukasz Parszczyński (born 1985), Polish runner
- Łukasz Paulewicz (born 1983), Polish footballer
- Łukasz Pawlikowski (born 1997), Polish cellist.
- Łukasz Pawłowski (born 1983), Polish rower
- Łukasz Perłowski (born 1984), Polish volleyball player
- Łukasz Pielorz (born 1983), Polish footballer
- Łukasz Pieniążek (born 1990), Polish rally driver
- Łukasz Piszczek (born 1985), Polish footballer
- Łukasz Piątek (born 1985), Polish footballer
- Łukasz Pławecki (born 1987), Polish kickboxer and boxer
- Łukasz Podolski (born 1985), German footballer of Polish descent
- Łukasz Podolski (cyclist) (born 1980), Polish professional road cyclist
- Łukasz Polański (born 989), Polish volleyball player
- Łukasz Poręba (born 2000), Polish footballer
- Łukasz Prokorym (born 1985), Polish politician
- Łukasz Przybytek (born 1989), Polish sailor

=== R ===
- Łukasz Rajchelt (born 1999), Polish volleyball player
- Łukasz Rogulski (born 1993), Polish handball player
- Łukasz Romanek (1983–2006), Polish speedway rider
- Łukasz Rostkowski, aka L.U.C., Polish rapper and music producer
- Łukasz Różański (born 1986), Polish professional boxer
- Łukasz Różycki, Polish pair skater who skated with Aneta Kowalska
- Łukasz Rutkowski (born 1988), Polish ski jumper
- Łukasz Rzepecki (born 1992), Polish politician and lawyer

=== S ===
- Łukasz Sapela (born 1982), Polish footballer
- Łukasz Schreiber (born 1987), Polish politician
- Łukasz Sekulski (born 1990), Polish footballer
- Łukasz Seweryn (born 1982), Polish basketball player
- Łukasz Siemion (born 1985), Polish rower
- Łukasz Sierpina (born 1988), Polish footballer
- Łukasz Simlat (born 1977), Polish actor
- Łukasz Skorupski (born 1991), Polish footballer
- Łukasz Skowron (born 1991), Polish former footballer
- Łukasz Skrzyński (born 1978), Polish footballer
- Łukasz Słonina (born 1989), Polish biathlete
- Łukasz Sosin (born 1977), Polish footballer
- Łukasz Sówka (born 1993), former speedway rider
- Łukasz Starowicz (born 1976), Polish snowboarder
- Łukasz Sułkowski (born 1972), Polish professor of economic sciences
- Łukasz Surma (born 1977), Polish footballer
- Łukasz Szczoczarz (born 1984), Polish footballer
- Łukasz Szczurek (born 1988), Polish biathlete
- Łukasz Szukała (born 1984), Polish footballer
- Łukasz Szumowski (born 1972), Polish cardiologist, former Minister of Health

=== T ===
- Łukasz Targosz (born1977), Polish film composer and music producer
- Łukasz Teodorczyk (born 1991), Polish footballer
- Łukasz Trałka (born 1984), Polish footballer
- Łukasz Tumicz (born 1985), Polish footballer
- Łukasz Tupalski (born 1980), Polish footballer
- Łukasz Turzyniecki (born 1994), Polish footballer
- Łukasz Tymiński (born 1990), Polish footballer

=== U ===
- Łukasz Uhma (born 1954), Polish gymnast
- Łukasz Urban (1979–2016), Polish lorry driver, kidnapped and killed by terrorist Anis Amri in the 2016 Berlin truck attack
- Łukasz Uszalewski (born 1988), Polish defender

=== W ===
- Łukasz Wacławski (born 1980), Polish entrepreneur and professional darts player
- Łukasz Wiech (born 1997), Polish footballer
- Łukasz Krzysztof Wielewiejski (1660–1743), Roman Catholic prelate
- Łukasz Wietecki (born 1984), Polish para-triathlete
- Łukasz Wiśniewski (born 1989), Polish volleyball player
- Łukasz Wiśniowski (born 1991), Polish racing cyclist
- Łukasz Wójcik, Polish glider pilot
- Łukasz Wójt (born 13 May 1982), Polish swimmer
- Łukasz Wolsztyński (born 1994), Polish footballer
- Łukasz Woszczyński (born 1983), Polish sprint canoeist
- Łukasz Wroński (born 1994), Polish footballer
- Łukasz Wybieralski (born 1975 , Polish field hockey player

=== Z ===
- Łukasz Zakreta (born 1991), Polish handball player
- Łukasz Zakrzewski (born 1984), Polish sailor
- Łukasz Zalewski (born 1977), Polish competitive ice dancer
- Łukasz Załuska (born 1982), Polish footballer
- Łukasz Zbonikowski (born 1978), Polish politician
- Łukasz Zejdler (born 1992), Polish footballer
- Łukasz Zgiep (born 1988), Polish entrepreneur
- Łukasz Zjawiński (born 2001), Polish footballer
- Łukasz Zwoliński (born 1993), Polish footballer
- Łukasz Żal (born 1981), Polish cinematographer
- Łukasz Żegleń (born 1995), Polish footballer
- Łukasz Żygadło (born 1979), Polish volleyball player

== See also ==
- Tournament in Łukasz Romanek Memory, annual motorcycle speedway event held each year organized by the RKM Rybnik
- Lucas
- Lukas
