= Lukaszewski =

Łukaszewski is a Polish surname. It is derived from the given name Łukasz, the Polish form of Lucas.

Notable people with the name include:

- David Lukaszewski, American poker player
- Ewelina Lukaszewska, Polish actress
- James Lukaszewski, American crisis management consultant
- Paweł Łukaszewski, Polish composer
- Jerzy Łukaszewski, Polish diplomat
- Marcin Łukaszewski (footballer), Polish footballer
- Marcin Łukaszewski (musician), Polish composer
- Wiesław Łukaszewski, Polish psychologist
- Witold Łukaszewski, Polish guitarist
- Wojciech Łukaszewski, Polish composer

== See also ==
- 16090 Lukaszewski, a comet
- Ashley Lukashevsky, American illustrator
