= Foltyn =

Foltyn is a surname. Notable people with the surname include:

- Hanna Foltyn-Kubicka (born 1950), Polish politician and a Member of the European Parliament
- Łukasz Foltyn (born 1974), Polish programmer
- Michael Foltýn (born 1994), Czech ice hockey player
- Martin Foltýn (born 1993), Czech football player
- Stanisław Fołtyn (1936–2003), Polish footballer
