= Łukasiewicz =

Łukasiewicz is a Polish surname. It comes from the given name Łukasz (Lucas). It is found across Poland, particularly in central regions. It is related to the surnames Łukaszewicz and Lukashevich.

Language	Surname
Polish	Łukasiewicz; Polish pronunciation: [wukaˈɕɛvitʂ]
Russian (Romanization)	Лукасевич (Lukasevich, Lukasevitch)
Ukrainian (Romanization)	Лукасевич (Lukasevych, Lukasevyč)

== People ==
- Antoni Łukasiewicz (born 1983), Polish footballer
- Christophe Lukasiewicz (1933–1999), Polish-French architect
- Ignacy Łukasiewicz (1822–1882), Polish pharmacist and first distiller of clear kerosene
- Jakub Ignacy Łaszczyński (1791–1865), Polish regional administrator
- Jan Łukasiewicz (1878–1956), Polish logician and philosopher
- Józef Michał Łukasiewicz, Polish merchant and politician
- Juliusz Łukasiewicz (1892–1951), Polish diplomat
- Mark Lukasiewicz (born 1973), American baseball player
- Milena Łukasiewicz, Polish diplomat
- Piotr Łukasiewicz (born 1954), sociologist, Acting Minister of Culture and Art of Poland (1992–1993)
- Piotr Łukasiewicz (born 1972), diplomat, Polish ambassador to Afghanistan (2012–2014)
