= Marcin Łukaszewski =

Marcin Łukaszewski may refer to:

- Marcin Łukaszewski (footballer)
- Marcin Łukaszewski (musician)
