= Matusiak =

Matusiak is a Polish surname. Notable people with the surname include:

- Bogumiła Matusiak (born 1971), Polish cyclist
- Łukasz Matusiak (born 1985), Polish footballer
- Radosław Matusiak (born 1982), Polish footballer
- Wojciech Matusiak (born 1945), Polish cyclist
