= Maliszewski =

Maliszewski (Polish pronunciation: [maliˈʂɛfski]; feminine: Maliszewska; plural: Maliszewscy) is a surname of Polish-language origin. It is a toponymic surname associated with one of the places in Poland named Maliszew, Maliszewo, or Maliszów.

the Lithuanianized version is Mališauskas. The Russian-language versions of the surnames are Malishevsky (masculine), Malishevskaya (feminine).

Notable people with this surname include:

- Anna Maliszewska (born 1993), Polish modern pentathlete
- Karol Maliszewski (born 1960), Polish poet, prose writer, literary critic
- Natalia Maliszewska (born 1995), Polish short track speed skater
- Patrycja Maliszewska (born 1988), Polish short-track speed skater
- Łukasz Maliszewski (born 1985) Polish footballer
- Mirosław Maliszewski (born 1968), Polish politician
- Stas Maliszewski (born 1944), American football player
- Witold Maliszewski (1873–1939), Polish composer
- Nadir Malishevsky (1918–1977), Soviet film and stage actor
