= Juszkiewicz =

Juszkiewicz is a Polish-language surname. It has variants in other languages, such as Yushkevich.

Language	Masculine	Feminine
Polish	Juszkiewicz ([juʂˈkjɛvit͡ʂ])	
American	Juskowich	
Belarusian (Romanization)	Юшкевіч (Juškievič, Yushkievich)	
Latvian	Juškevičs, Juškēvičs	Juškeviča, Juškēviča
Lithuanian	Juškevičius	Juškevičienė (married); Juškevičiūtė (unmarried)
Russian (Romanization)	Юшкевич (Yushkevich, Iushkevich)	
Ukrainian (Romanization)	Юшкевич (Yushkevych, Iushkevych)	

== People ==
- Henry Juszkiewicz (born 1953), American chief executive
- Łukasz Juszkiewicz (born 1983), Polish footballer
- Roman Juszkiewicz (1952–2012), Polish astrophysicist
- Ewa Juszkiewicz (born 1984), painter
