= Merda =

Merda may refer to:

- The Latin word for excrement, used as a swear word in various languages
- Marda, Salfit (Merda being the old Western name of this West Bank village)
- Charles-André Merda, French soldier
- Łukasz Merda, Polish football goalkeeper
