= Pawlikowski =

Pawlikowski (feminine Pawlikowska) is a Polish surname. Notable people with this surname include:

- Adam Pawlikowski (1925–1976), Polish film actor
- Aniela Pawlikowska, Polish artist
- Ellen M. Pawlikowski (born 1956), commander of the Space and Missile Systems Center of the United States' Air Force Space Command
- John T. Pawlikowski (born 1940), Servite priest and Professor of Social Ethics at the Catholic Theological Union
- Józef Pawlikowski (1767–1828), Polish noble
- Łukasz Pawlikowski (born 1997), Polish cellist
- Maciej Pawlikowski (born 1953), Polish mountaineer
- Maria Pawlikowska-Jasnorzewska, Polish poet
- Paweł Pawlikowski (born 1957), Polish BAFTA Award-winning filmmaker
- Zoogz Rift (born Robert Pawlikowski; 1953–2011), musician, painter and professional wrestling personality
