= Łukaszewicz =

Łukaszewicz is a Polish surname. It comes from the given name Łukasz (Lucas). It is most frequent in north-eastern Poland. Archaic feminine forms: Łukaszewiczówna (unmarried) and Łukaszewiczówa (married).

Related surnames: Łukasiewicz and Lukashevich.

Language	Masculine	Feminine
Polish	Łukaszewicz ([wukaˈʂɛvit͡ʂ])	
Belarusian (Romanization)	Лукашэвіч (Lukaševič, Lukashevich)	
Latvian	Lukaševičs, Lukašēvičs	Lukaševiča, Lukašēviča
Lithuanian	Lukaševičius	Lukaševičienė (married); Lukaševičiūtė (unmarried)
Russian (Romanization)	Лукашевич (Lukashevich, Lukashevitch)	
Ukrainian (Romanization)	Лукашевич (Lukashevych, Lukaševyč)	

== People ==
- Bronisława Łukaszewicz (1885–1962), Polish-Lithuanian painter
- Jolanta Łukaszewicz (born 1966), Polish sprint canoer
- Józef Łukaszewicz (1863–1928), Polish scientist and revolutionary
- Julian Łukaszewicz (1904–1982), Polish athlete
- Olgierd Łukaszewicz (born 1946), Polish film actor
- Wacław Łukaszewicz (1927–2014), Polish scout leader
