= Lukash =

Lukash is a gender-neutral Slavic surname. It is also a Slavic form of the given name Luka, cf. "Lukáš". The surname Lukashenko is derived from it. Notable people with the name include:

== Surname ==
- Konstantin Lukash
- Mykola Lukash (1919–1988), Ukrainian literary translator, theorist, and lexicographer
- Nikolai Lukash (1796–1868), Russian general and politician
- Olena Lukash (born 1976), Ukrainian jurist and politician

== Given name ==
- Lukash Divish, Slovak-Russian volleyball player
- Lukash Dzekut-Malei (1888–1955), Belarusian Baptist pastor, national and independence activist, social figure, and translator of the Bible
