= Łukasz Kuropaczewski =

Polish musician

- Born: Łukasz Kuropaczewski; 21 August 1981 (age 45); Gniezno, Poland
- Occupation: Musician

Łukasz Kuropaczewski (born 21 August 1981 in Gniezno) is a Polish musical artist.

== Career ==
Lukasz Kuropaczewski started playing the guitar at the age of 10. Since 1992, his musical education was conducted by Professor Piotr Zaleski from Poland and he later continued his education at the Peabody Conservatory of Johns Hopkins University in Baltimore, MD, USA, where he studied with Manuel Barrueco and received an Artist Diploma.

Kuropaczewski has toured in Europe, the United States, Canada, South America and Japan. He has appeared in music centres in Czechia, Belarus, Germany, France, Spain, Belgium, Hungary, Poland, Canary Islands, Iceland, Greece, the UK, and Panama.

He has performed solo recitals in London's Royal Festival Hall, the Concertgebouw in Amsterdam, Warsaw's National Philharmonic Hall, Tchaikovsky Hall in Moscow, Caramoor Music Festival, Santa Fe Chamber Music Festival and New York's Carnegie Hall.

As a chamber music collaborator, he works with musicians such as the Orion String Quartet, Avi Avital, Chen Reiss, Richard Galliano, The Verona Quartet and musicians from the Cleveland Orchestra, the Los Angeles Symphony Orchestra, and the San Antonio Symphony.

He regularly premieres new works for guitar: “Acequias,” by Marc Neikrug and his “Three Pieces for Guitar” at the Baltimore Museum of Art in Baltimore, MD. He has premiered concertos by Angelo Gilardino, Krzysztof Meyer, Mikolaj Gorecki, and Alexandre Tansman (Polish premiere) and he made the guitar version of Krzysztof Penderecki’s Viola Concerto and premiered it with Sinfonia Varsovia, Puerto Rico Symphony and the Chile Symphony Orchestra and conductor Maximiano Valdes.

Kuropaczewski served as guitar faculty at the University of Pennsylvania in Philadelphia, USA from 2008-2010. He is currently on the faculty of the Academy of Music in Poznan, Poland, and the Kunst University Graz, Austria. He holds a doctorate degree in performance.

== Discography ==
- "Adela" with Aleksander Dębicz, Łukasz Kuropaczewski, Jakub Józef Orliński on Warner Classics
- "Łukasz" on Tonar Music
- "Modern Soul" with Maciej Frackiewicz, Grzegorz Skrobinski, Marek Bracha, Agata Szymczewska, Lukasz Kuropaczewski on CD Accord
- "Nocturnal" Fryderyk Award Nomination “Best Solo Album” Polish Radio, 2012
- "Concierto de Aranjuez"
- "Aqua e Vinho" Fryderyk Award Nomination “Best Chamber Music Album” Polish Radio, 2010
- "Łukasz Kuropaczewski: Portrait" Fryderyk Award Nomination ”Best Polish Music Album” Polish Radio 2008
- "Spanish Music"
- "Łukasz Kuropaczewski - Recital"

== Publications ==
- E. Schrimer - "Three Pieces for Guitar" by M. Neikrug
- Hans Sikorski Verlag - "Triptych Sonata" by K. Meyer
- Schott- "Aria and Cadenza" by K. Penderecki
- Schott- "Viola Concerto for Guitar" by K. Penderecki

== Awards and nominations ==
- Fryderyk Award Nomination as “Best Solo Album” for "Nocturnal" (2012)
- Fryderyk Award Nomination as “Best Chamber Music Album” for "Aqua e Vinho" (2010)
- Fryderyk Award Nomination as “Best Polish Music Album” for "Polish Music" (2008)
- Kuropaczewski received the "Meritorius for Polish Culture" medal in recognition of his distinguished cultural contribution, awarded by the Ministry of Culture and National Heritage in Poland.
