= Musica Sacra (Warsaw) =

Polish choir (2002-)

The Musica Sacra choir is a Polish. It was founded in 2002 and sings at Warsaw's St. Florian's Cathedral. Acclaimed Polish composer Paweł Łukaszewski directs the choir (Wordsworth 2013, p 50). The choir has recorded 8 CDs and has been nominated several times for Poland's most prestigious musical award, the Fryderyk Award. The choir's most recent award was in 2016 for Musica Caelestis. Its first Fryderyk Award occurred in 2011.
