= Łukasz Konieczny =

Polish operatic bass

- Born: 13 March 1985 (age 41); Łódź, Poland
- Occupation: Operatic bass
- Website: lukaszkonieczny.eu

Łukasz Konieczny (born 13 March 1985) is a Polish operatic bass. Between 2011 and 2019, he was a soloist of Düsseldorf Opera House. From 2019 to 2020, he performed at the Grand Theatre–National Opera in Warsaw.

Konieczny is the brother of Tomasz Konieczny, also an opera singer.

== Early life and education ==
Łukasz Konieczny graduated from the Karol Lipiński Academy of Music in Wrocław, Poland. He took part in numerous master classes conducted by such opera singers and teachers as Christian Elsner, Deborah Polaski, David Syrus, Jane Henschel, Linda Watson, and Franz Grundheber. Konieczny also took part in acting classes at the Internationale Filmschule Köln in Cologne, Germany.

== Career ==
He started his career in Germany as a member of the Opera Studio at Düsseldorf Opera House. In the season 2011/2012, he became a full-time soloist of the Düsseldorf Opera House. He is a frequent performer of the Wagnerian repertoire, including interpretation of Fafner in the Das Rheingold and the Siegfried, likewise as Hunding in the Valkyrie.

The role of Polyphemus in the stage premiere of Acis and Galatea by Handel during the Händel Festival in Halle 2013 was a milestone in the artist’s career. In the same year, he also performed with the interpretation of the bass part in Stravinsky's Les Noces at the Klavier-Festival Ruhr, and a year later he took part in the performance of the Penderecki’s Polish Requiem during the Festival of Polish Music in Kraków. In 2015, Konieczny made his debut as Rocco in Beethoven's opera Fidelio at the Mainfranken Theater in Würzburg.

He played Doctor Behrens in the world premiere of the opera Magic Mountain by Paweł Mykietyn, based on Thomas Mann's novel during the Malta Festival 2015 in Poznań. In 2017, Konieczny has made his debut as Banco in Verdi's Macbeth at Theater Aachen and as Barone Douphol in Verdi's Traviata at the Bavarian State Opera in Munich during the Munich Opera Festival 2017. In the same year performed in Mozart's Requiem at Théâtre du Capitole Toulouse.

In 2017/2018, Konieczny made his debut at Dresden Opera (Semperoper Dresden) as Crespel and Luther in Offenbach's Les Contes d'Hoffmann. In 2018, he took part in the world premiere of Aleksander Nowak's opera ahat-ilī – sister of gods to the libretto by Olga Tokarczuk at the Sacrum Profanum 2018 festival. In 2019, as part of The Year of Stanisław Moniuszko, he presented songs of this composer at the Grand Theater–National Opera.

During the season 2018/2019, he performed as Sparafucile in Verdi's Rigoletto, Skołuba in Moniuszko's The Haunted Manor, Faust and Inquisitore in Prokofiev's The Fiery Angel. He also made guest appearances at the Düsseldorf Opera House as Fafner in Das Rheingold and the Siegfried, and as Hunding in the Valkyrie by Wagner. At the Dramma per musica festival, Warsaw, he played the role of Polifema in Handel’s Aci, Galatea e Polifemo.

His repertoire includes more than fifty opera roles, among others Bartolo in The Marriage of Figaro, Masetto and Commander in Don Giovanni, Zuniga in Bizet's Carmen, Bonzo in Madame Butterfly, Tom in Un ballo in maschera, Il Re in Aida by Verdi, Minotaurus in Ariane Martinů.

Konieczny also regularly performs in concerts.

== Awards ==
He was awarded a special prize during the International Song Contest in Istanbul, in 2010.
