= Paweł Łukaszewski =

Polish composer (born 1968)

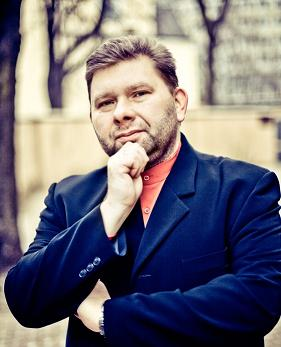
- Born: September 19, 1968 (age 58); Częstochowa, Poland
- Education: Fryderyk Chopin University of Music
- Occupations: Composer, Conductor, Professor
- Known for: Founded and Conducts Musica Sacra, prolific composer
- Style: Sacred Choral, renewed tonality
- Awards: Fryderyk Award (2016-composer); (2016-conductor); (2011-composer); (2011-conductor); (2008-composer); (2005-conductor); (1999-composer)

Paweł Łukaszewski (born 19 September 1968) is a Polish composer of contemporary classical music. He has won seven Fryderyk Awards. According to David Wordsworth, Łukaszewski is the best-known Polish composer of his generation in and out of Poland "by far" (Wordsworth 2013, p. 50).

== Biography ==
Paweł Łukaszewski was born on September 19, 1968, in Częstochowa. His father was the composer Wojciech Łukaszewski. He is the brother of the composer Marcin Łukaszewski.

Regarding Łukaszewski's musical style, acclaimed Polish music scholar Adrian Thomas states, "Paweł Łukaszewski (b. 1968) [is] best known for his resolutely anti-modern sacred choral music."

Also an active conductor, Łukaszewski is Artistic Director and Conductor of the Musica Sacra choir in Warsaw. His works have been recorded on more than 50 CD albums. Łukaszewski was the composer-in-residence of the Warsaw Philharmonic in 2011/2012. He is currently a composition professor at the Fryderyk Chopin University of Music and Szczecin Academy of Art.

As a composer his music has appeared on 4 CDs that have won a Fryderyk Award: 1999, 2008, 2011, and 2016. His music was nominated in 2001, 2002, 2003, 2004 and 2005. As the conductor of Musica Sacra he has won the Fryderyk Award three times: in 2005, 2011, and 2016.

== Education ==
=== Degrees ===
- Academy of Music, Warsaw: M.A. Cello Performance, prof. Andrzej Wróbel (1992)
- Academy of Music, Warsaw: M.A. Composition with Distinction, prof. Marian Borkowski (1995)
- Art Management School, Adam Mickiewicz University, Poznan: Degree with Distinction (1994)
- Academy of Music, Bydgoszcz: Post-Graduate Degree Choirmaster with Distinction (1996)
- Fryderyk Chopin University of Music, Warsaw: Ph.D. Composition 2000, promotor: prof. Marian Borkowski
- Fryderyk Chopin University of Music, Warsaw: Ph.D. Hab. Composition (2007)

=== Additional education ===
- Summer Courses for Young Composers, Kazimierz Dolny (1992, 1993)
- Summer Contemporary Music Courses with Prof. Bogusław Schaeffer, Kraków (1993)

== List of compositions and arrangements ==
=== 1. Oratorios ===
- "Via crucis" (2000)
- "Symphony No. 2 (Festinemus amare homines)" (2005)
- "Symphony No. 1 (Symphony of Providence)" (2008)
- "Symphony No. 3 (Symphony of Angels)" (2010)
- "Missa de Maria a Magdala" (2010)
- "Vesperae pro defunctis" (2011)
- "Resurrectio" (2012)

=== 2. Vocal-Instrumental ===
- "Dominum benedicite in aeternum..." (1994)
- "Recordationes de Christo moriendo" (1996)
- "Gaudium et Spes" (1997)
- "Missa pro Patria" (1998)
- "Litanae de Sancto Clemente" (2001)
- "Elogium" (2002)
- "Exsultet" (2003)
- "Litanae de Sanctis Marthyris" (2003)
- "Messa per voci e fiati" (2004)
- "Magnificat and Nunc dimittis" (2007)
- "Terra nova et caelum novum" (2007)
- "Et expecto resurrectionem mortuorum" (2008)
- "Miserere" (2008)
- "Laudate Dominum" (2009)
- "Luctus Mariae" (2010)
- "Pięć żałobnych pieśni kurpiowskich" (2010)

=== 3. Choral ===
- "Modlitwa do Matki Boskiej Gromnicznej" (1988)
- "Four poems" (1989)
- "Ave Maria" (1992)
- "Tu es Petrus" (1992)
- "Ostatni list św. Maksymiliana do Matki" (1993)
- "Modlitwa za Ojczyznę" (1994)
- "Stabat Mater" (1994)
- "Angelus Domini" (1995)
- "Two lenten motets" (1995)
  - No. 1 'Memento mei, Domine'
  - No. 2 'Crucem tuam adoramus, Domine'
- "Antiphonae (O Antiphones, A Cycle in 7 Parts)" (1999)
- "Jesu Christi prostrationes" (1999)
- "Two motets for Christmas" (2000)
- "Kolędy (Christmas carols)" (2001)
- "Hommage á Edith Stein" (2002)
- "Ave maris stella" (2003)
- "Psalmus 102" (2003)
- "Veni creator" (2004)
- "Beatus vir (cycle - 8 parts)" (2007)
- "Nunc dimittis" (2007)
- "Terra nova et caelum novum" (2007)
- "Two funeral psalms" (2008)
- "5 Funeral Kurpian songs" (2009)
- "Salve Regina" (2009)
- "Cena Domini" (2010)
- "Responsoria Tenebrae" (2010)
- "Ave Maria, gratia plena" (2011)
- "Lamentationes" (2011)
- "Motette" (2011)
- "Three orthodox prayers" (2012)

=== 4. Orchestral ===
- "Arrampicata" (1992)
- "Winterreise" (1993)
- "Organ concerto" (1996)
- "Sinfonietta" (2004)
- "Concerto for string orchestra" (2006)
- "Divertimento" (2006)
- "Trinity concerto" (2006)
- "Genome" (2008)
- "Piano concerto" (2008)
- "Utopia" (2008)
- "Adagietto" (2009)

=== 5. Chamber ===
- "Quasi Sonata" (1991)
- "String Quartet No. 1" (1994)
- "String Quartet No. 2" (2000)
- "String Quartet No. 3" (2004)
- "Pearl of Wisdom" (2005)
- "Concertino for Piano and Brass" (2007)
- "Un Cadeau" (2007)
- "Piano Trio" (2008)
- "Concertino for Organ and Brass" (2009)
- "Lenten music" (2011)

=== 6. Solo ===
- "Capriccio for P.P." (1991)
- "Two Preludies" (1992)
- "Stadium" (2002)
- "Moai" (2003)
- "Souvenirs (Cycle in 5 Parts)" (2007)
- "Icon" (2010)

=== 7. Songs ===
- "Three Songs (words by Maria Pawlikowska-Jasnorzewska)" (1992)
- "8 Songs for Children" (1993)
- "Aragena (words by Stanislaw Lem)" (1993)
- "Two Sacred Songs" (1997)
- "Two Songs (words by Czeslaw Milosz)" (2000)
- "Haiku - Four Songs" (2002)
- "Dwa sonety po śmierci" (2010)
- "Luctus Mariae" (2012)

=== 8. Liturgical ===
- "Jubilate Deo" (1996)
- "Pieśni" (2000)
- "Offertorium" (2004)
- "Sacerdos et Pontifex" (2008)

=== 9. For Tape ===
- "One week in London" (1992)
- "The Dusk" (1993)

=== 10. Pedagogical ===
- "Cadenza" (1985)
- "Akwarele" (1986)
- "Impresje kurpiowskie" (1988)
- "Two Pieces for Children's Choir" (2002)
- "Małe Concertino No. 1" (2008)
- "Małe Concertino No. 2" (2010)
- "Aria" (2012)

=== 11. Theatre and Film Music ===
- "Le jeux de l’amour et du hasard" (1992)
- "Hałda" (1993)

=== 12. Arrangements ===
- "Barka" (2002)
- "Lutoslawski's Lord Tennyson Song" (2006)
- "Lutoslawski's Songs for Mixed Choir" (2006)
- "Gorzkie żale by Stanislaw Moryto" (2008)
- "Litania do Madonny Treblinskiej by Wojciech Lukaszewski" (2008)

== Awards ==
- First Prize, Frédéric Chopin Academy of Music Competition for Arrampicata
- Second Prize, Young Composers Forum in Kraków for Winterreise
- Award from the President of Czestochowa for his entire musical output
- Second Prize, Adam Didur competition in Sanok for Recordationes de Christo moriendo
- Second Prize, Florilege Vocal de Tours Competition in France for Two Lent Motets
- Third Prize (2), Pro Arte competition in Wroclaw for Church Songs
- Order of the Knight - Polonia Restituta Cross
- Saint Albert Prize
- Fryderyk Award 2007

== Major commissions ==
- Erzbistum Köln, Germany (2012)
- Polyphony, Great Britain (2012)
- Filharmonia Wroclawska (2011)
- The King's Singers, Great Britain (2010)
- Adam Mickiewicz Institute (2010)
- Kultur-Insel Bremgarten, Switzerland (2009)
- CoMA, London, Great Britain (2008)
- Britten Sinfonia, Cambridge, Great Britain (2007)
- Polish Composers' Union (2006)
- Kobe Chuo Chorus, Japan (2005)
- Akademie Klausenhof, Germany (2004)
- Pontificia Universidad Católica de Valparaíso, Chile (2003)
- Musica Viva Association, Montreal, Canada (2003)
- Polish Radio (1997)
- Theatre Des Cinq Diamants, Paris, France (1992)

== Major performances ==
His works have been performed in the following countries:

=== Europe ===
- Belarus
- Belgium
- Czech Republic
- Denmark
- France
- Germany
- Iceland
- Italy
- Lithuania
- Luxembourg
- Malta
- Moldova
- Monaco
- Poland
- Romania
- Switzerland
- Ukraine
- United Kingdom
- Vatican

=== North America ===
- Canada
- United States

=== Caribbean ===
- Cuba

=== South America ===
- Argentine
- Chile
- Peru
- Uruguay

=== Asia ===
- China
- South Korea
- Japan

=== Middle East ===
- Israel

His pieces have been performed at numerous domestic festivals such as the International Sacred Music Festival "Gaude Mater" in Częstochowa, the Young Composers Forum in Cracow, the "Laboratory of Contemporary Music" in Białystok, Music in Old Cracow, Wratislavia Cantans and in France, Germany ("Unerhörte Musik" Festival in Berlin), Italy (also in Vatican), Belgium, Monaco and Canada (5th Edmonton New Music Festival).

== Recordings ==
- Lukaszewski: Geistliche Chorwerke (Hyperion) - Choir of Trinity College Cambridge conducted by Stephen Layton (2008)
- Lukaszewski: Motets (Warner Classics) - Polish Chamber Choir (2017)
- Lukaszewski: Luctus Mariae (Acte Prealable) - Dorota Calek [Sopran], Marietta Kruzel-Sosnowska [Orgel] (2017)
- Lukaszewski: Geistliche Chorwerke "Daylight Declines" (Signum) - Tenebrae conducted by Nigel Short (2018)
- Lukaszewski: Symphonien Nr.3 & 6 (DUX) - Anna Mikolajczyk-Niewiedzial, Podlaskie Opera and Philharmonic Choir, Podlaskie Opera and Philharmonic Orchestra, Miroslaw Jacek Blaszczyk (2022)
- Łukaszewski: Sacred Choral Works (Ondine ODE1406-2) - State Choir Latvija conducted by Māris Sirmais (2022)

== Sources ==
David Wordsworth. 2013. Choir and Organ Journal, pp. 47–51.
