= Mališauskas =

- Lithuanian surname
- m.: Mališauskas
- f.: (unmarried): Mališauskaitė
- f.: (married): Mališauskienė
- Origin: Maliszewski

Mališauskas is a Lithuanian-language variant of the Polish surname Maliszewski. It may be transliterated into English as Malishauskas.

Notable people with this surname include:

- Vidmantas Mališauskas (born 1963), Lithuanian chess Grandmaster
- Henrikas Mališauskas, a Lithuanian Righteous Among the Nations
- Marija Mališauskienė, a Lithuanian Righteous Among the Nations
