= Yushkevich =

Yushkevich (Russian: Юшкевич), is a common Russian language surname of Polish, Belarusian and Jewish origin. It comes from "Yushka", a variation on the name Yuriy. It may refer to:

- Adolf Yushkevich, Russian historian of science
- Dmitri Yushkevich, Russian ice hockey player
- Pavel Yushkevich, Russian philosopher, father of Adolf Yushkevich
- Semyon Yushkevich, Russian writer
- Vasily Yushkevich, Soviet general

== See also ==
- Igor Youskevitch (1912–1994), a ballet dancer, teacher and choreographer.
- Nina Youshkevitch (1920–1998), a ballet dancer and teacher, restorer of ballets by Nijinska.
- Juszkiewicz
