= Łukasz Paulewicz =

Polish footballer

Personal information
- Full name: Łukasz Paulewicz
- Date of birth: 3 April 1983 (age 43)
- Place of birth: Gdańsk, Poland
- Height: 1.86 m (6 ft 1 in)
- Position: Midfielder

Youth career
- MOSiR Pruszcz Gdański

Senior career*
Years	Team	Apps	(Gls)
2001–2002	Lechia Gdańsk	19	(14)
2002	Świt Nowy Dwór Mazowiecki	0	(0)
2003	Hetman Zamość	8	(0)
2004	Siarka Tarnobrzeg		
2004	Drwęca Nowe Miasto Lubawskie		
2005	Lech Poznań	1	(0)
2005	Polonia Warsaw	3	(0)
2006	Cartusia Kartuzy		
2007–2009	Kotwica Kołobrzeg	3	(0)
2010–2013	Czarni Pruszcz Gdański		
2014	GTS Pszczółki		
- * Club domestic league appearances and goals

Łukasz Paulewicz (born 3 April 1983) is a Polish former professional footballer who played as a midfielder.

== Career ==
Paulewicz started playing football with the youth sides of MOSiR Pruszcz Gdański before joining Lechia Gdańsk, who had just left the Lechia-Polonia Gdańsk merger and were having to restart from the sixth tier. Paulewicz made his Lechia debut on 18 August 2001 against Delta Miłoradz, and made 19 appearances in the league going on to score 14 goals in the process, helping Lechia to win promotion to the V liga. He started his career as a forward before later transitioning into a midfield player for the majority of his career.

After his first season with Lechia, his career was notable for having a series of short spells with clubs, often only staying for six months with a club at a time. After his time with Lechia he joined II liga side Świt Nowy Dwór Mazowiecki, but failed to make an appearance during his six-month spell. His next move was with Hetman Zamość, also in the II liga, but at the lower end of the table, giving Paulewicz the chance to get playing time in the league for the club. Hetman were relegated at the end of the season, with Paulewicz remaining with the club for the first six months of the next campaign in the III liga. During the mid-season break he joined Siarka Tarnobrzeg, leaving at the end of the season moving to Drwęca Nowe Miasto Lubawskie. In 2005 Paulewicz was given the chance to play in Poland's top division, joining Lech Poznań. While the move to Lech was not a success, he made his I liga debut on 12 June 2005 in a 2–0 away win against Polonia Warsaw. It was Polonia Warsaw whom he joined next, adding a further 3 top flight appearances to his record, meaning he played in a total of 4 I liga appearances during his career.

He joined Cartusia Kartuzy for six months leaving at the end of the season. Paulewicz found himself without a club for the following season, and returned to playing football in 2007 with Kotwica Kołobrzeg. With Kotwica he won promotion in his first season, making a further 3 II liga appearances the following season. After his spell with Kotwica Paulewicz joined Czarni Pruszcz Gdański in what would be the longest spell of his career with one club, spending four and a half seasons with Czarni. In 2014 he joined GTS Pszczółki, retiring from football at the end of the season.
