= Martin Foltýn =

Czech footballer

Personal information
- Date of birth: 17 August 1993 (age 33)
- Place of birth: Czech Republic
- Height: 1.83 m (6 ft 0 in)
- Position: Midfielder

Team information
- Current team: Silon Táborsko
- Number: 28

Youth career
- Baník Ostrava

Senior career*
Years	Team	Apps	(Gls)
2012–2016	Baník Ostrava	31	(0)
2014	→ Hlučín (loan)		
2015–2016	→ Hlučín (loan)		
2017–2019	Hlučín	85	(15)
2019–2020	Baník Ostrava	0	(0)
2019–2020	Baník Ostrava B	16	(3)
2020–2023	Třinec	75	(6)
2023–	Silon Táborsko	14	(0)
- * Club domestic league appearances and goals as of 25 January 2024

Martin Foltýn (born 17 August 1993) is a Czech football player who plays for Silon Táborsko.
