= Łukasz Cichos =

Polish footballer (born 1982)

Personal information
- Full name: Łukasz Cichos
- Date of birth: 2 June 1982 (age 44)
- Place of birth: Konin, Poland
- Height: 1.87 m (6 ft 1 1/2 in)
- Position: Striker

Senior career*
| Years | Team | Apps | (Gls) |
| 1999–2001 | Aluminium Konin | | |
| 2001 | SKP Słupca | | |
| 2002 | Zryw Dąbie | | |
| 2002–2003 | Sokół Kleczew | | |
| 2003 | Aluminium Konin | 13 | (1) |
| 2004 | Sokół Kleczew | | |
| 2005 | Jarota Jarocin | | |
| 2006 | Tur Turek | | |
| 2007 | KSZO Ostrowiec | 10 | (1) |
| 2007–2008 | Tur Turek | 41 | (15) |
| 2009–2011 | Korona Kielce | 21 | (2) |
| 2010 | → Znicz Pruszków (loan) | 7 | (0) |
| 2010–2011 | → Termalica Bruk-Bet (loan) | 29 | (11) |
| 2012–2013 | Siarka Tarnobrzeg | 26 | (3) |
| 2013 | Radomiak Radom | 17 | (3) |
| 2014–2018 | Sokół Kleczew | 143 | (58) |

Managerial career
- 2018–2020: Sokół Kleczew
- 2022–2024: Sokół Kleczew
- * Club domestic league appearances and goals

Łukasz Cichos (born 2 June 1982) is a Polish professional football manager and former player who was most recently in charge of Sokół Kleczew.

== Managerial statistics ==
As of match played 27 April 2024

Managerial record by team and tenure
| Team | From | To | Record | | | | | | | |
| Team | From | To | G | W | D | L | GF | GA | GD | Win % |
|---|---|---|---|---|---|---|---|---|---|---|
| Sokół Kleczew | 5 June 2018 | 30 November 2020 | 79 | 39 | 14 | 26 | 139 | 88 | +51 | 49.37 |
| Sokół Kleczew | 29 August 2022 | 30 April 2024 | 63 | 26 | 10 | 27 | 106 | 99 | +7 | 41.27 |
| Total | | | 142 | 65 | 24 | 53 | 245 | 187 | +58 | 45.77 |

== Honours ==
=== Player ===
Jarota Jarocin

- Polish Cup (Konin regionals): 2004–05

Sokół Kleczew

- III liga Kuyavia–Pomerania – Greater Poland: 2013–14
- Polish Cup (Greater Poland regionals): 2013–14
- Polish Cup (Konin regionals): 2013–14, 2017–18

=== Managerial ===
Sokół Kleczew

- Polish Cup (Greater Poland regionals): 2022–23
- Polish Cup (Konin regionals): 2018–19
