= Bronisława Łukaszewicz =

Polish-Lithuanian painter

- Born: 1885; Kresy
- Died: 1962 (aged 76–77)
- Education: The Academy of Fine Arts in Krakow and Accademia di Belle Arti di Roma

Bronisława Łukaszewicz (1885-1962) was a Polish-Lithuanian painter.

== Biography ==
Bronisława Łukaszewicz was born in the Kresy area and studied at St. Petersburg Gymnasium from where she graduated in 1901.

She then lived in Vilnius, Lithuania. After Vilnius University was closed in 1832, art students had to travel to St. Petersburg, Krakow, Warsaw or Paris in order to pursue their studies. Bronisława chose to study at the Academy of Fine Arts in Krakow and then the Academy of Fine Arts in Rome (Accademia di Belle Arti di Roma), obtaining her diploma in 1932.

In the 1930s Bronisława worked both in Vilnius and Rome. From 1932 she belonged to the Vilnius Society of Independent Artists (Polish: Wileńskiego Towarzystwa Niezależnych Artystów Sztuk Plastycznych). She exhibited with the Society in 1933 at the Zachęta National Gallery of Art in Warsaw, and in 1935 she was registered as a member of the Society in their annual exhibition catalogue.

During WWII, Bronisława lived in Rome.

After WWII Bronisława lived in Poznan and Szczecin, Poland and from 1946 she was a member of the ZPAP (Association of Polish Artists and Designers). She joined the group of Szczecin artists in 1947 or 1948.

Bronisława died in 1962.

== Exhibitions ==
Bronisława Łukaszewicz exhibited with the Vilnius Society of Independent Artists in Vilnius, Kaunas and at the Zachęta National Gallery of Art in Warsaw. Later she exhibited in Poznan and between 1955-62, in many expositions in the Szczecin area.

A book was written about Bronisława’s painting during her time in Szczecin.

== Style ==
Bronisława Łukaszewicz is known in her later years for her lyrical landscape paintings, and her use of a light and delicate palette. Watercolours were her preferred medium, but she also worked with gouache and oils.

== Surviving Works ==
Bronisława Łukaszewicz's work can be seen in the National Museum, Szczecin collection. A portrait of Bronisława, painted by an unknown artist, hangs in the Vilnius Picture Gallery. The Vilnius Picture Gallery also have a few of her pieces.
