= Łukasz Kominiak =

Polish footballer

Personal information
- Date of birth: 17 February 1990 (age 36)
- Place of birth: Kraków, Poland
- Height: 1.87 m (6 ft 2 in)
- Positions: Defender; midfielder

Youth career
- Olimpic Kraków

Senior career*
| Years | Team | Apps | (Gls) |
| 2006–2009 | Wisła Kraków | 0 | (0) |
| 2009 | Kmita Zabierzów | 15 | (2) |
| 2010 | Sandecja Nowy Sącz | 0 | (0) |
| 2010 | Kmita Zabierzów | 1 | (0) |
| 2011 | Kolejarz Stróże | 5 | (0) |
| 2012-2014 | Raków Częstochowa | 3 | (0) |
| 2014 | Legionovia Legionowo | 18 | (1) |
| 2015 | Pilica Białobrzegi | 16 | (0) |
| 2015 | Świt Nowy Dwór Mazowiecki | 16 | (0) |
| 2016 | Broń Radom | 2 | (0) |
| 2016–2018 | Kmita Zabierzów | | |
| 2018–2020 | Weszło Warsaw | 18 | (2) |
- * Club domestic league appearances and goals

Łukasz Kominiak (born 17 February 1990) is a Polish former professional footballer who played as a defender or midfielder.

== Honours ==
Weszło Warsaw

- Klasa B Warsaw III: 2018–19
