= Lukashevich =

Lukashevich or Lukashevych is an East Slavic surname (Russian: Лукашевич, Belarusian: Лукашэвіч, Ukrainian: Лукашевич). Similar Polish surnames are: Łukasiewicz, Łukaszewicz.

the surname may refer to:

- Olexiy Lukashevych, Ukrainian long jumper
- Ivan Lukashevich, Russian Formula Palmer Audi rider
- Nadezhda Lukashevich, Russian singer
- Nikolai Lukashevich (1941–2021), Russian military officer
