= Michael Foltýn =

Czech ice hockey player

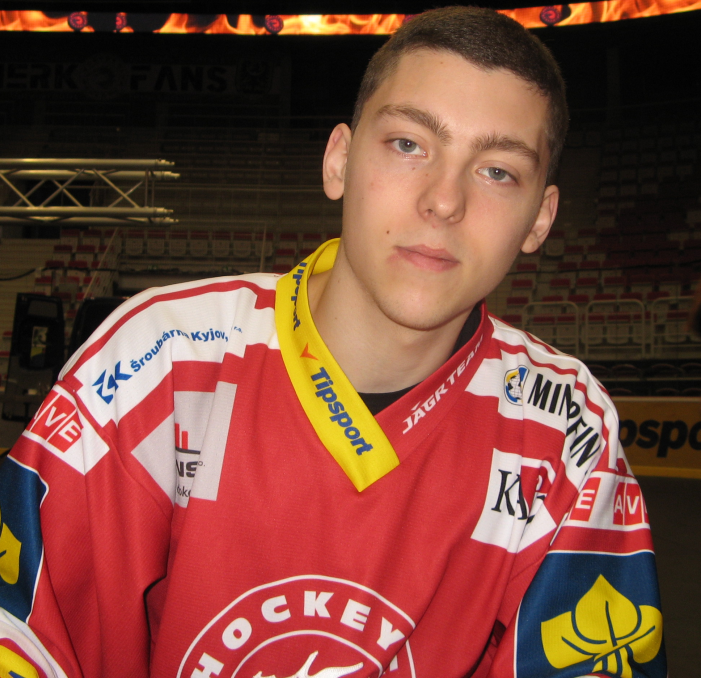
- Michael Foltýn
- Born: October 6, 1994 (age 30); Czech Republic
- Height: 6 ft 1 in (185 cm)
- Weight: 176 lb (80 kg; 12 st 8 lb)
- Position: Defense
- Shoots: Left
- Czech team: HC Oceláři Třinec
- Playing career: 2013–present

Michael Foltýn (born October 6, 1994) is a Czech professional ice hockey player. He is currently playing for HC Oceláři Třinec of the Czech Extraliga.

Foltýn made his Czech Extraliga debut playing with HC Oceláři Třinec during the 2013-14 Czech Extraliga season.
