= Łukasz Foltyn =

Łukasz Foltyn (Polish pronunciation: [ˈwukaʂ ˈfɔltɨn]; born in 1974) is a Polish programmer, the creator of Gadu-Gadu instant messenger and Foltyn Commander program. The founder of sms-express.com portal (current name – Gadu-Gadu), the former leader of the Social Democratic Party (party was not established)

== Computer Science ==
He was co-creating an anti-virus program mks vir alongside Marek Sell for some time.

In 1999 he coded Gadu-Gadu instant messenger which first version was released on 15 August 2000. He was acting as the CEO and the till 16 May 2007 he was a member of the board of directors of Gadu-Gadu SA. In 2000 Warsaw Equity Holding bought 45% stake in the company for 700,000 zł. Beginning on 26 March 2007 Gadu-Gadu SA is listed on the Warsaw Stock Exchange.

From 16 May 2007, as a result of resignation from membership in the supervisory board, Foltyn does not act in the company, staying a notable shareholder.

== Politics ==
Foltyn declares himself as a social democracy ideas supporter. He used to publish in leftist Trybuna Robotnicza magazine. He is a co-founder and the leader of Social Democratic Party. Earlier he used to participate in the program board of Polish Labour Party and among leaders of Warsaw department of Polish Socialist Party.

On 14 June 2007 Foltyn took the lead of the new Social Democratic Party. The party's registration was not completed.

In Polish parliament election 2007 he was seeking a mandate starting from the Polish People's Party Warsaw list as the number one. He was not elected.

== Personal life ==
Foltyn attended the Franciszek Zubrzycki Primary School number 6 in Radom and Jan Kochanowski VI Secondary School in Radom. His father is an engineer, his mother an English teacher. He's got 6 sisters and a younger brother, Adam, a computer scientist too. Together with his wife Anna he's got 2 children – Bartosz and Natalia. He has lived in Warsaw for 10 years.

== Prizes ==
Foltyn is a laureate of INFO STAR and "Talent 1997" awarded by I Program of Polish Radio.
