= Lukashenko (surname) =

Lukashenko (Ukrainian: Лукашенко) is a Ukrainian surname which means "son of Lukash", the native form of the given name Luke. Notable people with this surname include:

- Alexander Lukashenko (born 1954), president of Belarus since 1994
- Dmitry Lukashenko (born 1980), second son of Alexander Lukashenko
- Galina Lukashenko (born 1955), wife of Alexander Lukashenko
- Nikolay Lukashenko (born 2004), third son of Alexander Lukashenko
- Viktor Lukashenko (born 1975), first son of Alexander Lukashenko
- Volodymyr Lukashenko (born 1980), Ukrainian sabre fencer
