= Łukasz Uszalewski =

Polish footballer

Personal information
- Full name: Łukasz Uszalewski
- Date of birth: 27 April 1988 (age 38)
- Place of birth: Gdańsk, Poland
- Height: 1.85 m (6 ft 1 in)
- Position: Centre-back

Youth career
- 2003–2004: Lechia Gdańsk
- 2004: Cracovia

Senior career*
Years	Team	Apps	(Gls)
2005–2006	Cracovia II		
2006–2010	Cracovia	6	(0)
2007–2010	Cracovia (ME)	62	(0)
2009–2010	→ GKS Katowice (loan)	21	(0)
2011–2012	Flota Świnoujście	3	(0)
2012	Bałtyk Koszalin	11	(0)
2013–2014	Concordia Elblag	34	(0)
2014–2016	MKS Kluczbork	49	(0)
2016–2017	Elana Toruń	32	(0)
2018	AP Sopot		
- * Club domestic league appearances and goals

Łukasz Uszalewski (born 27 April 1988) is a Polish former professional footballer who played as a centre-back. Following retirement, he became a real estate agent.

== Career ==
In February 2011, he moved to Flota Świnoujście.

== Honours ==
MKS Kluczbork

- II liga: 2014–15

Elana Toruń

- III liga, gr. II: 2017–18
