= Lukash Dzekut-Malei =

Belarusian Baptist pastor, national activist, and Bible translator

Lukash Mikalaevich Dzekut-Malei
- Лукаш Мікалаевіч Дзекуць-Малей (Belarusian)
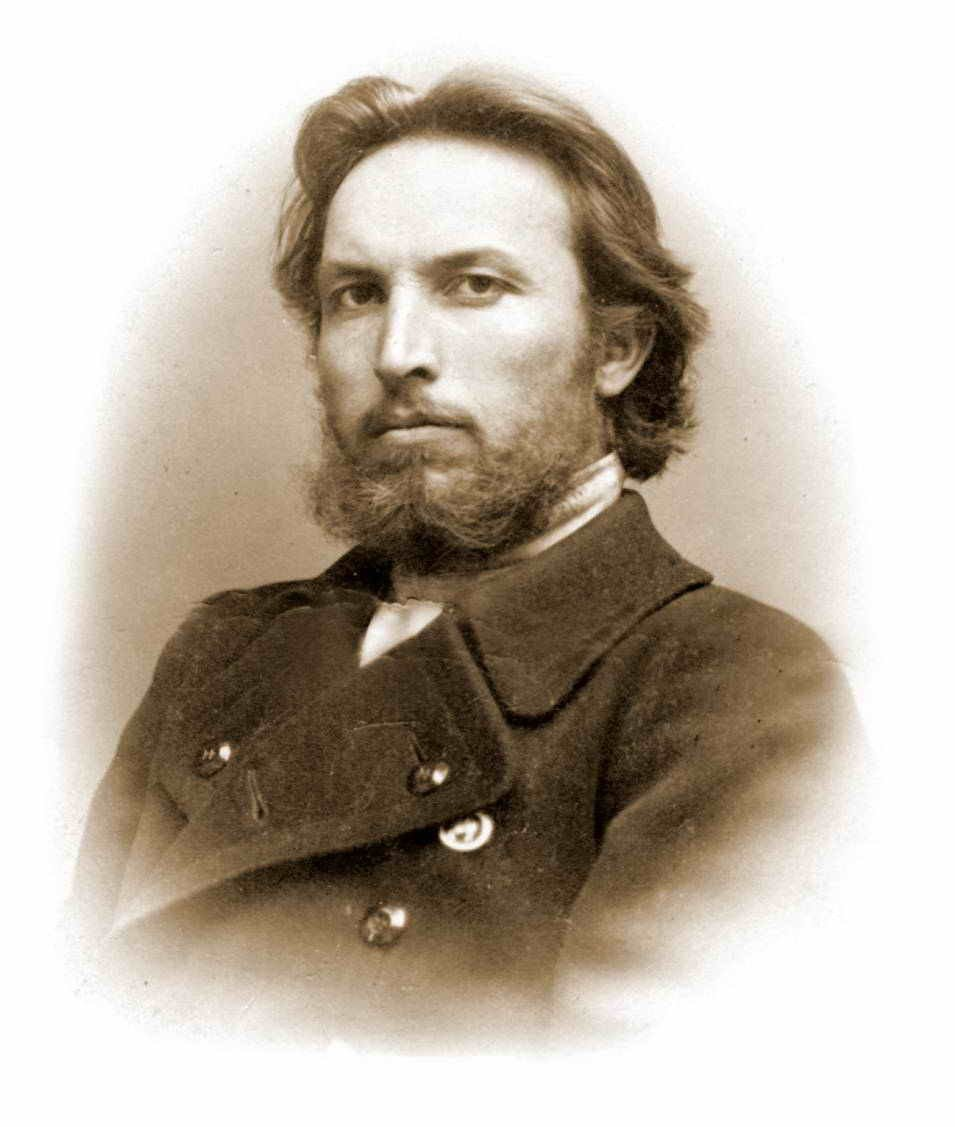
- Lukash Dzekut-Malei in 1920
- Born: October 1, 1888; Slonim
- Died: January 20, 1955 (aged 66); Gdańsk
- Resting place: Gdańsk Garrison Cemetery
- Occupations: Baptist pastor, national activist, Bible translator
- Spouse: Serafina Kiszków
- Children: 5

Lukash Mikalaevich Dzekut-Malei (Belarusian: Лукаш Мікалаевіч Дзекуць-Малей; 1 October 1888 – 20 January 1955) was a Belarusian Baptist pastor, national and independence activist, social figure, and translator of the Bible into the Belarusian language. He translated several religious pamphlets into Belarusian, published his own prayer book, and contributed to religious periodicals. During the interwar period, he established numerous Baptist congregations around Brest. He actively participated in the Belarusian national movement during both World War I and World War II, and was repeatedly suspected of espionage.

== Biography ==
Lukash Dzekut-Malei was born on 1 October 1888 in Slonim, then part of the Russian Empire, into an Orthodox family. His father was a teacher. Orphaned at the age of four under undisclosed circumstances, he was raised until age 16 by the Funt family, who were also teachers. After completing pedagogical school, he became a teacher himself.

In 1912, while serving in the military in Białystok, he encountered Baptism. On 31 December 1912, he was baptized in the Supraśl river by preacher Roman Chomiak. Due to his frequent preaching, he was arrested by Tsarist authorities in the village of Lyskava (near Pruzhany). Tied to a horse, he was forced to walk approximately 170 km to a prison in Brest. Between 1913 and 1914, he studied theology at a Bible school in Saint Petersburg, led by Ivan Prokhanov, a leader of evangelical Christians. After completing his studies, he served as a preacher in the Grodno Governorate, Vilna Governorate, and Minsk Governorate. During World War I, he settled in Grodno, traveling extensively across Western Belarus for his preaching activities. His frequent travels led to multiple arrests and accusations of espionage.

In 1918, he founded a Belarusian school in Krynki. In February and April 1919, he was briefly detained by Polish authorities for his involvement in the Belarusian national movement. In 1920, he was a leader of the Belarusian National Committee in Ihumen and headed the Belarusian school council in Grodno. Between 1919 and 1920, Polish authorities closed Belarusian schools around Grodno and prohibited Belarusian activists from operating. In 1921, Dzekut-Malei and other Belarusian activists were ordered to leave Grodno. That year, he relocated to Brest. There, he established a folk cultural society called "Belarusian Hut" (Беларуская хатка) and founded a Baptist congregation.

=== Baptist pastor ===
In 1921, negotiations began to unite the Baptist Union with the Union of Evangelical Christians. Dzekut-Malei actively participated, becoming a committee member (as a councilor) in 1922 to set unification terms. In 1923, a unification conference took place in Brest. According to Krzysztof Bednarczyk, Brest was chosen as the conference venue because "Lukash Dzekut-Malei was from the very beginning the greatest enthusiast of unification". He was elected to the Unification Committee. Two subsequent conferences were also held in Brest. The unification dissolved in 1927, though cooperation between the two groups ceased in September 1925. In September 1926, at a conference in Łódź, he was elected vice-president of the Baptist group. In 1937, he became a member of the church's Supreme Council.

Until 1939, Brest remained his primary area of activity, during which he founded numerous congregations around the region. In 1923, his congregation had 151 members (excluding children and supporters); by 1938, he had established 20 congregations in the Brest region with a total of 1,152 members. On 21 June 1926, a baptism ceremony he led in Kamyenyets attracted around 2,000 people. Historians of Baptism in Poland agree that the growth of Baptism around Brest during the interwar period, often described as a "spiritual revival", was closely tied to Dzekut-Malei's efforts. His sermons captivated audiences, though critics attributed this to supposed "sorcery", and the number of attendees at his meetings was often exaggerated.

On 11 June 1922, he married Serafina Kiszków (born 1898), also a teacher. They had five children: Łyko (born 1924), Lonia (born 1925, died in childhood), Serafina (born 1928), Lila (born 1929), and Daniel (born 1930).

In the 1930s, he organized and ran an orphanage in Brest, the only one operated by Polish Baptists during the interwar period. He also provided aid to Jewish families, particularly before Passover.

=== World War II ===
On the night of 18–19 June 1941, he was arrested by the NKVD and placed in a cell for those sentenced to death, while his wife and children were deported to the Altai Krai. He was suspected of spying for Nazi Germany. The outbreak of war with Germany saved him from execution, as German forces entered Brest on 22 June, the day of his planned execution. Under German occupation, he assisted Jews, leading to his arrest by the Gestapo in 1943.

On 27 June 1944, he participated in the Second All-Belarusian Congress in Minsk. In his speech, he expressed joy at the opportunity to hold the congress openly, as previous activities had been underground, and voiced hope for Belarusian freedom. A few days later, he evacuated with the German army as the Red Army entered Minsk.

=== Later years ===
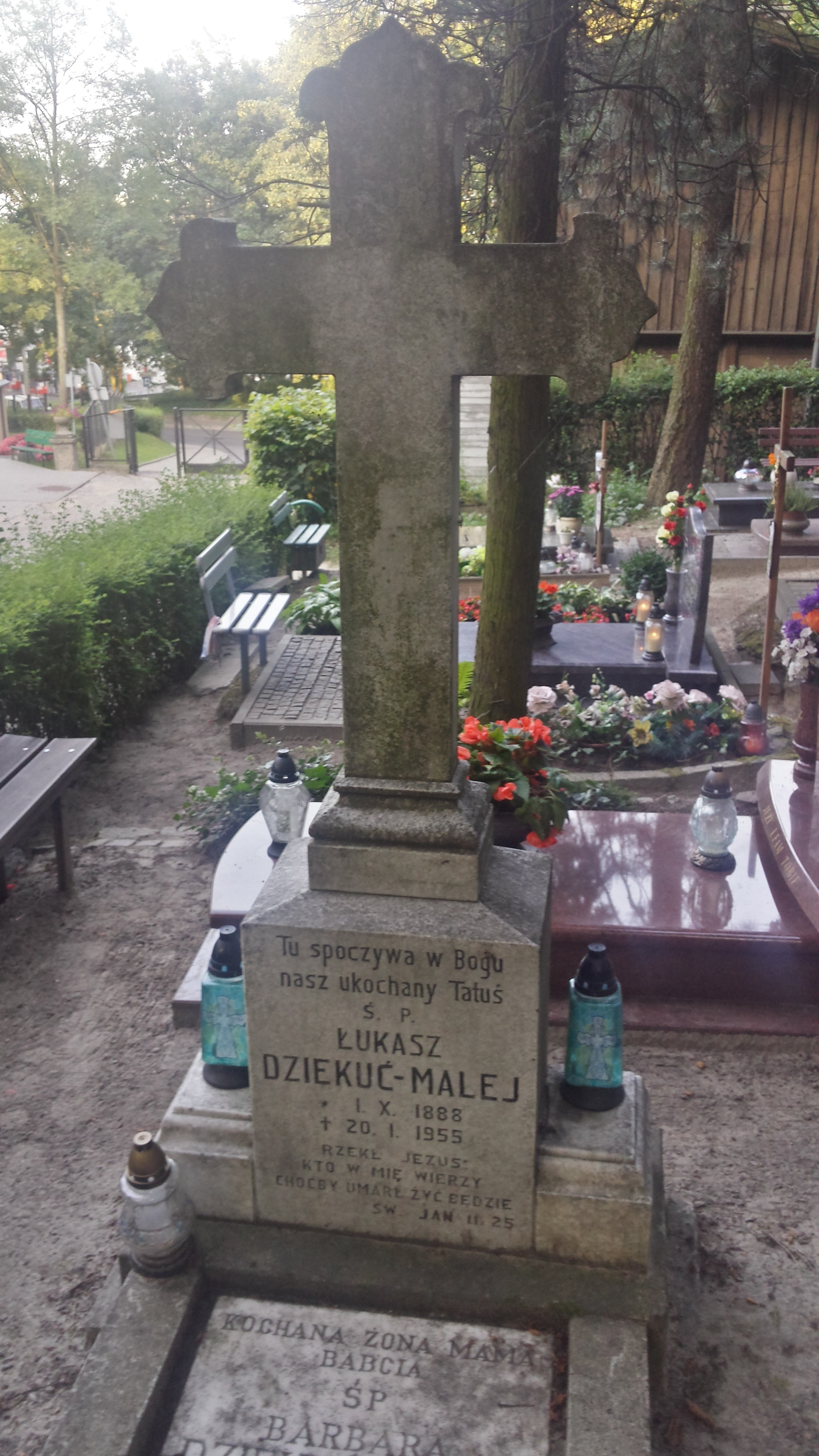
Grave of Łukasz Dzekut-Malei at the Garrison Cemetery in Gdańsk

In 1945, he was in Germany, including in Neubrandenburg. The circumstances of his departure from Germany are unclear. By 1946, he resided in Gdańsk. He chose not to return to Brest due to his roles as a pastor and Belarusian activist, which would have made him unwelcome in the Soviet Union. Staying in Poland posed less risk. He also declined to emigrate to the West, unlike many Belarusian activists, believing it would hinder his family's return from Siberia. His family rejoined him in 1946.

In Gdańsk, he became the pastor of the newly formed First Baptist Church in 1946. The congregation grew from 36 members in 1946 to 70 by 26 June 1947, and 87 by 30 April 1949. He initially served as a district presbyter but was removed from this role on 31 December 1949. From 1949 to 1952, he served as a preacher for the Baptist Church in Białystok.

He faced harassment from the Security Service, which accused him of collaborating with British intelligence. In Gdańsk, he avoided using the Belarusian language, even at home.

Łukasz Dzekut-Malei died on 20 January 1955 in Gdańsk due to diabetes. He was buried at the Gdańsk Garrison Cemetery (section 18, row D3, grave 1). His wife, Serafina, died on 18 February 1953, having suffered permanent health damage during her exile.

On 25 March 2004, the Gdańsk City Council named a street after him, at 15 Lukash Dzekut-Malei Street, in recognition of his contributions to Poles and Jews. Helena Głogowska, in her book Białorusini na Wybrzeżu Gdańskim, described him as one of three prominent Belarusian activists in Gdańsk Pomerania (alongside Mikołaj Dworzecki and Andrzej Wagina).

== Bible translator and publicist ==
In 1920, Dzekut-Malei initiated the translation of the Bible into Belarusian. He first translated the four Gospels, publishing them as separate booklets between 1926 and 1928 in Łódź. He was assisted in his translation work by Anton Luckievich (as editor), Rozenberg (for the Psalms), and his wife, Serafina. The New Testament and Psalms were published in 1931 by the British and Foreign Bible Society in Helsinki under the title Новы Запавет Госпада нашага Ісуса Хрыста і Псальмы in a print run of 25,000 copies. This was the first complete New Testament in Belarusian, earning him the title "father of the Belarusian Bible". The New Testament was reprinted three more times (1948, 1985, and 1991), totaling 50,000 copies. It is considered one of the best Belarusian translations, used by Protestants, Catholics, and Orthodox alike.

Dzekut-Malei regarded the translation as his greatest life achievement. In January 1945, he wrote from Neubrandenburg to Methodist pastor Jan Piotrowski in Berlin:

For a long time, I carried in my heart the desire for our people to have, like other nations, a complete Bible.

Between 1920 and 1924, he translated 17 religious pamphlets into Belarusian. From 1927 to 1928, he contributed a Belarusian column to the Baptist religious magazine Majak. In 1942, he published a Belarusian prayer book in Minsk.

== Bibliography ==
- Bednarczyk, Krzysztof (1997). Historia Zborów Baptystów w Polsce do 1939 roku [History of Baptist Congregations in Poland Until 1939] (in Polish). Warsaw: Słowo Prawdy. ISBN 83-86586-02-8.
- Głogowska, Helena (2003). Białorusini na Wybrzeżu Gdańskim [Belarusians on the Gdańsk Coast] (in Polish). Toruń: Wydawnictwo Adama Marszałka. ISBN 83-7322-370-3.
- Tomaszewski, Henryk Ryszard (2006). Wspólnoty chrześcijańskie typu ewangeliczno-baptystycznego na terenie Polski w latach 1858-1939 [Evangelical-Baptist Christian Communities in Poland in 1858–1939] (in Polish). Warsaw: WBST. ISBN 83-88497-11-1.
