= Malta Festival Poznań =

- Location: Poznań, Poland
- Founded: 1991
- Founded by: Malta Foundation
- Artistic director: Michał Merczyński
- Festival date: June
- Website: malta-festival.pl/en/

Malta Festival Poznań (until 2009: Malta International Theatre Festival) – international theatre festival held annually in June or at the turn of June and July in Poznań, Poland, since 1991.

The name Malta derives from Lake Malta located in the center of Poznań. It is one of the most important artistic events in Central and Eastern Europe and highly expected by the inhabitants.

It focuses on the outdoor and experimental theatre. Gradually the festival has expended its interests and became an overview of not only international theatrical acts but also music, dancing and even film. Most of the performances is shown directly on the streets all over the city.
