= Łukasz Turzyniecki =

Polish footballer

Personal information
- Date of birth: 25 March 1994 (age 32)
- Place of birth: Krasnystaw, Poland
- Height: 1.74 m (5 ft 9 in)
- Position: Defender

Team information
- Current team: Legia Warsaw U19 (match analyst)

Youth career
- –2010: Jedynka Krasnystaw
- 2010–2013: Legia Warsaw

Senior career*
Years	Team	Apps	(Gls)
2013–2015	Legia Warsaw II	52	(0)
2014–2015	Legia Warsaw	0	(0)
2015–2017	Wisła Puławy	37	(0)
2017–2019	Legia Warsaw	0	(0)
2017–2019	Legia Warsaw II	19	(0)
2019–2020	Widzew Łódź	21	(0)
2020–2022	Zagłębie Sosnowiec	26	(0)
2022–2023	Olimpia Elbląg	9	(0)
2023–2024	Legia Warsaw II	1	(0)
Total		165	(0)
- * Club domestic league appearances and goals

Łukasz Turzyniecki (born 25 March 1994) is a Polish former professional footballer who played as a defender. He is currently the match analyst for Legia Warsaw's under-19 team.

== Club career ==
In his two stints with Legia Warsaw he never appeared for the main squad in an Ekstraklasa game, but made appearances in the Polish Cup.

On 31 July 2020, he signed a two-year deal with Zagłębie Sosnowiec. On 23 May 2022, it was announced he would leave the team at the end of his contract.

On 1 July 2022, he moved to Olimpia Elbląg on a one-year deal with an extension option.

On 30 January 2023, he re-joined Legia Warsaw II.

== Honours ==
Legia Warsaw

- Polish Cup: 2017–18
