= Christophe Lukasiewicz =

French architect

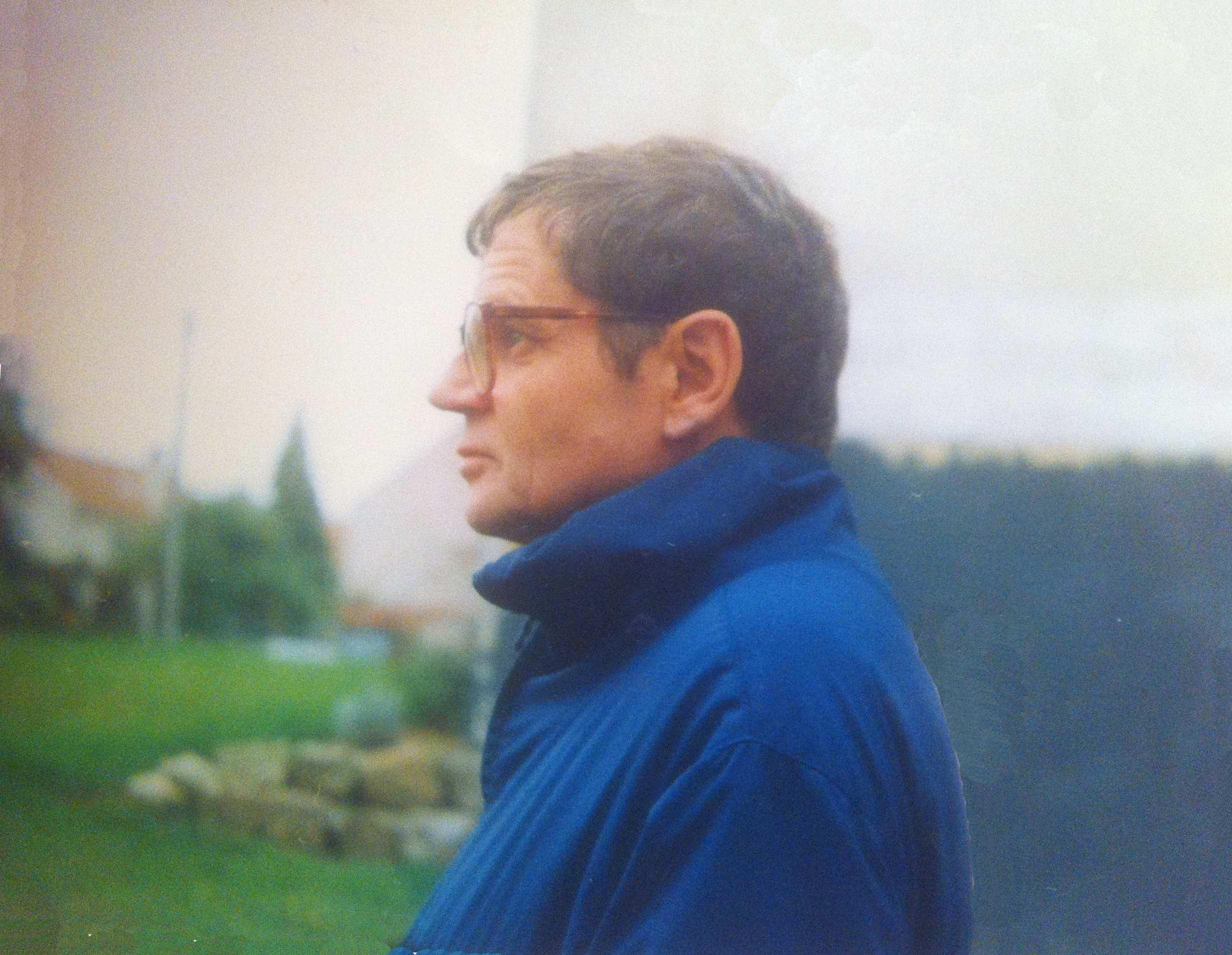
- Education: Ecole des Beaux Arts
- Occupation: Architect

Lukasiewicz Christophe was a French architect born in 1933 in Lublin and died in 1999 in Paris.

He won in 1972 the first prize of Plan Architecture Nouvelle No. 1 (P.A.N., now called Europan) and opened his practice in 1975 by realizing this competition project.

== Biography ==
Graduated in 1958 from the Warsaw Polytechnic University with an engineering degree in architecture, Christophe Lukasiewicz was about to complete a double degree at the Warsaw Academia Sztuk Pieknych (Ecole des Beaux Arts). Thus he met a friend, the painter Fangor, today recognized for his visual work, (Visual art and kinetic art). He also, during his studies, worked for the architect Georges Soltan (close to Team 10 designs). He offered him to work in Paris.

Assistant at the School of Fine Arts in Paris, he worked with Jozef i Ewa Brukalski as project manager in the office of the architect and professor Emile Aillaud.

Author of a large number of city plans, Christophe Lukasiewicz developed a new design of the Town Planning: parks and gardens surrounded by terraced buildings, shopping streets and markets. He developed the classic city plan (London crescent) or garden city plan seeking to build a city resulting from a millennium urbanisation (diversity of scenery, withdrawal alignment, arcades, terraces). Using industrial prefabrication process, he created an aesthetic in which useful constructions becomes decorative by his play (See Melun-Senart The arcades ILM). With this project, he initiated the creation of a cubist city.

He used during these projects all forms of architecture that connect with the environment and nature: patio, balcony, terraces, winder gardens and bay-windows around trees and green spaces.

Painter, like his father, Stanislas Lukasiewicz, architect of the mid-century in Warsaw, he had represented the environment to recreate it.

He is the author of the footbridge and lifts that allow access to the Jardin Atlantique above the Gare Montparnasse in Paris (see architecture mobile). He suggested applying its garden town planning to the Paris density. He produced a functional, human and cultural design for the city (according to English biography of Ch. Lukasiewicz), proposing the restoration of a mansion or new layout for the Avenue des Champs-Élysées, with his friend and architect Andre Schuch (architect of all new kiosk for newspapers in Paris) .

At the very end of his life and returning to Warsaw, he created in Wolomin, near Warsaw, a city generated by successive acquisitions with the same alternate architectures which give character to houses and creates urban unity. At the same time, Christophe Lukasiewicz wrote an architectural treaty (not published) completing his first book, Urbanisme des places et des rues (first book).

"In architecture forms result from the need of shelter, the search of economic and of human comfort" Christophe Lukasiewicz, architecture Treaty, circa 1994.

The grand part of Christophe Lukasiewicz archives are available at the Cité de l'Architecture et du Patrimoine of Paris department of the French Institute of Architecture (IFA).

== Publications ==
- Lukasiewicz (Ch.), "La ville", Techniques et architecture, n° 2, septembre 1966, pp. 141–146.
- Lukasiewicz (Ch.), Urbanisme des rues et des places. Maisons en terrasses, Joinville-le-Pont, décembre 1975.
- Noliac (J.), "Evry: les HLM à l'heure de l'innovation", Le Bâtiment-Bâtir, n° 1, janvier 1981, pp. 2–7.
- "Altenheim in Nanterre (résidence pour personnes âgées à Nanterre)", Baumeister, n° 3, mars 1982, pp. 281–282.
- Recherche théoriques sur l'habitat et la ville. Participation à l'exposition du G.E.A.M. (Groupe d'Etudes d'Architecture Mobile) à Paris en 1961.
- Publication d'une étude dans "World Architecture One" Studio Books London 1964 ED. John Donat.
- Article "La ville" revue " Technique et architecture" Nr. 27 série 2 - 1966
- Publication "Urbanisme des rues des places - Maisons Terrasses" édition au compte d'auteur 1975.
- Article "Espace urbain et sa rénovation" dans la revue "Urbanisme" - 1977.
- Article "Retrouver la forme complexe" dans "Technique et architecture" Nr. 312 décembre 1976.
- Article "Urbanisme des rues et des places" dans la revue polonaise "Architektura" septembre 1976.
- Publication de l'opération de 180 log. d'HLM dans la ville nouvelle de Melun Sénart dans "Femme d'Aujourd'hui octobre 1977.
- Publication de l'opération de 180 log. d'HLM dans la ville nouvelle de Melun Sénart dans "l'architecture d'aujourd'hui" avril 1978.
- Publication du projet primé PAN "Habitat individuel dans milieu urbain" dans "Technique et architecture" en 1978.
- Publication de la Résidence des Personnes Agées de Nanterre "Un jardin bien dissimulé" dans la revue "Crée" juin-juillet 1979.
- Article "Le point de vue de l'Architecte" - description de l'opération R.E.X. de 120 log. d'HLM à Chambéry dans la revue "Faire" Nr. 40 février 1979.
- Publication de la Résidence des Personnes Agées de Nanterre dans "Architecture d'Aujourd'hui" avril 1981.
- Publication in the polish review "Architektura" Nr.2 - 1981 - of all constructed projects.
- Publication de l'opération de 106 log. ILM à EVRY, quartier des Epinettes dans la revue "Le bâtiment - Bâtir" janvier 1981.
- Publication de la résidence des Personnes Agées de Nanterre dans la revue allemande " Baumeister" mars 1982.
- Mention de 7 réalisations dans le "Guide de l'Architecture en France de 1945-1983", édité par "l'Architecture d'Aujourd'hui"(Marc Emery et Patrice Goulet) 1983.
- Mention et commentaires du projet P.A.N. - 180 log. d'HLM dans la ville nouvelle de Melun-Sénart dans la revue "Urbanisme" - "15 ans de P.A.N. - Analyse urbaine", juin-juillet 1986.
- Mention et commentaires du projet R.E.X de 120 log. à Chambéry dans l'édition "Expérimentation - Formes Urbaines et Habitat Social - 120 réalisation expérimentales de Plan Construction 1978 - 1984.
- Catalogue de l'exposition du Pavillon de l'Arsenal sur le projet des Champs-Elysées (1992)
- Article de "Paris-Projet" N°30-31 "espaces publics" sur le projet des Champs-Elysées (juin 1993)
