= Milena Łukasiewicz =

Polish diplomat

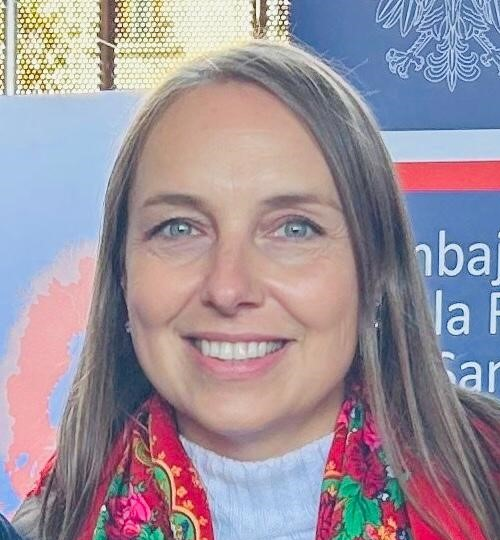
- Milena Łukasiewicz (2025)

Chargé d’affaires a.i. of the Republic of Poland to the Bolivarian Republic of Venezuela
- In office 1 January 2017 – 2023
- Preceded by: Piotr Kaszuba
- Succeeded by: Michał Faryś

Personal details
- Education: University of Warsaw

Milena Anna Łukasiewicz is a Polish diplomat, from 2017 to 2023 she served as chargé d'affaires to Venezuela.

== Life ==
Łukasiewicz graduated from Economics at the University of Warsaw (M.A., 2008). She has been also educated at the University of Strasbourg and Andrés Bello Catholic University (M.A., 2019).

In 2008, she was an intern at the European Commission. In 2011, during the Polish Presidency of the Council of the European Union, she joined the Permanent Representation of Poland to the European Union in Brussels. Next year, she has started her service at the Embassy of Poland in Caracas, Venezuela. On 1 January 2017, she took the post of chargé d’affaires to Venezuela, being additionally accredited to Barbados, Saint Kitts and Nevis, Grenada, Jamaica, Guyana, Suriname, Trinidad and Tobago, Saint Vincent and the Grenadines, Dominica. She is also the Consul. She ended her term in 2023. Next, she was Consul and deputy head of mission of the Embassy in Santiago, Chile.

Besides Polish, she speaks Spanish, English, French, and Portuguese.
