= Łukasz Bocian =

Polish footballer (born 1988)

Personal information
- Full name: Łukasz Bocian
- Date of birth: 29 May 1988 (age 38)
- Place of birth: Pabianice, Poland
- Height: 1.78 m (5 ft 10 in)
- Position: Midfielder

Team information
- Current team: Włókniarz Pabianice
- Number: 3

Youth career
- 2006: Włókniarz Pabianice

Senior career*
Years	Team	Apps	(Gls)
2007–2012	GKS Bełchatów (ME)	85	(4)
2010–2012	GKS Bełchatów	15	(1)
2012–2014	Kolejarz Stróże	57	(3)
2014–2016	GKS Tychy	20	(0)
2017–2019	Lechia Tomaszów Mazowiecki	61	(1)
2019–2023	RKS Radomsko	106	(8)
2023–2024	Orkan Buczek	45	(6)
2024–	Włókniarz Pabianice	56	(3)
- * Club domestic league appearances and goals as of 12:33, 30 June 2026 (UTC)

Łukasz Bocian (born 29 May 1988) is a Polish footballer who plays as a midfielder for IV liga Łódź club Włókniarz Pabianice.

== Honours ==
RKS Radomsko

- IV liga Łódź: 2018–19
