= Wojciech Łukaszewski =

Polish composer, pedagogue, music writer and impresario (1936–1978)

Wojciech Łukaszewski, born 10 March 1936 in Częstochowa – 13 April 1978 in Częstochowa, was a Polish composer, pedagogue, music writer and musical impresario. His father, Antoni Łukaszewski, worked in a legal firm and was a participant in the Third Silesian Uprising. His mother's name was Helena, née Michalska. In 1963, he married Maria Patrzyk, and they had two sons, the composer Paweł Łukaszewski and the musician and author Marcin Łukaszewski.

== Literature ==
- Marcin Lukaszewski (1997), Wojciech Lukaszewski – życie i twórczość, WSP Publishing, Częstochowa. ISBN 83-7098-254-9
