= Łukasz Tupalski =

Polish footballer

Personal information
- Full name: Łukasz Tupalski
- Date of birth: 4 September 1980 (age 46)
- Place of birth: Białystok, Poland
- Height: 1.87 m (6 ft 1 1/2 in)
- Position: Defender

Youth career
- 1993–1995: Włókniarz Białystok
- 1995–1997: Jagiellonia Białystok

Senior career*
| Years | Team | Apps | (Gls) |
| 1997–1999 | KP Wasilków | 31 | (2) |
| 1999–2005 | Jagiellonia Białystok | 112 | (5) |
| 2002 | → Wigry Suwałki (loan) | 17 | (2) |
| 2004 | → Górnik Łęczna (loan) | 4 | (0) |
| 2005–2006 | Zawisza Bydgoszcz (2) | 28 | (0) |
| 2006–2008 | Dyskobolia Grodzisk | 28 | (0) |
| 2008–2010 | Cracovia | 52 | (2) |
| 2010–2011 | Termalica Bruk-Bet | 12 | (0) |
- * Club domestic league appearances and goals

Łukasz Tupalski (born 4 September 1980) is a Polish former professional footballer who played as a defender.

== Honours ==
Dyskobolia Grodzisk Wielkopolski

- Polish Cup: 2006–07
- Ekstraklasa Cup: 2006–07
