= Lukasz Kurgan =

Polish-Canadian academic (born 1975)

- Born: Lukasz Andrzej Kurgan; 4 October 1975 (age 50); Kraków, Poland
- Education: University of Colorado at Boulder
- Scientific career
- Fields: Bioinformatics, Machine Learning
- Workplaces: Virginia Commonwealth University (2015–); University of Alberta (2003–2015); University of Colorado at Denver (2002–2003)
- Thesis: Meta Mining System for Supervised Learning (2003)
- Website: http://biomine.cs.vcu.edu/

Lukasz Kurgan (born 4 October 1975) is a Polish-Canadian bioinformatician. He is the Robert J. Mattauch Endowed Professor of Computer Science at the Virginia Commonwealth University, in Richmond, Virginia, U.S.A. He was a professor at the University of Alberta between 2003 and 2015. Kurgan earned his Ph.D. in computer science from the University of Colorado at Boulder in 2003 and his M.Sc. degree in automation and robotics from the AGH University of Science and Technology in 1999.

Kurgan is a Fellow of the American Institute for Medical and Biological Engineering (AIMBE), Fellow of the Kosciuszko Foundation Collegium of Eminent Scientists, Senior Member of the International Society for Computational Biology (ISCB), and Senior Member of Association for Computing Machinery (ACM). He serves as the Associate Editor-in-Chief of the Biomolecules journal. He also serves as a member of the Editorial Board of the Bioinformatics (journal).

His research focuses on the applications of machine learning in bioinformatics and structural bioinformatics of proteins, with focus on intrinsically disordered proteins, structural genomics, and protein function prediction. His research was funded by National Science Foundation (NSF), Natural Sciences and Engineering Research Council (NSERC), and Canadian Institutes of Health Research (CIHR). Kurgan published over 150 articles on topic related to bioinformatics and machine learning, which have been cited over 12,000 times according to Google Scholar. His research lab has developed popular methods for protein function prediction and protein structure prediction including MoRFpred, MFDp, DEPICTER, DRNApred, fDETECT, and DisoRDPbind. His lab also released the PDID protein-drug interaction database and the DescribePROT protein function database. Some of these tools won accolades in international competitions/assessments including the 3 place in disorder prediction at the 2012 Critical Assessment of Techniques for Protein Structure Prediction (CASP) and the top finish at the 2018 Critical Assessment of Intrinsic protein Disorder (CAID1).
