= Łukasz Jasiński =

Polish footballer

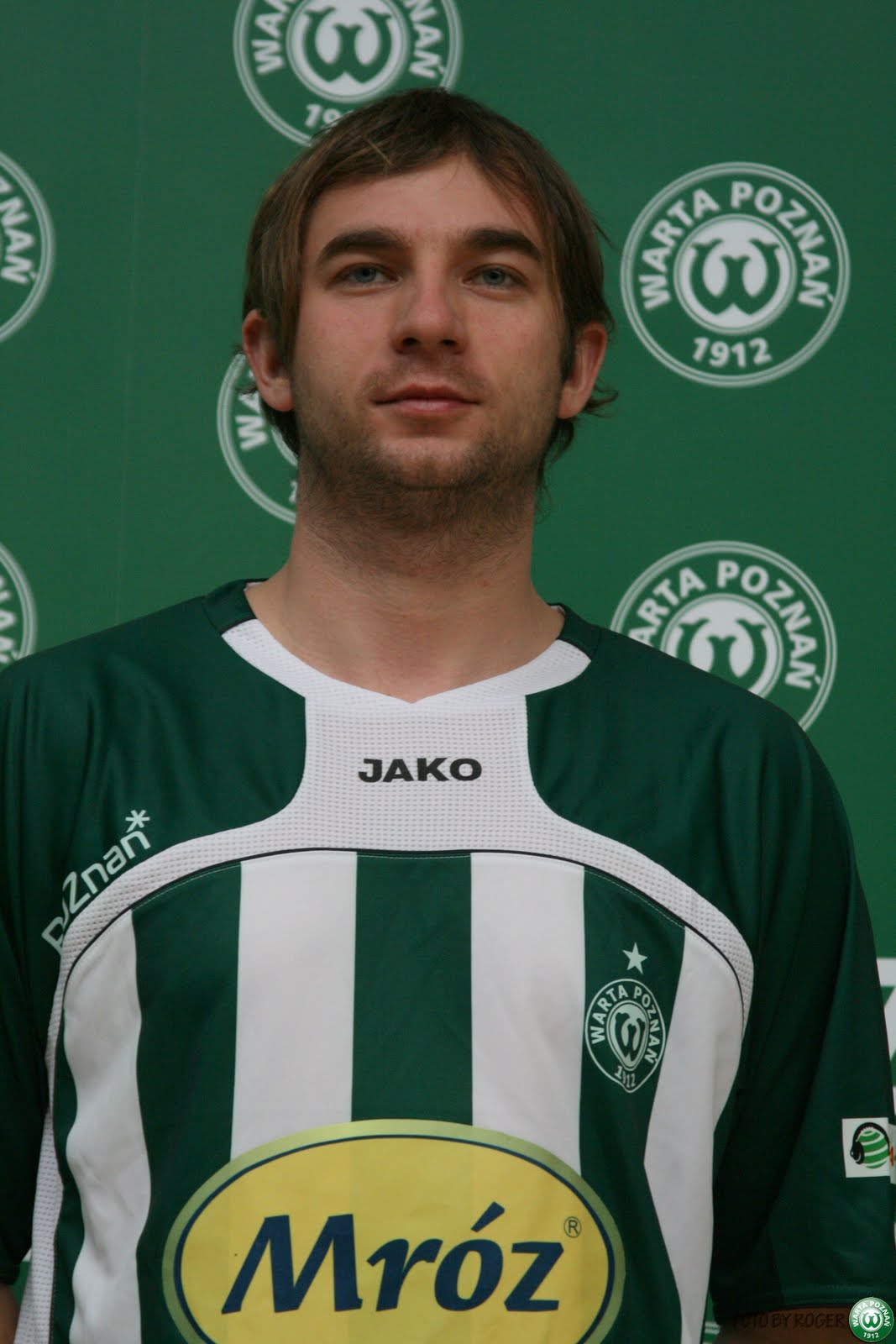

Personal information
- Date of birth: 13 October 1985 (age 41)
- Place of birth: Września, Poland
- Height: 1.90 m (6 ft 3 in)
- Position: Defender

Youth career
- Victoria Września

Senior career*
Years	Team	Apps	(Gls)
2003–2004	Aluminium Konin		
2005	Obra Kościan		
2006–2008	Wisła Płock	7	(0)
2006–2007	→ ŁKS Łomża (loan)	19	(0)
2007	→ Kujawiak Włocławek (loan)	10	(0)
2008	Tur Turek	14	(0)
2008–2011	Zagłębie Lubin	30	(0)
2010–2011	→ Warta Poznań (loan)	28	(2)
2011–2012	Warta Poznań	23	(2)
2013	Nielba Wągrowiec	13	(2)
2013–2014	Warta Poznań	26	(2)

International career
2004	Poland U19		
- * Club domestic league appearances and goals

Łukasz Jasiński (born 13 October 1985) is a Polish former professional footballer who played as a defender.

== Career ==
=== Club ===
He is trainee of Victoria Września. In the summer 2010, he was loaned to Warta Poznań from Zagłębie Lubin.
