= Łukasz Krzycki =

Polish footballer

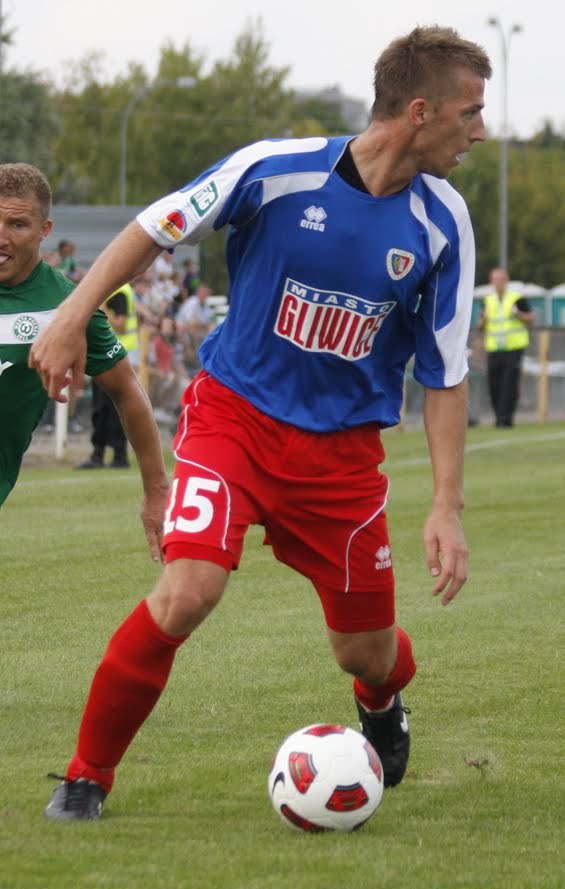

Personal information
- Full name: Łukasz Krzycki
- Date of birth: 10 January 1984 (age 42)
- Place of birth: Tychy, Poland
- Height: 1.84 m (6 ft 1/2 in)
- Position: Defender

Team information
- Current team: Piast Gliwice
- Number: 15

Youth career
- 2001–2002: MOSM Tychy

Senior career*
Years	Team	Apps	(Gls)
2002	Piast II Gliwice		
2002–2004	GKS Tychy '71		
2005–	Piast Gliwice	81	(5)
- * Club domestic league appearances and goals as of 7 July 2011

Łukasz Krzycki (born 10 January 1984 in Tychy) is a Polish footballer who plays for Piast Gliwice.

== Career ==
=== Club ===
He will still play for Piast Gliwice in season 2011/2012.
