= Witold Łukaszewski =

Polish musician (born 1956)

Witek Łukaszewski
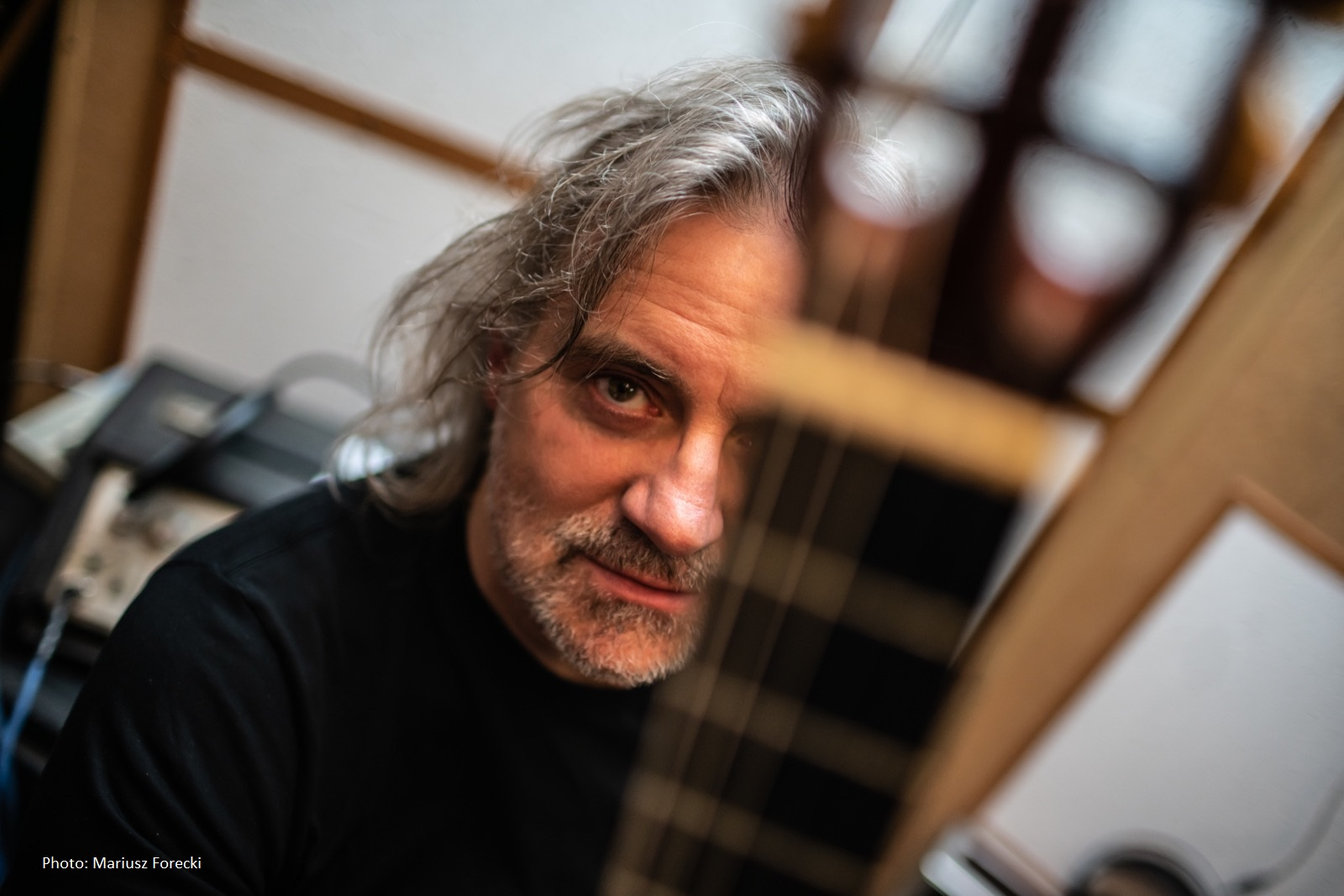

Background information
- Born: 30 November 1956 (age 69); Szczecin, Poland
- Genres: rock, blues, flamenco, jazz
- Occupations: guitarist, vocalist, songwriter, poet, writer
- Instruments: electric guitar, acoustic guitar, bass fretless, flute, gongs
- Members: Red Pink Acid Flamenco; Grand Piano Morrison Tres
- Website: https://witek-lukaszewski.pl/

Witek Łukaszewski, real name Witold Adam Łukaszewski, born 30 November 1956 in Szczecin, Poland – Polish bassist, classical and electric guitarist, vocalist, songwriter, poet and writer.

He is the founder and leader of several musical groups, including: Acid Flamenco founded in 1994, considered to be the first Polish band performing flamenco & rock music, Red Pink - performing a mixture of rock and blues, GrandPiano - a formation combining rock, flamenco, classical music and poetry and Morrison Tres - a trio playing progressive rock and jazz with elements of ethnic music.

Three times, in the years 1995-1997, he was chosen the best flamenco guitarist in Poland, according to the ranking of the prestigious music magazine "Guitar and Bass". In the years 1984-2001 he organized the legendary International Guitar Festival in Kościan. He is considered the precursor of the flamenco & rock genre in Poland.

In 2007 he debuted as a writer, publishing a music fiction book about Led Zeppelin. Two years later, he published his first volume of poetry with CD - "Cafe Poema". His other music fiction novels are "Dialogues: Jimi Hendrix & Niccolo Paganini" (2013) and "Dialogues (2): Jim Morrison & Pablo Picasso" (2016).

He performed three times at a Polish rock music festival Przystanek Woodstock with programs: “Magic of Flamenco” (2007), “Our Daily Norwid” (2008) and “Chopin’s Grand Piano” (2010). With “Chopin’s Grand Piano" project he also appeared at the Fryderyki award ceremony (2010) with famous Polish actor, Krzysztof Kolberger reciting Cyprian K. Norwid's poem.

He cooperated with number of musicians in Poland and Europe, e.g. Józef Skrzek and SBB, Apostolis Anthimos, Tomasz "Szakal" Szukalski, Jerzy Styczyński (Dżem), Andrzej Przybielski (Niemen), Wojciech Hoffmann (Turbo), Marek Raduli (Budka Suflera) and Christoph Titz. His poems were recited by Andrzej Seweryn and Olgierd Lukaszewicz – legendary figures of the Polish theatre. He is also the author of music and lyrics of the latest album of popular Polish pop singer Maryla Rodowicz "Oh, world .." (2018).

He has released 15 albums, including the most famous ones: DO (1997), Nie jest źle (2015) and 12 Godzin/12 Hours (2020) - a sophisticated rock concept album that is a modern history of entanglement in the manipulation of corporations and the media, lost love and the personal transformation of a "man after the ordeal" - a tribute to the Pink Floyd group.

== Books ==
- By Stairs to the Heaven. Led Zeppelin Story (2007)
- Cafe Poema (2009)
- Jimy Hendrix & Niccolo Paganini. Dialogues (2013)
- Jim Morrison & Pablo Picasso. Dialogues 2 (2016)

== Discography ==
=== With Acid Flamenco ===
- Acid Flamenco (1995)
- Magic of flamenco (2006)

=== With Red Pink ===
- Red Pink (1997)
- DO (1997)
- So much love (Tak wiele miłości) (2002)
- Live in Toscana (2006)

=== With Grand Piano ===
- It's not so bad (Nie jest źle) (2015)
- 13 song for the guitar and woman (13 utworów na gitarę i kobietę) (2004, re-release in 2016)
- Live in Linie (2017)

=== Solo ===
- 13 song for the guitar and woman (13 utworów na gitarę i kobietę) (2004)
- Undertow (2005)
- Cafe Poema (2009)
- Our Daily Norwid (Norwid Nasz Codzienny) (2010)
- So easy (Spokojnie tak) (2018)
- Album with Music and Lyrics (Płyta z Muzyką i Tekstem) (2020)
- 12 Hours (12 Godzin) (2020)
