= Łukasz Gierak =

Polish handball player (born 1988)

Personal information
- Nationality: Polish
- Born: 22 June 1988 (age 38) Wągrowiec, Poland
- Height: 1.92 m (6 ft 4 in)

Sport
- Sport: Handball
- Position: Centre back
- Current club: TuS Nettelstedt-Lübbecke
- Number: 10

Senior clubs
- Years: Team
- 2005–2012: MKS Nielba Wągrowiec
- 2012–2016: Pogoń Szczecin
- 2016–: TuS Nettelstedt-Lübbecke
National team
Years	Team	Apps	(Gls)
2015–	Poland	33	(36)

Łukasz Gierak (born 22 June 1988) is a Polish handball player for TuS Nettelstedt-Lübbecke and the Polish national team.

He participated at the 2016 Summer Olympics in Rio de Janeiro, in the men's handball tournament and at the 2017 World Men's Handball Championship.
