= Łukasz Zbonikowski =

Polish politician

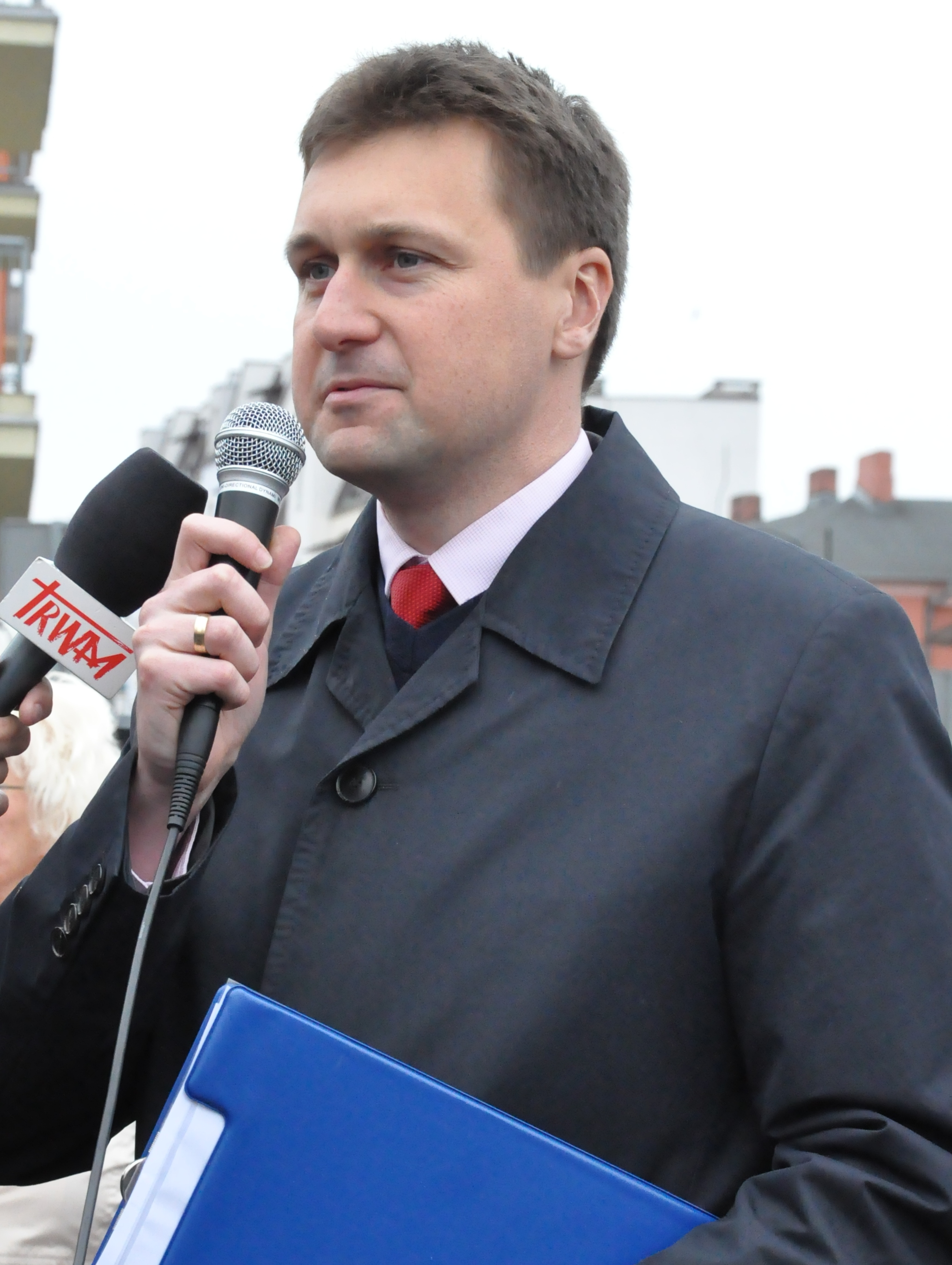
- Łukasz Zbonikowski

Member of the Sejm
- In office 2005–2019
- Constituency: 5 – Toruń

Personal details
- Born: February 20, 1978 (age 47); Toruń, Polish People's Republic
- Political party: Law and Justice

Łukasz Zbonikowski (born 20 February 1978 in Toruń) is a Polish politician. He was elected to the Sejm on 25 September 2005, getting 7209 votes in 5 Toruń district as a candidate from the Law and Justice list.

== See also ==
- Members of Polish Sejm 2005-2007
