= Łukasz Gajda =

Polish footballer (born 2003)

Personal information
- Full name: Łukasz Paweł Gajda
- Date of birth: 19 March 2003 (age 23)
- Place of birth: Rydułtowy, Poland
- Height: 1.78 m (5 ft 10 in)
- Position: Midfielder

Team information
- Current team: Unia Turza Śląska

Youth career
- Naprzód Czyżowice
- –2018: Odra Centrum Wodzisław

Senior career*
Years	Team	Apps	(Gls)
2019–2022	Odra Centrum Wodzisław	22	(1)
2019–2022	GKS Jastrzębie	21	(0)
2021	→ ROW Rybnik (loan)	15	(1)
2022–2023	Bruk-Bet Termalica	0	(0)
2023	→ Odra Wodzisław (loan)	15	(4)
2023–2025	Odra Wodzisław	45	(11)
2025	Sparta Katowice	11	(2)
2025–2026	TJ Tatran Oravské Veselé		
2026–	Unia Turza Śląska	0	(0)
- * Club domestic league appearances and goals as of 15:25, 13 June 2025 (UTC)

Łukasz Gajda (born 19 March 2003) is a Polish professional footballer who plays as a midfielder for IV liga Silesia club Unia Turza Śląska.

== Career statistics ==
As of match played 7 June 2025

Appearances and goals by club, season and competition
Club	Season	League			Polish Cup		Continental		Other		Total	
Club	Season	Division	Apps	Goals	Apps	Goals	Apps	Goals	Apps	Goals	Apps	Goals
Odra Centrum Wodzisław	2018–19	IV liga Silesia II	22	1	—		—		—		22	1
GKS Jastrzębie	2019–20	I liga	1	0	0	0	—		—		1	0
GKS Jastrzębie	2020–21	I liga	0	0	0	0	—		—		0	0
GKS Jastrzębie	2021–22	I liga	20	0	2	1	—		—		22	1
GKS Jastrzębie	Total		21	0	2	1	—		—		23	1
ROW Rybnik (loan)	2020–21	III liga, gr. III	15	1	—		—		—		15	1
Bruk-Bet Termalica	2022–23	I liga	0	0	0	0	—		—		0	0
Odra Wodzisław (loan)	2022–23	III liga, gr. III	15	4	—		—		—		15	4
Odra Wodzisław	2023–24	IV liga Silesia II	30	9	—		—		—		30	9
Odra Wodzisław	2024–25	IV liga Silesia	15	2	—		—		—		15	2
Odra Wodzisław	Total		60	15	—		—		—		60	15
Sparta Katowice	2024–25	IV liga Silesia	11	2	—		—		—		11	2
TJ Tatran Oravské Veselé	2025–26	3. Liga	?	?	—		—		—		?	?
Career total			129	19	2	1	0	0	0	0	131	20

== Honours ==
ROW Rybnik

- Polish Cup (Rybnik regionals): 2020–21

Sparta Katowice

- IV liga Silesia: 2024–25
