= Łukasz Jarmuła =

Polish chess grandmaster (born 1998)

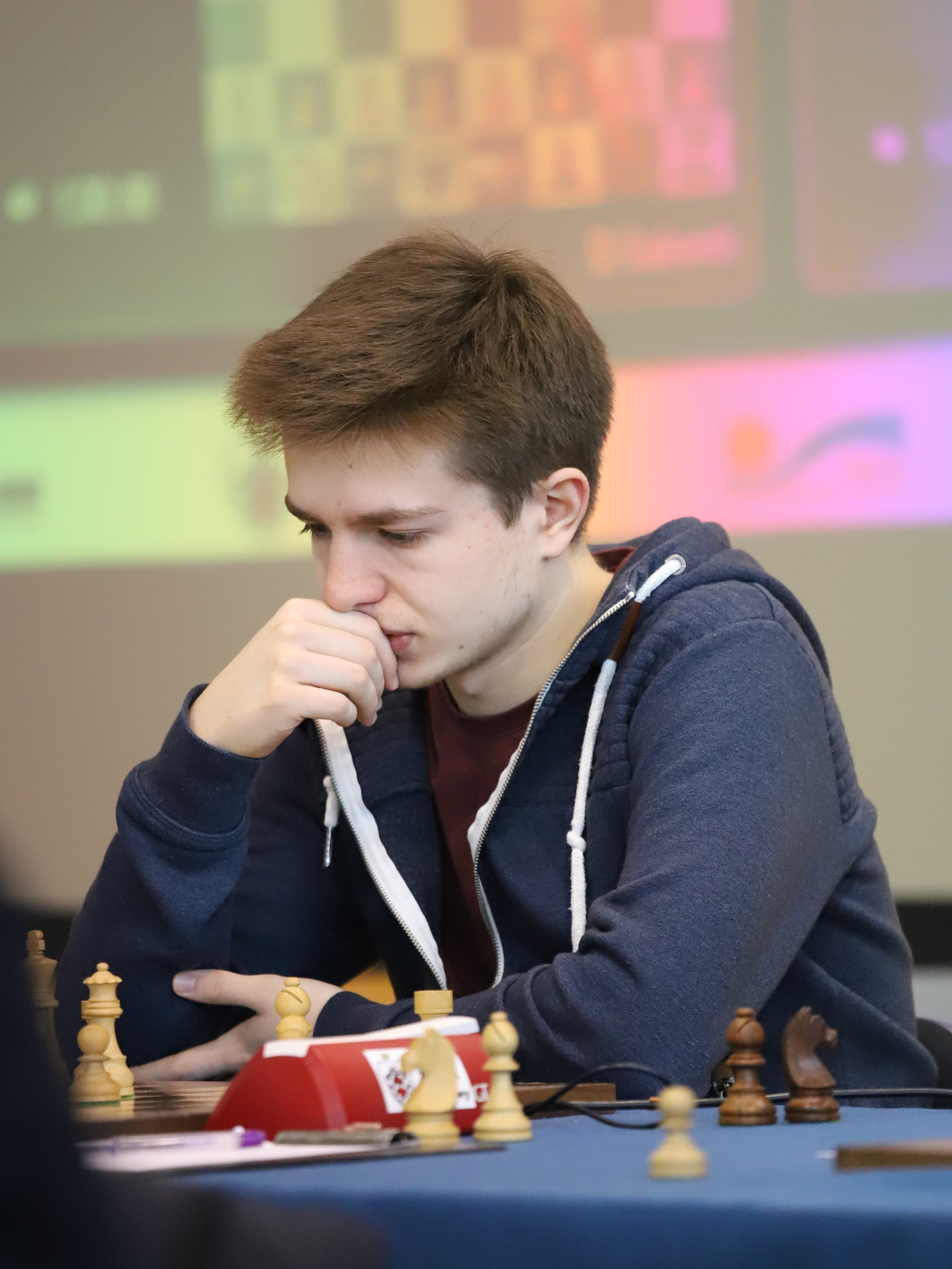
- Łukasz Jarmuła in 2019

Personal information
- Born: 10 November 1998 (age 27) Warsaw, Poland

Chess career
- Country: Poland
- Title: Grandmaster (2021)
- FIDE rating: 2412 (July 2026)
- Peak rating: 2512 (July 2018)

Łukasz Jarmuła (born 10 November 1998) is a Polish chess Grandmaster (GM) (2021).

== Biography ==
Łukasz Jarmuła started in the individual Polish Youth Chess Championships in 2010 in Wisła, where he took 6th place. He won the medals of the Polish Youth Chess Championships four times: gold in Szczyrk in 2013 in U16 age group, silver in Jastrzębia Góra in 2014 in U16 age group, silver in Karpacz in 2015 in U18 age group and gold in Szklarska Poręba in 2016 in U18 age group.

Łukasz Jarmuła was also a five-time silver medalist of the Polish Youth Rapid Chess Championships (Warsaw 2010 - U12 age group, Warsaw 2012 - U14 age group, Wrocław 2014 - U16 age group, Katowice 2015 - U18 age group and Koszalin 2016 - U18 age group) and a five-time medalist of the Polish Youth Blitz Chess Championships (including gold in Warsaw 2012 - U14 age group and Wrocław 2014 - U16 age group). He represented Poland at World Youth Chess Championship (5 times), European Youth Chess Championship (2 times), achieving the best result in 2016 in Prague (4th place at the European Youth Chess Championship in U18 age group). Łukasz Jarmuła managed to win the tournament once: 2011 in Warsaw (97th YMCA Autumn 2011-B). In 2017, he participated in Polish Chess Championship. In 2018, Łukasz Jarmuła won Polish Team Chess Championship with chess club WASKO Hetman GKS Katowice.

In 2015, he was awarded the FIDE International Master (IM) title and received the FIDE Grandmaster (GM) title six years later.
