= Łukasz Jarosiewicz =

Polish footballer

Personal information
- Date of birth: 8 August 1981 (age 45)
- Place of birth: Słupsk, Poland
- Height: 1.80 m (5 ft 11 in)
- Positions: Midfielder; forward

Team information
- Current team: Saturn Mielno
- Number: 2

Senior career*
Years	Team	Apps	(Gls)
1998–2001	Jantar Ustka		
2001–2003	Gwardia Koszalin		
2003–2006	Polonia Warsaw	46	(4)
2006	Znicz Pruszków		
2008–2009	AFC Fylde		
2009	Lamia		
2009–2010	Jantar Ustka		
2010	Pomorze Potęgowo		
2011	Kolejarz Stróże	15	(4)
2011	Gwardia Koszalin	15	(1)
2012–2013	Pomorze Potęgowo		
2013	Huntly		
2013	Formartine United		
2013	Banks o' Dee		
2014	AFC Blackpool		
2015	Jantar Ustka		
2016	Saturn Mielno		
2017	Darłovia Darłowo		
2017	SV Harkebrügge	13	(14)
2019	VfR Wardenburg	7	(4)
2023–2024	Wybrzeże Objazda	3	(3)
2024–	Saturn Mielno	7	(5)
- * Club domestic league appearances and goals as of 8 August 2024

Łukasz Jarosiewicz (born 8 August 1981) is a Polish footballer who plays as a midfielder for Klasa A club Saturn Mielno.

== Career ==
Jarosiewicz started his senior career with Jantar Ustka, before joining Gwardia Koszalin in 2001. In 2003, he signed for Polonia Warsaw in the Polish Ekstraklasa, where he made fifty-five appearances and scored ten goals. After that, he played for Polish club Znicz Pruszków, English club AFC Fylde, Greek club Lamia, Polish clubs Pomorze Potęgowo, Kolejarz Stróże, and Gwardia Koszalin, Scottish clubs Huntly and Formartine United, English club A.F.C. Blackpool, Polish clubs Saturn Mielno and Darłovia Darłowo, and German club SV Harkebrügge.
