= Łukasz Hanzel =

Polish footballer (born 1986)

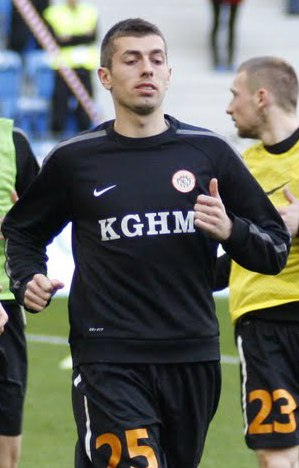
- Hanzel with Zagłębie Lubin in 2013

Personal information
- Full name: Łukasz Hanzel
- Date of birth: 16 September 1986 (age 40)
- Place of birth: Cieszyn, Poland
- Height: 1.82 m (5 ft 11 1/2 in)
- Position: Midfielder

Team information
- Current team: LKS Pogórze (player-manager)
- Number: 7

Youth career
- LKS Pogórze

Senior career*
Years	Team	Apps	(Gls)
2003–2005	Beskid Skoczów		
2005–2007	Rozwój Katowice		
2007–2013	Zagłębie Lubin	130	(5)
2013–2015	Piast Gliwice	54	(4)
2015	Wigry Suwałki	12	(3)
2016–2017	Ruch Chorzów	20	(0)
2017–2018	Podbeskidzie Bielsko-Biała	42	(1)
2018–2019	Skra Częstochowa	0	(0)
2019–2023	LKS Goczałkowice-Zdrój	123	(11)
2023–	LKS Pogórze	70	(19)

Managerial career
- 2023–: LKS Pogórze (player-manager)
- 2023–: LKS Pogórze II
- * Club domestic league appearances and goals as of 17:28, 30 June 2026 (UTC)

Łukasz Hanzel (born 16 September 1986) is a Polish footballer who is the current player-manager of regional league club LKS Pogórze.

== Club career ==
He is a trainee of LKS Pogórze. In July 2007, he joined Zagłębie Lubin.

In 2023, he joined LKS Pogórze as a player-manager. He also manages LKS Pogórze II in the Klasa B.

== Honours ==
Rozwój Katowice

- Polish Cup (Katowice regionals): 2006–07

LKS Goczałkowice-Zdrój

- IV liga Silesia II: 2019–20

== Notes ==
- Łukasz Hanzel at 90minut.pl (in Polish)
