= Chen Reiss =

Israeli operatic soprano

- חן רייס
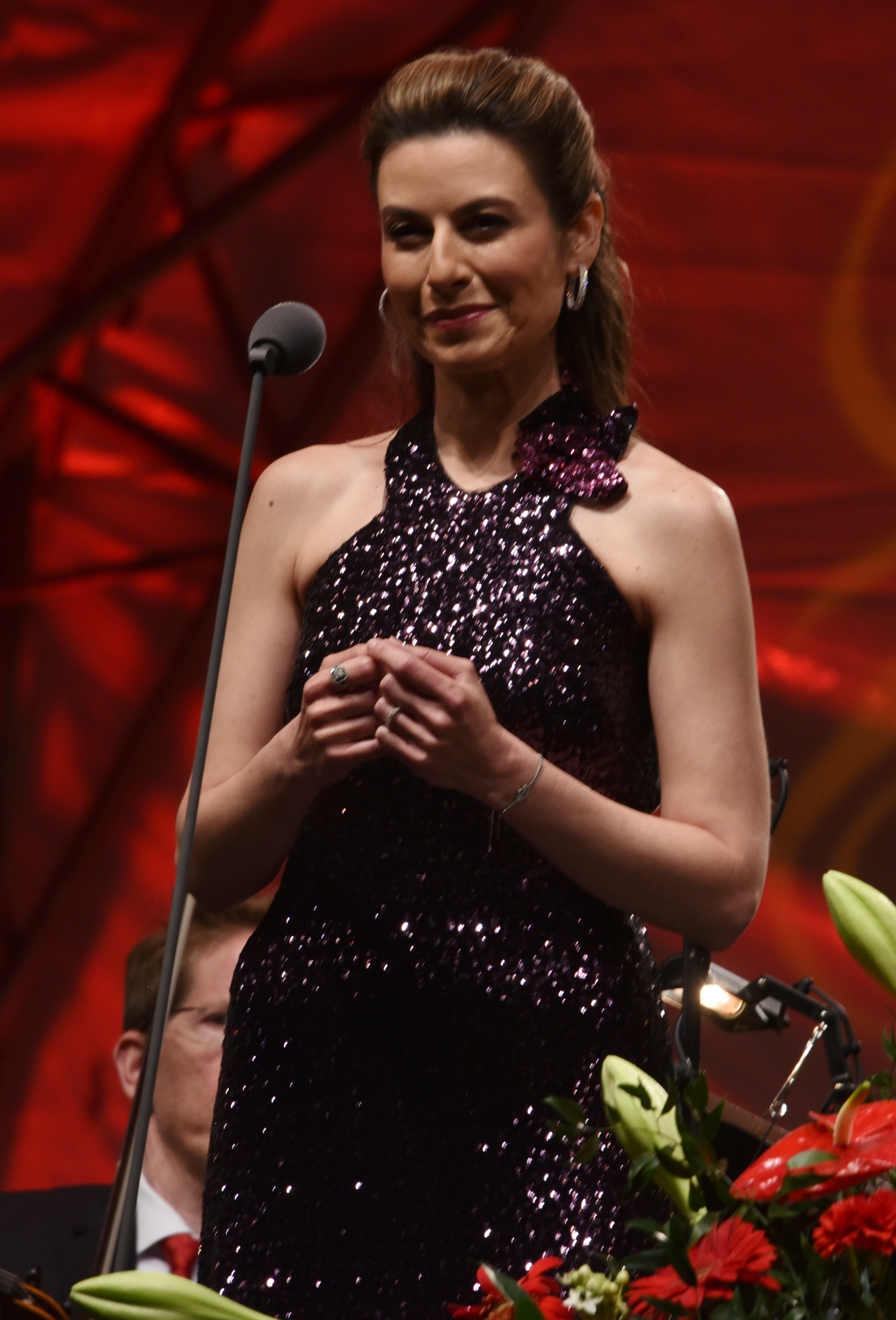
- Chen Reiss at Fest der Freude 2022
- Born: 1979 (age 46–47)
- Occupation: Operatic soprano
- Musical career
- Genre: Opera
- Instrument: Vocals

Chen Reiss (Hebrew: חן רייס; born 1979) is an Israeli operatic soprano. She began piano studies at age 5, ballet at age 7, and voice lessons at age 14. She decided to focus on vocal studies by age 16.

Reiss performed leading parts at the Vienna State Opera, Royal Opera House Covent Garden, Bavarian State Opera, Théâtre des Champs-Élysées, Teatro alla Scala, Semperoper Dresden, Deutsche Oper Berlin, Hamburg State Opera, Wiener Festwochen, Maggio Musicale Fiorentino, Opera Company of Philadelphia, Florida Grand Opera and the Israeli Opera.

Following compulsory military service and the start of formal vocal studies in Israel, Reiss moved to New York City at age 20. She subsequently joined the Bavarian State Opera in Munich, where Zubin Mehta became a mentor. She has a particular interest in music of the Viennese classical era and has worked regularly with the Vienna State Opera, following her debut with the company in 2009. In 2006, Chen Reiss recorded the soundtrack for the film "Das Parfüm" by director Tom Tykwer together with the Berliner Philharmoniker and Sir Simon Rattle. For the Christmas Eve 2014 Midnight Mass in St. Peter's Basilica, the Vatican. Reiss sang 'Et Incarnatus Est' from Mozart's Mass in c, K 427, where Pope Francis had requested this particular mass for this service.

Reiss recorded a CD with songs and arias by Mozart, Schubert, Spohr and Lachner accompanied by the WDR Radio Orchestra, released in 2009. Another CD with Italian songs by Schubert and Donizetti was released in 2007. Her CD "Liaisons" received a "Diapason d'Or" by French magazine Diapason in 2011. She has recorded a song recital album "Le Rossignol et la Rose" with pianist Charles Spencer.

In 2018, she made her debut at the Royal Opera House Covent Garden as Zerlina in Kasper Holten's production of Don Giovanni conducted by Marc Minkowski. In the same year she also made her debuts at the Teatro Real in Madrid and the Liceu in Barcelona as Ginevra (Ariodante) under William Christie, a role she also performed at the Vienna State Opera in David McVicar's new production. In 2017 she performed at the London Proms, Lucerne Festival, the George Enescu Festival in Romania; and at the Concertgebouw in Amsterdam under the baton of Daniele Gatti. In the same year she also made her debut with the Chicago Symphony under Charles Dutoit, Philharmonia Orchestra under Lahav Shani and sang Liu (Turandot) with the Israel Philharmonic Orchestra conducted by Zubin Mehta.

Other appearances include Zdenka (Arabella), Sophie (Der Rosenkavalier), Servilia (La clemenza di Tito), Marzelline (Fidelio), Adina (L'elisir d'amore), the Vixen (The Cunning Little Vixen). and Gretel with the Vienna State Opera. Also with the Vienna State Opera, she sang Ilia (Idomeneo) under Christoph Eschenbach in 2014 and Morgana (Alcina) under Marc Minkowski in 2016. The same year, with the Vienna Philharmonic under the baton of Zubin Mehta, she sang a gala concert for the 30th anniversary of the Suntory Hall in Tokyo.
