= Mks vir =

Polish antivirus software

mks_vir
- Original author: Marek Sell
- Developer: ArcaBit Sp. z o.o.
- Release: 1987; 39 years ago
- Operating system: MS-DOS, Windows, (Note: Supported Windows versions: 95, 98, Me, NT, 2000, XP, 2003, Vista, 2008, 7) Linux, BSD Unix, (Note: Supported BSD versions: FreeBSD, NetBSD, OpenBSD) Solaris
- Platform: x86, x86-64
- Available in: Polish
- Type: Antivirus software
- Website: mks-vir.pl

mks_vir (formerly: MkS_Vir) is a Polish antivirus program, created by Marek Sell in 1987.

The original reason for creation of this software was that the solutions existing on the market these times did not satisfy the author's needs. The first versions for MS-DOS were distributed on floppy disks by Apexim, the company in which Marek Sell worked. The updates were issued monthly and sent by mail. Initially, the software delivered to the users was personalized – the main screen contained the serial number and the data of the license owner. Despite that, the program was often used without license and its popularity can be confirmed by appearing Trojan horses, impersonating program updates, which were not issued yet. (Note: Versions of the program not issued due to Trojans impersonating them: 3.39 (January 1991), 3.62 (January 1993)) Later, together with the full version of the software, demo versions were issued, which allowed to use the program for a week. For educational reasons, the program contained descriptions of operation of some viruses (including demonstrations of their graphical and sound effects) and, from the 3.99 version, a lexicon of the viruses popular in Poland. In 1996, it became the winner of the third edition of the Teraz Polska contest.

In 1996, the MKS company, founded by Marek Sell, became the developer of the program. A website for the program and a BBS were created. The company continued the development of the program after the death of the author in 2004. Versions for Windows and Unix were created. An online scanner, based on the ActiveX technology, became available on the software website.

After the bankruptcy of the MKS company, in 2011, the property receiver sold the rights to the mks_vir trademark to the ArcaBit company, set up a few years earlier by the former MKS employees. It reactivated the mks_vir product as a free antivirus application.

Officially, the ArcaBit company resigned from the distribution and the support for the software on 2014, March 1. Although they released a brand new version during May 2018.

Some of the program versions:

- 3.12 (January 1991 – the first version described in the program history)
- 4.00 (April 1993)
- 5.00 (July 1994)
- 6.00 (September 1998)
- 2002
- 2003
- 2004
- 2005 (the last version for DOS)
- 2006 (the last version for Windows 98/Me)
- 2k7 (the first 64-bit version)
- 9 (the last version produced by MKS)
- 10 (announced multilingual version – not issued)
- 12 (the version based on the ArcaBit engine)
- 13.11 (the last version produced by ArcaBit)
- 2013 Internet Security (the last version, announced in February 2013 – not issued)
