= Łukasz Matusiak =

Polish footballer

Personal information
- Full name: Łukasz Matusiak
- Date of birth: 7 May 1985 (age 41)
- Place of birth: Poland
- Height: 1.87 m (6 ft 1 1/2 in)
- Position: Attacking midfielder

Team information
- Current team: Zagłębie Sosnowiec (assistant)

Senior career*
Years	Team	Apps	(Gls)
2003–2004	Widzew Łódź II		
2004–2008	Tur Turek	30	(2)
2008–2010	Podbeskidzie	63	(7)
2011–2012	Polonia Bytom	13	(0)
2012–2017	Zagłębie Sosnowiec	171	(15)
2017–2018	GKS Tychy	25	(1)
2018–2020	Polonia Bytom	42	(6)
2023	RKS Grodziec	12	(1)
2023–2024	Warta Kamieńskie Młyny	11	(1)
2024	LKS Bełk	13	(0)
2024–2026	Zagłębie Sosnowiec II	10	(0)

Managerial career
- 2020: Zagłębie Sosnowiec (caretaker)
- 2021: Zagłębie Sosnowiec (caretaker)
- * Club domestic league appearances and goals

Łukasz Matusiak (born 7 May 1985) is a Polish former professional footballer who played as an attacking midfielder. He currently serves as an assistant coach of Zagłębie Sosnowiec.

== Career ==
In February 2011, he was released from Podbeskidzie Bielsko-Biała. After tests, he signed a contract with Polonia Bytom.

== Honours ==
Tur Turek

- III liga, group II: 2006–07

Polonia Bytom

- IV liga Silesia I: 2018–19

Zagłębie Sosnowiec II

- Polish Cup (Sosnowiec regionals): 2024–25
