= Łukasz Merda =

Polish footballer

Personal information
- Full name: Łukasz Merda
- Date of birth: 4 May 1980 (age 46)
- Place of birth: Międzyrzecz, Poland
- Height: 1.89 m (6 ft 2 1/2 in)
- Position: Goalkeeper

Youth career
- 1993–1997: Obra Trzciel
- 1997–1999: Syrena Zbąszynek

Senior career*
Years	Team	Apps	(Gls)
2000–2003	Pogoń Świebodzin		
2003–2009	Podbeskidzie	156	(0)
2009–2010	Cracovia	12	(0)
2011–2017	Formacja Port 2000		
2017–2018	Orzeł Międzyrzecz	38	(0)
- * Club domestic league appearances and goals

Łukasz Merda (born 4 May 1980) is a Polish former professional footballer who played as a goalkeeper.

== Club career ==
Born in Międzyrzecz, Merda spent the vast majority of his career in his country's lower leagues, starting out at Miejski Klub Sportowy Pogoń Świebodzin. In the summer of 2009, he joined Ekstraklasa club KS Cracovia on a four-year contract.

During his two-year spell in Kraków, Merda only managed to appear in 13 competitive matches. His debut in the top flight arrived on 19 September 2009, in a 2–0 away defeat against Ruch Chorzów.

== Honours ==
Formacja Port 2000

- III liga Lower Silesia–Lubusz: 2014–15
