= Łukasz Juszkiewicz =

Polish footballer

Personal information
- Full name: Łukasz Juszkiewicz
- Date of birth: 9 March 1983 (age 43)
- Place of birth: Sulechów, Poland
- Height: 1.81 m (5 ft 11 in)
- Position: Midfielder

Youth career
- LSPM Zielona Góra

Senior career*
Years	Team	Apps	(Gls)
2001	Zryw Zielona Góra		
2001–2003	Lech/Zryw Zielona Góra		
2003	Lech Zielona Góra		
2004–2006	Górnik Zabrze	66	(0)
2007–2009	Widzew Łódź	62	(0)
2010	Wisła Płock	12	(0)
2010–2011	Zawisza Bydgoszcz	18	(0)
- * Club domestic league appearances and goals

Łukasz Juszkiewicz (born 9 March 1983) is a Polish former professional footballer who played as a midfielder.

== Career ==
=== Club ===
In February 2010, he moved to Wisła Płock on a one-year contract.

In July 2010, he joined Zawisza Bydgoszcz.

== Honours ==
Widzew Łódź

- I liga: 2008–09
