= Łukasz Maliszewski =

Polish footballer

Personal information
- Full name: Łukasz Maliszewski
- Date of birth: 27 April 1985 (age 41)
- Place of birth: Gorzów Wielkopolski, Poland
- Height: 1.84 m (6 ft 1/2 in)
- Position: Midfielder

Youth career
- Warta Gorzów Wielkopolski
- GKP Gorzów Wielkopolski

Senior career*
Years	Team	Apps	(Gls)
2003–2009	GKP Gorzów Wielkopolski	74	(8)
2010–2012	Korona Kielce	13	(0)
2012	→ Polonia Bytom (loan)	11	(1)
2013–2023	Stilon Gorzów Wielkopolski		

Managerial career
- 2023: Stilon Gorzów Wielkopolski (assistant)
- 2023–2025: Stilon Gorzów Wielkopolski
- * Club domestic league appearances and goals

Łukasz Maliszewski (born 27 April 1985) is a Polish professional football manager and former player who played as a midfielder. He was most recently the manager of Stilon Gorzów Wielkopolski.

== Managerial statistics ==
As of match played 15 March 2025

Managerial record by team and tenure
Team	From	To	Record							
Team	From	To	G	W	D	L	GF	GA	GD	Win %
Stilon Gorzów Wielkopolski	11 September 2023	16 March 2025	53	23	10	20	84	71	+13	43.40
Total			53	23	10	20	84	71	+13	43.40

== Honours ==
Stilon Gorzów Wielkopolski

- III liga, group III: 2007–08
- IV liga Lubusz: 2021–22
- Polish Cup (Lubusz regionals): 2014–15, 2015–16, 2016–17, 2018–19
