= Marcin Łukaszewski (footballer) =

Polish footballer (born 1978)

Personal information
- Full name: Marcin Łukaszewski
- Date of birth: March 15, 1978 (age 48)
- Place of birth: Bydgoszcz, Poland
- Height: 1.84 m (6 ft 1/2 in)
- Position: Defender

Senior career*
Years	Team	Apps	(Gls)
- Zawisza Bydgoszcz
- Pomorzanin Serock
- Chemik Bydgoszcz
2000–2001	Zawisza Bydgoszcz		
2001	Chemik/Zawisza Bydgoszcz		
2002–2005	Dyskobolia	49	(0)
2004	→ Świt NDM (loan)	8	(0)
2004-2005	→ Obra Kościan (loan)		
2006	Zawisza Bydgoszcz		
2007	Airdrie United	9	(0)
2007–2011	Zawisza Bydgoszcz	59	(3)
- * Club domestic league appearances and goals

Marcin Łukaszewski (born March 15, 1978, in Bydgoszcz) is a Polish former professional footballer who last played for Zawisza Bydgoszcz. In 2011 he suffered a career-ending injury.
