= Łukasz Pawlikowski =

Polish cellist (born 1997)

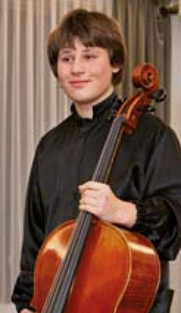
- Lukasz Pawlikowski in 2012

Background information
- Born: 14 August 1997 (age 28); Kraków, Poland
- Genres: Classical, Contemporary classical, Klezmer, Balkan, Tango
- Occupation: Musician
- Instrument: Cello
- Years active: 2004–present
- Label: NLD Records

Łukasz Pawlikowski (Polish: [ˈwukaʂ pavliˈkɔfskʲi]; born 14 August 1997) is a Polish cellist. He studied playing under Arto Noras, Jeroen Reuling, Witold Herman and Dorota Imiełowska. By the age of six he appeared at the Kraków Poetry Salon. He is connected with the Juliusz Słowacki Theatre. Pawlikowski debuted in 2006 with the Beethoven Academy Orchestra in the Tempel Synagogue. Since then, he has collaborated with artists such as Anna Polony, Anna Dymna, Zofia Kucówna, Elżbieta Stefańska, Mariola Cieniawa, Jerzy Trela, Jerzy Stuhr and Kevin Kenner. Under the direction of Krzysztof Penderecki he studied interpretation of his music. He performed as a soloist in Poland, Germany, Austria, Czech Republic, Slovakia, Hungary and Croatia.

== Biography ==
=== Early years ===
He began his musical education at the age of six, under Dorota Imiełowska. He also studied playing under Arto Noras, Jeroen Reuling and Witold Herman. By the age of six he appears at the Kraków Poetry Salon. At the age of eight years at the invitation of Elżbieta Penderecka at the Tempel Synagogue in concert performing David Popper's Hungarian Rapsody with the Beethoven Academy Orchestra. He gave world premiere performances of two works by Adam Walaciński and Mateusz Bień.

=== Work with Penderecki ===
In June 2010, Krzysztof Penderecki invited Pawlikowski to work under his direction on the interpretation of his Capriccio per Siegfried Palm and other contemporary oeuvres. He also participated, as a member of the group of ten Polish cellists, in the educational encounters with Arto Noras.

In November 2012, Pawlikowski was invited to play for opening of The European Krzysztof Penderecki Center for Music, first at the Polish Senate hall, second on the Center scene.

In November 2013, Pawlikowski performed as a soloist in Deutsche Oper Berlin on Penderecki's 80th anniversary concert.

== Festivals ==
He performed in numerous festivals, most important of which are:

- Jewish Culture Festival in Kraków, Poland, 2006-07-02
- Dni Muzyki Aleksandra Tansmana festival in Kraków, Poland, 2007-11-26
- Astor Piazzolla Tango Festival in Kraków, Poland, 2007-05-11
- 18. Międzynarodowe Dni Muzyki Kompozytorów Krakowskich Festival in Kraków, Poland, 2006-06-10
- Music in Old Cracow (Muzyka w Starym Krakowie) festival in Kraków, Poland, 2013-18

== Honors and awards ==
2004

- The 3rd Prize in the National Young Chamber Musicians' Spring Festival in Kraków, Poland

2006

- The 1st Prize in the International Young Chamber Musicians' Spring Festival in Kraków, Poland

2008

- The 1st Prize in the International Young Chamber Musicians' Spring Festival in Kraków, Poland
- The 1st Prize in the International Cello Competition in Liezen, Austria
- The President of Kraków Award for the outstanding achievements in the music competitions, Kraków, Poland
- The President of Kraków Educational Award, Kraków, Poland
- The 3rd Prize in the Antonio Janigro Cello Competition in Poreč, Croatia

2009

- The 1st Prize in the Talents for Europe in Dolný Kubín, Slovakia
- The 1st Prize in the National Competition for the Young Instrumentalists in Jasło, Poland

2010

- The 1st Prize in the International Festival of Contemporary Music for Children and Youth Srebrna Szybka in Kraków, Poland

2011

- The 1st Prize in the Kraków Young Talents Competition and Artur Malawski Special Prize in Kraków, Poland

2012

- The 1st Prize and Grand Prix in the National Competition for Young Instrumentalists in Jasło, Poland

== Discography ==
- The Bats Gallery (2010)
- Shalom, shalom! (2013)
