= Marcin Łukaszewski (musician) =

Polish author, pianist, music theorist and composer (born 1972)

Marcin Łukaszewski (20 November 1972, Częstochowa, Poland) is an author, pianist, music theorist and composer who graduated in 1996 from the Fryderyk Chopin University of Music in Warsaw. With two postgraduate diplomas on contemporary music and music theory from the Warsaw Music Academy, he is also the author of the monograph Wojciech Łukaszewski – życie i twórczość, on the life and work of his father, the composer Wojciech Łukaszewski, published by WSP Publishing (Wydawnictwo Wyższej Szkoły Pedagogicznej) in Częstochowa in 1997.

== Discography ==
- XXth Century Polish Piano Music (Acte Préalable AP0016, 1999)
- Franciszek Lessel - Complete Piano Works (Acte Préalable AP0022, AP0023, 1999)
- Piotr Perkowski – Piano Works (Acte Préalable AP0072, 2001–2002)
