= Lucas (given name) =

- Pronunciation: English: /ˈluːkəs/ Spanish: [ˈlukas] French: [lykɑ] Dutch: [ˈlykɑs] Portuguese: [ˈlukɐʃ]
- Gender: Male

Origin
- Origin: Latin
- Meaning: Light

Other names
- Related names: Luke, Lukas, Luc, Luca, Łukasz, Lluc, Luka, Loukas, Lluc

Lucas is a multilingual masculine given name of Latin origin. It is derived from the Latin verb "lucere", meaning "to shine". Lucas is used as a given name in Greek, English, Spanish, French, Dutch, and Portuguese.

== Different spellings across languages ==
- Amharic – Luqas (ሉቃስ)
- Arabic – Luqa (لوقا)
- Armenian - Ղուկաս, Ghukas
- Czech – Lukáš
- Dutch – Lucas / Lukas
- Estonian – Luukas
- Finnish – Luukas
- French – Lucas, Lukas
- German – Lukas
- Greek – Loukas (Λουκάς) – Ancient Greek (Λουκᾶς)
- Hungarian – Lukács / Lúkas / Lúkasz
- Icelandic – Lúkas
- Indonesian – Lukas, Lucas
- Irish: Lúcás
- Latin – Lucas (from the verb "lucere")
- Latvian – Lūkass
- Lithuanian – Lukas
- Norwegian / Swedish / Danish – Lucas / Lukas
- Anglo-Saxon – Lukas
- Polish – Łukasz
- Portuguese – Lucas
- Slovak – Lukáš
- Ukrainian - Лукаш
- Russian - Лукас / Лука
- Spanish – Lucas
- Turkish – Lukas
- Japanese - ルーカス
- Korean - 루카스

== Notable people ==
=== In arts and entertainment ===
- Lucas Bryant (born 1978), Canadian-American actor
- Lucas Cranach the Elder (1472–1553), German painter
- Lucas Cranach the Younger (1515–1586), German Renaissance painter
- Lucas Cruikshank (born 1993), American internet celebrity
- Lucas Frota (2000–2026), Brazilian record producer, musician and DJ
- Lucas Grabeel (born 1984), American actor
- Lucas Hedges (born 1996), American actor
- Lucas Jade Zumann (born 2000), American actor
- Lucas Lira, Brazilian YouTuber, entrepreneur and influencer
- Lucas Secon (born 1970), Danish-American rapper and music producer
- Lucas Till (born 1990), American actor
- Lucas van Leyden (1494–1533), Dutch painter
- Lucas Wong (born 1999), Hong Kong rapper

=== In politics, government, and religion ===
- Lucas (archbishop of Esztergom) (c. 1120–1181), Hungarian prelate and diplomat
- Lucas Atkinson (born 1981), American politician
- Lucas Bersamin (born 1949), Filipino judge
- Lucas Bolsius (born 1958), Dutch historian and politician
- Lucas Hartong (born 1963), Dutch politician
- Lucas Kerketta (born 1936), Indian bishop
- Lucas Papademos (born 1947), Greek bank official and prime minister
- Lucas Polese (born 1996), Brazilian politician
- Lucas Samalenge (1928–1961), Congolese and Katangese politician
- Lucas Schaal (born 1990), German politician

=== In sport ===
==== In association football ====
- Lucas Agüero (born 1997), Argentinian football player
- Lucas Andersen (born 1994), Danish professional footballer
- Lucas Biglia (born 1986), Argentine footballer
- Lucas Bergvall (born 2006), Swedish footballer, currently playing for Tottenham Hotspur
- Lucas Cano (born 1995), Argentine retired footballer
- Lucas Cavallini (born 1992), Canadian currently playing for Vancouver Whitecaps
- Lucas Hernandez (born 1996), French currently playing for Paris Saint-Germain
- Lucas Leiva (born 1987), Brazilian, formerly played for Lazio and Liverpool.
- Lucas Licht (born 1981), Argentine-Israeli currently playing for Gimnasia La Plata
- Lucas Lobos (born 1981), Argentine, played for Tigres UANL
- Lucas Moura (born 1992), Brazilian currently playing for São Paulo.
- Lucas Neill (born 1978), Australian, played for Galatasaray and Blackburn Rovers
- Lucas Paquetá (born 1997), Brazilian currently playing for West Ham United
- Lucas Pérez (born 1988), Spanish currently playing for Alavés
- Lucas Piazon (born 1994), Brazilian currently playing for Rio Ave
- Lucas Radebe (born 1969), South African, played for Leeds United and Kaizer Chiefs
- Lucas Rios Marques (born 1988), Brazilian currently playing for Figueirense
- Lucas Rougeaux (born 1994), French currently playing for OGC Nice
- Lucas Salinas (born 1995), Brazilian football player
- Lucas Severino (born 1979), Brazilian, played for FC Tokyo
- Lucas Silva, several people
- Lucas Torreira (born 1996), Uruguayan currently playing for Galatasaray
- Lucas Torró (born 1994), Spanish currently playing for Eintracht Frankfurt
- Lucas Vázquez (born 1991), Spanish currently playing for Real Madrid
- Lucas Zelarayán (born 1992), Argentine currently playing for Columbus Crew
- Lucas Zen (born 1991), Brazilian currently playing for Botafogo
- Jefferson Lucas Azevedo dos Santos (born 1984), Brazilian football player

==== In basketball ====
- Lucas Dias (born 1995), Brazilian player
- Lucas Mariano (born 1993), Brazilian player
- Lucas Mayer (born 1999), German player
- Lucas Mondelo (born 1967), Spanish coach
- Lucas Nogueira (born 1992), Brazilian player
- Lucas Tohătan (born 1999), Romanian player

==== In other sports ====
- Lucas Barbosa (gymnast) (born 1994), Brazilian aerobic gymnast
- Lucas Bitencourt (born 1994), Brazilian male artistic gymnast
- Lucas Pinheiro Braathen (born 2000), Norwegian-born Brazilian World Cup alpine ski racer
- Lucas Braun (born 2001), American baseball player
- Lucas Broussard (born 2006), American figure skater
- Lucas Browne (born 1979), Australian former professional boxer, mixed martial artist and kickboxer
- Lucas Bruchet (born 1991), Canadian track and field athlete
- Lucas Carneiro (born 2004), American football player
- Lucas Carvalho (born 1993), Brazilian sprinter
- Lucas Calabrese (born 1986), Argentine sailor
- Lucas Chanavat (born 1994), French cross-country skier
- Lucas Chanson (born 1962), Swiss judoka
- Lucas Chumbo (born 1995), Brazilian professional surfer
- Lucas Claerbout (born 1992), French badminton player
- Lucas Condotta (born 1997), Canadian professional ice hockey winger and captain
- Lucas Corvée (born 1993), French badminton player
- Lucas Créange (born 1992), French Paralympic table tennis player
- Lucas Daniel (born 1995), French competitive archer
- Lucas Didier (born 2003), French para table tennis player
- Lucas Duda (born 1986), American professional baseball player
- Lucas Eguibar (born 1994), Spanish snowboarder
- Lucas Eriksson (born 1996), Swedish cyclist
- Lukas Feurstein (born 2001), Austrian World Cup alpine ski racer
- Lucas Foster (snowboarder) (born 1999), American snowboarder
- Lucas Fratzscher (born 1994), German biathlete
- Lucas Giolito (born 1994), American professional baseball pitcher
- Lucas Glover (born 1979), American professional golfer
- Lucas González Amorosino (born 1985), Argentine rugby player
- Lucas di Grassi (born 1984), Brazilian racing car driver
- Lucas Guzmán (born 1994), Argentine taekwondo athlete
- Lucas Hammond (born 1993) Canadian rugby player
- Lucas Hatton (born 1995), professional strongman
- Lucas Havrisik (born 1999), American football player
- Lucas Henveaux (born 2000), Belgian competitive swimmer
- Lucas Herbert (born 1995), Australian professional golfer
- Lucas Krull (born 1998), American football player
- Lucas Lacamp (born 2001), professional rugby union player
- Lucas Luetge (born 1987), American professional baseball pitcher
- Lucas Martins (born 1988), Brazilian mixed martial artist
- Lucas Matthysse (born 1982), Argentine boxer
- Lucas Matzerath (born 2000), German swimmer
- Lucas Mazur (born 1997), French para-badminton player
- Lucca Mesinas (born 1996), Peruvian surfer
- Lucas Miedler (born 1996), Austrian tennis player
- Lucas Monteverde (born 1976), Argentine professional polo player
- Lucas Niang (born 1998), American football player
- Lucas Oluoch (born 1991), Kenyan cricketer
- Lucas Ostapiv (born 1997), Brazilian taekwondo practitioner
- Lucas Parsons (born 1969), Australian former professional golfer and chef
- Lucas Patrick (born 1993), American football player
- Lucas Pazat (born 1993), French male canoeist
- Lucas Puig (born 1987), French professional skateboarder
- Lucas Ramirez (born 2006), Dominican-Brazilian professional baseball player
- Lucas Raymond (born 2002), Swedish ice hockey player
- Lucas Rotich (born 1990), Kenyan long-distance runner
- Lucas Rual (born 1995), French sailor
- Lucas Saatkamp (born 1986), Brazilian volleyball player; generally known as "Lucas" or "Lucão"
- Lucas Salatta (born 1987), Brazilian backstroke swimmer
- Lucas Serme (born 1992), professional squash player who represented France
- Lucas Tobias (born 1999), Brazilian individual and synchronised trampoline gymnast
- Lucas Vita (born 1985), Brazilian water polo player
- Lucas Verthein (born 1998), Brazilian rower
- Lucas Werthein (born 1981), Argentine equestrian
- Lucas Zellmer (born 1977), German yacht racer

== Fictional characters ==
- Lucas (Mother 3), the main protagonist of the 2006 video game Mother 3
- Lucas (Pokémon), male protagonist of the games Pokémon Diamond, Pearl, and Platinum and the remakes Brilliant Diamond and Shining Pearl
- Lucas Fitzgerald, character in the Network Ten soap opera Neighbours
- Lucas Gottesman, a character in Pretty Little Liars
- Lucas Hay, character in Channel 4 soap opera Hollyoaks
- Lucas Hellinger, a character in the television series FlashForward
- Lucas Holden, character in the soap opera Home and Away
- Lucas Johnson, character in the BBC soap opera EastEnders
- Lucas Kane, main character in the Fahrenheit video game
- Lucas Kendall, a character from the television series Power Rangers Time Force
- Lucas Lee, teenage character in Scott Pilgrim vs. the World
- Lucas North, one of the main characters of the television series Spooks
- Lucas Roberts, character on the NBC soap opera Days of our Lives
- Lucas Scott, teen character on One Tree Hill
- Lucas Sinclair, a main character on Stranger Things
- Lucas the Spider
- Lucas Trent, Midnighter's secret identity
- Lucas Valieri, a character in Degrassi: The Next Generation
- Lucas Wolenczak, teenage character on SeaQuest DSV

== See also ==
- Lucas (disambiguation)
- Lucas (surname)
