= Luca (masculine given name) =

- Pronunciation: Italian: [ˈluːka] Romanian: [ˈluka]
- Gender: Male
- Language: Italian, Romanian

Origin
- Origin: Latin
- Meaning: "Light"

Other names
- Alternative spelling: Louca, Louka, Lucca
- Related names: Luke, Luc, Lucas, Luka, Lukas, Łukasz, Lluc

Luca is a masculine given name used mainly in Italy, Spain, Portugal, Romania, and Latin America. It is derived from the Latin name Lucas. It may also come from the Latin word "lucus" meaning "sacred wood" (a cognate of lucere).

Luca has risen in popularity as a name for boys in other countries. Its relation to the already popular names Lucas and Luke has been attributed to its popularity. It is common among Christians as a result of Luke the Evangelist. It was the third-most popular name for newborn boys in New Zealand in 2023 and is also common in Belgium, Germany, and the Netherlands. In 2022, it was the 27th most popular name given to boys in Canada. In the United States, the animated film Luca has been cited as influencing its usage of the name for boys.

== People ==
- Luca Andrada (born 2001), Argentine footballer
- Luca Arbore (1486–1523), Moldavian statesman
- Luca Attanasio (1977–2021), Italian diplomat
- Luca Badoer (born 1971) Italian racing driver
- Luca Badr (born 1992), Egyptian football player
- Luca Barbarossa (born 1961), Italian singer-songwriter
- Luca Beatrice (1961–2025), Italian art critic
- Luca Belcastro (born 1964), Italian composer
- Luca Brecel (born 1995), Belgian snooker player
- Luca Cappellari (born 1963), Italian racing driver
- Luca Caputi (born 1988), Canadian ice hockey player
- Luca Cicognola (born circa. 1990), Italian artist
- Luca Caragiale (1893–1921), Romanian poet
- Luca Ciriani (born 1967), Italian politician
- Luca Cordero di Montezemolo (born 1947), Italian businessman and former President of Ferrari
- Luca Cunti (born 1989), Swiss ice hockey player
- Luca Dalmonte (born 1963), Italian basketball coach
- Luca De Carlo (born 1972), Italian politician
- Luca Di Stefano (born 1990), Italian politician
- Luca Engstler (born 2000), German racing driver
- Luca Giordano (1634–1705), Italian painter
- Luca Guadagnino (born 1971), Italian film director
- Luca Harrington (born 2004), New Zealand freestyle skier
- Luca Langoni (born 2002), Argentine footballer
- Luca Marcogiuseppe (born 1980), Argentine football manager
- Luca Margaroli (born 1992), Swiss tennis player
- Luca Marinelli (born 1984), Italian actor
- Luca Martínez (born 2001), Argentine-Mexican footballer
- Luca Masso (born 1994), Argentine field hockey player
- Luca Napolitano (born 1982), Italian singer
- Luca Niculescu (born 1971), Romanian journalist and diplomat
- Luca Orellano (born 2000), Argentine footballer
- Luca Orozco (born 1995), Argentine footballer
- Luca Pacioli (1447–1517), Italian mathematician
- Luca Parmitano (born 1976), Italian astronaut
- Luca "Luke" Pasqualino (born 1990), British actor
- Luca "Lazylegz" Patuelli (born 1984), Canadian breakdancer
- Luca Preda (born 2006), Romanian tennis player
- Luca Prodan (1953–1987), Italian musician
- Luca Ragazzi (born 1971), Italian film director, screenwriter, journalist, and actor.
- Luca Rangoni (born 1968), Italian racing driver
- Luca Ranieri (born 1999), Italian football player
- Luca Ravanelli (born 1997), Italian football player
- Luca Righini (born 1990), Italian football player
- Luca Rigoni (born 1984), Italian football player
- Luca Rizzo (born 1992), Italian football player
- Luca della Robbia (1399–1482), Italian sculptor
- Luca Romagnoli (born 1961), Italian politician
- Luca Ronconi (1933–2015), Italian actor, theatre director, and opera director
- Luca Rossettini (born 1985), Italian football player
- Luca Sbisa (born 1990), Swiss ice hockey player
- Luca Sosa (born 1994), Argentine footballer
- Luca Spechenhauser (born 2000), Italian short-track speed skater
- Luca Toni (born 1977), Italian football player
- Luca Turilli (born 1972), Italian musician and composer
- Luca Valussi (born 1998), Argentine basketball player
- Luca Viişoreanu (born 2009), Romanian racing driver
- Luca Vildoza (born 1995), Argentine basketball player
- Luca Wackermann (born 1992), Italian cyclist
- Luca Waldschmidt (born 1996), German football player
- Luca Ward (born 1960), Italian actor
- Luca Zidane (born 1998), French football player
- Luca Greutert (born 2010), Swiss programmer at BSI AG

== Fictional characters ==
- Luca Abele, a major antagonist in the video game Dishonored 2
- Luca Blight, a major antagonist in the video game Suikoden II
- Luca Brasi, in the novel The Godfather and the film adaptation
- Luca Esposito, in the manga and anime Astra Lost in Space
- Luca McIntyre, a series regular in the soap opera Doctors
- Luca Paguro, the titular main character of the 2021 Pixar film Luca
- Luca Raregroove, a major enemy in the Japanese manga–anime series Rave Master
- Luca Tsukino, the titular main character in the 2019 film Doraemon: Nobita's Chronicle of the Moon Exploration
- Luca (The Bear), on the television series The Bear
- Luca, in the video game Angry Birds Stella
- Luca, a minor antagonist in the anime series Tweeny Witches
- Luca, one of the main cast in the mobile game series Dragalia Lost
- Luca, a supporting character from the rebooted Planet of the Apes film franchise (2011–2017)
- Luca, a green octopus in the 2004 animated film Shark Tale
- Luca, a recurring character in the Brazilian comic book series Monica and Friends
- Luca Silvestri, a minor antagonist in the video game Grand Theft Auto IV
- Luca Balsa, one of the survivors from the video game Identity V

== See also ==
- Luca (feminine given name)
- Luca (surname)
- Luka (given name)
