= Lluch =

Lluch is a Catalan surname. It derives from the Catalan name Lluc: (Note: Not the common noun with various euphemistic meanings) both a place name in the Balearics and a masculine given name, with distinct etymologies. (Note: Lluc can also be a feminine given name, as a shortened form of María de Lluc, which comes from the place name.) The place name comes from Latin lūcus, "sacred woodland", and the given name from that of Luke the Evangelist.

== People ==
Notable people with the surname include:

- Antoni Rubió i Lluch (1856–1937), Spanish historian
- Cata Coll (b. 2001), Spanish football goalkeeper
- Daniel Martí (born 1973), Spanish pole vaulter
- Ernest Lluch (1937–2000), Spanish economist and politician
- Francisco Lluch Mora (1924–2006), Puerto Rican historian
- Joaquín Lluch y Garriga (1816–1882), Spanish prelate
- Joan Soler (1881–1961), Spanish football goalkeeper
- Juana María Condesa Lluch (1862–1916), Spanish nun
- Miguel Lluch (1922–2016), French-born Spanish director
- Rosa Lluch Bramon, Spanish historian
- Sergio Lozano (born 1999), Spanish footballer
- Vicente Rojo Lluch (1894–1966), Spanish military officer
