= Lukas =

- Pronunciation: German: [ˈluːkas] Swedish: [ˈlʉ̌ːkas]
- Gender: Male

Origin
- Meaning: "Light"

Other names
- Related names: Lukáš, Luke, Luc, Luca, Lucas, Lukasz, Lluc

Lukas is a form of the Greek name Λουκάς, which can be alternatively Romanized as Loukas, Luke, or Lucas.

== People named Lukas ==
- Lukáš, lists people with this Czech and Slovak name or surname

=== As a surname ===
- Aino-Eevi Lukas (1930–2019), Estonian equestrian, lawyer and politician
- D. Wayne Lukas (born 1935), American horse racing trainer
- Florian Lukas (born 1973), German actor
- György Lukács (1885–1971), Hungarian philosopher
- Ingrid Lukas (born 1984), Estonian singer-songwriter, pianist and bandleader
- J. Anthony Lukas (1933–1997), American journalist
- Jens Lukas (born 1966), German distance runner
- Kim Lukas (born 1977), English pop singer
- Paul Lukas (journalist) (born 1964), American sports writer
- Tena Lukas (born 1995), Croatian tennis player
- Tõnis Lukas (born 1962), Estonian politician

=== As a given name ===
- Lukas Alsys (born 1995), Lithuanian politician
- Lukas Dauser (born 1993), German male artistic gymnast
- Lukas Denis (born 1997), American football player
- Lukas Fankhauser, Swiss curler
- Lukas Forchhammer (born 1988), Danish lead singer of band Lukas Graham
- Lukas Foss (1922–2009), American conductor
- Lukas Gage (born 1995), American actor
- Lukas Haas (born 1976), American actor
- Lukas Hartmann (born 1944), Swiss novelist and children's literature writer
- Lukas Heller (1930–1988), German-born British screenwriter
- Lukas Hofer (born 1989), Italian biathlete
- Lukas Hradecky (born 1989), Finnish football (soccer) goalkeeper
- Lukas Jungwirth (born 2004), Austrian footballer
- Lukas Jutkiewicz (born 1989), English football (soccer) player
- Lukas Kampa (born 1986), German professional volleyball player
- Lukas Kirkegaard (born 2005), Danish footballer
- Lukas Lerager (born 1993), Danish footballer
- Lukas Lundin (1958–2022), Swedish billionaire
- Lukas Märtens (born 2001), German swimmer
- Lukas MacNaughton (born 1995), Canadian football (soccer) player
- Lukas Moodysson (born 1969), Swedish film writer and director
- Lukas Nathanson (born 1986), Swedish record producer, composer, and songwriter
- Lukas Podolski (born 1985), German football (soccer) player
- Lukas Reinken (born 1995), German politician
- Lukas Rieger (born 1999), German pop singer
- Lukas Rossi (born 1976), Canadian musician
- Lukas Runggaldier (born 1987), Italian Nordic combined athlete
- Lukas Schmitz (born 1988), German football (soccer) player
- Lukas Sieper (born 1997), German politician
- Lukas Tudor (born 1969), Chilean football (soccer) forward
- Lukas Van Ness (born 2001), American football player
- Lukas Verzbicas (born 1993), Lithuanian-American athlete
- Lukas Walton (born 1986), American billionaire
- Lukas Weißhaidinger (born 1992), Austrian discus thrower and shot putter

== Fictional characters ==
- Lukas, former mercenary in the Japanese web manga Centuria
