= Loukas =

Loukas (Greek: Λουκᾶς/Λουκάς) is a Greek (male) first name. It is the Greek form of the Latin name Lucas. This name is often given to honor Luke the Evangelist.

== People with the given name Loukas ==
- Loukas Apostolidis, a Greek footballer
- Loukas Barlos, a Greek businessman
- Loukas Daralas, a Greek musician
- Loukas Yorkas, a Greek-Cypriot singer
- Loukas Hadjiloukas, a Cypriot football manager
- Loukas Kanakaris-Roufos, a Greek politician
- Loukas Karadimos, a Greek footballer
- Loukas Karakatsanis, a Greek footballer
- Loukas Louka (footballer) (born 1978), Cypriot football defender
- Loukas Louka (athlete) (born 1945), retired Greek Cypriot shot putter
- Loukas Mavrokefalidis, a Greek basketball player
- Loukas Notaras, the last Megas Doux of the Byzantine Empire
- Loukas Panourgias, a Greek footballer
- Loukas Papadimos, Greek economist and prime minister
- Loukas Stylianou, a Cypriot football defender
- Loukas Vyntra, a Czech-Greek footballer

== People with the surname Loukas ==
- Christina Loukas (born 1985), an American diver
- Loukas Louka (footballer) (born 1978), Cypriot football defender
- Loukas Louka (athlete) (born 1945), retired Greek Cypriot shot putter
- Marios Louka (born 1982), a Cypriot footballer

== See also ==
- Hosios Loukas, a Greek monastery
- Lucas (disambiguation)
- Loukas, a village in the former municipality of Mantineia, 10 km south of the village of Nestani, on the eastern edge of Arcadia, in the east of the Peloponnese peninsular.
