= Cafu (disambiguation) =

Cafu (Marcos Evangelista de Morais; born 1970) is a Brazilian former professional footballer.

Cafu may also refer to:

- Cafú (footballer, born 1977), full name Arlindo Gomes Semedo, Cape Verdean football forward
- Cafú (footballer, born 1993), full name Carlos Miguel Ribeiro Dias, Portuguese footballer
- Cafu (footballer, born 1996), full name Octacilio Brito Alves, Brazilian footballer
- Jonathan Cafú, (born 1991), Brazilian footballer (winger)
- Wanderson Cafu (born 1986), Brazilian football right back
