= Mitte 2 (electoral district) =

State electoral district of Germany

- Electoral district for the Berlin House of Representatives
- Mitte 2 in 2026
- District: Mitte
- Electorate: 33,885 (2026)

Current electoral district
- Party: Die Linke
- Member: Leonard Diederich

Mitte 2 is an electoral constituency (German: Wahlkreis) represented in the House of Representatives of Berlin. It elects one member via first-past-the-post voting.

== Geography ==
The constituency comprises the areas of Alexanderplatz, Engelbecken, and Leipziger Platz within the borough of Mitte.

There were 32,640 eligible voters in 2023.

== Members ==
Election	Member	Party	%
1995	Carola Bluhm	PDS	49.3
1999	Carola Bluhm	PDS	53.2
2001	Carola Bluhm	PDS	52.3
2006	Carola Bluhm	Die Linke	32.1
2011	Carola Bluhm	Die Linke	31.2
2016	Carola Bluhm	Die Linke	27.9
2021	Max Landero	SPD	22.1
2023	Lucas Schaal	CDU	22.1
2026	Leonard Diederich	Die Linke	28.2

== Election results ==
=== 2026 election ===
State election (2026): Mitte 1
Notes:	Blue background denotes the winner of the electorate vote. Pink background denotes a candidate elected from their party list. Yellow background denotes an electorate win by a list member, or other incumbent. A ✓ or ✗ denotes status of any incumbent, win or lose respectively.						
Party	Candidate	Votes	%	±%	Party votes	%	±%
Left	✓ Leonard Diederich	6,978	28.2	▲11.5	7,513	30.1	▲12.5
CDU	✗ Lucas Schaal	4,918	19.8	▼5.1	4,596	18.4	▼5.8
Greens	Katja Zimmermann	4,575	18.5	▼1.6	3,749	15.0	▼4.5
SPD	Nadine Riez	2,898	11.7	▼9.8	2,694	10.8	▼6.8
AfD	Jens-Hermann Priegnitz	2,780	11.2	▲4.4	2,932	11.7	▲4.7
BSW	Sevim Dağdelen	1,278	5.2		1,340	5.4	
Volt	Rainer Seider	725	2.9		730	2.9	▲1.6
FDP	Eren Güvercin	631	2.5	▼2.6	745	3.0	▼3.2
Tierschutzpartei					333	1.3	▼0.3
PARTEI					152	0.6	▼0.7
PdF					58	0.2	
DKP					55	0.2	▼0.1
ÖDP					28	0.1	Steady
du.					19	0.1	▼0.1
SGP					13	0.1	Steady
Informal votes		409			235		
Total valid votes		24,783			24,957		
Turnout		25,192	74.3	▲9.9			
Left gain from CDU	Majority	2,060	8.4				

=== 2023 repeat election ===
Changes denoted below for the 2023 election are compared to the 2016 election, as the 2021 election was declared invalid.

State election (2023): Mitte 2
Notes:	Blue background denotes the winner of the electorate vote. Pink background denotes a candidate elected from their party list. Yellow background denotes an electorate win by a list member, or other incumbent. A ✓ or ✗ denotes status of any incumbent, win or lose respectively.						
Party	Candidate	Votes	%	±%	Party votes	%	±%
CDU	Lucas Schaal	5,195	24.9	▲10.9	5,064	24.2	▲10.7
SPD	Max Landero	4,485	21.5	▼2.3	3,667	17.6	▼1.5
Greens	Stefan Lehmkühler	4,180	20.0	▲6.4	4,070	19.5	▲5.1
Left	Imke Elliesen-Kliefoth	3,478	16.7	▼11.2	3,677	17.6	▼8.8
AfD	Jürgen Mickley	1,415	6.8	▼5.2	1,476	7.1	▼5.3
FDP	Michael Bahles	1,076	5.2	▼0.5	1,299	6.2	▼0.5
Tierschutzpartei	Karin Nicole Wiecha	418	2.0		339	1.6	▲0.5
Volt					269	1.3	
PARTEI	Ulrike Jothe	392	1.9		266	1.3	▼0.7
dieBasis	Karin Zacharias-Langhans	151	0.7		104	0.5	
Team Todenhöfer					75	0.4	
DKP					69	0.3	▼0.1
Independent	Karl-Heinz Witte	63	0.3				
The Grays					62	0.3	
Gray Panthers					61	0.3	▼0.4
Pirates					54	0.3	▼1.3
Klimaliste					54	0.3	
Humanists					48	0.2	
du.					47	0.2	
Mieterpartei					41	0.2	
Verjüngungsforschung					39	0.2	▼0.2
FW					24	0.1	
ÖDP					19	0.1	
SGP					15	0.1	Steady
NPD					14	0.1	▼0.2
Bergpartei, die ÜberPartei					13	0.1	
Bildet Berlin!					9	0.0	
The Pinks/Alliance 21					6	0.0	
LKR					5	0.0	▼0.4
BüSo					4	0.0	▼0.1
Informal votes		141			126		
Total valid votes		20,853			20,890		
Turnout		21,031	64.4	▼3.7			
CDU gain from Left	Majority	710	3.4				

=== 2021 election (annulled) ===
The election in 2021 was annulled and rerun in 2023.

State election (2021): Mitte 2
Notes:	Blue background denotes the winner of the electorate vote. Pink background denotes a candidate elected from their party list. Yellow background denotes an electorate win by a list member, or other incumbent. A ✓ or ✗ denotes status of any incumbent, win or lose respectively.						
Party	Candidate	Votes	%	±%	Party votes	%	±%
SPD	Max Landero	5,555	21.9	▼2.0	5,011	19.7	▲0.6
Greens	Stefan Lehmkühler	5,250	20.7	▲7.1	5,006	19.6	▲5.3
Left	Imke Elliesen-Kliefoth	5,144	20.3	▼7.6	5,272	20.7	▼5.7
CDU	Lucas Schaal	4,151	16.4	▲2.3	3,731	14.6	▲1.1
FDP	Michael Bahles	2,071	8.2	▲2.5	2,232	8.8	▲2.0
AfD	Jürgen Mickley	1,534	6.0	▼6.0	1,520	6.0	▼6.4
PARTEI	Ulrike Jothe	614	2.4		470	1.8	▼0.1
Tierschutzpartei	Karin Nicole Wiecha	585	2.3		386	1.5	▲0.4
Volt					401	1.6	
dieBasis	Karin Zacharias-Langhans	365	1.4		282	1.1	
Team Todenhöfer					174	0.7	
FW					154	0.6	
The Grays					105	0.4	
Pirates					103	0.4	▼1.2
Independent	Karl-Heinz Witte	94	0.4				
Klimaliste					83	0.3	
Gray Panthers					78	0.3	▼0.4
DKP					74	0.3	▼0.1
Humanists					64	0.3	
APT					59	0.2	
Verjüngungsforschung					52	0.2	▼0.2
du.					51	0.2	
Mieterpartei					33	0.1	
Bildet Berlin!					25	0.1	
Bergpartei, die ÜberPartei					23	0.1	
NPD					22	0.1	▼0.2
ÖDP					21	0.1	
LKR					19	0.1	▼0.3
The Pinks/Alliance 21					11	0.0	
SGP					10	0.0	▼0.1
BüSo					7	0.0	▼0.1
Informal votes		259			177		
Total valid votes		25,622			25,656		
Turnout		25,711	78.5	▲10.3			
SPD gain from Left	Majority	305	1.2				

== See also ==
- Politics of Berlin
- House of Representatives of Berlin
