= Polese =

Polese is a surname. Notable people with the surname include:

- Giovanni Polese (1873–1952), Italian operatic baritone
- Kim Polese (born 1961), American entrepreneur and technology executive
- Lucas Polese (born 1996), Brazilian politician
- Tobia Polese (1865–1905), Italian painter
