= Luc =

Luc or LUC may refer to:

== Places ==
- Luc, Hautes-Pyrénées, France, a commune
- Luc, Lozère, France, a commune
- Le Luc, France, a commune
- Luč, Baranja, Croatia, a settlement

== People and fictional characters ==
- L.U.C., stage name of Łukasz Rostkowski, Polish rapper and music producer, creator of the film score for the 2023 film The Peasants
- Luc (given name)
- Luc (surname)
- Luc Opie

== Academia ==
- Leiden University College The Hague, a liberal arts & sciences honours college in the Netherlands
- Limburgs Universitair Centrum, now University of Hasselt, Belgium
- Loyola University Chicago

== Other uses ==
- Land-use change
- LUC, cryptosystem based on Lucas sequences

== See also ==
- Château de Luc, a French castle-ruin in the town of Luc in the Lozère département
- Luc-en-Diois, France, a commune
- Luc-la-Primaube, France, a commune
- Luc-sur-Mer, France, a commune
- Saint-Luc (disambiguation)
- Luk (disambiguation)
