= Lluc =

Male given name

- Pronunciation: [ˈʎuk]
- Gender: Male
- Language: Catalan

Origin
- Region of origin: Catalonia

Other names
- Related names: Lucas, Lukas, Luca, Łukasz

Lluc is a Catalan masculine given name, derived from Greek Λουκᾶς, Lukas. Notable people with the surname include:

- Lluc Castell (born 2006), Spanish footballer
- Lluc Crusellas (born 1996), Spanish pastry chef
- Lluc Ibàñez (born 2000), Spanish racing driver
- Lluc Salellas (born 1984), Spanish journalist and politician

== See also ==
- Santuari de Lluc, monastery and pilgrimage site in Escorca, Spain
- Lluch, Catalan surname
- Lucas
- Lukas
