= Valussi =

Valussi is an Italian surname. Notable people with the surname include:

- Luca Valussi (born 1998), Argentine basketball player
- Víctor Valussi (1912–1995), Argentine footballer
