= Lucas Silva =

Lucas Silva may refer to:

- Lucas Silva (footballer, born 1980) (Lucas da Silva Lucas), Brazilian football defender
- Lucas Silva (footballer, born 1984) (Lucas Antônio Silva de Oliveira), Brazilian football midfielder
- Lucas Silva (footballer, born 1985) (Lucas Borges da Silva), Brazilian football midfielder
- Lucas Silva (footballer, born 1990) (Lucas Espindola da Silva), Brazilian football striker
- Lucas Gomes (footballer, born 1990) (Lucas Gomes da Silva), Brazilian football forward
- Lucas Silva (footballer, born 1993) (Lucas Silva Borges), Brazilian football midfielder
- Lucas Silva (footballer, born 1994) (Lucas Silva de Oliveira), Brazilian football forward
- Lucas Silva (footballer, born 1997) (Lucas Silva dos Santos), Brazilian football defender
- Lucas Silva (footballer, born 1998) (Lucas da Silva de Jesus), Brazilian football winger
- Lucas Rodrigues (footballer, born 1999) (Lucas Rodrigues da Silva), Brazilian football winger
- Lucas Silva (footballer, born 2006) (Lucas Manuel Silva Ferreira), Portuguese football winger
- Lucas Silva (footballer, born 2007) (Lucas Gabriel Silva), Argentine football midfielder
