= Loukas Louka =

Loukas Louka may refer to:

- Loukas Louka (footballer) (born 1978), Cypriot football defender
- Loukas Louka (shot putter) (born 1945), retired Greek Cypriot shot putter
