= Leonard Diederich =

German politician (born 1993)

Member of the Berlin House of Representatives
- Assuming office 29 October 2026
- Succeeding: Lucas Schaal
- Constituency: Mitte 2

Personal details
- Born: 1993 (age 32–33)
- Party: Die Linke (since 2015)

Leonard Diederich (born 1993) is a German politician who was elected member of the Berlin House of Representatives in 2026. He has served as co-group leader of Die Linke in the borough council of Mitte since 2024.
