= Lucas =

Lucas or LUCAS may refer to:

== People ==
- Lucas (given name)
- Lucas (surname)

== Arts and entertainment ==
- Luca Family Singers, or the Lucas, a 19th-century African-American singing group
- Lucas, a 1960s Swedish pop group formed by Janne Lucas Persson
- Lucas (album) (2007), an album by Skeletons and the Kings of All Cities
- Lucas (1986 film), an American romantic-comedy teen film
- Lucas (2021 film), a Spanish thriller drama film
- Lucas (novel) (2003), by Kevin Brooks
- Lucas, a character in the video game: Mother 3

== Organisations ==
- Lucas Industries, a former British manufacturer of motor industry and aerospace industry components
- Lucasfilm, an American film and television production company
- LucasVarity, a defunct British automotive parts manufacturer, successor to Lucas Industries

== Places ==
=== Australia ===
- Lucas, Victoria

=== Mexico ===
- Cabo San Lucas, Baja California

=== United States ===
- Lucas, Iowa
- Lucas County, Iowa
- Lucas, Kansas
- Lucas, Kentucky
- Lucas, Michigan
- Lucas, Missouri
- Lucas, Ohio
- Lucas County, Ohio
- Lucas, South Dakota
- Lucas, Texas
- Lucas, Wisconsin
- Lucas Township (disambiguation)

== Other uses ==
=== LUCAS acronym ===
- Laboratory Unit for Computer Assisted Surgery
- Laser Utilizing Communication System, a Japanese satellite with laser communications
- Leeds University Centre for African Studies
- Low-cost Uncrewed Combat Attack System, US loitering attack drones
- Lund University Cardiopulmonary Assist System, chest compression machine used for CPR

=== Things named Lucas ===
- A. B. Lucas Secondary School, London, Ontario, Canada
- Lucas critique, in economics
- Lucas sequence, of integer numbers
- Lucas Oil Stadium, Indianapolis, Indiana, US

== See also ==
- Luca (disambiguation)
- Lucas & Steve, a Dutch DJ duo
- Justice Lucas (disambiguation)
- Lukas, a form of the Latin name Lucas
- Łukasz, a Polish masculine given name
- Leuchars, a town and parish in Scotland
- De Lucas, a surname
- Luke (disambiguation)
- Lucas The Spider (A film)
