= Lukes =

Lukes or Lukeš is a surname. "Lukeš" is a variant of the surname Lukáš. Notable people with the surname include:

- František Lukeš (born 1982), Czech ice hockey player
- Jaroslav Lukeš (born 1912), Czech skier
- Konstantina Lukes (born 1941), American state politician
- Martin Lukeš (born 1978), Czech footballer
- Nathan Lukes (born 1994), American baseball player
- Radek Lukeš (born 1979), Czech ice hockey goaltender
- Steven Lukes (born 1941), English academic
- William F. Lukes (1847–1923), United States Navy sailor, recipient of the Medal of Honor

== Fictional ==
- Martin Lukes, fictional character featured in Financial Times column
