= Wanderson Cafu =

Brazilian footballer

Personal information
- Full name: Wanderson Gustavo da Silva
- Date of birth: 18 March 1986 (age 40)
- Place of birth: José Bonifácio, Brazil
- Height: 1.82 m (6 ft 0 in)
- Position: Right back

Team information
- Current team: Campinense

Senior career*
Years	Team	Apps	(Gls)
2006	Figueirense	0	(0)
2006	Brusquense	0	(0)
2007	Mirassol	0	(0)
2007	Remo	7	(1)
2007–2008	São Caetano	0	(0)
2008	→ Americano (loan)	0	(0)
2008	→ Noroeste (loan)	2	(0)
2009	Rio Preto	0	(0)
2009	Francana	0	(0)
2010	Ferroviária	0	(0)
2010	Campinense	6	(0)
2010	América (RN)	12	(1)
2011	Grêmio Barueri	0	(0)
2011	ICASA	5	(0)
2011–	Campinense		
- * Club domestic league appearances and goals

Wanderson Gustavo da Silva, known as Wanderson Cafu or just Cafu (born 18 March 1986) is a Brazilian footballer who plays for Campinense.

== Biography ==
Born in José Bonifácio, São Paulo, Cafu started his professional career for Figueirense. In July 2006 he was signed by Sport Club Brusquense in 1-year contract, which played in 2006 Divisão de Acesso of Santa Catarina state championship.

In February 2007 he was signed by Mirassol in 2-year contract. After the end of 2007 second division of São Paulo state championship, he was signed by Brazilian second division team Remo, as understudy of Lucas Silva. In September he left for São Caetano in 3-year deal. In January he left for Americano and in June for Noroeste of Brazilian third division. In February 2009 he was signed by Rio Preto of São Paulo second division and in June signed by Francana in 1-year contract. After played in 2009 Copa Paulista de Futebol, he was signed by Ferroviária for São Paulo third division in January 2010. In June he was signed by Campinense until the end of 2009 Brazilian third division, which the team did not qualify to the second stage. Cafu himself left for América de Natal in September, which the team relegated from 2010 Brazilian second division.

In January 2011 he was signed by Grêmio Barueri. After the end of São Paulo state championship, he was signed by ICASA in May.

On 3 August 2011 he was signed by Campinense.
