= Judge Lucas =

Judge Lucas may refer to:

- John Baptiste Charles Lucas (1758–1842), judge of the Pennsylvania Court of Common Pleas and judge of the United States District Court for the District of Louisiana
- Malcolm Lucas (1927–2016), judge of the United States District Court for the Central District of California before serving as Chief Justice of California

== See also ==
- Justice Lucas (disambiguation)
