= Lluc Crusellas =

Catalan pastry chef and chocolatier

Lluc Crusellas (b. Santa Eulàlia de Riuprimer, age 29–30) is a Catalan pastry chef who in 2022 received the title of best chocolatier in the world at the World Chocolate Masters (WCM) international competition held in Paris.

Lluc started in the pastry world at a young age. At the age of seventeen, he helped chef Nandu Jubany prepare the desserts at his Michelin-award restaurant, and then trained at the prestigious Hofmann School of Pastry and Espai Sucre in Barcelona. After working at the Josep Maria Rodríguez patisserie (winner of La Coupe du Monde de la Pâtisserie award) in Barcelona, where he learned production methods, organization and team work, in 2018 he joined Carme Pastisseria in Vic as pastry chef and the Pavic group, which manages several patisserie shops and bread ovens throughout Osona. The highlight of his career was in 2021, when he became the best chocolate maker in Spain by winning the World Chocolate Masters Spain and, one year later, in 2022, he made his dream come true: winning the final of the World Chocolate Masters 2022. A dream that has continued with the creation of his chocolate brand: EUKARYA, Lluc Crusellas’ chocolate, through which he brings us a tasting of artisanal chocolate products such as chocolates, nougats, chocolate bars, cocoa cream, hot chocolate, or cocoa powder. He has worked with professionals from other disciplines, such as the Barcelona design company Makeat, with whom he has designed 3D creations. The work that allowed him into the WMC final was a chocolate sculpture inspired by the spiral shape of DNA and floral motifs. Similarly, he won the WMC 2022 final with a reproduction of a standing chocolate elephant showing the two possible faces of the future.
