= Lucas Township =

Lucas Township may refer to one of the following townships in the United States:

- Lucas Township, Crittenden County, Arkansas
- Lucas Township, Effingham County, Illinois
- Lucas Township, Lyon County, Minnesota

== See also ==
- Lucas (disambiguation)
