= Calldetenes =

- Municipality
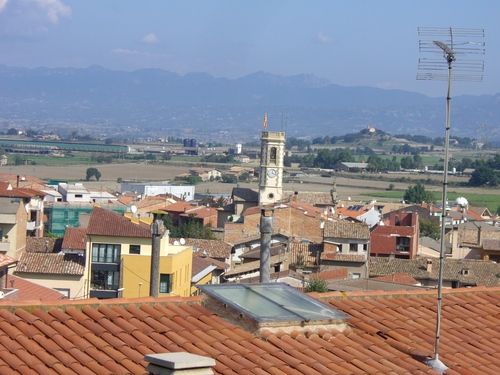
- Calldetenes

- Flag Coat of arms

- Location in Catalonia
- Coordinates: 41°55′39″N 2°17′5″E
- Country: Spain
- Community: Catalonia
- Province: Barcelona
- Comarca: Osona

Government
  - Mayor: Marc Verdaguer Montanyà (2015) (Convergence and Union)

Area
  - Total: 5.8 km^{2} (2.2 sq mi)
- Elevation: 482 m (1,581 ft)

Population (2025-01-01)
  - Total: 2,733
  - Density: 470/km^{2} (1,200/sq mi)
- Postal code: 08506
- Website: www.calldetenes.cat

Calldetenes (Old Catalan for 'quarter of shops'; Catalan pronunciation: [ˌkaʎðəˈtenəs]) is a municipality in the comarca of Osona in Catalonia. The Michelin-starred restaurant Can Jubany is located here.

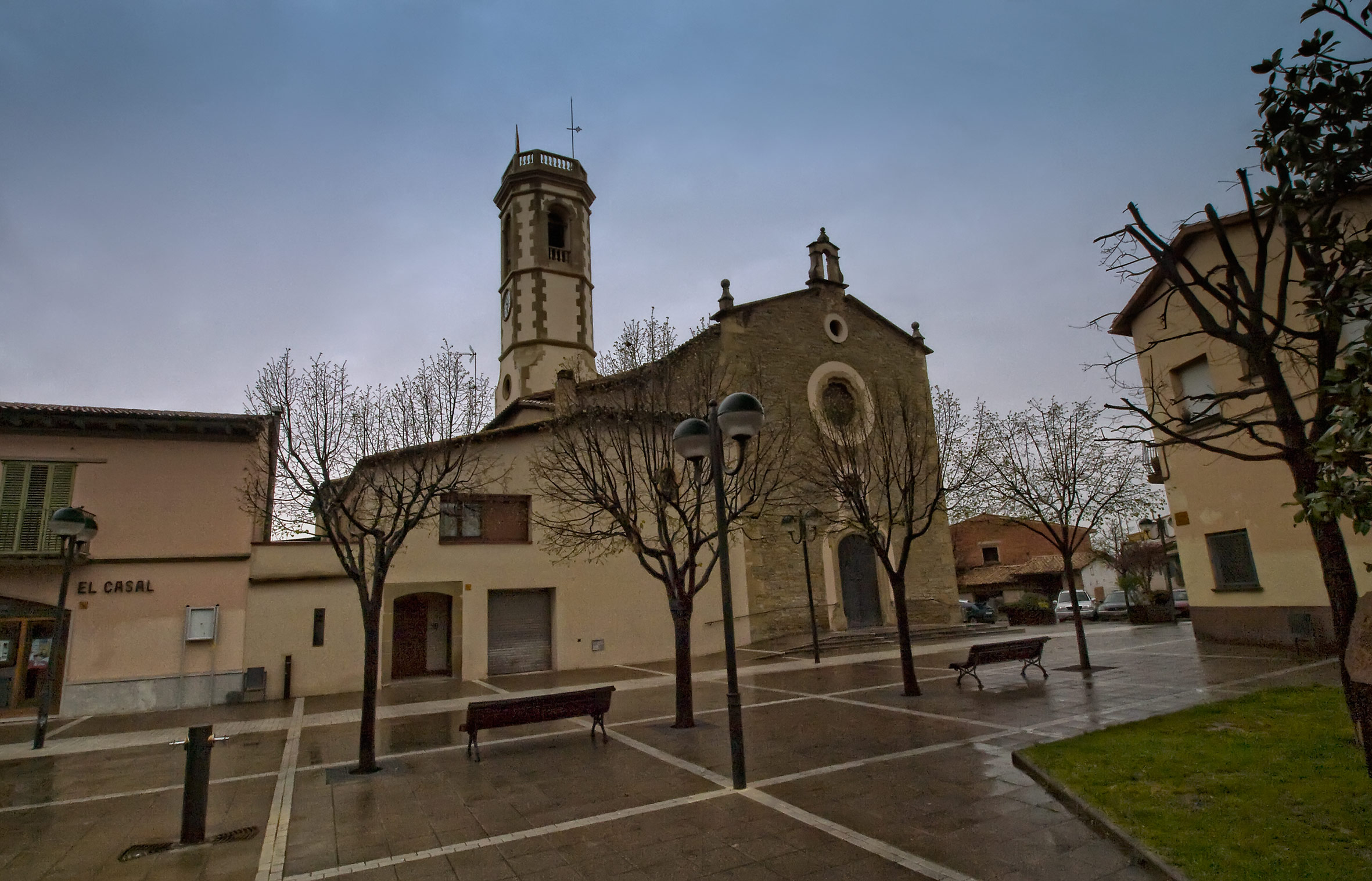
Parish Church of Calldetenes
