= Clement of Sardice =

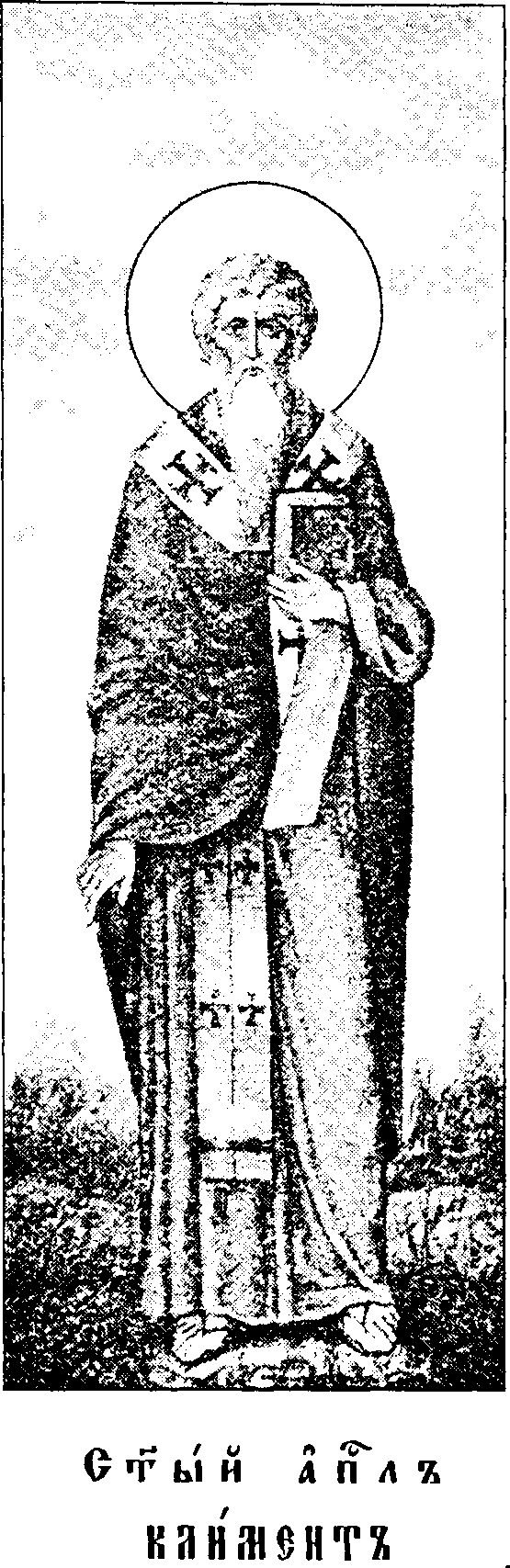

Clement of Sardis is numbered among the Seventy Disciples. He was Bishop of Sardis. The Church remembers St. Clement on January 4 with the Seventy; April 22 with Ss. Nathaniel and Luke; and on September 10 with Ss. Apelles and Lucius.

== Sources ==
St. Nikolai Velimirovic, The Prologue from Ohrid
