= Luk =

Luk or LUK may refer to:

== Surname ==
Luk or Loke is the Cantonese romanization of several (but not all) Chinese surnames that are romanized as Lu in Mandarin. It may refer to:

- Lu (surname 陆)
- Lu (surname 禄)
- Lu (surname 逯)
- Lu (surname 鹿)

== Other uses ==
- Luk (band), a Ukrainian band
- LuK, a Schaeffler Group brand
- Cincinnati Municipal Lunken Airport, US, IATA airport code
- Leucadia National, US company, NYSE symbol
- LUK Internacional, a Spanish distribution and licensing company

== See also ==
- Gospel of Luke
- Luc (surname)
