= Julinho (footballer, born 1979) =

Brazilian footballer

Personal information
- Full name: Júlio César Teixeira
- Date of birth: 18 June 1979 (age 47)
- Place of birth: Ecoporanga, Brazil
- Height: 1.76 m (5 ft 9 1/2 in)
- Position: Left-back

Senior career*
Years	Team	Apps	(Gls)
2000–2003	Paulista		
2004	Corinthians	0	(0)
2004	Sport Recife		
2005	Paulista		
2006	Coritiba	0	(0)
2006–2007	Remo	45	(4)
2008	Atlético (GO)		
2009	Sorocaba	0	(0)
2009–2010	Paulista	4	(0)
2010	Itauçu	0	(0)
2011	Campinense	0	(0)
2011	Goianésia	0	(0)
2012	XV de Jaú	7	(1)
- * Club domestic league appearances and goals

Júlio César Teixeira known as Julinho (the diminutive form of Júlio, born 18 June 1979) is a Brazilian former footballer.

== Biography ==
Born in Espírito Santo state, Julinho started his career in Paulista Futebol Clube. In 2004, he left for Corinthians. He left Corinthians in April. In mid-2004 he was signed by Sport Recife and made his debut in June.

In 2005, he signed a 1-year deal with Paulista Futebol Clube. He won the champion of 2005 Copa do Brasil and finished as the 15th in the second division.

In December 2005 he left for Coritiba until the end of 2006 Paraná state championship. In April he left for fellow Série B club Remo. Later Paulista team-mate Lucas also joined Remo and played on both flanks. His contract was extended in January 2007.

In January 2008 he left for Goiás club Atlético Clube Goianiense until the end of the state championship. In May his contract was extended, winning 2008 Brazilian third division.

In January 2009 he was signed by Clube Atlético Sorocaba until the end of São Paulo state championship second division. The club finished as the 15th.

In May 2009 Julinho returned to Jundiaí in 1-year deal. The club later signed Lucas to aim for success in 2009 season. Julinho only played the first two matches of the fourth division and in the knock-out stage. He finished as the runner-up of 2009 São Paulo state cup. He played 11 times in 2010 São Paulo state first division.

In July 2010 he returned to Goiás for Itauçu Esporte Clube. The club finished eighth in the 2010 Goiás state championship second division.

Julinho was signed by Campinense in January 2011 in 1-year contract. In February he left for Goianésia until the end of 2011 Goiás state championship first division. The club finished seventh.

== Honours ==
- Copa do Brasil: 2005
- Campeonato Brasileiro Série C: 2008
