= Albert Tarradas =

Spanish politician

Alberto Tarradas
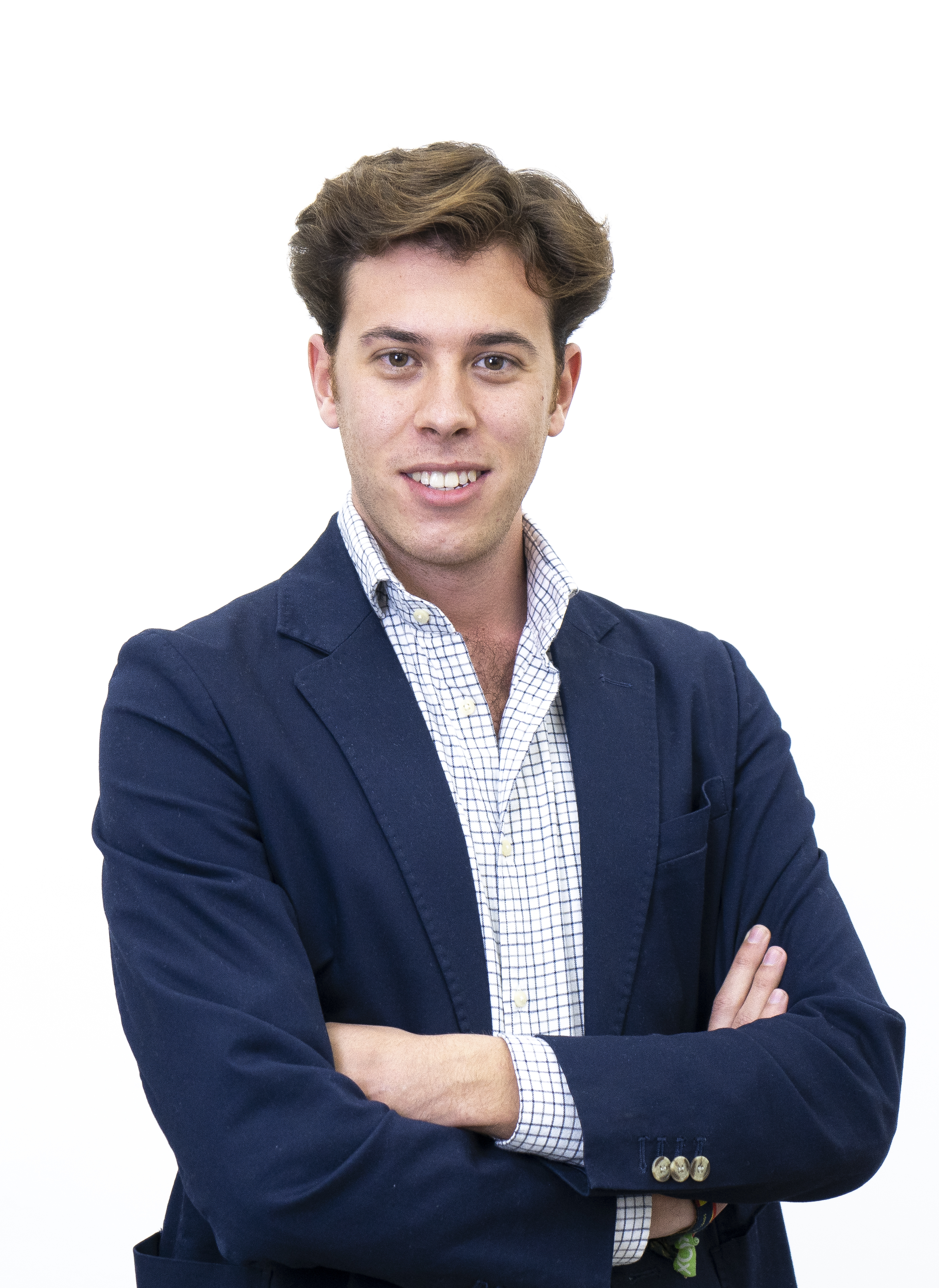

Member of the Parliament of Catalonia
- Incumbent
- Assumed office 12 March 2021

Personal details
- Born: Alberto Tarradas Paneque; 1996 (age 29–30) Girona, Spain
- Party: Vox

Albert Tarradas Paneque (born 1996) is a Spanish politician and a member of the Parliament of Catalonia for the Vox party.

Tarradas was born to a Catalan family in Girona. He speaks Catalan, Spanish, English and Italian.

He is the president of Vox in Girona and headed the list for the party in the Girona constituency during the 2021 Catalan regional election in which he was elected. He is currently the youngest representative in the Catalan Parliament.
