= Dolors Bramon =

Spanish philologist, historian and university professor

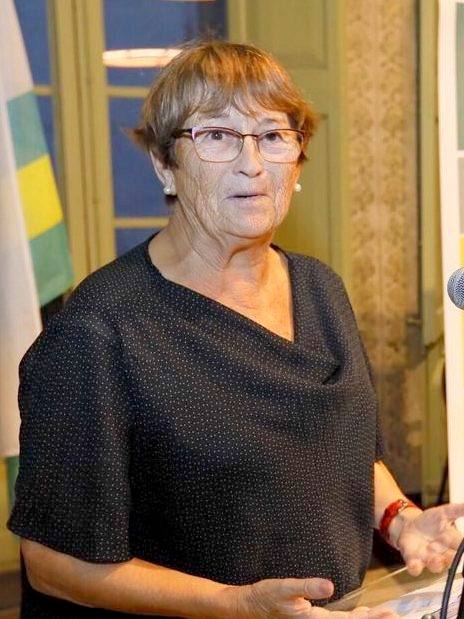
- Born: Maria Dolors Bramon Planes; 31 December 1943 (age 82); Banyoles, Spain
- Education: University of Barcelona
- Occupation: Academic
- Employers: University of Barcelona; University of Zaragoza
- Organizations: Associació d'Escriptors en Llengua Catalana; Institut d'Estudis Catalans
- Spouse: Ernest Lluch (1966–1982)
- Awards: Joan Fuster Essay Award (1976, 1981)

Maria Dolors Bramon Planes (born 31 December 1943) is a Spanish philologist, historian, and university professor specializing in the Muslim world.

== Biography ==
Dolors Bramon married Ernest Lluch in 1966, with whom she had three daughters – Eulàlia, Rosa, and Mireia – and whom she accompanied to Valencia in 1970 when he joined its University. They lived there for a decade, until 1977.

From 1968 to 1983 she was an editor of the Gran Enciclopèdia Catalana. In December 1977 she graduated from the University of Barcelona, where from 1979 to 1984 she was an assistant professor and received a doctorate in Semitic Philology.

In 1984 she became an interim assistant professor at the University of Zaragoza, and secured a titled position in 1986. A year later, in December 1987, she returned to the University of Barcelona as a full professor of Arab and Islamic Studies. In 1998 she received her doctorate in Medieval History.

A specialist in the Islamic period in the Crown of Aragon, and especially in Catalonia, Bramon's work has focused on the presence of religious minorities (Mudejars, Jews) in these territories, Islamic theology, women in Islam, as well as philological studies on the influence and presence of Arabisms in the languages of the Iberian Peninsula.

In 1990 she was appointed director of the Historical Archive of Banyoles, a position which she held until February 2008. She was also advisor of the Lexographic and Onomastic Offices of the Institut d'Estudis Catalans beginning in 2000, and collaborator at the Philological Section of the Institute beginning in 2002.

In 2004 she became a professor of Islam at the Higher Institute of Religious Sciences of Barcelona.

She is currently a member of the Historical-Archaeological Section at the Institut d'Estudis Catalans, the Associació d'Escriptors en Llengua Catalana (AELC), the International Group of Studies and Reflection on Women and Islam (GIERFI), and the Research Forum on the Arab and Muslim World (FIMAM), among other institutions.

Since 2014 she has been president of the World University Service of the Mediterranean (WUSMED).

== Awards ==
- 1976 Joan Fuster Essay Award for Una lengua, dos lenguas, tres lenguas, as a member of a group of six people who presented a set of works
- 1981 Joan Fuster Essay Award for Contra moros i jueus (Contra moros y judíos)

== Works ==
- Raons d'identitat del País Valencià. Pèls i senyals (1976)
- Egipto (1979), Editorial Castell, Barcelona ISBN 8474890217
- Contra moros i jueus: Formació i estratègia d'unes discriminacions al País Valencià (1981), ISBN 8475020526
  - Spanish translation: Contra moros y judíos (1986), Ed. Península, Barcelona, ISBN 8429723838
- El mundo en el siglo XII. Estudio de la versión castellana de una geografía universal: El Tratado de al-Zuhrî (1991), Ed. Ausa, Sabadell, ISBN 8486329752
- Nous Textos d'historiadors musulmans referents a la Catalunya Medieval (continuació de l'obra de Josep Maria Millàs i Vallicrosa), doctoral thesis, published under the same title by the University of Barcelona in 1999, ISBN 8447521621
- De quan érem o no musulmans. Textos del 713 al 1010 (2000), ISBN 8476024509
- Una introducción al islam: religión, historia y cultura (2002), ISBN 8484323587
- Mots remots. Setze estudis d'història i de toponímia catalana (2002), CCG edicions, Gerona, with Rosa Lluch Bramon
- Ser dona i musulmana (2007), Ed. Cruïlla and Fundación Joan Maragall, Barcelona, ISBN 8495483246
  - Spanish translation: Ser mujer y musulmana (2009), Ed. Bellaterra, Barcelona
- En torno al islam y las musulmanas (2010), Ed. Bellaterra, Barcelona
- Moros, jueus i cristians en terra catalana. Memòria del nostre passat (2013), Pagès editor, Lérida, ISBN 9788499753140
  - Spanish translation: Moros, judíos y cristianos en tierra catalana. Memoria de nuestro pasado (2013), Ed. Milenio, Lérida
- L'islam avui. Alguns aspectes controvertits (2016), Fragmenta Editorial, Barcelona, ISBN 9788415518440
