= Luc (surname) =

Luc is a surname. Notable persons with that name include:

- Giraut del Luc (fl. 1190–1197), French troubadour
- Jacques de Saint-Luc, (1616–c. 1710), Walloon lutenist and composer
- Jean-André de Luc (1727–1817), Swiss geologist and meteorologist
- Jeff Luc (born 1992), American football player
- Michel Luc (1927-2010), French zoologist
- Sylvain Luc (1965-2024), French jazz guitarist

== See also ==
- Luc (given name)
- Luc (disambiguation)
