= Luc Louves =

French basketball player (born 1989)

Luc Louves (born 22 February 1989, in Pau) is a French basketball player who played 19 games for French Pro A league club Orleans from 2007 to 2009.
