= Can Jubany =

Restaurant of catalan cuisine owned by the chef Nandu Jubany

Restaurant information
- Head chef: Nandu Jubany
- Rating: (Michelin Guide)
- Location: Calldetenes, Spain
- Coordinates: 41°55′45″N 002°18′04″E
- Website: https://canjubany.com/

Can Jubany is a Catalan restaurant in Calldetenes, Catalonia. Chef Nandu Jubany raises vegetables, herbs, and livestock for his refined versions of traditional Catalan cuisine.

== See also ==
- Local food
