= Max Landero =

German politician (born 1991)

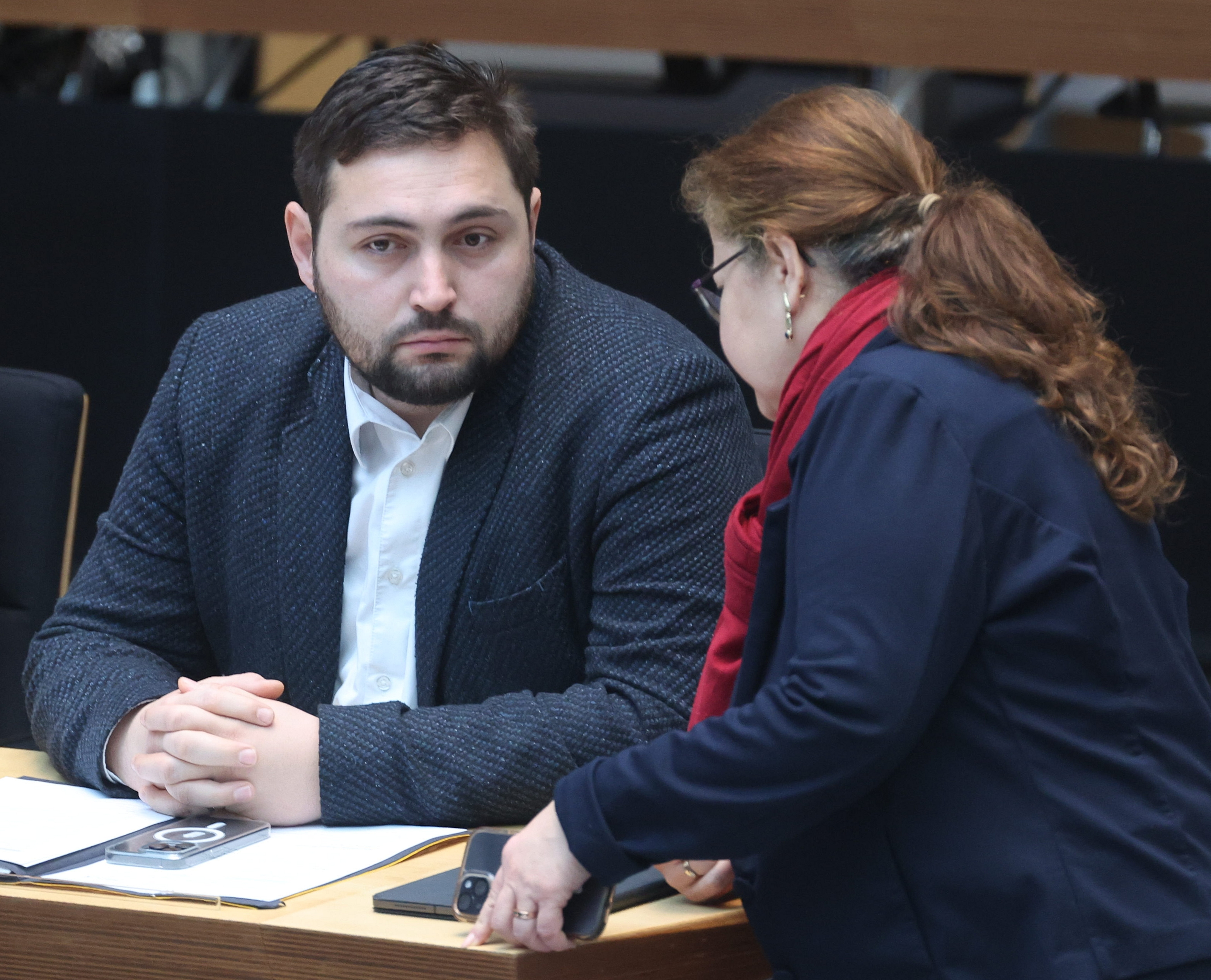
- Landero in 2024

Member of the Abgeordnetenhaus of Berlin
- In office 4 November 2021 – 16 March 2023
- Preceded by: Carola Bluhm
- Succeeded by: Lucas Schaal
- Constituency: Mitte 2

Personal details
- Born: 1991 (age 34–35) Berlin
- Party: Social Democratic Party

Max Landero Alvarado (born 1991 in Berlin) is a German politician serving as state secretary of integration, anti-discrimination and diversity of Berlin since 2023. From 2021 to 2023, he was a member of the Abgeordnetenhaus of Berlin.
