= Radek Lukeš =

Czech ice hockey goaltender

- Born: January 5, 1979 (age 46)
- Height: 5 ft 8 in (173 cm)
- Weight: 170 lb (77 kg; 12 st 2 lb)
- Position: Goaltender
- Caught: Right
- Played for: HC České Budějovice; Rapaces de Gap; Sangliers Arvernes de Clermont; Chamonix HC; Yétis du Mont-Blanc
- Playing career: 1998–2015

Radek Lukeš (born January 5, 1979) is a Czech former professional ice hockey goaltender.

Lukeš began his career with HC České Budějovice and played two games for their senior side during the 1997–98 Czech Extraliga season. He then spent eight seasons in France, playing for Rapaces de Gap, Sangliers Arvernes de Clermont, Chamonix HC and Yétis du Mont-Blanc between 2001 and 2009.
