= Arnadi =

Arnadi: Αρναδί (Greek); Kuzucuk (Turkish)
- Village
- Location in Cyprus
- Coordinates: 35°14′11″N 33°51′35″E
- Country (de jure): Cyprus
  - District: Famagusta District
- Country (de facto): Northern Cyprus
  - District: İskele District

Government
  - Mukhtar: Türkeş Öğünçer

Population (2011)
  - Total: 344
- Time zone: UTC+2 (EET)
  - Summer (DST): UTC+3 (EEST)

Arnadi (Greek: Αρναδί; Turkish: Kuzucuk) is a village in Cyprus, located north of Famagusta. It is under the de facto control of Northern Cyprus.
