= Justice Lucas =

Justice Lucas may refer to:

- Daniel B. Lucas (1836–1909), associate justice of the Supreme Court of Appeals of West Virginia
- Malcolm Lucas (1927–2016), chief justice of the Supreme Court California
- Raymond B. Lucas (1890–1966), associate justice of the Supreme Court of Missouri

== See also ==
- Judge Lucas (disambiguation)
