= Lucas Silva (footballer, born 1980) =

Brazilian footballer

Personal information
- Full name: Lucas da Silva Lucas
- Date of birth: 25 November 1980 (age 45)
- Place of birth: Jundiai, Brazil
- Height: 1.74 m (5 ft 9 in)
- Position: Right back

Team information
- Current team: Nacional (AM)

Senior career*
Years	Team	Apps	(Gls)
- ?
2003–2006	Paulista FC		
2005	→ Juventude (loan)	7	(0)
2006	→ Remo (loan)	21	(0)
2007	Remo	23	(3)
2008	Sertãozinho	0	(0)
2008–2009	Gama	24	(2)
2009–2010	Paulista FC	5	(1)
2010	Chapecoense	2	(0)
2011	São José (SP)	0	(0)
2011	Nacional (AM)	5	(2)
2012–	Ferroviária		
- * Club domestic league appearances and goals

Lucas da Silva Lucas known as Lucas Silva or just Lucas (born 25 November 1980) is a Brazilian footballer, who plays for Nacional (AM).

== Biography ==
Lucas signed a 3-year contract with Paulista FC in 2003.

In September 2005, he was signed by Juventude.

In August 2006, he was signed by Remo, re-joining Paulista team-mate Julinho. He played 2 seasons in 2008 Brazilian second division as first choice right-back, replacing Marquinhos.

In January 2008, he left for Sertãozinho until the end of São Paulo state championship. In April 2008, he was signed by Gama until the end of 2008 Brazilian second division, playing along with his namesake Lucas. After the club relegated, he signed a new 1-year deal.

In June 2009, he returned to Paulista FC for a 1 year deal. The club also re-signed Julinho early in May. He played in Brazilian fourth division and 2010 São Paulo state championship.

In June 2010, he was signed by Chapecoense until the end of Brazilian third division.

In the 2011 season, he played 17 games for São José in 2011 second division of São Paulo state. In July, he left for Nacional (AM).

== Honours ==
- Copa do Brasil: 2005
