= Rosa Lluch Bramon =

Spanish historian, university professor and academic secretary

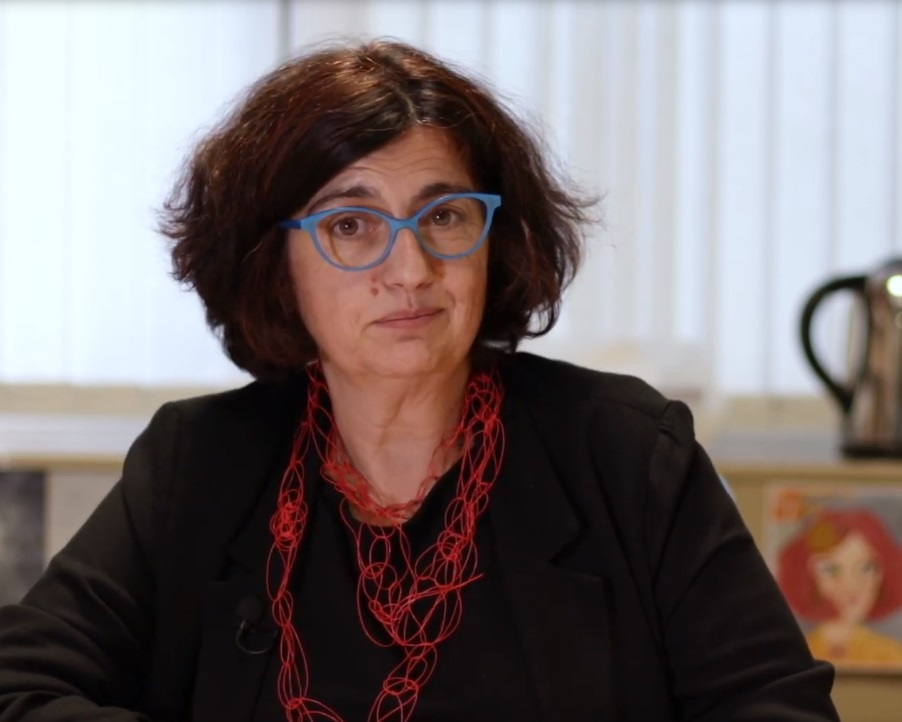
- Interviewed by Cuarto Poder
- Born: 1969 (age 56–57); Barcelona, Spain
- Occupations: History Professor, Secretary of History and Archeology

Academic background
- Education: University of Barcelona, University of Girona

Academic work
- Institutions: University of Barcelona
- Main interests: Medieval History & Catalan History
- Notable works: Els remences de la Pia Almoina de la Seu de Girona. Fonts per al seu estudi i estudi preliminar

Rosa Lluch Bramon (born 1969) is a Spanish historian, university professor, and academic secretary of the History and Archeology Department of the University of Barcelona.

== Biography ==
Born in 1969 in Barcelona, she is the daughter of Dolors Bramon and Ernest Lluch.

Bramon held the title interim university degree holder for the department of Medieval History, Paleography and Diplomacy for University of Barcelona in 1960. She graduated to a degree holder in 1992 with her research paper "El es remences de la Pia Almoina de la Seu de Girona". Bramon earned her PhD degree at the University of Girona in 2003 and now works as a professor of history at the University of Barcelona.

Regarding the April 2019 general election, she closed the En Comú Podem congressional list in Barcelona. She is running as Senatorial candidate for Barcelona vis-à-vis the November 2019 general election.

== Works ==
- — (2005). Els remences. La senyoria de l'Almoina de Girona als segles XIV i XV. Girona: Associació d’Història Rural de les Comarques Gironines, Centre de Recerca d’Història Rural de la Universitat de Girona & Documenta Universitaria.
