= Loukas Louka (shot putter) =

Cypriot shot putter (born 1945)

Personal information
- Born: 15 May 1945 Arnadhi, Cyprus
- Died: 20 December 2009 (aged 64)

Sport
- Sport: Track and field

Loukas Louka (Greek: Λουκάς Λουκά, 15 May 1945 – 20 December 2009) was a Greek Cypriot shot putter. He was born in Arnadhi.

He represented Greece at the 1972 Olympic Games, where he did not reach the final. He reached the final at the 1981 European Indoor Championships but recorded no valid mark. His personal best throw was 19.84 metres, achieved in April 1975 in Athens.

He later competed for Cyprus. In the summer of 1981 he was the third best shot putter in the season's list for the entire British Commonwealth. He became visiting Greek shot put champion in 1983.
