= Luke the Evangelist =

One of the four traditionally ascribed authors of the canonical gospels

Saint Luke the Evangelist
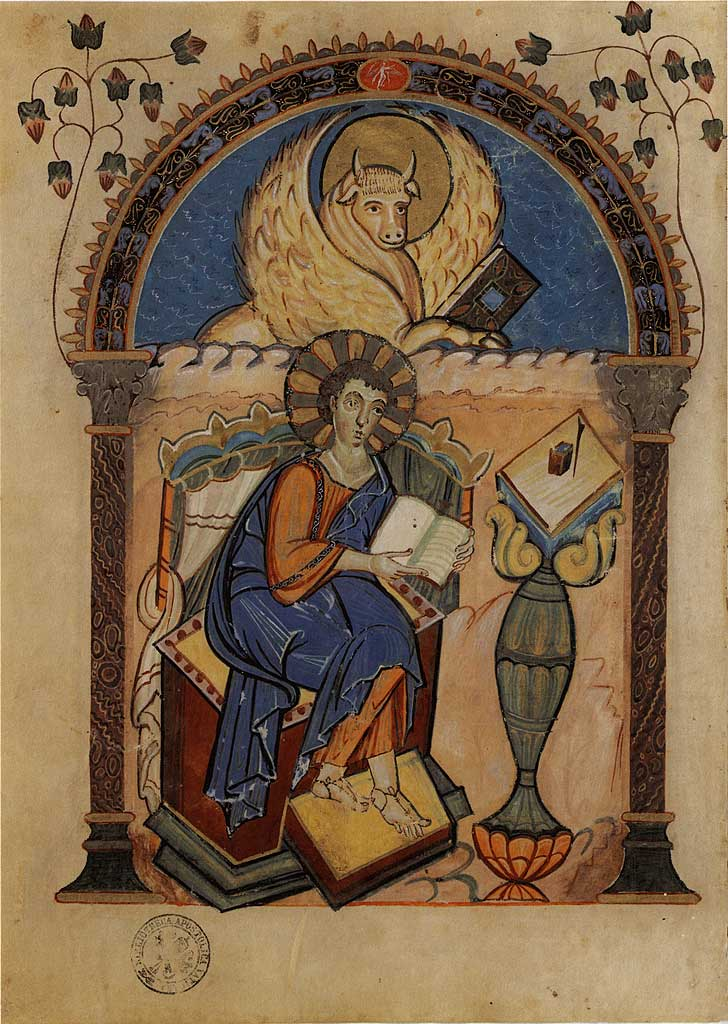
- A Folio of Saint Luke, from the Lorsch Gospels depicting him with the traditional attribute of an angelic Ox behind him

Apostle, Evangelist, Martyr, and Doctor
- Born: Between 1 AD and 16 AD; Antioch, Roman Syria
- Died: Between 84 AD and 100 AD (traditionally aged 84); Thebes, Achaea, Roman Empire
- Venerated in: All Christian denominations that venerate saints, and in the Druze faith
- Major shrine: Padua, Italy
- Feast: 18 October; 31 October (Gregorian when Julian date is observed)
- Attributes: Evangelist, Medical Doctor, Health professional, man with a book or a pen, accompanied by a winged ox or calf, painting an icon of the Blessed Virgin Mary, a brush or a palette
- Patronage: Artists, notaries, bachelors, physicians, goldsmiths, butchers, brewers, glass workers, and others
- Major works: Gospel of Luke, Acts of the Apostles

Luke of Antioch
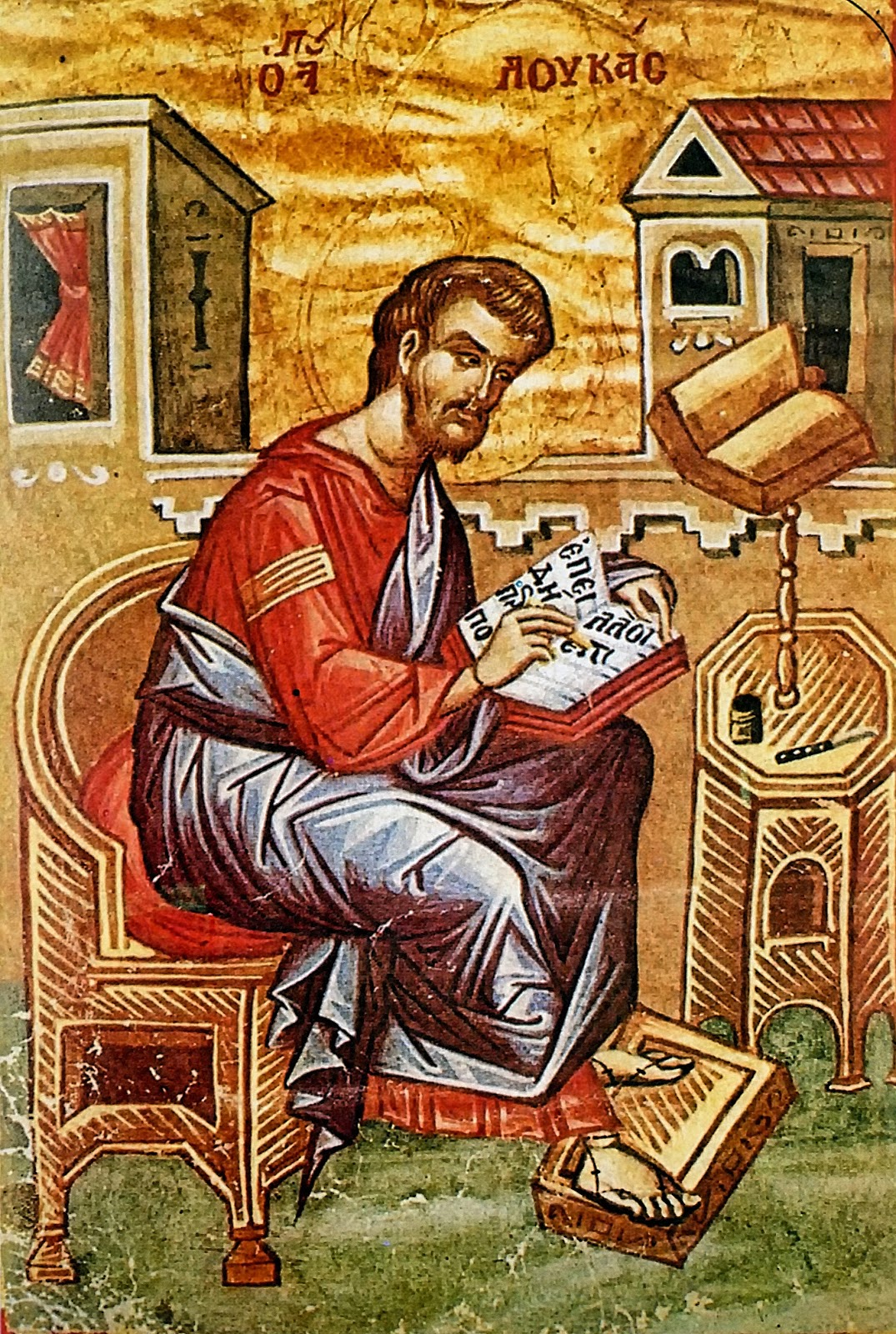
- Occupations: Christian missionary, Historian and Physician
- Writing career
- Language: Koine Greek
- Notable works: Gospel of Luke and Acts of the Apostles

Luke the Evangelist (Note: Latin: Lucas; Ancient Greek: Λουκᾶς, romanized: Loukâs; Hebrew: לוקאס, romanized: Lūqās; Imperial Aramaic: ܠܘܩܐ/לוקא, romanized: Lūqā'; Ge'ez: ሉቃስ) was one of the Four Evangelists—the four traditionally ascribed authors of the canonical gospels. The Early Church Fathers ascribed to him authorship of both the Gospel of Luke and the Acts of the Apostles. Prominent figures in early Christianity such as Jerome and Eusebius later reaffirmed his authorship. Scholarly opinion on the tradition is roughly evenly divided near the end of the 20th century.

The New Testament mentions Luke briefly a few times, and the Epistle to the Colossians refers to him as a physician (from Greek for 'one who heals'); thus he is thought to have been both a physician and a disciple of Paul.

Since the early years of the faith, Christians have regarded him as a saint. He is believed to have been a martyr, reportedly having been hanged from an olive tree, though some believe otherwise. (Note: Aherne 1910 notes that it is controversial whether he actually died a martyr's death) The Eastern Orthodox Church, the Roman Catholic church and other major denominations venerate him as Saint Luke the Evangelist and as a patron saint of artists, physicians, bachelors, notaries, butchers, brewers, and others; his feast day is 18 October. He is also described in the New Testament as a Doctor.

== Life ==
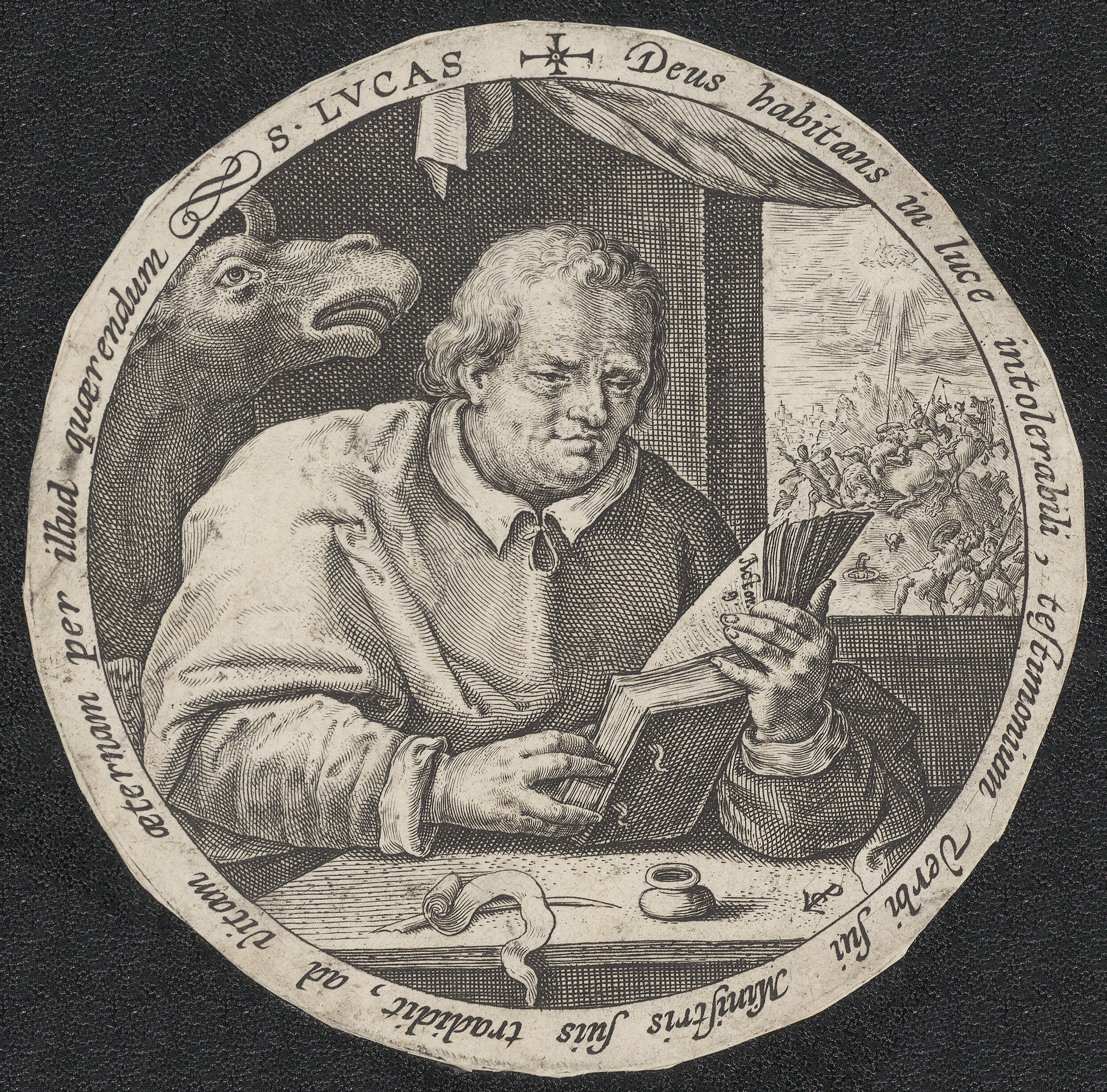
Print of Luke the Evangelist

Many scholars believe that Luke was a physician who lived in the Hellenistic city of Antioch in Ancient Syria, (Note: Luke, was born in Antioch, by profession was a physician.Hackett 1858, p. 12 He had become a disciple of the apostle Paul and later followed Paul until his [Paul's] martyrdom. He died at the age of 84 years.Hackett 1858, p. 335) born of a Greek family, although some scholars and theologians think Luke was a Hellenic Jew. While it has been widely accepted that the theology of Luke–Acts points to a gentile Christian writing for a gentile audience, some have concluded that it is more plausible that Luke–Acts is directed to a community made up of both Jewish and gentile Christians since there is stress on the scriptural roots of the gentile mission (see the use of Isaiah 49:6 in Luke–Acts).

Whether Luke was Jewish or gentile, or something in between, it is clear from the quality of the Greek language used in Luke–Acts that the author, held in Christian tradition to be Luke, was one of the most highly educated of the authors of the New Testament. The author's conscious and intentional allusions and references to, and quotations of, ancient Classical and Hellenistic Greek authors, such as Homer, Aesop, Epimenides, Euripides, Plato, Thucydides, and Aratus indicate that he was familiar with Greek literary texts. This familiarity most likely derived from his experiences as a youth of the very homogenous Hellenistic educational curriculum (ἐγκύκλιος παιδεία, enkyklios paideia) that had been, and would continue to be, used for centuries throughout the eastern Mediterranean.

Luke's earliest mention is in the Epistle to Philemon, chapter 1, verse 24. He is also mentioned in Colossians 4:14 and 2 Timothy 4:11, both however viewed as deutero-Pauline epistles (see Authorship of the Pauline epistles).

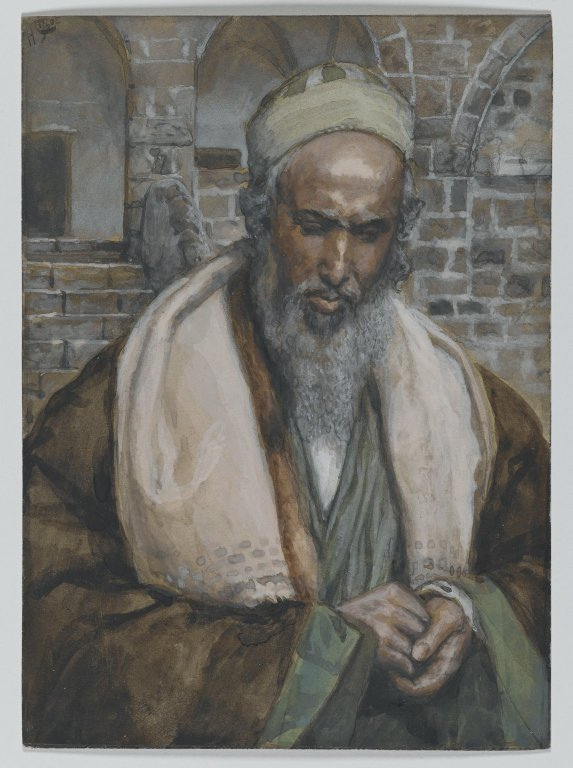
James Tissot, Saint Luke, Brooklyn Museum

Epiphanius states that Luke was one of the Seventy Apostles (Panarion 51.11), and John Chrysostom indicates at one point that the "brother" that Paul mentions in the Second Epistle to the Corinthians 8:18 is either Luke or Barnabas (Homily 18 on Second Corinthians on 2 Corinthians 8:18).

If one accepts that Luke was indeed the author of the Gospel bearing his name and the Acts of the Apostles, certain details of his personal life can be reasonably assumed. While he does exclude himself from those who were eyewitnesses to Jesus' ministry, he repeatedly uses the word we in describing the Pauline missions in Acts of the Apostles, indicating that he was personally there at those times. According to these inferences, the author meets up with the Apostle Paul in Troas (Acts 16:10) to cross to Macedonia and is left for some time in Philippi, then around 52AD rejoins Paul in Philippi (Acts 20:6) on their return to Syria and Jerusalem, and stays by his side on the perilous third missionary journey to Italy (Acts 27:1).

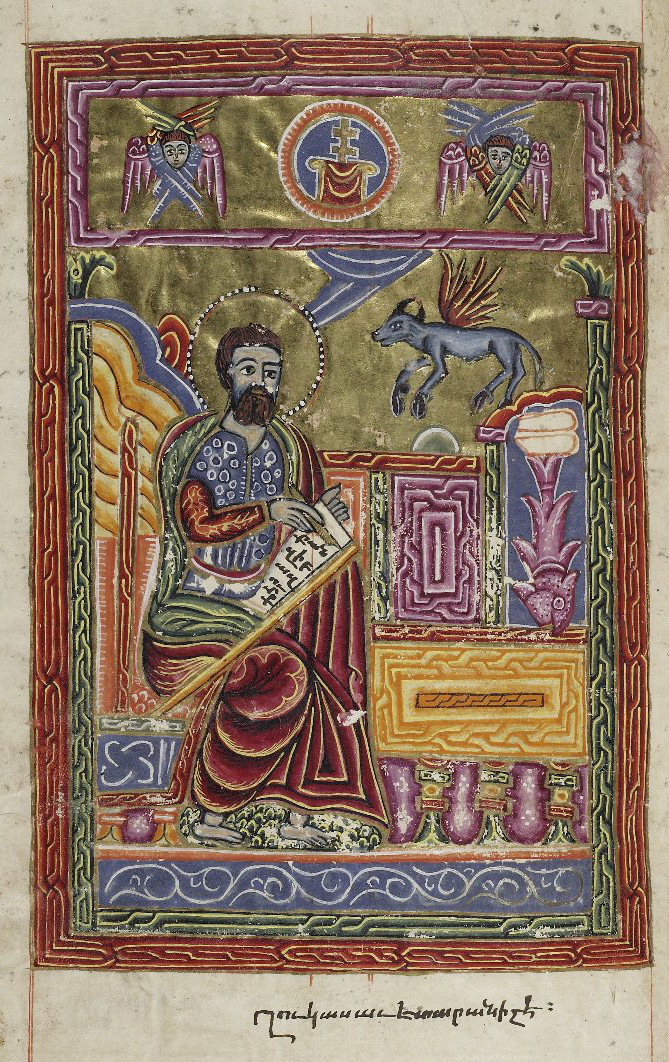
Saint Luke as depicted in the head-piece of an Armenian Gospel manuscript from 1609, held at the Bodleian Library

The composition of the writings, as well as the range of vocabulary used, indicate that the author was an educated man. A quote in the Epistle to the Colossians differentiates between Luke and other colleagues "of the circumcision".

^{10}My fellow prisoner Aristarchus sends you his greetings, as does Mark, the cousin of Barnabas. ^{11}Jesus, who is called Justus, also sends greetings. These are the only Jews among my co-workers for the kingdom of God, and they have proved a comfort to me. [...] ^{14}Our dear friend Luke, the doctor, and Demas send greetings.

— Colossians 4:10–11, 14

This comment has traditionally caused commentators to conclude that Luke was a gentile. If this were true, it would make Luke the only writer of the New Testament who can clearly be identified as not being Jewish. However, that is not the only possibility. Although Luke is considered likely to have been a gentile Christian, some scholars believe him to have been a Hellenized Jew. The phrase could just as easily be used to differentiate between those Christians who strictly observed the rituals of Judaism and those who did not.

Luke's presence in Rome with the Apostle Paul near the end of Paul's life was attested by 2 Timothy 4:11: "Only Luke is with me". In the last chapter of the Book of Acts, widely attributed to Luke, there are several accounts in the first person also affirming Luke's presence in Rome, including Acts 28:16: "And when we came to Rome..." According to some accounts, Luke also contributed to the authorship of the Epistle to the Hebrews.

Luke died at age 84 in Boeotia, according to a "fairly early and widespread tradition" cited in Butler 1991, but Butler does not provide any specific source. According to Nikephoros Kallistos Xanthopoulos, Greek historian of the 14th century (and others), Luke's tomb was located in Thebes, whence his relics were transferred to Constantinople in the year 357.

== Authorship of Luke and Acts ==
Critical opinion on the traditional attribution to Luke the Physician was assessed to be roughly evenly divided near the end of the 20th century. The Gospel of Luke does not name its author, which is similar to other Greco-Roman bios. The Gospel does not claim to be written by a direct eyewitness, but states dependence on eyewitnesses and information passed down. While Acts beginning in the sixteenth chapter implies that its author was a traveling companion of Paul, Some scholars argue that Acts thus represents a forgery. However, in most translations the author suggests that they have investigated the book's events and notes the name (Theophilus) of that to whom they are writing.

The earliest manuscript of the Gospel (Papyrus 75 = Papyrus Bodmer XIV-XV), dated c. AD 200, ascribes the work to Luke; as did Irenaeus writing c. AD 180, and the Muratorian fragment, a 7th-century Latin manuscript thought to be copied and translated from a Greek manuscript as old as AD 170.

The Gospel of Luke and the Acts of the Apostles make up a two-volume work which scholars call Luke–Acts. Together they account for 27.5% of the New Testament, the largest contribution by a single author.

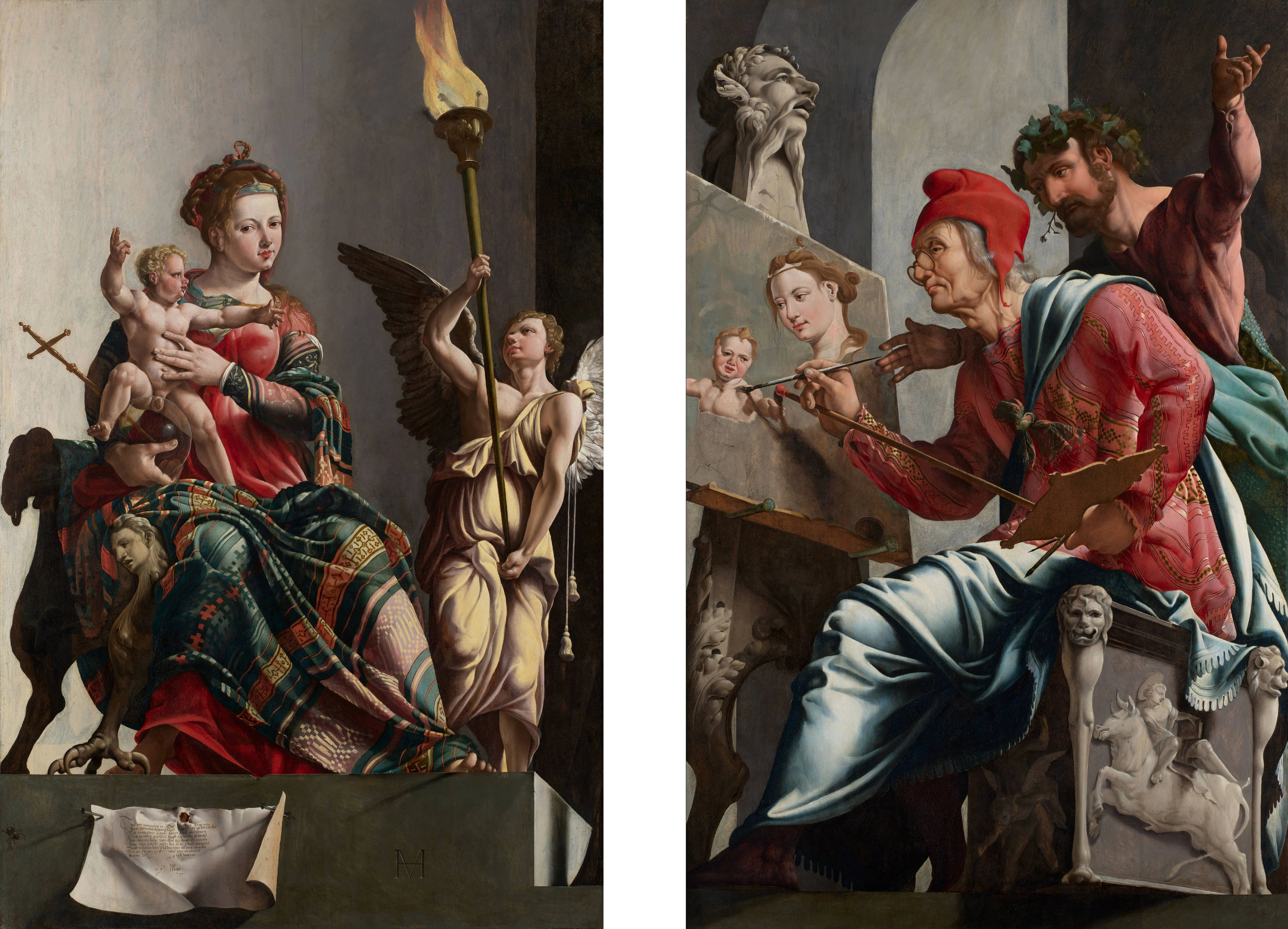
St. Luke painting the Virgin, by Maarten van Heemskerck, 1532

== As a historian ==
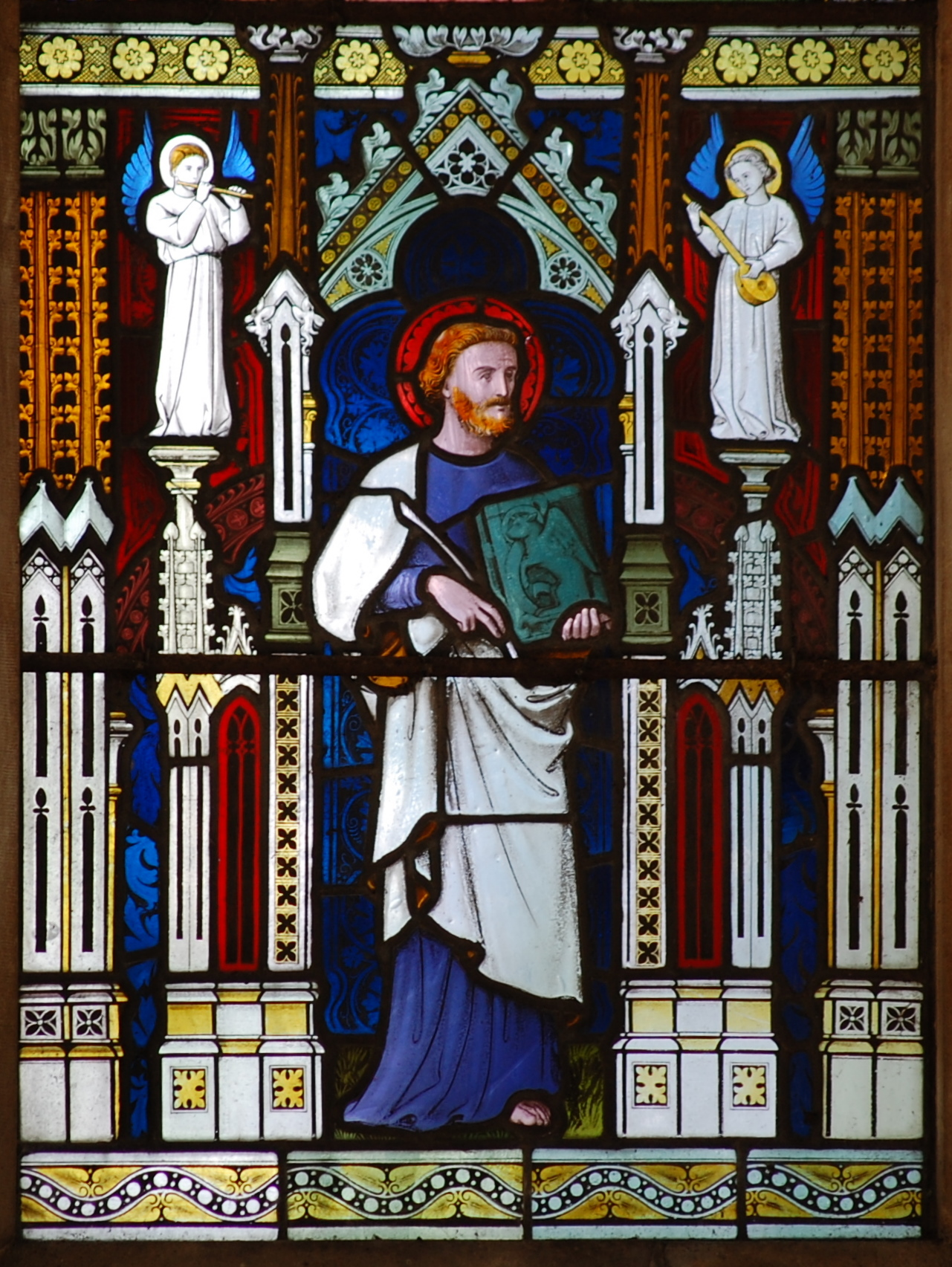
Detail from a window in the parish church of SS Mary and Lambert, Stonham Aspal, Suffolk, with stained glass representing St Luke the Evangelist

Most scholars understand Luke's works (Luke–Acts) in the tradition of Greek historiography. Most scholars believe that Luke intended his works to convey history. Luke 1:1–4, drawing on historical investigation, identified the work to the readers as belonging to the genre of history. There is disagreement about how best to treat Luke's writings, with some historians regarding Luke as highly accurate, and others taking a more critical approach. (Note: McGrew's conclusion: historians work with methodological naturalism, which precludes them from establishing miracles as objective historical facts;Flew 1966, p. 146 cf. Bradley 1874, p. 44.)

Based on his accurate description of towns, cities and islands, as well as correctly naming various official titles, archaeologist William Mitchell Ramsay wrote that "Luke is a historian of the first rank; not merely are his statements of fact trustworthy. ...[He] should be placed along with the very greatest of historians." Professor of Classics at Auckland University, Edward Musgrave Blaiklock, wrote: "For accuracy of detail, and for evocation of atmosphere, Luke stands, in fact, with Thucydides. The Acts of the Apostles is not shoddy product of pious imagining, but a trustworthy record. ...It was the spadework of archaeology which first revealed the truth." New Testament scholar Colin Hemer has made a number of advancements in understanding the historical nature and accuracy of Luke's writings.

On the purpose of Acts, New Testament scholar Luke Timothy Johnson has noted that "Luke's account is selected and shaped to suit his apologetic interests, not in defiance of but in conformity to ancient standards of historiography." Such a position is shared by Richard Heard, who sees historical deficiencies as arising from "special objects in writing and to the limitations of his sources of information."

In modern times, Luke's competence as a historian is questioned, depending upon one's a priori view of the supernatural. Since post-Enlightenment historians work with methodological naturalism, (Note: Historians can only establish what probably happened in the past, and by definition a miracle is the least probable occurrence. And so, by the very nature of the canons of historical research, we can't claim historically that a miracle probably happened. By definition, it probably didn't. And history can only establish what probably did.Craig & Ehrman 2006) such historians would see a narrative that relates supernatural, fantastic things like angels, demons etc., as problematic as a historical source. Mark Powell claims that "it is doubtful whether the writing of history was ever Luke's intent. Luke wrote to proclaim, to persuade, and to interpret; he did not write to preserve records for posterity. An awareness of this, has been, for many, the final nail in Luke the historian's coffin."

Robert M. Grant has noted that although Luke saw himself within the historical tradition, his work contains a number of statistical improbabilities, such as the sizable crowd addressed by Peter in Acts 4:4. He has also noted chronological difficulties whereby Luke "has Gamaliel refer to Theudas and Judas in the wrong order, and Theudas actually rebelled about a decade after Gamaliel spoke (5:36–7)", though this report's status as a chronological difficulty is hotly disputed.

Brent Landau writes:

So how do we account for a Gospel that is believable about minor events but implausible about a major one? One possible explanation is that Luke believed that Jesus' birth was of such importance for the entire world that he dramatically juxtaposed this event against an (imagined) act of worldwide domination by a Roman emperor who was himself called "savior" and "son of God"—but who was nothing of the sort. For an ancient historian following in the footsteps of Thucydides, such a procedure would have been perfectly acceptable.

Since Luke incorporated multiple conventions used by ancient secular historians of the time (had historiographical qualifications, methodology, use of sources, attempted objectivity, literary ability, attempts at accuracy), he is considered a Hellenistic historian.

== As an artist ==
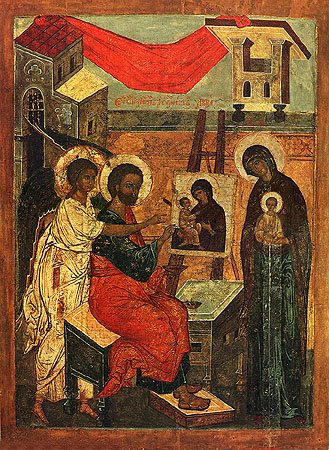
Luke the Evangelist painting the first icon of the Virgin Mary

Christian tradition, starting from the 8th century, states that Luke was the first icon painter. He is said to have painted pictures of the Virgin Mary and Child, in particular the Hodegetria image in Constantinople (now lost). Starting from the 11th century, a number of painted images were venerated as his autograph works, including the Black Madonna of Częstochowa, Our Lady of Vladimir, and Madonna del Rosario. He was also said to have painted Saints Peter and Paul, and to have illustrated a gospel book with a full cycle of miniatures. (Note: The basic study on the legends concerning Saint Luke as a painter is Bacci 1998)

The late medieval Guilds of Saint Luke gathered together and protected painters in many cities of Europe, for instance in Flanders. The Academy of Saint Luke, in Rome, was imitated in many other European cities during the 16th century. The tradition that Luke painted icons of Mary and Jesus has been common, particularly in Eastern Orthodoxy. The tradition also has support from the Saint Thomas Christians of India who claim to still have one of the Theotokos icons that Saint Luke painted and which Saint Thomas brought to India. (Note: Father H. Hosten in his book Antiquities notes the following "The picture at the mount is one of the oldest, and, therefore, one of the most venerable Christian paintings to be had in India. Other traditions hold that St. Luke painted two icons which currently are in Greece: the "Theotokos Mega Spileotissa" (Our Lady of the Great Cave, where supposedly Saint Luke lived for a period of time in asceticism) and the "Panagia Soumela", and "Panagia Kykkou" which are in Cyprus.")

The art critic A. I. Uspensky writes that the icons attributed to the brush of the Evangelist Luke have a completely Byzantine character that was fully established only in the 5th-6th centuries.

== Symbol ==
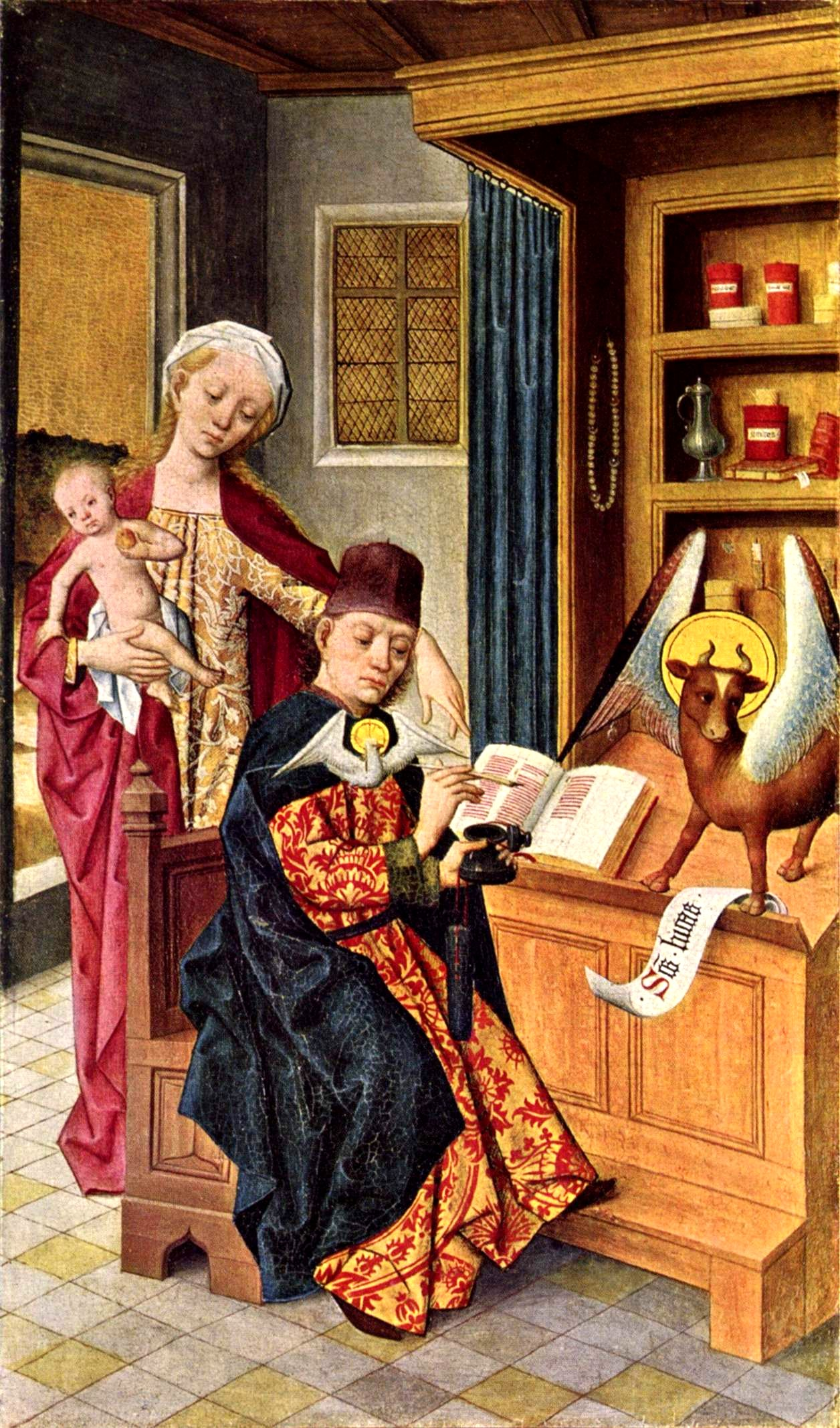
Winged altar of the Guild of Saint Luke, by Hermen Rode, Lübeck (1484)

In traditional depictions, such as paintings, evangelist portraits, and church mosaics, Saint Luke is often accompanied by an ox or bull, usually having wings. The ox is mentioned in both Ezekiel 1:10 and Revelation 4:7. Sometimes only the symbol is shown, especially when in a combination of those of all Four Evangelists. "St Luke is suggested by the ox, a sacrificial animal, because his Gospel stresses the sacrificial nature of Christ's ministry and opens with Zechariah performing his priestly duties."

== Veneration ==
=== Eastern Orthodoxy ===
The Eastern Orthodox Church commemorated Saint Luke, Apostle of the Seventy, Evangelist, companion (coworker) of the holy Apostle Paul, hieromartyr, physician, first icon painter with several feast days. The following are fixed feast days:

- 4 January - The Synaxis of the Seventy Apostles.
- 22 April - Feast of Apostles Nathaniel (Nathanael), Luke the Evangelist, Clement of Sardice or Clement of Rome and Apelles of Heraklion (Greek sources say that Saint Luke (Loukias) was someone other than the Evangelist Luke). This feast is held also on 10 September.
- 20 June - Translation of the relics and garments of the Apostles Luke, Andrew, and Thomas, the Prophet Eliseus, and Martyr Lazarus of Persia found c. 960, during the time of the emperor Romanos Lakapenos (919–44) in a monastery of Saint Augusta into the Church of the Holy Apostles in Constantinople under Emperor Constantine Porphyrogenitus (c. 956–70) by Saint Patriarch Polyeuctus of Constantinople (956–70).
- 10 September - Feast of Apostles of the Seventy: Nathaniel (Nathanael), Luke the Evangelist, Clement of Sardice or Clement of Rome and Apelles of Heraklion (Greek sources say that Saint Luke (Loukias) was someone other than the Evangelist Luke). The commemoration is held again on 22 April.
- 18 October - Feast of the Apostle and Evangelist Luke (Gregorian calendar)
- 31 October - Feast of the Holy Apostle and Evangelist Luke (Julian calendar)

There are also moveable feasts in which Luke is commemorated:

- Synaxis of All Saints of Achaia - Moveable holiday the Sunday before the feast of Saint Andrew (30 November).
- Synaxis of All Saints of Boeotia - Moveable holiday on the last Saturday of May.

=== Roman Catholicism ===
The Roman Catholic Church commemorates Luke the Evangelist on 18 October.

=== Oriental Orthodoxy ===
The Coptic Orthodox Church commemorates the martyrdom of Luke on Paopi 22.

=== Anglicanism ===
The Church of England commemorates Luke the Evangelist on 18 October.

== Relics ==
Despot George of Serbia purportedly bought the relics from the Ottoman sultan Murad II for 30,000 gold coins. After the Ottoman conquest of Bosnia, the kingdom's last queen, George's granddaughter Mary, who had brought the relics with her from Serbia as her dowry, sold them to the Venetian Republic.

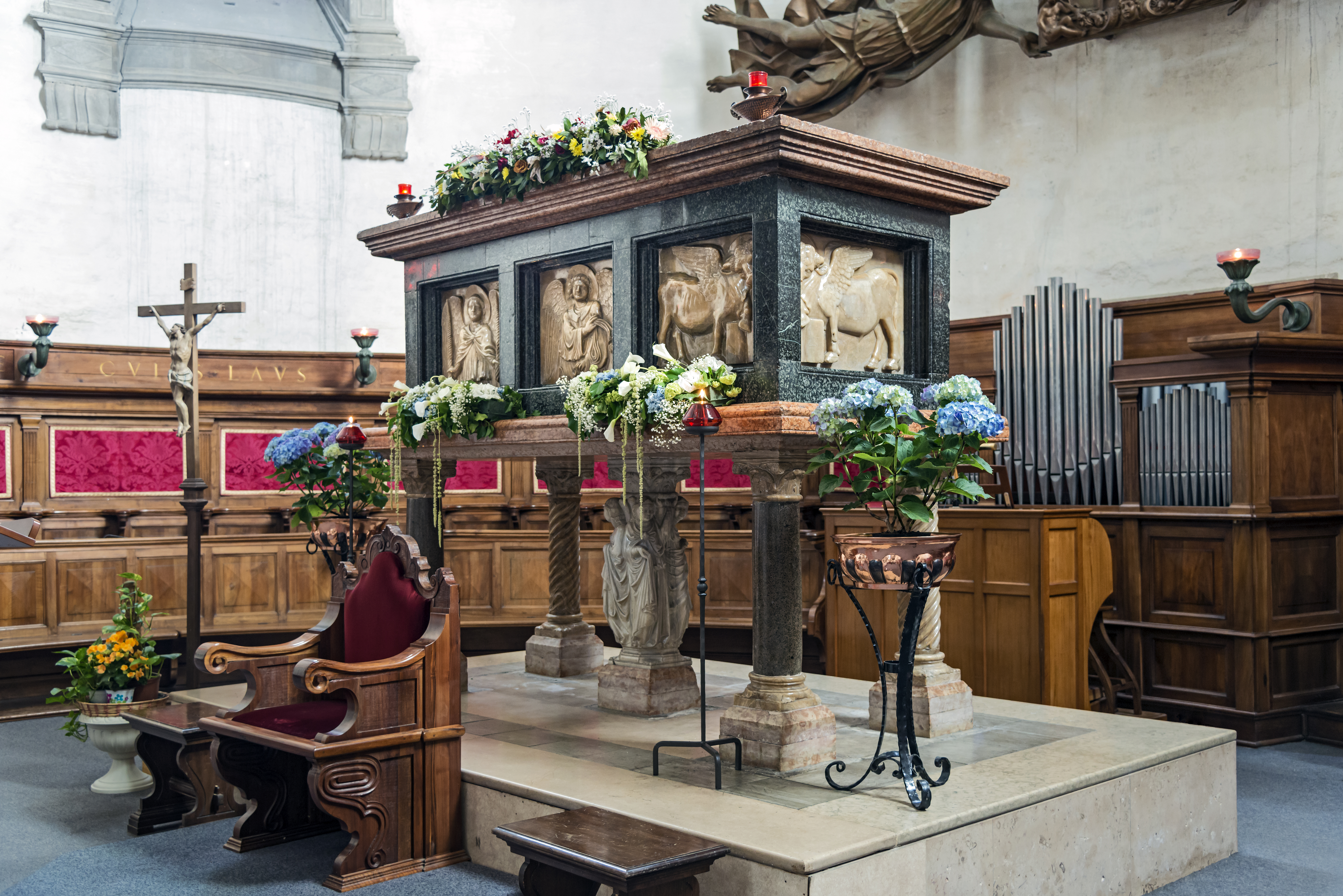
Reliquary of St. Luke the Evangelist in Padua

In 1992, the then Greek Orthodox Metropolitan Ieronymos of Thebes and Livadeia (who subsequently became Archbishop Ieronymos II of Athens and All Greece) requested from Bishop Antonio Mattiazzo of Padua the return of "a significant fragment of the relics of St. Luke to be placed on the site where the holy tomb of the Evangelist is located and venerated today". This prompted a scientific investigation of the relics in Padua, and by numerous lines of empirical evidence (archeological analyses of the Tomb in Thebes and the Reliquary of Padua, anatomical analyses of the remains, carbon-14 dating, comparison with the purported skull of the Evangelist located in Prague) confirmed that these were the remains of an individual of Syrian descent who died between AD 72 and AD 416. The Bishop of Padua then delivered to Metropolitan Ieronymos the rib of Saint Luke that was closest to his heart to be kept at his tomb in Thebes.

Thus, the relics of Saint Luke are divided as follows:

- The body, in the Abbey of Santa Giustina in Padua;
- The skull, in the St. Vitus Cathedral in Prague;
- A rib, at his tomb at the Holy Church of Luke the Evangelist in Thebes.

We also collected and typed modern samples from Syria and Greece. By comparison with these population samples, and with samples from Anatolia that were already available in the literature, we could reject the hypothesis that the body belonged to a Greek, rather than a Syrian, individual. However, the probability of an origin in the area of modern Turkey was only insignificantly lower than the probability of a Syrian origin. The genetic evidence is therefore compatible with the possibility that the body comes from Syria, but also with its replacement in Constantinople.

— Genetic characterization of the body attributed to the evangelist Luke

While there is a large margin of error, that man probably lived in 300 AD.

== Gallery ==
Luke the Evangelist in art

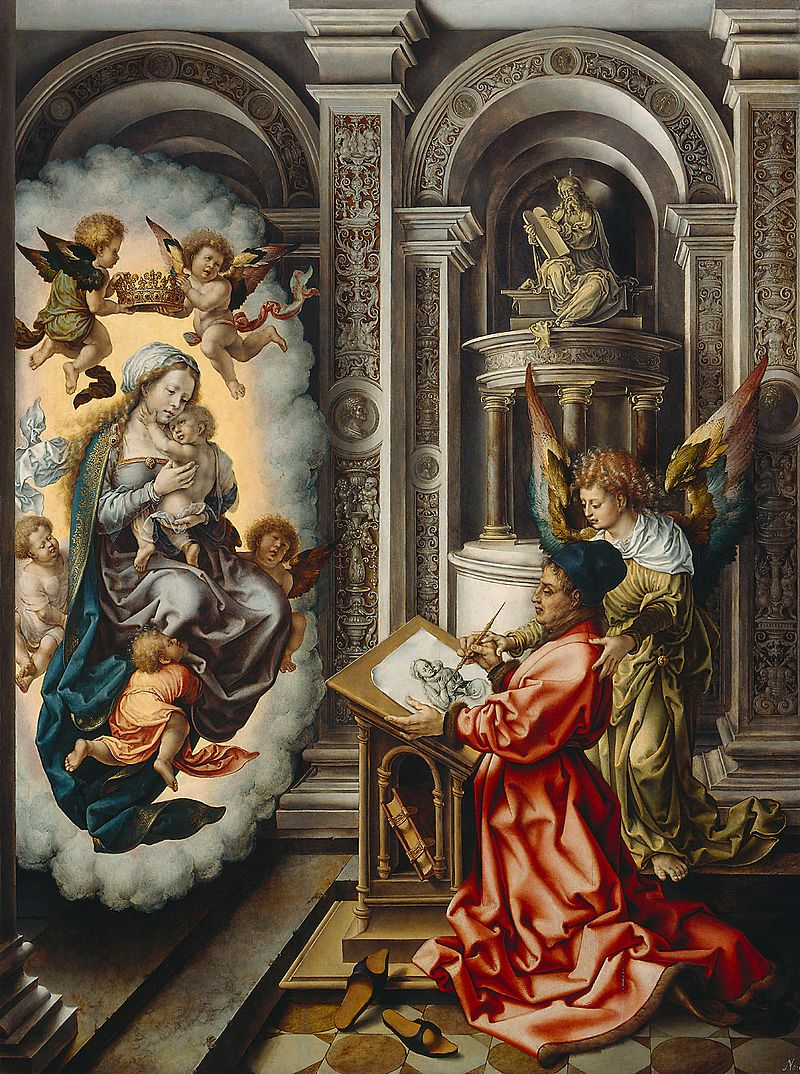

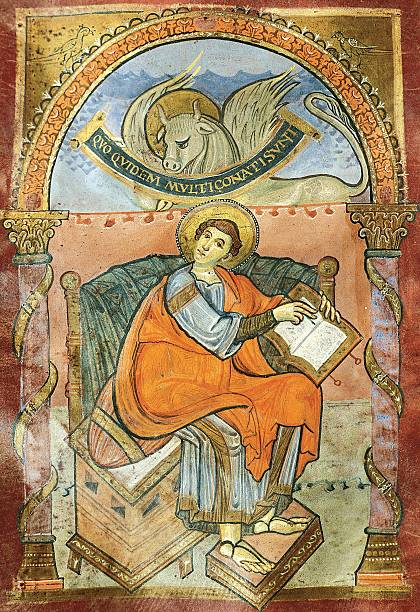

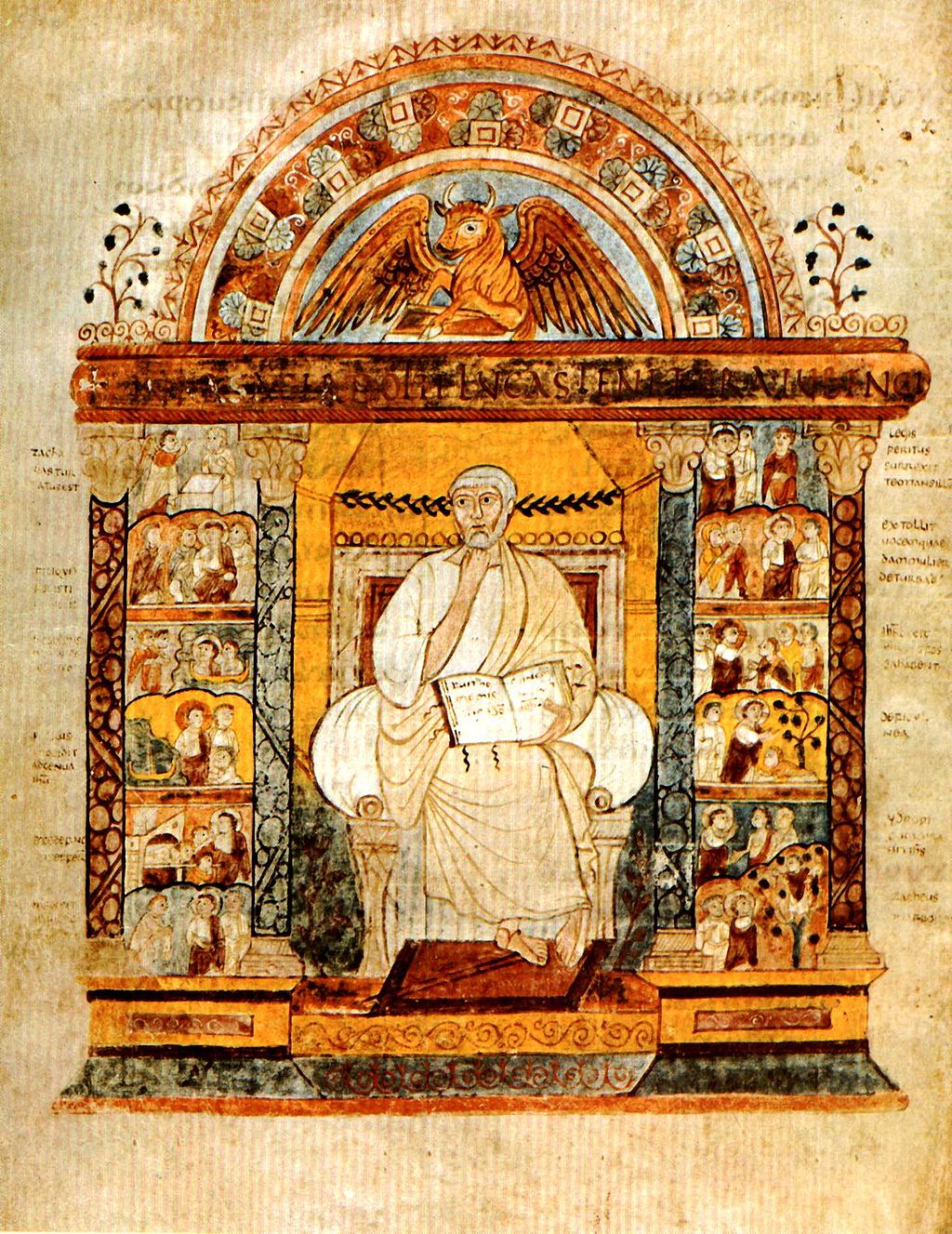

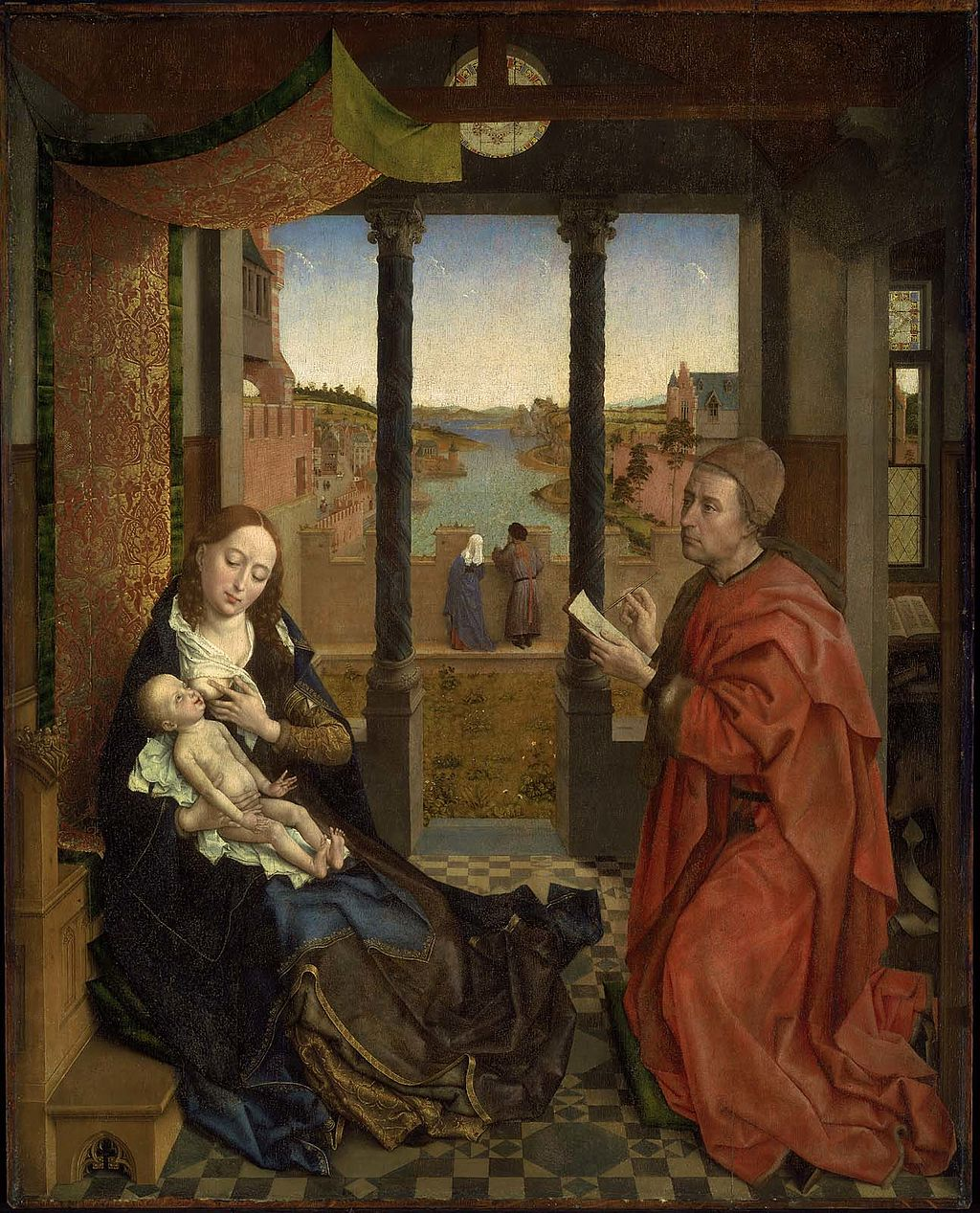

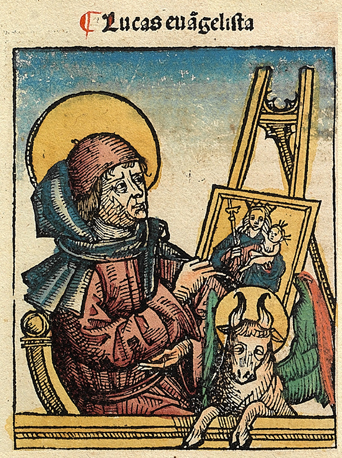

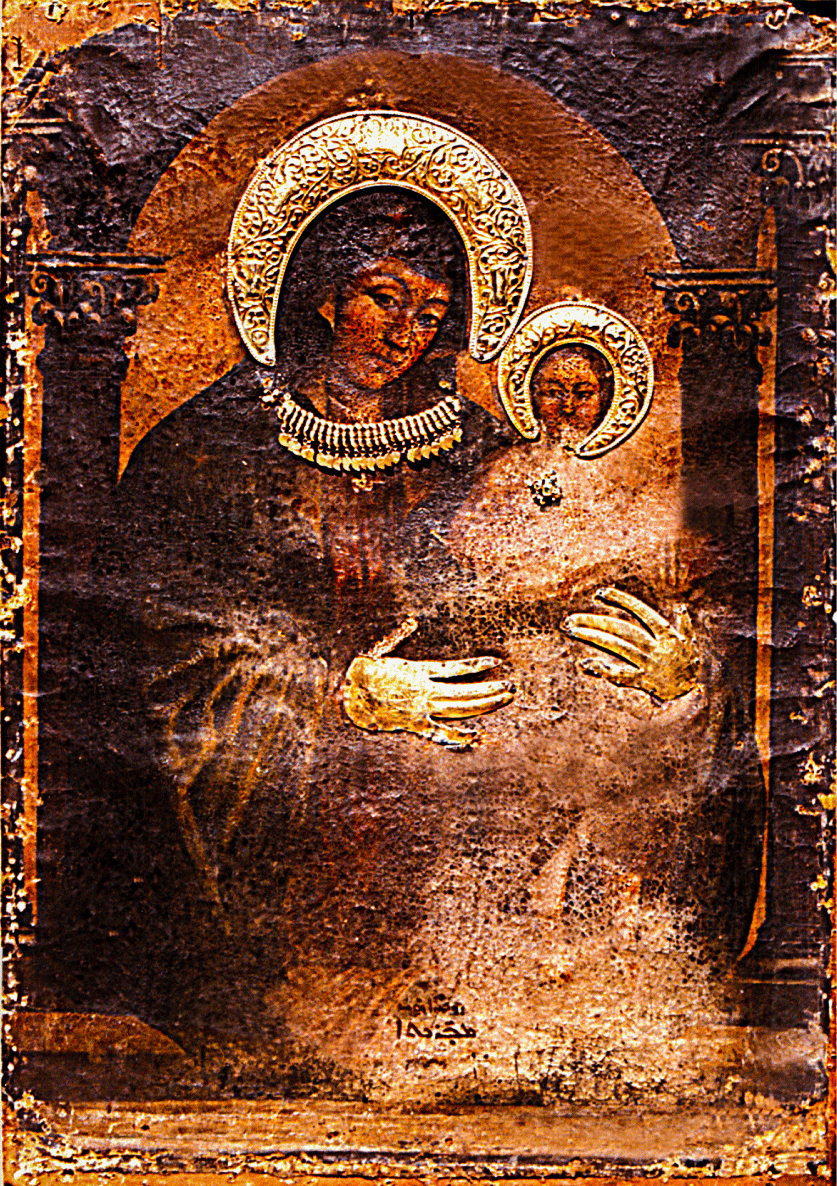

== See also ==
- Historic recurrence
- John the Evangelist
- Mark the Evangelist
- Matthew the Evangelist
