= Lucas Silva (footballer, born 1985) =

Brazilian footballer

Personal information
- Full name: Lucas Borges da Silva
- Date of birth: 27 August 1985 (age 41)
- Place of birth: Brazil
- Position: Defensive midfielder

Team information
- Current team: Jataiense

Senior career*
Years	Team	Apps	(Gls)
2005–2007	Juventude (MT)	0	(0)
2007	Imbituba	0	(0)
2008	Gama	3	(0)
2009	Jataiense	0	(0)
2010	Mixto	0	(0)
2010	Capital	0	(0)
2011	Ceilandense	0	(0)
2011	Santa Helena	0	(0)
2011	Jataiense	0	(0)
- * Club domestic league appearances and goals

Lucas Borges da Silva (born 27 August 1985), known as Lucas Silva or simply Lucas, is a Brazilian footballer who plays for Jataiense.

== Biography ==
Silva started his career at Sociedade Esportiva e Recreativa Juventude, played in 2005 to 2007 Campeonato Mato-Grossense. In July 2007 he was signed by Imbituba for 2007 Divisão de Acesso of Santa Catarina state championship.

In January 2008 he was signed by the Federal District team Gama. However, he was released in August, the mid of 2008 Brazilian second division.

In January 2009 he was signed by Goiás team Jataiense. However, he was released in February. In January 2010 he returned to Mato Grosso for Mixto in 1-year contract. Released in May, He joined Capital Clube de Futebol of Federal District second division.

In January 2011 he swapped for Ceilandense, located at Ceilândia, the satellite town of Brasília. In March, the mid of the state league, he moved to Santa Helena of Goiás state championship.

In June he was re-signed by Jataiense for Goiás state championship second division.
