= Luca Valussi =

Argentine basketball player

Personal information
- Born: 21 January 1998 (age 28) Resistencia, Argentina
- Listed height: 6 ft 6 in (1.98 m)
- Listed weight: 176 lb (80 kg)

Career information
- Playing career: 2016–present
- Position: SF

Career history
- 2016–2023: Obras Sanitarias
- 2023–2024: CB Alginet
- 2024–present: Club Atlético River Plate

Luca Valussi (born 21 January 1998) is an Argentine professional basketball player for Club Atlético River Plate of La Liga Argentina (LLA), the second division of Argentine basketball.

== Professional career ==
Some of the clubs Valussi played with professionally included: Obras Sanitarias (2016–2023), CB Alginet (2023–24) and Club Atlético River Plate (2024–present). The first and latter in the Argentine League; the remaining in the Spanish League.

== National team career ==
Valussi defended Argentina U17 at the 2015 FIBA South America Under-17 Championship. With the Argentina U19 team, He played at the 2017 FIBA Under-19 Basketball World Cup.
