= Lucas Schaal =

German politician (born 1990)

- Schaal in 2026

Member of the Abgeordnetenhaus of Berlin
- Incumbent
- Assumed office 2023

Personal details
- Born: 1990 (age 35–36) Germany
- Party: Christian Democratic Union
- Education: University of Mannheim; Humboldt University of Berlin

Lucas Schaal (born 1990) is a German politician from the Christian Democratic Union of Germany (CDU) and has been a member of the Abgeordnetenhaus of Berlin since 2023.

== Biography ==
Schaal graduated from the Bischöfliches Cusanus-Gymnasium in Koblenz in 2009. He studied economics at the University of Mannheim until 2012 and subsequently law at Humboldt University of Berlin from 2013, completing his first state examination in 2018. From 2019 to 2021, he completed his legal traineeship at the Brandenburg Higher Regional Court.

From 2012 to 2016, Schaal was a research assistant in the German Bundestag, from 2019 to 2020 a research assistant in an international law firm, and from 2022 to March 2023 personal advisor to Friedrich Merz as chairman of the CDU/CSU parliamentary group in the German Bundestag.

== Political career ==
Schaal was elected to the board of the CDU local branch Brandenburg Gate in 2016. Since 2017, he has been chairman of the Young Union Berlin-Mitte. In 2019, he became a member of the CDU Berlin state board. He is also an assessor on the board of the SME and Economic Union in Berlin-Mitte.

After being unsuccessful in the 2021 Berlin state election, Schaal won the direct mandate in the Mitte 2 constituency in the 2023 repeat election with 24.9% of the first-preference votes. He thus succeeded Max Landero.

== Positions ==
Regarding Berlin's transport senator Bettina Jarasch's plans to close Friedrichstraße to car traffic, Schaal said: "This feels like a bad joke. They talk about a piazza and then they just put plywood furniture in the street. There's no overall concept at all."
