= Lucas Polese =

Brazilian politician (born 1996)

- Polese in 2026

Member of the Chamber of Deputies
- Assuming office 1 February 2027
- Constituency: Espírito Santo

Member of the Legislative Assembly of Espírito Santo
- Incumbent
- Assumed office 1 February 2023
- Constituency: At-large

Personal details
- Born: Lucas da Re Polese; 24 October 1996 (age 30) Colatina, Espírito Santo, Brazil
- Party: PL (since 2022)

Lucas Da Re Polese (born 24 October 1996) is a Brazilian politician serving as a member of the Legislative Assembly of Espírito Santo since 2023. He is the youngest current member of the Assembly.
