= Lukáš =

Lukáš (pronounced [ˈlukaːʃ]) is a Czech and Slovak given name and surname, a cognate of the given name Luke. Diminutives of the given name include Lukášek, Lukínek, Lukíšek. Some of them can be surnames. Notable people and characters with the name include:

== Given name ==
- Lukáš Bauer (born 1977), Czech cross-country skier
- Lukáš Černohorský (born 1984), Czech politician
- Lukáš Červ (born 2001), Czech football (soccer) footballer
- Lukáš Haraslín (born 1996), Slovak football (soccer) player
- Lukáš Klíma (curler) (born 1991), Czech curler
- Lukáš Kolářík (born 1984), Czech politician
- Lukáš Krajíček (born 1983), Czech ice hockey player
- Lukáš Kratochvíl (born 2005), Czech slalom canoeist
- Lukáš Krpálek (born 1990), Czech heavyweight judoka
- Lukáš Lacko (born 1987), Slovak tennis player
- Lukáš Latinák (born 1977), Slovak actor
- Lukáš Melich (born 1980), Czech hammer thrower
- Lukáš Dostál (born 2000), Czech ice hockey player
- Lukáš Pešek (born 1985), Czech 250ccm Grand Prix motorbike rider
- Lukáš Pokorný (tennis) (born 2002), Slovak tennis player
- Lukáš Rosol (born 1985), Czech tennis player

== Surname ==
- Zdeněk Lukáš (1928–2007), Czech composer, teacher, music editor, and conductor

== Fictional characters ==
- Oberleutnant Lukáš from The Good Soldier Švejk

== See also ==
- Lukeš
