= Luc (given name) =

Luc is a French masculine given name and occasionally a diminutive form of other names. Notable people with this name include:

- Luc Abalo (born 1984), French handball player
- Luc Alphand (born 1965), French alpine skier
- Luc Arbogast (born 1975), French musician, singer, and songwriter
- Luc Berthold, Canadian politician
- Luc Besson (born 1959), French film director, screenwriter and producer
- Luc Blanchette, Canadian politician
- Luc Bradet (born 1969), Canadian pair skater
- Luc Carvounas (born 1971), French politician
- Luc Castaignos (born 1992), Dutch footballer
- Luc Dardenne (born 1954), Belgian filmmaker
- Luc Donckerwolke (born 1965), Belgian car designer
- Luc Ducalcon (born 1984), French rugby union player
- Luc Ferrari (1929–2005), French composer
- Luc Fortin, Canadian politician
- Luc Gnacadja (born 1958), Beninese politician and architect
- Luc ter Haar (born 1993), Dutch speed skater
- Luc Hoffmann (1923–2016), Swiss ornithologist, conservationist and philanthropist
- Luc Jacquet (born 1967), French film director
- Luc Jochimsen (born 1936), German politician
- Luc Jouret (1947–1994), Belgian homeopath and cult leader
- Luc Longley (born 1969), Australian basketball player
- Luc Louves (born 1989), French basketball player
- Luc Marquet (born 1970), French volleyball player
- Luc Michel (1958–2025), belgian political activist
- Luc Adamo Matéta (born 1949), Congolese politician
- Luc Mbah a Moute (born 1986), Cameroonian basketball player
- Luc Montagnier (1932–2022), French virologist
- Luc Nilis (born 1967), Belgian retired footballer
- Luc Nkulula (1985-2018), Congolese political activist
- Luc Picard (born 1961), French-Canadian actor, director and comedian
- Luc Robichaud, Canadian politician
- Luc Robitaille (born 1966), Canadian ice hockey player and executive
- Luc Sala (1949–2023), Dutch entrepreneur and writer
- Luc Tuymans (born 1958), Belgian painter

== Fictional characters ==
- Luc, in the video game Fields of Mistria
- Luc Deveraux, protagonist of the Universal Soldier film series, played Jean-Claude Van Damme
- Luc Laurent, in the television series Brothers & Sisters
- Luc Mantear, in The Wheel of Time fantasy novel series

== See also ==
- Jean-Luc
