= Luke (given name) =

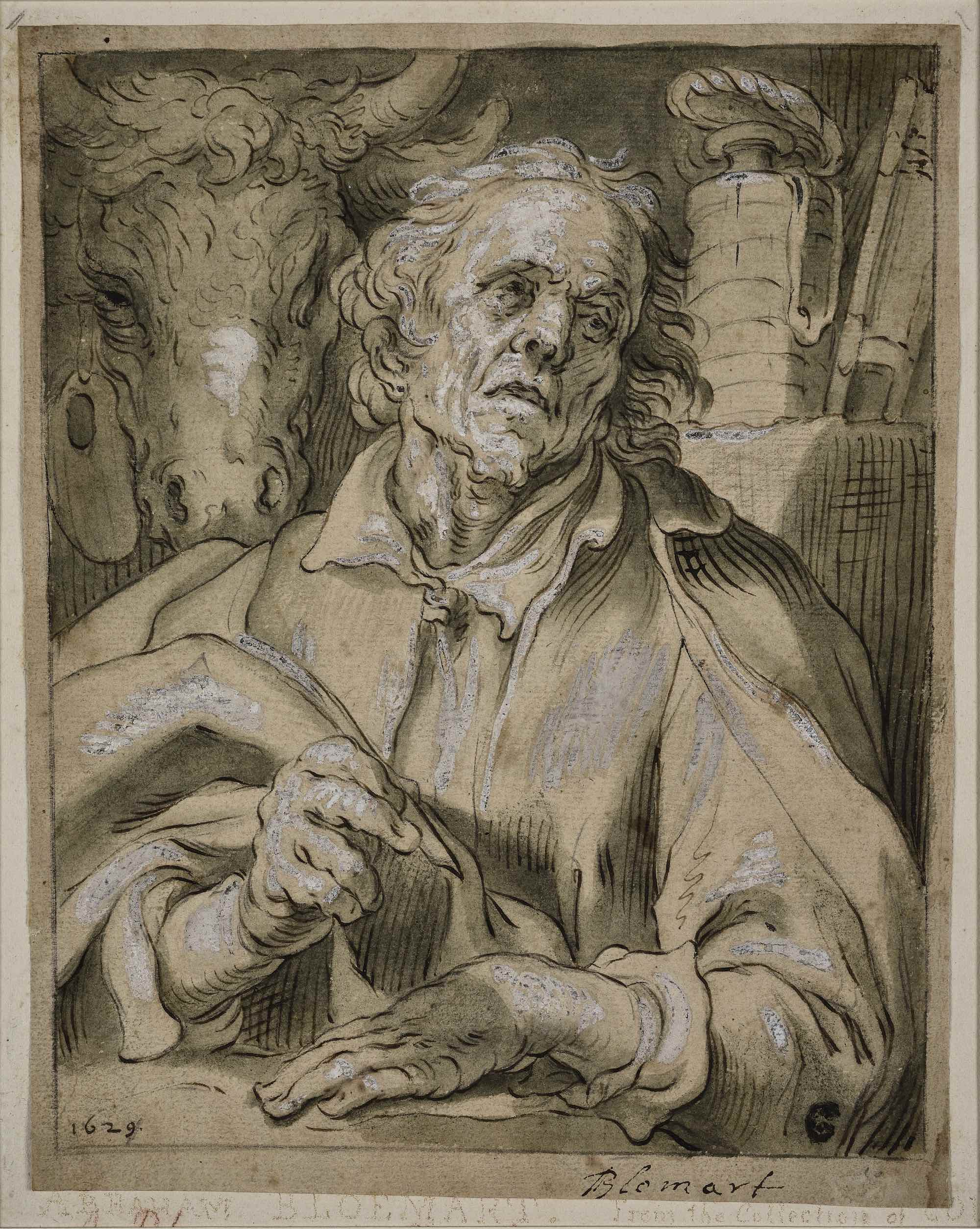
- Image of Luke the Evangelist by Abraham Bloemaert
- Pronunciation: /luːk/
- Gender: Masculine
- Name day: 18 October

Origin
- Origin: Latin
- Meaning: "Light"

Other names
- Related names: Lucius; Luc; Luca; Lucas; Luka; Lukas; Lucy; Lucinda; Lukasz

Luke (/ˈluːk/) is a masculine given name and, less commonly, a surname.

The name Luke is the English form and the diminutive of the Latin name Lucas. The exact etymology of the name is contested. According to Oxford's A Dictionary of First Names, the name comes from Greek Λουκᾶς (Loukas) and means "man from Lucania". The Roman poet Virgil also argued that Latin lucas/luca came from Lucanus, literally meaning "resident of Lucania", which modern etymology agrees with. It could also be derived from the Latin name Lucius and mean "the bright one" or "the one born at dawn." Another proposed etymology is derivation from Etruscan Lauchum (or Lauchme) meaning "king," which was more directly transferred into Latin as Lucumo.

The best-known historical use of the name is in the Gospel of Luke, written around 80 to 90 AD. Luke the Evangelist, who is credited with the authorship of the Gospel of Luke, was a physician who lived around 30 to 130 AD. Luke is also credited with the Book of Acts in the Bible and is mentioned by the Apostle Paul in some of Paul's letters to first-century churches.

== People ==
=== Mononym ===
- Luke the Evangelist (died 84), one of the Four Evangelists
- Uncle Luke (born 1960), American rapper, promoter, and record executive

=== A ===
- Luke Abbott, English electronic musician
- Luke Ablett (born 1982), Australian rules footballer
- Luke Abraham (born 1983), English rugby union footballer
- Luke Adam (born 1990), Canadian ice hockey player
- Luke Adams (disambiguation), multiple people
- Luke Adamson (born 1987), English rugby league footballer
- Luke Aikins (born 1973), American skydiver
- Luke Akehurst (born 1972), British politician
- Luke Alker (born 2006), English footballer
- Luke Allen (1978–2022), American baseball player
- Luke Allen-Gale (born 1984), British actor
- Luke Altmyer (born 2002), American football player
- Luke Ambler (born 1989), Irish rugby league footballer
- Luke Amos (born 1997), English footballer
- Luke Andrews (born 1976), New Zealand rugby union footballer
- Luke Anguhadluq (1895–1982), Canadian artist
- Luke Anowtalik (1932–2006), Native Canadian artist
- Luke Anthony (born 1976), Australian actor
- Luke Appling (1907–1991), American baseball player
- Luke Archer (1899–1988), American baseball player
- Luke Armstrong (born 1996), English footballer
- Luke Arnold (born 1984), Australian actor
- Luke Arscott (born 1984), English rugby union footballer
- Luke Ashworth (born 1989), English footballer
- Luke Askew (1932–2012), American actor
- Luke Ayling (born 1991), English footballer

=== B ===
- Luke Babbitt (born 1989), American basketball player
- Luke Bailey (disambiguation), multiple people
- Luke Bain (born 2000), Scottish rugby league footballer
- Luke Baines (born 1990), English-Australian actor
- Luke Bakhuizen (born 1993), Australian photographer
- Luke Baldauf (born 1969), Virgin Island windsurfer
- Luke Ball (born 1984), Australian rules footballer
- Luke Baldwin (rugby union) (born 1990), English rugby union footballer
- Luke Baldwin (racing driver) (born 2006), American stock car racing driver
- Luke Bambridge (born 1995), British tennis player
- Luke Bard (born 1990), American baseball player
- Luke Barker (born 1992), American baseball player
- Luke Barker (American football) (born 1991), American football coach
- Luke Barnatt (born 1988), English mixed martial artist
- Luke Basso (born 2003), American football player
- Luke Bateman (born 1995), Australian rugby league footballer
- Luke Bateman (trade unionist) (1873–?), British trade unionist
- Luke Bates (1873–1943), British trade unionist
- Luke Bayer (born 1992), English actor
- Luke Beauchamp (born 1992), Australian rugby union footballer
- Luke Beaufort (born 2001), South African cricketer
- Luke Becker (born 1999), American racing driver
- Luke Beckett (born 1976), English footballer
- Luke Bedford (born 1978), British composer
- Luke Francis Beirne (born 1995), Irish-Canadian writer
- Luke Bell (disambiguation), multiple people
- Luke Belton (1918–2006), Irish politician
- Luke Benstead (born 1989), Jerseyian football manager
- Luke Benward (born 1995), American actor
- Luke Berry (born 1992), English footballer
- Luke Beveridge (born 1970), Australian rules footballer
- Luke Bezzina (born 1995), Maltese sprinter
- Luke Biasi (born 1999), American soccer player
- Luke Bilyk (born 1994), Canadian actor
- Luke Bird (born 1986), New Zealand singer
- Luke Black (born 1992), Serbian singer-songwriter
- Luke Blackaby (born 1991), English cricketer
- Luke P. Blackburn (1816–1887), American physician and politician
- Luke Blackwell (born 1986), Australian rules footballer
- Luke Blake, English rugby league footballer
- Luke Blakely (born 1988), English-Antiguan footballer
- Luke Boden (born 1988), English footballer
- Luke Bodensteiner (born 1970), American skier
- Luke Bodnar (born 2000), Australian footballer
- Luke Bolton (born 1999), English footballer
- Luke Bond (born 1980), British organist
- Luke Bonner (born 1985), American basketball player
- Luke Booker (1762–1835), English clergyman
- Luke Booth, British product designer
- Luke Bourgeois (born 1977), Australian tennis player
- Luke Bowanko (born 1991), American football player
- Luke Bowen (born 1986), British race car driver
- Luke Kibet Bowen (born 1983), Kenyan runner
- Luke Boyd (disambiguation), multiple people
- Luke Bracey (born 1989), Australian actor
- Luke Braid (born 1988), New Zealand rugby union footballer
- Luke Branighan (born 1981), Australian rugby league footballer
- Luke Brattan (born 1990), Australian football player
- Luke Brennan (disambiguation), multiple people
- Luke Bretherton, British theologian
- Luke Breust (born 1990), Australian rules footballer
- Luke Briscoe (born 1994), English rugby league footballer
- Luke Broadwater, American journalist
- Luke Bronin (born 1979), American politician
- Luke Brooke-Smith (born 2008), New Zealand footballer
- Luke Brooks (born 1994), Australian rugby league footballer
- Luke Brooks (American soldier) (1731–1817), American soldier
- Luke Brookshier (born 1971), American television writer
- Luke Brown (disambiguation), multiple people
- Luke Browning (born 2002), British racing driver
- Luke Brubacher (born 2000), Canadian football player
- Luke Brugnara (born 1963), American real estate investor
- Luke Bryan (born 1976), American country singer
- Luke Burbank (born 1976), American radio host
- Luke Burgess (disambiguation), multiple people
- Luke Burke (born 1998), English footballer
- Luke F. Burns (1881–1956), American politician
- Luke Burrage (born 1980), British juggler
- Luke Burt (born 1981), Australian rugby league coach
- Luke Burton (born 1994), Australian rugby union footballer
- Luke Burton-Krahn (born 1997), Canadian football player
- Luke Busby (born 1981), English singer-songwriter
- Luke Butkus (born 1979), American football coach
- Luke Butterworth (born 1983), Australian cricketer

=== C ===
- Luke Cain (born 1980), Australian shooter
- Luke Caldwell (born 1991), Scottish runner
- Luke Callan, Australian rugby union footballer
- Luke Campbell (disambiguation), multiple people
- Luke Cann (born 1994), Australian javelin thrower
- Luke Capewell (born 1989), Australian rugby league footballer
- Luke Carlin (born 1980), Canadian-American baseball player
- Luke Carroll (born 1982), Australian actor
- Luke Carter (born 1960), New Zealand sailor
- Luke Carty (born 1997), Irish rugby union footballer
- Luke Casserly (born 1973), Australian footballer
- Luke Caudillo (born 1980), American mixed martial artist
- Luke Chadwick (born 1980), English footballer
- Luke Challoner (1550–1613), Irish academic
- Luke Chambers (born 1985), English footballer
- Luke Chambers (footballer, born 2004), English footballer
- Luke Chan (1896–1983), Chinese-Canadian actor
- Luke Chapman (born 1991), English footballer
- Luke Charlesworth (born 1992), New Zealand badminton player
- Luke Charman (born 1997), English footballer
- Luke Charteris (born 1983), Welsh rugby union footballer
- Luke Charters (born 1995), British politician
- Luke Ching (born 1972), Hong Kong labor activist
- Luke Chrysoberges (died 1169), Patriarch of Constantinople
- Luke Chueh (born 1973), Chinese-American painter
- Luke Cissell, American musician
- Luke Clanton (born 2003), American golfer
- Luke Clark (born 1994), English footballer
- Luke Clausen (born 1978), American fisherman
- Luke Clennell (1781–1840), British painter
- Luke Clippinger (born 1972), American politician and lawyer
- Luke Clough (1878–1956), Australian politician
- Luke Cole (1962–2009), American lawyer
- Luke Cole (rugby union) (born 1993), English rugby union footballer
- Luke Collis (born 1988), American football player
- Luke Combs (born 1990), American singer-songwriter
- Luke Conlan (born 1994), Northern Irish footballer
- Luke Connolly (born 1992), Irish-Gaelic footballer
- Luke Cook (born 1986), Australian actor
- Luke Cooper (born 1994), English rugby league footballer
- Luke Corbett (born 1984), English footballer
- Luke Cornish (born 1979), Australian artist
- Luke Cornwall (born 1980), English footballer
- Luke Coulson (born 1994), English footballer
- Luke Coutinho, Indian entrepreneur, author and lifestyle guru
- Luke Covell (born 1981), New Zealand rugby league footballer
- Luke Cowan-Dickie (born 1993), English rugby union footballer
- Luke F. Cozans (1836–1903), American politician
- Luke Crane (born 1985), Australian rules footballer
- Luke Cresswell (born 1963), English percussionist
- Luke Croll (born 1995), English footballer
- Luke Crosbie (born 1997), Scottish rugby union footballer
- Luke Cudmore (born 1984), Canadian rugby union footballer
- Luke Cummo (born 1980), American mixed martial artist
- Luke Cundle (born 2002), English footballer
- Luke Cuni (1911–1980), Albanian-Australian teacher
- Luke Currie (born 1981), Australian jockey
- Luke Curtin (born 1977), American ice hockey player
- Luke Cutts (born 1988), British pole vaulter

=== D ===
- Luke Dahlhaus (born 1992), Australian rules footballer
- Luke Daly-Groves, English historian
- Luke Daniels (born 1988), English footballer
- Luke Darcy (born 1975), Australian rules footballer
- Luke Davenport (born 1993), British racing driver
- Luke Davids, South African sprinter
- Luke Davies (disambiguation), multiple people
- Luke Davies-Uniacke (born 1999), Australian rules footballer
- Luke Davison (born 1990), Australian cyclist
- Luke Dawai (died 1970), Fijian chief and rugby union international footballer
- Luke Dawson, American screenwriter
- Luke Dean (disambiguation), multiple people
- Luke de Beaulieu (died 1723), English cleric
- Luke Delaney (born 1989), Australian rules footballer
- Luke Delaney (astronaut) (born 1979), American astronaut
- Luke Del Rio (born 1994), American football player and coach
- Luke Demetre (born 1990), Canadian bobsledder
- Luke Dempsey (born 1979/1980), Irish Gaelic football manager
- Luke Dennison (born 1996), American soccer player
- Luke de Pulford (born 1984), English activist
- Luke de Tany (died 1282), English noble
- Luke DeVere (born 1989), Australian footballer
- Luke Digby (born 2001), British figure skater
- Luke Dillon (disambiguation), multiple people
- Luke Dimech (born 1977), Maltese footballer
- Luke Di Somma, New Zealand lyricist
- Luke Dobie (born 1992), English footballer
- Luke Doerner (born 1979), Australian field hockey player
- Luke Doherty (born 1982), Australian rugby union footballer
- Luke Dollman, Australian conductor
- Luke Donald (born 1977), English professional golfer
- Luke Donald (footballer) (born 1971), Australian rules footballer
- Luke Donaldson (born 2000), New Zealand rugby union footballer
- Luke Doneathy (born 2001), English cricketer
- Luke Donnellan (born 1966), Australian politician
- Luke Donnelly (born 1996), Scottish footballer
- Luke Doolan (born 1979), Australian film editor
- Luke Doran (born 1991), Australian cricketer
- Luke Dorman, American graphic designer
- Luke Dorn (born 1982), Australian rugby league footballer
- Luke Doty (born 2001), American football player
- Luke Doucet (born 1973), Canadian singer-songwriter
- Luke Douglas (born 1986), Scottish footballer
- Luke Douglas-Home, British environmentalist
- Luke Dowler (born 1981), American songwriter
- Luke Drone (born 1984), American football player
- Luke Drury (disambiguation), multiple people
- Luke Drzewiecki (born 2003), American football player
- Luke Duffy (1890–1961), Irish trade unionist
- Luke Duffy (rugby league) (born 1980), Australian rugby league footballer
- Luke Dunstan (born 1995), Australian rules footballer
- Luke Durbridge (born 1991), Australian racing cyclist
- Luke Duzel (born 2002), Australian footballer
- Luke Dwyer (born 1977/1978), Australian rules football coach
- Luke Dyer (born 1981), Australian rugby league footballer

=== E ===
- Luke Easter (disambiguation), multiple people
- Luke Ebbin, American record producer
- Luke Edmunds, Australian politician
- Luke Edwards (born 2002), Australian rules footballer
- Luke Edwards (actor) (born 1980), American actor
- Luke Egan (born 1970), Australian surfer
- Luke Erede Ejohwomu (1936–2011), Nigerian royal
- Luke Elkin (born 2002), American football player
- Luke Elliot (born 1984), American singer-songwriter
- Luke Elwes (born 1961), British artist
- Luke Epplin, American sportswriter
- Luke Erceg (born 1993), Australian actor
- Luke Erickson (born 1982), American ice hockey player
- Luke Espiritu (born 1974), Filipino lawyer
- Luke Esser, American politician
- Luke Evangelista (born 2002), Canadian ice hockey player
- Luke Evans (disambiguation), multiple people
- Luke Eve (born 1974), Australian film producer
- Luke Eves (born 1989), English rugby union footballer
- Luke Evslin, American politician

=== F ===
- Luke Fagan (1659–1733), Irish bishop
- Luke Falk (born 1994), American football player
- Luke Farmer (born 1980), Australian rules umpire
- Luke Farrell (disambiguation), multiple people
- Luke Farritor (born 2001/2002), American software engineer
- Luke Faust (born 1936), American musician
- Luke Fawcett (1881–1960), British trade unionist
- Luke Feldman (born 1984), Australian cricketer
- Luke Felsch (born 1974), Australian rugby league footballer
- Luke Fenhaus (born 2004), American racing driver
- Luke Ferreira (born 1995), American soccer player
- Luke Ferrelli (born 2005), American football player
- Luke Fickell (born 1973), American football coach
- Luke Fildes (1843–1927), British painter
- Luke Fildes (fencer) (1879–1970), British fencer
- Luke Fischer (born 1994), Armenian-American basketball player
- Luke 'Ming' Flanagan (born 1972), Irish politician
- Luke Fletcher (born 1988), English cricketer
- Luke Fletcher (politician) (born 1995/1996), Welsh politician
- Luke Fleurs (2000–2024), South African soccer player
- Luke Flintoft (1680–1727), English clergyman
- Luke Floriea (born 2001), American football player
- Luke Flynn (born 1988), American composer
- Luke Foley (born 1970), Australian politician
- Luke Foley (footballer) (born 1999), Australian rules footballer
- Luke Folwell (born 1987), British artistic gymnast
- Luke Ford (disambiguation), multiple people
- Luke Fortune (born 1998), Irish Gaelic footballer
- Luke Foster (born 1985), English footballer
- Luke Fowler (born 1978), British artist
- Luke Fox (disambiguation), multiple people
- Luke Francis (born 1989), Welsh racing driver
- Luke Frederick, American politician
- Luke Freeman (born 1992), English footballer
- Luke French (born 1985), American baseball player
- Luke Friend (born 1996), English singer
- Luke Fritz (born 1978), American football player
- Luke Frost (born 1976), British painter
- Luke Fulghum (born 1980), American ice hockey player
- Luke Furner (1837–1912), Australian politician

=== G ===
- Luke Gadsdon (born 1997), Canadian rower
- Luke Gale (born 1988), English rugby league footballer
- Luke Gallichan (born 1995), British cricketer
- Luke Gambin (born 1993), English footballer
- Luke Garbutt (born 1993), English footballer
- Luke Gardiner (1690–1755), Irish politician
- Luke Gardiner, 1st Viscount Mountjoy (1745–1798), Irish politician
- Luke Garner (born 1995), Australian rugby league footballer
- Luke Garnons (died 1615), English politician
- Luke Garrard (born 1985), English footballer
- Luke Garrett (born 1995), Welsh rugby union footballer
- Luke Gavigan, Irish Gaelic footballer
- Luke Gazdic (born 1989), Canadian ice hockey player
- Luke Gebbie (born 1996), Filipino swimmer
- Luke Geissbühler (born 1970), American cinematographer
- Luke Gell (born 1987), English actor
- Luke George (born 1987), English rugby league footballer
- Luke Georghiou (born 1955), British academic administrator
- Luke Gernon (1580–1672), English judge
- Luke Getsy (born 1984), American football player
- Luke Gibleon, American sound editor
- Luke Gifford (born 1995), American football player
- Luke Gilford (born 1986), American writer
- Luke Gillespie (born 1957), American pianist
- Luke Gilliam (born 1976), British artist
- Luke Gingras, Canadian paralympic athlete
- Luke Giverin (born 1993), English footballer
- Luke Glavenich (1893–1935), American baseball player
- Luke Glendening (born 1989), American ice hockey player
- Luke Goddard (born 1988), English golfer
- Luke Godden (born 1978), Australian rules footballer
- Luke Goedeke (born 1998), American football player
- Luke Goodwin (born 1973), Australian rugby league footballer
- Luke Gosling (born 1971), Australian politician
- Luke Goss (born 1968), English singer and actor
- Luke Gower, Australian vocalist
- Luke Graham (disambiguation), multiple people
- Luke Green (disambiguation), multiple people
- Luke Greenbank (born 1997), British swimmer
- Luke Greenfield (born 1972), American film director
- Luke Greenwood (1834–1909), English cricketer
- Luke Gregerson (born 1984), American baseball player
- Luke Grimes (born 1984), American actor
- Luke Grimm (born 2001), American football player
- Luke M. Griswold (1837–1892), American seaman
- Luke Gross (born 1969), American rugby union footballer
- Luke Guldan (born 1986), American model
- Luke Gullick (born 1986), English footballer
- Luke Gunn (born 1985), British track athlete
- Luke Guthrie (born 1990), American golfer
- Luke Guttridge (born 1982), English footballer
- Luke Gygax, American game designer

=== H ===
- Luke Haakenson (born 1997), American soccer player
- Luke Haines (born 1967), English musician
- Luke Hall (disambiguation), multiple people
- Luke Hallett (born 2002), English footballer
- Luke Halpin (born 1947), American actor
- Luke Hamilton (born 1992), Scottish rugby league footballer
- Luke Hamlin (1904–1978), American baseball player
- Luke Hancock (born 1990), American basketball player
- Luke Hannant (born 1993), English footballer
- Luke Hansard (1752–1828), English printer
- Luke Harangody (born 1988), American basketball player
- Luke Harding (born 1968), British journalist
- Luke Harding (linguist) (born 1977), Australian linguist
- Luke Harlen (born 1984), Australian rugby league footballer
- Luke Harrington-Myers (born 2001), Caymanian cricketer
- Luke Harrison (born 2007), English racing driver
- Luke Harrold (born 2008), New Zealand freestyle skier
- Luke E. Hart (1880–1964), American religious figure
- Luke Hartsuyker (born 1959), Australian politician
- Luke Hasegawa, Japanese artist
- Luke Hasz (born 2004), American football player
- Luke Hawx (born 1981), American professional wrestler
- Luke Hayden (1850–1897), Irish politician
- Luke Hayes-Alexander (born 1990), Canadian chef
- Luke Hazlett (1909–1987), New Zealand farmer
- Luke Hedger (born 1995), British motorcycle racer
- Luke Heeney (born 1999), Irish footballer
- Luke Heimlich (born 1996), American baseball player
- Luke Helder (born 1981), American criminal
- Luke Helliwell (born 1988), English rugby league footballer
- Luke Hemmerich (born 1998), German footballer
- Luke Hemmings (born 1996), Australian singer
- Luke Hemsworth (born 1980), Australian actor
- Luke Hendrie (born 1994), English footballer
- Luke Henman (born 2000), Canadian ice hockey player
- Luke Herr (born 1994), Canadian volleyball player
- Luke Herrmann (1932–2016), British art historian
- Luke Heslop (1738–1825), English priest
- Luke Higgins (1921–1991), American football player
- Luke Higham (born 1996), English footballer
- Luke Hines (born 1982), British auto racing driver
- Luke Hinton (born 1990), British motorcycle racer
- Luke Hobson (born 2003), American swimmer
- Luke Hochevar (born 1983), American baseball player
- Luke Hodge (born 1984), Australian rules footballer
- Luke Hodge (rugby league), Italian rugby league footballer
- Luke Hogan, British politician
- Luke Holden (born 1988), English musician
- Luke Holland (disambiguation), multiple people
- Luke Hollman (born 2000), English cricketer
- Luke Holman (born 2003), American baseball player
- Luke Holmes (disambiguation), multiple people
- Luke Homan (1985–2006), American basketball player
- Luke Joseph Hooke (1716–1796), Irish theologian
- Luke Hooley (born 1998), English rugby league footballer
- Luke Hoß (born 2001), German politician
- Luke Houser (born 2001), American track athlete
- Luke Howard (meteorologist) (1772–1864), British chemist
- Luke Howard (musician) (born 1978), Australian composer
- Luke Howarth (born 1972), Australian politician
- Luke Howell (born 1987), English footballer
- Luke Huard (born 1979), American football coach
- Luke Hubbins (born 1991), English footballer
- Luke Hudson (born 1977), American baseball player
- Luke Hughes (disambiguation), multiple people
- Luke Hume (born 1988), American rugby league footballer
- Luke Humphrey (born 1987), American-Canadian actor
- Luke Humphries (born 1995), English darts player
- Luke Hunt (born 1962), Australian journalist
- Luke Hurley (born 1957), New Zealand singer-songwriter
- Luke Hutchinson (born 2002), English footballer
- Luke Hutton (died 1598), English criminal
- Luke Hyam (born 1991), English footballer

=== I ===
- Luke Inman (born 1977), Australian rugby union footballer
- Luke Irvine-Capel (born 1975), British priest
- Luke Isakka (born 1980), Australian rugby league footballer
- Luke Ivanovic (born 2000), Australian footballer

=== J ===
- Luke Jackson (disambiguation), multiple people
- Luke Jacobs (born 2000), English professional wrestler
- Luke Jacobson (born 1997), New Zealand rugby union footballer
- Luke Jacobz (born 1981), Australian actor
- Luke Jager (born 2000), American skier
- Luke James (disambiguation), multiple people
- Luke Jerdy (born 1990), British actor
- Luke Jenkins (born 2002), English footballer
- Luke Jennings (born 1963), British author
- Luke Jensen (born 1966), American tennis player
- Luke Jephcott (born 2000), Welsh footballer
- Luke Jericho (born 1984), Australian rules footballer
- Luke Jerram (born 1974), British installation artist
- Luke Joeckel (born 1991), American football player
- Luke Johnson (disambiguation), multiple people
- Luke Johnsos (1905–1984), American football player
- Luke Johnston (born 1993), Scottish footballer
- Luke Jones (disambiguation), multiple people
- Luke Jongwe (born 1995), Zimbabwean cricketer
- Luke Jordan (1892–1952), American guitarist
- Luke Jordan (footballer) (born 1998), English footballer
- Luke Joyce (born 1987), English footballer
- Luke Jukulile (born 1973), Zimbabwean footballer
- Luke Jurevicius, Australian film director
- Luke Juriga (born 1997), American football player

=== K ===
- Luke Kandra (born 2001), American football player
- Luke Katene (born 1986), New Zealand rugby union footballer
- Luke Keaney (born 1992), Irish Gaelic footballer
- Luke Keary (born 1992), Australian rugby league footballer
- Luke Keaschall (born 2002), American baseball player
- Luke Keeler (born 1987), Irish boxer
- Luke A. Keenan (1872–1924), American politician
- Luke Kelly (disambiguation), multiple people
- Luke Kempner (born 1987), English comedian
- Luke Kendall (born 1981), Australian basketball player
- Luke Kenley (born 1945), American politician
- Luke Kennard (born 1996), American basketball player
- Luke Kennard (poet) (born 1981, British poet
- Luke Kennedy (born 1982), Australian singer
- Luke Kenny (born 1974), Indian actor
- Luke Keough (born 1991), American cyclist
- Luke Killeen (born 2005), Australian stock car racing driver
- Luke Kipkosgei (born 1975), Kenyan runner
- Luke Kirby (disambiguation), multiple people
- Luke Kleintank (born 1990), American actor
- Luke Koo, Ghanaian politician
- Luke Korem (born 1982), American filmmaker
- Luke Kornet (born 1995), American basketball player
- Luke Knapke (born 1997), American basketball player
- Luke Kreamalmeyer (born 1982), American soccer player
- Luke Kromenhoek (born 2005), American football player
- Luke Kuechly (born 1991), American football player
- Luke Kunin (born 1997), American ice hockey player

=== L ===
- Luke Lachey (born 2001), American football player
- Luke Laird (born 1978), American singer-songwriter
- Luke Lambert (born 1981/1982), American auto racing mechanic
- Luke Lamperti (born 2002), American cyclist
- Luke Lane (1893–1976), American police officer
- Luke D. Lavis, American chemist
- Luke Lawrence, British racing driver
- Luke Lawton (born 1980), American football player
- Luke Lea (disambiguation), multiple people
- Luke Leahy (born 1992), English footballer
- Luke Leake (1828–1886), Australian politician
- Luke Lee (born 1991), Singaporean actor
- Luke Pyungse Lee (born 1959), American professor
- Luke Lehnen (born 2002), American football player
- Luke Lennon-Ford (born 1989), British sprinter
- Luke Lennox (born 1983), Australian actor
- Luke Leonard (born 1975), American artist
- Luke Le Roux (born 2000), South African soccer player
- Luke Letcher (born 1994), Australian rower
- Luke Le Tissier (born 1996), English cricketer
- Luke Fleet Lester, American professor
- Luke Letlow (1979–2020), American politician
- Luke Lewis (born 1983), Australian rugby league commentator
- Luke Lilledahl (born 2006), American wrestler
- Luke Lillingstone (1653–1713), British army officer
- Luke Lindenmeyer (born 2003), American football player
- Luke Lindoe (1913–2000), Canadian painter
- Luke Lindon (1915–1988), American football player
- Luke E. Linnan (1895–1975), American judge
- Luke List (disambiguation), multiple people
- Luke Little (born 2000), American baseball player
- Luke Littler (born 2007), English professional darts player
- Luke Livingston (born 1982), Australian rules footballer
- Luke Vincent Lockwood (1872–1951), American furniture designer
- Luke Losey (born 1968), English film director
- Luke Loucks (born 1990), American basketball player
- Luke Loughlin (born 1994/1995), Irish Gaelic footballer
- Luke Lowden (born 1991), Australian rules footballer
- Luke Lowe (1889–?), English footballer
- Luke Lutenberg (1864–1938), American baseball player

=== M ===
- Luke Mably (born 1976), English actor
- Luke Livingston Macassey (1843–1908), Irish engineer
- Luke MacDougall (born 1982), Australian rugby league footballer
- Luke Macfarlane (born 1980), Canadian-American actor
- Luke Machin (born 1988), English musician
- Luke Madeley (born 1996), Irish field hockey player
- Luke Madill (born 1980), Australian cyclist
- Luke Magill (born 1987), English footballer
- Luke Mahoney (born 1980), New Zealand rugby union footballer
- Luke Maile (born 1991), American baseball player
- Luke Malaba (born 1951), Zimbabwean judge
- Luke Manley, American actor
- Luke Mangan (born 1970), Australian restaurateur and chef
- Luke Mariette (born 2003), Welsh footballer
- Luke Marshall (born 1991), Irish rugby player
- Luke Martin (born 1981), Australian basketball player
- Luke Massey (born 1984), British film director
- Luke Massey (rugby league) (born 1970), Australian rugby league footballer
- Luke Masterson (born 1998), American football player
- Luke Matheny (born 1976), American actor
- Luke Matheson (disambiguation), multiple people
- Luke Mathews (born 1995), Australian runner
- Luke Paul Matlatarea (1938–1998), Papua New Guinean bishop
- Luke Maxwell (born 1997), English footballer
- Luke May (born 1989), English rugby league footballer
- Luke Maye (born 1997), American basketball player
- Luke Mbete (born 2003), English footballer
- Luke McAlister (born 1983), New Zealand rugby union footballer
- Luke McBeth (born 1999), Scottish footballer
- Luke McCabe (born 1976), Australian rules footballer
- Luke McCaffrey (born 2001), American football player
- Luke McCann (born 1998), Irish athlete
- Luke McCarthy (born 1993), English footballer
- Luke McCormick (footballer, born 1983), English footballer
- Luke McCormick (footballer, born 1999), English footballer
- Luke McConnell (born 1975), American Marine Corps officer
- Luke McConnell (basketball), American basketball coach
- Luke McCowan (born 1997), Scottish footballer
- Luke McCown (born 1981), American football player
- Luke McCullough (born 1994), Northern Irish footballer
- Luke McDaniel (1927–1992), American singer
- Luke McDermott (born 1987), American ice sled hockey player
- Luke McDonald (disambiguation), multiple people
- Luke McDonnell (born 1959), American artist
- Luke McFadyen (born 1982), Australian rugby union footballer
- Luke McGee (born 1995), English footballer
- Luke McGrath (born 1993), Irish rugby union footballer
- Luke McGregor (born 1983), Australian comedian
- Luke McGuane (born 1987), Australian rules footballer
- Luke A. McKay (born 1981), Australian film director
- Luke McKenzie (disambiguation), multiple people
- Luke McLean (born 1987), Italian rugby player
- Luke McMaster (born 1976), Canadian singer-songwriter
- Luke McNamee (1871–1952), American naval Admiral and businessman
- Luke McNicholas (born 2000), Irish footballer
- Luke McNitt (born 1994), American football player
- Luke McPharlin (born 1981), Australian rules footballer
- Luke McShane (born 1984), English chess player
- Luke McShane (footballer) (born 1985), English footballer
- Luke Meade (born 1996), Irish hurler
- Luke Medley (born 1989), English footballer
- Luke Meerman (born 1975), American politician
- Luke Mejares (born 1975), Filipino singer-songwriter
- Luke Menzies (born 1988), English professional wrestler
- Luke Merrill (born 2000), American soccer player
- Luke Messer (born 1969), American politician
- Luke Metcalf (born 1999), Australian rugby league footballer
- Luke Meyer, American filmmaker
- Luke Milanzi (born 1994), Malawian football
- Luke Miles (born 1986), Australian rules footballer
- Luke "Long Gone" Miles (1925–1987), American singer-songwriter
- Luke Millar, New Zealand visual artist
- Luke Miller (born 1966), English priest
- Luke Miller (politician) (1815–1881), American politician
- Luke Milligan (born 1976), British tennis player
- Luke Mishu (born 1991), American soccer player
- Luke Mitchell (disambiguation), multiple people
- Luke Mitrani (born 1990), American snowboarder
- Luke Mockridge (born 1989), German-Canadian comedian
- Luke Mogelson, American journalist
- Luke Molyneux (born 1998), English footballer
- Luke Mombrea, American musician
- Luke Montebello (born 1995), Maltese footballer
- Luke Montgomery (born 1973/1974), American political activist
- Luke Montgomery (American football) (born 2004), American football player
- Luke Montz (born 1983), American baseball manager
- Luke Moore (disambiguation), multiple people
- Luke Morahan (born 1990), Australian rugby league footballer
- Luke Moran, American filmmaker
- Luke Morgan (rugby union) (born 1992), Welsh rugby union footballer
- Luke Morley (born 1960), English guitarist
- Luke Morris (born 1988), English jockey
- Luke Morrison, Australian canoeist
- Luke Mossey (born 1992), British motorcycle rider
- Luke Mudgway (born 1996), New Zealand cyclist
- Luke Muldowney (born 1986), English footballer
- Luke Mulholland (born 1988), English footballer
- Luke Muller (born 1996), American sailor
- Luke Mullins (born 1984), Australian rules footballer
- Luke Munana (born 1979), American ice dancer
- Luke Munns (born 1980), Australian musician
- Luke Muszkiewicz (born 1977/1978), American politician
- Luke Murianka (born 1951), American bishop
- Luke Murphy (disambiguation), multiple people
- Luke Murray (born 1985), American basketball coach
- Luke Murray (cricketer) (born 1980), New Zealand cricketer
- Luke Murrin (??–1885), Irish-American politician
- Luke Musgrave (born 2000), American football player
- Luke Muyawa (born 1989), Malawian footballer
- Luke Mwananshiku (1938–2003), Zambian banker
- Luke Myer (born 1995), British politician
- Luke Myring (born 1983), English rugby union footballer

=== N ===
- Luke Nankervis (born 2003), Australian rules footballer
- Luke Narraway (born 1983), English rugby union coach
- Luke Nelson (disambiguation), multiple people
- Luke Netterville (1510–1560), Irish judge
- Luke Netterville (priest) (died 1227), Irish archbishop
- Luke Nevill (born 1986), Australian basketball player
- Luke Newberry (born 1990), English actor
- Luke Newman (born 2002), American football player
- Luke Newton (born 1993), English actor
- Luke Nguyen (born 1978), Vietnamese-Australian chef
- Luke Nichols (born 1978), American internet personality
- Luke Nicholson (fl. 2007–present), Canadian singer
- Luke Nichter, American historian
- Luke Nightingale (born 1980), English footballer
- Luke Nolen (born 1980), Australian jockey
- Luke Norman (born 1971), Australian rules footballer
- Luke Norris (disambiguation), multiple people
- Luke Northmore (born 1997), English rugby union footballer
- Luke Nosek (born 1975/1976), Polish-American entrepreneur
- Luke Null (born 1990), American actor and comedian
- Luke Nussbaumer (born 1989), British cricketer
- Luke Nuttall (born 2001), British Paralympic athlete

=== O ===
- Luke O'Brien (born 1988), English footballer
- Luke Chijiuba Ochulor (fl. 1991–present?), Nigerian military officer and politician
- Luke Ockerby (born 1992), Australian cyclist
- Luke O'Connor (disambiguation), multiple people
- Luke O'Dea (born 1990), Irish rugby union player
- Luke O'Dea (footballer) (born 1993), Australian footballer
- Luke O'Donnell (born 1980), Australian rugby league footballer
- Luke O'Dwyer (born 1983), Australian rugby league footballer
- Luke O'Farrell (born 1990), Irish hurler
- Luke Offord (born 1999), English footballer
- Luke Kercan Ofungi (1934–1990), Ugandan businessman and politician
- Luke O'Halloran (born 1991), American painter
- Luke Oliver (born 1984), English footballer
- Luke O'Loughlin (born 1985), Australian actor
- Luke O'Neil, American journalist
- Luke O'Neill (disambiguation), multiple people
- Luke O'Nien (born 1994), English footballer
- Luke O'Reilly (disambiguation), multiple people
- Luke O'Sullivan (politician) (born 1968), Australian rules footballer
- Luke O'Sullivan (politician), Australian politician
- Luke O'Toole (1873–1929), Irish-Gaelic athletic administrator
- Luke Ottens (born 1976), Australian rules footballer
- Luke Ouellette (born 1953), Canadian politician

=== P ===
- Luke Page (born 1991), Papua New Guinean rugby league footballer
- Luke Paget (1853–1937), English bishop
- Luke Paris (born 1994), English footballer
- Luke Parker (disambiguation), multiple people
- Luke Parks (born 2001), Australian rules footballer
- Luke Partington (born 1997), Australian rules footballer
- Luke Pasqualino (born 1990), English actor
- Luke Patience (born 1986), British sailor
- Luke Patten (born 1980), Australian rugby league footballer
- Luke Patterson (born 1987), American football player
- Luke Pato, South African bishop
- Luke Pavlou (born 1996), Australian footballer
- Luke Pavone (born 1995), American soccer player
- Luke Payne (born 1985), American basketball player
- Luke Pearce (born 1987), British rugby union referee
- Luke Pearce (footballer) (born 2004), English footballer
- Luke Pearson (born 1987), British cartoonist
- Luke Pedlar (born 2002), Australian rules footballer
- Luke Pegler (born 1981), Australian actor
- Luke Pen (1960–2002), Australian environmental scientist
- Luke Pennell (born 1996), English footballer
- Luke Penny (born 1981), Australian rules footballer
- Luke Perry (disambiguation), multiple people
- Luke Petitgout (born 1976), American football player
- Luke Petrasek (born 1995), American basketball player
- Luke Phillips (born 1975), Australian rugby league football official
- Luke Pike (disambiguation), multiple people
- Luke Pilkington (born 1990), Australian footballer
- Luke Pilling (born 1997), English footballer
- Luke Piper (born 1966), English painter
- Luke Pither (born 1989), Canadian ice hockey player
- Luke Plange (born 2002), English footballer
- Luke Plapp (born 2000), Australian cyclist
- Luke Plunket (disambiguation), multiple people
- Luke P. Poland (1815–1887), American politician
- Luke Pollard (born 1980), British politician
- Luke Polselli (born 1998), Italian rugby league footballer
- Luke Pomersbach (born 1984), Australian cricketer
- Luke Pope (1740–1825), English florist
- Luke Pople (born 1991), Australian wheelchair basketball player
- Luke Potter (born 1989), English footballer
- Luke Pougnault (born 1980), Australian rower
- Luke Pratt (born 1989), Australian rules footballer
- Luke Preston (born 1976), Welsh judoka
- Luke Prestridge (born 1956), American football player
- Luke Pretorius, South African bishop
- Luke Price (born 1995), Welsh rugby union footballer
- Luke Priddis (born 1977), Australian rugby union footballer
- Luke Procter (born 1988), English cricketer
- Luke Prokop (born 2002), Canadian ice hockey player
- Luke Prokopec (born 1978), Australian baseball player
- Luke Prosser (born 1988), English footballer
- Luke Pryor (1820–1900), American politician
- Luke Puskedra (born 1990), American runner
- Luke Putkonen (born 1986), American baseball player

=== Q ===
- Luke Quigley (born 1981), Australian rugby league footballer
- Luke Quinlivan (born 1985), Australian water polo player

=== R ===
- Luke Radford (born 1988), English cricketer
- Luke Raley (born 1994), American baseball player
- Luke Ramsay (born 1988), Canadian sailor
- Luke Randall, Canadian politician
- Luke A. Rankin (born 1962), American politician
- Luke Samuel Rankin, American politician
- Luke Rathborne, American musician
- Luke Ravenstahl (born 1980), American politician
- Luke Rawson (born 2001), English footballer
- Luke Rayner, British guitarist
- Luke Recker (born 1978), American basketball player
- Luke Redfield (born 1983), American musician
- Luke Reilly (born 1995), Canadian swimmer
- Luke Reimer (born 2000), Australian rugby union footballer
- Luke Reimer (American football) (born 2000), American football player
- Luke Reiner, American politician
- Luke Reeves (born 1980), English-Australian cricketer
- Luke Reynolds (born 1979), American singer-songwriter
- Luke Rhinehart (1932–2020), American novelist
- Luke Rhodes (born 1992), American football player
- Luke Richardson (born 1969), Canadian ice hockey coach
- Luke Richardson (strength athlete) (born 1997), British powerlifter
- Luke Ricketson (born 1973), Australian rugby league footballer
- Luke Ridnour (born 1981), American basketball player
- Luke Rivington (1838–1899), English priest
- Luke Roberts (disambiguation), multiple people
- Luke Robertson (born 1985), British explorer
- Luke Robins (born 1994), Australian cricketer
- Luke Robinson (disambiguation), multiple people
- Luke Rockhold (born 1984), American mixed martial artist
- Luke Rodgers (born 1982), English footballer
- Luke Rollason, British actor
- Luke Romano (born 1986), New Zealand rugby union footballer
- Luke Romyn (born 1975), Australian author
- Luke Ronchi (born 1981), New Zealand-Australian cricketer
- Luke Rooney (born 1983), Australian rugby union footballer
- Luke Rooney (footballer) (born 1990), English footballer
- Luke Roskell (born 1997), English actor
- Luke Ross (born 1972), American comic artist
- Luke Rounds (born 1991), Australian rules footballer
- Luke Rowe (disambiguation), multiple people
- Luke Russe (born 1999), English footballer
- Luke Russell (born 1992), Australian rules footballer
- Luke Russert (born 1985), American news correspondent
- Luke Ryan (born 1996), Australian rules footballer
- Luke Ryan (cricketer) (born 1988), English cricketer

=== S ===
- Luke Everett Strimbold (born 1990), youngest mayor in British Columbia history
- Luke Sabis, American filmmaker
- Luke Samoa (born 1988), New Zealand-Romanian rugby union footballer
- Luke Sanders (born 1985), American mixed martial artist
- Luke Sassano (born 1985), American soccer player
- Luke Him Sau (1904–1991), Chinese architect
- Luke Sauder (born 1970), Canadian skier
- Luke Saunders (born 1993), Canadian curler
- Luke Saville (born 1994), Australian tennis player
- Luke Sayers, Australian businessman
- Luke Scanlan (1841–1915), American farmer and politician
- Luke Scanlon (born 1996), Irish hurler
- Luke Scavuzzo (born 1956), American politician
- Luke Schaub (1690–1758), British diplomat
- Luke Schenn (born 1989), Canadian ice hockey player
- Luke Schenscher (born 1982), Australian basketball player
- Luke Schlemmer (born 1995), South African cricketer
- Luke Schoolcraft (1847–1893), American musical composer
- Luke Schoonmaker (born 1998), American football player
- Luke Schwartz (born 1984), English poker player
- Luke Scott (disambiguation), multiple people
- Luke Scully (born 2000), Welsh rugby union footballer
- Luke Sears (born 1980), English cricketer
- Luke Sela (??–2007), Papua New Guinean newspaper editor
- Luke Sellars (born 1981), Canadian ice hockey player
- Luke Seomore, English film director
- Luke Sewell (1901–1987), American baseball player
- Luke Shackleton (born 1984), Australian rules footballer
- Luke Sharry (born 1990), English footballer
- Luke Shaw (born 1995), English footballer
- Luke Short (1854–1893) American cowboy and gunfighter
- Luke Shuey (born 1990), Australian rules footballer
- Luke Sikma (born 1989), American basketball player
- Luke Icarus Simon (born 1963), Australian author
- Luke Simmonds (born 1979), English snooker player
- Luke Simons (born 1978), American politician
- Luke Simpkin (born 1979), British boxer
- Luke Simpkins (born 1964), Australian politician
- Luke Simpson (born 1994), English footballer
- Luke Sital-Singh (born 1988), British singer-songwriter
- Luke Skaarup (born 1979), Canadian engineer
- Luke Slater (born 1968), English disc jockey
- Luke Smalley (1955–2009), American photographer
- Luke Smith (disambiguation), multiple people
- Luke Snellin (born 1986), English screenwriter
- Luke Somers (1981–2014), American photojournalist
- Luke Elliott Sommer (born 1986), Canadian-American bank robber
- Luke Sommerton, Australian rugby league footballer
- Luke Song (born 1972), American fashion designer
- Luke Southwood (born 1997), English footballer
- Luke Spencer (soccer) (born 1990), American soccer player
- Luke Spokes (born 2000), English footballer
- Luke Staley (born 1980), American football player
- Luke Stannard, American gymnast
- Luke Staton (born 1979), English footballer
- Luke Stauffacher (born 1980), American ice hockey player
- Luke Steckel (born 1985), American football coach
- Luke Steele (disambiguation), multiple people
- Luke Stewart (fighter), American mixed martial artist
- Luke Stewart (musician), American musician
- Luke Stevenson (born 2004), American baseball player
- Luke Steyn (born 1993), Zimbabwean skier
- Luke Stocker (born 1988), American football player
- Luke Stokes, English colonist
- Luke Stoltman (born 1984), Scottish strongman
- Luke Stoughton (born 1977), English cricketer
- Luke Strand (born 1973), American ice hockey coach
- Luke Stricklin (born 1982), American singer-songwriter
- Luke Stringer (born 1995), South African rugby union player
- Luke Strobel (born 1986), American mountain biker
- Luke Strong (disambiguation), multiple people
- Luke Stuart (born 1977), Australian rugby league footballer
- Luke Stuart (baseball) (1892–1947), American baseball player
- Luke Sullivan (born 1961), Australian artist
- Luke Summerfield (born 1987), English footballer
- Luke Supyk (born 2006), New Zealand footballer
- Luke Sutherland (born 1971), Scottish novelist
- Luke Sutton (born 1976), English cricketer
- Luke Swain (born 1982), Australian rugby league footballer
- Luke Swan (born 1984), American football player
- Luke Swann (1983–2022), English cricket coach
- Luke Syson, English museum curator

=== T ===
- Luke Tabone (born 1997), Maltese footballer
- Luke Taft (1783–1863), American industrial pioneer
- Luke Tagi (born 1997), Fijian rugby union footballer
- Luke Tait (born 1981), Canadian rugby union footballer
- Luke Takamura (born 1964), Japanese singer-songwriter
- Luke Talich, American football player
- Luke Tan (born 1977), American singer-songwriter
- Luke Tapscott (born 1991), Australian rules footballer
- Luke Tarsitano (born 1990), American actor
- Luke Tasker (born 1991), American football player
- Luke Taylor (field hockey) (born 1994), English field hockey player
- Luke Taylor (politician), British politician
- Luke Temple, American singer-songwriter
- Luke Tenuta (born 1999), American football player
- Luke Thallon (born 1996), English actor
- Luke Thomas (disambiguation), multiple people
- Luke Thompson (disambiguation), multiple people
- Luke Thurgate, Australian painter
- Luke Tierney, American statistician
- Luke Tilley (born 1983), British entomologist
- Luke Tilt (born 1988), English footballer
- Luke Tittensor (born 1989), English actor
- Luke Toia (born 1977), Australian rules footballer
- Luke Toki (born 1986), Australian television personality
- Luke Tomlinson (born 1977), English polo player
- Luke Tongue (born 1999), New Zealand footballer
- Luke Tonkin, Australian actor
- Luke Top (born 1980), American singer-songwriter
- Luke Torian (born 1958), American politician
- Luke Towers (born 1988), Australian cricketer
- Luke Trainor (disambiguation), multiple people
- Luke Travers (born 2001), Australian basketball player
- Luke Traynor (born 1993), British runner
- Luke Treadaway (born 1984), British actor
- Luke Trembath (1986–2025), Australian snowboarder
- Luke Trickett, Australian swimmer
- Luke Tuch (born 2002), American ice hockey player
- Luke Turley (born 2000), English swimmer
- Luke Turner (footballer) (born 2002), Irish footballer

=== U ===
- Luke Ukara Onyeani, Nigerian politician
- Luke Urban (1898–1980), American football player
- Luke Ussher (??–1632), Irish deacon

=== V ===
- Luke van der Smit (born 1994), Namibian rugby union footballer
- Luke Varney (born 1982), English footballer
- Luke Venne (born 1979), American football coach
- Luke Vercollone (born 1982), American soccer player
- Luke Vibert (born 1973), British musician
- Luke Vivian (born 1981), New Zealand cricketer
- Luke Vogels (born 1983), Australian rules footballer
- Luke Voit (born 1991), American baseball player

=== W ===
- Luke Wadding (1588–1657), Irish historian and friar
- Luke Wadding (bishop) (1628–1687), Irish bishop
- Luke Wade-Slater (born 1998), Irish footballer
- Luke Walker (disambiguation), multiple people
- Luke Wall (born 1996), English footballer
- Luke Wallace (born 1990), English rugby union footballer
- Luke Walsh (born 1987), Australian rugby league footballer
- Luke Walton (disambiguation), multiple people
- Luke Wang (born 2004), American figure skater
- Luke Ward (disambiguation), multiple people
- Luke Warde, English naval officer
- Luke Ward-Wilkinson (born 1993), English actor and singer
- Luke Waterfall (born 1990), English footballer
- Luke Waterworth (born 1996), English rugby league footballer
- Luke Watkins (born 1989), English boxer
- Luke Watkins (hurler) (born 2003), Irish hurler
- Luke Watson (disambiguation), multiple people
- Luke Wattenberg (born 1997), American football player
- Luke J. Weathers (1920–2011), American air force officer
- Luke Weaver (disambiguation), multiple people
- Luke Webb (born 1986), English footballer
- Luke Webb (cricketer) (born 1995), English cricketer
- Luke Webster (born 1982), Australian rules football coach
- Luke Weller (born 1982), Australian rules footballer
- Luke Wells (born 1990), English cricketer
- Luke Wessman, American tattoo artist
- Luke Whisnant (born 1957), American novelist
- Luke White (disambiguation), multiple people
- Luke Whitehead (born 1981), American basketball player
- Luke Whitehouse (born 2002), British gymnast
- Luke Whitelock (born 1991), New Zealand rugby union footballer
- Luke Whitlatch (born 1977), American artist
- Luke Whitlock (born 2006), American swimmer
- Luke Wiles (born 1982), Canadian lacrosse player
- Luke Wilkins (born 1989), Australian baseball player
- Luke Wilkinson (born 1990), English footballer
- Luke Wilkshire (born 1981), Australian footballer
- Luke Williams (disambiguation), multiple people
- Luke Williamson (born 1978), Australian rugby league footballer
- Luke Willian (born 1996), Australian triathlete
- Luke Willson (born 1990), Canadian-American football player
- Luke Wilson (born 1971), American actor
- Luke Wilton, English politician
- Luke Winslow-King (born 1983), American guitarist
- Luke Winters (born 1997), American skier
- Luke Witkowski (born 1990), American ice hockey player
- Luke Witte (born 1950), American basketball player
- Luke Wood, American music executive
- Luke Wood (cricketer) (born 1995), English cricketer
- Luke Woodcock (born 1982), New Zealand cricketer
- Luke Woodhouse (born 1988), English darts player
- Luke Woodland (born 1995), English-Filipino footballer
- Luke Woodrow (1921–2000), Canadian priest
- Luke Woolfenden (born 1998), English footballer
- Luke Worrall (born 1989), English model
- Luke Wright (disambiguation), multiple people
- Luke Wypler (born 2001), American football player

=== Y ===
- Luke Yaklich (born 1976), American basketball coach
- Luke Yankee (born 1961), American writer
- Luke Yates (born 1995), Australian rugby league footballer
- Luke Yendle (born 2000), Welsh rugby union footballer
- Luke Youlden (born 1978), Australian race car driver
- Luke Young (disambiguation), multiple people
- Luke Youngblood (born 1986), English actor
- Luke Chia-Liu Yuan (1912–2003), Chinese-American physicist

=== Z ===
- Luke Zaccaria (born 1993), Australian track cyclist
- Luke Zachrich (born 1981), American mixed martial artist
- Luke Zeller (born 1987), American basketball player
- Luke Zimmerman (born 1979), American actor

== Fictional characters ==
- Lucky Luke, the titular character in the eponymous Belgian comic book series set in the American Old West
- Luke Castellan, one of the main antagonists in Rick Riordan's Percy Jackson & The Olympians series.
- Luke Duke, the elder of two cousins in the 1985 television series Dukes of Hazzard
- Luke Cage, a comic superhero in the Marvel Universe
- Luke the Dog, a recurring character in American silent comedy shorts in the 1910s
- Luke fon Fabre, the main character of the video game Tales of the Abyss
- Luke Hobbs, a character from Fast & Furious franchise
- Luke Skywalker, the main protagonist of the Star Wars original trilogy
- Luke Smith (The Sarah Jane Adventures), in The Sarah Jane Adventures BBC series
- Luke Snyder, on the long-running daytime drama As the World Turns
- Luke Spencer, on the long-running soap opera General Hospital
- Luke Triton, of the Professor Layton video game series

== See also ==
- Saint Luke (disambiguation)
