= Norris Lake (disambiguation) =

Norris Lake is a Tennessee Valley Authority reservoir in Tennessee, impounded by Norris Dam.

Norris Lake or Lake Norris may also refer to:

- Norris Lake (Anoka County, Minnesota)
- Lake Norris in Lake County, Florida

== See also ==
- Norris (disambiguation)
- Luke Norris (disambiguation)
