= Whitlatch =

Whitlatch is a surname. Notable people with the surname include:

- Blake Whitlatch (born 1955), American football player
- Luke Whitlatch (born 1977), American artist
- Terryl Whitlatch (born 1960), American illustrator
- Wayne E. Whitlatch (1928–2017), United States Air Force general
