= Admiral Ward =

Admiral Ward may refer to:

- Aaron Ward (sailor) (1851–1918), U.S. Navy rear admiral
- Alfred G. Ward (1908–1982), U.S. Navy admiral
- Luke Warde (fl. 1588), English admiral
- William Ward (Royal Navy officer) (1829–1900), British Royal Navy admiral
