= Luke Adams =

Luke Adams may refer to:

- Luke Adams (basketball), American basketball player
- Luke Adams (footballer) (born 1994), Australian-born New Zealand footballer
- Luke Adams (potter) (1838–1918), New Zealand potter
  - Luke Adams Pottery, decorative ceramics manufacturer in Christchurch, New Zealand
- Luke Adams (race walker) (born 1976), Australian race walker
- Luke Adams (baseball)

== See also ==
- Luke Adam (born 1990), Canadian ice hockey player
- Luke Adamson (born 1987), English rugby league footballer
