= John Drake (privateer) =

Personal details
- Born: c. 1560 Devon, England
- Died: 1600s
- Relations: Francis Drake (his uncle)
- Occupation: Privateer
- Profession: Sailor

Military service
- Allegiance: Kingdom of England
- Years of service: 1575-1600s
- Rank: Captain
- Battles/wars: Anglo-Spanish War

John Drake (c. 1560–1600s) was an English privateer who attempted an ill-fated incursion against the Spanish Empire on the shores of the Río de la Plata. He was the nephew (or cousin) of Francis Drake.

== Biography ==
In 1572 Johnb Drake was witness to Mule Train Raids and one of the trupet toting lost boys during the Nombe De Dios Raid. He was the same page who won the Captain Gold necklace and is the son of John Drake who was the captain of the Swan. He was among the crew who circumnavigated the globe in 1577-1580. Around 1583, John Drake and his crew departed from the port of Plymouth to the south of the Atlantic Ocean. The ship under his command, The 40-ton bark Francis, was part of the Edward Fenton expedition to the Pacific. After their victory at the battle of São Vicente and the subsequent split of the English force, Drake headed to the Rio de la Plata. The Francis was wrecked on the mouth of the river, in a shoal later known in Spanish as Banco Inglès after this incident. He and his men were captured by Charrúa natives in today's Uruguayan coast, with whom they remained captive for some time. Only Drake and his second-in-command survived the ordeal to reach Buenos Aires where both of them were arrested by the Spanish authorities, being sent to the city of Santa Fe. They were interrogated there through the intervention of an English interpreter, before conqueror Don Juan de Torres de Vera y Aragón and the notary Don Francisco Pérez de Burgos.

After his interrogation, John Drake was sent to Asunción and then to Lima, where he was tried and sentenced to a lifetime of captivity. In 1587, a Portuguese pilot reported he was alive and well in Peru. Drake never returned to England. The last mention of John Drake in a Spanish official document was in 1595, during the trial of Richard Hawkins and his companions, captured in San Mateo's Bay (a.k.a. Atacames Bay).

A narrative of Francis Drake's circumnavigation was drawn from John Drake's interrogation by Inquisitor Antonio Gutiérrez de Ulloa at Lima.
