= Luke Ward (disambiguation) =

Luke Ward is a fictional character in The OC.

Luke Ward may also refer to:

- Luke Ward, fictional character in The Mark of the Rani
- Luke Warde (fl.1588), English sea captain

== See also ==
- Luke Ward-Wilkinson, English actor
