= Luke Johnson =

Luke Johnson may refer to:

- Luke Johnson (businessman) (born 1962), British businessman and former chairman of the British Channel 4
- Luke Johnson (game designer), American game designer of role-playing games
- Luke Johnson (Mormon) (1807–1861), American leader in the Latter Day Saint movement
- Luke Johnson (drummer) (born 1981), former drummer for the Welsh band Lostprophets
- Luke Johnson, inventor of the Luke Johnson Phone Experiment on YouTube
- Luke Timothy Johnson (born 1943), professor of theology
- Luke Johnson (ice hockey) (born 1994), professional ice hockey player
- Luke Johnson (tennis) (born 1994), British tennis player
- Luke S. Johnson (politician) (1847–1910), American politician and soldier
