= Adopt-a-Pet.com =

Online pet adoption organization and website

- Company type: Web service
- Available in: English
- Founded: 2000
- CEO: Jeannine Taaffe
- Services: Adoption for pets

Adopt a Pet is an adoption web service that advocates pet adoption, gathering information from over 15,000 pet shelters in the U.S. and Canada, with a searchable data base. The web site promotes spaying and neutering of pets and pet adoption through conventional and social media presence, public service announcements, and interactions with local governments. Since 2015, Adopt a Pet has been offering its visitors manuals for pets.

== History ==
Adopt a Pet was founded in 2000 by David Meyer, Steve Abbey, Luke Montgomery, Amy Luwis, and Doug McKee as 1-800-Save-a-Pet.com. Initially, 1-800-Save-a-Pet.com was a program designed to end the overpopulation of companion animals in shelters in Los Angeles, California. The program was based on one-year research.

1-800-Save-a-Pet.com participated in a pet rescue effort in the aftermath of Hurricane Katrina in 2005.

In September 2008, the company changed its name to Adopt a Pet, In October 2008, Adopt a Pet partnered with Care2 to launch America's Favorite Animal Shelter contest. The winning shelters were awarded a total of $20,000 on December 4, 2008. The contest took place again in 2009.

In January 2009, Adopt a Pet launched a national ADOPT campaign accompanied by a poster created by Shepard Fairey using a photo by Clay Myers to raise awareness about adoption at the time President Obama was looking for a dog for his family. This poster was on the cover of the Spring 2009 issue of Dog's Life Magazine and was fashioned after Fairey's Obama Hope poster.

In April 2009, Adopt a Pet expanded its search to include, in addition to cats and dogs, rabbits, birds, and small animals (such as hamsters and guinea pigs), farm-type animals, horses, amphibians, reptiles, and fish. In May of the same year, it launched a social media campaign, "Social Petworking", introducing the capability to attach a photo to an email or to a Facebook page.

In June 2010, Adopt a Pet paid tribute to Rue McClanahan, who was known as an actress and a supporter of pet adoption.

In 2011, White Sox pitcher Mark Buehrle and his wife Jamie partnered with Adopt a Pet to create a public service billboard campaign to promote pet adoption.

In 2021, Adopt a Pet was acquired by Kinship, a subsidiary of Mars, Inc.

== Executives ==
- Jeannine Taaffe, CEO
