= Luke Watson (disambiguation) =

Luke Watson (born 1983) is a South African rugby union player.

Luke Watson may also refer to:

- Luke Watson (sprinter) (born 1957), British sprinter
- Luke Watson (runner) (born 1980), American middle-distance runner, All-American for the Notre Dame Fighting Irish track and field team

== See also ==
- Luke Wilson (born 1971), American actor
- Luke (name)
- Watson (surname)
