= Luke Pike =

Luke Pike may refer to:

- Sonny Pike (born 1980s), English footballer
- Luke Owen Pike (1835–1915), English barrister-at-law, writer and historical researcher
