= Luke O'Neill =

Luke O'Neill may refer to:

- Luke O'Neill (footballer) (born 1991), English footballer
- Luke O'Neill (scientist), professor of biochemistry

== See also ==
- Luke O'Neil, American journalist
