= The Black Dog of Newgate =

Legendary creature

Coordinates: 51°30′56.49″N 0°06′06.91″W

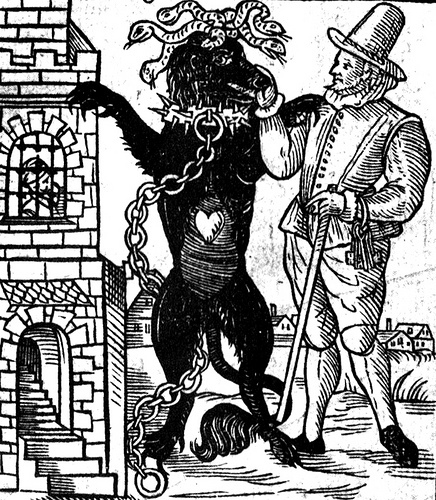
- The Black Dog of Newgate, from the book The Discovery of a London Monster Called the Black Dog of Newgate published in 1638

Creature information
- Grouping: Spectral Black Dogs
- Folklore: Legend of Newgate Prison

Origin
- First attested: 1598
- Country: England
- Region: London
- Habitat: Old Newgate Prison

The Black Dog of Newgate is a legend concerning the haunting of the former Newgate Prison of London, which was located next to the Old Bailey (The Central Criminal Court), close to St. Paul's Cathedral, in London, England.

This account of a haunting based at the prison is an example of the English Black Dog category of supernatural manifestations, featuring a spectral hound of ill-omen or malicious intent, which is a notable archetype in British folklore and superstition.

The earliest account of the story dates from the publication The Discovery of a London Monster, called The Blacke Dogg of Newgate: Profitable for all Readers to Take Heed by.

== History ==
Although believed to have long existed in folklore previously, the earliest recorded account of the legend dates from 1596, and is credited to a prison inmate called Luke Hutton. A notable copy of the book and its woodcut frontispiece is held at the Guildhall Library, London.

The story recounts that during a famine in the reign of King Henry III of England, a scholar was incarcerated in Newgate Prison who had the reputation of being a sorcerer, a warlock who had Done much hurt to the Kings subjects with his Charms and Devilish Witchcraft. The famine was so severe and the conditions so bad during this terrible period that the prisoners had already resorted to cannibalism, and soon after his arrival they consumed this new arrival, who was unable to physically defend himself. Shortly after this crime was committed, the inmates guilty of his death reportedly began seeing the spectre of a monstrous black dog walking up and down the Prison, which they were convinced was the sorcerers spirit returning to avenge himself upon his murderers. This being reportedly killed and consumed those responsible one by one, until the last survivors, driven mad by fear, broke out of the gaol and escaped.

This creature is supposed to have pursued the escapees wherever they went or tried to hide until it had avenged itself upon them all.

Towards the end of the narrative the unnamed stranger claims that the tale of the spiritual dog is untrue, and that the only Black Dog he has heard any account of is a great blacke Stone standing in the dungeon called "Limbo", the place where the condemned prisoners are put after their judgement, and against which felons have dashed out their brains in their distress.

Intended as a morality tale preaching against the low behaviour and base living of the inmates of the prison, during a period when conditions for inmates were particularly horrific, the story was allegedly recounted by Luke Hutton to a stranger only described as a poor Thin-gut fellow in the Black Dog Public House.

Hutton dedicated the work to the then Lord Chief Justice Sir John Pophame, and owing to its moral theme it may have helped to secure its release.

There is some speculation as to whether this haunting of the Black Dog of Newgate is also connected to nearby Amen Court, where an alleged ghost, supposedly in the form of an amorphous "Black Shape," creeps along the high wall which formerly separated the prison from the homes of many of the churchmen of St. Paul's Cathedral. Sightings of this shape have never been clear enough for its physical form to be identified.
