= Luke Trickett =

Australian swimmer

Sport
- Sport: Swimming
- Strokes: Breaststroke
Medal record
Representing Australia
Oceania Championships
Gold medal – first place	2002 Noumea	200m breaststroke
Silver medal – second place	2002 Noumea	50m breaststroke
Silver medal – second place	2002 Noumea	100m breaststroke

Luke Trickett is an entrepreneur and former national team swimmer from Australia. He is the husband of fellow Australian swimmer Libby Trickett (née Lenton).

At the 2002 Oceania Swimming Championships, he won the 200 breaststroke in a then Championships Record of 2:16.38. He also finished second in the 50 and 100 breaststrokes.

He also was a finalist in the 50m breaststroke at the 2008 Australian Trials. He subsequently tore a ligament.

He left swimming in 2008. His wife left in 2009. After leaving swimming, he also left his job as a stockbroker and set up his own fund, Blue Stamp. The rates were successful, but he then had to market it, which he struggled with. While working on that, he founded Marmalade, which he described as "an invoice payment service to assist small and medium-sized businesses". Marmalade raised sixteen million. He is also the founder of Backpocket, an app to make it possible for the organizer to "pay her share and have a payment service that settles the rest, then... a link to forward to her mates" for them to use to pay her back. He has described business as like a team sport.

He had his fourth child in 2023. He also owns shares in many companies, including Silver Chef, with which he "killed" a proposed financial deal.

He was named in The Courier-Mail's 25 Queensland Power Couples.
