= Luke Walton (disambiguation) =

Luke Walton (born 1980), is an American professional basketball coach and former player

Luke Walton may also refer to:

- Luke Walton (rower) (born 1979), American Olympic rower

== See also ==
- Luke Wilton, a member of the Parliament of England in the 15th century
- Lukas Walton, American billionaire
