= Luke Myring =

English rugby union player

- Born: 20 December 1983 (age 42) Leicester, England
- Height: 1.80 m (5 ft 11 in)
- Weight: 94 kg (14 st 11 lb)
- School: John Cleveland College
- University: Loughborough University

Rugby union career
- Position: Fly-half/Inside Centre
Senior career
Years	Team	Apps	(Points)
2003–2004	Leicester Tigers	7	(3)
2004–2007	Northampton Saints	14	(5)
2008–2009	Capitolina	36	
2009–2010	L'Aquila	17	
2010–11	Roma	9	
2011–2015	Coventry	41	

Luke Myring (born 20 December 1983 in Leicester) is an English rugby union player. He usually plays at Fly-half or Inside Centre. Myring was a product of the Leicester Tigers's academy, stepping up to play for the first team with Andy Goode, Ross Broadfoot and Ramiro Pez. Myring joined Northampton Saints to play first team rugby. While he played games for Saints, his game time at fly half was restricted by the presence of Carlos Spencer. He played much of his rugby for the Saints in the centres. Luke left Northampton at the end of the 2006 – 2007 season. In 2008 he signed for Italian Super 10 (now Top12) team AlmavivA Capitolina.
