= Luke Thomas =

Luke Thomas may refer to:

- Luke Thomas (chef) (born 1993), British chef
- Luke Thomas (journalist) (born 1979), American mixed martial arts journalist, analyst, and radio host
- Luke Thomas (footballer, born 2001), English football defender for Leicester City
- Luke Thomas (footballer, born 1999), English football midfielder for Bristol Rovers
- Luke Thomas (rugby league), Wales international rugby league footballer
- Luke Thomas, guitarist with The Pictures
- Luke Thomas, Irish Dance award winner at 2003 Meteor Awards
