= Luke Adams Pottery =

Luke Adams Pottery was a decorative ceramics manufacturer in Christchurch, New Zealand. It was set up in 1881 by Luke Adams, an emigrant from England. The business closed in the 1965 and was the longest-operating pottery in New Zealand.

== History ==
Luke Adams (1838–1918) migrated to Christchurch from England with his family in 1873. A trained potter, he initially accepted a position with a brickworks, run by a man named William Neighbours in Christchurch but, by 1875, he had moved to another company and returned to making domestic ware. In 1881 this company closed their pottery making section and Adams invested in setting up his own business. He purchased the surplus moulds and plant and, with the help of his eldest three sons, he set up Luke Adams Pottery Limited. After several moves the company and the Adams family settled on a site in Colombo Street, Sydenham, Christchurch, where the company was to remain until the business was sold in 1965.

The Luke Adams Pottery created a tradition of domestic colonial pottery and applied artistic design to its products. The company entered products in various exhibitions and shows. Most notably the pottery won awards at the Melbourne International Exhibition (1880), Australia and the Colonial and Indian Exhibition, London of 1886.

One of the more unusual products created by Luke Adams Pottery were Kiddibricks. One of the sons of the family, Percival Adams, worked on created a brick pressing machine and constructed a working model. The small bricks this created were fired and sold as a children's toy. This was highly successful and the bricks were much in demand from local families. The manufacture of Kiddibricks became automated in 1958 and the machinery was sold to Crown Lynn as part of the plant with the rest of business in 1965. Shortly afterwards the Kiddibrick machinery was purchased back and was stored for some years until it was purchased from the Adams family estate and brought back into service until 1999.

Pottery from Luke Adams is now highly collectable in New Zealand and also appears in the collection of the Auckland War Memorial Museum and Museum of New Zealand Te Papa Tongarewa.
