= Luke Donald (footballer) =

Australian rules footballer

Personal information
- Full name: Luke Donald
- Born: 4 February 1971 (age 55)
- Original teams: CBC St Kilda, (VAFA)

Playing career^{1}
Years	Club	Games (Goals)
1990	St Kilda	3 (3)
- ^{1} Playing statistics correct to the end of 1990.

Luke Donald (born 4 February 1971) is a former Australian rules footballer who played three games for St Kilda in the Australian Football League (AFL) in 1990. He scored 3 goals in total, and was recruited from CBC St Kilda in the Victorian Amateur Football Association (VAFA).
