= Luke Holland (disambiguation) =

Luke Holland (born 1993) is an American drummer.

Luke Holland may also refer to:

- Luke Holland (filmmaker) (1948–2020), English filmmaker
- Luke Holland (politician), candidate in 2022 United States Senate special election in Oklahoma
