= Luke Plunket =

Luke Plunket may refer to:

- Luke Plunket, 1st Earl of Fingall
- Luke Plunket, 3rd Earl of Fingall
