= Luke Steele =

Luke Steele may refer to:

- Luke Steele (footballer), English football goalkeeper
- Luke Steele (musician), New Zealand–born Australian musician, singer and songwriter of The Sleepy Jackson and Empire of the Sun
