= Luke Erede Ejohwomu =

Nigerian monarch

Ovie Luke Erede Ejohwomu, Adakaji 1
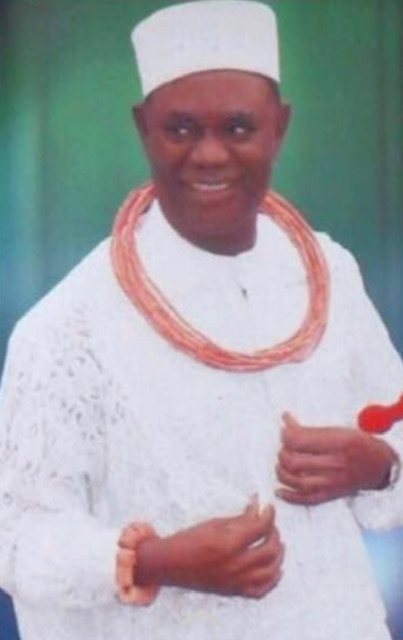

Ovie of Abraka
- In office 15 March 1994 – 2010
- Succeeded by: Lucky Ochuko Ararile

Personal details
- Born: 1 June 1936
- Died: March 2011 (aged 74)

Luke Erede Ejohwomu, Adakaji was the Ovie of Abraka Kingdom in Nigeria. He hailed from the Ovowodo/Umeghe ruling house. He was born on 1 June 1936 to the family of Erede Ejohwomu and Aliatete Ejohwomu. Under his uncle, Patrick Ejohwomu, he commenced his primary school education in 1944 at the Native Authority (N.A.) School, Amai. In 1950, he moved to the N.A. School, Otu-Jeremi; in 1951, he transferred to the Catholic School at Okpara Water Side where he obtained the standard six certificate. In 1952, he gained admission into St. Thomas College, Ibusa from where he obtained Teacher Grade Two Certificate in 1956.

Ejohwomu taught at Catholic Modern School, Abraka between 1957 and 1958. During this period, he read privately for Ordinary and Advanced Levels of the GCE in order to qualify for admission into the university. He passed both examinations in 1958 and 1960 respectively. In October, 1961, he gained admission into the University of Nigeria, Nsukka, to read economics. He obtained a B.Sc. degree in economics in June 1964. On graduating, Ejohwomu taught in Urhobo College, Effurun. He taught economics at the Higher School Certificate classes of the college. In September 1968, he was admitted into the University of Ibadan to read for a post-graduate diploma in Librarianship, a course he successfully completed in June, 1969. In 1978, he attended a course at the International Training Centre of the International Labour Organization in Turin, Italy, and obtained a diploma in Training Methodology from that institution the same year.

He served in many ministries and departments in the Bendel State Civil Service. From July 1969 to about June 1981, he served in the cooperative division of the Ministry of Trade and Industry as an assistant registrar, senior assistant registrar and principal assistant registrar and assistant chief registrar of cooperatives. He transferred to the administrative cadre in 1981 and moved to the Ministry of Social Development and Culture and headed the culture division of that ministry. Later, he was deployed to the following local government areas as a chairman of Burutu Local Government Area, July 1986 to December 1987, Isoko Local Government Area, July 1989 to December 1990 and Ughelli South Local Government Area, October to December 1991.

Deployed back to the main civil service, he was assigned to the economic matters division of the Military's Governor's Office, Benin City, as its secretary. In that position, he represented the governor's office of the Public Utilities Board as a director in 1988 and 1989. From there, he was posted to the Ministry of Agriculture and Natural Resources, Benin City, as a director of finance. When Delta State was created in 1991, he was one of the few civil servants selected by Chief Felix Ibru, the executive governor of the new state, to prepare a programme for its smooth take off. Working with two politicians, Ejohwomu also prepared the plan of activities for the establishment of the Agricultural Development Programme. He attained the rank of a Substantive Director (Grade Level 16) in the Ministry of Agricultural and Natural Resources, before retiring in 1992. On retirement, he was appointed chairman, National Directorate of Employment, Delta State Chapter, by Ibru.

Ejohwomu was appointed to the throne after he was unanimously chosen as Ovie Elect of Abraka Kingdom by his people in accordance with the Bendel State Legal Notice No.99 of 1979 now applicable in Delta State. He was installed according to tradition on 15 March 1994. On 17 April 1995, the Military Administrator of Delta State Group Captain Ibrahim Kefas, FSS, PSC presented him with a staff of office. His palace became a meeting point for Ovies, Emirs, Obis, Igwes and Obas from all over Nigeria.

Following the reign of Luke Erede Ejohwomu, Adakaji 1, and the consequent splitting of the Kingdom into two separate kingdoms, Lucky Ochuko Ararile (rtd) was enthroned as the Ovie of Umiaghwa-Abraka Kingdom in April 2012.

He died in March 2011.

== Hobbies ==
Ejohwomu listened to classical music and enjoyed the football, and documentary films.

== Religion ==
He was a Christian (a practicing Catholic and a Knight of St John International, KSJI) St Georges Squad.

== Marital status ==
Ejohwomu was married to Oniemo Elizabeth Eghenure Ejohwomu (Nee Ohwovoriole) daughter of D.G Ohwovoriole, Ugbenu Alaka 11, Ohworode of Olomu Kingdom. They had children and grandchildren.

== Charities ==
Adakaji 1 ROYAL Foundation

== Membership ==
He was a member of the following:

- Delta State Council of Traditional Rulers
- Ukoko R’Ivie R’Urhobo
- Association of Traditional Rulers of Oil Mineral Producing Communities
- Rotary Club of Nigeria (Honorary)
- South-South Traditional Rulers Forum
- Delta State Traditional Council on Nation Development Summit of Traditional Rulers
- Knights of St. John International (KSJI)
- Catholic Men Organisation
- St Thomas's Old Boys Association, Ibusa
- University of Nigeria Nsukka Alumni Association (Great Lions)
- Grand Patron of many unions, social and religious organizations e.g. Catholic Youth Organisation, Abraka Chapter, Abraka both at home and diaspora.
