= Luke Moore (disambiguation) =

Luke Moore (born 1986) an English professional football striker

Luke Moore may also refer to:

- Luke Moore (footballer, born 1988), English semi-professional footballer
- Luke Moore (broadcaster)
- Luke Moore, character in 13Hrs
