= Luke Johnson Phone Experiment =

The Luke Johnson Phone Experiment was started by 27-year-old Arizona resident Luke Johnson. On September 18, 2006, Johnson posted a self-made video on YouTube inviting the world to call him on his cell phone. The stated purpose of the experiment is to see how many people will call someone they have never met.

Since the inception of the experiment, Luke has received calls from around the planet. As of April 19, 2007 he has 136,768 telephone calls.

== See also ==
- Social impact of YouTube
