= Luke Thompson =

Luke Thompson may refer to:

- Sir Luke Thompson (politician) (1867–1941), British coal merchant and Conservative politician
- Luke Thompson (rugby league) (born 1995), English rugby league player for St Helens RLFC
- Luke Thompson (rugby union) (born 1981), Japanese rugby union player
- Luke Thompson (actor) (born 1988), British actor
- Luke Thompson (Australian footballer) (born 1991), Australian rules footballer
- Luke Willis Thompson (born 1988), New Zealand artist
