= Luke Montgomery =

American viral commercial director

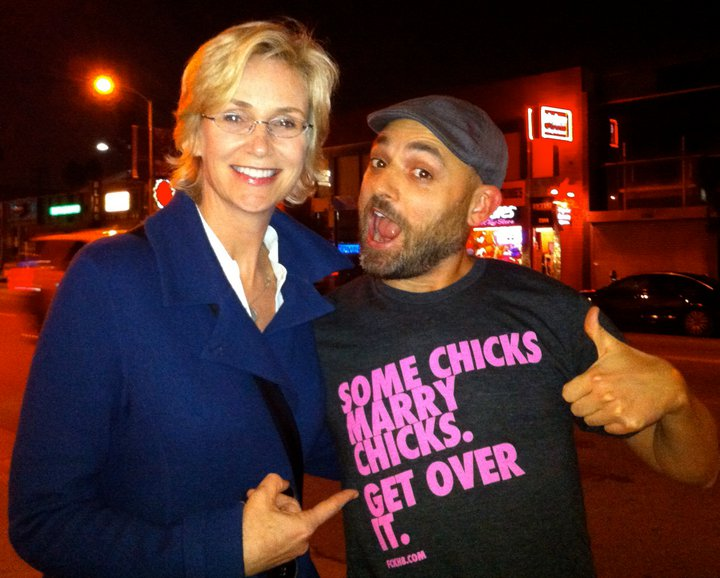
- Luke Montgomery with actress Jane Lynch (left) pointing to his "Some Chicks Marry Chicks, Get Over It" T-shirt from his brand and videos.
- Born: 1973/1974
- Occupation: Viral Commercial Director

Luke Montgomery (born 1973 or 1974) is an American viral commercial director, entrepreneur, media strategist and political activist.

Known for directing controversial comedic viral ads produced in a style Time described as "shock tactic advertising," and Entertainment Tonight called "the hottest topic on the planet," Montgomery's commercials, politically charged PR stunts and social cause activism has generated what The New York Times called "vast publicity," and drawn reactions from awards and media accolades to scornful negative outrage.

Labeled by the Los Angeles Times as the "director behind the video that took the Internet by storm," Montgomery's work has been slammed by President Trump as "stupid," "terrible," and "disgraceful," been the topic of comedy spoof on Saturday Night Live, and praised by President Clinton, who said of his HIV/AIDS efforts, "he was absolutely right." The Advocate wrote of Montgomery, "He is the symbol of a deeply divided America."

Called an "activist clothing brand" by Fast Company, Montgomery's youth-targeted apparel merchandising success, FCKH8, sold T-shirts emblazoned with messages against homophobia, sexism and racism. The fashion brand was said to have created controversy to capitalize on social change in what Forbes called "retail profit dressed up in lamb's clothing." The Washington Post wrote that Montgomery's viral sales content was "clearly good business" that "built a veritable empire by throwing the veil of social good over more capitalist ambitions."

== Early activism and media attention ==
=== Teenage name change media stunt ===
At age 19, the Los Angeles Times described Luke as a "self-created media creature" for his attention-getting and frequent TV, radio and press appearances on gay rights issues. As part of his outspoken media persona, Montgomery legally changed his last name to "Sissyfag" for a period of roughly two years. The Washington Post wrote, "Sissyfag, 20, was born Luke Montgomery, but adopted his unusual surname at age 17 and had it legally made his last year. He said he has been called those names for years and wanted to disarm the words and refashion them into a badge of pride."

Montgomery briefly ran for mayor of Washington, D.C., to draw attention to the city's AIDS crisis, with The Washington Post writing, "Luke Sissyfag, an AIDS activist known for heckling President Clinton, announced yesterday that he is running for D.C. mayor to force the other candidates and voters to focus on battling the fatal disease." While the paper described him as "deadly serious" on the issue it also pointed out "He does not hesitate to camp it up: He wore lipstick and star-shaped rhinestone earrings to the announcement and issued news releases on white paper with pink polka dots.”

Labeled an "anything-for-attention radical gay activist" by The Advocate, the publication wrote, "The mere mention of his name provokes bitter arguments among people who don't even know him." While the Los Angeles Times reported that Sissyfag's "flamboyance makes some buttoned-up gay conservatives squirm," it also quoted gay republican author and operative Marvin Liebman as saying, "Luke Sissyfag is doing a service to the community."

A topic of on-air conversation across talk radio from Howard Stern to Rush Limbaugh, and with appearances on national media platforms such as MTV News and Donahue, Luke Sissyfag was a visible early 90s presence on gay issues. In a 2007 radio broadcast, Rush Limbaugh reflected on the LGBTQ activist's impact saying, "Who could forget Luke Sissyfag?"

=== Clinton HIV/AIDS pressure campaign ===
In 2018, former President Bill Clinton credited Montgomery's efforts for an increase in his administration's HIV/AIDS spending, saying on The Daily Show with Trevor Noah, "He was absolutely right, and we wound up doubling funding for treatment and research."

Clinton's comments referred back to a months-long pressure campaign beginning on World AIDS Day in 1993 and into early 1994, where Montgomery would publicly interrupt and confront President Clinton, Secretary of Health and Human Services Donna Shalala and U.S. Surgeon General Jocelyn Elders during televised public speeches, private church visits and photo ops demanding further action on the HIV/AIDS epidemic.

Montgomery's multiple televised confrontations with President Clinton and members of his administration would garner media coverage, and the attention would prompt The New York Times to run an editorial titled "A Renewed Urgency On AIDS" describing Montgomery's critique as, "only fair."

In an interview, U.S. Surgeon General Joycelyn Elders said, "I've met Luke on several occasions now, and I respect what he's doing. I think it's OK for him to feel like we're not doing enough. I don't feel like we're doing enough. One of the wonderful things about America is that Luke can go around and be critical of me and of the president if he doesn't think we're doing enough."

After Montgomery interrupted Clinton's 1993 World AIDS Day speech and accused him of not taking enough action against the disease, Clinton told the audience, "The fact that he's in here expressing his frustration. … I'd rather he be in here screaming at me than having given up all together."

== Viral commercials and product sales ==
=== Merchandising, media reaction and controversy ===
In 2010, Montgomery founded the political merchandise and T-shirt brand FCKH8 and directed a series of comedic F-word filled youth-targeted viral commercials that collectively earned hundreds millions of views across social media platforms. The brand's advertising campaigns sold over 300,000 T-shirts with various slogans against homophobia, racism and sexism. Time magazine called Montgomery's style "shock tactic advertising" for featuring frequent use of swear words in the commercials while pointing out that the brand did "advocate for social change."

The brand was often accused in news reporting of selling millions of dollars of merchandise by profiting off of social causes to sell products, with The Washington Post writing, "It's clearly good business for FCKH8: The company has built a veritable empire by throwing the veil of social good over more capitalist ambitions."

In 2014, Montgomery directed the "Potty-Mouth Princesses" ad campaign featuring young girls "dropping F-bombs for feminism." The gender equality video was called the "hottest topic on the planet" by Entertainment Tonight, described by Fast Company as "a brash, funny way to make a serious point" and slammed by Inside Edition for "causing a national firestorm." Advertising industry journal Adweek named the commercial its "Ad of the Day" and Mashable.com branded it the most viewed and shared viral ad on Earth in October 2014. The Los Angeles Times would describe Montgomery as "the director behind the video that took the Internet by storm." The controversial ad campaign would go on to raise over $30,000 for women's charities and won the 2014 Public Interest Silver Epica Award.

Media coverage of the series of ads was sizable and mixed, with Forbes magazine writing, "Every TV news outlet, it seemed, was running the controversial spot." A Time headline declared, "'F-Bombs for Feminism: Potty-Mouthed Princesses Use Bad Word for Good Cause' is the latest example of feminism gone wrong in America." The ad campaign was attacked on Fox's The Five, with Kimberly Guilfoyle saying, "The adults that made it should be ashamed of themselves." On the same show Greg Gutfeld stated, "The irony is that they are talking about abuse while being used as props for profit." Sharon Osbourne of CBS's The Talk said, "Having whole group of precocious little kids doing this. I don't get it." Rachael Ray, who had Montgomery on as a guest of her show, said, "Luke, I was very surprised that this feminist video was made by a man. Very provocative. Makes a great point." In an interview by the daytime talk show The Doctors, that was recorded on set with Montgomery filming a domestic violence-themed sequel to the commercial, Montgomery said, "Say what ever you want about the videos that I make, love them or hate them, I don't care. I'm just glad they're out there. Every time I see those numbers go up in terms of views and shares, we're like this team of people using in the Internet to spread these messages, and that's really cool."

FCKH8 T-shirts appeared across social media, TV shows and entertainment with actor Zac Efron talking about his "Some Dudes Marry Dudes, Get Over It" tee in a magazine interview, saying, "I do own that shirt." In 2014, the New York Historical Society specially selected a FCKH8 "Some Dudes Marry Dudes, Get Over It" T-shirt designed by Montgomery for inclusion in its 100-year historical time capsule so, "One hundred years from now, people are going to see how New Yorkers dressed and spoke, and what New York as a whole looked like."

Montgomery reportedly sold the brand in 2014.

== Anti-Trump "Deport Racism" campaign ==
=== Viral political content ===
In 2015, Donald Trump took to Fox Business to attack Montgomery's Deport Racism campaign ad titled, "Trashing Trump: Latino Kids Pound Racism Like a Piñata." Trump called the video "terrible" and a "disgrace." Montgomery's viral T-shirt commercial featuring Latino children used offensive swear words in response to Trump's words on Mexicans and immigrants. The video was produced in the style of his previous FCKH8 ads with rhyming expletive-laden lines making political points directed at Trump. Politico quoted Montgomery defending the language in the video, saying, "Calling Mexican immigrants 'rapists,' 'murderers,' and 'drug dealers?' Calling kids, American citizens, 'anchor babies?' You can only get away with that if you think they're second class because they're brown. I think they're using a bad word for a good cause."

The video caused a social media and cable news uproar. In an interview on Fox & Friends, Senator Marco Rubio slammed the political video as "outrageous," stating, "What kind of parent allows their children to go on a video like that and use that kind of profanity?" An article on right-wing site Breitbart covering the video generated over 44,000 negative comments from readers in just over 24 hours. Trump's on-air criticism slamming the commercial and saying, "I think it's just terrible. Anybody that would do an ad like that is stupid." served to spark increased interest in the video and accelerate its viral reach online and across the media.

=== Cash reward stunt, Larry David calls Trump "racist" on SNL ===
Donald Trump was scheduled to host Saturday Night Live the same week that Montgomery's Deport Racism video went viral. Days before Trump's appearance, The Hollywood Reporter ran the headline, "'Saturday Night Live' on Heckling High-Alert for Donald Trump Appearance" with the story saying, "Heckling will happen, if Luke Montgomery has anything to do with it. The Los Angeles-based activist is offering $5,000 to anyone in the studio audience heard saying 'Trump is a racist' on the air." The reward was widely reported online and across the media, with The Daily Beast writing that the group had "promised a bounty for anyone who would disrupt Trump on live TV."

On the night of the SNL broadcast, PBS news reported, "Donald Trump hadn't gotten far into his opening monologue before trouble occurred. An off-screen heckler interrupted with a cry of 'You're a racist!'" From the stage, Trump responded to the outburst saying, "Oh, I knew this was going to happen" before the camera cut to the studio audience showing SNL frequent guest Larry David. David then shouted, "Trump's a racist!" David's scripted "interruption" of the show's broadcast resulted in thousands of media stories with headlines pairing the words "Trump" and "racist" around the globe.

After the SNL broadcast, Montgomery was quoted by TheWrap as saying, "The fact that 'Saturday Night Live' was so afraid that somebody in their audience would interrupt the show forced them to have to call Donald Trump a racist in the script. It was the elephant in the room and they had to address it. ... It actually brought more attention to our message than if a regular protester had done it, as opposed to Larry David." Time recounted the on-air incident, with the magazine writing, "David, one of the world's richest comedians, told Trump that it was the money he was after. Asked by Trump during the bit why he shouted, David replied, 'I heard if I yelled that they'd give me $5,000.'" TheWrap reported David's agent was contacted for the reward but the Seinfeld creator had not responded and claimed it.

== Humanitarian and animal welfare work ==
=== Haiti orphanage ===
In 2006, Montgomery moved to Haiti and co-founded an AIDS orphanage for HIV+ children in the impoverished island nation.

=== Earthquake relief ===
In 2010, Montgomery raised funds and volunteered in Haiti with earthquake relief efforts. He was selected as one of The Advocate magazine's "40 Under 40" for his emergency Haiti earthquake relief work bringing food and medical supplies into the disaster zone.

=== Homeless pet adoption ===
Montgomery co-founded Adopt-a-Pet.com, the nation's largest non-profit pet adoption web service. The site helps leads to thousands of homeless pets being adopted each day. While as director of marketing for the site, Montgomery produced and directed "The Save-A-Pet Show" starring actress Drew Barrymore. In 2021, Adopt-a-pet.com was acquired by Kinship, a subsidiary of Mars, Inc.

=== Anti-fur ballot measure ===
In 1999, Montgomery was behind a ballot initiative to require all fur coats sold in Beverly Hills to carry a label describing how fur manufacturers put animals to death. The Los Angeles Times reported, "The tags, the size of a credit card, would read: 'Consumer notice: This product is made with fur from animals that may have been killed by electrocution, gassing, neck breaking, poisoning, clubbing, stomping or drowning and may have been trapped in steel-jaw, leg-hold traps.'" The effort garnered media coverage, with the New York Times writing, "The effort to win passage drew vast publicity." In addition to traditional media reporting, comedy shows also picked up on the novel concept including The Late Show with David Letterman and The Daily Show with Jon Stewart. The New York Times noted, "The proposal drew the backing of Hollywood stars." These included Beverly Hills residents Larry King and Jack Lemmon. The Los Angeles Times wrote, "Lemmon described the initiative as a 'fair, common-sense, simple concept.'" The New York Times reported that Lemmon, "sent a mailer to voters on his own stationery asking them to consider approving it."

The labeling effort gathered the necessary number of voter signatures to appear on the ballot, but was defeated in the election. The New York Times quoted Montgomery after the defeat of the ballot measure as saying, "We set out to educate a few consumers here in Beverly Hills about how fur animals are killed by clubbing and electrocution, but we succeeded in educating millions of people around the world. So if our intent was to educate people about these killing methods the fur industry uses, we certainly did our job."
