= Luke Parker =

Luke Parker may refer to:

- Luke Parker (cricketer) (born 1983), English cricketer
- Luke Parker (footballer) (born 1992), Australian rules footballer
- Luke Parker (cyclist) (born 1993), Australian cyclist
- Luke Parker, contestant on The Bachelorette (American season 15)
