= Luke Fox (disambiguation) =

Luke Fox may refer to:

- Luke Foxe, also known as Luke Fox, English explorer
- Luke Fox (judge), Irish judge
- Luke Fox (character), also known as Batwing, a DC Comics superhero
