= Luke Weaver (disambiguation) =

Luke Weaver (born 1993) is an American baseball player.

Luke Weaver may also refer to:

- Luke Weaver (footballer) (born 1979), English footballer
- Luke Weaver (American football) (born 2003 or 2004), American football quarterback

== See also ==
- Lake Weaver, a lake located in Florida
