= Luke Ford (disambiguation) =

Luke Ford (born 1981) is an Australian actor.

Luke Ford is also the name of:

- Luke Ford (blogger) (born 1966), Australian-born American writer.
- Luke Ford (rugby union) (born 1988), Welsh rugby union player
