= Luke Song =

American fashion designer

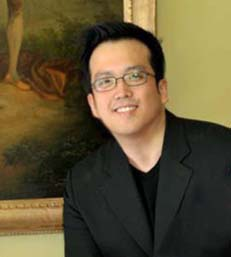
- Born: Seoul, South Korea
- Known for: Aretha Franklin's Hat for President Obama's Inauguration
- Label: Mr. Song Millinery
- Website: www.mrsongdesigns.com

Luke Song (Korean: 송욱; born December 1972) is an American contemporary high fashion milliner designer.

== Biography ==
Song was born in Seoul, the fifth generation of his family from the city. He grew up in Myeong-dong district. He moved to the Detroit suburbs in 1982 and graduated from Birmingham Seaholm High School. He first studied biochemistry, but eventually ended up studying fine arts at Parsons School of Design in New York City. Luke's artistic career lead him eventually to Paris, France, but he found the art of hat making during his journey back home to Michigan. He began his career as a milliner in 1997. He incorporated Moza Inc. in 1998.

Song has been also designing for many other fashion companies and designs products for the movies, television, books, magazines, and other venues. He collaborates with many artists around the world for gallery exhibitions and special exhibitions. He is working on six joint projects in Japan, France, South Korea and the United States.

== Mr. Song Millinery ==
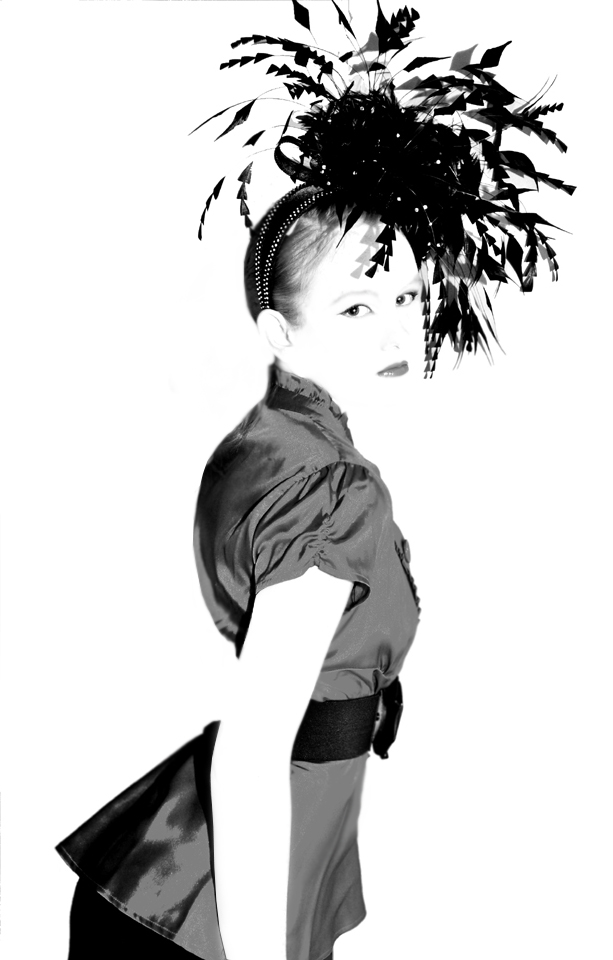
Model wearing Luke Song's 'Estrella' fascinator

The original showroom in Detroit was open until 2009.

Moza Inc. was incorporated in 1998 and with his label Mr. Song millinery and by the year 2000 there were in over 200 plus boutiques and stores. The hats are found in over 500 boutiques and stores around the world. The hats are worn by celebrities around the country among them being the "Queen of Soul", Aretha Franklin.

== The Inaugural Hat ==
Aretha Franklin wore one of Song's hats at the inauguration of Barack Obama. The now nicknamed "The Inaugural Hat" received worldwide media attention. In May, 2011 "The Inaugural Hat" was inducted into the Smithsonian Museum. An identical replica of the hat (the only other one in existence) is displayed at the Rock and Roll Hall of Fame in Cleveland, Ohio.

Mr Song Millinery is based in Southfield, Michigan, United States.

== Little America ==
In 2022, Song's life was the basis for "Mr. Song", the second-season premiere of the Apple TV+ anthology series Little America. Directed by Deepa Mehta, the episode was loosely based on Song's upbringing and path to becoming a fashion designer. Alan Kim portrayed Song as a child and Ki Hong Lee portrayed him as a young adult.
