= Luke Green =

Luke Green may refer to:

- Luke Green (soccer) (born 2002), Canadian soccer player
- Luke Green (ice hockey) (born 1998), Canadian ice hockey player
- Luke Green (rugby union) (born 2001), English rugby union player
