= Luke Jones =

Luke Jones may refer to:

- Luke Jones (footballer) (born 1987), English footballer
- Luke Jones (rugby union) (born 1991), Australian rugby union footballer
- Luke Jones (motorcyclist) (born 1989), British motorcycle racer
- Luke Jones (squash player) (born 1997), New Zealand squash player
