= Luke O'Reilly =

Luke O'Reilly may refer to:

- Luke O'Reilly (alpine skier), British former alpine skier
- Luke O'Reilly (Bel's Boys), Northern Irish actor and musician
- Luke O'Reilly (cricketer) (born 1977), cricketer
