= Luke McDonald =

Luke McDonald or MacDonald may refer to:

== People ==
- Luke Macdonald, musician, synth and guitar player in Cherry Glazerr
- Luke McDonald, musician, lead guitar player in Sunk Loto
- Luke McDonald (footballer) (born 1995), drafted to North Melbourne in 2013

== Fictional characters ==
- Luke McDonald (True Blood)
- Luke MacDonald, fictional character in El Dorado (1966 film)
- Luke MacDonald (fictional character), see List of Parker Lewis Can't Lose episodes
