= Sonny Pike =

English footballer (born 1983)

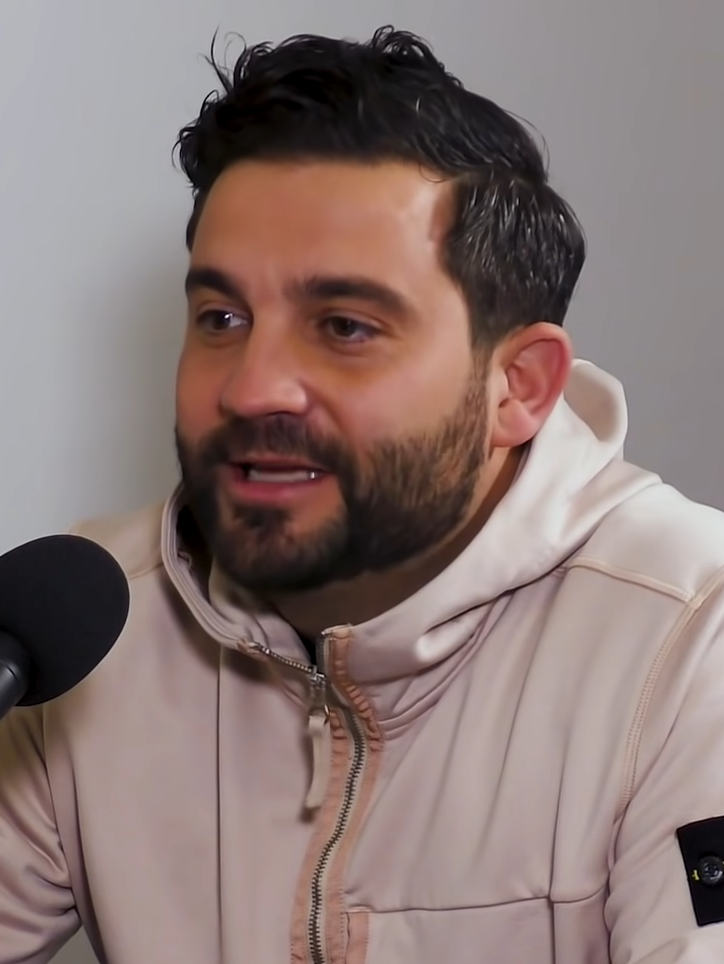
- Pike in 2022

Personal information
- Date of birth: 1983 (age 42–43)
- Place of birth: Enfield, England

Youth career
- Years: Team
- Enfield Colts
- Enfield
- 1996: Leyton Orient
- Stevenage Borough

Sonny Pike (born 1983) is an English former footballer who became famous at a young age for his talent, which saw him being compared to players regarded as among the greatest of all time, such as Diego Maradona and George Best. Despite his early promise, Pike left the match at the age of 18 without ever having played professionally.

== Early life and football career ==
Pike was born and raised in Enfield. He joined Enfield Colts at the age of six, moving to Enfield F.C. at the age of ten.

Pike received much publicity when he went on trial with Dutch club Ajax in 1995; though the club wanted to sign him, he returned to England to sign for Leyton Orient instead. During his time in the media spotlight, he featured in advertisements for Coca-Cola and McDonald's, attended awards ceremonies with leading footballers, and entertained the crowd before the 1996 Football League Cup final. He was due to move to Chelsea until he featured on a Channel 4 documentary titled Poaching & Coaching in May 1996, which made allegations of illegal payments and resulted in him being banned from representing any club for a year. He later went on trial with both Queens Park Rangers and Crystal Palace before signing with Stevenage Borough. He had a trial at Grimsby Town, before quitting football at the age of 18.

There were reports in the media that Pike had a non-league career at clubs such as Barnet and Waltham Forest under an assumed name, or was playing in Dundee, but he has denied those reports.

== Later career ==
In 2016 Pike was working as a taxi driver in London. In February 2020 he opened a football academy. He is married with two children. He continues to be cited by the football media as the archetype of a heavily promoted child prodigy who ultimately did not achieve success in the sport.
