= Luke Mitchell (disambiguation) =

Luke Mitchell is an Australian actor.

Luke Mitchell may also refer to:

- Luke Mitchell (footballer) (born 1992), Australian rules footballer
- Luke Mitchell, convicted murderer of Jodi Jones
