= Luke Matheson =

Luke Matheson may refer to:

- Luke Matheson (footballer) (born 2002), English footballer for Rochdale
- Luke Matheson (Ravenswood), character
