= Luke O'Connor (disambiguation) =

Luke O'Connor (1831–1915) was an Irish soldier.

Luke O'Connor may also refer to:

- Luke O'Connor (cricketer) (1844–1927), New Zealand cricketer
- Luke O'Connor (hurler) (born 2000), Irish hurler
- Luke Smythe O'Connor (1806–1873), British army officer
