= Luke Walker (disambiguation) =

Luke Walker may refer to:

- Luke Walker (born 1943), former pitcher in Major League Baseball
- Luke Walker (filmmaker), British film maker
- Luke Walker (ice hockey) (born 1990), American ice hockey forward
- Luke Walker, musician with The Summer Obsession
