= Norris Lake (Anoka County, Minnesota) =

Lake in the state of Minnesota, United States

- Location within Minnesota
- Location: Anoka County, Minnesota
- Coordinates: 45°22′44″N 93°23′25″W
- Type: lake

Norris Lake is a lake in Anoka County, Minnesota, in the United States.

Norris Lake was named for Grafton Norris.

== See also ==
- List of lakes in Minnesota
