= Luke Bell =

Luke Bell may refer to:

- Luke Bell (musician) (1990–2022), American country singer-songwriter
- Luke Bell (triathlete) (born 1979), Australian triathlete
- Luke Maximo Bell (born 1994), South African filmmaker
