= Luke Adams (potter) =

New Zealand potter

Luke Adams (21 May 1838 – 24 February 1918) was a potter in New Zealand. Born in Fareham, Hampshire, England, he migrated to Christchurch in 1873 to work at William Neighbours' brickworks. Later he founded Luke Adams Pottery with his sons.

Examples of his work are in the Museum of New Zealand Te Papa Tongarewa.
