= Richard Madox =

Richard Madox (11 November 1546 – 27 February 1583) was an English explorer, who served as a chaplain aboard Edward Fenton's voyage headed for the Moluccas and China in 1582. He died during the voyage, but left a diary which has been republished and is preserved in the British Museum.

== Biography ==
Madox was born on 11 November 1546 in Shropshire, one of three brothers. He initially attended Shrewsbury School and then became an undergraduate at All Souls College, Oxford University, when he was 20. After receiving his B.A., he was appointed a fellow of All Souls College, graduating with an MA in 1576. He was ordained as a priest five years later.

Madox, along with John Walker, was appointed to the position of chaplain on Edward Fenton's Galleon Leicester, which set sail on 1 May 1582. Fenton was intending to sail around the Cape of Good Hope to the Moluccas and China.

Madox died on the voyage, on 27 February 1583, while the vessel was near Vitória, Brazil.

== Diary ==
Madox started writing his diary, which is now preserved in the British Museum, on 1 January 1582. During the voyage on the Galleon Leicester, Madox resorted to writing in a cipher, and then in Latin and Greek, in order to ensure his diary remained secret.

As well as recording events on board, his diary during the voyage described various examples of flora and fauna which he encountered. He also included illustrations.

The last entry in Madox's diary, a comment on the weather, was written on 31 December 1582.

His diary was published by the Hakluyt Society in 1976, edited by Elizabeth Story Donno, under the title An Elizabethan in 1582: The Diary of Richard Madox, Fellow of All Souls.
