= Luke White =

Luke White may refer to:

- Luke White (died 1824) (1740–1824), Irish MP for Leitrim
- Luke White (of Rathcline) (a. 1789 – 1854), son of the above, Irish MP for County Longford
- Luke White, 2nd Baron Annaly (1829–1888), Liberal MP for Clare 1859–1860, Longford 1861–1862
- Luke White, 5th Baron Annaly (1927–1990), English peer and cricketer
- Luke White, 6th Baron Annaly (born 1954), British Army officer and Conservative politician
- Luke White (English politician) (1845–1920), Liberal MP for Buckrose 1900–1918
- Luke White (rugby union) (born 1991), American rugby union player
- Luke Batt a.k.a. Luke White, son of Mike Batt and co-producer of Ketevan
