= Luke Young =

Luke Young may refer to:

- Luke Young (footballer, born 1979), English football defender
- Luke Young (footballer, born 1993), English football midfielder
- Luke Young (rugby league) (born 1980), Australian rugby league player
- Luke Young (canoeist) (born 1978), Australian kayak Olympian
