= Luke Strong =

Luke Strong may refer to:

- Luke Strong (Coronation Street), a character in the British television soap opera Coronation Street
- Luke Strong (gymnast) (born 1993), British trampoline gymnast
