= Luke Stricklin =

- Born: December 21, 1982 (age 42)
- Origin: Arkadelphia, Arkansas
- Genres: Country
- Occupation: Singer
- Instrument: vocals
- Years active: 2005–2006
- Labels: Pacific-Time

Luke Stricklin (born December 21, 1982) is an American country music singer and songwriter.

He is from Arkadelphia, Arkansas, and learned to play piano and drums as a teenager. After the September 11 attacks, Stricklin joined the Army National Guard, and was deployed to Iraq.

In 2005, Stricklin released the single "American by God's Amazing Grace," which he originally wrote and recorded in Baghdad, Iraq with J.R. Schultz. It tells of their experiences fighting in the Iraq War.

== Discography ==
=== Albums ===
Title	Album details	Peak positions
Title	Album details	US Country
American by God's Amazing Grace	Release date: September 27, 2005; Label: Pacific-Time Records	64

=== Singles ===
Year	Single	Peak positions	Album
Year	Single	US Country	Album
2005	"American by God's Amazing Grace"	50	American by God's Amazing Grace
2006	"Does That Make Me Bad"	—	American by God's Amazing Grace
"—" denotes releases that did not chart

=== Music videos ===
Year	Video
2005	"American by God's Amazing Grace"
