= Luke Wright (disambiguation) =

Luke Wright (born 1985) is an English cricketer.

Luke Wright may also refer to:

- Luke Wright (poet) (born 1982), British poet
- Luke Edward Wright (1846–1922), American politician
