= Luke Evans (disambiguation) =

Luke Evans (born 1979) is a Welsh actor and singer.

Luke Evans may also refer to:

- Luke Evans (politician) (born 1983), British politician
- Luke Evans (cricketer) (born 1987), English cricketer
- Luke Evans (rugby union) (born 1988), Australian rugby union player

== See also ==
- Luc Evans (born 1971), Welsh rugby union international
