= Luke Davies (disambiguation) =

Luke Davies (born 1962) is an Australian poet.

Luke Davies may also refer to:

- Luke Davies (flight attendant), an Australian flight attendant for Qantas who, along with his partner Jesse Baird, were both murdered on 19 February 2024.
- Luke Davies (rugby union) (born 2002), Welsh rugby union footballer
- Luke Davies-Uniacke (born 1999), Australian rules footballer
