= Luke Holmes =

Luke Holmes may refer to:

- Luke Holmes (rugby union, born 1868) (1868–1939), Ireland international rugby union player
- Luke Holmes (rugby union, born 1983), Australian professional rugby union player
- Luke Holmes (footballer) (born 1990), English association footballer
