= Luke Kirby (disambiguation) =

Luke Kirby (born 1978) is a Canadian actor.

Luke Kirby may also refer to:

- Luke Kirby (priest) (c. 1549–1582)
- Luke Kirby (comics), 2000 AD character
- Luke Kirby, character in Mason of the Mounted
