= Luke Farrell =

Luke Farrell may refer to:

- Luke Farrell (baseball) (born 1991), American baseball pitcher
- Luke Farrell (American football) (born 1997), American football tight end
- Luke Farrell (chef), British chef and restaurateur
