= Luke Boyd (disambiguation) =

Luke Boyd may refer to:

- Luke Boyd (born 1987), Australian boxer
- Classified (rapper) (born 1977), Canadian rapper born Luke Boyd
- Luke James (singer) (born 1984), American singer born Luke James Boyd
