= Luke Scott =

Luke Scott may refer to:

- Luke Scott (baseball) (born 1978), American baseball player
- Luke Scott (director) (born 1968), English film director
- Luke Scott (rugby league) (born 1974), Australian rugby league player
