= Luke Murphy =

Luke Murphy may refer to:

- Luke Murphy (baseball) (born 1999), American baseball player
- Luke Murphy (English footballer) (born 1989), English footballer
- Luke Murphy (Gaelic footballer) (born 2002), Irish Gaelic footballer
- Luke Murphy (politician), British politician
