= Luke Nelson =

Luke Nelson may refer to:

- Luke Nelson (baseball) (1893–1985), American baseball player
- Luke Nelson (basketball) (born 1995), British basketball player
- Luke Nelson (ski mountaineer) (born 1980), American ski mountaineer
