= Luke Hutton =

English highwayman and writer

Luke Hutton (died 1598) was an English criminal and reputed author.

== Identity ==
Luke Hutton is stated by Sir John Harington to have been a younger son of Matthew Hutton, Archbishop of York; but Thomas Fuller, whose account is adopted by Ralph Thoresby and William Hutchinson, asserts, with more probability, that he was the son of Robert Hutton, Rector of Houghton-le-Spring and Prebendary of Durham.

== Life ==
Luke Hutton matriculated as a sizar of Trinity College, Cambridge, in October 1582; left the University without a degree, and took to evil courses. He was 'so valiant that he feared not men nor Laws'. In 1598, for a robbery committed on St. Luke's Day, he was executed at York, the Archbishop magnanimously forbearing to intercede on his behalf.

== Works ==
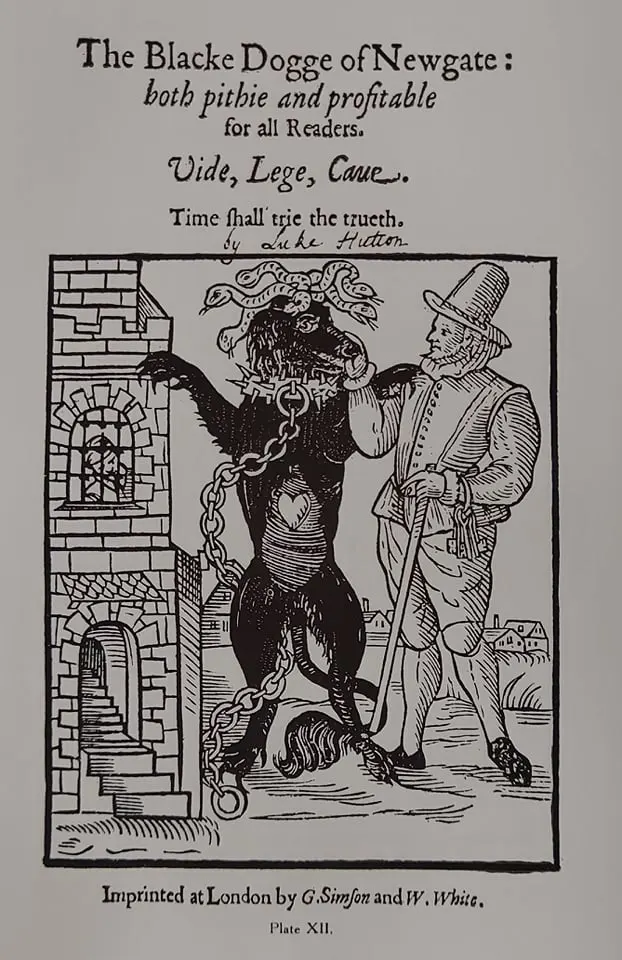
The Black Dogge of Newgate: both pithie and profitable for all Readers (c. 1596)

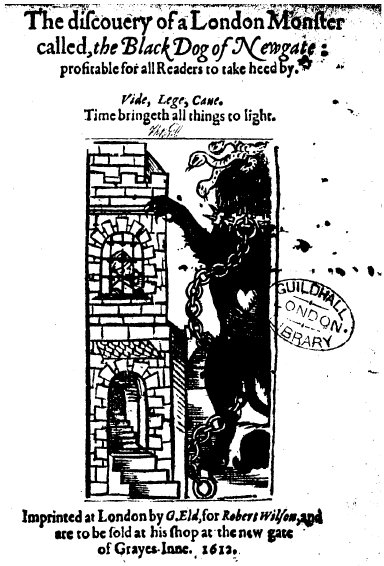
The Discovery of a London Monster, called The Blacke Dogg of New-gate (1612)

He is the reputed author of:

- Luke Button's Repentance, a manuscript poem dedicated to Henry, Earl of Huntingdon.
- The Black Dogge of Newgate, both pithie and profitable for all readers, black letter, n.d., 4to, dedicated to Lord-Chief-Justice Popham; reprinted with additional matter in 1638. From a passage in the preface we learn that the Repentance had been printed. In the first edition the tract begins with a poem describing a vision that appeared to the author in Newgate. The poem, which treats of the harshness of gaolers and miseries of prison-life, is followed by a prose Dialogue betwixt the Author and one Zawney, concerning 'coneycatching'.
- A lost play bearing the title The Black Dog of Newgate, 2 parts, by Hathway, Wentworth Smith, and Day, was produced in 1602.
- After Hutton's execution appeared a broadside ballad, Luke Hutton's Lamentation which he wrote the day before his death [1598].
- The discovery of a London monster (1638).

== See also ==
- The Black Dog of Newgate

== Sources ==
- Fuller, Thomas (1845). The Church History of Britain, ed. J. S. Brewer. Vol. 5. Oxford: At the University Press. p. 356.
- Harington, John (1653). A Briefe View of the State of the Church of England. London: Jos. Kirton. p. 192.
- Hutchinson, William (1785). The History and Antiquities of the County Palatine of Durham. Vol. 1. Newcastle: Printed for S. Hodgson & Robinsons. p. 470.
- Judges, A. V. (1965). The Elizabethan Underworld. 2nd ed. London: Routledge & Kegan Paul Ltd. pp. lxiii–lxiv, 265–95, 439, 503, 506–8.
- Shrank, Cathy (2004). "Hutton, Luke (d. 1598), highwayman and writer". In Oxford Dictionary of National Biography. Oxford University Press. Retrieved 8 August 2022.
- Thoresby, Robert (1724). Vicaria Leodiensis, or, The History of the Church of Leedes in Yorkshire. London: Printed for Joseph Smith.
- Henslowe, Philip (1904). Henslowe's Diary, ed. Walter W. Greg. London: A. H. Bullen. pp. 185, 187, 188.
- Musæum Thoresbyanum, a catalogue of the collection of Ralph Thoresby [1764].

Attribution:
