= Luke Perry (disambiguation) =

Luke Perry (1966–2019) was an American actor.

Luke Perry may also refer to:

- Luke Perry (artist) (born 1983), English artist
- Luke Perry (volleyball) (born 1995), Australian volleyball player

== See also ==
- Luke Berry (born 1992), an English professional footballer
