= Luke Drury =

Luke Drury may refer to:

- Luke Drury (astrophysicist) (born 1953), Irish mathematician and astrophysicist at the Dublin Institute for Advanced Studies
- Luke Drury (judge) (17__–18__), Justice of the Rhode Island Supreme Court from 1822 to 1824
