= Luke Dean =

Luke Dean is the name of:

- Luke Dean (footballer, born 1913), English professional footballer who played for Port Vale
- Luke Dean (footballer, born 1991), English professional footballer who plays for Harrogate Town
- Luke Dean (DJ), English DJ and producer
