= Luke Francis =

Welsh rally driver

- Born: 1989 (age 36–37); Wales
- Occupation: Rally driver
- Parent: Mark Francis

Luke Francis is a Welsh rally driver in the BTRDA Forest Rally from Rhuddlan, Denbighshire. He is the third generation of a racing family, following his father and grandfather.

== Career ==
In 2012 and 2016, Francis was the BTRDA champion.

In 2016, Francis won the first rally of the new season, the Cambrian Rally, moved from its usual October slot to February. In the 2015 season, he had the second most stage wins of any other competitor.

Francis drives a Mitsubishi Lancer Evo IX. He also drove in the 2013 Wales Rally GB, his first time in the World Rally Championship but failed to finish.

Francis is co-driven by John H. Roberts.
