= Luke Muyawa =

Malawian footballer

Personal information
- Date of birth: 20 December 1989 (age 36)
- Place of birth: Zomba, Malawi
- Height: 1.78 m (5 ft 10 in)
- Position: Midfielder

Senior career*
Years	Team	Apps	(Gls)
2009–2014	Eagle Strikers		
2015–2016	Moyale Barracks		

International career^{‡}
2010	Malawi	1	(0)
- * Club domestic league appearances and goals as of 7 August 2021 ‡ National team caps and goals as of 7 August 2021

Luke Muyawa (born 20 December 1989) is a retired Malawian football midfielder.
