= Luke Kelly (disambiguation) =

Luke Kelly (1940–1984) was an Irish folk singer.

Luke Kelly may also refer to:

- Luke Kelly (American football) (1888–1952), American football player
- Luke Kelly (rugby league) (born 1989), Australian rugby league footballer
