= Luke Bailey =

Luke Bailey may refer to:

- Luke Bailey (actor) (born 1984), British actor
- Luke Bailey (rugby league) (born 1980), Australian rugby league international player
- Luke Bailey (wheelchair racer) (born 1997), Australian Paralympian
