= Luke Ukara Onyeani =

Nigerian politician

Luke Ukara Onyeani is a Nigerian politician who is a former member of the 6th Abia State House of Assembly, representing the Arochukwu constituency.
