= Edward Fenton =

16th-century English navigator

Edward Fenton (died 1603) was an English navigator, son of Henry Fenton and Cicely Beaumont and brother of Sir Geoffrey Fenton. He was also a publisher of diaries and journals.

== Biography ==
He was a native of Sturton-le-Steeple, Nottinghamshire. His mother belonged to a prominent Leicestershire family whose seat was at Coleorton Hall. In 1577, he sailed, in command of the Gabriel, with Sir Martin Frobisher's second expedition for the discovery of the Northwest Passage, and in the following year, he took part as second in command in Frobisher's third expedition, his ship being the Judith.

He was then employed in Ireland for a time, but in 1582, he was put in charge of an expedition which was to sail round the Cape of Good Hope to the Moluccas and China, his instructions being to obtain any knowledge of the northwest passage that was possible without hindrance to his trade. For this voyage, he was in charge of two warships, the Galleon Leicester and the Edward Bonaventure. On this unsuccessful voyage, he got no further than Portuguese Brazil, and although defeating a Spanish fleet just off São Vicente he was unable to trade with the Portuguese residents there. To add to his woes, he was engaged in quarrelling with his officers, and especially with his lieutenant, William Hawkins, the nephew of Sir John Hawkins, whom he had in irons when he arrived back in the Thames. Richard Madox, who sailed as chaplain, kept a diary of the voyage for the whole year in 1582 which has been published.

In 1588, he had command of the Mary Rose, (not the preserved vessel), one of the ships of the fleet that was formed to oppose the Spanish Armada. He died 15 years afterwards, and was buried in St Nicholas's Church in Deptford.

== Personal life ==
Edward Fenton was married to Thomasina, daughter of Benjamin Gonson the Elder, and was brother-in-law to Sir John Hawkins, who married Katherine Gonson, Thomasina's sister. The mother of the girls, wife of Benjamin, was Ursula, daughter of Anthony Hussey.
