= Luke Warde =

- Born: c. 1550
- Died: c.1592
- Military career
- Allegiance: England
- Branch: Navy Royal
- Commands: HMS Bonaventure; HMS Tramontana; HMS Swallow; Admiral of the Narrow Seas

Admiral Luke Warde (fl. 1588), was an English naval officer who served during the Tudor period.

== Career ==
Warde was with (Sir) Martin Frobisher in his first and second voyages to the north-west, 1576–77. In April 1578 he is mentioned as having brought into Southampton a quantity of goods taken from pirates. In May 1578 he sailed again with Frobisher in his third voyage, being received as an adventurer ‘gratis,’ in consideration of his service. Luke Sound marks a place at which he landed. In December 1581 he was engaged in fitting out HMS Bonaventure, in which in 1582–83 he was vice-admiral under Edward Fenton in the expedition for China, which did not get further than the coast of Brazil during which a Spanish fleet which was sent out to intercept them was defeated at São Vicente. Warde afterwards wrote the account of the voyage which was published by Richard Hakluyt. In 1587–1589 he commanded the queen's ship HMS Tramontana against the Spanish Armada and in the narrow seas. In 1590, still commanding Tramontana, he was appointed Admiral of the Narrow Seas In 1591 whilst still in his post he changed his flagship to HMS Swallow. His name does not occur in the accounts of any of the numerous expeditions during the rest of the war, so that it is probable that he died shortly after 1591.
