= Luke O'Neil =

American journalist, author, and musician

Luke O'Neil is an American journalist, author, and musician who writes about American dystopia in the New Journalism style. He rose to prominence in the 2000s with articles in smaller metro-Boston publications like the DigBoston and The Improper Bostonian, before gaining readership nationally at Slate, Boston magazine, Esquire, and The New York Times.

O'Neil's 2016 interview with the professional football player Tom Brady was direct and personal, eliciting many emotions and opinions, when Brady's image and reputation was in flux.
