= Luke Norris =

Luke Norris may refer to:

- Luke Norris (footballer)
- Luke Norris (actor)
