= Luke Whitlatch =

American painter and musician

Luke Whitlatch (born 1977, Casper, Wyoming) is an American, Asheville, North Carolina–based, artist. His paintings have been shown in Los Angeles, New York City, and Wyoming. His work has been reviewed in Modern Painters and the Columbia Art and Literature Review.

Whitlatch grew up in Wyoming before moving to Los Angeles to study art at Otis College of Art and Design, where he received a BFA in 2001.

== Selected solo exhibitions ==
- 2021 "Do you call day night?" solo show, Tracey Morgan Gallery Asheville, North Carolina
- 2018 “Here lies the void I once knew” solo show, Scarlow's Gallery Casper, Wyoming
- 2013 “Hand of the Slumber Man,” solo show, Richard Heller Gallery, Santa Monica, California
- 2010 “Ghost in the cargo van,” solo show, Corridor Gallery, Casper, Wyoming
- 2008 “The Goodstein Incidents,” solo show, Bandini Art, Culver City, California
- 2004 “The Confines of Expressionism,” solo show, Timbrespace, Los Angeles, California

== Selected group exhibitions ==
- 2019 "A Consuming Fire (with Eric Anderson); Keystone Gallery, Los Angeles, California
- 2018 “It’s OK,” group show, Charlie James Gallery Los Angeles, California, Curated by Sacha Baumann
- 2014 "6018 Wilshire Blvd." group show, Edward Cella Gallery Los Angeles, California, Curated by Carl Berg
