= Cynthia =

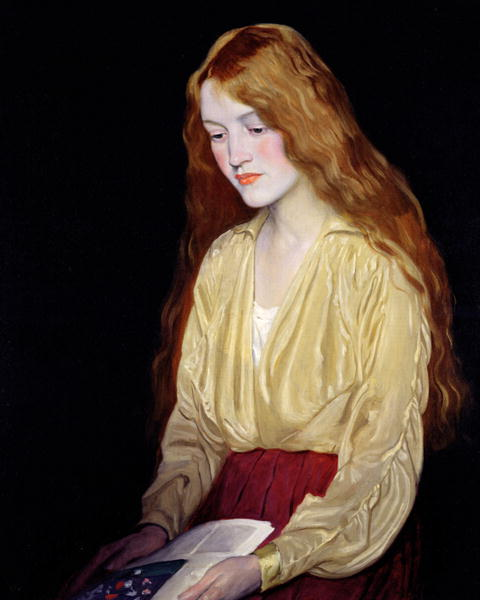
- Cynthia, a 1917 portrait by William Strang.
- Pronunciation: English: /ˈsɪnθiːə/
- Gender: Female

Origin
- Origin: Greek
- Meaning: “From Mount Cynthus”

Other names
- Related names: Cindy, Cyn, Cyndi, Cyndy, Cindi, Cinthia, Cintia, Cinta, Cinzia, Cyndia, Cynthya, Cinny, Cinthya

Cynthia is a feminine given name. It is often thought to be of Greek origin (Ancient Greek: Κυνθία, romanized: Kynthía, lit. 'from Mount Cynthus', on the island of Delos), but words and names with "inth" are actually Pre-Greek names belonging to another language family, before the Indo-European migrations. The name has been in use in the Anglosphere since the 17th century. There are various spellings for this name, and it can be abbreviated to Cindy, Cyndi, Cyndy, Cinny, or occasionally to Thea, Tia, or Thia.

Cynthia was originally an epithet of the Greek goddess Artemis, who according to legend was born on Mount Cynthus on Delos. Selene, the Greek personification of the moon, and the Roman Diana were also sometimes called "Cynthia" due to their association with Artemis. In Ancient Roman literature, 'Cynthia' is the name of Propertius' love.

== Usage ==
It has ranked among the 1,000 most used names for girls in the United States since 1880 and among the top 100 names between 1945 and 1993. It peaked in usage between 1956 and 1963, when it was among the 10 most popular names for American girls. It has since declined in use in the United States and ranked in 806th position on the popularity chart there in 2021. It was also among the top 100 names in use for girls in Canada between 1949 and 1978, among the top 100 names in use for girls in the United Kingdom between 1934 and 1944 among the top 500 names in France for girls between 1970 and 2008, and among the top 500 names in Spain between 1980 and 2010.

== People ==
- Amy Elizabeth Thorpe (1910–1963), Anglo-American spy codenamed "Cynthia"
- Cinthia Zermeño Moore, American politician
- Cintia Dicker (born 1986), Brazilian model and actress
- Cyndi Lauper (born Cynthia Ann Stephanie Lauper, 1953), American singer, songwriter, and actress
- Cynthia (born Cynthia Torres, 1968), Puerto Rican-American freestyle- and dance-pop singer
- Cynthia or Cindy Bishop (born 1978), Thai model, actress, TV personality, and entrepreneur
- Cynthia or Cindy Bremser (born 1953), American runner
- Cynthia or Cindy Greiner (born 1957), American retired heptathlete and long jumper
- Cynthia, Christian name of Saori Minami (born 1954), Japanese retired J-pop singer-songwriter
- Lady Cynthia Asquith (1887–1960), English writer and socialite
- Lady Cynthia Colville (1884–1968), English courtier and social worker
- Lady Cynthia Mosley (1898–1933), English aristocrat, politician, and first wife of politician Sir Oswald Mosley
- Cynthia Abcug, American woman arrested for kidnapping
- Cynthia Adinig (born 1985), African-American healthcare equity activist
- Cynthia Adobea (born 1990), Ghanaian footballer
- Cynthia Ahearn (1952–2008), American echinodermologist and museum specialist
- Cynthia Aku (born 1999), Nigerian professional footballer
- Cynthia Akuetteh (born 1948), American diplomat
- Cynthia Alexander (born 1971), Filipino singer-songwriter and multi-instrumentalist
- Cinthia de Allyson (born 1996), Brazilian politician
- Cynthia Almond (born 1964/1965), American attorney and politician
- Cynthia Amuzu (born 1965), Ghanaian former badminton player
- Cynthia Appiah (born 1990), Canadian bobsledder
- Cynthia Armour Coyne (born 1961), American politician
- Cynthia Arrieu-King, American poet
- Cynthia Ashperger (born 1963), Croatian-Canadian film-, television-, and stage actress
- Cynthia Astwood (born 1946), British former governor of the Turks and Caicos Islands
- Cynthia Atman, American industrial engineer
- Cynthia Bah-Traore (born 1981), American missing woman
- Cynthia Bailey (born 1967), American model, reality television personality, podcaster, and actress
- Cynthia Baldwin (born 1945), American jurist and former Supreme Court justice
- Cynthia Ball, American politician
- Cynthia Banham (born 1972), Australian journalist and academic
- Cynthia Barboza (born 1987), American retired volleyball player
- Cynthia Barker (1962–2020), Filipino-born English politician and mayor
- Cynthia Barnes-Boyd (1953–2017), American academic administrator, professor, and nurse
- Cynthia Barnett, American author and journalist
- Cynthia Barnhart (born 1959), American civil engineer and academic
- Cynthia Baron, American film scholar and professor of theatre and film studies
- Cynthia Bashant (born 1960), American chief district judge
- Cynthia Basinet, American actress and singer
- Cynthia Bathurst, American mathematician and animal welfare advocate
- Cynthia Bauerle, American molecular biologist and college administrator
- Cynthia L. Bauerly (born 1970), American civil servant
- Cynthia Baum, American clinical psychologist and academic administrator
- Cynthia Beall (born 1949), American physical anthropologist and university professor
- Cynthia Beath (born 1944), American economist and professor emerita
- Cynthia Beck, American businesswoman
- Cynthia J. Becker (born 1957), American former Superior Court Judge
- Cynthia Beekhuis (born 1990), Dutch footballer
- Cynthia D. Belar, American scientist and professor emerita of clinical psychology
- Cynthia Holmes Belcher (1827–1911), American journalist
- Cynthia Belliveau (born 1963), Canadian former actress
- Cynthia Bendlin, Paraguayan activist who opposes human trafficking
- Cynthia Bergstrom, American costume designer
- Cynthia Bickley-Green, American painter
- Cynthia Biggs, American songwriter, producer, publisher, and vocalist
- Cynthia Bir, American professor of biomedical engineering
- Cynthia Block, Canadian politician and mayor, and former news anchor and journalist
- Cynthia Bolbach (1947–2012), American lawyer and Presbyterian moderator
- Cynthia Bolingo (born 1993), Belgian sprinter
- Cynthia Bolshaw, British murder victim
- Cynthia Bond (born 1961), American author and actress
- Cynthia Borrego, American politician
- Cynthia Bouron (1934–1973), American showgirl and actress
- Cynthia Bower (born 1955), English social worker
- Cynthia Brants (1924–2006), American artist
- Cynthia Breazeal (born 1967), American AI- and robotics scientist and entrepreneur
- Cynthia Brewer (born 1960), American cartographer, author, and professor of geography
- Cynthia Brimhall (born 1964), American model and B-film actress
- Cynthia Bringle (born 1939), American potter
- Cynthia Brock-Smith, American government official
- Cynthia Brooke, Viscountess Brookeborough (1897–1970), British peeress
- Cynthia Brown, several people
- Cynthia Browning, American politician
- Cynthia M. Bulik (born 1960), American psychologist and author
- Cynthia Burek, British professor of geoconservation
- Cynthia S. Burnett (1840–1932), American educator, temperance reformer, and newspaper editor
- Cynthia Burrows, American chemist and professor
- Cynthia Butare, Rwandan-Swiss filmmaker and videographer
- Cynthia Hilda Evelyn Cadogan, English wife of racehorse owner Sir Humphrey de Trafford, 4th Baronet
- Cynthia Calderón (born 1988), Peruvian model and beauty pageant titleholder
- Cynthia Calvillo (born 1987), American retired mixed martial artist
- Cynthia Cameron (born 1980), Australian taekwondo practitioner
- Cynthia Flynn Capers (born 1945), American nurse, educator, researcher, and administrator
- Cynthia Carlson (born 1942), American visual artist
- Cynthia Carnes, American pharmacologist and academic administrator
- Cynthia Carr, American writer
- Cynthia Carrion (born 1948), Filipino sports executive and government official
- Cynthia Carroll (born 1956), American businesswoman
- Cynthia Carter (born 1959), British media academic
- Cynthia Cary (1884–1966), British-American socialite and art collector
- Cynthia Cattell, American space plasma physicist and professor
- Cynthia Chaerunnisa, Indonesian founder of coffeehouse chain Kopi Kenangan
- Cynthia Chafian, American subpoena in the January 6th Committee
- Cynthia Chalk (1913–2018), Canadian photographer
- Cynthia Chan (born 1968), Filipino politician and mayor
- Cynthia Chapple, American research chemist and non-profit executive
- Cynthia Chase (born 1943), American politician
- Cynthia Chepkirui (born 2008), Kenyan long-distance- and cross county runner
- Cynthia Chestek, American biomedical engineer and associate professor of bioengineering and neuroscience
- Cynthia Chestnut, American politician
- Cynthia Chigwenya (born 1996), Zimbabwean political researcher and pracademic
- Cynthia Chin-Lee (born 1958), American children's book author
- Cynthia Choi, American founder of nonprofit organization Stop AAPI Hate
- Cynthia Chua (born 1972), Singaporean businesswoman
- Cynthia Ann Cichorski, birth name of Cindy Morgan (1951–2023), American actress
- Cynthia Cidre (born 1957), American screenwriter and producer
- Cynthia Clarey (born 1949), American operatic singer and educator
- Cynthia Clark (born 1942), American statistician
- Cynthia Clawson (born 1948), American gospel singer
- Cynthia Cleese (born 1971), English daughter of actor, comedian, screenwriter, producer, and presenter John Cleese
- Cynthia Eloise Cleveland (1845–1932), American lawyer, politician, writer, and temperance worker
- Cynthia Clopper, American linguist and professor
- Cynthia Cloud (born 1969), American former politician
- Cynthia Cockburn (1934–2019), British academic, feminist, and peace activist
- Cynthia Coffman, several people
- Cynthia Beverley Washington Coleman (1832–1908), American preservationist and writer
- Cynthia Comacchio, Canadian historian and professor emerita
- Cynthia Connolly (born 1976), American photographer, curator, graphic designer, and artist
- Cynthia Cooke (1919–2016), British military nurse and nursing administrator during World War II
- Cynthia Cooley (born 1931), American artist
- Cynthia Cooper, several people
- Cynthia Coull (born 1965), Canadian former figure skater
- Cynthia Course (born 1990), Seychellois badminton player
- Cynthia Crane (born 1936), American jazz- and cabaret singer
- Cynthia Cranz, American voice actress
- Cynthia Ann Crawford (born 1966), American model, actress, and businesswoman
- Cynthia Crawford, British former personal assistant to stateswoman Margaret Thatcher
- Cynthia Stone Creem (born 1942), American politician
- Cynthia Crossen (born 1951), American author, journalist, and editor
- Cynthia Cruz, American contemporary poetess and academic
- Cynthia Culpeper (1962–2005), American Jewish rabbi
- Cynthia J. Curry, American emerita professor of pediatrics
- Cynthia Yih Shih, birth name of Vienna Teng (born 1978), American pianist and singer-songwriter
- Cynthia Cypert, American actress and stunt performer
- Cynthia Daignault (born 1978), American painter
- Cynthia Dale (born 1960), Canadian television actress and stage performer
- Cynthia Dall (1971–2012), American lo-fi musician and photographer
- Cynthia Damon (born 1957), American professor of classical studies
- Cynthia Daniel (born 1976), American photographer and former actress
- Cynthia Darlow, American actress
- Cynthia Davis (born 1959), American politician
- Cynthia de la Vega (born 1991), Mexican model and beauty queen
- Cynthia de las Fuentes (born 1964), American counseling psychologist
- Cynthia DeFelice (1951–2024), American children's writer
- Cynthia del Águila (born 1959), Guatemalan teacher and politician
- Cynthia Denzler (born 1983), Columbian-American-Swiss alpine skier
- Cynthia Dill (born 1965), American lawyer and politician
- Cynthia Djohore (born 1987), Ivorian professional footballer
- Cynthia Dobrinski (1950–2021), American handbell composer and arranger
- Cynthia Doerner (born 1951), Australian international tennis player and coach
- Cynthia Doll, American drag performer
- Cynthia Dunbar (born 1964), American political candidate and Evangelical writer
- Cynthia E. Dunbar, American scientist and hematologist
- Cynthia Dunsford (born 1962), Canadian politician
- Cynthia Duque (born 1992), Mexican beauty pageant titleholder
- Cynthia Dwork (born 1958), American computer scientist
- Cynthia Eager (1936–1996), Hong Kong swimmer
- Cynthia Ebinger, American geoscientist
- Cynthia Eckert (born 1965), American rower
- Cynthia Efird (born 1950), American diplomat and career foreign service officer
- Cynthia Elbaum (1966–1994), American photojournalist killed in a bombing raid
- Cynthia Eller, American author
- Cynthia Enloe (born 1938), American political theorist, feminist writer, and professor
- Cynthia Fuchs Epstein, American sociologist and professor emerita
- Cynthia Erivo (born 1987), English actress and singer
- Cynthia Estlund (born 1957), American professor of law
- Cynthia Ettinger, American character actress
- Cynthia Falabella (born 1972), Brazilian actress
- Cynthia Farah (born 1949), American photographer and writer
- Cynthia Farrar (1795–1862), American Christian missionary in India
- Cynthia Felgate (1935–1991), British television producer
- Cynthia Felice (born 1942), American science fiction writer
- Cynthia Feliks, Canadian murder victim
- Cynthia Finelli, American engineering educator
- Cynthia Fisher (born 1961), American businesswoman and public policy advocate
- Cynthia Flood (born 1940), Canadian short-story writer and novelist
- Cynthia Folio (born 1954), American composer, flutist, music theorist, and professor of music studies
- Cynthia Y. Forde (born 1952), Barbadian politician
- Cynthia M. Fornelli, American business leader and former securities lawyer
- Cynthia Fraser (1934–2020), South African political activist
- Cynthia Freeland (born 1951), American philosopher of art and emeritus professor of philosophy
- Cynthia Freeman (1915–1988), American romance novelist
- Cynthia Frelund (born 1982), American television sports analyst and writer
- Cynthia Ross Friedman (1970/1971–2018), Canadian professor of biological sciences
- Cynthia Friend, American chemist
- Cynthia Frisina, American chief executive and activist
- Cynthia Furse (born 1963), American electrical engineer, and university professor and director of graduate studies
- Cynthia Gairy (1923–2018), Grenadan politician
- Cynthia Gallagher (born 1951), American artist and assistant professor
- Cynthia García Coll, American-born Puerto Rican developmental psychologist, former journal editor-in-chief, and adjunct professor
- Cynthia Gardner, American geologist and volcanologist
- Cynthia Garrison, American past member of female vocal group The Three Degrees
- Cynthia Joan Gastelle (1961–1980), American murder victim
- Cynthia Geary (born 1965), American actress
- Cynthia Gellibert, Ecuadorian politician
- Cynthia Germanotta (born 1954), American philanthropist, activist, and entrepreneur
- Cynthia Farrelly Gesner, American film actress and entertainment lawyer
- Cynthia Gibb (born 1963), American actress and former model
- Cynthia Girard-Renard (born 1969), Canadian artist and poet
- Cynthia Glassman, American economist
- Cynthia Goh (1949–2022), Hong Kong-born Singaporean pioneer of palliative care
- Cynthia Gómez (born 1958), American psychologist
- Cynthia González (born 1992), Mexican badminton player
- Cynthia Gooding (1924–1988), American folk singer and musicologist
- Cynthia Goodwin (born 1952), American retired slalom canoeist
- Cynthia Roberts Gorton (1826–1894), American blind poet and author
- Cynthia Gouw (born 1963), American actress, model, and TV news anchor and host
- Cynthia Goyette (born 1946), American former Olympic swimmer and former world record-holder
- Cynthia Grant, several people
- Cynthia Green (born 1960), Jamaican sprinter
- Cynthia Gregory (born 1946), American former prima ballerina
- Cynthia M. Grund (born 1956), American philosopher, educator, and professor
- Cynthia Guiani (born 1964/1965), Filipino politician and lawyer
- Cynthia Hall, several people
- Cynthia Hamilton (born 2004), Australian AFLW player
- Cynthia Hampton, American woman who had an affair with veterinarian and former politician John Ensign
- Cynthia Hargrave (1957–2021), American film producer and screenwriter
- Cynthia Harnett (1893–1981), English author and illustrator
- Cynthia Harris (1934–2021), American film-, television-, and stage actress
- Cynthia Harrison (born 1946), American historian and activist
- Cynthia Harriss, American retail- and tourism industry executive
- Cynthia Harrod-Eagles (born 1948), English writer of historical-, romance-, and mystery novels
- Cynthia Fierro Harvey (born 1959), American Methodist bishop
- Cynthia Harvey, American former ballet dancer, ballet mistress, and educator
- Cynthia Haseloff (born 1948), American author of western novels
- Cynthia Haven, American literary scholar, author, critic, Slavicist, and journalist
- Cynthia Hawkins (born 1950), American painter and sculptor
- Cynthia Haymon (born 1958), American soprano
- Cynthia Hedge-Morrell (born 1947), American teacher, former school administrator, and politician
- Cynthia Heimel (1947–2018), American feminist humorist writer
- Cynthia Hendy, American girlfriend of criminal David Parker Ray
- Cynthia Herrup, American professor and historian of early modern British law
- Cynthia Hesdra (1808–1879), African-American slave and businesswoman
- Cynthia Hill, several people
- Cynthia Jean Hinds (?–1982), American murder victim
- Cynthia Hiner (born 1970), American politician
- Cynthia Hipwell, American nanotechnologist and tribologist
- Cynthia Hogan (born 1958), American attorney and political advisor
- Cynthia Hogue (born 1951), American poet, translator, critic, and professor
- Cynthia Holz (born 1950), American-born Canadian author
- Cynthia Adams Hoover (born 1934), American curator specializing in musical instruments
- Cynthia Hopkins, American performance artist, composer, and musician
- Cynthia Horner, American writer, magazine editor, and entertainment industry entrepreneur
- Cynthia Hotton (born 1969), Argentine politician
- Cynthia Ann Howell, real name of Jesse Jane (1980–2024), American pornographic film actress
- Cynthia Eppes Hudson (born 1959), American lawyer
- Cynthia Huffman, American mathematician, mathematics educator, and professor
- Cynthia Hughes (?–1989), Grenadian journalist
- Cynthia Ann Humes, American professor of religious studies
- Cynthia Huntington, American poet, memoirist, and professor of English and creative writing
- Cynthia Graham Hurd (1960–2015), African-American librarian, community leader, and victim of the Charleston church shooting
- Cynthia Illingworth (1920–1999), English consultant paediatrician and medical author
- Cynthia Ona Innis (born 1969), American painter and visual artist
- Cynthia Irwin-Williams (1936–1990), American archaeologist
- Cynthia James (born 1948), Trinidadian Canadian writer and literary theorist
- Cynthia Jameson, American emeritus professor of chemistry
- Cynthia Jarrett (1937–1985), British Jamaican woman whose death contributed to the Broadwater Farm riot
- Cynthia Jebb, Lady Gladwyn (1898–1990), English political hostess and diarist
- Cynthia Jele, South African novelist
- Cynthia Jenkins (1924–2001), American librarian, community activist, and politician
- Cynthia Jenks, American physical chemist
- Cynthia Jerotich Limo (born 1989), Kenyan long-distance runner
- Cynthia Johnson (businesswoman), American entrepreneur, marketing professional, search engine optimization specialist, social media influencer, author, and keynote speaker
- Cynthia Johnson (born 1956), American singer-songwriter and television personality
- Cynthia A. Johnson (born 1958), American politician
- Cynthia Johnston Turner, Canadian-American conductor and clinician
- Cynthia Johnston (born 1968), Canadian basketball player
- Cynthia E. Jones, American criminal defense attorney and professor of law
- Cynthia Jones, American scientist and professor
- Cynthia Kadohata (born 1956), Japanese American children's writer
- Cynthia Kauffman (born 1948), American pair skater
- Cynthia Kenny (1929–2021), English painter
- Cynthia Kenyon, American molecular biologist and biogerontologist
- Cynthia Keppel, American nuclear physicist
- Cynthia Kereluk (born 1960), Canadian fitness model and beauty pageant titleholder
- Cynthia Khan (born 1968), Taiwanese actress, dancer, and martial artist
- Cynthia Kierscht, American diplomat
- Cynthia Tse Kimberlin, American ethnomusicologist
- Cynthia D. Kinser (born 1951), American lawyer and former Supreme Court justice
- Cynthia Kirchner, American actress and fashion model
- Cynthia Kisser, American executive director of the now-defunct organization Cult Awareness Network
- Cynthia Klitbo (born 1967), Mexican telenovela-, theater-, and cinema actress
- Cynthia Knott (born 1952), American painter
- Cynthia Koh (born 1974), Singaporean actress
- Cynthia Konlan (born 2002), Ghanaian professional footballer
- Cynthia Krupat, American graphic designer
- Cynthia Kuhn (born 1965), American writer and editor of mystery fiction, and professor of English
- Cynthia Lahti (born 1963), American contemporary artist
- Cynthia Lai (1954–2022), Canadian politician
- Cynthia Laird, American news editor of Bay Area Reporter
- Cynthia Lamontagne (born 1966), American retired actress
- Cynthia Lamptey (born 1959), Ghanaian lawyer and public servant
- Cynthia Lander (born 1982), Venezuelan actress, TV host, and beauty pageant titleholder
- Cynthia Ann Stephanie Lauper, birth name of Cyndi Lauper (born 1953), American singer, songwriter, and actress
- Cynthia Lawson, Guatemalan-born digital artist, educator, technologist, and associate professor
- Cynthia Layne (1963–2015), American jazz- and neo soul singer
- Cynthia Leduc (born 1997), French sprinter
- Cynthia Lee, several people
- Cynthia Lemieux-Guillemette (born 1990), Canadian artistic gymnast
- Cynthia Lenige (1755–1780), Frisian poet
- Cynthia Lennon (1939–2015), English first wife of musician John Lennon
- Cynthia Leonard (1828–1908), American suffragist, aid worker, and writer
- Cynthia Levin, American stage director and theatre producer
- Cynthia Liandja (born 1995), Congolese handball player
- Cynthia Ligeard (born 1962), New Caledonian politician
- Cynthia Lindquist, American academic administrator
- Cynthia Lockhart (born 1952), American textile artist
- Cynthia Loewen (born 1993), Canadian blogger, model, and beauty pageant titleholder
- Cynthia Longfield (1896–1991), Anglo-Irish entomologist and explorer
- Cynthia López Castro (born 1987), Mexican politician
- Cynthia Lord, American author of children's literature
- Cynthia Loving, real name of Lil' Mo (born 1978), American R&B singer
- Cynthia Lowen, American producer, poet, and writer
- Cynthia Loyst (born 1978), Canadian talk show host and media personality
- Cynthia Lui (born 1977), Australian former politician
- Cynthia Lummis (born 1954), American attorney and politician
- Cynthia Luster, alternate name of Yukari Oshima (born 1963), Japanese actress and martial artist
- Cynthia Lynch (born 1971), American professional wrestler
- Cynthia Lynn (1937–2014), American actress
- Cynthia MacAdams (born 1939), American actress and photographer
- Cynthia Macdonald (philosopher) (born 1951), British philosopher, academic, and professor
- Cynthia Macdonald (1928–2015), American poet, educator, and psychoanalyst
- Cynthia MacGregor (1964–1996), American professional tennis player
- Cynthia MacLeod, Canadian fiddler
- Cynthia Maddox (born 1940), American model
- Cynthia L. Mahoney (1951–2006), American Episcopalian nun and chaplain
- Cynthia Mailman (born 1942), American painter and educator
- Cynthia Majeke, South African politician
- Cynthia Makris (born 1956), American soprano opera singer, and voice- and empowerment coach
- Cynthia Malkin, American wife of politician and attorney Richard Blumenthal
- Cinthya Marabá (born 1994), Brazilian politician
- Cynthia Martin (born 1961), American comic book artist
- Cynthia Martinez, American voice actress
- Cynthia A. Maryanoff (born 1949), American organic- and materials chemist
- Cynthia Mascitto (born 1992), Italian short track speed skater
- Cynthia Mathez (born 1985), Swiss para-badminton player
- Cynthia Maughan (1949–2019), American visual artist
- Cynthia Maung (born 1959), Karen medical doctor; founder of Mae Tao Clinic
- Cynthia May Alden (1862–1931), American journalist, author, and inventor
- Cynthia Mbamalu, Nigerian co-founder of non-profit organization YIAGA Africa
- Cynthia McClain-Hill (born 1957), American lawyer and policy strategist
- Cynthia McClintock, American university professor and author
- Cynthia McFadden (born 1956), American television journalist
- Cynthia Roberta McIntyre (born 1960), American theoretical physicist
- Cynthia McKinney (born 1955), American former politician
- Cynthia McLeod (born 1936), Surinamese novelist
- Cynthia McQuillin (1953–2006), American filk singer, writer, author, and artist
- Cynthia McWilliams, German-born American actress
- Cynthia Menard (born 2000), Canadian model and beauty pageant titleholder
- Cynthia Mendes (born 1980), American politician
- Cynthia Merhej (born 1989/1990), Lebanese-Palestinian fashion designer
- Cynthia Meyer (judge), American lawyer and former Supreme Court judge
- Cynthia Meyer (sport shooter) (born 1965), American-born Canadian trap shooter
- Cynthia Midgley (1925–2021), English past member of the Vivien Hind String Quartet
- Cynthia Miller-Idriss, American sociologist and professor
- Cynthia Catlin Miller (1791–1883), American abolitionist active in the Underground Railroad
- Cynthia H. Milligan, American lawyer and former dean
- Cynthia Woods Mitchell (?–2009), American wife of businessman, real estate developer, and philanthropist George P. Mitchell
- Cynthia A. Montgomery, American economist, academic, and professor
- Cynthia Charlotte Moon (1828–1895), American actress, journalist, and Confederate spy during the American Civil War
- Cynthia Moreno (born 1970), Mexican professional wrestler
- Cynthia Morgan (born 1991), Nigerian singer-songwriter
- Cynthia Taft Morris (1928–2013), American development economist
- Cynthia Mamle Morrison (born 1964), Ghanaian politician
- Cynthia Morrison, American escapologist and strongwoman
- Cynthia Mort (born 1956), American director, screenwriter, and producer
- Cynthia C. Morton (born 1955), American geneticist, professor, and director of cytogenetics
- Cynthia Moss (born 1940), American ethologist, conservationist, wildlife researcher, and writer
- Cynthia F. Moss, American neuroscientist and professor
- Cynthia Muge (born c. 1993), Kenyan politician
- Cynthia Mulligan (born 1973), Canadian television presenter
- Cynthia Mulrow (born 1953), American physician and scholar
- Cynthia Munwangari (born 1990), Burundian fashion designer, fashionista, and businesswoman
- Cynthia Murphy, Russian agent in the United States
- Cynthia Muvirimi (born 1983), Zimbabwean model and beauty pageant titleholder
- Cynthia Myers (1950–2011), American film actress and Playboy model
- Cynthia Nabozny, real name of Cyn (born 1993), American singer and songwriter
- Cynthia Nance, American dean and professor of law
- Cynthia Nations, American politician
- Cynthia Nava (born 1952), American former politician
- Cynthia Neale-Ishoy (born 1952), Canadian equestrian
- Cynthia Neeley, American politician
- Cynthia Neville, Canadian historian, medievalist, and professor of history
- Cynthia Ní Mhurchú (born 1966), Irish politician, barrister, and former radio host
- Cynthia Niako (born 1983), Côte d'Ivoire sprinter
- Cynthia Nicoletti, American legal historian and associate professor of law
- Cynthia Nielsen (born 1970), American philosopher and professor of philosophy
- Cynthia Nilson (born 1970), Argentine pop singer and songwriter
- Cynthia Nixon (born 1966), American actress, activist, and theater director
- Cynthia Nwadiora (born 1992), Nigerian lawyer, actress, model, and reality television personality
- Cynthia Ogunsemilore (born 2002), Nigerian boxer
- Cynthia Okereke (1960–2023), Nigerian actress and film producer
- Cynthia Olavarría (born 1982), Puerto Rican actress, fashion model, TV host, and beauty pageant titleholder
- Cynthia Olson Reichhardt, American condensed matter physicist
- Cynthia Ore (born 1970s), American woman notorious for her affair with politician Don Sherwood
- Cynthia Orozco, American professor of history and humanities
- Cynthia Ortega (born 1956), Dutch former politician
- Cynthia Osborne, American family researcher and associate dean
- Cynthia Oti, American investment broker and financial talk show host who died in the Alaska Airlines Flight 261 crash
- Cynthia Ozick (born 1928), American short story writer, novelist, and essayist
- Cynthia Paige Simon (born 1970), American visually impaired retired Paralympic judoka
- Cynthia Palmer, American founder of the Fitz Hugh Ludlow Memorial Library
- Cynthia Ann Parker (1827–1871), American woman whom Comanche Indians kidnapped
- Cynthia Payne (1932–2015), English madam, brothel keeper, party hostess, and media personality
- Cynthia Pelayo, Puerto Rican-born American author, poet, and journalist
- Cynthia Pepper (born 1940), American retired actress
- Cynthia Peretti (1948–2009), American professional wrestler and trainer
- Cynthia Shepard Perry (1928–2024), American educator and diplomat
- Cynthia Petersen, Canadian lawyer and judge
- Cynthia Phaneuf (born 1988), Canadian former competitive figure skater
- Cynthia Phelps (born 1961), American violist
- Cynthia Phillips, several people
- Cynthia Phua (born 1958), Singaporean business executive and former politician
- Cynthia Pine (born 1953), British dentistry educator
- Cynthia Plaster Caster (1947–2022), American visual artist
- Cynthia J. Popp (born 1962), American television director and producer
- Lady Cynthia Postan (1918–2017), English debutante, secretary, translator, editor, horticulturalist, and porcelain collector
- Cynthia Potter (born 1950), American former Olympic diver and diving color commentator
- Cynthia A. Pratt (born 1945), Bahamian politician
- Cynthia Preston (born 1968), Canadian actress
- Cynthia Prieto Conti, Paraguayan academic, professor, and politician
- Cynthia Pusheck (born 1964), American film- and television cinematographer
- Cynthia L. Quarterman, American lawyer and engineer
- Cynthia Quartey (born 1965), Ghanaian former sprinter
- Cynthia Radding, American historian, professor, and specialist in Latin American studies
- Cynthia Reed Nolan (1908–1976), Australian writer and gallerist
- Cynthia Reinhart-King, American biomedical engineer
- Cynthia Reyes, Jamaican-born Canadian author, and former journalist and executive producer
- Cynthia Rhodes (born 1956), American retired actress, singer, and dancer
- Cynthia Richards (born 1944), Jamaican singer
- Cynthia Rimsky (born 1962), Chilean writer and academic
- Cynthia D. Ritchie, American filmmaker, analyst, and social media campaigner involved in Pakistani affairs
- Cynthia Roberts, American waitress; cast member on The Real World: Miami
- Cynthia Robinson (disambiguation), several people
- Cynthia Rodríguez (born 1984), Mexican singer and reality TV personality
- Cynthia Roe (born 1959), American politician
- Cynthia Rogerson (born 1953), American-born Scottish writer
- Cynthia Rosenzweig (born 1958), American agronomist and climatologist at NASA
- Cynthia Roth (1957–1991), American second wife of convicted murderer and thief Randy Roth
- Cynthia Rothrock (born 1957), American martial artist and actress
- Cynthia Rowley (born 1968), American fashion designer
- Cynthia Rudin (born 1976), American computer scientist and statistician
- Cynthia M. Rufe (born 1948), American senior district judge
- Cynthia Cary Van Pelt Russell (1924–2019), American socialite
- Cynthia Eagle Russett (1937–2013), American historian
- Cynthia Ryder (born 1966), American Olympic rower
- Cynthia Rylant (born 1954), American author and librarian
- Cynthia Sakai (born 1982), Japanese-American entrepreneur and designer
- Cynthia Santana, American former television news reporter and anchor
- Cynthia Sayer (born 1962), American jazz banjoist and singer
- Cynthia Scheider, American film editor
- Cynthia Schira (born 1934), American textile artist and former university professor
- Cynthia Schloss (1948–1999), Jamaican singer
- Cynthia P. Schneider, American diplomat, educator, and professor
- Cynthia Scott (born 1939), Canadian screenwriter, and film director-, editor-, and producer
- Cynthia Scurtis, American psychologist, and former wife of former MLB player Alex Rodriguez
- Cynthia Sears, American infectious disease physician-scientist and professor
- Cynthia Selassie, American bio-organic- and medicinal chemist and professor
- Cynthia Selfe, American author, editor, scholar, teacher, and professor emerita of English
- Cynthia Senek (born 1993), Brazilian actress
- Cynthia Sestito, American contestant on Top Chef: San Francisco
- Cynthia Propper Seton (1926–1982), American writer and feminist
- Cynthia Shaddick (born 1944), Welsh former swimmer
- Cynthia Jeanne Shaheen (born 1947), American politician and former educator
- Cynthia Shalom (born 1988), Nigerian actress, producer, blogger, and businesswoman
- Cynthia Shange (1949–2026), South African model and actress
- Cynthia Sharma (born 1979), German biologist
- Cynthia Shearer (born 1955), American novelist
- Cynthia W. Shelmerdine, American classicist and archaeologist
- Cynthia Shilwatso (born 1999), Kenyan professional footballer
- Cynthia Shonga (born 2000), Zimbabwean footballer
- Cynthia Sikes Yorkin, American actress
- Cynthia Slater (1945–1989), American sex educator, HIV/AIDS activist, and dominatrix
- Cynthia Sleiter, Italian set decorator
- Cynthia Ann Smith, birth name of Frances McDormand (born 1957), American actress and film producer
- Cynthia Leitich Smith (born 1967), American author of fiction
- Cynthia Smock (born 1959), more commonly known as Sister Cindy, American campus preacher
- Cynthia Solomon (born 1938), American computer scientist
- Cynthia Soto (1962–2025), American politician
- Cynthia Spencer, Countess Spencer (1897–1972), British peeress
- Cynthia St-Georges (born 2001), Canadian curler
- Cynthia Morgan St. John (1852–1919), American Wordsworthian, book collector, and author
- Cynthia Stafford (born 1967), American politician
- Cynthia Starke-Jones, American politician
- Cynthia A. Stark, American professor of philosophy
- Cynthia Monica Starkie (?–1986), Scottish wife of businessman Henry Dewar, 3rd Baron Forteviot
- Cynthia Dianne Steel, American retired family judge
- Cynthia Stephens (born 1951), American attorney, jurist, and judge
- Cynthia Stevenson (born 1962), American actress
- Cynthia Stinger (born 1958), American former handball player
- Cynthia Stockley (1873–1936), South African-Rhodesian novelist
- Cynthia Stoltzmann, American mother of convicted murderer Sammantha Allen
- Cynthia Stone (1926–1988), American actress
- Cynthia Strother (1935–2024), American singer; past member of singing duo The Bell Sisters
- Cynthia Stroum (born 1950), American diplomat and political donor
- Cynthia Sullivan (born 1949), American former politician
- Cynthia Sung, American roboticist
- Cynthia Delaney Suwito (born 1993), Indonesian artist
- Cynthia Szigeti (1949–2016), American comic actress and acting teacher
- Cynthia Ta'ala (born 1974), New Zealand former rugby league player and current assistant coach
- Cynthia Taggart (1801/1804–1849), American poet
- Cynthia Tait (1894–1962), South African botanist
- Cynthia Teague (1907–2007), Australian architect and public servant
- Cynthia A. Telles, American academic, diplomat, psychologist, and clinical professor
- Cynthia Teniente-Matson (born 1965), American university president
- Cynthia Thielen (born 1933), American politician
- Cynthia Thomalla, birth name of Thia Thomalla (born 1995), German-Filipino actress, model, and pageant titleholder
- Cynthia-Ann Thomas (born 1950s), American former professional tennis player
- Cynthia Thompson (1923–2019), Jamaican sprinter
- Cynthia K. Thompson, American neurolinguist and cognitive neuroscientist
- Cynthia Tingey (1931–2005), English costume designer for theatre and film
- Cynthia Tocci, American young adult fantasy author, screenwriter, film- and theatrical producer, actress, and accountant
- Cynthia Tomescu (born 1991), Romanian handballer
- Cynthia Toohey (1934–2021), American nurse, businesswoman, and politician
- Cynthia Torres (1911–2001), Guamanian businesswoman, politician, and educator
- Cynthia Ann Toth, American ophthalmologist and professor
- Cynthia True, American creator of comedy animated TV series The Mighty B!
- Cynthia Gabisile Tshabalala (born 1979), South African politician
- Cynthia Tucker, several people
- Cynthia Turner (1932–2021), Maltese pianist
- Cynthia Tuwankotta (born 1977), Indonesian former badminton player
- Cynthia Umezulike, British Nigerian human rights lawyer, legal scholar, author, professor, and climate sustainability activist
- Cynthia Uwak (born 1986), Nigerian footballer
- Cynthia Valdez (born 1987), Mexican rhythmic gymnast
- Cynthia Valenzuela Dixon (born 1969), American lawyer and former district judge
- Cynthia Valstein-Montnor (born c. 1955), Surinamese judge
- Cynthia Vescan (born 1992), French freestyle wrestler
- Cynthia Villar (born 1950), Filipina politician and businesswoman
- Cynthia Vinzant, American mathematician
- Cynthia Viteri (born 1965), Ecuadorian lawyer, journalist, and politician
- Cynthia Voigt (born 1942), American writer of young adult books
- Cynthia Volkert (born 1960), American-German nanoscientist
- Cynthia von Buhler (born 1964), American artist, author, playwright, performer, and producer
- Cynthia Wade, American television-, commercial-, and film director, producer, and cinematographer
- Cynthia Wandia (born 1986), Kenyan electrical engineer, polyglot, entrepreneur, businesswoman, and corporate executive
- Cynthia Warrick, American college president
- Cynthia Watros (born 1968), American actress
- Cynthia Weber, American-born British professor of international relations
- Cynthia Webster, American cinematographer
- Cynthia Clark Wedel (1908–1986), American Episcopal leader and educator
- Cynthia Weil (1940–2023), American lyricist
- Cynthia Wells (born 1956/1957), American animated film maker, artist, and triathlete
- Cynthia Wesley (1949–1963), American victim of the 1963 16th Street Baptist Church bombing
- Cynthia Wesson (1886–1981), American athlete and physical educator
- Cynthia Westcott (1898–1983), American plant pathologist, author, and expert on roses
- Cynthia Whitchurch, Australian microbiologist and professor
- Cynthia Whitcomb, American television screenwriter and teacher
- Cynthia White (born 1956), New Zealand applied linguistics academic
- Cynthia Whittaker (1941–2023), American academic and author
- Cynthia Willard-Lewis (born 1952), American politician
- Cynthia Willett, American philosopher and professor
- Cynthia Wilson (born 1934), Barbadian educator, performer, and writer
- Cynthia Wolberger, American structural biologist
- Cynthia Griffin Wolff (1936–2024), American literary historian and editor
- Cynthia Wolken, American politician
- Cynthia Wong, Hong Kong spouse of businessman Victor Li Tzar-kuoi
- Cynthia Wood (born 1950), American model and actress
- Cynthia Woodhead (born 1964), American former competition swimmer, world champion, Olympic medalist, and former world record-holder
- Cynthia Wu-Maheux, Canadian actress
- Cynthia Wu (born 1978), Taiwanese business executive and politician
- Cynthia Wyels, American mathematician
- Cynthia Yao (born 1940), Jamaican-born American museum founder and former executive director
- Cynthia Young, several people
- Cynthia Zamora (1938–2019), Filipino actress
- Cynthia Zarin (born 1959), American poet and journalist
- Cynthia Zukas (1931–2024), South African-born Zambian painter

== Fictional characters ==
=== Cartoons, comics, manga ===
- Cynthia Reynolds, in the US comic books published by DC Comics
- Cynthia Von Doom, in the US comic books published by Marvel Comics
- Cynthia Vortex, in the US animated science fiction and adventure TV series The Adventures of Jimmy Neutron, Boy Genius, voiced by Carolyn Lawrence

=== Movies ===
- Cynthia Brisby, in the 1982 US animated fantasy adventure film The Secret of NIMH, voiced by Jodi Hicks
- Cynthia Strode, in the US slasher media franchise Halloween, played by Dee Wallace

=== Other uses ===
- Cynthia (Gaba girl), a plaster mannequin of the 1930s created by Lester Gaba
- Cynthia (Pokémon), the champion of the Sinnoh region in the Pokémon video games
- Cynthia Brady, in the US sitcom The Brady Bunch, played by Susan Olsen
- Cynthia Daggert, in the UK TV soap opera Emmerdale, played by Kay Purcell
- Cynthia Marshall, in the UK TV soap opera EastEnders, played by Alexandra Bastedo
- Cynthia McEachin, in the US science fiction action drama TV series Dark Angel, played by Valarie Rae Miller
- Lady Cynthia Muldoon, a main character in the absurdist Tom Stoppard play The Real Inspector Hound
- Cynthia Phillips, in the US drama TV series Being Mary Jane, played by Kelly Rutherford
- Cynthia Ross, in the Australian TV soap opera Home and Away, played by Belinda Giblin
- Cynthia Sanders, in the US TV sitcom Malcolm in the Middle, played by Tania Raymonde
- Cynthia Velasquez, in the Japanese horror media franchise Silent Hill, voiced by Lisa Ortiz
- Cynthia "Cindy" Vortex, a character from The Adventures of Jimmy Neutron, Boy Genius

== See also ==
- Cindy (given name)
