= Hiner =

Hiner may refer to:

== People ==
- Cynthia Hiner, an American politician
- William Hiner, an American politician

== Places ==
- Hiner, Kentucky, a community in Perry County
