= Bendlin =

Bendlin is a surname. Notable people with the surname include:

- Andreas Bendlin (born 1966), German historian and scholar
- Cynthia Bendlin (fl. early 21st century), Paraguayan activist
- Kurt Bendlin (born 1943), German athlete
