= Cynthia Lee =

Cynthia Lee may refer to:

- Cynthia Bailey Lee, American computer scientist
- Cynthia Cozette Lee (born 1953), African-American classical music composer and librettist
- Cynthia Lee Fontaine, stage name of Carlos Díaz Hernández (born 1981), Puerto Rican-born American drag performer and reality television personality
- Cynthia Ling Lee, American dancer, choreographer, and scholar
