= Cynthia Eppes Hudson =

American lawyer (born 1959)

Chief Deputy Attorney General of Virginia
- Incumbent
- Assumed office January 2014
- Preceded by: Patricia L. West

Personal details
- Born: 1959 (age 66–67) Crewe, Virginia, U.S.
- Education: Virginia Commonwealth University (BS); The College of William and Mary (JD)

Cynthia Eppes Hudson (born 1959) is an American lawyer who serves as Chief Deputy Attorney General for the Commonwealth of Virginia.

A native of Crewe, Virginia, Hudson graduated from Virginia Commonwealth University in 1981; she completed her J.D. degree at the Marshall-Wythe School of Law of the College of William and Mary in 1987. Initially upon graduation she joined the Richmond law firm McGuire, Woods, Battle & Boothe; choosing a path of civic service instead she became deputy city attorney for Hampton, Virginia in 1996, and was appointed city attorney in 2006. She was named deputy attorney general by Mark R. Herring in December 2013, becoming the first African-American woman to hold the post. Hudson serves as an adjunct faculty member at the College of William and Mary and the University of Richmond. In 2013 she was elected president of the Local Government Attorneys of Virginia. In 2012 Virginia Lawyers Weekly named her one of its Influential Women in Virginia; in 2015 the Virginia Law Foundation named her a Fellow in recognition of her excellence in the law and public service. She was named one of the Library of Virginia's Virginia Women in History in 2017.
