= Cynthia Hogue =

American poet

Cynthia Hogue (August 26, 1951) is an American poet, translator, critic and professor. She specializes in the study of feminist poetics, and has written in the areas of ecopoetics and the poetics of witness. In 2014 she held the Maxine and Jonathan Marshall Chair in Modern and Contemporary Poetry in the Department of English at Arizona State University.

== Early life and education ==
Hogue was born in the Midwestern United States and raised in the Adirondack Mountains of upstate New York. As an undergraduate, she studied the art of literary translation, taking classes at Oberlin College in which she worked from trots (translating classical Japanese poetry in combination with the study of Ezra Pound's translation work), as well as taking courses in German and French literature.

== Academic career ==
Hogue has lived and taught in Iceland, Denmark, at the University of New Orleans, in New York, and Pennsylvania, where she directed the Stadler Center for Poetry at Bucknell University for eight years. She has received a Fulbright Fellowship, a National Endowment for the Arts Fellowship in poetry, the H.D. Fellowship at the Beinecke Library at Yale University, an Arizona Commission on the Arts Project Grant, MacDowell and Wurlitzer residencies, and the Witter Bynner Translation Residency Fellowship at the Santa Fe Art Institute. In 2003, she became the Maxine and Jonathan Marshall Chair in Modern and Contemporary Poetry in the Department of English at Arizona State University. She taught English and creative writing at ASU until she retired. She is now an ASU Emerita Professor of English. She lives in Tucson, Arizona and teaches workshops at the University of Arizona Poetry Center.

== Writing career ==
=== Poetry ===
Hogue is known for her collection of poetry about Hurricane Katrina, When the Water Came: Evacuees of Hurricane Katrina, which features interview-poems by Hogue and photographs by Rebecca Ross. Cynthia Hogue has published nine collections of poetry as of 2017, most recently, In June the Labyrinth. Hogue also published The Incognito Body which focuses on her disability, rheumatoid arthritis.

=== Literary criticism ===
Hogue has published essays on poetry, ranging from that of Emily Dickinson to Kathleen Fraser and Harryette Mullen. Her critical work includes the co-edited editions We Who Love To Be Astonished: Experimental Feminist Poetics and Performance Art; Innovative Women Poets: An Anthology of Contemporary Poetry and Interviews; and the first edition of H.D.’s The Sword Went Out to Sea (Synthesis of a Dream), by Delia Alton.

== Awards ==
Hogue was presented with the 2013 Harold Morton Landon Translation Award from the Academy of American Poets for her co-translation with Sylvain Gallais of Virginie Lalucq and Jean-Luc Nancy's Fortino Sámano: (The Overflowing of the Poem).

== Published work ==
- instead, it is dark, Red Hen Press, 2023
- Lointaines by Nicole Brossard, co-translated with Sylvain Gallais, Omnidawn, 2022
- Contain, Tram Editions, 2022
- In June the Labyrinth, Red Hen Press, 2017
- Revenance, Red Hen Press, 2014
- Or Consequence, Red Hen Press, 2010
- When the Water Came: Evacuees of Hurricane Katrina with photographer Rebecca Ross, University of New Orleans Press, 2010
- Under Erasure as in: Sign (Silence) e-chapbook, published in The Drunken Boat 7:3-4 (Fall/Winter 2007)
- The Incognito Body, Red Hen Press, 2006
- Flux, New Issues Press 2002
- The Never Wife, Mammoth Press, 1999
- The Woman in Red, Ahsahta Press, 1990
- Where the Parallels Cross, Whiteknights Press, 1984
- Touchwood, Porchwood Press, 1979
- Fortino Sámano (The Overflowing of the Poem) by Virginie Lalucq and Jean-Luc Nancy, co-translated with Sylvain Gallais, Omnidawn, 2012
- The Sword Went Out to Sea (Synthesis of a Dream) by Delia Alton, co-edited with Julie Vandivere, University Press of Florida, 2007
- Innovative Women Poets: An Anthology of Contemporary Poetry and Interviews, co-edited with Elisabeth Frost, University of Iowa Press, 2007
- We Who Love To Be Astonished: Experimental Feminist Poetics and Performance Art, co-edited with Laura Hinton, University of Alabama Press, 2001
- Scheming Women: Poetry, Privilege, and the Politics of Subjectivity State, University of New York Press, 1995
