= Cynthia Sakai =

Cynthia K. Sakai
- Cynthia K. Sakai
- Born: March 13, 1982 (age 44)
- Occupation: Entrepreneur
- Label: evolvetogether
- Awards: Member of the Council of Fashion Designers of America

Cynthia K. Sakai (born March 13, 1982) is a Japanese-American entrepreneur and designer best known as the founder of evolvetogether, a personal care brand.

== Early life ==
Sakai was born and raised in Southern California. Her mother worked in the luxury fashion industry, and her father was an architect.

== Career ==
Sakai launched her first accessories line, Girlboy by Koco, at the age of 18.

At the age of 21, she started a multiline showroom in Los Angeles and worked as an actress.

=== Vita Fede ===
After she received a handcrafted bracelet from Florence, she traveled to Italy to find and meet the local artisan. She was inspired and founded Vita Fede in 2009. The brand's products were made in Italy and distributed throughout Europe, Asia, South America, Canada and the Middle East. The jewelry line was presented in major retailers including Bergdorf Goodman and Neiman Marcus. In 2014, Sakai became a member of the Council of Fashion Designers of America.

=== evolvetogether ===
In 2020, Sakai founded evolvetogether in response to the COVID‑19 pandemic, initially producing medical‑grade face masks stamped with global coordinates. The brand launched with medical-grade face masks, a daily essential most needed at the time, and each mask was stamped with global coordinates as a reminder that we're all connected, no matter our gender, race, or where we live. The evolvetogether masks were worn by frontline workers, from healthcare workers to delivery personnel, and public figures such as Rihanna, the sisters Hadid, the Biebers, Sarah Jessica Parker, and more. By 2025, evolvetogether had sold over $50 million in masks.

The brand later expanded into personal care, offering aluminum‑free deodorant, hydrating hand cream, lip balm, and a cream‑to‑oil body wash. All products adhere to Credo‑clean formulations, feature custom‑crafted fragrances, and use reusable or biodegradable packaging materials such as aluminum, glass, and sugarcane waste. Each item is also stamped with global coordinates.

In 2025, Cynthia Sakai was honored as a Visionary Award recipient by CEW for her contributions to innovation in beauty and personal care.

As of 2025, the brand has received two Allure “Best of Beauty” awards, and its products are available at retailers such as Bluemercury, Nordstrom, Credo, and Erewhon.
