= Cynthia Maddox =

American model (born 1940)

Cynthia Maddox (born November 30, 1940) is an American model who is best known for appearing on the cover of Playboy magazine five times in the early to mid-1960s, though she was never a playmate.

Initially a receptionist and secretary at Playboy's headquarters in Chicago, Illinois, Maddox rose to the position of assistant cartoon editor at the magazine. She dated Hugh Hefner in the early 1960s but left him when he wouldn't marry her.

Maddox attended Wright Junior College for at least one semester. She went on to attend the University of Chicago.
