= Cynthia Jones =

American scientist and professor

- Education: Boston University (B.A.); University of Rhode Island (M.S., Ph.D.)
- Scientific career
- Workplaces: National Marine Fisheries Service; Virginia Institute of Marine Science; Old Dominion University
- Thesis: The Otolith Ageing Technique in Larval Fish (1984)
- Doctoral advisor: Saul Saila

Cynthia M. Jones is an American fisheries biologist who is a professor at Old Dominion University, where she served as the A.D. and Annye L. Morgan Endowed Chair of Science from 2009 to 2014.

== Education ==
Jones completed a B.A. in zoology with summa cum laude and Phi Beta Kappa honors from Boston University in 1968. Her honors thesis was the role of pectinic acids in foliar abscission. She earned an M.S. (1973) and Ph.D. (1984) in oceanography from University of Rhode Island. Her master's thesis was titled Ecology and Physiology of Cancer spp. while her dissertation was titled The Otolith Ageing Technique in Larval Fish. Her doctoral advisor was Saul Saila. While completing her Ph.D., Jones earned a minor in statistics and computer science. She was a postdoctoral associate in the department of natural resources at Cornell University from 1984 to 1985.

== Career ==
Jones was a fisheries biologist from 1978 to 1980 at the National Marine Fisheries Service (NMFS) where analyzed the change in community structure of zooplankton and larval fish at Georges Bank. She also performed statistical analysis and programming of the MARMAP database at NMFS. From 1982 to 1983, Jones was a statistical programmer at the Pawtucket Heart Health Program. At Pawtucket, she worked in statistical application programming and database management for community intervention medical assessment to prevent cardiac disease. From 1986 to 1988, Jones was an adjunct assistant professor at the Virginia Institute of Marine Science and an assistant professor in the department of oceanography at Old Dominion University (ODU). Jones was on the faculty in the ODU department of biological sciences from 1988 to 2003. In 2003, Jones became an eminent scholar and professor in the department of ocean, earth, and atmospheric sciences at ODU. From 2009 to 2014, Jones was the A.D. and Annye L. Morgan Endowed Chair of Science at ODU. She is the director of the Center for Quantitative Fisheries Ecology at ODU.

=== Select publications ===
- Thorrold, S.R.; Latkoczy, C.; Swart, P.K.; Jones, C.M. (12 January 2001). "Natal Homing in a Marine Fish Metapopulation". Science. 291 (5502): 297–299. Bibcode:2001Sci...291..297T. doi:10.1126/science.291.5502.297. PMID 11209078.
- Wells, Brian K.; Rieman, Bruce E.; Clayton, James L.; Horan, Dona L.; Jones, Cynthia M. (2003). "Relationships between Water, Otolith, and Scale Chemistries of Westslope Cutthroat Trout from the Coeur d'Alene River, Idaho: The Potential Application of Hard-Part Chemistry to Describe Movements in Freshwater". Transactions of the American Fisheries Society. 132 (3): 409–424. doi:10.1577/1548-8659(2003)132<0409:RBWOAS>2.0.CO;2. S2CID 16341009.
- Bath, Gretchen E; Thorrold, Simon R; Jones, Cynthia M; Campana, Steven E; McLaren, James W; Lam, Joseph W.H (May 2000). "Strontium and barium uptake in aragonitic otoliths of marine fish". Geochimica et Cosmochimica Acta. 64 (10): 1705–1714. Bibcode:2000GeCoA..64.1705B. doi:10.1016/S0016-7037(99)00419-6.
- Jones, C. M.; Palmer, M.; Schaffler, J. J. (February 2017). "Beyond Zar: the use and abuse of classification statistics for otolith chemistry: otolith chemistry classification statistics". Journal of Fish Biology. 90 (2): 492–504. doi:10.1111/jfb.13051. PMID 27325371.

== Awards and honors ==
In 2009, she was elected Fellow of the American Association for the Advancement of Science.
