= Cynthia Johnson (businesswoman) =

American entrepreneur and author

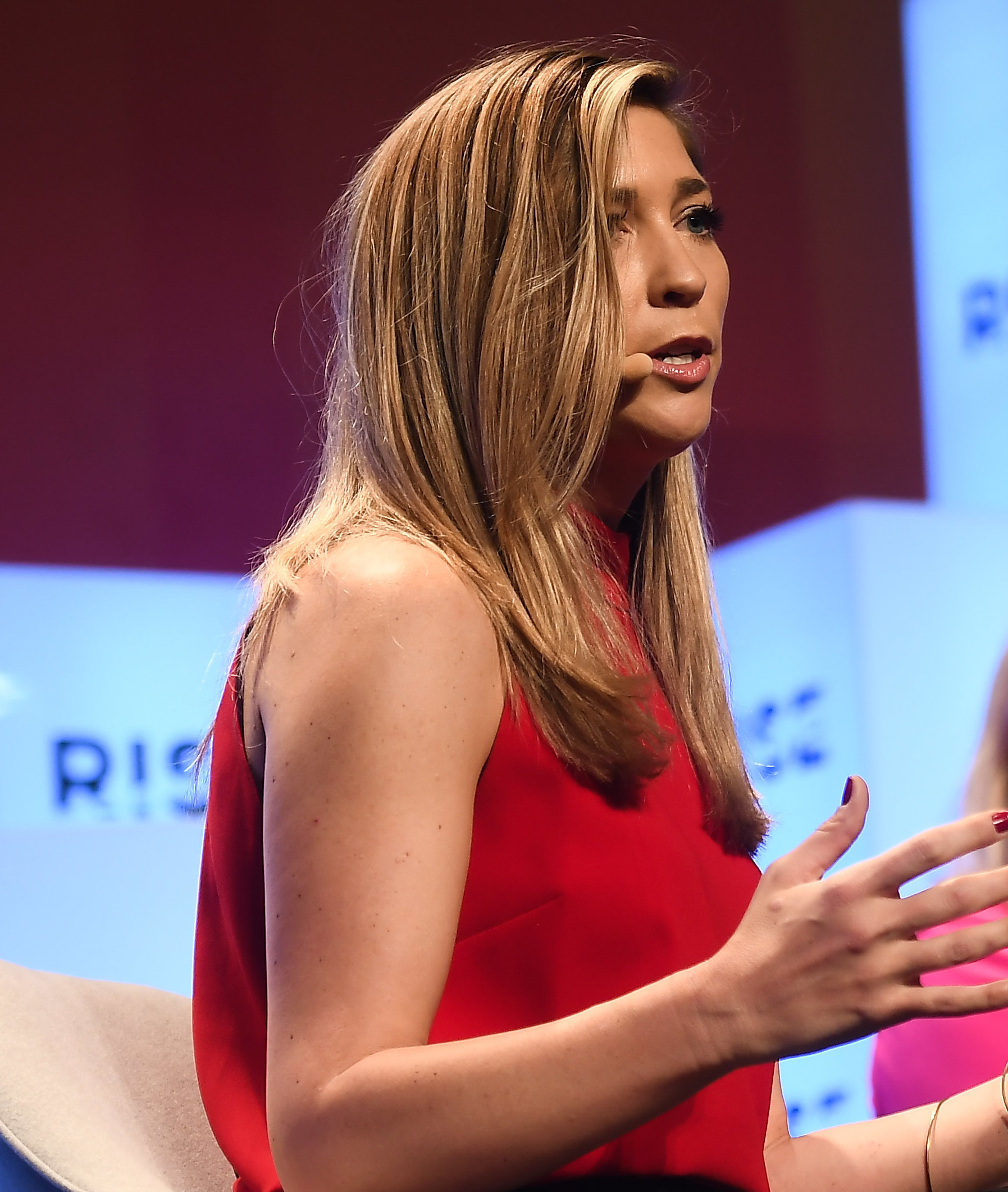
- Cynthia Johnson in 2019
- Occupation: Marketing professional
- Organization(s): American Addiction Centers, Ipseity Media
- Website: www.cynthialive.com

Cynthia Johnson is an American entrepreneur, marketing professional, search engine optimization specialist, social media influencer, author and keynote speaker. She is a co-founder of Ipseity Media and previously served as the director of brand development of American Addiction Centers (AAC). She is also a contributing columnist for Entrepreneur, Fox News, Chicago Tribune and several other industry publications. She is currently member of the Board of Directors for United Nations Women U.S. National Committee, L.A. and Forbes Agency Council. According to Entrepreneur Magazine, Cynthia was one of the 10 Personal Branding Experts to Follow, in 2017.

== Career ==
Johnson previously served as the educational director and global board member at Social Media Club. Presently, he is a member of the Young Entrepreneurs Council, an Advisory Board Member for nGage.Social, and a committee member for the Charlotte and Gwenyth Gray Foundation to Cure Batten Disease.

She was a partner of RankLab, which was acquired by American Addiction Centers in 2015. Starting in the same year, she assumed the role of Director of Brand Development at American Additionally, she co-founded Ipseity Media and serves as its CEO. Moreover, she is the co-founder and CEO of Bell + Ivy, a digital marketing and personal branding agency located in Santa Monica, CA. She also sits on the advisory board for the Millennium Alliance.

== Published works ==
- Johnson, Cynthia (2019). Platform: The Art and Science of Personal Branding. New York: Crown Publishers. ISBN 9780399581373.
