= Cynthia Gómez =

American psychologist

Cynthia A Gómez
- Born: September 9, 1958 (age 68)
- Education: B.A., Boston University Ed. M., Harvard University Ph.D., Boston University
- Scientific career
- Fields: Public Health
- Workplaces: San Francisco State University University of California, San Francisco

Cynthia Ann Gómez (born September 9, 1958) is an American psychologist who works in public health. She is known for her work in the field of HIV/AIDS prevention, health care access and health equity for minority individuals and committees. Likewise, one of her most major accomplishments was being the founding director of the Health Equity Institute at San Francisco State University. She has been a teacher and researcher, as well as a leader in both teaching and governmental positions.She has been honored as Professor Emeritus at San Francisco State University.

== Life and education ==
Cynthia Gómez is a third generation Mexican American. She was born in Long Beach, California, on September 9, 1958. Her parents, Lilly Gonzales and Augustine U. Gómez, are both of Mexican descent. She moved to a small village in Ecuador at the age of six because of her father's job at a tuna cannery, where she learned how to speak Spanish, and then later lived in Puerto Rico from 1968 to 1975. Afterwards, she moved to Boston, where she received her B.A. in psychology from Boston University in 1979. She then also received her Master of Education degree (Ed.M.) in Counseling and Consulting Psychology at Harvard University in 1982 and then her PhD in Clinical Psychology at Boston University in 1990. In 1991, she then moved to San Francisco to work as a researcher at the Center for AIDS Prevention Studies at the University of California at San Francisco, the city where she currently resides today. She is bilingual as she speaks both Spanish and English, and has a Puerto Rican accent which she says is a source of confusion for people. She has been known to utilize her Latina background to be a leader and role model for the students she teaches as well as her colleagues. Her leadership skills have been noted by National AIDS Fund president and CEO Kandy Ferree.

She started her career with the idea of becoming a child psychologist but later moved to public health, with a strong focus on equal opportunity and championing disadvantaged groups due to her Latina heritage. She has advocated for the improvement of health for these underserved groups, which include imprisoned women, gay men, lesbian women, and people of color, in ways such as contacting and advising groups that work to help them. One such group included a community health center in Boston that Gómez worked with during the beginning of the AIDS epidemic which provided care for these underserved groups.

== Work and service ==
Before starting her work in HIV, Gómez worked in community health settings for 12 years. This included being the director of the Children's Mental Health Services of the Southern Jamaica Plain Health Center in Boston. Other positions she held in community settings included her first professional job at the Upham's Corner Health center as a community outreach worker and mental health counselor, as well as being a psychology intern at the Cambridge Child Guidance Center, a psychotherapist and mobile crisis team therapist at the AtlantiCare Medical Center, and also a clinical psychology fellow at the Harvard Medical School Massachusetts Mental Health Center. These positions were all in Massachusetts, many of which were in the Boston area.

She has numerous awards from American Psychological Association (APA), notably the 2016 APA Presidential Citation, and Distinguished Contribution to Ethnic Minority Issues Award from APA Div. 44 (Society for the Psychology of Sexual Orientation and Gender Diversity). This award, given every year to psychologists for their extraordinary work, was given to Gómez for her work on HIV/AIDS prevention, as well as for advocating for underserved groups and communities when it comes to healthcare.

Gómez has served on the Presidential Advisory Council on HIV/AIDS under both the WJ Clinton and GW Bush administrations; the Center of Disease Control and Prevention's HIV and STD Advisory Council; the Substance Abuse and Mental Health Services Administration's Advisory Committee on Women's Services; and the Institute of Medicine's Committees on Prisoners and Research, and on Lesbian Health. Furthermore, she also was part of the first California Public Health Advisory Council and the first California Office of Health Equity Advisory Committee, in 2007 and 2013 respectively. She was appointed to the CA Public Health Advisory Council by Arnold Schwarzenegger, who was the state's governor at the time. Gómez served on the American Psychological Association Committee on Psychology and AIDS and on the Board of Professional Affairs.

In 1997, after her time working as a researcher at the University of California at San Francisco, she began working there as an assistant professor at the Center for AIDS Prevention Studies (CAPS), and in 2002 became the co-director of CAPS until she left in 2006 to create the Health Equity Institute at San Francisco State University. Over time, Gómez has also written and co-written numerous scholarly papers and has given many presentations all over the world regarding problems dealing with HIV and AIDS, women's health and health equity. Most recently her work has included serving on the U.S. Secretary of Health’s Advisory Committee, focusing on the National Health Promotion and Disease Prevention Objectives for 2030. Along with this, she is a part of the board of directors for ETR Associates as well as the chair of the board of trustees for the Northern California Planned Parenthood. In 2026, she has also became part of the board of directors for the Society of Family Planning, an organization focused in disseminating information regarding contraception and abortion.

== Health Equity Institute ==
Gómez founded the Health Equity Institute at San Francisco State University in 2006. Her work has focused on gender, culture and sexual health, the development of prevention interventions and the application of science to community practice. The organization's guiding principles are: equality and justice framework; multi-disciplinary approaches; community-scientist collaboration; and translational, implementation and effectiveness research.

The organization seeks to eliminate the preventable disparities in health, especially those caused by political carelessness and socioeconomic status. Likewise, Dr. Gómez and the rest of the organization utilize psychology, anthropology, biology, sociology, media, medicine, political policy, economics, and ethics in order to study the mechanisms that lead to inequalities and injustice in order to help people cope with those risks and lobby for political policies beneficial for social justice. By working with communities, health departments, institutions, and scientist the studies yield more complete answers to complicated issues. Lastly, Dr. Gómez focuses on closing the gap between just prevention techniques and effective, well established treatment practices.

Projects that the organization tackles include adding a community garden program to a local elementary school in a predominantly black neighborhood. This way the children can have fresh fruits and vegetables that they are lacking.

== Selected publications ==
The most cited publications by Gomez to date are:

- Gómez, C. A., & Marín, B. V. (1996). Gender, culture, and power: Barriers to HIV‐prevention strategies for women. The Journal of Sex Research, 33(4), 355–362
- Parsons, J. T., Schrimshaw, E. W., Wolitski, R. J., Halkitis, P. N., Purcell, D. W., Hoff, C. C., & Gómez, C. A. (2005). Sexual harm reduction practices of HIV-seropositive gay and bisexual men: serosorting, strategic positioning, and withdrawal before ejaculation. AIDS (London, England), 19 Suppl 1, S13–S2
- Courtenay-Quirk, C., Wolitski, R. J., Parsons, J. T., Gómez, C. A., & Seropositive Urban Men's Study Team (2006). Is HIV/AIDS stigma dividing the gay community? Perceptions of HIV-positive men who have sex with men. AIDS education and prevention : official publication of the International Society for AIDS Education, 18(1), 56–67
- Marín, B. V., Tschann, J. M., Gómez, C. A., & Kegeles, S. M. (1993). Acculturation and gender differences in sexual attitudes and behaviors:Hispanic vs non-Hispanic white unmarried adults. American journal of public health, 83(12), 1759–1761
- Vanoss Marín, B., Coyle, K. K., Gómez, C. A., Carvajal, S. C., & Kirby, D. B. (2000). Older boyfriends and girlfriends increase risk of sexual initiation in young adolescents. The Journal of adolescent health : official publication of the Society for Adolescent Medicine, 27(6), 409–418
- Gómez, C. A., Kleinman, D. V., Pronk, N., Wrenn Gordon, G. L., Ochiai, E., Blakey, C., Johnson, A., & Brewer, K. H. (2021). Addressing Health Equity and Social Determinants of Health Through Healthy People 2030. Journal of public health management and practice : JPHMP, 27(Suppl 6), S249–S257
