= Cynthia Herrup =

American historian

Cynthia Herrup is an American historian of early modern British law who holds the position of Professor of History and Law at the University of Southern California.

Herrup's writings center primarily on the social history of criminal law, but she also touches upon the historical impact of gender and sexuality. Her first book, The Common Peace: Participation and the Criminal Law in Seventeenth-Century England, examined how communities without lawyers made decisions about law enforcement—it postulated that people as well as lawyers were important in the history of law. Her second book, A House in Gross Disorder: Sex, Law, and the 2nd Earl of Castlehaven (1999), used a notorious trial to explore how law reflected tensions between genders and generations.

She has held many fellowships, including those from the Folger Shakespeare Library, the National Humanities Center, and the Huntington Library.

== Career ==
Cynthia Herrup edited the Journal of British Studies from 1991 to 1996. From 1995 to 1997, she served on the editorial board of the Journal of Modern History. Herrup was also president of the North American Conference on British Studies from 2003 to 2005.

Until 2005, she served as William Kenneth Boyd Professor of History and Law at Duke University.

== Awards ==
While teaching at Duke University in 1988, Cynthia Herrup was a recipient of a Guggenheim Fellowship.

== Bibliography ==
- The Common Peace: Participation and the Criminal Law in Seventeenth-Century England (1987)
- A House in Gross Disorder: Sex, Law, and the 2nd Earl of Castlehaven (1999)
