= Cynthia Valstein-Montnor =

Surinamese judge

- Born: c. 1955; Suriname
- Occupation(s): Lawyer, jurist
- Known for: December murders trial

Cynthia Valstein-Montnor (c. 1955) is a Surinamese judge. She was the acting president of the High Court of Justice of Suriname from 2011 until 2014. Alongside this role she was also the presiding judge officiating the Military Court, regarding the murder-trial of President Desi Bouterse and his role in the December murders.

== Biography ==
Valstein-Montnor was born in Suriname. In 1973, she started studying law at the University of Utrecht and Amsterdam. She wrote her thesis on the Trade Agreement of Lomé. She returned to Suriname in the 1980s and worked as a jurist at the Foreign Ministry.

In 1993 Valstein-Montnor started a RAIO-course (judge in training) together with four other candidates. She graduated as the sole candidate, and in 1997 was appointed as the first female judge in Suriname.

On 30 November 2007, the court-martial of the December murders commenced, and Valstein-Montnor was appointed presiding judge. The main suspect was former President Desi Bouterse. In 2019, Bouterse was convicted to 20 year imprisonment for murder.

On 1 January 2011 Valstein-Montnor was appointed acting president of the High Court of Justice of Suriname. In 2014, she resigned as president, but remained vice president of the court. In 2022 Valstein-Montnor was awarded the Pioneering Caribbean Women Jurist Award for her achievements in the field of justice.
