= Cynthia M. Grund =

American philosopher and educator (born 1956)

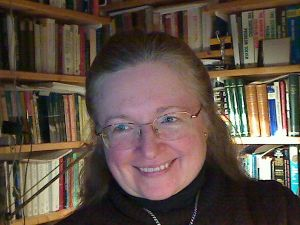
Cynthia M. Grund

Cynthia M. Grund (born 19 January 1956, New Haven, Connecticut) is an American philosopher and educator who, as of August 2016, is an Associate Professor of Philosophy at the University of Southern Denmark, where she is also Research Director for The Aesthetics of Music and Sound project.

== Biography ==
Grund received her B.A. at Bryn Mawr College in Pennsylvania before continuing her studies at Uppsala University, Sweden, and at the University of Tampere, Finland, where she earned a Ph.D. in 1997 with her thesis Constitutive Counterfactuality: The Logic of Interpretation in Metaphor and Music. She joined the teaching staff of the University of Southern Denmark in Odense in 1997, where she now holds the post of Associate Professor of Philosophy.

In 2008, she launched an educational web-based project on Second Life aimed at reconstructing the house and surroundings in Rhode Island where the American philosopher George Berkeley lived in the 1730s.

Grund, who has a background in music, is the founder and editor of the Journal of Music and Meaning. She has appeared in Denmark as a piano accompanist. Grund chairs Netværk for Tværvidenskabelige Studier af Musik og Betydning and has served as secretary of the Dansk Filosofisk Selsk ab where she is a member of the editorial board.

== Publications ==
- "Video Suite – in Three Movements: Jensenius-Westney-Grund on Motion-capture, Music and Meaning" Multimodal webpage presentation of original motion-capture video with accompanying audio as well as original documentary- and interview-video and audio of the motion-capture labwork, www.nnimipa.org/JWG.html, Nordic Network for the Integration of Music Informatics, Performance and Aesthetics, a network funded under The Nordic Council of Ministers' NordPlus Program, 2010.
- "Filosofiske og æstetiske overvejelser over digitalisering af musik og lyd." Multimedia presedtation and paper presented at the 2010 Annual Meeting of the Danish Musicological Society/Dansk Selskab for Musikforskning Musik, lyd og digitalisering, www.musikforskning.dk/downloads/2010_papers/program_abstract_2010.html, 2010.
- "The Real, the Virtual. . . and the Practical." i Philipsen, H., Agerbæk, L., Kampmann Walter, B., & Strange, B., Designing New Media: Learning, Communication and Innovation Copenhagen: Academica. 87-110, 2010.
- "An Examination of the Distinction between Popular and Art Music/En undersøgelse af skelnen mellem populær- og kunstmusik." Paper presented at the Annual Meeting of the Danish Philosophical Association/Dansk Filosofisk Selskabs Årsmøde 2010. Erfaring og opmærksomhed/Experience and Attention, Copenhagen, Danmark, m.nsuweb.net/dbadm/fpdf/abstracts.php, 9, 2010.
- "Music and Meaning: Duets and Dialogues." TV broadcast (in English after a short voiceover in Danish). Aabenraa, ALT: Aabenraa Lokal TV, www.aabenraa-lokal-tv.dk/wp/2010/02/15/3285, 2010.
- "Grund, C. M., & Christensen, I. F. Interview med avatar Gunhild Soderstrom", Podcast, www.forskningsnettet.dk/da/lom?q=da/lom_0309_6, Læring og medier, 2009.
- "Grund, C. M. Rundvisning med avatar Gunhild Soderstrom, Podcast, www.forskningsnettet.dk/da/lom?q=da/lom_0309_6, Læring og medier, 2009.
- "JMM: The Journal of Music and Meaning 7, Section 1, www.musicandmeaning.net, Odense: Section 1, 2009.
- "Grund, C.M & Westney, W.: Playing the Ineffable: The Romance of Musical Pragmatism." Published abstract; Paper presented at Meaning in the Arts: An Interdiscliplinary Conversation, September 11–12, 2009, Texas Tech University, Lubbock, Texas, USA.
- Editor and Webmaster, Homepage for the Research Program The Aesthetics of Music and Sound: Cross-Disciplinary Interplay between the Humanities, Technology and Musical Practice, www.soundmusicresearch.org, 2009.
- Webmaster & Editor-in-Chief. The Philosophy Meets Popular Culture Initiative: www.philpopculture.dk, 2009.
- "Pedagogy and Philosophy Viewed from the Piano Bench", Cynthia M. Grund Interviews Incoming H.C. Andersen Guest Professor William Westney." GymPæd 2.0, (2), 9-10, www.sdu.dk/~/media/Files/Om_SDU/Institutter/Ifpr/gp2/GymPaed2.ashx, 2009.
- "Subjektiv idealisme møder virtuel virkelighed: George Berkeley og Second Life", Conference: Normativitet – At komme til rette med det regelmæssige og det uregerlige/Normativity – Coming to Terms with the Regular and the Unruly.The Annual Meeting of the Danish Philosophical Association 2009/Dansk Filosofisk Selskabs Årsmøde 2009, Århus, Danmark, 27. februar 2009 – 28. februar 2009, www1.sdu.dk/dfs/aarsmoede2009/Program%20DFS%202009.pdf, s. 41-43, 2009.
- "Percipitopia: An Educational and Research Tool Utilizing Digital Content Creation and Textual Reappropriation in Second Life", Digital Content Creation: Creativity, Competence, Digital Content Creation: Creativity, Competence, Critique: The second international DREAM conference, September 18–20, www.dreamconference.dk/nyheder/Grund%2C%20Cynthia%20M.%20et%20al..pdf, Odense: University of Southern Denmark, 2008
- JMM: The Journal of Music and Meaning Vol. 6, www.musicandmeaning.net, Odense, 2008.
- "Perception and Reality in – and out – of Second Life: Second Life as a Tool for Philosophical Reflection and Instruction at the University of Southern Denmark", VISION IT – Vision for IT in Higher Education, www.eunis.dk/papers/p10.pdf, 2008.
- "Percipitopia", An experiment in museum teaching and research within the context of a rendering of Whitehall – Irish philosopher George Berkeley's American home 1729-1731 – and envirions on the virtual campus of SDU in Second Life, slurl.com/secondlife/Bifrost/89/128/33, 2008.
- "Issues of Meaning and Interpretation Raised by Diagetic versus Non-diagetic Use of Music in Television and Film", Conference: Sense Perception, Epistemology and Aesthetics/Sansning, Erkendelsesteori og Æstetik. The Annual Meeting of the Danish Philosophical Association 2008/Dansk Filosofisk Selskabs Årsmøde 2008, www1.sdu.dk/dfs/aarsmoede2008/Program%20-%20DFS%202008.pdf, Odense, 2008.
- JMM: The Journal of Music and Meaning Vol. 5, www.musicandmeaning.net, Odense, 2007.
- "How Computer Music Modeling and Retrieval Interface with Music-And-Meaning Studies: Overview of Panelists' Suggestions for Discussion Topics", Proceedings of the 2007 International Computer Music Conference, San Francisco and Copenhagen: The International Computer Music Association and Re: New-Digital Arts Forum, s. 133-136, 2007.
- JMM: The Journal of Music and Meaning Vol. 4, www.musicandmeaning.net, Odense, 2007.
- "Mad, betydning ... og så opstår musikken ud af lyd", Tankeføde – om mad, måltider og fødevarer i sammenhæng, Aarhus: Philosophia, s. 191-200, 2006.
- "Interdisciplinarity and Computer Music Modeling and Information Retrieval: When Will the Humanities Get into the Act", Computer Music Modeling and Retrieval: Lecture Notes in Computer Science, nr. 3902, Berlin-Heidelberg-New York: Springer Verlag, s. 265-273, 2006.
- "A Philosophical Wish List for Research in Music Information Retrieval", ISMIR 2006: Proceedings of the Seventh International Conference on Music Information Retrieval, Victoria: University of Victoria, s. 383-384, 2006.
- "Music Information Retrieval, Memory and Culture", Some Philosophical Remarks, Proceedings of the Sixth International Conference on Music Information Retrieval, London: Queen Mary, University of London, s. 8-12, 2005.
- "Double Jeopardy: The Interdisciplinary Study of Music and Meaning", Danish Yearbook of Musicology, Vol. 32, s. 9-14, 2004.
- "Music, Logic and Intentionality", Proceedings of the Twelfth Meeting of the FWO Research Society on Foundations of Music Research: Music and Logic, Kapitel 2, University of Ghent, 2001.
- "Værløse bymidte pakket ind i Lyrik og NTSMB: Netværk for Tværvidenskabelige studier af musik og betydning: To udgangspunkter for undersøgelsen af samspillet mellem verbal og ikkverbal betydning", Kodexbogen (bogkataloget for lyrikinstallationen) s. 15-19, 2004.
- "Om kurset i opgaveskrivning", Sandhedens sider, Vol. IX, 1999.
- "From Speech Act to Music Act: Some Thoughts on Intentionality and Music", Les Universaux en musique, Paris: Publications de la Sorbonne, s. 179-189, 1998.
- "The Emergence of Music from Sound: The View from a Combined Quasi-Realist and Fictionalist Perspective", Acta Polytechnica Scandinavica No. 91: Emergence, Complexity. Hierarchy, Organization – Selected and edited papers from ECHO III, s. 305-314, 1998.
- Constitutive Counterfactuality: The Logic of Interpretation in Metaphor and Music, Copenhagen: Askeladden, 1997.
- "Intentionality, Food and Music: A Fictionalist Approach", Metaforer i kultur og samfund, Copenhagen: Københavns Universitet Amager, s. 61-98, 1997.
- "De 12 spørgsmål: Nogle tanker om science fiction-film og filosofi", Inquirer, Nr. 59/60, 28-30, Amager: Institut for Film, TV og Kommunikation, Københavns Universitet, 1996.
- "Kierkegaard and the Musical Erotic", Danish Yearbook of Philosophy, Vol. 31, 1996.
- "Fictionalism: A Neglected Context for Studies in Musical Signification", Contemporary Music Review 1996, Vol 16, Part 7, s. 119-128, 1996.
- "Jeremy Bentham's Theory of Fictions: Some Reflections on Its Implications for Musical Semiosis and Ontology", Musical Semiotics in Growth, Bloomington and Indianapolis: Indiana University Press, s. 55-71, 1996.
- "How Philosophical Characterizations of a Musical Work Lose Sight of the Music and How It Might Be Put Back", Musical Signification: Essays in the Semiotic Theory and Analysis of Music, Berlin/New York: Mouton de Gruyter, s. 63-79, 1995.
- "Some Remarks on Computer Art and Its Ontology", In So Many Words – Philosophical Essays Dedicated to Sven Danielsson on the Occasion of His Fiftieth Birthday, Uppsala: Philosophical Society and the Department of Philosophy, University of Uppsala, s. 17-28, 1989.
- "Metaphors, Counterfactuals and Music", Essays on the Philosophy of Music, Acta Philosophica Fennica, Helsinki: The Philosophical Society of Finland, s. 28-53, 1988.
- "Notation and Its Interpretation: Music Theoretical Concepts", The Semiotic Web 86: An International Yearbook, Berlin: 484, 1987.
