= Cynthia Hall =

Cynthia Hall may refer to:

- Cynthia B. Hall (born 1951), a member of the New Mexico Public Regulation Commission
- Cynthia Holcomb Hall (1929–2011), a United States federal judge
- Cynthia Hall (scientist) (fl. 1940s), a nuclear scientist for the Manhattan Project
- Cynthia Hall, March 1971 Playboy Playmate
- Cynthia Hall, wife of Tony Hall, Baron Hall of Birkenhead, and former headmistress of The School of St Helen and St Katharine, and of Wycombe Abbey
- Cynthia Hall, wife of Florida politician Charlie Hall
