= Cynthia Chua =

Singaporean businesswoman

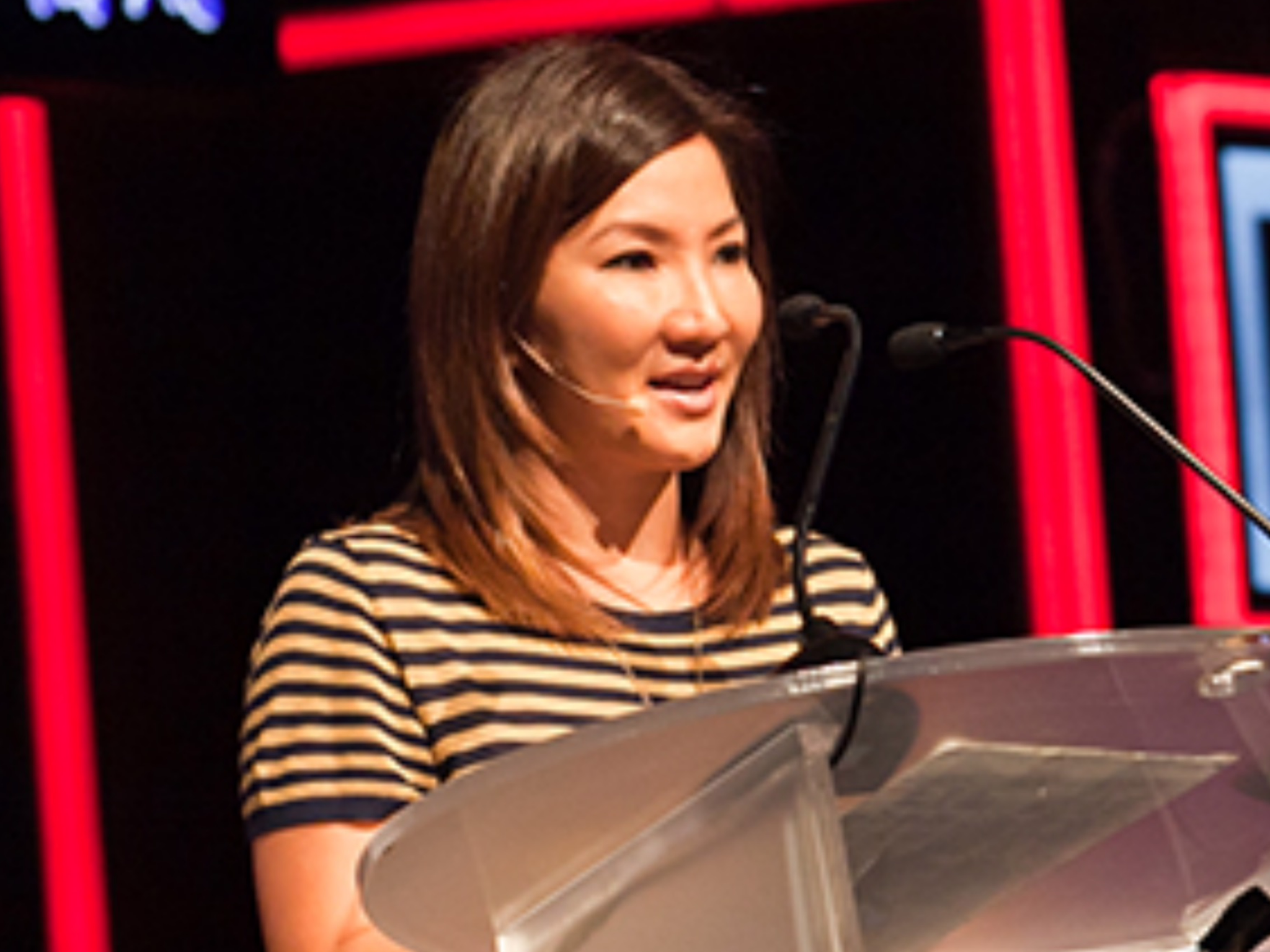
- Chua speaking about retail strategy at CapitaMalls Asia Forum in Singapore.

Spa Esprit Group Organizational founder

Personal details
- Born: 1972 (age 53–54) Singapore
- Citizenship: Singaporean
- Education: National University of Singapore
- Occupation: Businesswoman

Cynthia Chua (born 1972) is a Singaporean businesswoman who is the Founder of Spa Esprit Group. She is known as a lifestyle entrepreneur in Singapore, and was awarded the Singapore Tourism Board’s Tourism Entrepreneur of the Year in 2012.

== Business career ==
Since 1996, the group has developed beauty spas and food stores that expanded internationally to over 200 outlets and over 2000 employees. It currently focuses on London and other parts of the world to develop new businesses partly because Chua understands that Singapore presents a limited market that could restrict consistent growth in her business lines. In 2016, Chua made investments in local farming taking a specific interest on consumption patterns and lifestyle choices.

== Background ==
Chua holds a bachelor's degree in economics and statistics from the National University of Singapore. Chua previously worked in a bank and was a property agent. In 2002, she developed Singapore's first dedicated waxing salon named Strip, which has over 37 stores in the region. She was a member of the school advisory committee (2013/14) of Temasek Polytechnic.
