= Cynthia Miller-Idriss =

American sociologist

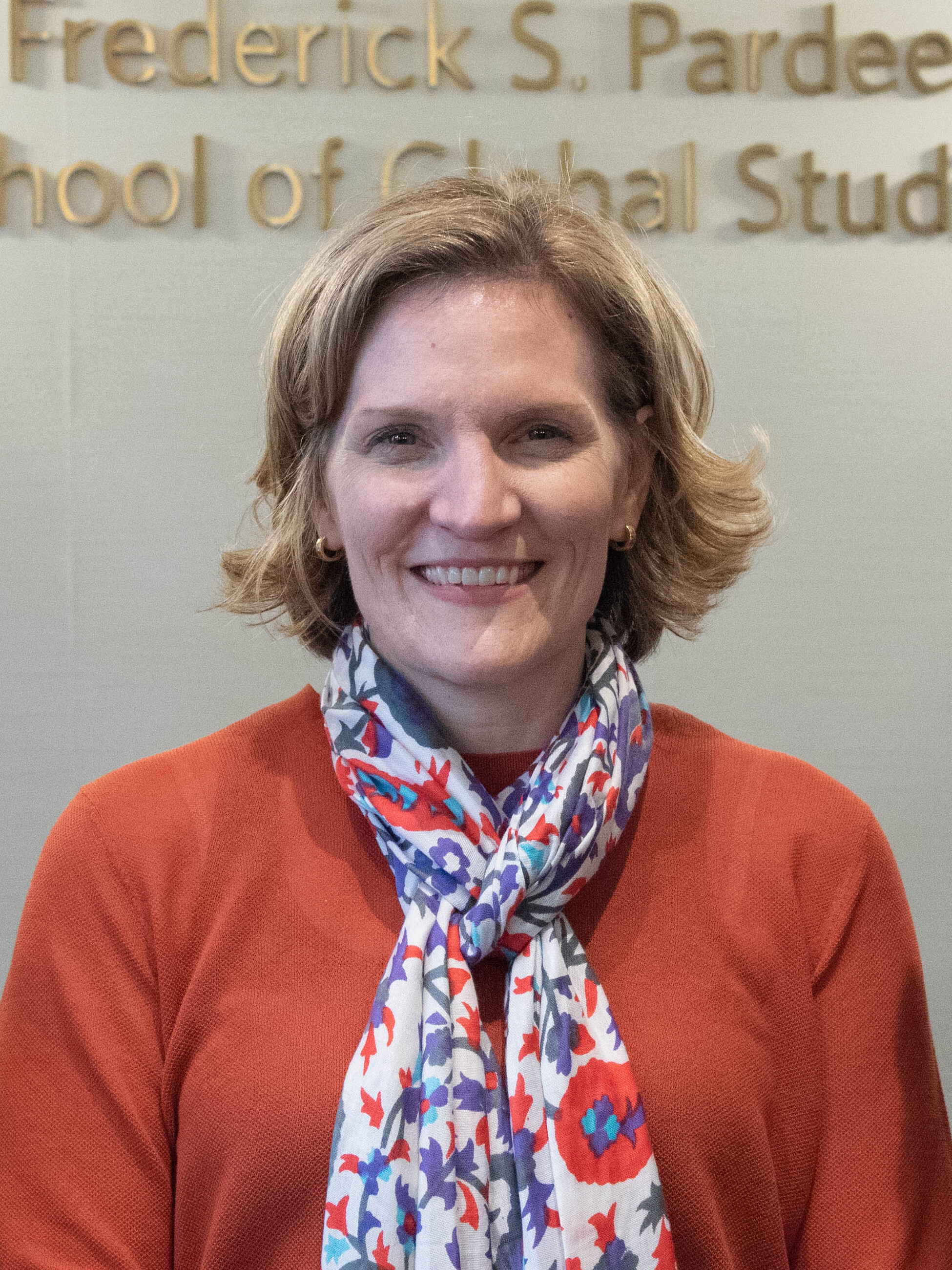
Miller-Idriss in 2018

Cynthia Miller-Idriss is an American sociologist. She is a professor in the Schools of Public Affairs and Education at American University. She is the founding director of the Polarization & Extremism Research & Innovation Lab (PERIL).

Miller-Idriss has an AB in Sociology and German Area Studies from Cornell University and a MPP in Public Policy, MA in Sociology, and PhD in Sociology, from the University of Michigan.

== Work ==
Much of Idriss's work informs against extremism. In her book, Hate in the Homeland, she states that people are becoming radicalized through social media, memes, online gaming servers and internet sites like YouTube can introduce radicalized ideas that lead to violence to younger viewers. The internet has helped different extremist groups converge despite ideological differences. Increasing political rhetoric like us-versus-them thinking can lead to increased real world political violence like assassinations. Idriss compares extremist prevention to disease prevention: identifying and dismantling pipelines of radicalization, such as teaching media literacy. Solutions include: "pre-emptive education campaigns game-style interventions."

Idriss founded PERIL, part of American University (Polarization and Extremism Research and Innovation Lab), a website devoted to stopping extremists, through education. The process is to show propaganda to inoculate participants against it. They provide short videos and education programs aimed at educators, parents, faith leaders and youth.

== Books ==
- Man Up: The New Misogyny and the Rise of Violent Extremism (Princeton University Press, 2025)
- Hate in the Homeland: The New Global Far Right (Princeton University Press, 2020)
- with Mitchell Stevens and Seteney Shami Seeing the World: How US Universities Make Knowledge in a Global Era (Princeton University Press, 2018)
- The Extreme Gone Mainstream: Commercialization and Far Right Youth Culture in Germany (Princeton University Press, 2018)
- Blood and Culture: Youth, Right-Wing Extremism, and National Belonging in Contemporary Germany (Duke University Press, 2009)

=== Editor ===
- with Hilary Pilkington Gender and the Radical and Extreme Right: Mechanisms of Transmission and the Role of Educational Interventions (Routledge, 2019)
- with Seteney Khalid Shami Middle East Studies for the New Millennium: Infrastructures of Knowledge (NYU Press, 2016)
