= Cynthia Keppel =

American nuclear physicist

Cynthia E. Keppel
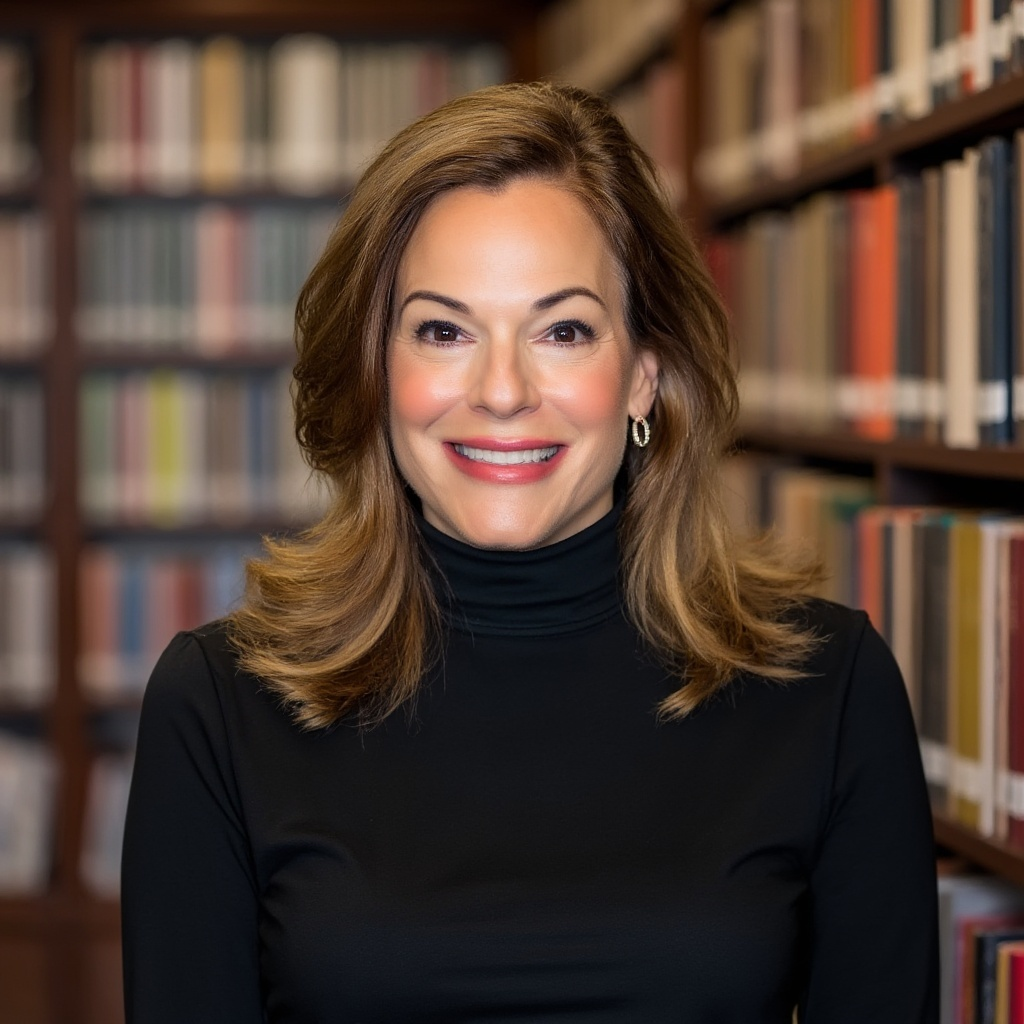
- Cynthia Keppel, official Thomas Jefferson National Accelerator Facility image in 2025.
- Education: St. John's College
- Scientific career
- Workplaces: Hampton University; Thomas Jefferson National Accelerator Facility
- Thesis: Inclusive Nucleon Resonance Electroproduction at Large Momentum Transfer (1994)

Cynthia E. Keppel was the Associate Director for Physics at the Thomas Jefferson National Accelerator Facility and a Fellow of the American Physical Society. Her research focuses on the quark-gluon structure of the nucleon, while also considering applications of nuclear physics in medicine. She was a founding member of the Hampton University Proton Therapy Institute.

== Early life and education ==
Keppel earned her Bachelor of Arts degree at St. John's College in 1984. She spent a year teaching science at the Thomas Jefferson High School for Science and Technology in Fairfax County, Virginia. Keppel worked at the United States Naval Research Laboratory where she created an early computer generated film. She considered becoming a professional race car driver, and participated in Sports Car Club of America activities. She completed her graduate training at the American University in 1995. Her advisor was Ray Arnold at the Stanford Linear Accelerator Center. She then joined the Continuous Electron Beam Accelerator Facility (CEBAF) to work in a joint position as a staff scientist and faculty member at Hampton University.

== Research and career ==
Keppel has been with the Thomas Jefferson National Accelerator Facility (Jefferson Lab, formerly CEBAF) in various capacities since 1995. Keppel performed electron scattering experiments to investigate the structure of protons and neutrons. In 2001 she founded the Hampton University Center for Advanced Medical Instrumentation, where scientists at Hampton and Jefferson Lab collaborated to bring technology developed for nuclear and particle physics to nuclear medicine applications. She was pivotal in launching the world's largest independent proton therapy facility, the Hampton University Proton Therapy Institute. She was awarded numerous grants, including a $1.3 million grant to improve breast cancer imaging and therapy. Shielded accelerated partial breast irradiation, a technology developed by Keppel and colleagues, makes post-surgical radiation more feasible for patients. Another of her patents was used in the OARtrac system, a machine which helps radiation oncologists monitor dose in therapy for cancer patients, which was awarded a Medical Device Breakthrough Award in 2018. In 2012 Keppel was named Leader of Experimental Hall A at the Thomas Jefferson National Accelerator Facility., and soon after Leader of both Halls A and C. Keppel is Co-Spokesperson of the Coordinated Theoretical-Experimental Project on Quantum Chromodynamics (CTEQ). She has served on the National Nuclear Science Advisory Committee.

Keppel was elected a Fellow of the American Physical Society in 2018, "For leadership on novel experimental techniques to study strong interactions, her contributions to CTEQ from the perspective of Nuclear Physics, and her instrumental role in founding the Hampton University Proton Therapy Center and other work applying Nuclear Physics to Medicine." Keppel delivered the 2019 American Physical Society Distinguished Lectureship on the Applications of Physics. She was awarded the honour for "pioneering work in proton therapy and for the promotion of the applications of physics to both experts and non-experts". Alongside her academic work, Keppel has mentored high school teachers about Nuclear physics, and campaigned to bring recognition to African-American and Hispanic physicists. In 2019 Keppel gave a TEDx talk in Charlottesville, Virginia. This TEDx talk was titled "Nuclear Science from Quarks to Cancer." In this talk she explains why physicists are fascinated in particle physics.

Keppel's employment at the Thomas Jefferson National Accelerator Facility was terminated in November 2025. In July 2026, she filed a wrongful termination lawsuit against multiple defendants, alleging gender discrimination.

=== Awards and honors ===
Her awards and honors include;

- 2000 VA Outstanding Faculty Award
- 2010 Innovate Hampton Roads High Tech Leadership Award
- 2011 Virginia Outstanding Scientist Award
- 2016 American Physical Society Francis G. Slack Award
- 2019 American Physical Society Forum on Industrial and Applied Physics Distinguished Lectureship Award
- 2019 Alumni Association Award of Merit St. John's College
- 2020 U.S. Department of Energy Distinguished Scientist Fellowship Award

Keppel holds several patents for radiation therapy and diagnostic imaging.
