= Cynthia Burek =

Professor of Geoconservation

- Education: City, University of London (MS); University of Leicester (BS, PhD)
- Scientific career
- Workplaces: University of Chester; Wrexham Glyndŵr University; Keele University

Cynthia Veronica Burek is a Professor of Geoconservation at the University of Chester. She serves on the steering group of the Geodiversity Action Plan (UKGAP) and as a Director of the British Federation of Women Graduates.

== Early life and education ==
Burek studied geology and geography at the University of Leicester. She moved to the City, University of London for a master's degree in information science which she completed in 1971. Burek returned to the University of Leicester for her doctoral studies, completing her PhD in 1978. Her doctoral research considered the impact of the ice age on sedimentology and geochemistry in Derbyshire. After earning her doctorate she moved to the United States upstate New York Syracuse university. Returning in 1980, she worked as a tutor for the Earth Science department of the Open University in Wales and the North West for 37 years. Later she taught in the dept of applied geology at Staffordshire University and NEWI, She started in University of Chester in 1994 part time and spent the rest of her academic life there

== Research and career ==
Burek taught environmental sciences at Wrexham Glyndŵr University (1993–2015) and worked for the Earth Science Education Unit in Keele University from 2005 to 2015. She moved to the University of Chester in 1994, where she was the first person in the country to be made Professor of Geoconservation in 2005. Her work involves limestone pavement conservation and geology. Burek works on environmental issues, sustainable development and habitat conservation. She led the University of Chester Environmental Task Force. Her research has considered the impact of the voluntary sector in geoconservation. She has pioneered the research on the role of Local Geodiversity Action Plans (LGAPs) and Regionally Important Geodiversity Sites (RIGS) in driving geoconservation in Wales. Burek was part of the National Lottery Heritage Fund project on the salt area of Cheshire Saltscape

In 2016, Burek attended the International Conference on UNESCO Global Geoparks where she represented Anglesey Geopark: GeoMôn. Burek served as Deputy Director of the Centre for Science Communication. She has appeared on BBC Radio Wales.

=== Public engagement and diversity ===
Burek has campaigned for women scientists throughout her career. She has been a long time member of the British Federation of Women Graduates, serving as their Coordinator for International Relations. She serves on the board of the Funds for Women Graduates. In 2005 Burek led The Role of Women in the History of Geology conference organised by the History of Geology Group at the Geological Society of London. In 2014 Burek led the agreement of memorandum of understanding between the University of Chester and the British Federation of Women Graduates. Burek led a study into the public awareness of women scientists across Europe, and found that 1 in 4 people could name no women scientists. She works to communicate role of women geologists throughout history, and delivered the 2015 British Federation of Women Graduates Sybil Campbell Annual Lecture. In 2017 she was elected a Director of the British Federation of Women Graduates. She was selected to feature as one of fourteen women to be included in "Raising Horizons exhibition"; a national touring exhibition of photographs of women scientists coordinated by archaeologist Brenna Hassett and photographer Leonora Saunders. In 2019, she ran a conference organised by the History of Geology Group at the Geological Society of London to celebrate the centenary of the first female Fellows of the Geological Society and co-edited a book of the proceedings of that conference, published in 2021.

=== Selected publications ===
Her publications include;

- Burek, Cynthia V. (2005). History of palaeobotany. Geological Society of London. ISBN 9781862391741.
- Burek, Cynthia V. (2007). The role of women in the history of geology. Geological Society of London. ISBN 9781862392274.
- Burek, Cynthia V. (2008). The History of Geoconservation. Geological Society of London. ISBN 9781862395480.
- Burek, Cynthia V. (2008). "The role of the voluntary sector in the evolving geoconservation movement". Geological Society, London, Special Publications. 300 (1): 61–89. Bibcode:2008GSLSP.300...61B. doi:10.1144/SP300.6. S2CID 140586235.
- Burek, Cynthia V. (2009). "The first female Fellows and the status of women in the Geological Society of London". Geological Society, London, Special Publications. 317 (1): 373–407. Bibcode:2009GSLSP.317..373B. doi:10.1144/SP317.21. S2CID 128719787.
