= Cynthia D. Belar =

Scientist

- Occupation: Professor Emerita at the University of Florida Health Science Center
- Awards: Inaugural recipient of the Outstanding Contributions to Clinical Health Psychology (2000). Career Service Contributions to Health Psychology (2007) Paul Nelson Outstanding Contributions to Education and Training Award (2008)

Academic background
- Education: Ohio University (1974)

Cynthia D. Belar is a scientist known for her contributions to clinical psychology with specific focus on health psychology, clinical service, and education. She is a Professor Emerita at the University of Florida Health Science Center.

Among a multitude of awards, Belar received the 2008 Paul Nelson Outstanding Contributions to Education and Training Award for her contributions to psychology at the national level. Belar received the 2007 Career Service Contributions to Health Psychology, and was the 2000 Inaugural recipient of the Outstanding Contributions to Clinical Health Psychology from the Association of Psychologists in Academic Health Centers. She received the 1997 Educator Award from the Association of Psychologists in Academic Health Centers, and the 1996 American Psychological Association Award for Distinguished Contributions to Education and Training in Psychology. The Society for Health Psychology instituted an award in her honor in 2014, "Cynthia D. Belar Award for Excellence in Health Psychology Education and Training Archives" of which she is also the first recipient for her contribution to education and training programs in health psychology.

Belar is the co-author of Clinical Health Psychology in Medical Settings: A practitioners Guidebook, which she wrote in 1995 with William W. Deardorff, to provide an overview of the clinical health field and the issues that many people face.

== Biography ==
Belar received her PhD from Ohio University in 1974. She received board certification in clinical psychology, and clinical health psychology. Between 1974-1983 and 1990–2000, Belar was the director of clinical psychology doctoral and internship programs at the University of Florida Health Science Center where she is credited with developing clinical psychology programs at the doctoral and post-doctoral levels. In 1984–1990, Belar served as the Chief Psychologist, and Clinical Director of Behavioral Medicine at the Kaiser Permanente Medical Care Program and established many integrated health programs.

Within the American Psychological Association Divisions, Belar is a fellow of Division 12 and Division 38 . She is also a member of Division 35. Belar served as the president of the APA Division of Health Psychology and the American Board of Clinical Health Psychology. She worked for 14 years as the executive director of the American Psychological Association's Education Directorate and retired from this position in 2014. Among her achievements, Belar is credited for establishing the Graduate Psychology Education program, facilitating the development of guidelines for teaching high school psychology, and the development of principles for undergraduate psychology education. Belar served as the interim chief executive officer of the American Psychological Association between 2016 and 2017 after the previous CEO, Norman B. Anderson retired. In 2016 Belar became a Council of Representatives member who represented the APA Board of Directors.

== Research ==
Belar's work is in the field of clinical service, education, and training. Her research interests include psychosocial aspects of illnesses, applied psychophysiology, and reproductive endocrinology. She believes that psychology graduate education involves training in how to conduct of scientific research, clinical practice, and the integration of research and practice.

Belar participated in writing the APA statement in response to the “Joint principles: Integrating behavioral health care into the patient-centered medical home” which shared concerns about the lack of reference to behavioral health care in the 2007 Joint Principles article. One article that Belar is most cited for is the "Self-Assessment in Clinical Health Psychology: A Model for Ethical Expansion of Practice" which proposes a self-assessment to identify if individual practitioners are ready to serve patients as psychology shifts from being a mental health profession to a health profession.

== Representative publications ==
- Belar, C. D., & Perry, N. W. (1992). The National Conference on Scientist-Practitioner Education and Training for the Professional Practice of Psychology. American Psychologist, 47(1), 71.
- Anderson, N. B., Belar, C. D., Cubic, B. A., Garrison, E. G., Johnson, S. B., & Kaslow, N. J. (2014). Statement of the American Psychological Association in response to the “Joint principles: Integrating behavioral health care into the patient-centered medical home”. Families, Systems, & Health, 32(2), 141–142.
- Belar, C. D., Brown, R. A., Hersch, L. E., Hornyak, L. M., Rozensky, R. H., Sheridan, E. P., Brown, R. T., & Reed, G. W. (2003). Self-Assessment in Clinical Health Psychology: A Model for Ethical Expansion of Practice. Prevention & Treatment, 6(1). Article 25a.
- Belar, C. D. (2000). Scientist-practitioner≠ science+ practice: Boulder is bolder. American Psychologist, 55(2), 249.
