= Cynthia Huffman =

American mathematician

Cynthia Jean (Woodward) Huffman is an American mathematician and mathematics educator who works as University Professor of Mathematics at Pittsburg State University. Originally focusing on computational commutative algebra, her research interests have shifted to the history of mathematics and ethnomathematics. She is known for incorporating her interest in handbell ringing and her collection of clothing from her foreign travels into her mathematics classes.

== Education and career ==
Huffman is the daughter of an accounting professor at Pittsburg State University, and majored in mathematics education at Pittsburg State University, where she graduated in 1986, continuing for a master's degree in 1987. As an undergraduate, she was also a member of the Pittsburg State University volleyball team. She continued her studies at New Mexico State University, where she completed her Ph.D. in 1994 with the dissertation An Algorithm for Suslin's Stability Theorem, supervised by Reinhard C. Laubenbacher.

After completing her doctorate, she immediately returned to Pittsburg State University as an assistant professor of mathematics. She became associate professor in 1999, full professor in 2006, and University Professor in 2013.

== Recognition ==
Huffman was the 2015 recipient of the Award for Distinguished College or University Teaching of Mathematics of the Kansas Section of the Mathematical Association of America. She is a two-time recipient of the Robert K. Ratzlaff Outstanding Faculty Award of the Pittsburg State University Student Government Association.
