= Cynthia Santana =

Former American television news reporter and anchor

Cynthia Santana is a former American television news reporter and anchor.

== Early life and education ==
She was born and raised along the Arizona-Mexico border, Santana earned a bachelor's degree from Northern Arizona University in journalism and broadcast production in 1993.

== Professional career ==
Santana began her professional career in radio, and then shifted to television, taking a job at KNAZ-TV in Flagstaff, Arizona, where she worked from 1992 until September 1993. Santana then worked as a weekday news anchor at KOLD-TV in Tucson, Arizona from 1993 until 1996. From 1996 until October 2001, Santana was a weekend anchor and primary weekday fill-in anchor at WNYW-TV in New York City.

In January 2002, Santana joined WBBM-TV in Chicago as the station's weekend co-anchor. In June 2003, Santana resigned from WBBM.

In 2004, Santana became a producer, writer and narrator for Morgan Howard Productions, a visual communications company in Kirkland, Washington owned by her husband. She is the mother of Roan Abraham Howard, who currently attends Stanford University.

Santana currently works as the Communications Manager at the Seattle Office of Labor Standards.
