= Cynthia Chestek =

American neuroscientist

Cynthia (Cindy) Chestek is an American biomedical engineer and Associate Professor of Bioengineering and Neuroscience at the University of Michigan. She is an associate chair of research for Biomedical Engineering in the College of Engineering at University of Michigan where she studies brain and nerve control of finger movements, as well as high-density carbon fiber electrode arrays. She is also an associate professor for robotics, biomedical engineering, electrical engineering and computer science.

== Background and education ==
Chestek received her Bachelor's of Science and Master's of Science degrees in electrical engineering from Case Western Reserve University in 2005, as well as her doctorate in electrical engineering from Stanford University in 2010. Chestek joined the University of Michigan's faculty in 2012.

After entering her undergraduate studies on a physics track, Chestek pivoted to electrical engineering to follow her interest in electricity and programming. She joined a neuroscience lab, where she was introduced to neuronal recording, and decided to pursue brain-machine interfaces.

== Career highlights ==
At the University of Michigan's College of Engineering, Chestek studies prosthetic hand control via implanted electrodes, individual finger control, and carbon fiber electrodes. Additionally, her team at the University of Michigan has come up with a way for amputees to control prosthetic devices using their brain waves. Her work also includes implantable wireless neural interface systems that reduce infection risk and expand recording capabilities in brain machine interfaces. Her lab has also developed carbon fiber electrode arrays that improve long term neural recording performance.

Chestek began researching Aplysia californica, studying brain-body systems and circuit-level control. She was a research assistant for the Stanford Department of Neurosurgery's Braingate 2 clinical trial from 2010 to 2012. Braingate 2 clinical trial was a major research initiative focused on enabling individuals with paralysis to control external devices using neural signals, advancing the development of brain and computer interface technologies. Chestek has contributed to 169 scientific publications from 2004 to 2026. Chestek attributes her career in part to her Ph.D. mentor, Krishna Shenoy, who was instrumental in guiding her to professorship. She joined the University of Michigan as a faculty member in 2012 and is currently the Associate Chair for Research in Biomedical Engineering and an Associate Professor of Biomedical Engineering. Chestek is a Miller Faculty Scholar at the University of Michigan

== Awards and honors ==
Chestek was elected to the American Institute for Medical and Biological Engineering (AIMBE) College of Fellows, a non-profit organization that represents approximately 50,000 medical and biomedical engineers and academic institutions, private industry, and professional engineering societies. She also served on the jury for the BCI Award in 2022. Chestek is also the author of 87 full-length scientific articles Additional honors include the Wise-Najafi Prize for Engineering Excellence in the Miniature World (2020, 2026) from the University of Michigan College of Engineering, designation as a Miller Faculty Scholar (2022), the Department of Biomedical Engineering Award (2018) at the University of Michigan, and the McKnight Foundation Technology Award (2014).
