= Murder of Cynthia Bolshaw =

1983 murder in England

- Part of "Beauty in the Bath" murder
- Location: United Kingdom
- Date: 1983
- Attack type: Murder
- Deaths: 1
- Victim: Cynthia Bolshaw
- Convicted: John Taft

Cynthia Bolshaw was a British woman who was murdered in 1983 in a crime known as the "Beauty in the Bath" murder. Her murderer, John Taft, was caught 16 years later following breakthroughs in DNA evidence. He later attempted to overturn the conviction.
