= Cynthia Morrison =

American escapologist and strongwoman

Cynthia Morrison, International Women's Jousting Champion

Cynthia Morrison aka "Cindini" is an escapologist and strongwoman who is based in Palm Beach, Florida, USA. In 1994, she was the first woman to compete against professional athletes at the Highland games in Scotland. She has competed in powerlifting, and track & field events. Morrison founded the Palm Beach Jousting club, and has won jousting events. She is also a knife thrower, playwright and bull fighter.

== Sporting titles and awards ==
=== Powerlifting ===
- World Natural Powerlifting Federation (WNPF) 1992 Submaster World Champion; world records in Squat, Bench Press, Deadlift, and Total.
- American Powerlifting Alliance (APA) 1992 Submaster National Champion and 1992 Florida Woman Powerlifter of the Year, Florida state deadlift record.
- Natural Athlete Strength Association (NASA) Bench Press Record, 1990.
- American Drug Free Powerlifting Association (ADFPA) 1989 Miss Georgia Ironman
- United States Powerlifting Federation (USPF) 1988 Region III Champion

=== Track and Field ===
- Two-time National champion, #20 weight throw (W35), USA Track & Field (USATF) masters indoor championships, 1997 & 1998.
- American record holder, #20 weight (W35), 1998.
- USATF #1 ranking, #20 weight throw (W35), 1997.
- USATF Masters Three time "All-American" standard of excellence, #20 weight throw (W35), 1996; #35 superweight throw (W35), 1998, #20 weight throw (W45), 2005.

=== Jousting ===
- 2000 AJA International Women's Jousting Champion.
- 1999 AJA International Women's Jousting Champion.

=== Scottish Highland Games ===
- Ambassador Award Oscar Heidenstam Foundation. London: March 2000.
- First woman to compete in Scotland in the heavy athletics (turning the caber, stone throw, #28 weight throw, hammer throw), 1994.
- Citizen Patriot Award 2000 Presented at American Legion Post 269
