= Cynthia Eagle Russett =

American historian (1937–2013)

- Born: February 1, 1937
- Died: December 5, 2013 (aged 76); New Haven, Connecticut, U.S.

Academic background
- Education: Yale University; Trinity Washington University

Academic work
- Discipline: History
- Institutions: Yale University

Cynthia Eagle Russett (February 1, 1937 – December 5, 2013) was an American historian, noted for her studies of 19th century American intellectual history, and women and gender.

Russett was born Cynthia Eagle in Pittsburgh, Pennsylvania, on February 1, 1937. She studied history as an undergraduate at Trinity College in Washington, D.C., earning a bachelor's degree, and then did graduate work at Yale University, earning a Master's from Yale in 1959 and a Ph.D. from Yale in 1964. Her dissertation was awarded Yale's highest honor for American history dissertations, the George Washington Eggleston Prize.

She joined the Yale faculty in 1967, and was eventually appointed the Larnard Professor of History.

Russett's spouse was a fellow Yale faculty member, Bruce Russett, and the couple had four children together.

== Notable works ==
- The Concept of Equilibrium in American Social Thought (1968)
- Darwin in America: The Intellectual Response, 1865–1912 (1976)
- Sexual Science: The Victorian Construction of Womanhood (1989, Harvard University Press; winner, Berkshire Conference of Women Historians Annual Book Award)
- Second to None: A Documentary History of American Women (1993), edited with Ruth Barnes Moynihan and Laurie Crumpacker
- The Extraordinary Mrs. R: A Friend Remembers Eleanor Roosevelt (1999, with William Turner Levy)
