= Cynthia Osborne =

American family researcher

- Scientific career
- Education: Princeton University, Harvard Kennedy School, Claremont Graduate University
- Fields: Social policy, demography, poverty, child policy, family policy, early childhood, inequality
- Workplaces: Vanderbilt University
- Website: https://peabody.vanderbilt.edu/bio/cynthia-osborne/

Cynthia Osborne is a family researcher who is a professor of early childhood education and policy in the Department of Leadership, Policy and Organizations at Peabody College at Vanderbilt University. Osborne is the founder and executive director of the national Prenatal-to-3 Policy Impact Center.

== Education ==
- Ph.D. in Demography and Public Affairs, Princeton University, (2003)
- MPP, Kennedy School of Government, Harvard University, (1999)
- M.A. in Education, Claremont Graduate University, (1995)
- B.A. in Economics and Psychology, Claremont McKenna College, (1991)

== Academic career ==
Prior to her career in academia, Osborne was an economic analyst with Analysis Group, Inc. from 1991 to 1994 and then a teacher and administrator at Foothill Middle School in Azusa, California from 1994 to 1997.

Osborne joined the faculty of the Lyndon B. Johnson School of Public Affairs in 2005 and was appointed associate dean for academic strategies in 2018. In 2011, she founded the Child and Family Research Partnership, a nonpartisan research center on policy issues related to children and their parents. In 2019, she launched the 50-state focused Prenatal-to-3 Policy Impact Center and its annual Prenatal-to-3 State Policy Roadmap and Prenatal-to-3 State Policy Clearinghouse.

== Other professional activities ==
She was previously director of the Project on Education Effectiveness and Quality, and the Chair of the Responsible Fatherhood working group for the Fatherhood Research and Practice Network (FRPN) of the federal Office of Planning, Research and Evaluation.

== Publications ==
Her most cited publications are:

- Osborne C, McLanahan S. Partnership instability and child well‐being. Journal of Marriage and Family. 2007 Nov;69(4):1065-83. According to Google Scholar, it has been cited 618 times.
- Osborne C, Manning WD, Smock PJ. Married and cohabiting parents’ relationship stability: A focus on race and ethnicity. Journal of Marriage and Family. 2007 Dec;69(5):1345-66. According to Google Scholar, this article has been cited 284 times.
- Berger LM, Carlson MJ, Bzostek SH, Osborne C. Parenting practices of resident fathers: The role of marital and biological ties. Journal of Marriage and Family. 2008 Aug;70(3):625-39. According to Google Scholar, this article has been cited 232 times.
- Osborne C, Berger LM, Magnuson K. Family structure transitions and changes in maternal resources and well-being. Demography. 2012 Feb 1;49(1):23-47. According to Google Scholar, this article has been cited 189 times.
