= Cinthya Marabá =

Brazilian politician (born 1994)

Member of the Legislative Assembly of Bahia
- Incumbent
- Assumed office 1 February 2027

Personal details
- Born: 21 November 1994 (age 31)
- Party: Liberal Party

Cinthya Nunes Faria Borges (born 21 November 1994), better known as Cinthya Marabá, is a Brazilian politician who was elected member of the Legislative Assembly of Bahia in 2026. From 2025 to 2026, she served as secretary of citizenship of Luís Eduardo Magalhães.
