= Cynthia Chapple =

American research chemist

Cynthia Chapple is an American research chemist and non-profit executive. Chapple is the founder and managing director of Black Girls Do STEM. This program was created with a mission to increase curiosity through deliberate education access and opportunities in science, engineering, and mathematics.

== Early life and education ==
Chapple grew up in the South Side of Chicago, Illinois with her parents and seven siblings. Chapple's father was a security guard, while her mother worked as a nursing assistant. She first encountered a large divide when she attended a math course at the University of Illinois Chicago, where she was one of the only black students. At fifteen she was accepted into a biology program at Purdue University. Chapple earned her Bachelors of Science in Forensic and Investigative Science, as well as a Bachelors of Art in Chemistry.

She earned her Masters degree at Southern Illinois University Edwardsville in chemistry. While pursuing her education, Chapple faced racism and isolation for being a black woman.

== Black Girls Do STEM ==
Before establishing Black Girls Do STEM (BGDS), Chapple worked for ELANTAS PDG Inc. as a senior chemical researcher.

Chapple is the founder and director of Black Girls Do STEM (BGDS). Black Girls Do STEM was founded in 2018 in St. Louis, Missouri. Chapple's experience as a minority in her STEM classes and the workplace, led her to found BGDS while working on her masters in 2015.

In 2018, BGDS was officially starting up their first after-school classes. The program is geared towards black girls in grades six- twelve from inner-cities. During each session, Chapple creates an immersive experience for the girls to get hands on with STEM activities. These activities span from a range of different STEM ideas, but also incorporate everyday life: recipes, bus routes, astrology, makeup, and more. According to a report from 2022, Black Girls Do STEM has reached more than sixty local girls, seven different school districts, and thirteen community partners, and been the receiver of three grant funders. As Black Girls Do STEM has grown over the years, Chapple has been able to recruit many mentors to join her team. All of these mentors are in the field of STEM, and Chapple uses this fact to introduce different areas of STEM to the girls.

Chapple has spoken out against "photoshop Diversity" in an interview with POCIT after and incident at a US university where she was asked to be in a photo with a team she was not directly a part of.

== Awards and honors ==
- 2026 Deborah Patterson Award (Broadening Participation in STEM).
