= Cynthia Carnes =

American pharmacologist and academic administrator

Cynthia A. Carnes is an American pharmacologist and academic administrator who researches arrhythmias. She is the senior associate vice president for research operations and a professor of outcomes and translational science at Ohio State University. In 2023 Carnes was awarded Fellow of American Association for the Advancement of Science.

== Education and career ==
Carnes earned a B.S. in pharmacy at the University of Texas at Austin in 1983. She completed a Pharm.D. and residency at the University of Utah and University of Utah Hospital in 1988. She received a Ph.D. in pharmacology and veterinary clinical sciences at the Ohio State University (OSU) in 1996. At OSU, she conducted a medical biochemistry postdoctoral fellowship.

Carnes researches arrhythmias and provides health care in antiarrhythmic medication monitoring. At Ohio State University college of pharmacy, she is a professor of outcomes and translational science and a senior associate dean for research and graduate studies. On July 5, 2022, Carnes became the senior associate vice president for research operations. In 2023, she was elected a fellow of the American Association for the Advancement of Science.
