= Cynthia Coffman =

Cynthia Coffman can refer to:

- Cynthia Coffman (politician) (born 1961), lawyer and politician from the state of Colorado
- Cynthia Coffman (murderer) (born 1962), convicted murderer from the state of California
