= Cynthia Phillips =

Cynthia Phillips may refer to:

- Cynthia A. Phillips, American computer scientist at Sandia National Laboratories
- Cynthia B. Phillips (born 1973), American planetary scientist at the Jet Propulsion Laboratory and author of science popularization books
- Cynthia Kieras Phillips (1954–2015), American plasma physicist at the Princeton Plasma Physics Laboratory
- Cynthia Phillips, British Labour politician, candidate in 2022 City and County of Swansea Council election
- Cynthia Phillips, actress in 1988 American comedy film Casual Sex?
- Cynthia Phillips, American convicted murderer profiled in a 2020 episode of true crime television series Snapped
- Cynthia Phillips, fictional character in American television drama Being Mary Jane
