= Cynthia Lockhart =

American artist

- Born: 1952 (age 73–74); Cincinnati, Ohio
- Known for: textile art
- Website: cynthialockhartartist.com

Cynthia Lockhart (born 1952, Cincinnati, Ohio) is an artist known for textile art. Lockhart taught at the University of Cincinnati's Design, Art, Architecture, and Planning (DAAP) for twenty five years, retiring as professor emerita. Her work is influenced by her African ancestry, as well as nature, fashion, music, dance, and travel. In 2019 she had a solo exhibition entitled Journey to Freedom: Art Quilts by Cynthia Lockhart at the Taft Museum of Art. Her work, Created To Be Me, was acquired by the Smithsonian American Art Museum as part of the Renwick Gallery's 50th Anniversary Campaign.

== Career ==
Lockhart received a B.S. in Fashion Design from the University of Cincinnati in 1975, and returned to their College of Design, Architecture, Art, and Planning in 1999 for her master's degree in Design. Before becoming a textile artist, she worked in the fashion industry for over ten years, specializing in handbags and garments. As a professor at the University of Cincinnati, she taught Fiber Art Fashion, Art of Jewelry & Leather Accessory Design, and Masters of Design Professional Development Seminar courses. In 2004, her work was featured in the Gallery of the American Bible Society's exhibition titled Threads of Faith: Recent Work From the Women of Color Quilters Network. In 2011, the Aronoff Center for the Arts celebrated her with a solo exhibition called Fibercations.

== Awards ==
Lockhart received the Ohio Arts Council Individual Excellence Award in 2021.
