= Cynthia Frisina =

American non-profit executive

Cynthia Frisina was recognized by the White House as a Champion of Change for her work in providing opportunities in adaptive sports to girls with disabilities.
