= Cynthia Prieto Conti =

Paraguayan academic and politician

Maria Cynthia Prieto Conti de Alegre is a Paraguayan academic and politician. She became the first woman cabinet minister in Paraguay when she was appointed Minister of Public Health under President Andrés Rodríguez.

== Life ==
In 1985 Prieto Conti was appointed a professor in the new philosophy faculty at Universidad Nacional del Este. Prieto Conti was appointed Paraguay's Minister of Public Health and Social Welfare on 18 November 1989. She held the post until 15 August 1993, when she was succeeded by Cándido Núñez León.
