= Cynthia Kenny =

British painter (1929–2021)

- Born: 1 May 1929; Wakefield, England
- Died: 22 April 2021 (aged 91)

Cynthia Kenny (1 May 1929 – 22 April 2021) was a British painter known for her sketches, watercolours and oil paintings of the skyline, buildings and landscape in and around Wakefield. Cynthia's artistic talent was noticed at a young age and she went on to work at the West Riding County Architects Department. She studied part-time at Wakefield Art College. She had a particular interest in drawing what she described as 'dwelling places' and her work provided a record of the changing city of Wakefield. In the early 1970s a pen and ink and watercolour drawing of Garden Street (Westgate) Wakefield was the first of a number of her works to be acquired by Wakefield Art Gallery for its permanent collection.

In November 2004 a major retrospective of her work to date was held at Wakefield Art Gallery entitled Cynthia Kenny - Wakefield and Beyond 50 Years - A Visual Journey.

Cynthia continued to be actively involved in the local Wakefield Community. In the mid-1980s she established the Cynthia Kenny Handwriting Competition to inspire calligraphic skills in school children.
