= Cynthia Bir =

American academic

Cynthia Bir (or "Cindy Bir") is a Professor and Chair in the Department of Biomedical Engineering at Wayne State University and also an Emmy-award-winning television producer.

== Biography ==
Bir received a PhD in Biomedical Engineering from Wayne State University in 2000. She then was on the faculty of Wayne State, rising to the rank of Professor Biomedical Engineering, before going to the Keck School of Medicine in 2013. In 2020, she return to Wayne State as Chair of the Biomedical Engineering Department, in Detroit, MI.

== Professional work ==
She has been a leading engineer of National Geographic's Fight Science, and is the leading engineer and a producer of its spinoff, ESPN's Sport Science. She has contributed to Dancing with the Stars, was included in the 2013 Amsterdam World Science Festival, and helped crash a full-size Boeing 727 plane documented by the Discover Channel.

Bir's specialty is the prevention of injury from nonlethal forces, such as impact of rubber bullets and proximity to explosions. In 2013, she joined the Keck/USC subdivision of Center for Trauma, Violence, and Injury Prevention as a professor of research. She has received various scholastic and secular awards including two Emmys (one of them for her research work on Sport Science). She is a member of the NATO Human Factors and Medicine panel, dedicated to the furthering of human health and protection through science, technology, and exchange of information.
