= Cynthia Holz =

American-born Canadian author (born 1950)

Cynthia Holz (born 1950 in New York City, United States) is an American-born Canadian author. She graduated in English in 1971 from Queens College, City University of New York. She moved to Toronto, Ontario, Canada in 1976 while working as the Canadian correspondent for Business Week magazine. She began publishing short stories in 1980 in literary journals and anthologies such as The Malahat Review and The Fiddlehead. She has written essays and book reviews for The Globe and Mail, the Ottawa Citizen, Quill & Quire and the National Post. She has published five novels and one collection of short stories. Her latest novel, Benevolence, was released in Spring 2011 by Knopf Canada.

She spent almost twenty years teaching creative writing at Ryerson University (now Toronto Metropolitan University).

== Bibliography ==
=== Novels ===
Cynthia Holz on Bookbits radio talks about Benevolence.

- Onlyville, The Porcupine's Quill, 1994, ISBN 0-88984-178-0
- The Other Side, Second Story Press, 1997, ISBN 1-896764-01-0
- Semi Detached, Key Porter Books, 1999, ISBN 1-894433-00-9 (also published in England by Piatkus Publishers, 2000, ISBN 0-7499-3207-4)
- A Good Man, Thomas Allen Publishers, 2003, ISBN 0-88762-118-X
- Benevolence, Knopf Canada, 2011, ISBN 0-307-39889-7

=== Short stories ===
- Home Again, Random House Canada, 1989, ISBN 0-394-22031-5
