= Cynthia Ross Friedman =

Canadian botanist (1970 or 1971 – 2018)

Cynthia Ross Friedman FRSA
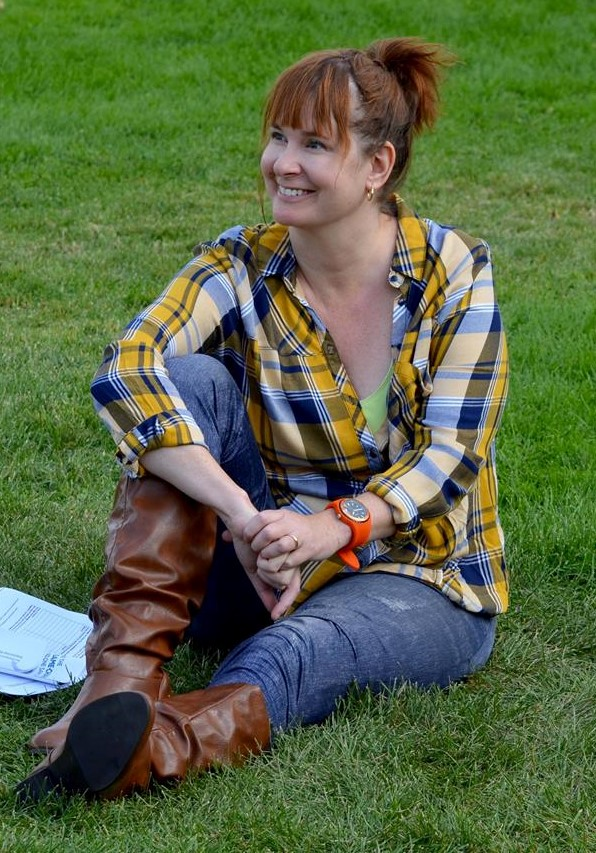
- Ross Friedman in 2015
- Born: Cynthia Ross; 1970/1971; Winnipeg, Manitoba, Canada
- Died: 24 December 2018 (age 47); Penticton, British Columbia, Canada
- Other name: Cindy Ross Friedman
- Spouse: Tom Friedman (m. 2007)

Academic background
- Education: University of Manitoba

Academic work
- Discipline: Biology
- Sub-discipline: Botany
- Institutions: Thompson Rivers University
- Main interests: Arceuthobium americanum

Cynthia "Cindy" Ross Friedman FRSA (1970 or 1971 – 24 December 2018) was a professor in biological sciences at Thompson Rivers University in Kamloops, British Columbia, Canada. She was inducted into the inaugural cohort of the Royal Society of Canada's College of New Scholars, Artists, and Scientists in 2014 and as a fellow of the Royal Society of Arts in 2016.

== Research ==
In a Nature Communications paper, her research group showed that the parasitic flowering plant Arceuthobium americanum (Lodegpole pine dwarf mistletoe) undergoes thermogenesis (internal heat generation) to explosively discharge its seeds.

== Media appearances and activism ==
She was on national radio and television in many instances not only to discuss her team's research but also to act as a spokesperson for a coalition of concerned community groups opposed to the proposed KGHM Ajax mine, a copper-gold open-pit mine project proposed to be located within 1 km of the Kamloops city boundary.

== Music ==
Ross Friedman was also a keyboardist, singer, and songwriter who played in a Kamloops Latin ensemble called Caliente, in rock bands and as a solo act. Her music had been favorably reviewed in Winnipeg.

== Personal life ==
Ross Friedman died on 24 December 2018 at the age of 47 from an aortic dissection.
