= Cynthia Arrieu-King =

American poet

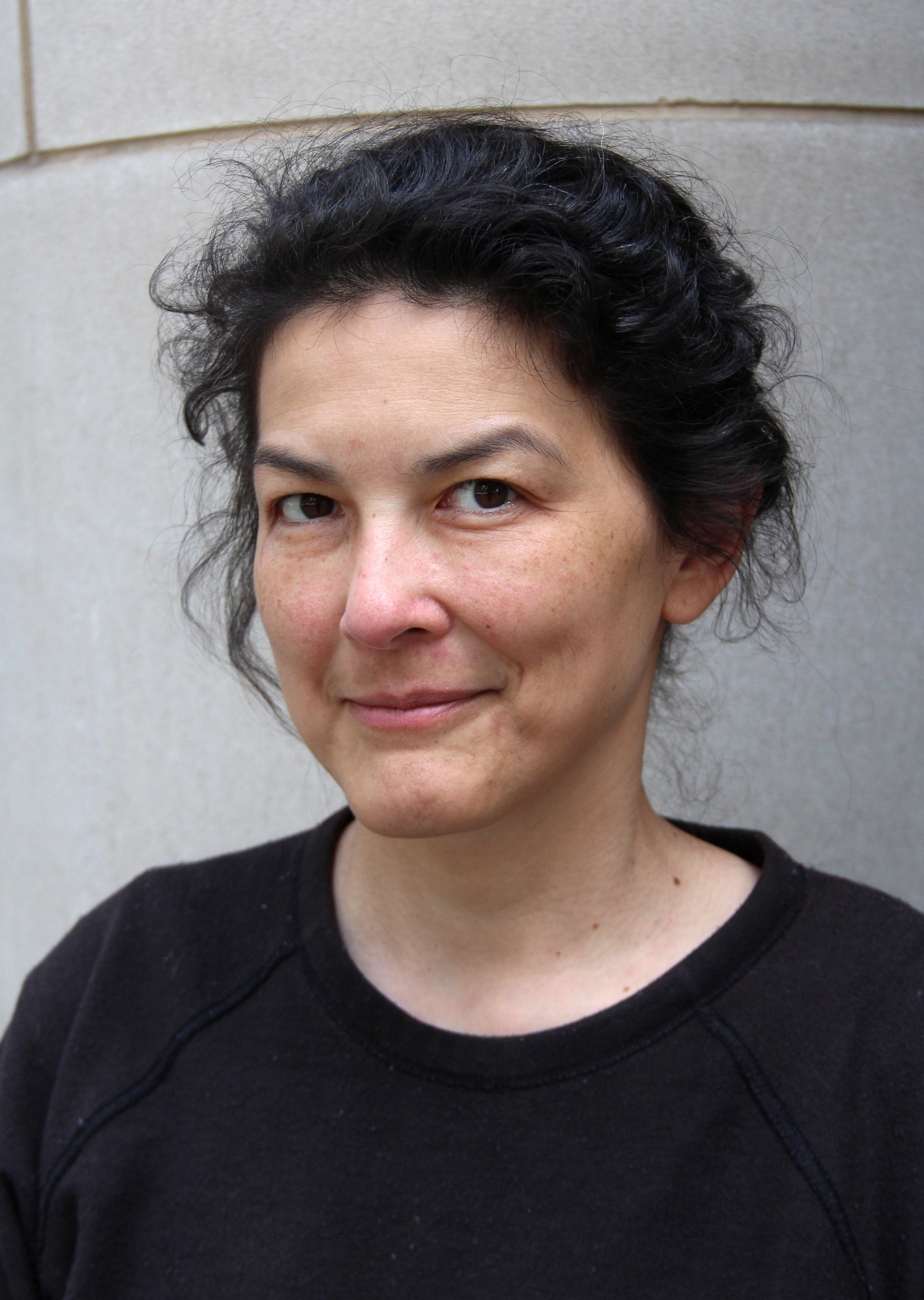
- Alma mater: University of Cincinnati
- Employer: Stockton University
- Awards: Kundiman Fellowship

Cynthia Arrieu-King is an American poet with Chinese heritage.

== Early life ==
Cynthia Arrieu-King was raised in Louisville, Kentucky.

== Career ==
Cynthia Arrieu-King is the author of four collections of poetry, People are Tiny in Paintings of China (2010); Manifest (2013); Futureless Languages (2018) and Continuity (2021). She also co-wrote a chapbook with Ariana-Sophia Kartsonis titled By a Year Lousy with Meteors (2012) and a book-length collaborative volume of poetry with the late Hillary Gravendyk, Unlikely Conditions (2016).

Arrieu-King edited the anthology-length Asian Anglophone issue of dusie.

Cynthia Arrieu-King works as a professor of creative writing at Stockton University. Through the campus radio station 91.7 WLFR, she produced the show The Last Word from 2011 to 2013, and rebooted it from 2022 to the end of 2024: Episodes can be found on Spotify.

== Awards and honors ==
Manifest won the 2013 Gatewood Prize selected by Harryette Mullen. By Some Miracle a Year Lousy with Meteors won the 2011 Dream Horse Press Chapbook Prize. Arrieu-King has also received a Kundiman Fellowship.

== Works ==
Poetry

- 2006 The Small Anything City, Dream Horse Press, chapbook
- 2010 People are Tiny in Paintings of China, Octopus Books,
- 2013 Manifest, Switchback Books
- 2018 Futureless Languages, Radiator Press
- 2021 Continuity, Octopus Books

Collaborations

- 2016 By Some Miracle a Year Lousy with Meteors with Ariana-Sophia Kartsonis, Dream Horse Press
- 2017 Unlikely Conditions with Hillary Gravendyk, 1913 Press

Poems

- 2017 "Something Beyond Interpretation," "Lobster," and "empire," in Bomb Magazine
- 2017 "Everybody Believes They are the Good Guy," in Poetry Magazine
- 2019 "Saga," American Poetry Review

Creative non-fiction

- 2021 The Betweens, Noemi Press

Short fiction

- 2015 "Boxes," in The Collagist
- 2015 "Franny," in Joyland Magazine
- "Roads Impassable," in StorySouth
