= Cynthia Reinhart-King =

American biomedical engineer and academic

Cynthia A. Reinhart-King
- Education: Massachusetts Institute of Technology; University of Pennsylvania
- Scientific career
- Workplaces: University of Rochester; Vanderbilt University; Cornell University; Rice University
- Thesis: Traction forces exerted by endothelial cells on deformable substrates (2006)

Cynthia "Cindy" Reinhart-King is an American biomedical engineer and Department Chair of Bioengineering at Rice University. Her research considers cell motility and adhesion. She serves as president of the Biomedical Engineering Society.

== Early life and education ==
Reinhart-King studied chemical engineering and biology at Massachusetts Institute of Technology. She studied integrin-mediated signaling alongside Doug Lauffenburger. Integrin-mediated signaling describes the molecular signals that are initiated when an extracellular ligand binds to an integrin on the cellular surface, resulting in the regulation of a downstream cellular process. After graduating, she joined the University of Pennsylvania as a doctoral student, where she worked on cell adhesion in the endothelium. She moved to the University of Rochester for postdoctoral research, studying atherosclerosis with Bradford Berk.

== Research and career ==
Reinhart-King's research has helped understanding of cancer progression. She has monitored disease progression at the molecular, cellular and tissue level. Her analytical strategy combines cellular imaging with mechanical measurements, histology and biochemical assays. She showed how the cellular matrix stiffens after tumor formation, promoting tumor growth and impacting the effectiveness of cancer treatments. Her lab, the Reinhart-King Laboratory, has demonstrated that although cancer cells move quickly during metastasis, their migration through the body occurs via the most easy pathways. In particular, they favor wider spaces that are easier navigated than smaller and more confined ones. The lab has also shown that metastatic cancer cells leaving tumors travel in clusters and "draft" off each other through tissue to preserve energy as they form new tumor sites.

Reinhart-King has also investigated diabetic retinopathy. This condition can cause blindness in diabetic patients. She started her independent scientific career at Cornell University.

In 2021, Reinhart-King became President Elect of the Biomedical Engineering Society. She was made Senior Associate Dean for Research at Vanderbilt University in 2022. She has been involved with science policy, serving as an expert advisor to the federal government of the United States on biotechnology and biomanufacturing. In 2024, Reinhart-King joined Rice University as the John W. Cox Professor of Bioengineering and chair of the Bioengineering department.

== Awards and honors ==
- 2010 Rita Schaffer Young Investigator Award
- 2011 NSF Faculty Early Career Award
- 2013 Cook Award for commitment to women's issues, Cornell University
- 2015 Zellman Warhaft Commitment to Diversity Award
- 2016 Elected Fellow of the American Institute for Medical and Biological Engineering
- 2017 Elected Fellow of the Biomedical Engineering Society
- 2016 National Academy of Engineering Frontiers Fellow
- 2018 Biomedical Engineering Society Mid-Career Award
- 2018 National Academies of Sciences, Engineering, and Medicine Inaugural New Voices Fellow
- 2019 Grace Hopper Distinguished Lecture
- 2022 University Distinguished Professor, Vanderbilt University
- 2023 Edward White Service Award, Vanderbilt University School of Engineering
- 2022-2024 President of the Biomedical Engineering Society

== Selected publications ==
- Matthew J Paszek; Nastaran Zahir; Kandice R Johnson; et al. (2005). "Tensional homeostasis and the malignant phenotype". Cancer Cell. 8 (3): 241–54. doi:10.1016/j.ccr.2005.08.010. PMID 16169468. Wikidata Q27860932.
- Cynthia A Reinhart-King; Micah Dembo; Daniel A Hammer (2008). "Cell-cell mechanical communication through compliant substrates". Biophysical Journal. 95 (12): 6044–6051. doi:10.1529/biophysj.107.127662. PMC 2599854. PMID 18775964. Wikidata Q37008291.
- Cynthia A Reinhart-King; Micah Dembo; Daniel A Hammer (2005). "The dynamics and mechanics of endothelial cell spreading". Biophysical Journal. 89 (1): 676–689. doi:10.1529/biophysj.104.054320. PMC 1366566. PMID 15849250. Wikidata Q34350613.

== Personal life ==
Reinhart-King is married to Michael King, the E.D. Butcher Chair of Bioengineering at Rice University.
