= Cynthia Robinson (disambiguation) =

Cynthia Robinson (1944–2015) was an American musician. Cynthia Robinson may also refer to:

- Cynthia Addai-Robinson (born 1980), American actress
- Cynthia Robinson Alexander, American academic administrator and interim president
