= Cynthia White =

New Zealand applied linguistics academic

- Born: 1956 (age 69–70)
- Education: Massey University
- Scientific career
- Workplaces: University of New England, Massey University, Victoria University of Wellington
- Thesis: Metacognitive, cognitive, social and affective strategy use in foreign language learning : a comparative study (1993)

Cynthia Joan White (born 1956) is a New Zealand applied linguistics academic.

== Academic career ==
After an undergraduate at Victoria University of Wellington, White earned her PhD entitled 'Metacognitive, cognitive, social and affective strategy use in foreign language learning: a comparative study' from Massey University, while working there. She is also an adjunct faculty member at the University of New England in Australia.

== Selected publications ==
- White, Cynthia. Language learning in distance education. Ernst Klett Sprachen, 2003.
- White, Cynthia. "Expectations and emergent beliefs of self-instructed language learners." System 27, no. 4 (1999): 443–457.
- White, Cynthia. "Autonomy and strategy use in distance foreign language learning: Research findings." System 23, no. 2 (1995): 207–221.
- White, Cynthia. "Distance learning of foreign languages." Language Teaching 39, no. 4 (2006): 247–264.
