= Cynthia Ling Lee =

American dancer and choreographer

Cynthia Ling Lee is an American dancer, choreographer, and scholar. She performs in contemporary, postmodern, and classical Indian dance techniques. Her research focuses on queer and postcolonial experiences in Asian diasporic performance.

== Biography ==
Lee was raised in Texas by immigrant parents from Taiwan. She is of Han Chinese and Indigenous Taiwanese descent. As a child she trained in classical piano and did not begin studying dance until she was in high school, when she began taking Chinese folk dance and modern dance. She attended Swarthmore College, where she majored in English and minored in dance. After graduating from Swarthmore, she was awarded the Thomas J. Watson Fellowship to study religious dance in Thailand, India, and Brazil. While studying in India, she was introduced to Kathak, a form of Indian classical dance. She began studying Kathak and researched the connection between choreography and interculturalism. Lee returned to the United States and earned a Master of Fine Arts degree in Dance at the University of California, Los Angeles. She joined UCLA's Center for Intercultural Performance's World Festival of Sacred Music as a staff member.

After graduate school, Lee joined the Post Natyam Collective, a transnational coalition of dance artists that engage in critical approaches to South Asian dance. She joined the faculty at the University of North Carolina at Greensboro as an assistant professor of dance in the College of Visual and Performing Arts' School of Dance. She later joined the faculty at the University of California, Santa Cruz as an assistant professor of theatre arts, teaching contemporary dance and Kathak. Her choreographic work and research focuses on postcolonial, queer, and feminist-of-color interventions in Asian diasporic performance. She has performed at the Dance Theater Workshop in New York, East West Players in Los Angeles, the IGNITE! Festival of Contemporary Dance in New Delhi, and Chandra-Mandapa: Spaces in Chennai.

Lee is an executive board member of the Network of Ensemble Theatres.
