= Cynthia McClain-Hill =

American lawyer

Department of Water and Power Board Member

Personal details
- Born: Cynthia McClain; November 10, 1957 (age 68) Los Angeles, California, U.S.
- Education: University of California Los Angeles (BA); University of California Los Angeles (JD)

Cynthia McClain-Hill (born Cynthia McClain; November 10, 1957) is an American lawyer, policy strategist, and co-founder of Strategic Counsel, PLC. McClain-Hill represents clients engaged in significant real estate development efforts or other land use related matters, provides counsel on a variety of public-private partnerships, and is recognized as one of California’s “Super Lawyers”.

McClain-Hill has served on multiple public and private sector boards and regulatory commissions including Los Angeles Department of Water and Power, Los Angeles Board of Police Commissioners, California Coastal Commission, the California Fair Political Practices Commission, Community Redevelopment Agency Commission, and the CalEPA Environmental Justice Advisory Working Group.

== Biography ==
McClain-Hill attended the University of California Los Angeles, graduating in 1978 with a Bachelor of Arts Political Science and completed her Juris Doctor from UCLA's School of Law three years later. She was the UCLA Student Body President and First Vice President of the Class of 1976-1977.

In 1995, McClain-Hill was working at CS First Boston when her entire Public Finance Department was laid off. Following the lay-off, McClain-Hill start her own practice, McClain-Hill & Associates, now known as Strategic Counsel, PLC. She calls this move in her life as her becoming an “accidental entrepreneur”.

“I always tell people that I was an accidental entrepreneur. I didn't set out to be in business. I set out to do a particular thing and to have a particular career.”

McClain-Hill was appointed to the City of Los Angeles Community Redevelopment Agency Commission in 1993. She has worked in the Small and Local Business Advisory Commission, the Los Angeles Mayor's Economic Advisory Council, and appointed to the California Coastal Commission by former California Governor Gray Davis in March 1999. She was also one of five co-chairs for his transition team after his election to office.

On August 3, 2016, McClain-Hill was sworn in as a member of the Los Angeles Police Commission after being nominated by Mayor Eric Garcetti McClain-Hill is one of two black commissioners, as well as its third female member.

In 2018, after concluding her time with the Los Angeles Police Commission, McClain-Hill was confirmed into the Board of Commissioners of the Los Angeles Department of Water and Power by the Los Angeles City Council on August 16, 2018. As appointed by Mayor Eric Garcetti, she will serve a four-year term and replaced former Board Vice-President William W. Funderburk, Jr.

=== Achievements and awards ===
In an annual survey of more than 65,000 of her peers, McClain-Hill was named one of Southern California’s “Super Lawyers”, from 2005 to 2007 and 2013-2015.

McClain-Hill was the 2008 - 2009 National President of the National Association of Women Business Owners (NAWBO). She was also the former president of the Los Angeles chapter of the National Association of Women Business Owners (NAWBO-LA) from 1999 to 2001. McClain-Hill is a recipient of the U.S. Small Business Administration's "Women in Business Advocate Award" from NAWBO, the first annual "Ruth Standish Baldwin Award" from the Greater Sacramento Urban League, and the "Thurgood Marshall Award" from Minorities in Business Magazine.

== Personal life ==
Cynthia McClain-Hill is married with two children.
