= Cindy Brown =

Cindy or Cynthia Brown may refer to:

- Cindy Brown (basketball) (born 1965), American basketball player
- Cindy Brown (field hockey) (born 1985), South African field hockey player
- Cindy Lynn Brown (born 1973), Danish-American poet
- Cynthia Gwyn Brown (born 1974), Playboy model
- Cynthia Brown (singer), French singer
- Cynthia Stokes Brown (1938–2017), American educator-historian
