= Cynthia Gallagher =

American artist

Cynthia Gallagher (born 1951) is an American artist. Her work is included in the collections of the Whitney Museum of American Art and the Metropolitan Museum of Art. She is an assistant professor at the Fashion Institute of Technology.
