= Cynthia Jenks =

American physical chemist

Cynthia Jeanne Jenks is an American physical chemist whose research has involved the surface properties of silver and of quasicrystals, observed through scanning tunneling microscopy and photoelectron spectroscopy. She is associate laboratory director for physical sciences at the Oak Ridge National Laboratory.

== Education and career ==
Jenks majored in chemical engineering at the University of California, Los Angeles, graduating in 1986. She went to Columbia University for graduate study in chemistry, where she earned a master's degree in 1988, and completed her doctorate in 1992.

After postdoctoral research at Iowa State University she became a permanent research staff member at the Ames National Laboratory of the United States Department of Energy, located at Iowa State University, in 1995. In 2017 she moved from Ames to the Argonne National Laboratory as director of the Chemical Sciences and Engineering Division, and in 2021 she moved again to the Oak Ridge National Laboratory as associate laboratory director for physical sciences.

== Recognition ==
In 2011, Jenks was named as a Fellow of the American Association for the Advancement of Science, for "major discoveries about surfaces of aluminum-rich quasicrystals, for sustained scientific outreach, and leadership in scientific planning within the Ames Laboratory of the U.S. Department of Energy".
