= Cynthia Hiner =

American politician

Member of the Montana House of Representatives from the 85th district
- In office January 3, 2005 – January 7, 2013
- Succeeded by: Gordon Pierson

Personal details
- Born: August 16, 1970 (age 55)
- Party: Democratic

Cynthia "Cindy" Hiner is an American politician and a former Democratic member of the Montana House of Representatives, who representing District 85.
