= Cynthia Bendlin =

Paraguayan activist

Cynthia Bendlin is a Paraguayan activist against human trafficking. As of 2008 she is the manager of the International Order for Migration's counter-trafficking information campaign in the borders of Argentina, Brazil and Paraguay. She has led seminars about how to combat human trafficking in Argentina, Brazil, and Paraguay. Bendlin and her family have faced threats due to her work against human trafficking, and she has been forced to move.

Bendlin received a 2008 International Women of Courage Award. At the award dinner, she said "This [award] is not for us; it is for all that we are fighting for".

She received the Ruby Prize from the Soroptimist International Millenium Club in 2013.
