= Cindy (given name) =

- Pronunciation: /ˈsɪndi/ SYN-dee
- Gender: Female
- Language: Greek

Origin
- Meaning: "from Cynthus" (Cynthia) or "light" (Lucinda)
- Region of origin: Greece

Other names
- Alternative spelling: Cindee; Cyndee; Syndee; Sindee; Sindi; Syndi; Syndy; Cindi; Cyndi; Cyndy; Sindy
- Related names: Cynthia; Lucinda; Lucia; Lucy

Cindy is a feminine given name. Originally diminutive (or hypocorism) of Cynthia, Lucinda or Cinderella, it is also commonly used as a name on its own right. The name can also be spelled as Cindee, Cyndee, Syndee, Sindee, Sindi, Syndi, Syndy, Cindi, Cyndi, Cyndy, and Sindy. From 1953 to 1973 it was among top 100 most common female given names.

== People ==
=== Cindy ===
- Cindy Adams (born 1930), American gossip columnist
- Cindy Amaiza, Kenyan HIV/AIDS activist
- Cindy Bass (born 1967), American politician
- Cindy Bennett, American politician
- Cindy Birdsong (born 1939), American singer
- Cindy Bishop (born 1978), Thai model, actress, beauty pageant titleholder and activist
- Cindy Blackman Santana (born 1959), American drummer
- Cindy Bortz, American figure skater, 1987 world junior champion
- Cindy Bouque (born 1975), Belgian female shooter
- Cindy Breakspeare (born 1954), Jamaican model
- Cindy Chupack, American screenwriter and film director
- Cindy Crawford (born 1966), American model
- Cindy Dandois (born 1984), Belgian mixed martial artist
- Cindy Davis (born 1977), American bicycle motocross racer
- Cindy L. Ehlers (born 1951), American neuroscientist and professor
- Cindy Estrada, American trade union leader
- Cindy Garrison (born 1972), outdoors guide
- Cindy Golding (born 1952), American politician and businesswoman
- Cindy Greiner (born 1957), American heptathlete and long jumper
- Cindy Herron (born 1961), American singer and actress
- Cindy Hyde-Smith (born 1959), American politician
- Cindy Jackson (born 1957), American aesthetic consultant, author and television personality
- Cindy James (1944–1989), Canadian formerly missing person
- Cindy Jaynes (born 1959), American rear admiral
- Cindy Jebb, United States Army brigadier general
- Cindy A. Johnson, Guyanese basketball player
- Cindy Kenny-Gilday (born 1954), Sahtu environmentalist and activist for Indigenous rights in Canada
- Cindy Kimberly (born 1998), Spanish and Dutch influencer and model
- Cindy Klassen (born 1979), Canadian speed skater
- Cindy Kleine, American film director, producer and video artist
- Cindy Kurleto, Austrian model, actress, and a former MTV VJ
- Cindy Margolis (born 1965), American glamour spokesmodel and actress
- Cindy Maxwell-Ostdiek, American politician
- Cindy May McGuire (born 1996), Indonesian beauty pageant titleholder
- Cindy McCain (born 1954), American businesswoman
- Cindy Meehl, American documentary filmmaker and director
- Cindy Miles, Canadian politician
- Cindy Milstein, American anarchist activist
- Cindy Monica Salsabila Setiawan (born 1999), Indonesian politician
- Cindy Nelson (born 1955), American alpine ski racer
- Cindy Ninos (born 1972), Greek skeleton racer
- Cindy Noble (born 1958), American basketball player
- Cindy O'Callaghan (born 1956), British actress
- Cindy Parlow Cone (born 1978), American former soccer player and head coach
- Cindy Pieters (born 1976), Belgian racing cyclist
- Cindy Pritzker (1923–2025), American philanthropist
- Cindy Robinson (born 1973), American voice actress
- Cindy Rondón (born 1988), Dominican volleyball player
- Cindy Sampson (born 1978), Canadian film and television actress
- Cindy Schall (died 1972), American murder victim
- Cindy Sheehan (born 1957), American anti-war activist
- Cindy Shelley (born 1960), British actress
- Cindy Sherman (born 1954), American photographer and film director
- Cindy Silvestre (born 1993), French kickboxer
- Cindy Valentine, Italian born Canadian singer and actress
- Cindy Vela (born 1979), American actress and model
- Cindy Walker (1918–2006), American songwriter, singer and dancer
- Cindy Whitehead (born 1962), American skateboarder
- Cindy Williams (1947–2023), American actress
- Cindy Wilson (born 1957), American singer
- Cindy Yen (born 1986), Taiwanese actress

=== Cindi ===
- Cindi Cain, Canadian country music artist
- Cindi Duchow (born 1959), American politician
- Cindi Katz (born 1954), American geographer
- Cindi Leive (born 1967), American magazine editor
- Cindi Love, American entrepreneur and businessperson

=== Cyndi ===
- Cyndi Almouzni (born 1984), French pop and dance music singer
- Cyndi Buchheit-Courtway (born 1976), American politician
- Cyndi Carrasco, American politician
- Cyndi Grecco (born 1952), American singer
- Cyndi Howerton, American politician
- Cyndi Taylor Krier (born 1950), American lawyer and politician
- Cyndi Lauper (born 1953), American singer-songwriter and actress
- Cyndi Lee, American Mindful Yoga teacher
- Cyndi Munson (born 1985), American politician
- Cyndi Stevenson (born 1960), American politician
- Cyndi Tang, American animation director
- Cyndi Thomson (born 1976), American singer-songwriter
- Cyndi Wang (born 1982), Taiwanese actress and singer
- Cyndi Shannon Weickert, American psychiatrist
- Cyndi Williams, American voice actress and script writer

=== Cyndy ===
- Cyndy Brucato (born 1951), American journalist
- Cyndy Garvey (born 1949), American television personality
- Cyndy Jacobsen (born 1960), American politician
- Cyndy Poor (born 1953), American Olympic track and field athlete
- Cyndy Szekeres (1933–2024), American children's book author and illustrator
- Cyndy Violette (born 1959), American poker player

== Fictional characters ==
- Cindy Beale, a character in the British soap opera EastEnders
- Cindy Bear in Hanna-Barbera cartoons
- Cindy Brady in TV show The Brady Bunch
- Cindy Campbell, the protagonist of the Scary Movie franchise
- Cindy Cunningham in the British soap opera Hollyoaks
- Cindy Decker in a series of mystery novels by Faye Kellerman
- Cindy Moon, aka Silk from Marvel Comics
- Cindy Snow in Three's Company
- Cindy Stone, a character who appears as a victim in the video game, Phoenix Wright: Ace Attorney
- Cindy Vortex in The Adventures of Jimmy Neutron, Boy Genius
- Cindy Lou Who in Dr. Seuss' book How the Grinch Stole Christmas!

== See also ==
- Cindy (disambiguation)
- Cindy-Lu Bailey, Australian Deaflympic swimmer
- Sindy (doll)
