= When the Bough Breaks (Kellerman novel) =

1985 novel by Jonathan Kellerman

- First edition
- Author: Jonathan Kellerman
- Language: English
- Series: Alex Delaware novels
- Release number: 1
- Genre: Mystery
- Publisher: Random House
- Publication date: March 1985
- Publication place: United States
- Media type: Print (Hardcover)
- Pages: 432
- ISBN: 0-345-46660-8
- OCLC: 53397597
- Followed by: Blood Test

When the Bough Breaks is a mystery novel by Jonathan Kellerman. It is the first novel in the Alex Delaware series.

== Plot ==
Alex Delaware, a retired child psychologist, finds his quiet morning interrupted by Detective Milo Sturgis. Milo brings disturbing news: psychiatrist Morton Handler and Elena Gutierrez have been brutally murdered. Milo seeks Alex's expertise to help a young child witness, Melody Quinn, who might have observed the assailants. Despite his initial reluctance, Alex agrees to assist, drawn by the circumstances and the opportunity to help a child. Milo shares a gruesome account of the murder scene, hoping to gain Alex's full assistance in interviewing Melody. The child lives in the same building as the deceased and might have seen something important. Alex's acceptance confirms Milo's trust in his abilities and signals a desire for Alex's deeper participation in the investigation.

Alex visits Melody and her mother, Bonita Quinn, in their cramped apartment. He learns about Melody's hyperactivity and the medication she takes, which could affect her memory. Despite these obstacles, Alex persists with Melody, gently using his professional methods to explore her memories. The session yielded little, but Alex is determined to help the child, sensing her vulnerability and the gravity of the case. He knows that unlocking her suppressed observations is paramount to solving the homicides.

As Alex delves into Handler's patient files, he finds a pattern of unethical behavior and possible motives connected to the murder. Handler's notes show a disdain for his patients and a questionable partnership with a former patient, Maurice Bruno, who is also found deceased. The investigation exposes a pattern of deception and manipulation, with Handler at its center, compelling Alex to piece together the genuine story behind the killings. This exploration into Handler's past reveals a disturbing professional life.

Alex's investigation leads him to La Casa de los Niños, a children's home with ties to the victims. He notes discrepancies in the staff's credentials and observes suspicious behavior, raising questions about the institution's part in the murders. As Alex pulls the relationships and hidden truths within the home, he realizes the situation is more intricate than it first appeared, with each discovery pulling him deeper into the disturbing and stare. The facility's apparent beneficence begins to fray under scrutiny.

Alex continues his deep dive into the disturbing facts surrounding the murders of Morton Handler and Elena Gutierrez. He finds a direct connection to a sinister group known as the Gentleman's Brigade, a cover for child abusers. The investigation leads him to the Hickle estate, where he encounters Kim Hickle, the widow of Stuart Hickle, who speaks of her husband's involvement in the Brigade. She insists she was unaware of his activities, having lived in isolation to escape the shame and danger. Alex learns that the Brigade's reach extends far, with prominent men engaged in the abuse of children.

Alex's investigation shows that the Brigade's activities were not limited to Los Angeles but had roots in Mexico, where Augustus McCaffrey, the head of La Casa de los Niños, previously operated. The Brigade's members include individuals such as Dr. Lionel Willard Towle and Judge Edwin Hayden. Alex understands that the murders were calculated to silence those who threatened to expose the Brigade's illicit operations. The concerns are raised when Alex learns that Melody Quinn, a child witness, is in grave danger, having been abducted by the Brigade to prevent her from speaking about what she knows.

Alex pieces together the affiliations between the Brigade members and the murders. He confronts Tim Kruger, a member in the Brigade, who describes the extent of the group's abhorrent activities and the pressures of their clandestine work. Kruger admits to his part in the abductions and homicides, driven by fear and manipulation by McCaffrey. Alex learns that Melody is being held at La Casa de los Niños, and he must act quickly to save her. The revelation of the Brigade's activities threatens to bring down many powerful men, but Alex is determined to see justice served for the victims.

Alex, with the reluctant help of Dr. Towle, infiltrates La Casa de los Niños to rescue Melody. They find her drugged and restrained, a victim of the Brigade's cruelty. As they attempt to escape, they are confronted by McCaffrey, who plans to frame Alex for Melody's death. A tense confrontation follows, with Alex using his intellect to persuade Towle to turn against McCaffrey. In a moment of clarity, Towle remembers the truth about his past and his son's fate, leading to a violent struggle that ends with McCaffrey's death. Melody is saved, but the path to her safety was arduous.

The dismantling of the Gentleman's Brigade commences. Alex's efforts expose the depravity and schemes at the heart of the organization, leading to the arrest of its members. Dr. Towle, burdened by guilt and the stark truth of his son's unfortunate end, faces the truth of his past choices. Alex reflects on the positive impact of the case, the lives saved, and the measure of justice served through his dedicated work. The wider implications of the organization's downfall are felt throughout the community.

Melody is placed in a safe and loving placement, offering hope for her future recovery and well-being. Alex's journey through the darkness of human depravity reaffirms his unwavering commitment to protecting the innocent and vulnerable. The experience, while harrowing, solidifies his resolve to use his unique abilities to aid those who cannot help themselves, ensuring that such horrific acts are brought to light and their perpetrators held accountable. The story ends with a sense of closure and the promise of healing for Melody.

== Awards ==
- 1986 Anthony award, Best First novel
- 1986 Edgar Award, Best First novel by An American Author

== Adaptations ==
The novel was adapted for a 1986 television film, also titled When the Bough Breaks, co-produced by and starring Ted Danson as Alex Delaware and Richard Masur as Milo Sturgis.
