= Milk and Honey =

Milk and Honey may refer to:

== Music ==
- The Milk and Honey Band, an English band
- Milk and Honey (album), a 1984 album by John Lennon and Yoko Ono
- Milk & Honey (Crowder album), 2021
- Milk & Honey (German group), German musical duo consisting of Anne Ross and Manel Filali
- Milk and Honey (Israeli group), Israeli band that won the Eurovision Song Contest 1979
- "Milk and Honey", a song by Jackson C. Frank from the 1965 album Jackson C. Frank
- "Milk & Honey", a song by Beck from the 1999 album Midnite Vultures
- "Milkshake 'n Honey", a song by Sleater-Kinney from the 2000 album All Hands on the Bad One
- "Milk & Honey", a song by As Tall as Lions from the 2006 album As Tall as Lions
- "Milk & Honey", a song by Clinic from the 2010 album Bubblegum
- "Milk and Honey", a song by Delain from the 2012 album We Are the Others
- "Milk & Honey", a song by Arcade Fire created for the score to the 2013 film Her
- "Milk n' Honey", a song by Anderson .Paak featuring Tray Samuels from the 2014 album Venice
- "Milk & Honey", a song by Billie Marten from the 2016 album Writing of Blues and Yellows
- "Milk and Honey", by Hollie Cook, from the compilation album Saint-Germain-des-Prés Café: The Must-Have Cool Tempo Selection by Bart & Baker

== Other uses ==
- Milk & Honey (bar), a members' cocktail bar in London and New York
- Milk and Honey (film), a Canadian film released in 1988
- Milk and Honey (musical), a 1961 Broadway musical by Jerry Herman and Don Appell
- Milk and Honey (Kellerman novel), a novel by Faye Kellerman
- Milk and Honey (Jolley novel), a novel by Elizabeth Jolley
- The Milk & Honey Distillery, a Single-Malt Whisky distillery located in Israel
- Milk and Honey (poetry collection), a 2015 collection by the Canadian poet Rupi Kaur
- The Biblical description of the Promised Land of Canaan as "a land flowing with milk and honey"
- Land of milk and honey, an imaginary or real land of abundance (particularly, the Land of Israel)

== See also ==
- Land of Milk and Honey, a 1971 documentary film by Pierre Étaix
- Scaphism, an execution method which includes the victim being fed milk and honey
- Switzerland has also been known colloquially as the "land of milk and honey"
