= Monster (Kellerman novel) =

1999 novel by Jonathan Kellerman

- First edition
- Author: Jonathan Kellerman
- Language: English
- Series: Alex Delaware novels
- Genre: Mystery
- Publisher: Random House
- Publication date: 1999
- Publication place: United States
- Media type: Print (Hardcover), ebook, Unabridged Cassette
- Pages: 416 pp
- ISBN: 978-0-345-41387-1
- OCLC: 45253917
- Followed by: Dr. Death

Monster is a psychological thriller and murder mystery novel by Jonathan Kellerman. It is the 14th novel in the Alex Delaware series.

== Plot ==
The mutilated body of an aspiring actor is found in the trunk of a car parked near an industrial area. Weeks later, another body appears in similar condition at another location. This time, the body is a female psychologist, who was working in a state facility for psychotic criminals. One similarity of the mutilations is obvious. The eyes were targeted. The case goes to LAPD detective Milo Sturgis, assisted by Dr. Alex Delaware, an old friend and psychological consultant.

The two find out that similar eye mutilations were infamously performed in the case of a family mass murder some years ago, and the culprit is now in the same facility where the female doctor worked. The media had described him simply as a "monster" following his arrest. Facing him, Milo and Alex find the "monster" in a deteriorated condition locked within a highly secured cell. To add to the drama, the detectives get a tip-off that the killer, who hardly speaks, had said something that implied knowledge of the doctor's mutilated eyes.

== Release and sales ==
Monster was first published in hardback in the United States in 1999 through Random House, accompanied by an audiobook adaptation narrated by John Rubinstein. A paperback edition was released the following year.

=== Sales ===
Sales for the hardback and paperback editions were favorable enough to place it on the New York Times Best Seller list for the weeks of December 26, 1999 and October 1, 2000, respectively.

== Reception ==
Critical reception for the book was mixed. Michael Harris reviewed Monster for the Los Angeles Times, criticizing Kellerman's handling of politics, stating that it wasn't the author's strong point and that the book's villain did not seem clever enough. Dale Jones of The Gazette was more favorable, as they viewed it as one of Kellerman's best works.
