= Jim Swan =

Scottish Chemist focused on Whisky (1941–2017)

James Sneddon Swan
- Born: December 25, 1941; East Lothian, Scotland
- Died: February 14, 2017 (aged 75)
- Education: Heriot-Watt University
- Occupations: Biologist; Chemist; Whisky Consultant
- Known for: Pioneer of the "Whisky flavor wheel"; Research on Whisky production in hot climates

James Sneddon Swan (born December 25, 1941) was a Scottish chemist, biologist, and author, known for his expertise in single malt whisky.

Referred to as the "Einstein of Whisky", his research into whisky and its distillation process pioneered new methods of production. Swan demonstrated that it was possible to create good whisky despite being aged a short amount of time, leading him to work alongside new whisky distilleries throughout the world as a consultant and expert.

Following his scientific and technical contributions to the industry, the "Dr Jim Swan Award For Services To Scotch Whisky" award was posthumously named after him.

== Education and professional life ==
In 1965 Swan received a bachelor's degree in applied chemistry from Heriot-Watt University in Edinburgh. In 1988, he graduated from the same university with a PhD in chemistry and biological sciences. His PhD focused on the subject of wood extractives in relation to the maturation of scotch whisky.

As a member of the Royal Society of Chemistry, he was an expert on gas chromatography. He was a founding member of the scientific team at Jim Gray and Eric Dewar at Inveresk Research International, since 1974 the Pentlands Scotch Whisky Research Ltd and Scotch Whisky Research Institute (SWRI). In the SWRI, Swan managed research programmes, funded by the European Union and the United Kingdom. In 1979, research by Swan and co-researcher Sheila Burtles led to the creation and publication of the first whisky flavour wheel. The flavour wheel serves as an industry standard for sensory evaluation of whisky.

He was also a member of the Institute of Brewing and Distilling.

Swan researched how hot climates affected the whisky fermenting, distillation, and aging process, and how to work around factors affected by warm climates, such as alcohol oxidation or angel's share.

In 2002 he founded the Dr James Swan food and drink consultancy. Prior to this, he was a partner in the Tatlock & Thompson consultancy.

Due to his understanding and impact on the whisky industry, he has been called monikers such as the Einstein of whisky, The Single Malt Whisperer or the ultimate whisky troubleshooter.

== Activities ==
Swan worked as a consultant, blender and master distiller for distilleries around the world and played a role in the design of their distillation process. He contributed to the distilleries:

- Amrut Distillery, Bangalore
- Annandale distillery, Annan
- Clydeside distillery, Glasgow
- Cotswold Distillery, Stourton
- Dublin Whiskey Distillery, Dublin
- Kavalan Distillery, Yi-Lan
- Kilchoman distillery, Isle of Islay
- Lindores Abbey Distillery, Newburgh
- Milk & Honey Distillery, Tel Aviv-Yafo
- Nc'nean distillery, Morvern (Drimin Estate)
- Penderyn distillery, Rhondda Cynon Taf
- The London Distillery, London
- Spirit of Yorkshire Distillery, Filey Bay
- St George's Distillery, Roudham
- Macaloney's Island Distillery, Saanich
- Virginia Distillery Company, Virginia

== STR Casks ==
Jim Swan is credited with the invention of the STR cask rejuvenation process. Shaved, toasted and re-charred (STR) indicates that the cask has undergone rejuvenation by having its staves shaved down and then recharred. The distilleries which Jim are associated with are all notable for the use of STR Casks.

== Published academic papers ==
- James S. Swan et al. .: Sensory and instrumental studies of scotch whisky flavor. In: The Quality of Foods and Beverages. Academic Press, 1981, ISBN 0-12-816681-9 , pp. 201–223.
- D. Howie, JS Swan: Compounds influencing peatiness in scotch paints whisky flavor. In: Lalli Nykänen, Pekka Lehtonen (Ed.): Flavor Research of Alcoholic Beverages. 1984, ISBN 951-95852-2-2, pp. 279–290.
- James S. Swan: Maturation of Potable Spirits. In: G. Charalambous (Ed.): Handbook of Food and Beverage Stability. Academic Press, 1986, ISBN 0-12-169070-9 , pp. 801–833.
- James Sneddon Swan: Wood extractives in relation to the maturation of scotch whisky. PhD thesis. Heriot-Watt University, 1988, OCLC 499922686 .
- JS Swan et al. .: A study of the effects of air and kiln drying of cooperage oakwood. In: Élaboration et connaissance des spiritueux. 1993, ISBN 2-87777-357-4 , pp. 557–561.

== Awards ==
Awards attributed personally to Swan include:

1993 – Institute of Brewing & Distilling's Fellowship

2005 – Whisky Advocate's "Pioneer of The Year" Award

2017 – Scottish Whisky Awards' "The Dr. Jim Swan Award for Services to Scotch Whisky (awarded post-mortem, with the award named after him).

Distilleries he contributed to have won World Whisky of the Year awards, Artisian Whisky of the Year awards, Islay Whisky of the Year award, and Microdistillery Whisky of the Year award.

== Personal life ==
Swan's family consisted of his wife Thelma, and his daughters, Caroline and Victoria.
