= Brucato =

Brucato is an Italian surname. It is relatively uncommon in modern Italy, having been identified among only 133 citizens and ranking as the 27,322nd most common surname in the nation. It is equally scarce in the United States, appearing 825 times in the 2000 Census and ranking #27,496.

In modern Italian, brucato is the past participle of the verb brucare, which means "to graze" or "to nibble." It is more likely, however, that the surname stems from the Sicilian dialectic word "bbruca," which means "tamarisk," such that "Brucato" would refer to a place rich in this plant, which is also known as salt cedar.

Notable people with the name include:

- Cyndy Brucato (born 1951), American journalist
- Jean-Pierre Brucato (1944–1998), French football player and trainer
- Phil Brucato, American writer, journalist, editor, and game designer
- Robert Anthony Brucato (1931–2018), American prelate and bishop
- Rosario Brucato (born 1983), Italian filmmaker
