= When the Bough Breaks (1986 film) =

- Genre: Thriller
- Based on: When the Bough Breaks by Jonathan Kellerman
- Written by: Phil Penningroth
- Directed by: Waris Hussein
- Starring: Ted Danson; Richard Masur; Rachel Ticotin
- Music by: Paul Chihara
- Country of origin: United States
- Original language: English

Production
- Executive producers: Ted Danson; Dan Fauci
- Producer: Rick Husky
- Cinematography: James Crabe
- Editor: Michael Jablow
- Running time: 100 min.
- Production companies: TDF Productions; Taft Entertainment Television

Original release
- Network: NBC
- Release: October 12, 1986

When the Bough Breaks is a 1986 television film directed by Waris Hussein and starring Ted Danson. The screenplay by Phil Penningroth was adapted from Jonathan Kellerman's 1985 novel of the same name. Danson, who also co-produced, plays the crime-solving forensic psychologist Alex Delaware, a character who appears in a series of novels by Kellerman.

== Plot ==
In the opening scenes, which provide background, Alex Delaware, a prominent Los Angeles child psychologist, had testified for the prosecution in the arraignment of an accused child molester, whose victims he had been treating. To the distress of families of the victims, the defendant was released on bail. Soon after, arriving at his office, Alex had found the defendant dead, apparently by suicide. Shaken, and burned out in his profession, the doctor had moved to the mountains outside of L.A., taking an early retirement. Months later, as our story begins, a police detective friend, Milo Sturgis, comes to Alex for help in a criminal investigation. A man and a woman have been murdered in an apartment complex. A little girl named Melody Quinn, who lives in an apartment nearby with her mother, may have witnessed the killings, but is so disturbed by the event that she can't remember much. Milo asks Alex to question her, hoping he can get information without further traumatizing the child. He agrees. The story proceeds with Alex Delaware becoming increasingly drawn into investigating, and gradually uncovering, unsuspected major criminal activity, involving many perpetrators and victims.

== Cast ==
- Ted Danson as Alex Delaware
- Richard Masur as Milo Sturgis
- Rachel Ticotin as Raquel Santos
- James Noble as Dr. Warren Towle
- Kim Miyori as Kim Hickle
- Merritt Butrick as Tim Kruger
- David Huddleston as Vicar McCaffey
- Charles Lane as Van der Graaf
- Scott Paulin as Rick
- Deborah Harmon as Lisa

== Reception ==
A 1986 New York Times review said that, after a "properly taut start", "the solution to the mystery becomes apparent early on and that leaves the movie...tumbling rapidly into ever more unbelievable situations". Jeff Jarvis of People magazine called When the Bough Breaks "a nice, tight, tense little murder mystery" with "some neatly shocking scenes".
