= Jesse Kellerman =

American novelist and playwright

- Born: September 1, 1978 (age 47)
- Education: Harvard University; Brandeis University
- Occupations: Novelist; playwright
- Spouse: Gabriella Sarah (Rosen)
- Children: 3
- Parent(s): Jonathan Kellerman; Faye Kellerman
- Website: jessekellerman.com

Jesse Oren Kellerman (born September 1, 1978) is an American novelist and playwright. He is the author of the novels Sunstroke (2006), Trouble (2007), The Genius (2008), The Executor (2010), and Potboiler (2012). He has co-authored numerous books with his father Jonathan Kellerman including The Golem of Hollywood (2014).

== Life and career ==
Kellerman was born in Los Angeles, the oldest child and only son of the bestselling mystery novelists Faye Kellerman and Jonathan Kellerman. His first published title co-authored with his father was their 1994 book of children's poetry, Daddy, Daddy, Can You Touch the Sky?

Jesse Kellerman studied psychology at Harvard in Cambridge, Massachusetts and playwriting at Brandeis University in Waltham, Massachusetts. For a time he served as lead guitarist for the indie rock band Don't Shoot the Dog, based in Los Angeles.

His 2004 play Things Beyond Our Control was honored with a Princess Grace Award, which recognizes emerging talent in theater, dance, and film in the U.S. Kellerman is a recipient of the Grand Prix des Lectrices de Elle. His essay "Let My People Go to the Buffet" was chosen for Penguin's annual anthology The Best American Spiritual Writing in 2011. His 2012 book Potboiler was nominated for the Edgar Award for Best Novel in 2012.

Kellerman is an Orthodox Jew, as are his parents. He lives in Berkeley, California, with his wife, Gabriella Sarah (Rosen) and their three children.

== Bibliography ==
=== Stand-alone novels ===
- Sunstroke (2006)
- Trouble (2007)
- The Genius (2008) (published in the UK as The Brutal Art)
- The Executor (2010)
- Potboiler (2012) (published in the UK as I'll Catch You)

=== The Golem series ===
1. The Golem of Hollywood (2014) (with Jonathan Kellerman)
2. The Golem of Paris (8 November 2015) (with Jonathan Kellerman)

=== Clay Edison series ===
1. Crime Scene (2017) (with Jonathan Kellerman)
2. A Measure of Darkness (July 31, 2018) (with Jonathan Kellerman)
3. Half Moon Bay (aka Lost Souls) (July 2020) (with Jonathan Kellerman)
4. The Burning (September 2021) (with Jonathan Kellerman)
5. The Lost Coast (2024) (with Jonathan Kellerman)
6. Coyote Hills (2025) (with Jonathan Kellerman)

=== Plays ===
- Things Beyond Our Control (2004)
- 3m1w (or, Very, Very Small Things)
