= Sacred and Profane (novel) =

1987 novel by Faye Kellerman

- Author: Faye Kellerman
- Language: English
- Series: Decker/Lazarus novels
- Genre: Mystery
- Publication date: 23 October 1987
- Publication place: United States
- Media type: Print (hardback & paperback); Audiobook; E-book
- Preceded by: The Ritual Bath
- Followed by: Milk and Honey

Sacred and Profane is a 1987 novel by Faye Kellerman. It is second in the Peter Decker/Rina Lazarus series, a Fawcett Crest book published by Ballantine Books.

Timeline: About six months after The Ritual Bath, it starts Christmas Eve, when Decker is 39, in Los Angeles at Yeshiva Ohavei Torah, Foothill Division, and the LAPD.

== Plot summary ==
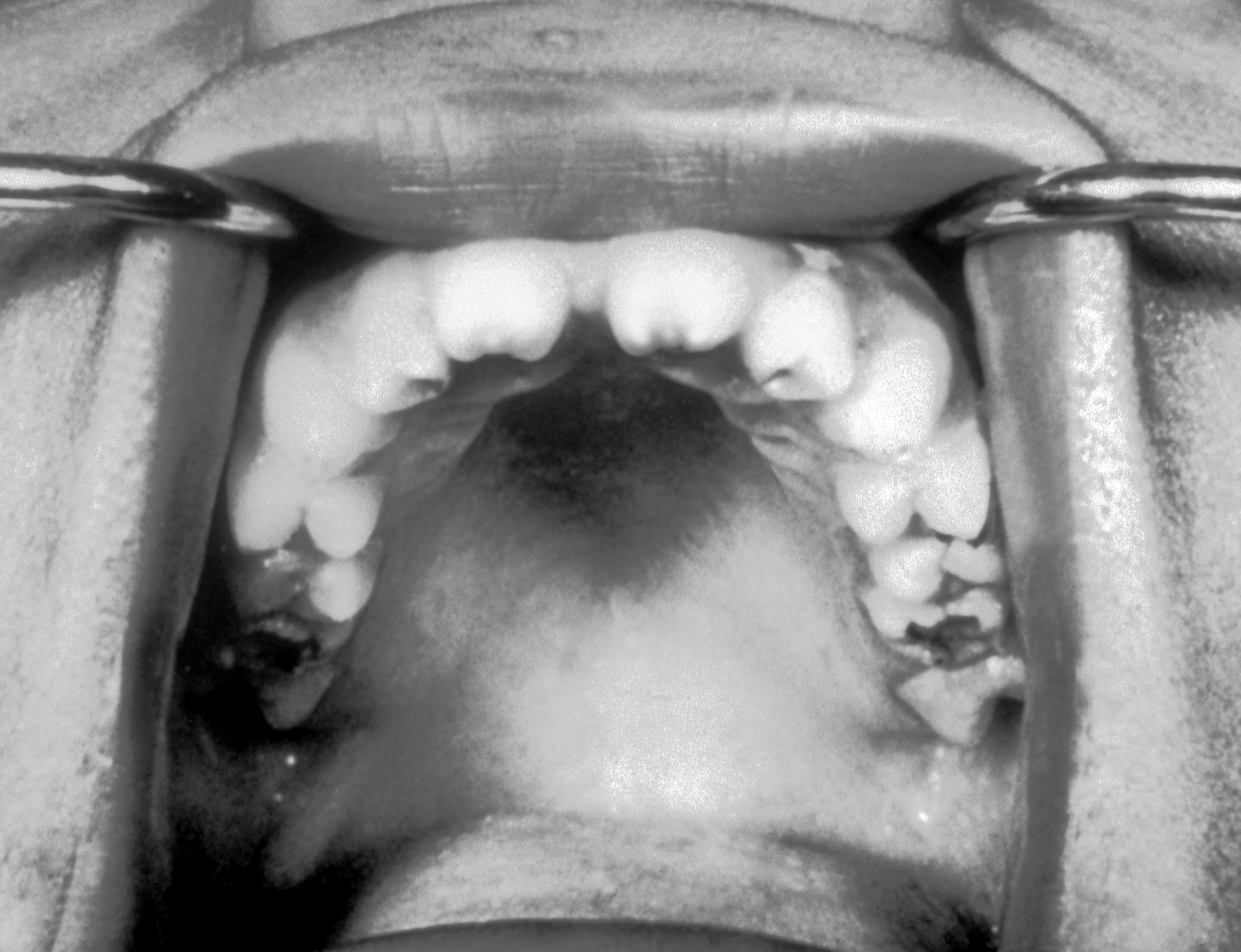
The kind of notched incisors known as Hutchinson's teeth are characteristic of congenital syphilis: One of the skeletons found in the hills having such teeth provides Peter Decker with a vital clue helping unravel the mystery in Sacred and Profane.

Having in the previous book met and fallen in love with the deeply religious Jewish Orthodox widow Rina Lazarus, LAPD Detective Sergeant Peter Decker takes Rina's boys on a camping vacation - cut short when Sammy wandered off and found two burned and buried skeletons. Peter finds himself assigned to the case, in spite of his status in the Sex and Juvenile (juvie) division, due to an unexpected lack of departmental manpower. When starting the case, he is introduced to forensic dentist Annie Hennon, who helps identify the victims as two young women, who - though having been both killed by the same gun and both their bodies burned - were of very dissimilar social backgrounds, with one's teeth having been well cared for, and the other one having had only very rudimentary dental care and having suffered from congenital syphilis. Decker embarks on the long process of tracking down who were the two young women, where they might have been, and with whom they may have been involved - following slender clues and descending into the most seamy dives behind Hollywood's glittering façade. As it turns out, one of the victims was Lindsey Bates - a happy, middle-class teenager, who was abducted and horribly tortured, mutilated, killed, and burned, with the whole process taken down on a "snuff film" made to the specifications of a depraved group of very wealthy men. The other body was that of Kate Armbuster, known as "Countess Dracula", a young prostitute who took to sadism and Satanism, played an active role in torturing and killing Bates, and was then killed herself by an accomplice; the two bodies were burned and dumped together in the hills. The search also leads Decker to photographer Cecil Pode and his sons, Dustin and Earl Pode (Dustin being in business with Earl's friend, Cameron Smithson, and his father, Harrison Smithson). Earl Pode ("Blade") is found dead in the same grave as the girls, and Decker finds that Pode's best friend Cameron is the main culprit - an utterly ruthless and unscrupulous killer, the others having been his helpers and accomplices in the production and distribution of the snuff films. The case takes a toll on Decker's Talmud studies with Rav Schulman at the yeshiva. Seeing the film depicting the systematic torture and mutilation of the innocent girl causes Decker a crisis of faith, making him for a time reject Rav Shulman's God, who allows such evil in His world. Decker's bitterness is increased by his failure to save Kiki, a spirited teenaged prostitute, who is the same age as Decker's daughter Cindy, and looks like her - and who comes to a predictable sad end despite all Decker's efforts to save and redeem her. Decker's spiritual crisis also strains his relationship with his beloved Rina. Because of the stress of their maybe/maybe not marital path, at the end of the book, Rina moves to New York City with her former in-laws, but before her departure, she spends a night of intensive lovemaking with Peter, her intense love for him having led her to violate her own deeply held objection to sex outside marriage. Then, they separate so they can both concentrate on preparing themselves for the future - she to take a job in a relative's company to stop feeling like a charity case, he to continue his Talmudic studies and decide if he really can lead a Jewish religious life for himself and not just for the purpose of being able to marry her. Decker's success in solving the Bates case and finding evidence implicating the "client" who ordered the snuff film - a powerful and utterly corrupt and depraved steel magnate - gives Decker a sense of closure, and he can once again get involved in sincere prayer.
