= Rina Lazarus =

Fictional character in mystery novels by Faye Kellerman

- First appearance: The Ritual Bath
- Created by: Faye Kellerman

In-universe information
- Gender: Female
- Occupation: Private detective
- Family: Peter Decker (second husband); Jacob Lazarus (son by first marriage); Samuel Lazarus (son by first marriage); Cindy Decker (step-daughter); Hannah Decker (daughter by second marriage)

Rina Lazarus is a fictional character in a series of mystery novels by Faye Kellerman.

== Overview ==
Rina, an Orthodox Jew, is the daughter of Holocaust survivors from Hungary. She married a yeshiva scholar when she was 17, lived in Israel with him for a time, and had two sons. During the First Lebanon War, she helped care for wounded Israeli soldiers, gaining a medical skill useful in her later American life. At that time, she resided in the Israeli settlement of Kiryat Arba in the West Bank, and as she clearly expresses in A Stone Kiss, retained a positive attitude towards the Israeli settlers. Her husband died of a brain tumour, and she went to a US college to finish her degree in mathematics. She is living and teaching at a yeshiva, a Jewish school, when she meets her second husband, Los Angeles Police Sergeant (later Lieutenant) Peter Decker, in The Ritual Bath. Decker, though raised a Baptist by his adoptive parents in Florida, discovered as an adult that his birth parents were Jewish, which makes him officially Jewish, as well. After meeting Rina during his investigation of a rape at the yeshiva, he is compelled to explore the religion for himself, and eventually to become a religiously observant Orthodox Jew.

Religion is a central part of Rina's identity. Though loving Peter, she would never have married him had he not been ready to become a Jew, not only by the accident of birth, but also by a conscious decision to become a practicing Orthodox Jew with all that involves. Rina strictly keeps the dress code and behavior appropriate to a frum, or Orthodox, Jewish woman, but with some exceptions.

In Prayers For the Dead, at one moment of her life, Rina had been deeply involved with Bram Sparks, a Roman Catholic priest, as deeply committed to Catholic Christianity as Rina was to Orthodox Judaism. Though probably not physically consummated (that point is left a bit ambiguous), the two of them deeply loved each other, though such a love was clearly contradictory to the behavior dictated by both their religions. Moreover, she retains some of her feelings for Bram even when already married to Peter, which makes Peter very jealous.

All of the books that follow in the series are rooted in Jewish themes. Major characters in the series include Rina's two sons, Jacob and Samuel Lazarus; Cindy Decker, Peter's daughter from his first marriage; Rina and Peter's daughter Hannah Decker; and Peter's partner Marge Dunn. Cindy Decker, a teenager in the earliest books, eventually follows her father into the police force, and is the main character of two of the later books, Stalker and Street Dreams.

== Novels in the series ==
- The Ritual Bath (1986)
- Sacred and Profane (1987)
- Milk and Honey (1990)
- Day of Atonement (1991)
- False Prophet (1992)
- Grievous Sin (1993)
- Sanctuary (1994)
- Justice (1995)
- Prayers for the Dead (1996)
- Serpent's Tooth (1997)
- Jupiter's Bones (1999)
- Stalker (2000)
- The Forgotten (2001)
- Stone Kiss (2002)
- Street Dreams (2003)
- The burnt house (2007)
- The Mercedes Coffin (2008)
- Blindman's Bluff (2009)
- Hangman (2010)
- Gun Games (2011)
- The Beast (2013)
- Murder 101 (2014)
- Theory of Death (2015)
- Bone Box (2017)

== Critical reception ==
Analyst Dorothea Fischer-Hornung states that the character of Rina was used to teach the reader about Orthodox Judaism, even while she "breaks the rules set out for her as an Orthodox Jewish wife", serving "to counterbalance the stereotypical view of traditional Jewish women's roles". Laurence Roth adds that Rina's relationship with the "assimilated American Jewish male", Decker, presents a "solution" to "the bane of American Jewish life during the 1990s". Roth also suggests that Rina's surname, Lazarus, "signifies the contemporary perception that Jewish tradition is being resurrected".
