= Blood Test (novel) =

1986 novel by Jonathan Kellerman

- First edition (publ. Atheneum Press)
- Author: Jonathan Kellerman
- Publisher: Atheneum Press
- Publication date: March 1, 1986
- ISBN: 978-0-689-11634-6

Blood Test, published in 1986, is the second novel by American writer Jonathan Kellerman. It is told from the first-person point of view of Dr. Alex Delaware, a child psychologist who is Kellerman's main character in the majority of his novels. The novel also includes Delaware's best friend, LAPD Detective, Milo Sturgis.

== Plot ==
The novel's primary plot centers on a 5-year-old boy, Woody Swope, who is gravely ill, whose parents have refused to allow the one treatment that could save his life. Delaware is asked by Dr. Raoul Melendez-Lynch to discuss the treatment with Woody's parents. Mr. and Mrs. Swope are convinced that non-chemical holistic medicine is the only way to treat their son. After Woody disappears from his bed in the hospital, Delaware and Milo discover that the motel room where Mr. and Mrs. Swope were staying has been abandoned; the only evidence of their occupation is a large blood stain on the floor. Their search for the family leads Delaware and Milo to a strange part of the Swopes' hometown, where morality is non-existent, and everything is permissible—even at the price of a young boy's life.

A secondary plot of the novel involves Dr. Delaware's involvement in child custody cases as a consultant to family court.
