= Cindy =

Cindy may refer to:

== People ==
- Cindy (given name), a list of people named Cindy, Cindi, Cyndi or Cyndy
- Tugiyati Cindy (born 1985), Indonesian footballer
- Cindy (singer) (1958–2001), Japanese singer

== Music ==
- Cindy (musical), an off-Broadway production in 1964 and 1965
- "Cindy" (folk song), American folk song (also known as "Cindy, Cindy")
- "Cindy, Oh Cindy", 1956 adaptation of the folk song "Pay Me My Money Down"
- "Cindy", song by C. Jérôme M. Mesure, J. Albertini, F. Richard; #6 in France 1976
- "Cindy", 1976 song by Peter, Sue and Marc
- "Cindy", 2000 song by American rock band Tammany Hall NYC
- "Cindy", a song by Bruce Springsteen from his 2015 album The Ties That Bind: The River Collection

== Other ==
- Cindy (film), 1978 TV movie adaptation of the Cinderella story
- Hurricane Cindy (disambiguation)

== See also ==
- CINDI (Coupled Ion-Neutral Dynamics Investigation), a NASA mission
- Heciyê Cindî (1908-1990), Kurdish writer, linguist and researcher
- Sindy, a British doll
