= Cindy Decker =

Fictional character

Cindy Decker (later known as Cindy Decker Kutiel) is a fictional character in a series of mystery novels by Faye Kellerman. She is the daughter of the protagonist, Peter Decker. Cindy and her mother Jan are portrayed as Jewish, but not as religiously observant as the protagonist's second wife Rina Lazarus.

== Appearances ==
- The Ritual Bath (1986)
- Sacred and Profane (1987)
- Milk and Honey (1990)
- Day of Atonement (1991)
- False Prophet (1992)
- Grievous Sin (1993)
- Sanctuary (1994)
- Justice (1995)
- Prayers for the Dead (1996)
- Serpent's Tooth (1997)
- Jupiter's Bones (1999)
- Stalker (2000)
- The Forgotten (2001)
- Stone Kiss (2002)
- Street Dreams (2004)
- The Burnt House (2007)
- The Mercedes Coffin (2008)
- Blind Man’s Bluff (2009)
- Hangman (2010)
- Gun Games (2011)
- The Beast (2013)
- Walking Shadows (2018) - phone call only
- The Hunt (2022)

== Character summary ==
In the earliest books this character is a teenager, but takes on a more active role in solving crimes in later novels and eventually follows her father into the police force.

The novel Grievous Sin sees the character of Cindy caring for her infant half-sister Hannah Decker after her stepmother has a difficult childbirth. The plot also involves her investigating the disappearance of another infant from that hospital ward.

In the novel Stalker Cindy is portrayed as a highly motivated, university-educated police rookie who comes into an explosive conflict with very corrupt fellow police officers.
