= Peter Decker =

- First appearance: The Ritual Bath
- Created by: Faye Kellerman

In-universe information
- Nicknames: Loo, Rabbi, Old Man
- Gender: Male
- Occupation: LAPD Lieutenant
- Spouses: Jan Decker (first wife); Rina Lazarus (second wife); Cindy Decker (daughter by first marriage); Jacob Lazarus (step-son); Samuel Lazarus (step-son); Hannah Decker (daughter by second marriage)
- Nationality: American

Peter Decker is a fictional character in a series of mystery novels by Faye Kellerman. A lieutenant in the Los Angeles Police Department (LAPD), Decker is assisted in solving crimes by his Orthodox Jewish wife Rina Lazarus.

When he meets Rina, a young widow, during an investigation at a yeshiva in The Ritual Bath, he is compelled to explore the religion for himself, and eventually became a religiously observant Orthodox Jew. Decker, though raised Baptist by his adoptive parents in Florida, discovers as an adult that his birth parents were Jewish, which makes him Jewish under traditional Jewish law, as well. All the books in the series are rooted in, or at least include, Jewish themes. Aside from "Peter" - a name with obvious Christian origin and connotations - he has a Jewish name, "Akiva" - the name of a famous ancient Jewish sage. To his police colleagues, he remains "Peter", "Loo", "Rabbi", or "Old Man", but at moments of special intimacy and tenderness, Rina calls him "Akivale". At moments of anger and confrontation, though, his stepsons, Rina's children, sometimes call him "Peter".

Major characters in the books include Rina's two sons by her late husband, Jacob and Samuel Lazarus; Cindy Decker, Peter's daughter from his first marriage; Rina and Peter's daughter Hannah Decker; and Peter's police partner Detective Marge Dunn. Cindy Decker, a teenager in the earliest books, eventually follows her father into the police force, and is the main character of two of the later books, Stalker and Street Dreams.

Decker's complicated background makes for continuing complications in his present. For example, the plot of Stone Kiss is launched by a call from his Jewish half-brother Jonathan - a rabbi in New York, with whom Decker shares a biological mother, but whom he met only in adulthood; the plot later also involves his Christian step-brother Randy, a policeman like himself residing in Florida. Unsurprisingly, Decker feels more comfortable with Randy - with whom he shares childhood experiences, though no biological relation.

== Novels in the series ==
- The Ritual Bath (1986)
- Sacred and Profane (1987)
- Milk and Honey (1990)
- Day of Atonement (1991)
- False Prophet (1992)
- Grievous Sin (1993)
- Sanctuary (1994)
- Justice (1995)
- Prayers for the Dead (1996)
- Serpent's Tooth (1997)
- Jupiter's Bones (1999)
- Stalker (2000)
- The Forgotten (2001)
- Stone Kiss (2002)
- Street Dreams (2003)
- The Burnt House (2007)
- The Mercedes Coffin (2008)
- Blindman's Bluff (2009)
- Hangman (2010)
- Gun Games (2011)
- The Beast (2013)
- Murder 101 (2014) - beginning here, the stories are set in upstate New York
- Theory of Death (2015)
- Bone Box (2017)
- Walking Shadows (2018)
- The Lost Boys (2020)
- The Hunt (2022)
