= Cindy Estrada =

American labor leader

- Education: BA in Education
- Alma mater: University of Michigan
- Occupation: Trade union leader
- Known for: Vice president of UAW
- Spouse: Frank White
- Children: 2

Cindy Estrada is an American trade union leader, the former vice president of the United Auto Workers union, and an activist for women's rights and worker's rights. She served as UAW vice president from 2010 through her retirement in 2022, and was the first Latina to fill the role.

== Education ==
Estrada graduated with a Bachelor of Arts in education from the University of Michigan and originally had planned on becoming a teacher. After graduating from college, she had the opportunity to work on a campaign alongside farmworkers and civil rights activist Dolores Huerta, organizing with the United Farm Workers union. She cites these experiences in drawing her towards becoming a labor organizer.

== Career ==
Estrada began working for the UAW in 1995. Soon after joining, she helped to organize workers at Mexican Industries, resulting in "one of the UAW's largest victories among Spanish-speaking manufacturing workers". Estrada was elected to her first term as UAW vice president in 2010. In this role, Estrada was the lead negotiator responsible for over 17,000 UAW members within Michigan.

In 2014, Estrada took over as head of UAW's General Motors Department, becoming the first woman and first Latina to fill the role. She was also elected to her second term as UAW vice president.

IN 2017, Estrada was considered "of interest" in a federal investigation regarding misappropriated funds for a training center jointly operated by UAW and Fiat Chrysler. Estrada was never charged or named in any court filings, but corruption charges were brought against her immediate predecessor, Joe Ashton, who was eventually convicted.

In 2018, Estrada took over leadership of the Stellantis department (formerly the Fiat Chrysler Automobiles department).

Estrada announced her retirement as UAW vice president in 2022.

=== Advocacy ===
Estrada is both an advocate for women's rights and worker's rights. On the topic of women's rights, Estrada has stated how she "strongly believes that women need to take a seat at the table in order to be heard". For worker's rights, Estrada has cited studies that show how unionization has yielded higher wages and benefits for Latinos. Calling it an "economic issue", Estrada has said: "We need to get to a place where it becomes unacceptable for company executives to be making $20 million a year while they pay their workers $10 an hour."

In 2021, Estrada was awarded the Jewish Labor Committee's 2021 Human Rights Award. UAW president Ray Curry said that: “Cindy works every day with a goal of preserving the dignity of all human rights in our workplace and our society".

== Personal life ==
Estrada is the mother of twin boys.
