= Cindy Amaiza =

HIV activist

- Born: Cindy Amaiza
- Occupation: Youth Health Programmer
- Known for: Founder of Y+ Kenya
- Notable work: She is associated with Partnership to Inspire, Transform, and Connect the HIV response (PITCH) partner organization.; Ambassador for Youth and Adolescent Reproductive Health Program (AYARHEP).

Cindy Amaiza is a Kenyan HIV/AIDS activist. She is an MPH student living in Nairobi. She is associated with Partnership to Inspire, Transform, and Connect the HIV response (PITCH) partner organization Ambassador for Youth and Adolescent Reproductive Health Program (AYARHEP). She is also the founder of Y+ Kenya, which united young people living with HIV such as herself from six separate Kenyan organizations into a national AYPLHIV network.

== Activism ==
I envision a unified voice of young people living with HIV to be better able to address the challenges and issues young people, who are disproportionally affected by HIV and AIDS, are facing.

— Cindy Amaiza

Soon after founding Y+ Kenya in late 2017, Amaiza, as national coordinator, found that many of her peers were taking expired antiretroviral medications. Y+ Kenya brought the issue to the Kenyan Ministry of Health, which at first denied the existence of an issue. After the network presented testimony from about 40 young people, the Ministry stated that antiretrovirals had a shelf life three months past the expiration date, but under further pressure from Amaiza's group, the Ministry contacted the involved health centers and arranged for fresh replacement medication to be given to those affected.

The group also campaigned for more HIV-positive people to be consulted in decisions by the Ministry of Health and The National Syndemic Diseases Control Council.

As of 2019, Y+ Kenya had six member organizations, all led by and serving people age 10–30. Each focuses on different issues, such as transactional sex, adolescent sexual and reproductive health and rights, mental health, young female sex workers, and female drug users.

Amaiza also worked to improve Kenya's planned universal health coverage (UHC). Young people with HIV campaigned against its launch, as the National Health Insurance Fund would have required payments for 6 to 12 months before access to healthcare, and had little coverage. Surveying her community, Amaiza's group collected opinions on improving the UHC plan, and advocated for some of those ideas to be included in the Kenya AIDS Strategic Framework (KASF).
