= List of listed buildings in Morvern, Highland =

This is a list of listed buildings in the parish of Morvern in Highland, Scotland, United Kingdom.

== List ==
Name	Location	Date Listed	Grid Ref. (Note: Sometimes known as OSGB36, the grid reference (where provided) is based on the British national grid reference system used by the Ordnance Survey. • "Guide to National Grid". Ordnance Survey. • "Get-a-map". Ordnance Survey.)	Geo-coordinates	Notes	LB Number (Note: Historic Environment Scotland assign a unique alphanumeric identifier to each designated site in Scotland, for listed buildings this always begins with "LB", for example "LB12345".)	Image
Ardtornish Estate 1,2,3,4,5,6, Larachbeg				56°34′12″N 5°45′15″W	Category B	13961	Upload Photo
"Glenmorvern Cottage" And Walled Garden				56°35′33″N 5°57′52″W	Category B	13940	Upload Photo
Laudale House				56°40′35″N 5°40′33″W	Category C(S)	13942	Upload Photo
Lochaline, 1-5 (Inclusive Nos) High Street				56°32′17″N 5°46′39″W	Category B	13947	Upload Photo
Ardtornish Estate, Beach House				56°37′06″N 5°38′22″W	Category C(S)	48287	Upload Photo
Ardtornish Estate Castle Cottages				56°33′46″N 5°45′00″W	Category B	13955	Upload Photo
Ardtornish Estate Larachbeg Old Laundry				56°34′14″N 5°45′15″W	Category C(S)	13962	Upload Photo
Drimnin, St Columba's Roman Catholic Church				56°37′20″N 5°59′57″W	Category B	13938	Upload another image
Fiunary Old Manse (Former Church Of Scotland Manse)				56°33′09″N 5°52′40″W	Category B	13939	Upload Photo
Killintag Burial Ground, Stewart Mausoleum				56°36′45″N 5°58′14″W	Category B	13941	Upload another image
By Lochaline, Keil House				56°32′31″N 5°47′29″W	Category B	13946	Upload Photo
Ardtornish Estate Ardtornish Tower, Mansion And Clock Tower				56°33′48″N 5°44′23″W	Category A	13951	Upload another image See more images
Ardtornish Estate Bay Cottage, Inninbeg				56°31′31″N 5°44′57″W	Category B	13953	Upload another image
Ardtornish Estate Ferry House				56°32′14″N 5°46′16″W	Category C(S)	13954	Upload Photo
Ardtornish Estate, Claggan School And Schoolhouse With Former Playground And Enclosing Walls				56°34′58″N 5°44′54″W	Category B	13956	Upload Photo
Ardtornish Estate, (Old) Ardtornish Steading				56°31′28″N 5°45′14″W	Category B	13952	Upload Photo
Ardtornish Estate Clounlaid				56°36′28″N 5°40′03″W	Category B	13957	Upload Photo
Claggan Achadh Nan Gamhna Bridge Over River Aline				56°34′56″N 5°45′05″W	Category C(S)	13964	Upload Photo
By Lochaline Keil Church Of Scotland, Session House And Walled Enclosure				56°32′26″N 5°47′23″W	Category C(S)	13944	Upload Photo
By Lochaline, Keil Church Burial Ground And Remains Of Medieval Church				56°32′24″N 5°47′27″W	Category B	13945	Upload Photo
Laudale Estate, Achleek House				56°40′47″N 5°36′16″W	Category B	48088	Upload Photo
Ardtornish Estate Old Boathouse				56°33′40″N 5°44′38″W	Category B	13963	Upload another image
Ardtornish Estate Achranich Manager's House And Estate Office				56°33′42″N 5°44′17″W	Category B	13949	Upload another image
Drimnin Estate, Dorlin Cottage				56°39′25″N 5°54′21″W	Category B	48288	Upload Photo
Ardtornish Estate Kinlochaline Castle				56°33′51″N 5°44′56″W	Category B	13960	Upload another image
Ardtornish Estate Acharn Farmhouse				56°35′22″N 5°44′45″W	Category C(S)	13948	Upload Photo
Drimnin, Mungasdale House				56°36′43″N 5°57′56″W	Category C(S)	48080	Upload Photo
Ardtornish Estate, Rose Cottage				56°33′57″N 5°44′53″W	Category C(S)	19880	Upload another image
Ardtornish Estate Durinemast				56°36′11″N 5°47′50″W	Category B	13958	Upload Photo
By Lochaline Achnaha Cottages And Steading				56°32′34″N 5°49′58″W	Category B	13943	Upload Photo
Ardtornish Estate Achranich Smith's Barn				56°33′42″N 5°44′13″W	Category C(S)	13950	Upload Photo
Ardtonish Estate, Single Cable Suspension Bridge				56°35′11″N 5°44′55″W	Category B	50848	Upload Photo
Ardtornish Estate The Ivy Bridge Over River Aline				56°33′51″N 5°44′53″W	Category B	13959	Upload Photo

== Key ==
The scheme for classifying buildings in Scotland is:

- Category A: "buildings of national or international importance, either architectural or historic; or fine, little-altered examples of some particular period, style or building type."
- Category B: "buildings of regional or more than local importance; or major examples of some particular period, style or building type, which may have been altered."
- Category C: "buildings of local importance; lesser examples of any period, style, or building type, as originally constructed or moderately altered; and simple traditional buildings which group well with other listed buildings."

In March 2016 there were 47,288 listed buildings in Scotland. Of these, 8% were Category A, and 50% were Category B, with the remaining 42% being Category C.

== See also ==
- List of listed buildings in Highland
