= Cindy Jaynes =

American rear-admiral

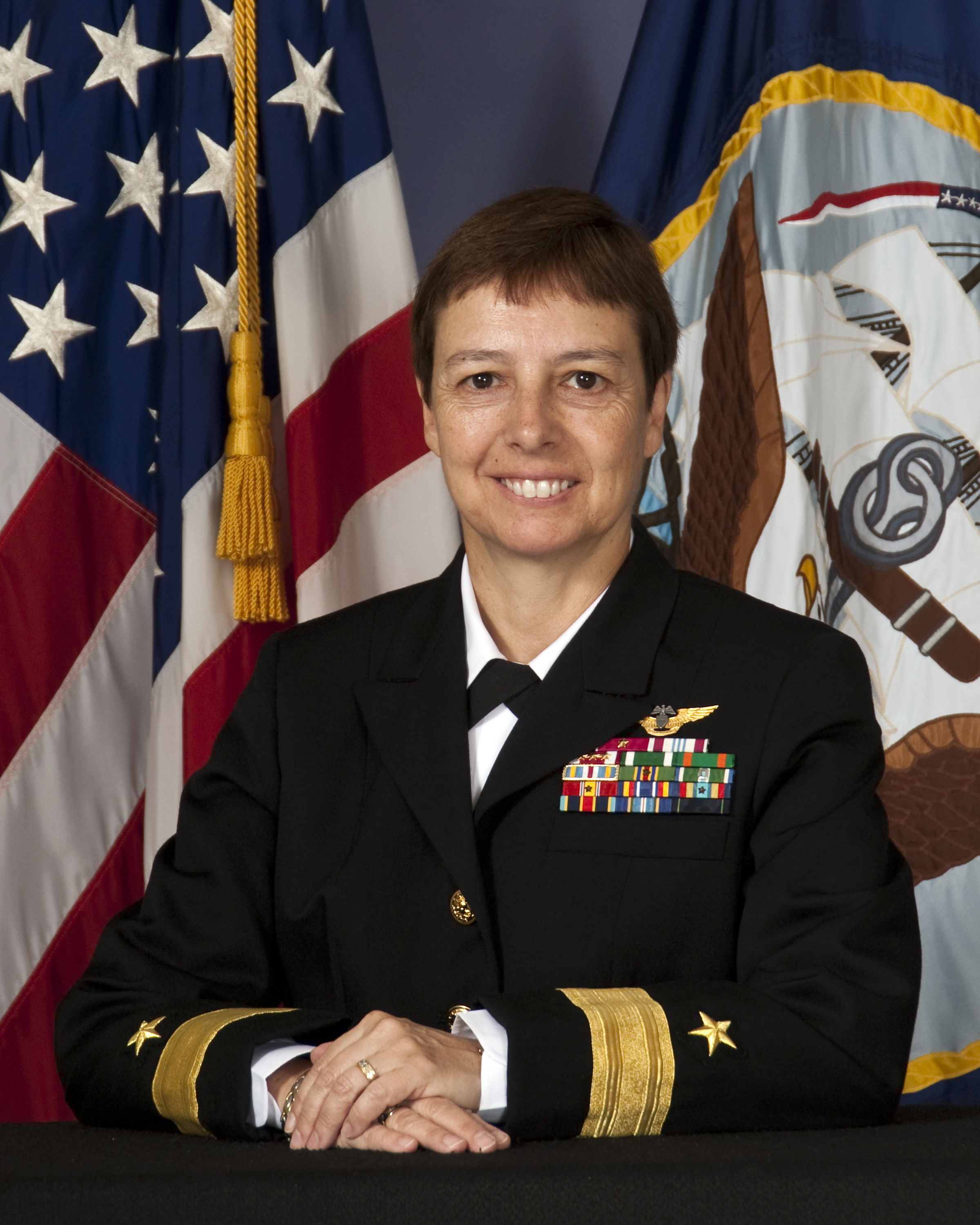
- Rear Admiral Cindy Jaynes
- Born: Cindy Louise Jaynes; 1959 (age 66–67); Greensburg, Pennsylvania
- Military career
- Allegiance: United States
- Branch: United States Navy
- Service years: 1983–2016
- Rank: Rear Admiral
- Awards: Legion of Merit (3); Meritorious Service Medal (5); Navy and Marine Corps Commendation Medal; Navy and Marine Corps Achievement Medal; National Defense Service Medal (with Service Star); Global War on Terrorism Service Medal

Cindy Louise Jaynes (born 1959) is an American retired rear-admiral. An aeronautics maintenance specialist, she managed several programs relating to US Navy aircraft. Jaynes became the first female flag officer in Naval Air Systems Command when she was promoted to rear-admiral on 1 August 2012. She retired from the US Navy on 1 May 2016.

== Career ==
Cindy Jaynes grew up in Greensburg, Pennsylvania and was awarded a bachelor of sciences degree in mathematics education in 1979 followed by a master's degree in mathematics in 1982 from the Indiana University of Pennsylvania. Jaynes had considered a career as an actuary or a veterinarian but was persuaded by a high school friend to join the US Navy for four years whilst she considered her future. She attended the US Navy Officer Candidate School in Newport, Rhode Island and was commissioned in March 1983. She was assigned as an aeronautics maintenance officer in 1985. She served many operational tours within the United States and at Diego Garcia. Jaynes managed programs relating to the Lockheed P-3 Orion, McDonnell Douglas F/A-18 Hornet and the Boeing EA-18G Growler. One of her programs won the Naval Air Systems Command (NAVAIR) prize for project management. In 1995 she completed a command and staff course at the Naval War College and was awarded a systems engineering certificate from the California Institute of Technology in 1999. Jaynes received a Master of Business Administration degree from Norwich University in 2008.

Jaynes became assistant commander for logistics and industrial operations in NAVAIR in July 2011 and was commander of its fleet readiness centres from August 2012. She was promoted to the rank of rear admiral on 1 August 2012, becoming the first female flag officer in NAVAIR and the first female aerospace maintenance officer of that rank.

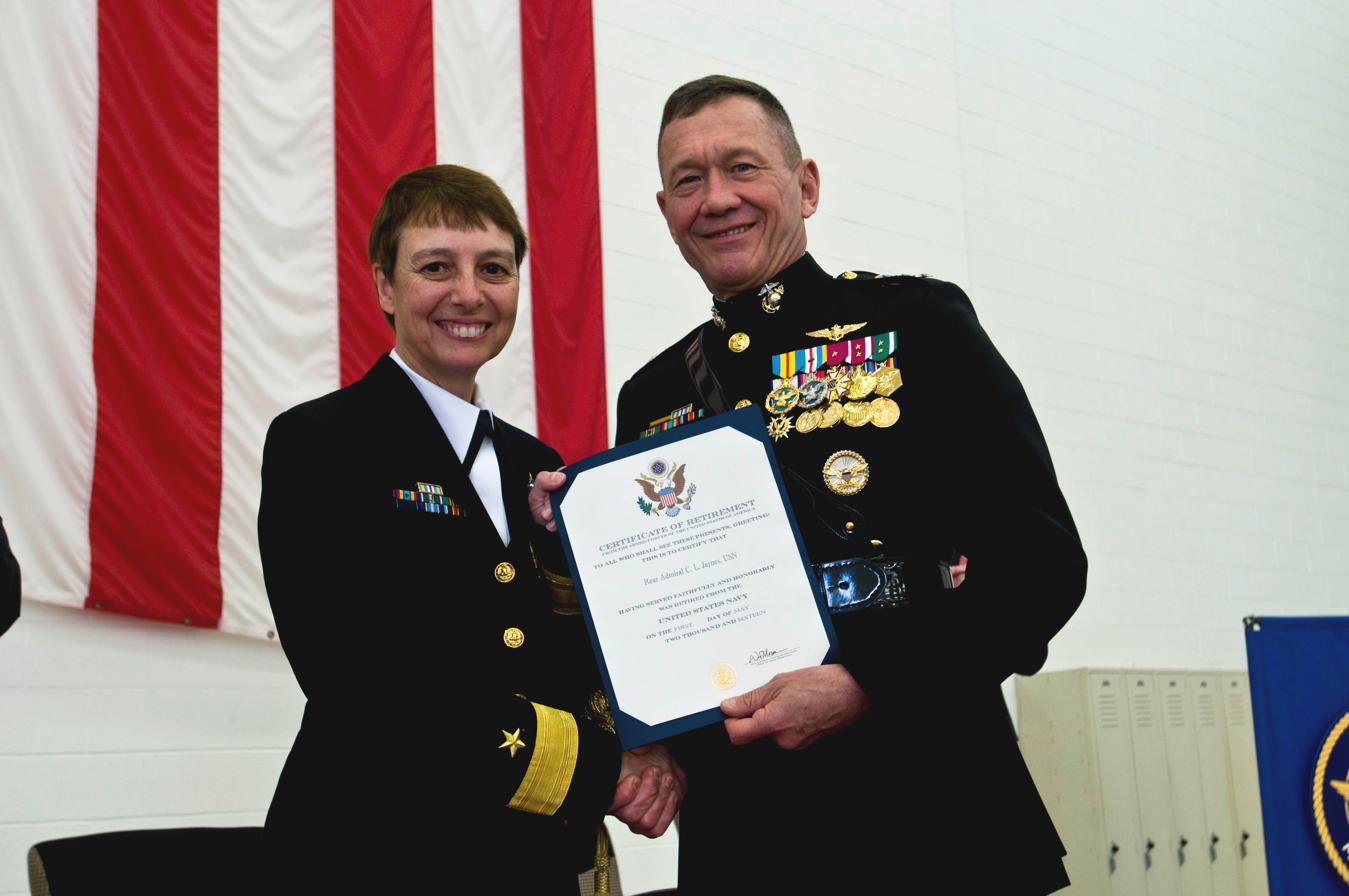
Jaynes receiving her retirement certificate from Marine Corps Lt. Gen. Jon Davis.

She later became executive officer of the air anti-submarine warfare, assault and special mission programs of the US Navy. She has received the Legion of Merit three times, the Meritorious Service Medal four times as well as the Navy and Marine Corps Commendation Medal, Navy and Marine Corps Achievement Medal, National Defense Service Medal (with Service Star) and the Global War on Terrorism Service Medal. Jaynes retired from the US Navy on 1 May 2016 after 33 years service.
