= Cindi Love =

American entrepreneur and businessperson

Cynthia Love is an American human rights advocate, executive, author, public speaker,entrepreneur and businessperson. She is former executive of publicly traded TORO, academic administrator, and retired ordained minister who started eight companies, several non profits and served for four years as the executive director of the Metropolitan Community Church and three years as ED of Soulforce

During her tenure as MCC's chief operating officer and business manager, Love played a role in the advocacy for human rights around the world. She developed the Would Jesus Discriminate Campaign in partnership with then Jesus MCC in Indianapolis and its pastor, Rev Jeff Miner and Mitchell Gold's Faith in America team. She has also served on the Faith and Religion Council for the Human Rights Campaign. She was awarded the Bohnett Fellowship and attended an executive education program for local and state officials at Harvard's Kennedy School.

== Education and early career ==
A native of Abilene, Texas, Love holds a Master of Arts from Louisiana Tech, and a doctorate in educational administration from Texas Tech University. She applied her educational training to using technology in the classroom and to forming community-school partnerships; her efforts were recognized by the Texas legislature and by Governor Ann Richards. She was later named the Executive Dean of Brookhaven College in Dallas, Texas.

Love also spent many years in the business sector, founding such companies as Ecommune, a business intended for advising Fortune 500 companies and technology ventures in Israel, School Vision of Texas, INC 500 member C.H. Love & Co., which was later bought by New Mexico Information Systems, and ICSS, Inc., which was acquired by The Toro Company, for which she guided a project that created a worldwide Intranet network, and served as both director of customer service systems and manager of global customer information systems.

From Toro, Love moved to other projects, including being the CEO of Friendly Robotics. Her experience with technology was also called upon by NASA and by the Texas legislature. For her business work, she was named one of the "Top 50 Entrepreneurs" in North America by Inc. Magazine, MIT and YEO in 1990. She has served on numerous not-for-profit boards and committees for educational, business, and LGBT interests.

Love has been the CEO and founder of a number of other corporations, including School Vision of Texas, Network in a Box, Apple Education Assistance Network, New Mexico Information Systems, and Integration Control Systems & Services.

== Ministry ==
Love grew up in the Church of Christ, was active in citywide ministry programs from a young age, married a minister from the church, but transferred to a Southern Baptist church after her divorce. She was also active in local advocacy groups on issues regarding rehabilitation and disability services, workplace discrimination and HIV/AIDS issues; for instance, she was a long-time director of one of the West Texas Rehabilitation Center's advocacy programs, and she and her spouse later founded the Abilene Community Advocacy Program. She later founded FAMLO, a non-profit organization addressing health issues around drug addiction and HIV/AIDS. and most recently they founded Uncommon Tribe, a non-profit located in Abilene, Texas.

After leaving Toro and while working at Brookhaven, Love began serving on the MCC Board of Administrators; during this time, she completed her credentials for ordination in the denomination and took an interim post at MCC of Greater Dallas. Between January 2005 and May 2009, Love served as the executive director for the MCC denomination. Love was appointed executive director of the liberally-oriented (although still based on the Apostle's and Nicene Creeds) Metropolitan Community Church in January 2005.

Love is also the author of Would Jesus Discriminate? The 21st Century Question. This book is part of a broader campaign to prompt churches to consider the ways that religious attitudes against homosexuality may contribute to wider discrimination against gays and lesbians. Although the campaign began in 2006, it continues to influence the discussion. News articles from 2009 show that churches are still hosting "town halls" on the issue in places like Anchorage, Alaska, and that people are still using the slogan at marriage-equality rallies in Bloomington, Indiana and in Harrisburg, Pennsylvania.

== Personal ==
Love has two children from her first marriage. In 2005 she married Sue Jennings in Canada after the country introduced legislation permitting same-sex marriages. They later announced plans to marry under Californian law at a ceremony to be conducted in Los Angeles on June 24, 2008.
