= The Milk & Honey Distillery =

Israeli whisky distillery

Coordinates: 24.7137°N 121.6919°E

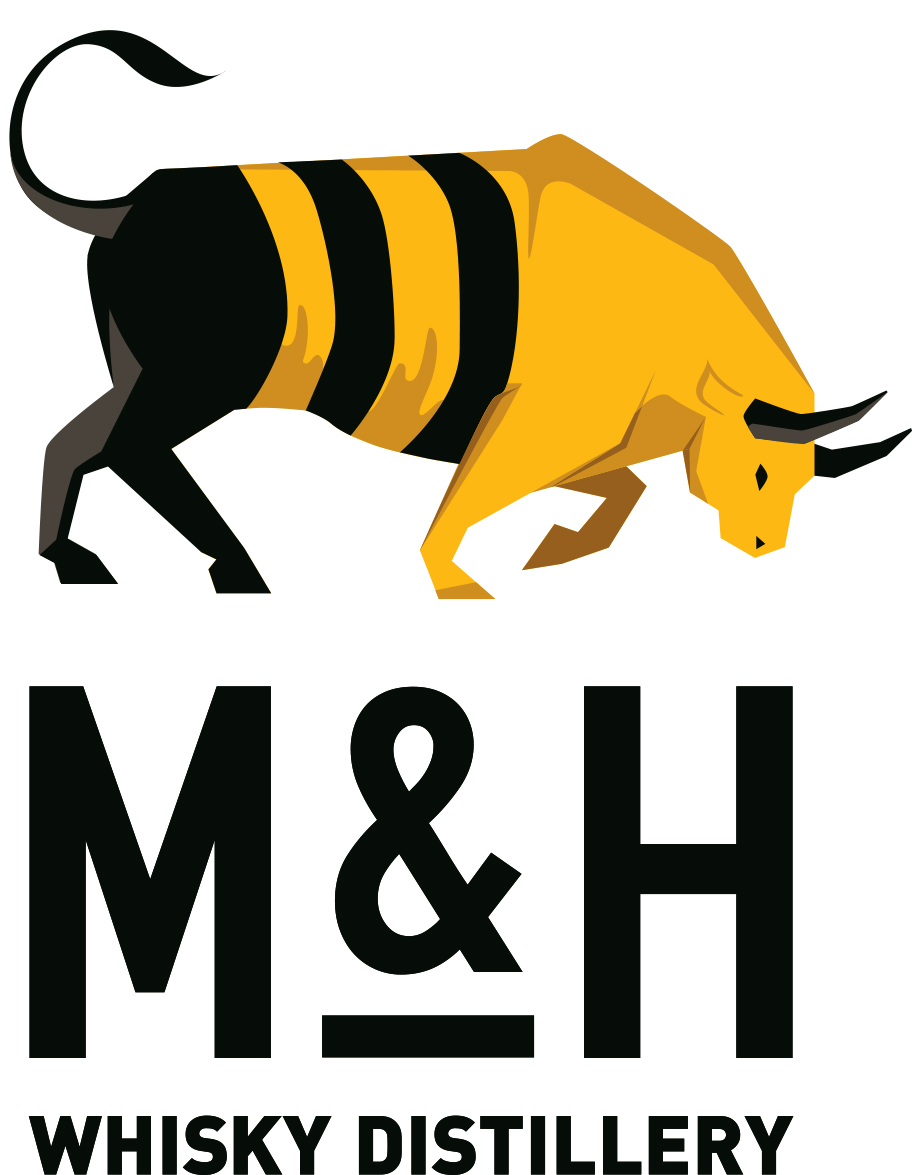
- Logo of The Milk & Honey Distillery
- Owner: GKI Group
- Founded: 2012
- Founder: Gal Kalkshtein
- Status: Active
- Website: mh-distillery.com

Milk & Honey (M&H; Hebrew: חלב ודבש) is Israel's first and largest single malt whisky distillery.

It began operating in 2013 in the south of Tel Aviv. Besides manufacturing, there’s also a visitor center, where visitors can learn more about the distilling process and enjoy whisky tastings.

All of the distillery’s products are Kosher.

== History ==
The plans for the distillery began in 2012, after a group of entrepreneurs: Gal Kalkshtein, the owner of the distillery, along with Amit Dror, Simon Fried, and Roee and Naama Licht decided to establish the first whisky distillery in Israel. Since its establishment, the distillery's operations were accompanied by Dr. James Swan, a world-renowned whisky expert, until he died in February 2017.

Since the distillery's founding, the Head Distiller has been Tomer Goren.

The distillery's first products reached the shelves during the first quarter of 2016. In May 2017, the distillery unveiled Israel's first-ever single-malt whisky, made by its Head Distiller, Tomer Goren. Their whiskey, aged for more than 3 years, has been noted to be well-matured due to Israel's warm climate affecting and accelerating the aging process.

The distillery's name is a reference to the biblical phrase "The Land of Milk and Honey".

== Awards and recognition ==
In 2023, the distillery was awarded the title of the Best Single Malt Whisky in the world at the prestigious World Whiskies Awards for its Elements Sherry Cask - a Single Malt Whisky that matured in sherry and bourbon casks. Additionally, the distillery received several other awards at the Icons of Whisky competition

Best Craft Distillery in the World for 2021 at the Icons of Whisky competition by "Whisky Magazine."

Award for the Most Innovative Distillery in the World (Brand Innovator of the Year) for 2022 at the Icons of Whisky competition by "Whisky Magazine."

== Gallery ==
Distillation Stills

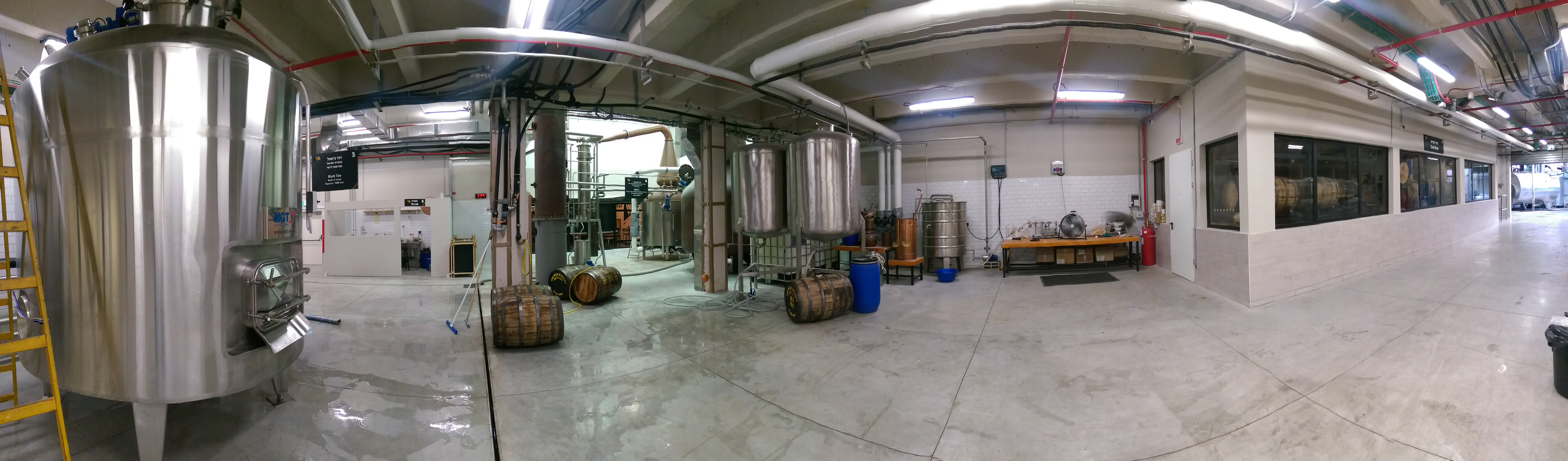
Production area at the distillery

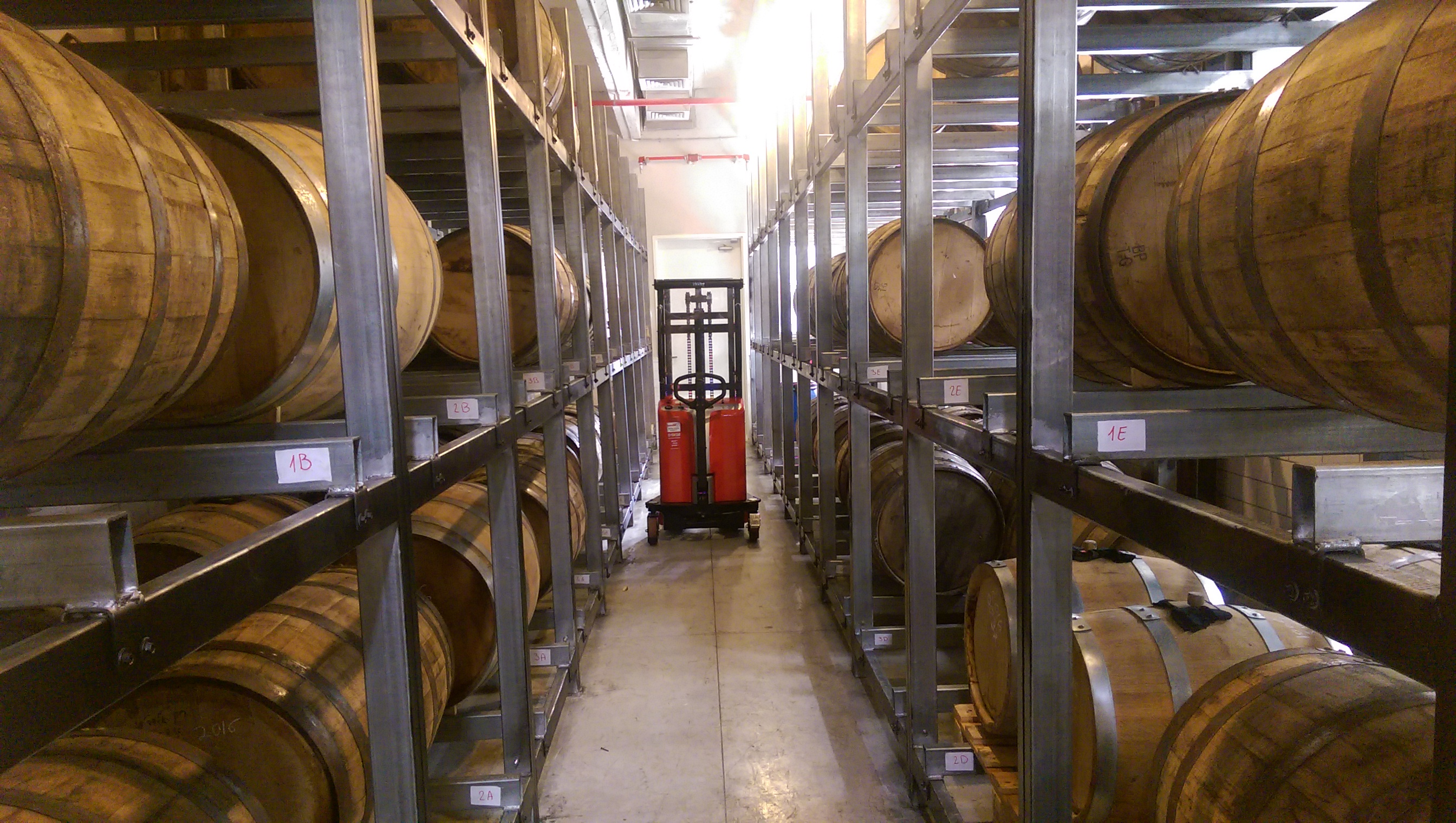
Warehouse #01

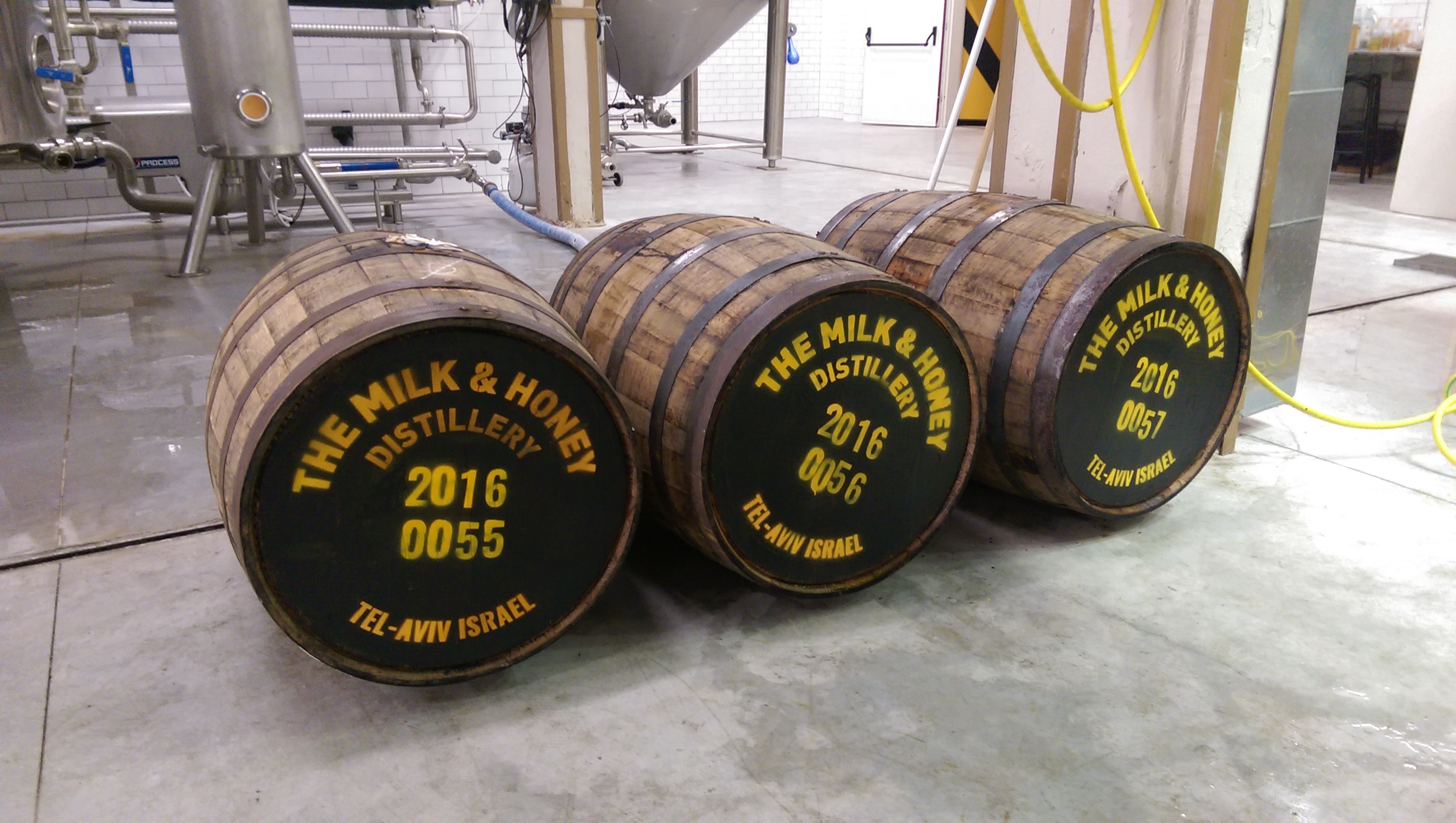
Barrels at the distillery

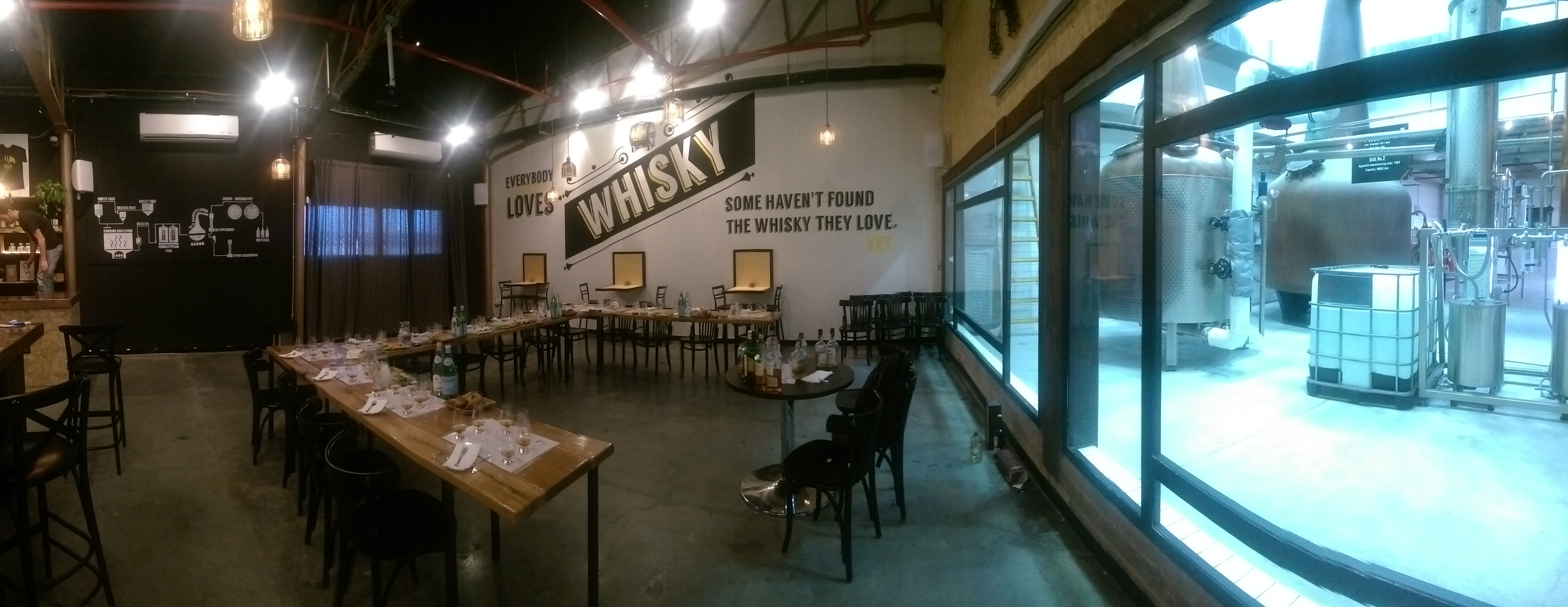
The visitor center at the distillery
