= Alex Delaware =

- Alex Delaware character
- First appearance: When the Bough Breaks
- Created by: Jonathan Kellerman
- Portrayed by: Ted Danson

In-universe information
- Gender: Male
- Occupation: Forensic psychologist for LAPD
- Nationality: American
- Dogs: French Bulldog; Koi

Alex Delaware is a literary character created by American writer Jonathan Kellerman. The Alex Delaware detective series begins with When the Bough Breaks, published in 1985. Delaware appears in 39 of Kellerman's popular murder mysteries. Kellerman set the series in Los Angeles. Delaware is a forensic psychologist, although Kellerman wrote a back story in which Delaware practiced as a child psychologist.

Delaware has a friend, Milo Sturgis, who is a gay LAPD detective. Delaware helps Sturgis in his investigations, and the detective, who eventually reaches the rank of lieutenant, appears in each book in the series. As the series progresses, Delaware's relationship with Robin Castagna evolves, despite two long separations, during which various other romantic interests are introduced. In some of the more recent books in the series, Detective Petra Connor, introduced in Kellerman's standalone novel Billy Straight, also makes an appearance.

== The Post-Modern Detective ==
Alex Delaware (born in 1951) is empathetic and caring with particular emphasis on his concern for children. In Alex Delaware, Kellerman draws a hero who appears to be "a levelheaded, appealingly thoughtful guy". Kellerman also provides Alex Delaware with a side-kick, LAPD detective Milo Sturgis, as is customary in the mystery genre. It is also revealed that his mother was a manic-depressive and his father a raging, physically abusive alcoholic. Kellerman also adds a girlfriend, Robin Castagna, and a French Bulldog, which serve to emphasize Delaware's empathetic nature. In several novels, Alex and Robin break up. Alex begins dating Dr. Alison Gwynn, also a Ph.D., clinical psychologist, while Robin dates Tim Plachette, a voice coach.

'I tried to create Alex as a good psychologist,' says Kellerman, 'Actually he's much more sensitive than I am. But then, I get to rewrite his dialogue .... When you do therapy as a psychologist you focus on the patient,' [Kellerman] says. 'You keep yourself out of it as much as possible. Basically you sit there and try to get that person to communicate to you. So Alex asks people to talk to him. He doesn't inject a lot of himself in there.'
—Jonathan Kellerman

Kellerman's characterization of Delaware is typical of the "Post-Modern Detective" whom Professor Dick Gibson defines as "often an untrained amateur ... often sensitive, caring, thoughtful and socially aware, and he is often from a traditionally noninvolved group." Kellerman characterizes Delaware as "sensitive, socially involved, loving and passionate about his patients and his family relationships and cynical only about 'bad guys.'" Additionally, Kellerman brings a professional "sophistication" to the series.

Delaware's friend Milo Sturgis, adds to the portrayal of the post-modern detective. As Gibson explains: "[The] other important male role is Milo, a career policeman, a big shambling bear of a man, but, in a stunning role reversal, he is gay." Milo, Gibson points out, "the gay cop all too often functions as the cavalry. Delaware as amateur Knight Errant often gets into horrendous nightmare difficulties."

In the American Psychological Association Patrick McGuire writes about Kellerman's characterization of Delaware: "Alex Delaware's style is unlike that of the typical hard-nosed private eye. He goes about his work by interacting sympathetically with the people he meets and by quiet, professional observation. Kellerman says an empathetic psychologist is an ideal model for a detective."

Some reviewers, however, have criticized the Delaware novels based on overly intricate plotting, too much description of unnecessary elements, and "formula characters."

== Plot summaries ==
When the Bough Breaks (1985)

Kellerman introduces Alex Delaware, Ph.D., in When the Bough Breaks. Kellerman characterizes Delaware as a successful (albeit retired) child psychologist suffering from burn-out after working on a case of systematic child molestation that culminates when the offender commits suicide in Delaware's office. Detective Milo Sturgis urges Delaware to come out of retirement and interview a seven-year-old child who may have witnessed a crime. Sturgis appoints Delaware as a "special consultant" to the Los Angeles Police Department. Kellerman's timing in this novel coincided with news stories about child abuse in child care facilities. The book was adapted as a 1986 film starring Ted Danson as Alex and Richard Masur as Milo.

Blood Test (1986)

In Blood Test, Alex Delaware acts as a consultant in the divorce and child custody case of Richard Moody, a bipolar and potentially dangerous father of two. At the same time, Delaware is contacted by a former colleague, Dr. Raoul Melendez-Lynch, of the oncology department at Western Pediatric Medical Center. Dr. Raoul Melendez-Lynch asks Delaware to consult with Mr. and Mrs. Swope whose child, Woody, needs treatment for cancer. Before Delaware has the opportunity to visit Woody, he vanishes from the hospital and the parents turn up murdered. Delaware sorts through a maze of clues to find the child. Additionally, Kellerman highlights the issue of established medical treatments and new "cult cures" for children.

Over the Edge (1987)

In Over the Edge, Kellerman presents Delaware's back story as a researcher in the study "Project 160", that involved the treatment of gifted children. As the novel opens, Delaware receives a phone call from Jamey Cadmus, who had been involved in the research project. Jamey has been arrested and accused of being a serial killer who preys on young male prostitutes. Delaware is hired by Cadmus' attorney to investigate. In this novel, Kellerman examines preconceived notions about homosexuality; and he examines how others perceive Delaware because of his friendship with Milo Sturgis. In the course of the investigation, Delaware eliminates the obvious clues and discovers a greater evil than he imagined. Additionally, Kellerman investigates psychological problems resulting from childhood genius.

Silent Partner (1989)

In Silent Partner, Kellerman has Delaware involved in a romantic interlude with a former girlfriend. Delaware's lover apparently commits suicide, and he begins an investigation into her death. His lover's identity becomes the focus of the investigation, as Delaware peels away layer after layer to discover a maze of childhood abuse.

Time Bomb (1990)

Time Bomb highlights a school shooting at a Los Angeles elementary school; although the only fatality is the shooter herself, Holly Lynn Burden. Holly's father contacts Delaware and asks him to perform a psychological autopsy. During the course of the investigation Delaware encounters dysfunctional families and political extremism as he races to unravel the real villain as he pulls together all the threads.

Private Eyes (1992)

In Private Eyes, former patient Melissa Dickinson contacts Delaware with a request to investigate a past crime. Her mother, Gina Dickinson had been the victim of an acid attack before Melissa's birth and subsequently suffered from agoraphobia. Shortly after Delaware contacts Dickinson, she disappears. With the help of Milo Sturgis, Delaware begins an investigation into the disappearance.

Devil's Waltz (1993)

In Devil's Waltz, Delaware is asked to investigate the case of 20-month-old Cassie Jones, who is frequently hospitalized. The investigation leads Delaware to uncover secrets within Western Pediatric Hospital and to a "chilling discovery." When a physician is found murdered, Delaware turns to previous murders for clues to the puzzle.

Bad Love (1994)

In Bad Love, Kellerman presents Delaware with an incident involving an anonymous cassette tape with the sound of a screaming child and chants of "bad love". The phrase refers to a seminar Delaware participated in when employed at Western Pediatrics. As usual, his interview skills provide the clues to keep the sleuthing psychologist moving from locale to locale. The action culminates in a fiery climax, when Delaware's canyon home is destroyed.

Self-Defense (1995)

Thirteen months after the events in Bad Love, Delaware meets a former patient who sat on the jury in a serial killer case. The woman suffers recurring nightmares. Delaware must unravel two puzzles: the young woman's recurring nightmares; and the present-day patient who may be the target of a killer. Unraveling the two strands, Kellerman has Delaware face repressed memories, murder groupies, jailhouse autobiographers, all on the trail of a serial killer.

The Web (1996)

Delaware and his girlfriend Robin travel to an island where Delaware assists a doctor collect and organize his works. A complicated plot, laced with ever-present murder, and a weird experiment gone terribly wrong is woven through the uneven writing, uncharacteristic for Kellerman.

The Clinic (1997)

In The Clinic Kellerman presents Delaware with a cold case of murder, and the victim was a "pop psychology" author named Hope Devane. When Sturgis gets the cold case he calls in pal and psychologist Delaware hoping to find insights to Devane's life. The two uncover an execution style crime, her compartmentalized life, and her link to a second murder victim. However, Delaware's turns his forensic psychology skills toward her childhood where he finds answers, danger, and a killer.

Survival of the Fittest (1997)

In the previous books, Kellerman often used a first person narrative form with Alex Delaware's voice, as well as the more objective third person. Character insights have been limited to those observations made by Delaware. However, in this novel, while the first person is limited to Delaware, there are also multiple presentations of the internal perspective of the character of Daniel Sharavi.

Monster (1999)

In the thirteenth novel of the Delaware series, Kellerman paints an end-of-millennium Los Angeles reminiscent of Kenneth Millar's works, to whom Kellerman dedicates Monster. Delaware and Sturgis investigate a crime that leads them to an inmate in the Starkweather Hospital for the Criminally Insane. As usual the plot twists as Delaware and Sturgis uncover the monster living openly in society. The novel also offers a realistic depiction of a mental disorder caused by psychiatric drugs; and features a character, wrongfully blamed for a multiple murder, who suffers mental illness as a result of psychoactive medication.

Dr. Death (2000)

In Dr. Death, Kellerman opens with a corpse found in the Hollywood Hills area, and Alex Delaware is called in to help. Delaware, teamed up with Sturgis, investigates the grisly death of the victim, a Jack Kevorkian type assisted suicide doctor known as "Dr. Death" the victim. Suspects abound with relatives of Dr. Death's "victims". Detective Petra Connor, who Kellerman introduced in Billy Straight, puts in an appearance and helps Sturgis and Delaware.

Flesh and Blood (2001)

In this novel, Delaware receives a call from a former patient's mother, whose daughter is missing. Delaware last saw her at a bachelor party performing as a stripper. Once again, he finds himself in dangerous situations as he attempts to help Sturgis uncover clues.

The Murder Book (2002)

In The Murder Book, Jonathan Kellerman presents a new and "spellbinding" case for Delaware and Sturgis. Delaware receives a photo album from an unknown source that chronicles a number of murders. Sturgis recognizes the photo of a victim from one of his unsolved crimes two decades earlier. The first part of the novel focuses on Sturgis' early career and a cover-up that's lasted to the present.

A Cold Heart (2003)

In A Cold Heart, Kellerman has Milo Sturgis tell Delaware "I've got a weird one, so naturally I thought of you." Sturgis summons Delaware to an art gallery where a young artist has been murdered and the scene suggests to Delaware the work of a serial killer. Teaming up with Petra Connor and her new partner, Sturgis and Delaware follow the clues to a fanzine writer, and as they track down the clues to the killer, bringing them to the doorstep of Delaware's ex-lover Robin Castagna.

Therapy (2004)

In Therapy, Delaware and Sturgis investigate the death of a double murder on Mulholland Drive that leads to human rights' atrocities in Rwanda. Full of red herrings and clues, Kellerman throws out a plethora of psychological leads for Delaware.

Rage (2005)

In Rage Kellerman presents Delaware with a case of child abduction and murder. Upon his release from prison, the child murderer contacts Delaware, but is murdered himself. Teaming up with Milo Sturgis, Delaware encounter "wayward children, a foster family from hell....and a serial killer who's the exact opposite of the genre's usual madman slasher but just as deadly." Delaware and Sturgis sift the evidence piece by piece in this complicated case.

Gone (2006)

Delaware investigates the kidnapping of two aspiring young actors. When one of the actors is murdered, Delaware and Sturgis follow the clues that show the two were prey to an odd acting coach and an aspiring real estate developer.

Bones (2009)

In Bones, a wealthy teenager gets an unnerving message about something "real dead . . . buried in your marsh." Later, the body of a young piano teacher is found in the swamp. Delaware and Sturgis begin their investigation, as more bones begin to surface from the protected urban swamp. Delaware and Sturgis unearth the details of the young piano teacher's life.

Deception (2010)

In Deception, Deputy Chief Weinberg assigns LAPD Lt. Milo Sturgis the particularly sensitive murder case of Elise Freeman, a teacher and tutor at exclusive Windsor Preparatory Academy in Brentwood. Despite Elise's having left a DVD accusing three fellow teachers at the academy of repeated sexual harassment, Sturgis and Delaware have it made clear to them that their investigation is to involve the prestigious academy as little as possible. As the investigation reveals a victim that had a lot to hide and a boyfriend, students, teachers, administrators as well as a Deputy Chief who are all anxious to keep those secrets hidden—and at least one of them is willing to kill again.

Mystery (2011)

In Mystery, Delaware and Sturgis tackle the online dating world, when one of its sexy girls gets her face blown off in real time. Said website sets up sugar daddies with young women ("sweeties") looking for someone to take care of them, but all hell breaks loose when corpses variously mutilated start turning up and a rich family is somehow involved. Some interesting privacy issues in the cyberspace.

Victims (2012)

A serial killer à la Jack the Ripper, with disemboweled victims lined up in ritual precision, where compulsion and obsession mix in an explosive cocktail of violence and gore. A disturbing scenario that involves a former asylum and psychiatric malpractice: it's Alex's habitat indeed, and he knows how to move.

Killer (2014)

In Killer, Dr. Delaware becomes briefly embroiled in a bizarre custody battle between two sisters; one, a sophisticated, successful doctor, the other, an itinerant groupie. When the former is found murdered and the other disappears with her child, gay LAPD homicide detective Milo Sturgis will need Dr. Delaware's insight, expertise - and instinct - to solve the case.

Night Moves (2018)

Alex is called in to assist with a murder of a faceless victim, with whom the owners of the home the body is found in, the Corvins, are unfamiliar. The investigation uncovers that, aside from the Corvins, the rest of the community is particularly secretive and uncooperative, and unwilling to divulge information to Alex and the LAPD to solve this violent crime. Alex navigates the secrets of this well-to-do enclave of Los Angeles, exploring everything from the greed to shady sexual and deadly secrets, to get to the bottom of this case.

== Bibliography ==
The ISBN is for the first U.S. edition of each Alex Delaware novel:

- When the Bough Breaks (1985)
  ISBN 0-689-11519-9
- Blood Test (1986)
  ISBN 0-689-11634-9
- Over the Edge (1987)
  ISBN 0-689-11635-7
- Silent Partner (1989)
  ISBN 0-553-05370-1
- Time Bomb (1990)
  ISBN 0-553-05796-0
- Private Eyes (1992)
  ISBN 0-553-08013-X
- Devil's Waltz (1993)
  ISBN 0-553-09205-7
- Bad Love (1994)
  ISBN 0-553-08919-6
- Self-Defense (1995)
  ISBN 0-553-08920-X
- The Web (1996)
  ISBN 0-553-08921-8
- The Clinic (1997)
  ISBN 0-553-08922-6
- Survival of the Fittest (1997)
  ISBN 0-345-45884-2
- Monster (1999)
  ISBN 0-679-45960-X
- Dr. Death (2000)
  ISBN 0-679-45961-8
- Flesh and Blood
  (2001) ISBN 0-679-45962-6
- The Murder Book
  (2002) ISBN 0-345-45253-4
- A Cold Heart (2003)
  ISBN 0-345-45255-0
- Therapy (2004)
  ISBN 0-375-43370-8
- Rage (2005)
  ISBN 0-345-46706-X
- Gone (2006)
  ISBN 0-345-45261-5
- Obsession (2007)
  ISBN 978-0-345-45263-4
- Compulsion (2008)
  ISBN 0-345-45255-0
- Bones (2009)
  ISBN 978-0-345-49513-6
- Evidence (2010)
  ISBN 978-0-345-49519-8
- Deception (2010)
  ISBN 978-0-345-51923-8
- Mystery (2011)
  ISBN 978-0-345-50569-9
- Victims (2012)
  ISBN 978-0-345-50571-2
- Guilt (2013)
  ISBN 978-0-345-50573-6
- Killer (2014)
  ISBN 978-0345505750
- Motive (2015)
  ISBN 978-0345541376
- Breakdown (2016)
  ISBN 978-0345541406
- Heartbreak Hotel (2017)
  ISBN 978-0345541437
- Night Moves (2018)
  ISBN 978-0525590361
- The Wedding Guest (2019)
  ISBN 978-0-525-61849-2
- The Museum of Desire (2020)
  ISBN 978-0525618522
- Serpentine (2021)
  ISBN 978-0525618553
- City of the Dead (2022)
  ISBN 978-0525618584
- Unnatural History (2023)
  ISBN 978-0525618614
- The Ghost Orchid (2024)
  ISBN 978-0593822944
- Open Season (2025)
  ISBN 978-1804941690

== Adaptations ==
The first novel in the series, When the Bough Breaks, was adapted as a television film in 1986. Ted Danson starred as Alex Delaware with Richard Masur as Milo Sturgis.

A series is set to be produced by Amazon MGM Studios, to be written and executive produced by Jennifer Johnson.
