= Jonathan Kellerman =

American novelist

- Born: Jonathan Seth Kellerman; 9 August 1949 (age 77); New York City, New York, United States
- Occupation: Author
- Spouse: Faye Kellerman
- Children: 4, including Jesse
- Writing career
- Years active: 1985–present
- Genres: Mystery fiction, Thriller fiction
- Notable work: Alex Delaware series

Jonathan Seth Kellerman (born August 9, 1949) is an American novelist, psychologist, and Edgar- and Anthony Award–winning author best known for his popular mystery and psychological thriller novels featuring the character Alex Delaware, a child psychologist who consults for the Los Angeles Police Department.

== Early life and education ==
Born on the Lower East Side of New York City, his family relocated to Los Angeles when Kellerman was nine years old.

Kellerman stated in the New York Times that his parents kept "lots of books around the house, and their tastes were eclectic." It was through reading that he thought, "Maybe one day I can do this." One of those books, an American Art book also inspired his love of art. He was an illustrator during his college days and he still paints.

He received a Bachelor of Arts in psychology at UCLA in 1971. He worked his way through college as a cartoonist, editor, and guitar teacher. As a senior, he received a Samuel Goldwyn Writing Award.

Kellerman graduated from the University of Southern California (USC) with a PhD degree in clinical psychology in 1974. His doctoral research was on attribution of blame for childhood psychopathology, and he published a scientific paper on that topic at the age of 22.

== Career ==
After receiving his PhD, he began working as a staff psychologist after at the USC Keck School of Medicine, where he eventually became a clinical professor of pediatrics. He opened a private practice in the early 1980s, while writing novels on the side.

His first published novel, When the Bough Breaks, was published in 1985. He then wrote five best-selling novels while still a practicing psychologist. In 1990, he quit his private practice to write full-time. He has written more than 40 crime novels, as well as nonfiction works and children’s books.

== Personal life ==
Kellerman is married to fellow thriller novelist Faye Kellerman. They have four children, including writer Jesse Kellerman. Jonathan has collaborated with his wife and son on several works.

== Published works ==
=== Alex Delaware ===
1. When the Bough Breaks (1985)
2. Blood Test (1986)
3. Over the Edge (1987)
4. Silent Partner (1989)
5. Time Bomb (1990)
6. Private Eyes (1992)
7. Devil's Waltz (1993)
8. Bad Love (1994)
9. Self-Defense (1995)
10. The Web (1996)
11. The Clinic (1997)
12. Survival of the Fittest (1997)
13. Monster (1999)
14. Dr. Death (2000)
15. Flesh and Blood (2001)
16. The Murder Book (2002)
17. A Cold Heart (2003)
18. Therapy (2004)
19. Rage (2005)
20. Gone (2006)
21. Obsession (2007)
22. Compulsion (2008)
23. Bones (2008)
24. Evidence (2009)
25. Deception (2010)
26. Mystery (2011)
27. Victims (2012)
28. Guilt (2013)
29. Killer (2014)
30. Motive (2015)
31. Breakdown (2016)
32. Heartbreak Hotel (2017)
33. Night Moves (2018)
34. The Wedding Guest (2019)
35. The Museum of Desire (2020)
36. Serpentine (2021)
37. City of the Dead (2022)
38. Unnatural History (2023)
39. The Ghost Orchid (2024)
40. Open Season (2025)
41. Jigsaw (2026)

==== Related Novels ====
1. The Butcher's Theater (1988)
2. True Detectives (2009)

=== Petra Connor ===
1. Billy Straight (1998)
2. Twisted (2004)

=== Jacob Lev (with Jesse Kellerman) ===
1. The Golem of Hollywood (2014)
2. The Golem of Paris (2015)

=== Clay Edison (with Jesse Kellerman) ===
1. Crime Scene (2017)
2. A Measure of Darkness (2018)
3. Half Moon Bay (alternatively published as Lost Souls) (2020)
4. The Burning (2021)
5. The Lost Coast (2024)
6. Coyote Hills (2025)

=== Standalone novels ===
- The Conspiracy Club (2003)
- Double Homicide (2005) (with Faye Kellerman)
- Capital Crimes (2007) (with Faye Kellerman)
- The Murderer's Daughter (2015)

=== Omnibus ===
- Blood Test / When the Bough Breaks / Over the Edge (1990)
- Devil's Waltz / Bad Love (2003)

=== Nonfiction ===
- Psychological Aspects of Childhood Cancer (1980)
- Helping the Fearful Child (1981)
- Savage Spawn: Reflections on Violent Children (1999)
- The Best American Crime Reporting 2008 (2008) (with Thomas H. Cook and Otto Penzler)
- With Strings Attached: The Art and Beauty of Vintage Guitars (2008)
