= Cindy Monica Salsabila Setiawan =

Indonesian politician (born 1999)

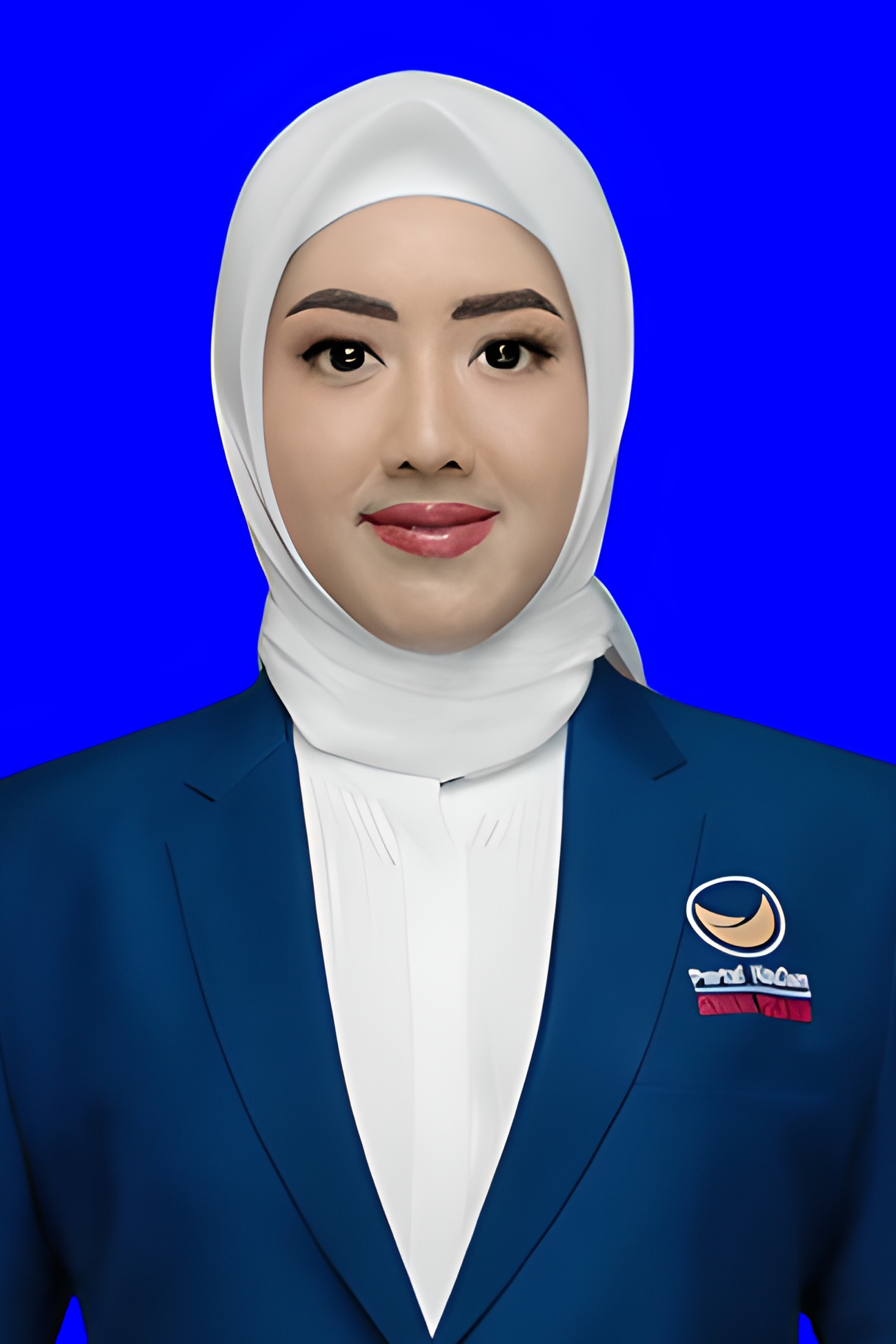
- Cindy Monica Salsabila Setiawan in 2023

Member of the House of Representatives
- Incumbent
- Assumed office 1 October 2024
- Constituency: West Sumatra II

Personal details
- Born: 29 November 1999 (age 26)
- Party: NasDem Party

Cindy Monica Salsabila Setiawan (born 29 November 1999) is an Indonesian politician serving as a member of the House of Representatives since 2024. She has served as treasurer of the NasDem Party in West Sumatra since 2022.
