= Milk and Honey (Kellerman novel) =

1990 novel by Faye Kellerman

- Author: Faye Kellerman
- Language: English
- Series: Peter Decker and Rina Lazarus
- Release number: 3
- Genre: Mystery
- Set in: Los Angeles
- Publisher: William Morrow and Company
- Publication date: 1990
- Publication place: United States
- Media type: Print
- Pages: 384
- ISBN: 0688086039
- OCLC: 779370804
- Preceded by: Sacred and Profane
- Followed by: Day of Atonement

Milk and Honey is a 1990 novel by Faye Kellerman, published by William Morrow and Company as part of the Peter Decker/Rina Lazarus series. It takes place about 18 months after Sacred and Profane, when Decker is 41, in Los Angeles, in the Foothill Division of the LAPD.

== Plot summary ==
Decker finds a toddler with blood-soaked pajamas in the early morning hours while driving home from the yeshiva. He brings her in to the station to turn her over to child services, and starts trying to locate her family. His only clue is a number of bee stings. Pete also finds himself posting bail for an old Army buddy of his (Abel Atwater), who had been charged with rape and assault. Abel offers to do repair work on his barn, while Pete is off locating the girl's family. In the meantime, Rina is flying in from New York City for a visit for some alone time and to discuss their upcoming marriage. While backtracking clues in the found toddler's case, he finds the family home is the site of a quadruple murder, and that her name is Katie Darcy. Decker has to slog through many peripheral clues in the case, including a biker bar and a backwoods section of Los Angeles County. His partner Marge Dunn ends up dealing further with one of Katie's potential parents, whose own child was kidnapped in a custody case. She remembered the face and succeeded in putting a name to it. In a raid on the father's house, she gets her skull cracked, and is lucky to come out of it alive. Meanwhile, Rina and Abel have found an odd sort of relationship based on Decker and his mutual past and Abel's bitterness over happenings during the war. He ends up frightening and offending her greatly, though she does forgive him in the end. In finding the murderer of Katie's family and clearing Abel's name, Decker finds an odd parallel in family circumstance.
