= Cyndy Brucato =

American journalist (born 1951)

- Born: August 13, 1951 (age 74); Chicago, Illinois
- Education: Northwestern University Medill School of Journalism
- Occupations: public relations officer, journalist, news anchor
- Years active: 1974 – present

Cyndy Brucato (born August 13, 1951) is a journalist, public relations consultant and former longtime Minneapolis-Saint Paul, Minnesota, news anchor. She was born and raised in Chicago, Illinois, and was educated there through graduate school at Northwestern University's Medill School of Journalism.

== Early broadcasting career ==
After getting her start at WDIO-TV in Duluth, Minnesota, in the mid-1970s, Brucato garnered respect in the late 1970s as a hard hitting, no-nonsense reporter at WCCO-TV in Minneapolis-St. Paul, followed by WBBM-TV in Chicago. Amid much fanfare, KSTP-TV brought her back to Minnesota in 1979 as a news co-anchor alongside Ron Magers. They were the Twin Cities' top-rated news team—an era unparalleled at the station. After Magers' departure in 1981, she was paired with Stan Turner for most of the next five years, with a short stint sitting next to Bob Vernon.

In 1986, Brucato sought a news anchor position in Boston. Although a move never transpired, KSTP management decided to pull Cyndy off-air for the months remaining on her contract. After her non-compete agreement with Channel 5 expired, she briefly moved to KARE in 1987. She gave featured reports under the heading 'Cyndy's Notebook'.

== Gubernatorial press secretary ==
From 1990 to 1996, Brucato served as Deputy Chief of Staff, Director of Communications and Press Secretary for Republican Minnesota Governor Arne Carlson. She also served as Director of Communications for the Minnesota Department of Transportation and as Communications Director for Republican Norm Coleman.

== Establishment of public relations firm ==
During the next eight years, Brucato was president and Chief Consultant of Brucato & Halliday Ltd., a Minnesota-based public relations company. Her business was certified by the Women's Business Enterprise National Council, the nation's leading advocate of women-owned businesses.

== Return to KSTP and aftermath ==
In 2004, after an 18-year absence from the station, Brucato made a surprise return to the KSTP-TV anchor desk. Her comeback had been preceded by a guest appearance as a fill-in sportscaster, at Sports Director Joe Schmit's request. Management then decided to rehire her for a news anchor position.

During her first year back at Channel 5, Brucato anchored the 10:00 p.m. news until a new main anchor team was in place. She remained on the KSTP 6:30 news anchor desk until September 2010. During her tenure, she received a Peabody Award and a national Emmy, and was inducted into the Minnesota Broadcasting Hall of Fame.

While Brucato's return to KSTP only caused an initial bump in the ratings, her greater significance was to add insight and depth to the news desk, which has many newer personalities in the market. She also expressed public support for the Hubbard family.

Brucato is currently a featured political reporter for MinnPost.com. and is the host of Greater MSP Business, a weekly business program which aired on KSTP-TV from 2012 until 2015 when due to low ratings, it was pulled from KSTP's schedule and moved to online exclusively.
