= Faye Kellerman =

American novelist (born 1952)

- Born: July 31, 1952 (age 74); St. Louis, Missouri, U.S.
- Education: University of California, Los Angeles (BA; Doctor of Dental Surgery)
- Occupation: Author
- Spouse: Jonathan Kellerman
- Children: 4, including Jesse
- Writing career
- Language: English
- Genre: Mystery
- Notable works: Peter Decker and Rina Lazarus novels

Faye Marder Kellerman (born July 31, 1952) is an American writer of mystery novels, in particular the "Peter Decker/Rina Lazarus" series, as well as three nonseries books, The Quality of Mercy, Moon Music, and Straight into Darkness.

== Early life ==
Kellerman was born on July 31, 1952, in St. Louis, Missouri. She attended UCLA, where she earned a Bachelor of Arts in mathematics in 1974. In 1978, she received her doctorate of dental surgery, but she has never practiced dentistry and was a housewife before publishing her first novel. In a 1997 essay, she says she cannot pinpoint the metamorphosis from dentist to writer of detective fiction, but several factors that steered her toward mystery writing were: "a desire for justice, a suspicious nature, an overactive imagination, and of course, a penchant for the bizarre."

== Personal life ==
Kellerman is a practicing Orthodox Jew, as are her husband and son, novelists Jonathan Kellerman and Jesse Kellerman, respectively. Her writing frequently deals with Jewish themes and characters, incorporating them into the framework of the traditional mystery. The Peter Decker books, for example, center on a police detective raised as a Southern Baptist, who returns to his Jewish roots after falling in love with Rina Lazarus, an Orthodox Jew, while investigating a rape that took place near a yeshiva.

The Kellermans are the only married couple ever to appear on the New York Times bestseller list simultaneously (for two different books). They have four children. Their youngest child, Aliza Kellerman, co-wrote Prism (2009), a young adult novel, with her mother.

== Plagiarism lawsuit ==
In 1999, Kellerman sued the writers of the 1998 film Shakespeare in Love, who she claimed stole the plotline from her 1989 novel The Quality of Mercy, in which Shakespeare romances a Jewish woman who dresses as a man, and attempts to solve a murder. Miramax Films spokesman Andrew Stengel derided the claim, filed in the US District Court six days before the 1999 Academy Awards, as "absurd", and argued that the timing "suggests a publicity stunt". An out-of-court settlement was reached.

== Bibliography ==
=== The Peter Decker and Rina Lazarus series ===
1. The Ritual Bath (1986) (Winner of the 1987 Macavity award for Best First Novel, nominated for the 1987 Anthony Award in the same category)
2. Sacred and Profane (1987)
3. Milk and Honey (1990)
4. Day of Atonement (1991)
5. False Prophet (1992)
6. Grievous Sin (1993)
7. Sanctuary (1994)
8. Justice (1995)
9. Prayers for the Dead (1996)
10. Serpent's Tooth (1997)
11. Jupiter's Bones (1999)
12. Stalker (2000)
13. The Forgotten (2001)
14. Stone Kiss (2002)
15. Street Dreams (2003)
16. The Burnt House (2007)
17. The Mercedes Coffin aka Cold Case (2008)
18. Blindman's Bluff (2009)
19. Hangman (2010)
20. Gun Games (2011) aka Blood Games (2012)
21. The Beast aka Predator (2013)
22. Murder 101 (2014)
23. The Theory of Death (2015)
24. Bone Box (2017)
25. Walking Shadows (2018)
26. The Lost Boys (2021)
27. The Hunt (2022)

=== Other novels ===
- The Quality of Mercy (1989)
- Moon Music (1998)
- Double Homicide (2004) – written with Jonathan Kellerman
- Straight Into Darkness (2005)
- The Garden of Eden and Other Criminal Delights (2006)
- Capital Crimes (2006) – written with Jonathan Kellerman
- Prism (2009) – written with Aliza Kellerman
- Killing Season (2017)

(Source: Bookreporter.com – Author Bibliography – Faye Kellerman Bibliography)
