= Richard Masur =

American actor (born 1948)

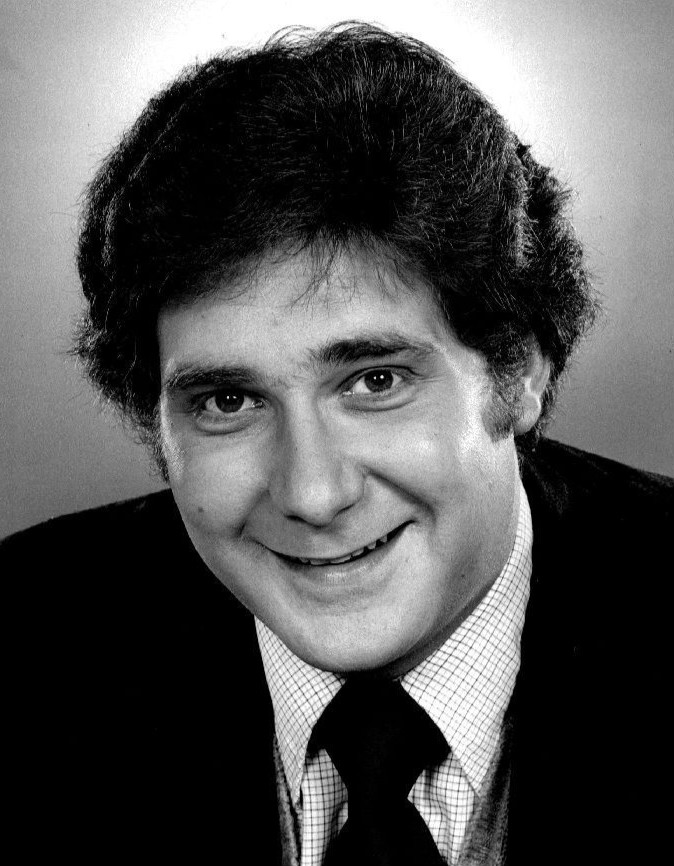
- Masur in One Day at a Time, 1975
- Born: November 20, 1948 (age 77); New York City, U.S.
- Education: Yale University
- Occupation: Actor
- Years active: 1974–present
- Spouses: Fredda Weiss (m. 1976; div. 2004) Eileen Henry (m. 2004)

President of the Screen Actors Guild
- In office July 11, 1995 – March 5, 1999
- Preceded by: Barry Gordon
- Succeeded by: William Daniels

Richard Masur (born November 20, 1948) is an American character actor who has appeared in more than 40 films. From 1995 to 1999, he served two terms as president of the Screen Actors Guild (SAG). He is best known for playing David Kane on One Day at a Time (1975–1976), Nick Lobo on Rhoda (1974–1977), Clark in The Thing (1982), adult Stanley Uris in the miniseries It (1990), and Edward L. L. Moore on Younger (2016–2018).

== Life and career ==
Masur was born in New York City to Jewish parents: a high school counselor mother, Claire Masur, and a pharmacist father, Jesse Masur. He has a sister, Judith Masur. He attended P.S. 28, Walt Whitman Junior High School, and Roosevelt High School, Yonkers, New York. He is married to Eileen Henry.

Masur studied at the Yale School of Drama toward an MFA in acting and appeared on stage before acting in movies and television shows during the 1970s. He appeared on an episode of All in the Family as well as in an episode of The Waltons in 1974, and had recurring roles in Rhoda from 1974 to 1977; One Day at a Time from 1975 to 1976; Hot l Baltimore in 1975; and the pilot to an NBC sitcom, Bumpers, in 1977. In 1981, Masur played the role of a child molester armed with a camera in the television film Fallen Angel. His next project was the 1982 horror/sci-fi movie The Thing as the dog handler Clark.

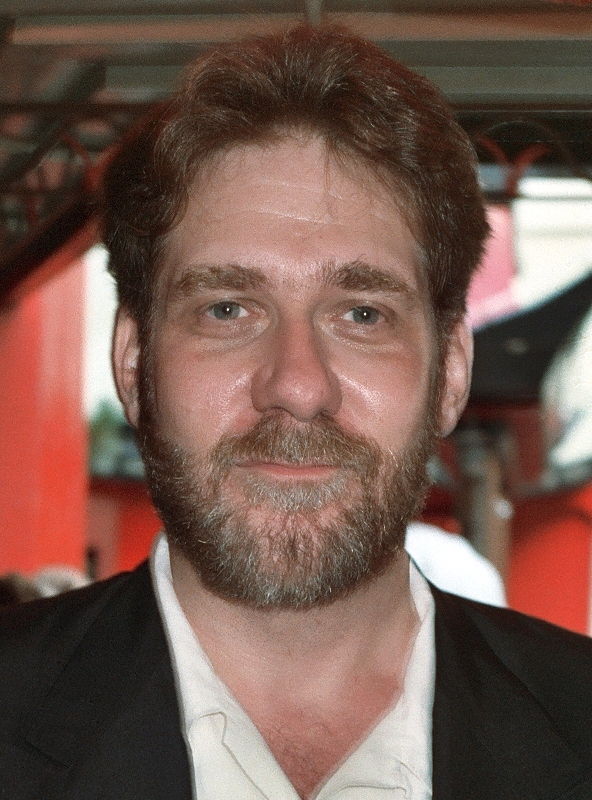
Richard Masur in 1990

Masur played the father to Corey Haim's character in 1988's License to Drive and was part of the ensemble cast of the 1990 TV miniseries adaptation of Stephen King's It.

Masur played the role of a character modeled after Jewish American spy Jonathan Pollard in the film Les Patriotes (The Patriots) (1994), by French director Éric Rochant.

In January 2006, Masur began appearing as a recurring character on the soap opera All My Children. He has also appeared in guest spots on many TV shows, including M*A*S*H, The Mary Tyler Moore Show, Hawaii Five-O, Happy Days, Picket Fences, Matlock, Murphy Brown, Law & Order, Kevin (Probably) Saves the World, All in the Family, Rhoda, One Day at a Time, and Transparent.

In December 2009, Masur played the role of Martin Stone in the off-Broadway play Dust.

== Filmography ==
=== Film ===
Year	Title	Role	Notes
1975	Whiffs	Lockyer's aide	
1976	Bittersweet Love	Alex	
1977	Semi-Tough	Phillip Hooper	
1978	Who'll Stop the Rain	Danskin	
1979	Hanover Street	2nd Lieut. Jerry Cimino	
1979	Scavenger Hunt	Georgie Carruthers	
1980	Heaven's Gate	Cully	
1982	I'm Dancing as Fast as I Can	Alan Newman	
1982	The Thing	Clark	
1982	Timerider: The Adventure of Lyle Swann	Claude Dorsett	
1983	Risky Business	Rutherford	
1983	Nightmares	Steven Houston	Segment: "Night of the Rat"
1983	Under Fire	Hub Kittle	
1985	The Falcon and the Snowman	Bartender	Uncredited
1985	The Mean Season	Bill Nolan	
1985	My Science Project	Detective Isadore Nulty	
1985	Head Office	Max Landsberger	
1986	Heartburn	Arthur	
1987	The Believers	Marty Wertheimer	
1987	Rent-a-Cop	Roger Latrele	
1987	Walker	Ephraim Squier	
1988	Shoot to Kill	Norman	
1988	License to Drive	Mr. Anderson	
1989	Far From Home	Duckett	
1990	Flashback	Barry	
1991	Going Under	Defense Contractor	
1991	My Girl	Phil Sultenfuss	
1992	Encino Man	Mr. Morgan	
1993	The Man Without a Face	Prof. Carl Hartley	
1993	Blood In Blood Out	Jerry (Prison Librarian)	
1993	Six Degrees of Separation	Dr. Fine	
1994	My Girl 2	Phil Sultenfuss	
1994	The Patriots	Jeremy Pelman	
1995	Forget Paris	Craig	
1996	Multiplicity	Del King	
1997	Fire Down Below	Phil Pratt	
1999	Play It to the Bone	Artie	
2004	Palindromes	Steve Victor	
2007	Lovely by Surprise	Dave	
2015	Tumbledown	Bruce	
2016	Don't Think Twice	Lou	
2021	Pennywise: The Story of It	Himself	Documentary film
2026	The Thing Expanded	Himself	Documentary film

=== Television ===
Year	Title	Role	Notes
1974	All in the Family	George Bushmill	Episode: "Gloria's Boyfriend" (title guest role)
1974	The Mary Tyler Moore Show	Bob Larson	Episode: "The Outsider"
1974	The Waltons	Tom Povich	Episode: "The System"
1974–1977	Rhoda	Nick Lobo	7 episodes
1975	Hawaii Five-O	Bink Avery	Season 8, Episode 14: "A Touch of Guilt"
1975	Hot l Baltimore	Clifford Ainsley	Main cast
1975–1976, 1981	One Day at a Time	David Kane	Main cast (seasons 1–2), guest appearance (season 6)
1975	M*A*S*H	Lt 'Digger' Detmuller	Episode: "The Late Captain Pierce"
1979	Mr. Horn	Sheriff Ed Smalley	TV movie
1980	Happy Days	Doug	Episode: "Allison"
1981	East of Eden	Will Hamilton	TV miniseries
1981	Fallen Angel	Howard Nichols	TV movie
1982	Cagney & Lacey	Ralph Barbinski	Episode: "I'll Be Home for Christmas"
1983	The Demon Murder Case	Anthony Marino	TV movie
1983	Adam	Jay Howell	TV movie
1983	The Winter of Our Discontent	Danny	TV movie
1984	Flight 90: Disaster on the Potomac	Roger Olian	TV movie
1984	The Burning Bed	Aryon Greydanus	TV movie
1985	Amazing Stories	Trent Tinker	Episode: "The Amazing Falsworth"
1986	Mr. Boogedy	Carleton Davis	2 episodes
1986	Adam: His Song Continues	Jay Howell	TV movie
1986	When the Bough Breaks	Milo Sturgis	TV movie
1988	Thirtysomething	Werner Breslow	Episode: "Competition"
1988	L.A. Law	Robert Boland	Episode: "Open Heart Perjury"
1988	Hiroshima Maiden	Jim Bennett	TV movie
1989	Third Degree Burn	Clay Reynolds	TV movie
1990	The Great Los Angeles Earthquake	Kevin Conrad	TV movie
1990	Murphy Brown	Ben	Episode: "Fax or Fiction"
1990	Blossom	Terry Russo	Episode: "Pilot"
1990	Lifestories	Don Chapin	Episode: "Don Chapin"
1990	It	Stanley Uris	Miniseries, main cast
1990	Matlock	David O'Malley	Episode(s) The Informer Part I and II
1990	Always Remember I Love You	Earl Monroe	TV movie
1991	The Story Lady	Norm Denton	TV movie
1993	And the Band Played On	William W. Darrow, Ph.D.	TV movie
1993	L.A. Law	Barry Glassman / Jay Ellison	3 episodes
1994–1995	Picket Fences	Ed Lawson	6 episodes
1995	The Face on the Milk Carton	Jonathan Sands	TV movie
1995	It Was Him or Us	Walter Pomeroy	TV movie
1995	Dream On	Manny	Episode: "Am I Blue"
1996	Undue Influence	Jack Vega	TV movie
1998	Significant Others	Leonard Chasin	3 episodes
1998	The Practice	A.D.A. Ed Means	Episode: "Ties That Bind"
1999	Law & Order	Judge Andrew Wolinsky	Episode: "Justice"
1999-2000	Family Law	Judge Thomas Armstrong	4 episodes
2001	61*	Milt Kahn	TV movie
2001	Felicity	Dr. Auerbach	2 episodes
2002	The Practice	Dr. Daniel Taylor	Episode: "M. Premie Unplugged"
2008	Law & Order: Special Victims Unit	Dr. Berletch	Episode: "Inconceivable"
2010-2011	Bored to Death	Ira Ames	3 episodes
2012	Girls	Rich Glatter	2 episodes
2013	Elementary	Jacob Weiss	Episode: "Internal Audit"
2015–2016	The Good Wife	Geoffrey Solomon	3 episodes
2015–2016	Transparent	Buzzy Rackless	Recurring role (seasons 2–3)
2015–2016	Orange Is the New Black	Bill Montgomery	5 episodes
2015, 2017	Red Oaks	Morrie	3 episodes
2016, 2018	Younger	Edward L.L. Moore	4 episodes
2023	Kaleidoscope	Dr. Wagner	Episode: "Green: 7 Years Before the Heist"
2023	The Equalizer	Rabbi Altman	Episode: "Never Again"

=== Stage ===
Year	Title	Role	Notes
1969	The Caucasian Chalk Circle	Grand Duke	Williamstown Theatre Festival
1969	Ring Round the Moon	A General	Williamstown Theatre Festival
1969	The Threepenny Opera	Walt Dreary	Williamstown Theatre Festival
1969	We Bombed in New Haven	Two Sportsmen	Williamstown Theatre Festival
1970	The Magistrate	Constable Harris	Williamstown Theatre Festival
1970	Operation: Sidewinder	Spider Lady	Williamstown Theatre Festival
1970	Guys and Dolls	Calvin	Williamstown Theatre Festival
1970	The Revenger's Tragedy	Keeper	Yale Repertory Theatre
1971	Mother Courage	Swiss Cheese	Williamstown Theatre Festival
1971	Macbeth	1st Murderer	Yale Repertory Theatre
1972	The Resistible Rise of Arturo Ui	Emanuele Giri	Williamstown Theatre Festival
1972	Peer Gynt	Ensemble	Williamstown Theatre Festival
1972	What Price Glory?	Soldier	Long Wharf Theatre
1972	Once in a Lifetime	Bishop	Williamstown Theatre Festival
1972	Uncle Vanya	Telygin	Williamstown Theatre Festival
1973	Troilus and Cressida	Ajax	Lincoln Center Theatre, Off-Broadway
1973	The Changing Room	Jack Stringer	Morosco Theatre, Broadway
2004	Sarah, Sarah	Vincent/Arthur Grosberg	Manhattan Theatre Club, Off-Broadway
2004	Democracy	Horst Ehmke	Brooks Atkinson Theatre, Broadway
2005	The Ruby Sunrise	Martin Marcus	Astor Place Theatre, Off-Broadway
2007	A Feminine Ending	David	Playwrights Horizons, Off-Broadway
2008	Two Thousand Years	Danny	Acorn Theater, Off-Broadway
2008	Dust	Martin Stone	Westside Theatre, Off-Broadway
2009	Make Me	Phil	Atlantic Theater Company, Off-Broadway
2009	The Oldsmobiles	Mr. Oldsmobile	The Flea Theater, Off-Broadway
2011	Olive and the Bitter Herbs	Sylvan	59E59 Theater, Off-Broadway
2013	Lucky Guy	Jerry Nachman/Stanley Joyce	Broadhurst Theatre, Broadway
2013	Fetch Clay, Make Man	William Fox	New York Theatre Workshop, Off-Broadway
2018	Relevance	David	Lucille Lortel Theatre, Off-Broadway
2018	The Net Will Appear	Bernard	59E59 Theater, Off-Broadway
2024	Prayer for the French Republic	Pierre	Samuel J. Friedman Theatre, Broadway
2022	Two Jews Talking	Bud/Phil	The New Group, Off-Broadway
2024	Dirty Laundry	My Dad	WP Theater, Off-Broadway
