= List of most popular given names =

Common given names by continent

The most popular given names vary nationally, regionally, culturally, and over time. Lists of widely used given names can consist of those most often bestowed upon infants born within the last year, thus reflecting the current naming trends, or else be composed of the personal names occurring most often within the total population.

== Popularity by region ==
The names listed in the following tables, unless otherwise noted, represent the most current top 10 breakdowns of what newborn children are commonly being named in the various regions of the world.

=== Africa ===
==== Male names ====
Region (year)	No. 1	No. 2	No. 3	No. 4	No. 5	No. 6	No. 7	No. 8	No. 9	No. 10
Algeria (census, 2010)	Mohamed	Abdelkader	Ahmed	Mohammed	Ali	Rachid	Said	Ibrahim	Omar	Djamel
Egypt (2004, unofficial)	Mohamed	Youssef	Ahmed	Mahmoud	Mustafa	Yassin	Taha	Khaled	Hamza	Bilal
Egypt (2004, Coptic Christians, unofficial)	Peter	Pierre	George	John	Mina	Beshoi	Kirollos	Mark	Fadi	Habib
Equatorial Guinea (2011)	Manuel	Juan	Antonio	José						
Ethiopia (total population)	Mohammed	Ali	Mohamed	Solomon	Abdela	Daniel	Mehamed	Kemal	Ebrahim	Michael
Liberia (unofficial)	James	Emmanuel	John	Joseph	Moses	Prince	Junior	Abraham	Samuel	Peter
Libya	Mohammed	Ahmed	Ali	Hamza	Ibrahim	Mahmoud	Abdallah	Tareq	Hassan	Khaled
Mali (census, 2010)	Mamadou	Moussa	Mahamadou	Adama	Bakary	Abdoulaye	Modibo	Oumar	Sekou	Souleymane
Morocco (2019)	Mohamed	Amir	Ibrahim	Naïm	Ayoub	Youssef	Younès	Wassim	Ali	Amine
Nigeria (unofficial)	Musa	Ibrahim	Abubakar	Sani	Mohammed	Sunday	Umar	Emmanuel	Usman	Muhammed
Senegal (unofficial)	Mamadou	Ibrahima	Cheikh	Abdoulaye	Amadou	Moussa	Ousmane	Modou	Abdou	Aliou
Sierra Leone (unofficial)	Mohamed	Ibrahim	Abdul	John	Joseph	Samuel	James	David	Abu	Emmanuel
Somalia (unofficial)	Mohamed	Abdi	Ahmed	Ali	Hassan	Farah	Ibrahim	Mahamed	Omar	Hussein
South Africa(2024)	Lethabo	Lubanzi	Nkazimulo	Nkanyezi	Langelihle	Lesedi	Lethokuhle	Siphosethu	Junior	Leano
Sudan (2017, unofficial)	Mustafa	Okot	Ibrahim	Fahim	Jamal	Abdo	Samir	Mohamad	Suleyman	Asim
Tunisia (2022)	Youssef	Haroun	Yahya	Adam	Mohamed	Ahmed	Zakaria	Yaakoub	Yassine	Sajed

=== Female names ===
Region (year)	No. 1	No. 2	No. 3	No. 4	No. 5	No. 6	No. 7	No. 8	No. 9	No. 10
Algeria (census, 2020)	Imene	Sara	Yasmine	Lyna	Maria	Amina	Meriem	Karima	Melissa	Lydia
Ivory Coast (unofficial)	Ahou	Akissi	Aya	Amoin	Affoue	Lou	Adjoua	Amenan	Brou	Mariam
Egypt (2004, unofficial)	Shaimaa	Fatma	Maha, Reem	Farida	Aya	Shahd	Ashraqat	Sahar	Fatin	Dalal
Egypt (2004, Coptic Christians, unofficial)	Mary, Marie, Mariam	Marina	Irene	Malak	Habiba	Hana	Farah	Marwa	Nada	Salma
Equatorial Guinea (2011)	María del Carmen	Isabel	María Teresa	Esperanza	Milagrosa					
Ethiopia (total population)	Daba	Fanta	Sima	Aman	Araya	Berta	Marie	Rahel	Nida	Jean
Guinea-Bissau (unofficial)	Adama	Aninha	Domingas	Edna	Glória	Felismina	Joaquina	Mariana	Zulmira	Vitória
Guinea (unofficial)	Fatoumata	Mariama	Kadiatou	Aissatou	Aminata	Fanta	Mariame	Oumou	Marie	Hadja
Liberia (unofficial)	Mary	Esther	Hawa	Annie	Martha	Mamie	Oretha	Sarah	Rebecca	Patience
Libya	Aya	Rania	Sarah	Reem	Hoda	Marwa	Mona	Fatima	Eisha	Nesreen
Mali (census, 2010)	Fatoumata	Mariam	Aminata	Hawa	Awa	Oumou	Djeneba	Bintou	Fanta	Kadiatou
Morocco (2019)	Inès	Noûr	Aya	Yasmine	Assia	Maryam	Aïcha	Nora	Amira	Amina
Nigeria (unofficial)	Blessing	Aisha	Fatima	Mary	Esther	Grace	Amina	Zainab	Maryam	Joy
Senegal (total population)	Fatou	Ndeye	Awa	Khady	Aminata	Aïssatou	Coumba	Adama	Mariama	Amy
Sierra Leone (unofficial)	Francis	Victoria	Aminata	Mariama	Amara	Elizabeth	Zainab	Josephine	Christiana	Esther
Somalia (unofficial)	Maryan	Amina	Halima	Asha	Hawa	Sahra	Mariam	Khadija	Zahra	Habiba
South Africa (2024)	Onalerona	Zanokuhle	Melokuhle	Lisakhanya	Lethabo	Nkanyezi	Onthatile	Lesedi	Omphile	Olwemihla
Sudan (unofficial)	Fatima	Mariam	Sara	Huda	Layla	Noor	Yasmin	Samira	Iman	Ameera
Tunisia (2022)	Mariem	Rayhane	Lina	Mayar	Essil	Beya	Soujoud	Jouri	Yasmine	Eline

=== Americas ===
==== Male names ====
Region (year)	No. 1	No. 2	No. 3	No. 4	No. 5	No. 6	No. 7	No. 8	No. 9	No. 10
Argentina (Buenos Aires, 2024)	Mateo	Felipe	Enzo	Bautista	Benjamín	Bruno	Liam	Joaquín	Noah	Benicio
Argentina (Córdoba, 2024)	Benjamín	Bautista	Mateo	Valentino	Gael	Valentín	Noah	Lorenzo	Liam	Benicio
Aruba (2005)	Daniel	Dylan	Kevin/Keven							
Bolivia (2024)	Santiago	Maximiliano	Agustín	Caleb	Enzo	Gael	Leonardo	Liam	Thiago	Dylan
Brazil (2025)	Ravi	Miguel	Heitor	Artur	Théo	Gael	Bernardo	Davi	Noah	Samuel
Brazil (census, 2010)	José	João	Antônio	Francisco	Carlos	Paulo	Pedro	Lucas	Luiz	Marcos
Canada (2025)	Noah	Theodore	Liam	Leo	William	Oliver	Jack	Benjamin	Thomas	Lucas
Canada (Quebec, 2025)	Noah	Léo	Liam	Arthur	Louis	William	Édouard	Thomas	Théo	Adam
Chile (2025)	Mateo	Liam	Lucas	Santiago	Facundo	Thiago	Benjamín	Gael, Máximo	Gaspar	NA
Colombia (2024)	Mateo	Liam	Lucas	Santiago	Gaspar	Facundo	Thiago	Benjamín	Vicente	Gael
Costa Rica (2024)	Santiago	Mateo	Samuel	Julián	Emiliano	Noah	Sebastián	Nicolás	Thiago	Felipe
Cuba	José Luis	Jorge Luis	Ernesto	Roberto	Jorge	Eduardo	José Antonio	Raúl	Alejandro	Manuel
Dominican Republic (2023)	Adriel	Emmanuel	Sebastián	Alexander	Liam	Gael	Daniel	David	Jayden	Dariel
Ecuador (Baby Center, 2024)	Benjamín	Gael	Ider	Samuel	Thiago	Emiliano	Lucas	Noah	Santiago	NA
El Salvador (Baby Center, 2024)	Mateo	Lucas	Oliver	Santiago	Thiago	Aarón	Carlo	Liam	Sebastián	Ángel
Greenland (2012–2020)	Inuk	Malik	Minik	Inunnguag, Liam, Ulloriaq	Norsaq	Aputsiaq	Ivik	Miki	Maligiaq, Noah, Qillaq	Inutsiaq, Nuka, Salik
Guatemala (2024)	Liam	Luis	Thiago	David	Santiago	Eithan	Matías	Ethan	Julián	Mateo
Haiti (unofficial)	Jean	Louis	Pierre	Baptiste	Junior	Joseph	Emmanuel	James	Marc	Jacques
Honduras (Baby Center, 2024)	Liam	Isaac	Mateo	Aylam	Roberto	Samuel	Adrian	Cristhian	Daniel	Dylan
Jamaica (2021)	Aiden	Liam	Malachi	Amir	Nathaniel	Joshua	Josiah	Zahir	Nathan	NA
Mexico (2024, unofficial)	Mateo	Santiago	Maximiliano	Oliver	Diego	Leonardo	Iker	Sebastián	Enzo	Juan Pablo
Nicaragua (2024, Baby Center)	Santiago	Adrián	Alejandro	Andrew	Eddy	Liam	Salatiel	Benjamín	Caleb	David
Panama (2024, Baby Center)	Aminadab	Thiago	Aibar	David	Eider	Endrick	Enoc	Gael	Ian	Jatniel
Paraguay (2024, Baby Center)	Thiago	Benjamín	Mateo	Liam	Juan	Rafael	Agustín	Alejandro	Bruno	Dante
Peru (2024, Baby Center)	Mateo	Eithan	Santiago	Liam	Thiago	Enzo	Gabriel	Noah	Adriel	Alejandro
Puerto Rico (2025)	Noah	Liam	Thiago	Mateo	Sebastián	Elian	Dylan, Lucas	Ethan	Eliam	Ian
United States (2025)	Liam	Noah	Oliver	Theodore	Henry	James	Elijah	Mateo	William	Lucas
United States (census, 1990)	James	John	Robert	Michael	William	David	Richard	Charles	Joseph	Thomas
Uruguay (2025)	Juan	Mateo	José	Liam	Felipe	Benjamín	Lorenzo	Luis	Thiago	Noah
Venezuela (2024, Baby Center)	Noah	Liam	Mateo, Matheo, Matteo	Thiago	Luciano	Mathias	Eithan	Maximiliano	Santiago	Marcelo

==== Female names ====
Region (year)	No. 1	No. 2	No. 3	No. 4	No. 5	No. 6	No. 7	No. 8	No. 9	No. 10
Buenos Aires, Argentina (2024)	Olivia	Sofía	Emma	Emilia	Isabella	Catalina	Martina	Delfina	Alma	Valentina
Córdoba, Argentina (2024)	Isabella	Catalina	Valentina	Emma	Emilia	Victoria	Olivia	Martina	Cataleya	Mía
Aruba (2005)	Alysha	Isabella/Isabelle	Emily/Emely	NA	NA	NA	NA	NA	NA	NA
Bolivia (2024, Baby Center	Aitana	Valentina	Danae	Renata	Antonella	Alexia	Alicia	Amira	Ariana	Aurora
Brazil (2025)	Helena	Maitê	Cecília	Maria Cecília	Aurora	Alice	Laura	Antonella	Isis	Heloísa
Brazil (census, 2010)	Maria	Ana	Francisca	Antônia	Adriana	Juliana	Marcia	Fernanda	Patrícia	Aline
Canada (2025)	Charlotte	Olivia	Emma	Sophia	Amelia	Sofia	Chloe	Mia	Lily	Nora
Canada, Quebec (2025)	Emma	Charlotte	Olivia	Alice	Florence	Sofia	Juliette	Beatrice	Charlie	Romy
Chile (2025)	Emma	Emilia	Sofía, Isabella	Julieta	Aurora	Mía	Isidora	Trinidad	Amanda	NA
Colombia (2024)	Emma	Isabella	Sofía	Emilia	Julieta	Mía	Isidora	Aurora	Trinidad	Antonella
Costa Rica (2024)	Isabella	Antonella	Luciana	Valentina	Sara	Emma	Camila	Lucía	Zoé	Victoria
Cuba	Yanet	María Carmen	Mercedes	Caridad	María Elena	Tania	Elizabeth	Ana María	Odalys	Yadira
Dominican Republic (2023)	Abigail	Alaia	Valentina	Esther	Elianny	Ashley	Charlotte	Camila	Zoe	Emma
Ecuador (Baby Center, 2024)	Amelia	Antonella	Isabella	Luciana	Amira	Emma	Mia	Valentina	Victoria	Aitana
El Salvador (Baby Center, 2024)	Sofía	Antonella	Isabella	Arleth	Elena	Elianny	Elizabeth	Emily	Fiorella	Julimar
Greenland (2012–2020)	Ivaana	Nivi	Uiloq	Niviaq	Isabella	Ivalu, Pipaluk	Malu	Paninnguaq	Aviana, Maya	Paneeraq
Guatemala (2024)	Valentina	Sofía	Emma	Isabella	Marian	Alejandra	Astrid	Camila	Luciana	Meredith
Haiti (total population, most common names, unofficial)	Marie	Rose	Stephanie	Nadège	Natacha	Fabienne	Nathalie	Roseline	Jacqueline	Marjorie
Honduras (Baby Center, 2024)	Isabella	Dara	Valentina	Emma	Kassandra	Aitana	Ámbar	Ariadna	Camila	Cristel
Jamaica (2021)	Amelia	Arianna	Gianna	Kyra	Azora Kiara	Azariah	Aria	Ariana	Azaria	NA
Mexico (2024,unofficial)	Mía	Emilia	Valentina	María Fernanda	Camila	Alexa	Isabella	Victoria	Renata	Valeria
Nicaragua (2024, Baby Center)	Elizabeth	Antonella	Anieli	Maddie	Abril	Ailany	Alessandra	Alice	Barbara	NA
Panama (2024, Baby Center)	Zoe	Alaia, Alahia	Sofía	Ana	Cailín	Elianys	Hannah	Isabella	Ivanna	Miranda
Paraguay (2024, Baby Center)	Isabella	Sofía	Luciana	Luana	Aitana	Danna	Allison	Emily	Milagros	Maia
Peru (2024, Baby Center)	Aitana	Valentina	Alessia	Zoe	Isabella	Antonella	Emma	Alaia	Almudena	Bianca
Puerto Rico (2025)	Aurora	Valentina	Mia	Emma	Catalina, Isabella	Amira	Milena	Amelia	Ainara, Gianna	Antonella
United States (2025)	Olivia	Charlotte	Emma	Amelia	Sophia	Mia	Isabella	Evelyn	Sofia	Eliana
United States (most common names, 1990 census)	Mary	Patricia	Linda	Barbara	Elizabeth	Jennifer	Maria	Susan	Margaret	Dorothy
Uruguay (2025)	María	Emma	Sofía	Olivia	Isabella	Julieta	Emilia	Martina	Zoé	Mía
Venezuela (2024, Baby Center)	Emma	Isabella	Abby	Amanda	Amelia	Ana Paula	Mia Isabella	Miranda	Salomé	Sofía, Sophia

=== Asia ===
==== Male names ====
Region (year)	No. 1	No. 2	No. 3	No. 4	No. 5	No. 6	No. 7	No. 8	No. 9	No. 10
Arab world (2021)	Mohamed محمد	Abdullah عبدالله	Ahmed أحمد	Ali علي	Yousouf يوسف	Omar عمر	Adam آدم	Abd عبد	Khaled خالد	Fahd فهد
Armenia (2025, babies born)	Davit	Narek	Hayk	Robert	Mik’ayel	Mark	Mont’e	Areg	Tigran	Leo
Armenia (general population, 2020)	Armen	Artur	Karen	Samvel	Gevorg	Ashot	Davit	Arman	Hovhannes	Gagik
Azerbaijan (2025)	Uğur	Raul	Huseyn (Hüseyn)	Ali (Əli)	Yusif	Miran	Omar (Ömər)	Aykhan (Ayxan)	Tunar	Murad
Azerbaijan (general population as of 2010)	Ali	Elchin	Vugar	Anar	Elnur	Samir	Elshan	Rashad	Ilgar	Vusal
Bahrain (total population)	Omar	Abdul	Osama	Nabeel	Muhammad	Ammar	Mohammad	Hani	Hisham	Saeed
Bangladesh (2020-2023)	Arif	Farhan	Sami	Asif	Ayaan	Omar	Zidan	Rahim	Salman	Imran
Bangladesh (total population)	Mohammed	Mohammad	Abdul	Muhammad	Abdullah	Ahmed	Syed	Kazi	Sheikh	Hasan
Bhutan (total population)	Nima	Som	Ram	Lal	Hari	Prem	Kamal	Kumar	Raj	Mangal
Brunei (total population)	Haji	Mohammad	Mohamed	Muhammad	Abdul	Yong	Mohamad	Nurul	Ahmad	Lau
Cambodia (total population)	Sam	Khan	Heng	Ron	Ryan	Dani	Da	Long	Di	Song
China (most popular names for children in recent years)	Yìchén (奕辰)	Yǔxuān (宇轩)	Hàoyǔ (浩宇)	Yìchén (亦辰)	Yǔchén (宇辰)	Zǐmò (子墨)	Yǔháng (宇航)	Hàorán (浩然)	Zǐháo (梓豪)	Yìchén (亦宸)
India	Shivansh	Dhruv	Kabir	Vedant	Kiaan	Aarav	Arjun	Viraj	Krishna	Avyan
India (most common names, unofficial)	Ram	Mohammed	Santosh	Sanjay	Sunil	Rajesh	Ramesh	Ashok	Manoj	Anil
Indonesia (general population as of 2023, including mononyms)	Sutrisno	Slamet	Mulyadi	Herman	Supardi	Ismail	Suprianto	Suparman	Junaidi	Wahyudi
Indonesia (2024, babies born)	Muhammad Al Fatih	Muhammad Arsya Alfarizoi	Muhammad Razka Raffasya	Muhammad Rayyan Alfarizoi	Muhammad Rayyan	Muhammad Attaqi Rafandra	Muhammad Arsya Alfarizqi	Kenzie Alvaro Devanka	Muhammad Raffasya Elvano	Muhammad Alfatih
Iran (2019)	Amir-Ali	Mohammad	Ali	Amir-Hossein	Hossein	AbulFazl	Amir-Abbas	Samyar	Mohammad-Taha	Aria
Iran (general population)	Mohammad	Ali	Hossein	Mahdi	Hassan	Reza	Ahmad	Mohammad-Reza	Abbas	Ali-Reza
Iraq (2007)	Ali	Muhammed	Hussein	Hydar	Ahmed	Omar	Hasan	Kathem	Abdullah	Ammar
Israel, (2025), newborn boys, total population	Muhammad	Yosef, Yusef	Adam	Ariel	David	Ariel	Lavi	Omar	Eitan	Michael
Israel, (2025), Jewish boys	Ariel אריאל	Lavi לביא	David דוד	Raphael רפאל	Uri אורי	Michael מיכאל	Eitan איתן	Elia אליה	Yehuda יהודה	Ari ארי
Israel, (2024), Muslim boys	Muhammad	Yusef	Ahmad	Adam	Omer	Ali	Abd	Amir	Ibrahim	Mahmoud
Israel, (2020), Christian Arab boys	Charbel	Jude	Niel	Elias	Liam	George	NA	NA	NA	NA
Israel, (2020), Druze boys	Adam	Taim	Niel	Amir	Jude	NA	NA	NA	NA	NA
Japan (Benesse) (2025)	Ao あお	Minato みなと	Haruto はると	Asahi あさひ	Ren れん	Yuito ゆいと	Nagi なぎ	Haru はる	Sora そら	Ritsu りつ
Japan (Meiji Yasuda) (2025)	Minato 湊	Iori 伊織	Yuito, Yūto 結翔	Rui, Ruki 琉生	Ren 蓮	Saku 朔	Ao 碧	Hinata 陽向	Haruto, Hinato, Haruka 陽翔	Ran, Ai 藍
Jordan (2023)	Muhamad	Adam	Ahmad	Yusuf	Umar	Shaham	Sanad	Karam	Amir	Hashim
Kazakhstan (2024)	Mukhammed (Мұхаммед)	Aysultan (Айсұлтан)	Alikhan (Алихан)	Mukhammad (Мұхаммад)	Omar (Омар)	Alidar (Әлидар)	Amir (Әмір)	Alan Алан	Ali (Әли)	Khamza (Хамза)
Kuwait (2015)	Mohammad	Abdullah	Fahad	Khaled	Ali	Yousef	Ahmed	Abdulaziz	Faisal	Bader
Kyrgyzstan (2021)	Muhammad (Мухаммад)	Umar (Умар)	Ali (Али)	Amir (Амир)	Bilal (Билал)	Alikhan (Алихан)	Alinur (Алинур)	Nurislam (Нурислам)	Emir (Эмир)	Usman (Усман)
Lebanon (2015)	Elie	Mohammad	Charbel	Ali	Hassan	Hussein	George	Ahmad	Christian	Joe
Malaysia (2017, BabyCenter)	Muhamad	Ahmad	Adam	Amar	Wan	Iman	Harraz	Izz	Umar	Aariz
Mongolia (2023)	Tenun	Khangai	Anand	Erhes	Tushig	NA	NA	NA	NA	NA
Myanmar (Total population)	Sun	Raza	Pan	Zan	Song	Jon	Lamin	Roi	Mao	Ba
Nepal(census of adult voters)	Ram राम	Krishan कृष्ण	Prem प्रेम	Dhan धन	Chandra चन्द्र	NA	NA	NA	NA	NA
Pakistan	Mohammad	Ali	Hussain	Omar	Bilal	Usman	Zahid	Shahid	Saqib	Nomaan
Philippines (2023)	Nathaniel	Gabriel	Jacob	Ezekiel	Ethan	Nathan	Matthew	Liam	Jayden	Noah
Saudi Arabia	Mohammad	Fahd	Abdullah	Abdulrahman	Turki	Bandar	Omar	Ali	NA	NA
South Korea (2023)	Yi-joon	Ha-joon	Do-yoon	Eun-woo	Seo-jun	Si-woo	Ji-ho	Seon-woo	Do-yeon	Yoo-joon
Sri Lanka (Total population)	Mohamed	Roshan	Dinesh	Saman	Pradeep	Mahesh	Mohammed	Fernando	Manoj	Abdul
Taiwan (1980s-1990s births, 2010 census)	Chia-hao (家豪)	Chih-ming (志明)	Chun-chieh (俊傑)	Chien-hung (建宏)	Chun-hung (俊宏)	Chih-hao (志豪)	Chih-wei (志偉)	Wen-Hsiung (文雄)	Chin-lung (金龍)	Chih-chiang (志強)
Tajikistan (2009)	Muhammad	Yusuf	Abdullo	Abubakr	NA	NA	NA	NA	NA	NA
Thailand (Total population)	Somchai	Prasoet	Sombun	Somsak	Narong	Prasit	Somphon	Sombat	Udom	Wichian
Turkey (Babies born, 2025)	Alparslan	Göktuğ	Metehan	Yusuf	Kerem	Miran	Ömer Asaf	Ömer	Atlas	Aras
Turkey (Overall, 2013)	Mehmet	Mustafa	Ahmet	Ali	Hüseyin	Hasan	Ibrahim	İsmail	Osman	Yusuf
Dubai, United Arab Emirates (2015)	Mohammad	Ali	Omar	Ahmad/Ahmed	Abdulla/Abdullah	NA	NA	NA	NA	NA
Uzbekistan (2023)	Muhammadali	Mustafo	Abdulloh	Muhammad	Muhammadyusuf	Muhammadamin	Nurmuhammad	Muhammadjon	Imronbek	Muhammadziyo
Vietnam	Tuân	Hùng	Nam	Huy	Long	Hai	Hieu	Son	Hoang	Duy

==== Female names ====
Region (year)	No. 1	No. 2	No. 3	No. 4	No. 5	No. 6	No. 7	No. 8	No. 9	No. 10
Arab world (2021) (BabyCenter Arabia members)	Maryam مريم	Fatima فاطمة	Lyn لين	Hur حور	Lian ليان	Maria ماريا	Malak ملك	Nur نور	Mila ميلا	Farah فرح
Armenia (2025, babies born)	Nare	Luse	Arp’i	Maria	Angelina	Yeva	Mane	Emili	Mariam	NA
Armenia (general population, 2020)	Anahit	Gayane	Anna	Karine	Hasmik	Lusine	Susanna	Armine	Narine	Lilit
Azerbaijan (2025)	Melisa	Zeinab (Zeynəb)	Maryam (Məryəm)	Nilay	Aylin	Ayla	Zahra (Zəhra)	İnci	Alisa	Fatima (Fatimə)
Azerbaijan (general population)	Sevinj	Gunel	Leyla	Aygun	Gunay	Sevda	Vusala	Konul	Aysel	Tarana
Bahrain (total population)	Fatima	Maryam	Mona	Eman	Huda	Hanan	Zahra	Amal	Nadia	Alaa
Bangladesh (2020-23)	Fatima	Ayesha	Taslima	Sumaiya	Saia	Faria	Jannat	Mariam	Musrat	Rafia
Bangladesh (total population)	Sharmin	Jannatul	Fatema	Sadia	Taslima	Tania	Salma	Asma	Nasrin	Farjana
Bhutan (total population)	Chandra	Man	Kinga	Krishna	Indra	Santa	Devi	Tara	Amber	Sita
Brunei (total population)	Lee	Nur	Nor	Ling	Ting	Noor	Hong	Chan	Mary	Han
Cambodia (total population)	Chan	Kim	Yan	Ni	Li	Sina	Sophie	Nan	Thea	Chang
China (most popular names for children in recent years)	Yī nuò (一诺)	Yī nuò (依诺)	Xīn yí (欣怡)	Zǐ hán (梓涵)	Yǔ tóng (语桐)	Xīn yán (欣妍)	Kě xīn (可欣)	Yǔ xī (语汐)	Yǔ tóng (雨桐)	Mèng yáo (梦瑶)
India	Aditi	Inaya	Aarya	Kiara	Aadhya	Vamika	Pari	Jiya	Mehar	Amayra
India (most common names, unofficial)	Sunita	Anita	Gita	Rekha	Shanti	Usha	Asha	Mina	Laxmi	Sita
Indonesia (general population as of 2023, including mononyms)	Nurhayati	Sulastri	Sumiati	Sri Wahyuni	Sumarni	Sunarti	Siti Aminah	Aminah	Ernawati	Kartini
Indonesia (2024, babies born)	Allea Shanum Almahyra	Alifazea Amanda	Adiva Arsyila Savina	Aleeya Dzakira	Khalisa Yumna Alzena	Arumi Nasha Razeta	Fatimah Azzahra	Inara Rizqiana Alesha	Fatimah Az Zahra	Maisya Salsabila
Iran (2019)	Fatemeh	Zahra	Helma	Zeinab	Yasna	Ava	Mersana	Nazanin-Zahra	Baran	Fatemeh-Zahra
Iran (general population)	Fatemeh	Zahra	Maryam	Ma'soumeh	Sakineh	Zeinab	Roghayyeh	Khadije	Leyla	Somayyeh
Israel (2025), newborn girls, total population	Avigail	Maryam, Miriam	Libi	Tamar	Lia	Sarah	Yael	Ella	Ayala	Noa
Israel (2025), Jewish girls	Avigail אביגיל	Libi ליבי	Tamar תמר	Yael יעל	Ella אלה	Noa נועה	Sarah שרה	Lia ליה	Ayala אילה	Adel/Edel אדל
Israel (2020), Muslim girls	Maryam	Shams	Lyn	Malek	Jori	Lian	Mila	Aline	Nur	Marya
Israel (2020), Christian Arab girls	Lin	Maria	Sama	Celine	Leah	NA	NA	NA	NA	NA
Israel (2020), Druze girls	Mila	Ayalah	Lur	Lin	Yasmin	NA	NA	NA	NA	NA
Japan (Benesse) (2025)	Sui すい	Himari ひまり	Rin りん	Mei めい	Hina ひな	Aoi あおい	Kotoha ことは	Tsumugi つむぎ	Yuzuki ゆづき	Mio みお
Japan (Meiji Yasuda) (2025)	Sui, Midori 翠	Himari 陽葵	Tsumugi 紬	Mashiro 茉白	Rin 凛	Hina 陽菜	Koharu 心陽	Iroha, Ayaha 彩葉	Uta 詩	Kotoha 琴葉, Yuna, Yuina 結菜
Jordan (2023)	Misk	Salma	Wateen	Massa	Zayna	Mariam	Mira	Sarah	Leen	Aylin
Kazakhstan (2024)	Aylin (Айлин)	Medina (Медина)	Asylym (Асылым)	Aysha (Айша)	Tomiris (Томирис)	Ayala (Аяла)	Ayim (Айым)	Rayana (Раяна)	Sofia (София)	Mariyam (Мәриям)
Kuwait (2015)	Fatma	Mariam	Hussa	Sherifa	Sara	Reem	Aisha	Dalal	Lulwa	Shaikha
Kyrgyzstan (2021)	Saliha (Салиха)	Rayana (Раяна)	Amina (Амина)	Fátima (Фатима)	Aylin (Айлин)	Aliya (Алия)	Safiya (Сафия)	Aruuzat (Аруузат)	Hadicha (Хадича)	Aruuke (Арууке)
Lebanon (2015)	Marie	Fatima	Jessica	Zeinab	Mariam	Sarah	Maya	Layla	Christina	Amal
Malaysia (2017, BabyCenter)	Nur	Wan	Nurul	Aisyah	Maryam	Siti	Dhia	Naura	Ayra	Puteri
Mongolia (2023)	Amin-Erdene	Michele	Sondor	Egshiglen	Anhilen	NA	NA	NA	NA	NA
Myanmar (Total population)	Min	Lin	Yu	Lei	Ni	Ye	Yin	Wei	Yan	Yi
Nepal (census of adult voters)	Laxmi लक्ष्मी	Kamala कमला	Sita सिता	Sunita सुनिता	Mina मिना	NA	NA	NA	NA	NA
Pakistan	Fatima	Fozia	Bismah	Sobia	Farrah	Maryam	Farzana	Ayesha	Sakeena	Zainab
Philippines (2023)	Althea	Angel	Zoey	Chloe	Nathalie	Sofia, Zia	Princess	Samantha	Ayesha	NA
Saudi Arabia	Sara	Latifa	Nora	Hessa	Maysoun	Maha	Nouf	Noor	Reema	Alanoud
South Korea (2023)	Seoh-ah	Yi-seo	Ah-yoon	Ji-ah	Ha-yoon	Seo-yoon	Ji-yoo	Shi-ah	Ji-an	Ah-rin
Sri Lanka (Total population)	Aruna	Asela	Amal	Ayesha	Nayana	Chandra	Priyanka	Anjana	Nirmala	
Taiwan (1980s-1990s births, 2010 census)	Shu-fen (淑芬)	Shu-hui (淑惠)	Mei-ling (美玲)	Ya-ting (雅婷)	Mei-hui (美惠)	Li-hua (麗華)	Shu-chuan (淑娟)	Shu-chen (淑貞)	I-chun (怡君)	Shu-hua (淑華)
Tajikistan (2009)	Sumayah	Asiya	Oisha	Googoosh	Anohito	Indira	NA	NA	NA	NA
Thailand (Total population)	Somchit	Nittaya	Prani	Kanchana	Sukanya	Mali	Wilai	Watsana	Rattana	Wanphen
Turkey (Babies born, 2025)	Alya	Defne	Gökçe	Zeynep	Asel	Umay	Asya	Elisa	İnci	Duru
Turkey (Overall, 2013)	Fatma	Ayşe	Emine	Hatice	Zeynep	Elif	Meryem	Şerife	Zehra	Sultan
Dubai, United Arab Emirates (2015)	Mariam	Sara/Sarah	Fatima/Fatma	Ayesha	Noor	NA	NA	NA	NA	NA
Uzbekistan (2023)	Soliha	Yasmina	Muslima	Hadicha	Imona	Shukrona	Sumayya	Ifora	Sa'diya	Mudina
Vietnam	Anh	Linh	Hà	Trang	Phương	Thảo	Ngọc	Thùy	Hoa	Nguyên

=== Europe ===
==== Male names ====
Region (year)	No. 1	No. 2	No. 3	No. 4	No. 5	No. 6	No. 7	No. 8	No. 9	No. 10
Albania (2019)	Noel	Aron	Joel	Roan	Amar	Mateo	Alteo	Roel	Luis	Dion
Andorra (2018)	Iker	Leo	Martí	Biel	Dylan	Jordi	Marc			
Austria (2024)	Elias	Paul	Noah	Jakob	Maximilian	Felix	Leon	David	Jonas	Leo
Belarus (2024)	Michail (Міхаіл)	Macviej (Мацвей)	Mark (Марк)	Raman (Раман)	Aliaksandr (Аляксандр)					
Belgium (2024)	Noah	Arthur	Jules	Louis	Liam	Adam	Gabriel	Victor	Lucas	Leon
Bosnia and Herzegovina, Federation of BiH, (2023)	Ali	Omar	Imran	Davud	Isa	Adi	Hamza	Feđa	Mak	Rejan
Bosnia and Herzegovina, Republika Srpska, (2024)	Vasilije	Lazar	Luka	Stefan	Uroš	Jovan	Dušan	Aleksa	Pavle	Matej
Bulgaria (2025)	Aleksandar (Александър)	Georgi (Георги)	Kaloyan (Калоян)	Martin (Мартин)	Teodor (Теодор)	Daniel (Даниел)	Nikola (Никола)	Dimitar (Димитър)	Boris (Борис)	Samuil (Самуил)
Croatia (2024)	Luka	Jakov	Toma	David	Petar	Niko	Ivan	Mateo	Roko	Matej
Cyprus (2011, census)	Andreas (Ανδρέας)	Georgios (Γεώργιος)	Konstantinos (Κωνσταντίνος)	Christos (Χρίστος)	Nikolaos (Νικόλαος)	Michalis (Μιχάλης)	Panagiotis (Παναγιώτης)	Ioannis (Ιωάννης)	Marios (Μάριος)	Dimitrios (Δημήτριος)
Czech Republic (2025)	Jakub	Matyáš	Jan	Adam	Matěj	David	Vojtěch	Oliver	Dominik	Daniel
Denmark (2024 births)	Oscar	Carl	William	Noah	August	Aksel	Emil	Oliver	Alfred	Theo
England,United Kingdom (2025)	Muhammad	Noah	Leo	Luca	Arthur	Oliver	George	Oscar	Theodore	Freddie
Estonia (2021-2024)	Mark	Robin	Hugo	Sebastian	Oliver	Oskar	Miron	Aron	David	Rasmus
Faroe Islands, Denmark (2024)	Nóa	Brandur, Jákup	Matteo	Eiri, Elias	Baldur, Jóhan, John, Jón, Lukas	NA	NA	NA	NA	NA
Finland (2025 births among Finnish speakers)	Eino	Leo	Elias	Väinö	Oliver	Onni	Emil	Alvar	Oiva	Aatos
Paris, France (2025)	Gabriel	Raphaël	Adam	Louis	Noah	Léon	Arthur	Isaac	Léon	Oscar
France (2024)	Gabriel	Raphaël	Louis	Léo	Noah	Arthur	Adam	Jules	Maël	Léon
Georgia (2024)	Giorgi (გიორგი)	Aleksandre (ალექსანდრე)	Demetre (დემეტრე)	Noe (ნოე)	Toma (თომა)	Luka (ლუკა)	Dachi (დაჩი)	Ioane (იოანე)	Vache (ვაჩე)	Daniel (დანიელ)
Berlin, Germany (2024)	Mohammed	Liam	Henry	Matteo	Noah	Emil	Theo	Elias	Finn	Oskar
Germany (2025)	Noah	Matteo	Elias	Theo	Leo	Luca	Paul	Leon	Emil	Felix
Gibraltar (2023)	Luca	Jack, Leon, Liam			James, Noah, Theo, William				NA	NA
Greece (2020-22)	Giorgos	Konstantinos	Ioannis	Dimitris	Nikolaos	Panagiotis	Christos	Alexandros	Vasilis	Angelos
Guernsey (2025)	Theodore	Harry, Leo	Freddie, Jack, Noah, Oliver, Tommy, William	NA	NA	NA	NA	NA	NA	NA
Hungary (2024)	Dominik	Olivér	Levente	Máté	Marcell	Bence	Milán	Noel	Zalán	Dániel
Iceland (2024 births)	Emil	Jökull	Óliver	Matthías	Birnir	Alexander	Aron	Styrmir	Birkir	Viktor
Ireland (2025)	Rían	Jack	Noah	James	Oisín	Fionn	Liam	Tadhg	Cillian	Leo
Isle of Man (2023)	Archie, Noah, Oliver			Luca, Teddi/Teddy, Theo/Theodore		NA	NA	NA	NA	NA
Italy (2024)	Leonardo	Edoardo	Tommaso	Francesco	Alessandro	Mattia	Lorenzo	Gabriele	Riccardo	Andrea
Jersey (2023)	Oliver	Oscar	Jack	Leo	Alfie	Archie	George	Gabriel	Lucas	Luca
Latvia (2024)	Olivers	Teodors	Emīls	Kārlis	Gustavs	Roberts	Jēkabs	Lūkass	Marks	Tomass
Liechtenstein (2024)	Leon, Noah/Noa	Elias, Julian, Laurin, Leano, Levi, Linus, Lio, Lionel, Luca,	Matteo/Mattheo, Theo, Valentin	NA	NA	NA	NA	NA	NA	NA
Lithuania (2025)	Markas	Benas	Jonas	Adomas	Matas	Nojus	Leonas	Lukas	Ąžuolas	Dominykas
Luxembourg (2023, babies born, total population)	Gabriel	Leo	Noah	Liam	Louis	NA	NA	NA	NA	NA
Luxembourg (2023; babies born to citizens)	Leo	Liam, Louis, Matteo, Noah	Elias	Luca, Theo	NA	NA	NA	NA	NA	NA
Luxembourg (2023; babies born to immigrants)	Gabriel	Lucas	Noah	Leonardo, Luca	NA	NA	NA	NA	NA	NA
North Macedonia (2012, general population)	Aleksandar	Zoran	Nikola	Goran	Dragan	Dejan	Petar	Igor	Ilija	Stefan
North Macedonia (2025)	Luka (Лука)	Damjan (Дамјан)	Matej (Матеј)	Marko (Марко)	Mihail (Михаил)	Jakov (Jakob)	David (Давид)	Jovan (Јован)	Petar (Петар)	Mateo (Матео)
Malta (2023)	Matteo	Noah	Luca	Jack	NA	NA	NA	NA	NA	NA
Moldova (2024)	David	Matei	Mark	Damir	Alexandru	Maxim	Bogdan	Luca	Damian	NA
Monaco (2024)	Jules	Léo	Noah	Liam	Louis	Raphaël	NA	NA	NA	NA
Montenegro (2023, general population)	Nikola (Никола)	Marko (Марко)	Miloš (Милош)	Luka (Лука)	Dragan (Драган)	Aleksandar (Александар)	Petar (Петар)	Zoran (Зоран)	Ivan (Иван)	Milan (Милан)
Montenegro (2019-2023 births)	Luka	Lazar	Vasilije	Petar	Bogdan	Vuk	Viktor	Stefan	Jakov	Andrej
Netherlands (2025)	Noah	Liam	Luca	Sem	Mees	James	Lucas	Sam	Finn	Levi
Northern Ireland, United Kingdom (2025)	Noah	Jack	James	Charlie	Leo	Oisin	Theo	Luca	Arthur, Jude	NA
Norway (2025)	Noah	Emil	William	Elias	Oliver	Izak	Liam	Johannes	Jakob	Olav
Poland (2025)	Nikodem	Antoni	Jan	Leon	Aleksander	Franciszek	Ignacy	Stanisław	Jakub	Mikołaj
Portugal (2025)	Francisco	Tomás	Duarte	Afonso	Vicente	João	Lourenço	Martin	Miguel	Gabriel
Romania (2023)	Andrei	Ştefan	Matei	Gabriel	Alexandru	David	Ioan	Ionut	Nicolas	Luca
Moscow, Russia (2024)	Mikhail (Михаила)	Aleksandr (Александр)	Lev (Лев)	Maxim (Максим)	Mark (Марк)	Ivan (Иван)	Artem (Артем)	Matvey (Матвей)	NA	NA
Russia (2012, official civil registry figures (ЗАГС))	Alexander (Александр)	Sergei (Сергей)	Dmitry (Дмитрий)	Andrei (Андрей)	Alexey (Алексей)	Maxim (Максим)	Evgeny (Евгений)	Ivan (Иван)	Mikhail (Михаил)	Artyom (Артём)
San Marino (2021)	Tommaso	Edoardo, Leonardo		NA	NA	NA	NA	NA	NA	NA
Scotland, United Kingdom (2025)	Noah	Luca	Rory	Muhammad	Oliver	Theo	Leo	Archie	Finlay	Harris
Serbia (2022, general population)	Dragan (Драган)	Aleksandar (Александар)	Milan (Милан)	Nikola (Никола)	Zoran (Зоран)	Marko (Марко)	Miloš (Милош)	Goran (Горан)	Dejan (Дејан)	Dušan (Душан)
Serbia (2024)	Luka (Лука)	Vasilije (Василије)	Bogdan (Богдан)	Lazar (Лазар)	Vukan (Вукан)	Stefan (Стефан)	Vuk (Вук)	Aleksa (Алекса)	Pavle (Павле)	Dušan (Душан)
Slovakia (2025)	Jakub	Samuel	Oliver	Adam	Michal	Tomáš	Filip	Tobias	Šimon	Matias
Slovenia (2023)	Luka	Nik	Filip	Jakob	Mark	Lovro	Liam	Tim	Lan, Oskar	Oliver
Spain (2023 excluding Basque Country & Catalonia)	Hugo	Mateo	Martín	Leo	Lucas	Manuel	Pablo	Alejandro	Enzo	Daniel
Basque Country, Spain (2023)	Oihan	Martín	Julen	Aimar	Markel	Ibai	Jon	Luka	Luken	Izei
Catalonia, Spain (2023)	Jan	Biel	Pol	Nil	Leo	Martí	Marc	Hugo	Àlex	Liam
Sweden (2025)	Noah	Hugo	Liam	Nils	Alfred	August	Oliver	William	Leo	Otto
Switzerland (2024, all births)	Noah	Liam	Matteo	Gabriel	Luca	Leo	Louis	Elio	Leon	Leano
Ukraine (2025)	Oleksandr (Олександр)	Mark (Марк)	Tymofiy (Тимофій)	Matviy (Матвій)	Maksym (Максим)	Artem (Артем)	Bohdan (Богдан)	Damir (Дамір)	Danylo (Данило)	Dmytro (Дмитро)
Wales, United Kingdom (2025)	Noah	Luca	Theo	Arthur	Freddie	Oliver	George	Leo	Archie	Osian

==== Female names ====
Region (year)	No. 1	No. 2	No. 3	No. 4	No. 5	No. 6	No. 7	No. 8	No. 9	No. 10
Albania (2019)	Amelia	Ajla	Aria	Amelja	Leandra	Ambra	Klea	Melisa	Amaris	Reina
Andorra (2018)	Martina	Emma, Jana, Lucia								
Austria (2024)	Emilia	Emma	Marie	Anna	Sophia	Mia	Lena	Valentina	Lea	Laura
Belarus (2024)	Safija (Сафія)	Yeva (Ева)	Hanna (Ганна)	Vasilisa (Васіліса)	Kseniya (Ксенія)	NA	NA	NA	NA	NA
Belgium (2024)	Olivia	Emma	Louise	Lina	Sofia	Eva	Mila	Alice	Juliette	Mia
Bosnia and Herzegovina, Federation of BiH, (2023)	Iman	Nur	Hana	Farah	Ema	Sara	Aya	Mia	Sofija	Una
Bosnia and Herzegovina, Republika Srpska, (2024)	Milica (Милица)	Sofija (Софија)	Marija (Марија)	Ana (Ана)	Irina (Ирина)	Dunja (Дуња)	Teodora (Теодора)	Nađa (Нађа)	Mila (Мила)	Una (Уна)
Bulgaria (2025)	Sofia (София)	Maria (Мария)	Victoria (Виктория)	Raya (Рая)	Nikol (Никол)	Daria (Дария)	Gabriela (Габриела)	Elena (Елена)	Alexandra (Александра)	Mihaela (Михаела)
Croatia (2024)	Mia	Rita	Nika	Mila	Lucija	Ema	Marta, Sara	Eva	Dora	Lara
Cyprus (2011, census)	Maria (Μαρία)	Eleni (Ελένη)	Androula (Ανδρούλα)	Georgia (Γεωργία)	Panagiota (Παναγιώτα)	Anna (Άννα)	Christina (Χριστίνα)	Katerina (Κατερίνα)	Ioanna (Ιωάννα)	Kyriaki (Κυριακή)
Czech Republic (2025)	Viktorie	Eliška	Sofie	Anna	Natálie	Amálie	Ema	Laura	Julie	Rozálie
Denmark (2024 births)	Emma	Ella	Luna	Alma	Frida	Olivia	Ida	Agnes	Karla	Nora
England, United Kingdom (2025)	Olivia	Lily	Amelia	Isla	Florence	Poppy	Freya	Ivy	Isabella	Elsie
Estonia (2021-2024)	Sofia	Mia	Eva	Emma	Emilia	Lenna	Olivia	Nora	Emily	Amelia
Faroe Islands, Denmark (2024)	Emma, Ida	Hanna, Olivia	Ann, Anna, Brim, Maria, Teresa	Bára, Elisa, Emilia, Glæma, Lillý, Lív, Marjun, Nora, Silja, Sólja	NA	NA	NA	NA	NA	NA
Finland (2025 births, among Finnish speakers)	Olivia	Linnea	Aino	Viola	Aava	Lilja	Sofia	Aada	Eevi	Isla
Paris, France (2025)	Alma	Louise	Olivia	Sofia	Iris	Adèle	Gabrielle	Emma	Alice	Rose
France (2024)	Louise	Jade	Ambre	Alba	Emma	Alma	Romy	Rose	Alice	Anna
Georgia (2024)	Nitsa (ნიცა)	Marta (მართა)	Mariam (მარიამ)	Elene (ელენე)	Mariami (მარიამი)	Taia (თაია)	Lile (ლილე)	Eva (ევა)	Nia (ნია)	Nene (ნენე)
Berlin, Germany (2024)	Hannah	Emma	Mia	Emilia	Mathilda	Lia	Charlotte	Clara	Mila	Emily
Germany (2025)	Sophia	Emma	Emilia	Hannah	Lina	Mia	Clara	Ella	Mila	Lia
Gibraltar (2023)	Ava, Lucia		Evie, Lily, Olivia, Sienna				NA	NA	NA	NA
Greece (2020-22)	Maria	Eleni	Aikaterini	Ioanna	Anastasia	Vasiliki	Anna	Sofia	Konstantina	Dimitra
Guernsey (2025)	Lilly	Bonnie, Imogen	Amelia, Ayla, Hallie, Olivia	NA	NA	NA	NA	NA	NA	NA
Hungary (2024)	Hanna	Anna	Luca	Zoé	Léna	Emma	Olívia	Boglárka	Lili	Kamilla
Iceland (2024 births)	Aþena, Embla		Birta, Emilía, Sara			Matthildur	Andrea, Bríet, Hekla, Júlía			
Ireland (2025)	Lily	Éabha	Fiadh	Grace	Sadie	Emily, Sophie	Olivia	Croía	Éala	Mia
Isle of Man (2023)	Isabella/Isabelle	Darcie/Darcy, Halle/Hallie, Mabel, Olivia, Willow								
Italy (2024)	Sofia	Aurora	Ginevra	Vittoria	Giulia	Beatrice	Ludovica	Alice	Emma	Matilde
Jersey (2023)	Olivia	Isla	Mia	Emilia	Emily	Isabella	Luna	Florence	Phoebe	Amelia
Latvia (2024)	Emīlija	Amēlija	Emma	Sofija	Nora	Marta	Melānija	Estere	Alise	NA
Liechtenstein (2024)	Sophia	Leyla, Livia	Alina, Chiara, Leonie, Lia, Paula	Ajla/Ayla, Amelie, Elisa, Emilia, Fiona, Freya, Hanna/Hannah, Ida, Ilenia, Laura, Lina, Lou, Luisa, Maya, Melina, Nelia, Noelia, Nora, Olivia, Romina, Timea, Valea	NA	NA	NA	NA	NA	NA
Lithuania (2025)	Sofija	Amelija	Adelė	Luknė	Liepa	Emilija	Olivija	Mateja	Gabija	Izabelė
Luxembourg (2023, babies born, total population)	Emma	Olivia	Mia	Maria	Chloé, Luna, Sofia					
Luxembourg (2023, babies born to citizens)	Mia	Sophie	Olivia	Chloé, Eva		Charlotte, Ellie, Emma				
Luxembourg (2023; babies born to immigrants)	Emma	Maria	Olivia	Sofia	Alice	NA	NA	NA	NA	NA
North Macedonia (2012, general population)	Marija	Elena	Biljana	Vesna	Snezana	Violeta	Aleksandra	Suzana	Katerina	Ivana
North Macedonia (2025)	Hana (Хана)	Jana (Јана)	Sofija (Софија)	Dua (Дуа)	Ana (Ана)	Jovana (Јована)	Mia (Миа)	Mila (Мила)	Sara (Сара)	Bisera (Бисера)
Malta (2023)	Emma	Valentina	Julia	Nina	NA	NA	NA	NA	NA	NA
Moldova (2024)	Sofia	Amelia	Eva	Maria	Victoria	Daria	Anastasia	Alexandra	Mia	Emma
Monaco (2024)	Rose	Victoria	Emma	Louise	Angelina	Lina	NA	NA	NA	NA
Montenegro (2023, general population)	Jelena (Јелена)	Milica (Милица)	Marija (Марија)	Ivana (Ивана)	Ana (Ана)	Milena (Милена)	Jovana (Јована)	Dragana (Драгана)	Vesna (Весна)	Anđela (Анђела)
Montenegro (2019-2023 births)	Sofija	Dunja	Maša	Sara	Teodora	Ksenija	Mila	Bogdana	Helena	Jana
Netherlands (2025)	Noor	Olivia	Nora	Julia	Mila	Sophie	Emma	Yara	Milou	Sara
Northern Ireland, United Kingdom (2025)	Grace	Fiadh	Olivia	Isla	Lily	Emily	Annie	Aoife	Meabh	Freya
Norway (2025)	Emma	Olivia	Nora	Ella	Frida	Sofie	Ellinor	Alma	Astrid, Hedda	Selma
Poland (2025)	Zofia	Maja	Zuzanna	Laura	Hanna	Julia	Oliwia	Pola	Alicja	Amelia
Portugal (2024)	Maria	Alice	Leonor	Matilde	Benedita	Aurora	Olívia	Carolina	Camilla	Francisca
Romania (2023)	Maria	Ioana	Elena	Stefania	Sofia	Anastasia	Andreea	Eva	Antonia	Gabriela
Russia (2024 births)	Sofiya (София)	Anna (Анна)	Mariya (Мария)	Yeva (Ева)	Viktoriya (Виктория)	Vasilisa (Василиса)	Varvara (Варвара)	Aleksandra (Александра)	Polina (Полина)	Alisa (Алиса)
Russia (2012, official civil registry figures (ЗАГС))	Anastasia (Анастасия)	Yelena (Елена)	Olga (Ольга)	Natalia (Наталья)	Yekaterina (Екатерина)	Anna (Анна)	Tatiana (Татьяна)	Maria (Мария)	Irina (Ирина)	Yulia (Юлия)
San Marino (2021)	Aurora, Sofia		NA	NA	NA	NA	NA	NA	NA	NA
Scotland, United Kingdom (2025)	Freya	Isla	Olivia	Amelia	Grace	Emily	Millie	Lily	Sophia	Rosie
Serbia (2022, general population)	Jelena (Јелена)	Milica (Милица)	Marija (Марија)	Dragana (Драгана)	Mirjana (Мирјана)	Ljiljana (Љиљана)	Snežana (Снежана)	Ivana (Ивана)	Gordana (Гордана)	Ana (Ана)
Serbia (2024)	Sofija (Софија)	Dunja (Дуња)	Mila (Мила)	Teodora (Теодора)	Tara (Тара)	Maša (Маша)	Nađa (Нађа)	Petra (Петра)	Milica (Милица)	Una (Уна)
Slovakia (2025)	Sofia	Eliška	Ema	Nina	Viktória	Sára	Olívia	Natália	Diana	Mia
Slovenia (2023)	Ema	Hana	Zala	Mia	Julija	Sofija	Ela	Ajda	Vita	Mila
Spain (2023, excluding Basque Country & Catalonia)	Lucía	Sofía	Martina	María	Julia	Valeria	Olivia	Emma	Paula	Vega
Basque Country, Spain (2023)	Malen	Laia	Ane	Nora	June	Alaia	Lucía	Maddi	Nahia	Martina
Catalonia, Spain (2023)	Martina	Júlia	Mia	Emma	Lucía	Ona	Gala	Sofía	Aina	Olivia
Sweden (2025)	Vera	Astrid	Olivia	Alice	Elsa	Alma	Freja	Selma	Ella	Alba
Switzerland (2024, all births)	Emma	Mia	Sofia	Emilia	Lina	Elena	Mila	Olivia	Nora	Lia
Ukraine (2025)	Sofiia (Софія)	Solomiya (Соломія)	Mariya (Марія)	Anastasiya (Анастасія)	Zlata (Злата)	Emiliya (Емілія)	Viktoriya (Вікторія)	Anna (Анна)	Polina (Поліна)	Kateryna (Катерина)
Wales, United Kingdom (2025)	Olivia	Lily	Elsie	Mali	Lottie	Freya	Harper	Florence	Evelyn	Amelia, Isla

=== Oceania ===
==== Male names ====
Region (year)	No. 1	No. 2	No. 3	No. 4	No. 5	No. 6	No. 7	No. 8	No. 9	No. 10
Australia (2024)	Oliver	Noah	Theodore	Henry	Luca	Leo	Hudson	Charlie	Jack	William
East Timor (Total population)	José	João	Francisco	Pedro	Domingos	David	Mario	John	Manuel	Luis
French Polynesia (2023)	Manea	Hia'ai	Kahanui	NA	NA	NA	NA	NA	NA	NA
Hawaii, United States (2024)	Noah	Elijah, Ezra, Liam	Theodore	Luca	Kai	Levi	Luke, Oliver	Ezekiel	James, Leo, Mateo, Maverick, Roman	Asher, Isaiah, Luka, Micah
New Caledonia (2023)	Gabriel	Samuel	Emmanuel	Joseph	Kayden	NA	NA	NA	NA	NA
New Zealand (2025)	Noah	Luca	Oliver	George	Theodore	Leo	Charlie	Jack	Elijah	Theo
New Zealand (Māori names, 2024/25)	Ariki	Wiremu	Koa	Mikaere	Rangi	Nikau	Rawiri	Kiwa	Kahurangi	Manaaki
Tahiti (common names, unofficial)	Hiro, Teiki, Moana, Manua, Marama, Teiva, Teva, Maui, Tehei, Tamatoa, Ioane, Tapuarii									

==== Female names ====
Region (year)	No. 1	No. 2	No. 3	No. 4	No. 5	No. 6	No. 7	No. 8	No. 9	No. 10
Australia (2024)	Charlotte	Amelia	Isla	Olivia	Mia	Hazel	Harper	Matilda	Sophie	Grace
East Timor (total population)	Ana	Joana	Isabel	Filomena	Elizabeth	Sandra	Rui	Nina	Juliana	Rita
French Polynesia (2023)	Kiana	Ohana	Merahi							
Hawaii (2024)	Olivia	Emma	Kaia	Amelia	Lily	Mia	Sophia	Ava	Isla	Aurora
New Caledonia (2023)	Zoé	Léna	Eva	Maya	Olivia					
New Zealand (2025)	Isla	Charlotte	Amelia	Hazel	Olivia	Lily	Lucy	Mila	Aria	Mia
New Zealand (Māori, 2024/25)	Aroha	Maia	Moana	Anahera	Atarangi	Manaia	Rangimarie	Rangi	Marama	Tui
Tahiti (unofficial)	Tiare	Hinano	Poema	Maeva	Hina	Vaea	Titaua	Moea	Moeata	Tarita

== See also ==
- Lists of most common surnames
- List of most popular given names by state in the United States
- Popularity of birth names for females (United States)
- Popularity of birth names for males (United States)
