= Ossian (given name) =

Ossian is an alternate form of the Irish Oisín and the Scottish Gaelic Oisein. The latter names are derived from a byname constructed from the element os ("stag"). The Welsh form of Oisín is Osian.

Ossian was one of several names popularised by the romantic works of James Macpherson (died 1796), composer of so-called Ossianic poetry. In consequence, it and other Ossianic names—such as Malvina, Minona, Orla, Oscar, and Selma—were enthusiastically adopted in Scandinavia in the nineteenth century. The specific adoption of Ossian in Denmark does not appear to have been a direct result of the works of Macpherson, however, but owes its popularity there as an import from Sweden. In this way Ossian is similar to the Ossianic names Oscar and Selma which were introduced into Denmark by Swedish immigrants.

== People with the name ==
- Ossian Berger (1849–1914), Swedish politician and lawyer
- Ossian Brown (born 1969), English musician and artist
- Ossian D'Ambrosio (born 1970), Italian modern Druid, musician and jeweler
- Ossian Donner (1866–1957), Finnish industrialist, engineer, politician and diplomat
- Ossian B. Hart (1821–1874), American politician, lawyer and jurist from Florida
- Ossian Everett Mills (1856–1920), founder of Phi Mu Alpha Sinfonia fraternity
- Ossian Ray (1835–1892), American politician
- Ossian Cole Simonds (1855–1931), American landscape designer
- Ossian Skiöld (1889–1961), Swedish hammer thrower
- Ossian Smyth, Irish politician
- Ossian Sweet (1895–1960), American physician
- Ossian Wuorenheimo (1845–1917), Finnish politician

== Fictional people with the name ==
- Ossian, narrator and purported author of a cycle of epic poems composed by the Scottish poet James Macpherson from 1760
- Oisín (also spelt Ossian in English), in Irish mythology the greatest poet of Ireland and a warrior
