= Nivi =

Nivi or NIVI may refer to:

== People ==
- Nivi (given name), including a list of people so named
- Babak Nivi, co-founder of AngelList
- Humberto Nivi, Netherlands Antilles singer-songwriter in the OTI Festival 1992
- Nivedita Menon (born 1960), Indian writer and professor of political science nicknamed "Nivi"
- Nivi, actor starring in the 2002 Telugu film Friends

== Other uses ==
- Nivi (garment), an Indian garment
- New International Version Inclusive Language Edition (NIVi), the 1995 edition of the Bible
- Novo Nordisk Foundation Initiative for Vaccines and Immunity (NIVI)

== See also ==
- Nivis, American technology company
