= List of the most popular names in the 1910s in the United States =

These are the most popular given names in the United States for all years of the 1910s. Data from the Social Security Administration.

== 1910 ==
- Males
  1. John
  2. William
  3. James
  4. Robert
  5. Joseph
  6. Charles; George (tie)
  7. Edward
  8. Frank
  9. Henry
  10. -----
- Females
  1. Mary
  2. Helen
  3. Margaret
  4. Dorothy; Ruth (tie)
  5. Anna
  6. Mildred
  7. Elizabeth
  8. Alice
  9. Ethel

== 1911 ==
- Males
  1. John
  2. William
  3. James
  4. Joseph
  5. Charles; Robert (tie)
  6. George
  7. Frank
  8. Edward
  9. Walter
  10. -----
- Females
  1. Mary
  2. Helen
  3. Dorothy; Margaret (tie)
  4. Ruth
  5. Anna
  6. Mildred
  7. Elizabeth
  8. Marie
  9. Gladys

== 1912 ==
- Males
  1. John
  2. William
  3. James
  4. Robert
  5. George
  6. Joseph
  7. Charles
  8. Frank
  9. Edward
  10. Thomas; Walter (tie)
- Females
  1. Mary
  2. Helen
  3. Dorothy
  4. Ruth
  5. Margaret
  6. Anna
  7. Mildred
  8. Frances
  9. Elizabeth
  10. Marie

== 1913 ==
- Males
  1. John
  2. William
  3. James
  4. Robert
  5. Joseph
  6. Charles
  7. George
  8. Frank
  9. Edward
  10. Thomas
- Females
  1. Mary
  2. Helen
  3. Dorothy
  4. Margaret
  5. Ruth
  6. Mildred
  7. Elizabeth
  8. Anna
  9. Marie
  10. Florence

== 1914 ==
- Males
  1. John
  2. William
  3. James
  4. Robert
  5. Joseph
  6. George
  7. Charles
  8. Frank
  9. Edward
  10. Walter
- Females
  1. Mary
  2. Helen
  3. Dorothy
  4. Margaret
  5. Ruth
  6. Mildred
  7. Anna
  8. Elizabeth
  9. Evelyn
  10. Marie

== 1915 ==
- Males
  1. John
  2. William
  3. James
  4. Robert
  5. Joseph
  6. Charles
  7. George
  8. Edward
  9. Frank
  10. Thomas
- Females
  1. Mary
  2. Helen
  3. Dorothy
  4. Margaret
  5. Ruth
  6. Anna
  7. Mildred
  8. Evelyn
  9. Virginia
  10. Elizabeth

== 1916 ==
- Males
  1. John
  2. William
  3. James
  4. Robert
  5. Charles
  6. George
  7. Joseph
  8. Edward
  9. Frank
  10. Walter
- Females
  1. Mary
  2. Helen
  3. Margaret
  4. Dorothy
  5. Ruth
  6. Mildred
  7. Anna
  8. Frances
  9. Elizabeth
  10. Marie

== 1917 ==
- Males
  1. John
  2. William
  3. James
  4. Robert
  5. Joseph
  6. George
  7. Charles
  8. Edward
  9. Frank
  10. Thomas; Walter (tie)
- Females
  1. Mary
  2. Helen
  3. Dorothy
  4. Margaret
  5. Ruth
  6. Anna
  7. Frances
  8. Elizabeth
  9. Mildred
  10. Marie

== 1918 ==
- Males
  1. John
  2. William
  3. Robert
  4. James
  5. Joseph
  6. Charles
  7. George
  8. Edward
  9. Frank
  10. Thomas
- Females
  1. Mary
  2. Helen
  3. Dorothy
  4. Margaret
  5. Ruth
  6. Frances
  7. Virginia
  8. Anna
  9. Mildred
  10. Elizabeth

== 1919 ==
- Males
  1. John
  2. William
  3. James
  4. Robert
  5. Charles
  6. Joseph
  7. George
  8. Edward
  9. Frank
  10. Thomas
- Females
  1. Mary
  2. Helen
  3. Dorothy
  4. Margaret
  5. Ruth
  6. Virginia
  7. Elizabeth
  8. Mildred
  9. Frances
  10. Anna
