= List of the most popular names in the 1950s in the United States =

These are the most popular given names in the United States for all years of the 1950s.

== 1950 ==
- Males
  1. John
  2. James
  3. Robert
  4. William
  5. Michael
  6. David
  7. Richard
  8. Thomas
  9. Charles
  10. Gary
- Females
  1. Linda
  2. Mary
  3. Patricia
  4. Barbara
  5. Susan
  6. Maria
  7. Sandra
  8. Nancy
  9. Deborah
  10. Kathleen

== 1951 ==
- Males
  1. Robert
  2. James
  3. John
  4. Michael
  5. David
  6. William
  7. Richard
  8. Thomas
  9. Charles
  10. Gary
- Females
  1. Linda
  2. Mary
  3. Patricia
  4. Barbara
  5. Deborah
  6. Susan
  7. Nancy
  8. Maria
  9. Kathleen
  10. Karen; Sandra (tie)

== 1952 ==
- Males
  1. James
  2. Robert
  3. John
  4. Michael
  5. David
  6. William
  7. Richard
  8. Thomas
  9. Charles
  10. Gary
- Females
  1. Linda
  2. Mary
  3. Patricia
  4. Deborah
  5. Barbara
  6. Susan
  7. Maria
  8. Nancy
  9. Debra
  10. Kathleen

== 1953 ==
- Males
  1. Michael
  2. Robert
  3. James
  4. John
  5. David
  6. William
  7. Richard
  8. Thomas
  9. Gary
  10. Charles
- Females
  1. Mary
  2. Linda
  3. Deborah
  4. Patricia
  5. Susan
  6. Barbara
  7. Debra
  8. Maria
  9. Nancy
  10. Karen

== 1954 ==
- Males
  1. Robert
  2. Michael
  3. John
  4. James
  5. David
  6. William
  7. Richard
  8. Thomas
  9. Mark
  10. Gary
- Females
  1. Mary
  2. Deborah
  3. Linda
  4. Debra
  5. Patricia; Susan (tie)
  6. Barbara
  7. Maria
  8. Karen
  9. Nancy
  10. ----

== 1955 ==
- Males
  1. Michael
  2. James
  3. David; Robert (tie)
  4. John
  5. William
  6. Richard
  7. Mark
  8. Thomas
  9. Charles; Steven (tie)
  10. ----
- Females
  1. Mary
  2. Deborah
  3. Debra; Linda (tie)
  4. Patricia
  5. Susan
  6. Maria
  7. Barbara
  8. Karen
  9. Nancy
  10. ----

== 1956 ==
- Males
  1. Michael
  2. Robert
  3. David
  4. James
  5. John
  6. William
  7. Richard
  8. Mark
  9. Thomas
  10. Steven
- Females
  1. Mary
  2. Susan
  3. Debra
  4. Linda
  5. Deborah
  6. Patricia
  7. Karen
  8. Maria
  9. Barbara
  10. Donna

== 1957 ==
- Males
  1. Michael
  2. James
  3. Robert
  4. David
  5. John
  6. William
  7. Richard
  8. Mark
  9. Thomas
  10. Steven
- Females
  1. Mary
  2. Susan
  3. Linda
  4. Karen
  5. Patricia
  6. Deborah; Debra (tie)
  7. Maria
  8. Nancy
  9. ----

== 1958 ==
- Males
  1. Michael
  2. David
  3. Robert
  4. John
  5. James
  6. William
  7. Mark
  8. Richard
  9. Thomas
  10. Charles
- Females
  1. Mary
  2. Linda
  3. Susan
  4. Patricia
  5. Karen
  6. Maria
  7. Debra
  8. Cynthia
  9. Deborah
  10. Barbara

== 1959 ==
- Males
  1. Michael
  2. David
  3. James
  4. John
  5. Robert
  6. Mark
  7. William
  8. Richard
  9. Thomas
  10. Steven
- Females
  1. Mary
  2. Susan
  3. Linda
  4. Donna; Patricia (tie)
  5. Maria
  6. Karen
  7. Debra
  8. Cynthia
  9. Deborah
  10. ----
