= Aliou (name) =

Aliou is both a given name and a surname. Notable people with the name include:

- Aliou Badji (born 1997), Senegalese footballer
- Aliou Siby Badra, Ivorian footballer
- Aliou Baldé (born 2002), Senegalese footballer
- Aliou Cissé (born 1976), Senegalese footballer
- Aliou Coly (born 1992), Senegalese footballer
- Aliou Dia (born 1990), French footballer
- Aliou Diarra (born 2001), Malian basketball player
- Aliou Dieng (born 1997), Malian footballer
- Aliou Mahamidou (1947–1996), Nigerien businessman
- Aliou Traoré (born 2001), French footballer
- Thierno Aliou (c. 1850–1927), Fula author
- Thierno Aliou Diallo, Guinean politician
- Mamadou Aliou Keïta (1952–2004), Guinean footballer
