= Liam =

Masculine given name of Irish origin

- Pronunciation: English: /ˈliːəm/ LEE-əm; Irish: [ˈl̠ʲiəmˠ]
- Gender: Masculine

Origin
- Derivation: Short form of Uilliam, the Irish form of William
- Region of origin: Ireland

Other names
- Related names: Will; Willy/Willie; Bill; Billy/Billie
- Popularity: see popular names

Liam is a traditional Irish short form of Uilliam, the Irish-language adaptation of the Germanic name William.

== Etymology ==
The original name was a merging of two Old German elements: willa ("will" or "resolution"); and helma ("helmet"). The juxtaposition of these elements effectively means "helmet of will" or "guardian".

When the Frankish Empire was divided, the name developed differently in each region. In Northern Francia, Willahelm developed first into "Willelm" and then into "Willaume" in Norman and Picard, and "Guillaume" in Ile-de-France French. The Norman form was further developed by the English into the familiar modern form "William".

After the Anglo-Norman invasion of Ireland in the 12th century, William was borrowed into Irish as Uilliam. A Gaelic diminutive of the name, Uillec (later Uilleag), is attested by the early 14th century, but Liam, a further-clipped form of Uilliam, has no recorded use before the 17th century and appears to have become established only around 1900.

== Origin ==
Although the names Willahelm and Guillaume were well known in England before 1066, through Saxon dealings with Guillaume, Duc de Normandie, it was viewed as a "foreign" name. The Norman Conquest had a dramatic effect on English names. Many if not most Saxon names, such as Ethelred, died out under the massive influx of French ones. Since the Royal Court now rang with names such as Alain, Guy, Reginald and William, they were quickly adopted by the English, the Welsh, and eventually the Irish.

Within a generation, the "new" names had become so completely assimilated that they were regarded as homegrown, and variant forms evolved and thrived alongside one another. In Wales, both William and Gwilym became popular, as did the short forms Wil and Gwil, and almost every village had its own Gwilym Williams (the final "s" represented "son of" or "descendant of"). The Norman conquest of Ireland followed a similar pattern to that of England a century earlier. Within a generation, the Irish Uilliam was found alongside William, and the short form of both was Liam.

Until the end of the 18th century, Liam was virtually unknown outside Ireland. In the mid-1850s, over a million and a half people left Ireland to escape the catastrophic great famine and, from then on, Irish names were heard everywhere. Liam as an independent name in England and Wales dates from 1932, but it was mainly confined to the families of Irish descent. By 1955, it was recorded for two boys in every 10,000, a figure it maintained until 1975, when it rose to four per 10,000.

== Late 20th and early 21st centuries ==
By 1980, it was clear that Liam was becoming a vogue name in the general population in the United Kingdom and that year it was recorded for 12 boys per 10,000. It continued to gain ground. In 1985, it stood at 20 per 10,000, and by 1990, it was recorded for 100 boys in every 10,000. In 1996, Liam peaked in popularity as the 10th most popular baby name for boys in England and Wales, according to the UK Office for National Statistics.

Liam continued to remain in the top 33 most popular boys names in the UK throughout the first decade of the 21st century but started to steadily decline in 2009.

Meanwhile, according to the Social Security Administration, Liam had been steadily gaining in popularity in the United States and entered the top 50 names for the first time in 2009 at number 49. As Liam gained popularity in the US, climbing to number two by 2013, popularity in the UK plummeted, and it ranked 67th that same year. Liam was among the five most popular names for Hispanic newborn boys and newborn boys of Asian descent in the American state of Virginia in 2022. In Canada, Liam was the most popular boys name from 2012 to 2020.

Year	Rank in the US	Rank in the UK	Rank in Canada
1994	360	17	104
1995	240	Not available	58
1996	184	10	46
1997	162	15	37
1998	155	24	35
1999	141	17	28
2000	140	19	31
2001	131	24	24
2002	113	23	24
2003	114	29	19
2004	112	30	19
2005	104	28	13
2006	98	32	16
2007	89	27	16
2008	75	22	10
2009	49	24	4
2010	30	33	3
2011	15	44	3
2012	6	50	1
2013	3	67	1
2014	2	76	1
2015	2	81	1
2016	2	97	1
2017	1	91	1
2018	1	85	1
2019	1		1
2020	1		1
2021	1		2
2022	1		2

The name is also popular worldwide for boys in Argentina, Belgium, Ireland, Netherlands, Norway, Quebec, Canada, Sweden, and Switzerland.
