= Oisin =

Oisín
- Pronunciation: Irish: [əˈʃiːnʲ, ˈɔʃiːnʲ]
- Gender: Male
- Language: Irish

Origin
- Origin: os
- Meaning: "fawn", "little deer"
- Region of origin: Ireland

Other names
- Alternative spelling: Oisin
- Variant forms: Osheen, Ossian, Oisean, Osian

Oisín (pronounced [əˈʃiːnʲ, ˈɔʃiːnʲ], approximately USH-een) is an Irish male given name; meaning "fawn" or "little deer", derived from the Irish word os ("deer") + -ín (diminutive suffix). It is sometimes anglicized as Osheen (/ɒˈʃiːn/ OSH-een) or spelt without the acute accent (fada), as Oisin.

Variants in other languages include Scottish Gaelic: Oisean (pronounced [ˈɔʃan]), Welsh: Osian and English: Ossian.

== People with the name ==
- Oisín, legendary Irish poet
- Oisín Fagan (born 1973), Irish professional boxer
- Oisín Gallen, Irish Gaelic footballer
- Oisín Gough (born 1989), Irish hurler
- Oisín Kelly (1915–1981), Irish sculptor
- Oisín Kelly (born 1997), Irish hurler
- Oisín Mac Diarmada (born 1978), Irish fiddler
- Oisín McConville (born 1975), Irish Gaelic footballer
- Oisin McEntee (born 2001), Irish footballer
- Oisín McGann (born 1973), Irish writer and illustrator
- Oisín Mullin (born 2000), Irish footballer
- Oisin Murphy (born 1995), Irish jockey
- Oisín Quinn (born 1969), Irish politician
- Oisín Stack, Irish actor

== See also ==
- List of Irish-language given names
