= Charbel =

Charbel or Sharbel may refer to:

== Religion ==
- Maronite Catholic Eparchy of Saint Charbel in Buenos Aires, named after St. Charbel Makhlouf
- Acts of Sharbel, a Syriac Christian martyrdom text

== People ==
=== Mononym ===
- Charbel (martyr) (died 107 AD), Christian martyr

=== Surname ===
- Marwan Charbel (born 1947), Lebanese brigadier general and minister

=== Given name ===
- Charbel Dagher, Lebanese literature professor, poet and journalist
- Charbel Farhat, Lebanese-American engineering professor
- Charbel Georges, Swedish footballer
- Charbel Georges Merhi (born 1937), an eparch of the Maronite Catholic Eparchy of San Charbel in Buenos Aires
- Charbel Iskandar, Lebanese actor
- Charbel Makhlouf (1828–1898), Lebanese Maronite monk and saint
- Charbel Nader, Australian investment banker
- Charbel Nahas, Lebanese politician and minister
- Charbel Rouhana, Lebanese oud player
- Sarbel, Greek-British pop singer of Greek-Cypriot & Lebanese ancestry
- Sharbel Maroun, Lebanese Maronite priest
- Sharbel Touma, Lebanon-born Swedish footballer
