= Lusine (name) =

Lusine is an Armenian origin feminine given name. People with the name include:

- Lusine Aghabekyan (born 1990), Armenian musician
- Lusine Badalyan (born 1980), Armenian television presenter and politician
- Lusine Gevorkyan (born 1983), Armenian musician
- Lusine Hovhannisyan (born 1990), Armenian football player
- Lusine Tovmasyan (born 1986), Armenian beauty pageant contestant and model
- Lusine Zakaryan (1937–1992), Armenian musician

== See also ==
- Lusine, the stage name of Jeff McIlwain
