= Thierno Aliou Diallo =

Guinean politician

Deputy in the National Assembly (Guinea), 2nd Vice-President of the Education Commission
- President: Alpha Conde
- Preceded by: Ramatoulaye Diallo
- Constituency: Labé

Personal details
- Party: Rally of the Guinean People

Thierno Aliou Diallo is a Guinean politician who represents the constituency of Labé, in the National Assembly (Guinea). He is a member of the Majority Rally of the Guinean People Party of former president Alpha Conde.
