= Ivalu =

Ivalu is a Greenlandic Inuit feminine given name meaning "tendon, thread, sinew." It was among the 10 most popular names given to girls born in Greenland during the past decade. Ivalo is an older spelling of the same name. The variant name Ivalo was given to Princess Josephine of Denmark, born in 2011, as one of her middle names.

Ivalu is also the name of a 1930 novel by Peter Freuchen.

== People with the surname ==
- Madeline Ivalu, Canadian Inuk filmmaker and actor
- Paul-Dylan Ivalu, Canadian Inuk actor
