= Vache =

Vache, sometimes written as Vatché or Vaché, may refer to:

== Places ==
- Île à Vache, a small island lying off the south-west peninsula of Haiti.
- The Vache, an estate near Chalfont St. Giles in Buckinghamshire.
- Rivière aux Vaches, a tributary of the Saint-François River in Quebec, Canada

== People ==
=== Royalty ===
- Vache of Iberia (died 231 or 234), king of Iberia
- Vache I of Albania (fl. c. 336–c. 360), second Arsacid ruler of Caucasian Albania
- Vache II of Albania (fl. c. 440–c. 462, king of Caucasian Albania
- Vache of Kakheti (died 839), prince and chorepiscopus of Kakheti in eastern Georgia
- Vache I Vachutian (died c. 1232), Armenian prince and founder of the Vachutian dynasty
- Vache II Amberdtsi, 13th century Armenian prince of the Vachutian dynasty
- Vache III Amberdtsi, 13th and/or 14th century Armenian prince of the Vachutian dynasty

=== Modern given name ===
- Vatche Arslanian (1955–2003), member of the Canadian Red Cross and head of logistics for the International Committee of the Red Cross (ICRC) in Iraq
- Vatche Boulghourjian, Lebanese Armenian film director
- Vache Gabrielyan (born 1968), Armenian politician
- Vache Hovsepyan (1925–1978), Armenian musician and duduk player
- Vache Sharafyan (born 1966), Armenian composer
- Vache Tovmasyan (born 1986), Armenian actor, comedian, and showman

=== Surname ===
- Allan Vaché (born 1953), American jazz clarinetist, son of Warren Vaché Sr.
- Charles Vaché (1926–2009), American Episcopal Bishop of Virginia
- Jacques Vaché (1895–1919), friend of André Breton and a chief inspiration behind the Surrealist movement
- Tex Vache (1888–1953), American baseball player
- Warren Vaché Sr. (1914–2005), American jazz musician and journalist
- Warren Vaché Jr. (born 1951), American jazz musician, son of Warren Vaché Sr.

== Other uses ==
- Vache (grape), another name for the French wine grape Mondeuse noire
