= Yanet =

Yanet is a feminine given name. Notable people with the name include:

- Yanet Bermoy (born 1987), Cuban judoka
- Yanet Cruz (born 1988), Cuban javelin thrower
- Yanet Hernández Pérez (born 1969), Cuban politician
- Milaxy Yanet Sánchez Armas (born 1972), Cuban politician
- Yanet Seyoum (born 1994), Ethiopian swimmer
- Yanet Sovero (born 1983), Peruvian freestyle wrestler

== See also ==
- Janet (given name)
