= Luknė =

Lithuanian feminine given name

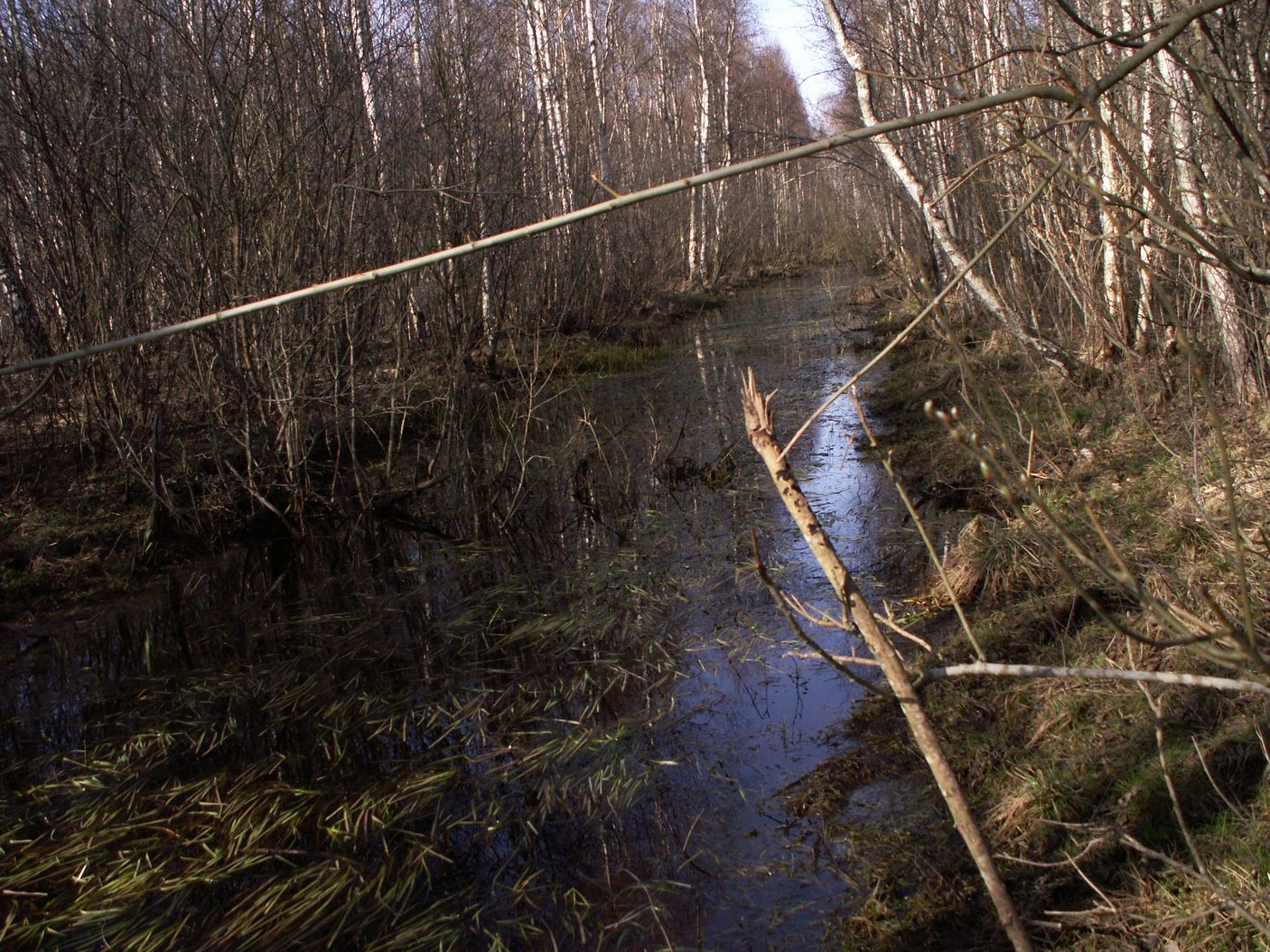
- Luknė, the name of the rivulet in Lithuania that is pictured, is also a well-used name for Lithuanian girls.
- Gender: Feminine
- Language: Lithuania

Origin
- Meaning: taken from the name of the Lithuanian rivulet Luknė
- Region of origin: Lithuania

Luknė is a feminine given name of Lithuanian origin. It was the seventh most popular name for newborn girls in Lithuania in 2021 and the third most used name for newborn girls there in 2022. Luknė is a geographic name taken from the name of the Luknė River in Lithuania. The Etymological Dictionary of Lithuanian language associates the word with the Slavic term for water lily, with the proto-Slavic roots luk- for bend and lug- for swamp or meadow, and some other hypotheses.
