= Rangi =

Rangi may refer to:

== Names ==
- Rangi, the primal sky father in Māori mythology
- Rangi Chase, New Zealand rugby league footballer
- Rangi Mātāmua, New Zealand Māori astronomer and indigenous studies academic
- Rangi Topeora (died 1865–1873?), New Zealand tribal leader, peacemaker and composer of waiata
- Anaru Rangi (born 1988), New Zealand rugby union footballer
- Tutekohi Rangi (1871–1956), New Zealand Māori tohunga and faith healer

=== Fictional characters ===
- Rangi, a character in the novel The Rise of Kyoshi and its sequel, The Shadow of Kyoshi
- Jaskirat Singh Rangi, protagonist of the 2025 Indian film Dhurandhar, portrayed by Ranveer Singh

== Groups of people ==
- Rangi (ethnic group), of Tanzania
  - Rangi language, the language spoken by the Rangi people

== Other uses ==
- Rangi (video game), a virtual reality adventure puzzle video game
- Kue rangi, Indonesian coconut waffle-like cake

== See also ==
- Rang (disambiguation)
