= Ainara =

Female given name

- Gender: Female

Origin
- Origin: Basque
- Meaning: swallow
- Region of origin: Basque Country

Other names
- Variant form: Enara

Ainara or Enara is a Basque language feminine given name meaning "swallow bird".

== People ==
=== Ainara ===
- Ainara Elbusto (born 1992), Spanish racing cyclist
- Ainara Manterola (born 1995), Spanish footballer
- Ainara Osoro (born 1987), Basque political scientist, sociologist, professor and politician
- Ainara Sanz (born 1995), Spanish racing cyclist

=== Enara ===
- Enara López (born 1997), Spanish racing cyclist
