= Ajda =

Ajda is an Arabic and Turkish surname and given name, and a Slovene word for buckwheat, infrequently also used as a female given name. It may refer to:

- Ajda Asgari (born 1989), Swedish politician
- Ajda Novak (born 1993), Slovenian slalom canoeist
- Ajda Pekkan (born 1946), also known as Süperstar, Turkish pop singer and actress
- Masruq ibn al-Ajda' (died 682), tabi'i, jurist and muĥaddith
