= Charbel Iskandar =

Lebanese actor (born 1966)

- شربل اسكندر
- Born: 1966 (age 59–60)
- Mother: Mary Dib

Charbel Iskandar (Arabic: شربل اسكندر) is a Lebanese actor. He has had roles on Lebanese television series such as The Game of Death (لعبة الموت) and Cheri bil Taqseet. He is also a stage actor and has worked in a number of voice-over roles.

== Filmography ==
Film

Year	Title	Role	Notes
2015	Go Home	Marwan	
2005	Zozo	Zozo's Father	

Television

Year	Title	Role	Notes
2019	The Dean		Uncredited
2016	Half Day	Assaad	Recurring
2015	Cello	-	Recurring
2013	Game of Death		Recurring
