= Minik (given name) =

Minik is a Greenlandic Inuit name meaning "viscid train oil which is being used as sealing for skin boats". The name was given to Prince Vincent of Denmark, born in 2011, as one of his middle names.

== Notable people ==
- Minik, later Minik Wallace (ca. 1890 – 1918), an Inuk brought to the United States of America from Greenland along with five other Inuit in 1897 by explorer Robert Peary
