= Modou =

Modou is an African masculine given name that may refer to

- Modou Bamba Gaye, Gambian politician
- Modou Barrow (born 1992), Gambian football player
- Kabba-Modou Cham (born 1992), Belgian-born Gambian football player
- Modou Dia (born 1950), Senegalese politician and diplomat
- Modou Diagne (born 1994), Senegalese football player
- Modou Jadama (1994-2024), American association football player of Gambian descent
- Modou Jagne (born 1983), Gambian association football player
- Pa Modou Jagne (born 1989), Gambian association football player
- Pa-Modou Kah (born 1980), Norwegian football coach and former player
- Modou Kouta, Chadian football player and manager
- Modou Sady Diagne (born 1954), Senegalese basketball player
- Modou Sougou (born 1984), Senegalese football player
- Modou Sowe (born 1963), Gambian football referee
- Modou Tall (born 1953), Senegalese basketball player
