= Aatos =

Aatos is a Finnish masculine given name. People with the name are as follows:

== Given name ==
- Aatos Erkko (1932–2012), Finnish journalist and businessman
- Aatos Hirvisalo (1915–1992), Finnish sailor
- Aatos Jaskari (1904–1962), Finnish wrestler
- Aatos Lehtonen (1914–2005), Finnish football player
- Aatos Tapala (born 1940), Finnish actor and opera singer

== Middle name ==
- Jalo Aatos Fred (1917–2003), Finnish chess player
- Pentti Aatos Kahma (born 1943), Finnish discus thrower

== Others ==
- Aatos Punanen, stage name of Jan Erola
