= Tomris =

- Gender: Female

Origin
- Origin: Iranic

Other names
- Derived: Saka: Taumuriyah; Turkic: Tamyr

Tomris, Tomiris or Tamiris is a Massagetae female name used in Azerbaijan, Turkey, Turkmenistan, Uzbekistan, and Kazakhstan. The name is a modern derivation of Tomyris, an ancient Massagetae queen from Central Asia.

== Name ==
The name Tomyris originates from the Ancient Greek Τομυρις (Tomuris), a Hellenized form of the Saka term Taumuriyaʰ, which is associated with kinship. This term is etymologically linked to the Avestan word taoxman (𐬙𐬀𐬊𐬑𐬨𐬀𐬥) and the Old Persian taumā (𐎫𐎢𐎶𐎠), both conveying meanings such as "family," "seed," or "descent." The Scythian royal names have been studied extensively. Some scholars also analyze the mythological origin of Scythian kingship.

== People ==
- Tomris Giritlioğlu (1957–2024), a Turkish film director.
- Tomris İncer (1947–2015), a Turkish actress.
- Tomris Uyar (1941–2003), a Turkish writer and translator.

== See also ==
- Tomyris
