= Nikau (name) =

Nikau is both a given name and a surname. Notable people with the name include:

== Surname ==
- Tawera Nikau (born 1967), New Zealand former professional rugby league footballer

== Fictional characters ==
- Nikau Parata, character from the Australian television soap opera, Home and Away
