= Rangimarie =

Rangimarie or Rangimārie can refer to:

== Places ==
=== Marae ===
- Rangimarie Marae, in Poroporo

=== Whare ===
- Rangimarie (Hawke's Bay whare), in Puketapu
- Rangimārie meeting house, Ōruawharo
- Rangimarie (Ngāti Paoa whare), in Pūkorokoro / Miranda
- Rangimarie (Ngāpuhi whare), in Motatau
- Rangimarie (Ruapeka meeting house), in Tapapa

== People ==
=== Given name ===
- Rangimarie Edwards-Bruce (born 1997), New Zealand rugby league footballer
- Rangimārie Hetet (1892–1995), master weaver of Ngāti Maniapoto
- Rangimārie Naida Glavish, better known as Naida Glavish (born 1946), New Zealand politician and Māori community leader

=== Surname ===
- Puna Himene Te Rangimarie (fl. 1908–1911), New Zealand healer, nurse, and spiritual leader

=== Fictional characters ===
- Rangimarie Hudson, character from New Zealand soap opera Shortland Street
- Rangimarie Rameka, character from New Zealand soap opera Shortland Street
