= Sóley (given name) =

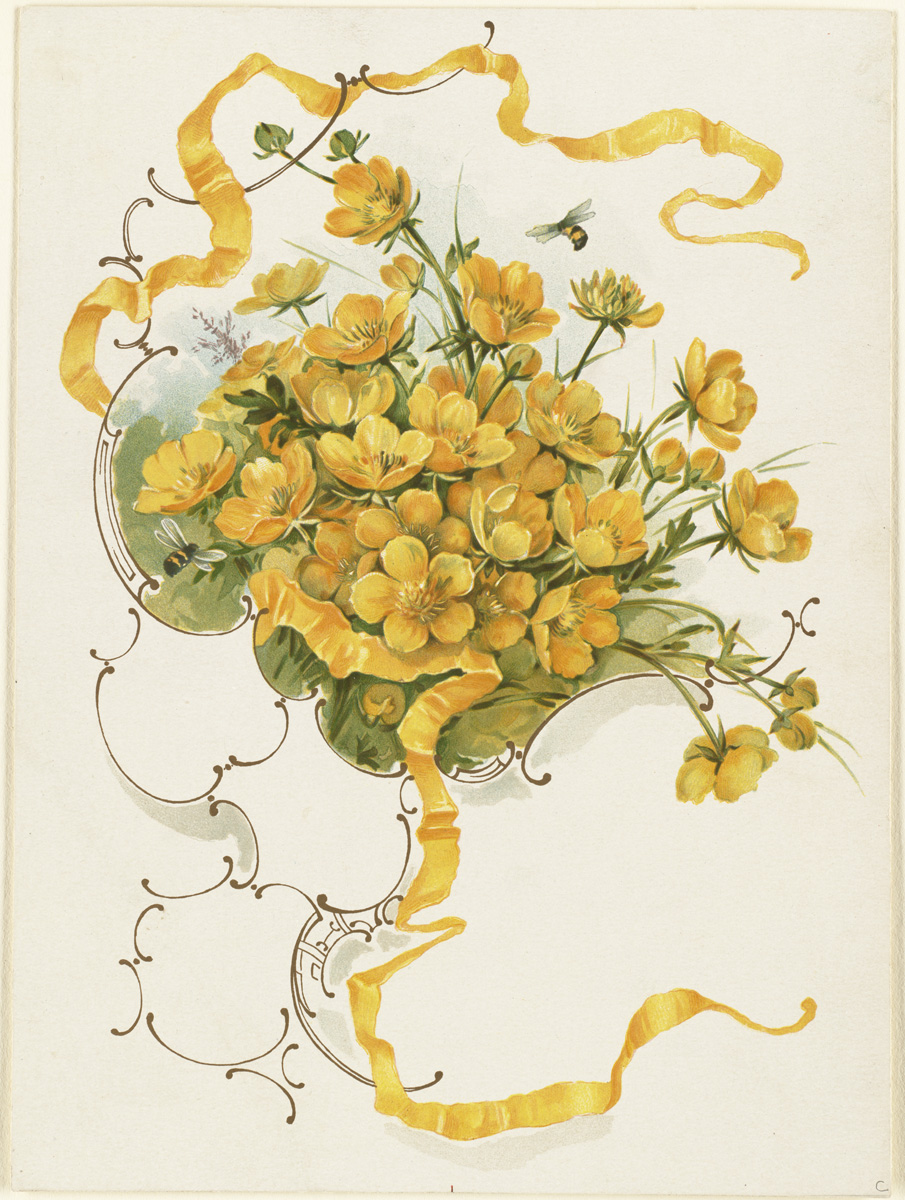
- The name Sóley means buttercup.
- Pronunciation: Icelandic: [ˈsouːl.eiː]
- Gender: Feminine
- Language: Faroese, Icelandic

Origin
- Meaning: Buttercup
- Region of origin: Faroe Islands, Iceland

Sóley (Icelandic: [ˈsouːl.eiː]) is a feminine given name of Icelandic origin meaning buttercup. The name is also in use in the Faroe Islands. The name is a diminutive for the Faroese name Sólja, also meaning buttercup, or a combination of the Germanic name elements sol, meaning sun, and ey, meaning island.

== Usage ==
The name was among the ten most popular names for newborn girls in Iceland in 2021. The name, spelled Soley, was given to eleven newborn girls in the United States in 2021 and eleven girls in 2022. Variant Sólja was among the ten most popular names for newborn girls in the Faroe Islands in 2021 and 2022.

== People ==
- Sóley (born 1987), Icelandic musician
- Sóley Sesselja Bender (born 1953), Icelandic academic
- Erna Sóley Gunnarsdóttir (born 2000), Icelandic shot putter
- Guðrún Sóley Gunnarsdóttir (born 1982), Icelandic footballer
- Elín Sóley Hrafnkelsdóttir (born 1998), Icelandic basketball player
- Sóley Tómasdóttir (born 1974), Icelandic politician
