= Ajla =

Ajla (spoken "eye-lə") is a feminine given name in various areas around the Eastern Mediterranean. In Arabic it means the “brightest”, “most dazzling”, “most brilliant”, smart. In Turkish it means ’’moonlight’’’ or “halo”, and in Bosnia and Herzegovina the name means "The one who shines in moonlight". The given name is also used elsewhere in the former Yugoslavia such as Croatia.

Ajla also means “oak tree” in Hebrew.

== Etymology ==
From Turkish word Ayla, halo around the moon.

== People ==
- Ajla Del Ponte (born 1996), Swiss sprinter
- Ajla Hodžić (born 1980), Bosnian actress
- Ajla Tomljanović (born 1993), Croatian-Australian professional tennis player
