= Lavi (name) =

Lavi is a masculine given name and surname of Hebrew origin meaning lion. It may refer to the following notable people:

== Given name ==
- Lavi Crain (born 2010), American artistic gymnast
- Lavi Hrib (born 1973), Romanian football defender

== Surname ==
- Amir Lavi (born 1988), Israeli football player
- Amos Lavi (1953–2010), Israeli stage and film actor
- Daliah Lavi (1942–2017), Israeli actress and singer
- David Lavi (born 1956), Israeli football player
- Inbar Lavi (born 1986), Israeli-American actress
- Moran Lavi (born 1983), Israeli football player
- Mordechai Lavi (born 1978), Israeli radio broadcaster
- Neta Lavi (born 1996), Israeli football player
- Shimon Lavi (1486–1585), Sephardi kabbalist, physician, astronomer and poet
- Shlomo Lavi (1882–1963), Zionist activist and politician
- Veikko Lavi (1912–1996), Finnish singer, songwriter and author.
- Yaniv Lavi (born 1988), Israeli football player and manager
- Yoel Lavi (born 1950), Israeli politician
