= Okot =

Oköt is a Ugandan name, particularly for males in Acoli culture. It may refer to: a person born with watery umbilical cord when freshly cut immediately after birth.

== People ==
- Dennis Okot (born 1990), Ugandan footballer
- Josephine Okot (born 1970), Ugandan businesswoman
- Kal Okot (born 1990), Ugandan-English footballer
- Mike Okot (born 1958), Ugandan sprinter
- Santa Okot, Ugandan politician
- Okot Odhiambo (died 2013), Ugandan rebel; senior leader of the Lord's Resistance Army
- Okot p'Bitek (1931–1982), Ugandan poet

== Other uses ==
- Okot River, Uganda
- Okot, a forest god in the mythology of the Bicolano people of the Philippines
