= Nahia (given name) =

Female given name

- Pronunciation: /ˈnɑːiːɑː/
- Gender: Female

Origin
- Origin: Basque
- Meaning: aspiration, wish, desire
- Region of origin: Basque Country, Spain

Other names
- Variant forms: Naia; Nahikari; Gure

Nahia is a Basque feminine given name meaning "aspiration", "wish", or "desire".

== Usage ==
The Basque Statistics Office cited it as the 5th most popular given name for baby girls born in the Basque Country between 2010 and 2012. Outside the Basque Country, specially in Spain, the name of Naia is a more frequent given name and while in Spanish they are pronounced similarly, they have different etymologies; Naia has instead a Greek mythological origin.

== People ==
- Nahia Berecoechea (born 2004), French tennis player
- Nahia Zudaire Borrezo (born 2004), Spanish Paralympic swimmer
