= Yadira =

Yadira is a given name. Notable people with the given name include:

- Yadira Bendaña (born 1968), Honduran journalist and politician
- Yadira Caraveo (born 1980), American politician
- Yadira Geara (born 1986), Dominican beauty queen and former tennis player
- Yadira Guamán (born 1986), Ecuadoran race walker
- Yadira Guevara-Prip, American television actor
- Yadira Henríquez (born 1958), Dominican attorney and politician
- Yadira Lira (born 1973), Mexican athlete and coach
- Yadira Narváez (born 1985), Colombian serial killer
- Yadira Pascault Orozco, French-Mexican actress and producer
- Yadira Santiago Marcos, Mexican politician who served in the Congress of the Union 2018-2024
- Yadira Serrano Crespo (born 1976), Mexican politician
- Yadira Silva (born 1985), Cuban-born Mexican table tennis player
- Yadira Soturno (born 1970), Venezuelan paralympic athlete
