= Ndeye =

Ndeye, Ndèye or N'deye is a Senegalese feminine given name. Notable people with the name include:

== N'deye ==
- N'Deye Binta Dia (born 1973), Senegalese sprinter
- N'Deye Tabar Fall, Mauritanian politician
- N'deye Mareame Sarr (died 2001), German murder victim

== Ndeye and Ndèye ==
- Ndeye Awa Diakhaté (born 1997), Senegalese footballer
- Ndèye Coumba Mbengue Diakhaté (1924–2001), Senegalese educator and poet
- Ndeye Dieng (born 1994), Senegalese basketball player
- Ndèye Binta Diongue (born 1988), Senegalese fencer
- Ndèye Tické Ndiaye Diop, Senegalese politician and engineer
- Ndèye Fatou Kane (born 1986), Senegalese novelist
- Ndèye Ndiaye (born 1979), Senegalese basketball player
- Adja Ndeye Boury Ndiaye (born 1936), Senegalese writer
- Ndèye Fatou Ndiaye (born 1994), Senegalese basketball player
- Ndéye Séne (born 1988), Senegalese basketball player
- Ndèye Fatou Soumah (born 1986), Senegalese sprinter
