= Sani (given name) =

Sani is a given name. Notable people with the name include:

- Sani Abacha (1943–1998), Nigerian military officer and politician
- Sani Ahmed, Nigerian basketball coach
- Sani Ibrahim Azar (born 1961), Palestinian Lutheran bishop
- Sani Bečirovič (born 1981), Slovenian basketball player and coach
- Sani Bello (born 1942), Nigerian political leader and military administrator
- Sani Dangote (c. 1959–2021), Nigerian businessperson
- Sani Daura, Nigerian Federal Minister
- Sani Daura Ahmed, Nigerian Governor of Yobe State
- Sani Emmanuel (born 1992), Nigerian footballer
- Sani Rizki Fauzi (born 1998), Indonesian footballer
- Sani Yahaya Jingir, Nigerian Islamic scholar
- Sani Kaita (born 1986), Nigerian footballer
- Sani Anuar Kamsani, Malaysian footballer
- Sani Lakatani (born 1936), former Premier of Niue
- Sani Lulu (born 1958), former president of the Nigeria Football Federation
- Sani Maikatanga (born 1975), Nigerian photographer
- Sani Mohammed, Nigerian politician
- Sani al Mulk (Abu'l-Hasan) (1814–1866), Iranian painter and book illustrator
- Sani Musa (born 1965), Nigerian politician
- Sani Musa Danja (born 1973), Nigerian actor, producer, and director
- Sani Ndanusa (born 1957), Nigerian former Minister of Youths, Sports and Social Development
- Sani Rambi (born 1958), Papua New Guinean politician
- Sani Rifati, Yugoslavia-born Romani human rights activist
- Sani Sha'aban (born 1958), Nigerian politician and businessperson
- Sani Abdullahi Shinkafi, Nigerian politician
- Sani Shuwaram, Daesh terrorist
- Sani Şener (born 1955), Turkish construction magnate
- Sani Yakubu Rodi (1975 or 1981–2002), Nigerian prisoner executed under Sharia law
- Sani Yaya, Togolese politician
- Sani, Finnish singer Saija Aartela of Aikakone
