= Eline =

Eline is a given name. Notable people with the name include:

- Eline Arbo (born 1986), Norwegian theatre director and playwright
- Eline Berings (born 1986), Belgian athlete who competes in the 100 m hurdles
- Eline Eriksen (1881–1963), wife of Edvard Eriksen, model for the Little Mermaid statue in Copenhagen, Denmark
- Eline Flipse (born 1954), film director of documentaries
- Eline Heger, née Schmidt (1774–1842), Danish stage actress and ballet dancer
- Eline Jurg (born 1973), Dutch bobsledder
- Eline Nygaard Riisnæs (1913–2011), Norwegian pianist
- Marie Eline (1902–1981), American silent film child actress and sister of Grace Eline

== See also ==
- Cyclone Leon–Eline, long-lived Indian Ocean tropical cyclone
- Eline Vere (film), 1991 Dutch film directed by Harry Kümel, based on the 1889 novel by Louis Couperus
