= Ilenia =

Ilenia is an Italian feminine given name of uncertain origin. It might be an elaboration of the name Elena.

== Women ==
- Ilenia Draisci (born 1989), Italian sprinter
- Ilenia Lazzarin (born 1982), Italian actress
- Ilenia Pastorelli (born 1985), Italian actress
- Ilenia Sims (born 2002), English-Italian cricketer
