= Manaaki =

Manaaki is a given name. Notable people with the name include:

- Arnold Manaaki Wilson (1928–2012), New Zealand painter
- Manaaki Selby-Rickit (born 1996), New Zealand rugby union player

== See also ==
- Manaaki Whenua, New Zealand research institute
