= Croía =

Female given name

- Pronunciation: /ˈkriːə/ KREE-ə
- Gender: Female
- Language: Irish

Croía (also Croíadh; both /ˈkriːə/), are feminine given names derived from the Irish word croí meaning "heart". Croía by 2023 had risen to 23rd most popular girl's name in the Republic of Ireland, and 59th in Northern Ireland. Isolated instances (one or two babies per annum registered with the name) were noted by NISRA (Northern Ireland Statistics and Research Agency) in 1998 (Croia), 2004 (Croiagh), 2005, 2016, and 2017 (Croiadh). (Note: NISRA statistics do not take note of the síneadh fada, so í appears as i.) The first year in which the Central Statistics Office recorded more than three babies registered with either name in the Republic was 2018. Maitiú Ó Coimín comments that Croía and its variants are not Irish words, and that the root word Croí has also been used occasionally as a name (7 boys and 3 girls in 2019).

Many friends of Ross O'Carroll-Kelly's wife Sorcha are given extravagantly Irish names to satirise a certain middle-class view of Irishness; a 2018 column featured one named Croia who found Sorcha's Guys and Dolls fancy-dress theme gender binarist. Conor McGregor's daughter born in January 2019 was named Croía, which Her.ie at the time described as "unique"; later commentators have suggested McGregor's choice might have helped its subsequent increased popularity.

Frequency of Croía and Croíadh in Ireland (Note: As a name for females registered as born in a given year. Rep = Republic of Ireland; NI = Northern Ireland)
Name→	Croía				Croíadh			
↓Year	Count		Rank		Count		Rank	
↓Year	Rep	NI	Rep	NI	Rep	NI	Rep	NI
2023	166	36	23	59	13	9	296	193
2022	140	33	38	64	16	6	266	266
2021	116	19	52	123	27	1–2	177	>446
2020	56	4	95	333	16	1–2	264	>397
2019	32	4	162	336	12	5	347	298
2018	18	0	255	—	11	1–2	387	>434
