= Rawiri =

Rawiri is both a given name and a surname. In the Māori language, it is a transliteration of the name David. Notable people with the name include:

== Surname ==
- Angèle Rawiri (1954–2010), Gabonese novelist
- Georges Rawiri (1932–2006), Gabonese politician, diplomat, and poet

== Given name ==
- Rawiri Paratene (born 1953 or 1954), New Zealand actor, director, and writer
- Rawiri Puhirake (died 1864), New Zealand tribal leader
- Rawiri Taiwhanga (fl. 1818–1874), New Zealand tribal leader, farmer, Anglican missionary and teacher
- Rawiri Tareahi (died 1850s), New Zealand tribal leader
- Rawiri Waititi (born 1980 or 1981), New Zealand politician
