= Odalis =

Odalis or Odalys is a given name which may refer to:

== People ==
- Odalys Adams (born 1966), Cuban former hurdler
- Odalys García (born 1975), Cuban actress, model, singer and show host
- Odalis Pérez (born 1977), former Major League Baseball pitcher from the Dominican Republic
- Odalis Revé (born 1970), Cuban former judoka, 1992 Olympic middleweight champion

== Other uses ==
- Tropical Storm Odalys (disambiguation), various tropical storms
