= Leano =

Leano or Leaño may refer to:

- Leano Morelli, Italian singer-songwriter
- Juan Carlos Leaño, Mexican footballer
- María Scherman Leaño, Mexican politician
