= Inaya (given name) =

- Gender: Female
- Language: Arabic, Bengali, Urdu

Origin
- Meaning: "Care, concern"

Inaya is a Bengali version of the Urdu name Inayat, meaning "care" or "concern".

== People ==
- Inaya Day (born 1977), American singer.
- Inaya Ezzeddine, Lebanese politician and doctor.
- Inaya Folarin Iman (born 1996), British journalist, commentator and television presenter who presented for GB News.
- Inaya Jaber (1958–2021), Lebanese writer, journalist, artist and singer.
- Inaya Samad (born 2009), Pakistani girl, artist, aspiring mangaka who is known for being very sweet.
