= Dunja =

- Gender: Female
- Language: South Slavic
- Name day: September 4 (Croatia)

Origin
- Meaning: quince
- Region of origin: Southeast Europe

Dunja (Serbian Cyrillic: Дуња) is a Serbo-Croatian feminine given name which is in fact homonymous with the vocabulary word for "quince." It derives from the Greek name of Eudoxia, which means "good fame or judgement". It is a popular name in Serbia, Croatia, and Bosnia. Notable people with the name include:

- Dunja Hayali (born 1974), German journalist and television presenter
- Dunja Ilić (born 1990), Serbian pop singer, songwriter and composer
- Dunja Knebl (born 1946), Croatian acoustic/folk singer
- Dunja Kreiser (born 1971), German politician
- Dunja Mijatović, Bosnian expert on media law and media regulation
- Dunja Rajter (born 1946), Croatian actress and singer
- Dunja Vejzović (born 1943), Croatian opera singer
- Dunja Wolff (born 1962), German politician

== See also ==
- Dunya
