= Pipaluk =

Female given name

Pipaluk is a Greenlandic Inuit feminine given name meaning "sweet little thing". It was the second most popular given name for girls in Greenland during the past decade and was the fifth most popular name for girls born in Greenland between 1990 and 1999. In the period 1940–1950 the name was used in Denmark for a sort of hood, often red, worn by little girls during wintertime.

== Persons ==
- Pipaluk Freuchen (1918–1999), writer
- Pipaluk Lynge-Rasmussen (born 1984), politician

== Polar bear ==
- Pipaluk (died 1990), the first male polar bear born in captivity in Britain - see List of individual bears
