= Mariama =

Name list

Mariama is a female name. It may refer to:

- Mariama Bâ (1929–1981), Senegalese author and feminist
- Mariama Gaye (born 1993), Gambian-Swedish model
- Mariama Barry, Senegalese novelist
- Mariama Sonah Bah (born 1978), Guinean judoka
- Mariama Souley Bana (born 1987), Nigerien swimmer
- Mariama Dalanda Barry (born 1991), Guinean taekwondo practitioner
- Mariama Gamatié Bayard (born 1958), Nigerien politician and women's rights activist
- Mariama Camara (died 2025), Guinean politician and businesswoman
- Mariama Colley (born 1988), Gambian radio personality, human rights activist and actress
- Mariama Kesso Diallo, Guinean writer living in Switzerland
- Mariama Goodman (born 1977), English dancer and singer who has been a member of the bands Solid HarmoniE and the Honeyz.
- Mariama Hima (born 1951), Nigerien film director, ethnologist and politician
- Mariama Mamoudou Ittatou (born 1997), Nigerien sprinter
- Mariama Jalloh, (born 1986), Sierra Leonean singer–songwriter established in France
- Mariama Jamanka (born 1990), German bobsledder
- Mariama Keïta (1946-2018), Niger's first woman journalist and feminist activist
- Mariama Khan (born 1977), Gambian filmmaker, poet, cultural activist and scholar
- Mariama Ndoye (born 1953), Senegalese writer
- Mariama Ouiminga (born 1970), Burkinabé sprinter
- Mariama Owusu (born 1954), Ghanaian jurist
- Mariama Sarr (born 1963), Senegalese politician
- Mariama Signaté (born 1985), Senegalese-French handball player
- Mariama Sow (born 2000), Guinean swimmer
- Mariama White-Hammond, African-American minister

== See also ==
- Elea-Mariama Diarra (born 1990), French athlete
- Maryam/Mariam
