= Jovana =

Jovana is a Serbian feminine name. People with the name include:

- Jovana Brakočević, Serbian volleyball player
- Jovana Crnogorac, Serbian cyclist
- Jovana Damnjanović, Serbian football player
- Jovana Jakšić, Serbian tennis player
- Jovana Janković, Serbian television presenter
- Jovana Jovović, Serbian handball player
- Jovana Karakašević, Serbian basketball player
- Jovana Kocić (born 1998), Serbian volleyball player
- Jovana Kovačević, Serbian handball player
- Jovana Marjanović, Serbian beauty pageant
- Jovana Marović, Montenegrin politician
- Jovana Mrkić, Montenegrin football player
- Jovana Nogić, Serbian basketball player
- Jovana Pašić, Montenegrin basketball player
- Jovana Petrović Serbian women's football goalkeeper
- Jovana Popović, Serbian basketball player
- Jovana Preković, Serbian karateka, Olympic champion
- Jovana Rad, Serbian basketball player
- Jovana Rapport, Serbian chess player
- Jovana Rogić, Serbian judoka
- Jovana Risović, Serbian handball player
- Jovana Sretenović, Serbian football player
- Jovana Stevanović, Serbian volleyball player
- Jovana Stoiljković, Serbian handball player
- Jovana Terzić, Montenegrin swimmer
- Jovana Vesović, Serbian volleyball player
