= Miran (name) =

- Gender: Male and female

Other gender
- Feminine: Mira, Mirna

Origin
- Origin: Slavic, Iranian
- Meaning: Peace/calm, universe/world, princely, illusion

Other names
- Related names: Miroslav, Miren, Mirko, Mi-ran

Miran is a given name and surname. The name Miran is derived from the word Mir (eng. peace) and the suffix 'an' which is a very common component of Slavic names. (Keber, Janez, Leksikon imen (COBISS))

== Miran (given name) ==
Miran is a male given name used primarily in several Slavic countries, most notably in Slovenia and Croatia.

According to the Statistical Office of the Republic of Slovenia, as of 31 December 2007, there were 5,533 men named Miran in Slovenia, making it the 46th most frequent male given name in the country.

In Croatia, Miran is also used as a male given name, almost exclusively among ethnic Croats. According to Acta Croatica, it is a relatively common name—ranking among the top thousand male names—with over five hundred bearers nationwide.

The name Miran also appears in Bosnia and Herzegovina and Serbia, although it is less common in those countries.

=== Meaning and usage ===
The name means "calm" in both Slovenian and Bosnian-Croatian-Serbian.

In Slovenian name calendars, the name Miran is listed together with Friderik, Irenej, and Miroslav.

The feminine forms of the name in the Balkans are Mira and Mirna, both carrying the same meaning.

According to the Catholic calendar, people named Miran celebrate their name day on May 9.

The name is also common among Turks, Iranians (such as Kurds), and Pakistanis, where it means "princely," similar to Emir and Mirza, which are also popular names in these cultures.

Additionally, the name is used among Japanese people, particularly Japanese women, where it means "illusion."

== Given name ==
=== Males ===
- Miran Jarc (1900–1942), Slovenian writer
- Miran Edgar Thompson (1907–1991), American prisoner of Alcatraz
- Miran Ogrin (1914–1985), Slovene journalist
- Miran Bakhsh (1907–1991), Pakistani cricketer
- Miran Božovič (born 1957), Slovenian philosopher
- Miran Burgić (born 1984), Slovenian footballer
- Miran Hladnik (born 1954), Slovenian literary historian
- Miran Hrovatin (1949–1994), Italian Slovene photographer
- Miran Tepeš (born 1961, Ljubljana, SR Slovenia/Yugoslavia), former ski jumper and current ski jumping official
- Miran Khesro (born 1989), Iraqi Kurdistan footballer
- Miran Krmelj (1941–2009), Yugoslav ice hockey defender
- Miran Kurspahić (born 1979, Zagreb, SR Croatia/Yugoslavia), Croatian actor
- Miran Ravter (born 1972), Slovenian alpine skier
- Miran Shah (1366–1408), Timurid Empire governor
- Miran Srebrnič (born 1970), Slovenian football defender
- Miran Vodovnik (born 1977), Slovenian shot putter
- Miran Pogačar (born 1988 Drvar, SR Bosnia and Herzegovina/Yugoslavia) civil rights activist in Serbia

=== Females ===
- Miran Nohara (born 2003), Japanese shogi player

== Nickname ==
- Richard Garcia Miranda (born 1975), Brazilian footballer

== Surname ==
- Mahmoud Miran (born 1974), Iranian judo practitioner
- Stephen Miran (born 1984), American economist
