= Willow (given name) =

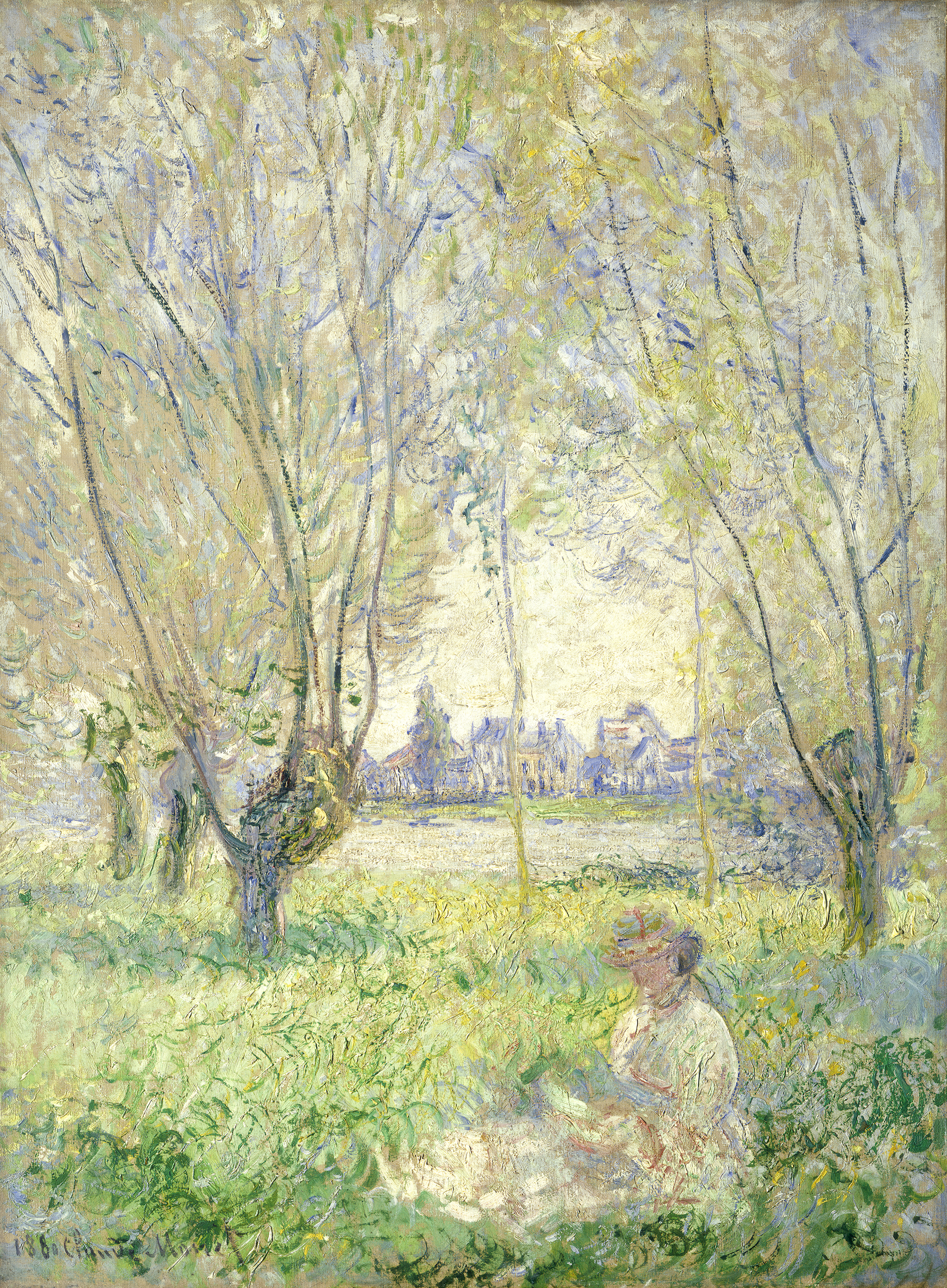
- Woman seated under the willows by Claude Monet
- Gender: female
- Language: English

Origin
- Meaning: English botanical name taken from the name of the tree

Willow is a given name used in reference to the willow. It has grown in popularity in English speaking countries along with other names inspired by the natural world. It first entered the top 1,000 names given to American newborn girls in 2000 and was ranked in 37th position for American baby girls in 2022. It was among the top 10 most popular names for girls born in Wales in 2020. It was also among the top 10 names for girls born in New Zealand in 2020.

Notable people with the name include:

- Willow Bay (born 1963), American model and journalist
- Willow Dawson (fl. 1990s–2010s), Canadian cartoonist and illustrator
- Willow Geer (born 1981), American actress
- Willow Hand (born 1998), American fashion model
- Willow Johnson, Canadian voice actress
- Willow Koerber (born 1977), American professional cross-country mountain biker
- Willow Macky (1921–2006), New Zealand songwriter
- Willow Pill (born 1995), American drag performer
- Willow Sage Hart (born 2011) American singer
- Willow Shields (born 2000), American actress
- Willow Smith (born 2000), American singer, actress, and dancer

Other uses of the name include:

Other uses of the name include:

- Willow Rosenberg, character in the fantasy television series Buffy the Vampire Slayer (1997–2003)
- Willow Harris, character from the Australian television soap opera Home and Away (2017–2021)
- Willow Nightingale, the ring name of professional wrestler Danielle Paultre
- Willow, a western crowned pigeon in Angry Birds Stella and The Angry Birds Movie
- Willow Ufgood, title character from the 1988 movie Willow and the 2022 Disney+ TV series
- Willow Schnee, a character in the animated web series RWBY
- Willow Park, a character in the animated series The Owl House (2020–2023)
- Willow, a character from the mobile game Brawl Stars
- Willow, a character from the video game Don't Starve
