= Dariel (given name) =

Given name

- Gender: Unisex
- Language: English, Spanish

Origin
- Meaning: Uncertain

Other names
- Related names: Darell, Dariela, Darielle, Darielis, Dariella, Darielly, Dariely, Darielys, Darrell, Darrielle, Daryl

Dariel is a unisex given name of uncertain etymology. It might be a variant of the name Darell combined with the ending -iel found in names such as Daniel. It is currently a popular name for boys among Spanish speakers in North America.

Dariel is also in use as a feminine given name. It was the name of the heroine of Dariel: A Romance of Surrey, an 1897 adventure novel by English novelist R. D. Blackmore.

== Men ==
- Dariel Albo (born 1992), Cuban volleyball player
- Dariel Álvarez (born 1988), Cuban professional baseball right fielder
- Dariel Fitzkee, pen name of American magician and writer Dariel Fitzroy (1898-1977)
- Dariel Morejón (born 1998), Cuban football player
- Iván Dariel Ortiz, Puerto Rican film director

== Women ==
- Dariel Pertwee (born 1961), British actress
