= Benicio =

Benicio is both a given name of Spanish origin, cognate to Benedict, and a surname.

== Notable people ==
=== Given name ===
- Benicio Baker-Boaitey (born 2004), Ghanaian footballer
- Benicio del Toro (born 1967), Puerto Rican actor and producer

=== Surname ===
- Benício, pen name of José Luiz Benício da Fonseca (1936–2021), a Brazilian illustrator and designer
- Cauê Benicio (born 1978), Brazilian footballer
- Mônica Benício (born 1986), Brazilian architect
- Murilo Benício (born 1972), Brazilian actor

== See also ==
- Philip Benizi de Damiani, also known as Felipe Benicio
