= Bisera =

- Gender: Female
- Language: South Slavic

Origin
- Meaning: Pearl
- Region of origin: Bosnia and Herzegovina, Bulgaria, North Macedonia, Serbia

Bisera is a feminine given name and surname of South Slavic origin meaning pearl. It is used in Bulgaria, Bosnia and Herzegovina, North Macedonia, Serbia, and other Slavic countries. Notable people with the name include:

== Given name ==
- Bisera Alikadić (1939–2026), Bosnian poet and author
- Bisera Turković (born 1954), Bosnian diplomat and politician
- Bisera Veletanlić (born 1942), Serbian jazz singer

== Surname ==
- Olga Bisera (born 1944), Yugoslav-born Italian film actress and producer
