= Nelia (given name) =

Nelia is a feminine given name. It originated as a short form of Cornelia or Kornelia.

== Women ==
- Nélia Barbosa (born 1998), French paracanoeist
- Nelia Martins (born 1998), East Timorese Olympic middle distance runner
- Nelia Penman (1915-2017), British politician and barrister
- Nelia Sancho (1951-2022), Filipina women's rights activist and beauty queen
