= Inuk (given name) =

Origin
- Origin: Greenlandic Inuit
- Meaning: “human being”

Inuk is a Greenlandic Inuit given name meaning “human being.” It is used for both males and females but has been a popular name for boys in Greenland in recent years.

== People ==
- Inuk Silis Høegh, Greenlandic artist and film maker.
