= Pradip =

Pradip is a given name of Indian origin. Pradip means Light, Shine, Lamp, Brilliant, One who is like a light or a lantern. People with that name include:

- Pradip Baijal, retired officer of the Indian Administrative Service
- Pradip Bhattacharya (born 1945), Indian politician from West Bengal
- Pradip Chatterjee, founder member of the Bengali band Moheener Ghoraguli
- Pradip Krishen, Indian film director, naturalist, eco-botanist and environmentalist
- Pradip Kumar Banerjee (born 1936), Indian football player
- Pradip Kumar Barma, Indian politician
- Pradip Somasundaran (born 1967), playback singer and a lecturer in Electronics from Kerala, India
