= Ibai (given name) =

Ibai is a Basque male name.

Notable people with the name include:

- Ibai Llanos (born 1995), Spanish internet celebrity, streamer, and esports announcer, best known mononymously
- Ibai Aguirre (born 2007), Spanish footballer
- Ibai Azurmendi (born 1999), Spanish cyclist
- Ibai Gómez (born 1989), Spanish footballer
- Ibai Salas (born 1991), Spanish cyclist
- Ibai Sanz (born 2003), Spanish footballer
