= Ivaana (given name) =

Female given name

- Gender: Female

Origin
- Origin: Greenlandic Inuit
- Meaning: “brood egg”

Other names
- See also: Ivaasaq, Ivalimaaq, Ivâĸ, Ivâna, Ivaneĸ, Ivâraĸ.

Ivaana is a Greenlandic Inuit feminine given name. It is a combination of the Greenlandic name Ivek, meaning “brood egg,” and the Greenlandic name ending -na that indicates a first name. It has been a popular name for girls in Greenland in recent years.
