= Nida (name) =

Nida is a unisex given name and a surname. In Arabic it means call, sound, and voice and is used as a feminine given name.

Notable people with the name include:

== Given name ==
=== Female ===
- Nida Allam (born 1993), American politician
- Nida Dar (born 1987), Pakistani cricketer
- Nida Karasakal, Turkish weightlifter
- Nida Khan, Indian women's rights activist
- Nida Khuhro, Pakistani politician
- Nida Manzoor, British television writer and director
- Nida Mumtaz (born 1960), Pakistani actress
- Nida Pasha, known as Nida Yasir, Pakistani actress
- Nida Patcharaveerapong (1984–2022), Thai actress
- H. Nida Sen, Turkish ophthalmologist
- Nida Senff (1920–1995), Dutch swimmer
- Nida Eliz Üstündağ (born 1996), Turkish swimmer
- Nida Vasiliauskaitė (born 1975), Lithuanian philosopher
- Nida Waseem (born 1982), Pakistani tennis player
- Nida Zuhal (born 1975), Turkish swimmer

=== Male ===
- Nida Fazli (1938–2016), Indian poet and lyricist
- Nida Sinnokrot (born 1971), Palestinian-American artist
- Nida Tüfekçi (1929–1993), Turkish folk music artist

== Surname ==
- Eugene Nida (1914–2011), American linguistics and translation scholar
- Julian Nida-Rümelin (born 1954), German philosopher
- Martine Nida-Rümelin (born 1957), German philosopher
- Norman Von Nida (1914–2007), Australian professional golfer

== Other ==
- Nida Blanca, stage name of Dorothy Guinto Jones (1936–2001), Filipino actress and comedian
- Nida Boga, nickname of Leonida T. Boga (1886–1974), Aromanian writer, schoolteacher and archivist in Romania
