= Layan =

Arabic feminine given name

Layan (Arabic: ليان) is a feminine Arabic given name meaning "prosperity life", "soft, gentle." Leen (Arabic: لين) is a related name. Both are among the most popular names given to newborn girls in the Arab world in the past decade.

Variants of the name are also in use in the United States and other Western countries, often translated with different spellings. Other related Arabic names that are common in Western countries as well include Lina (Arabic: لينا), Leena and Lena, all relating to the meaning "tender" or "soft." All three names also can take their origin from other languages.
