= Akissi =

Akissi is a given name. Notable people with the name include:

- Akissi Delta (born 1960), Ivorian actress
- Akissi Kouamé (1955–2022), Ivorian army officer
- Akissi Kpidi (born 1964), Ivorian sprinter
- Akissi Monney (born 1979), Ivorian judoka
