= Fiadh =

Given name

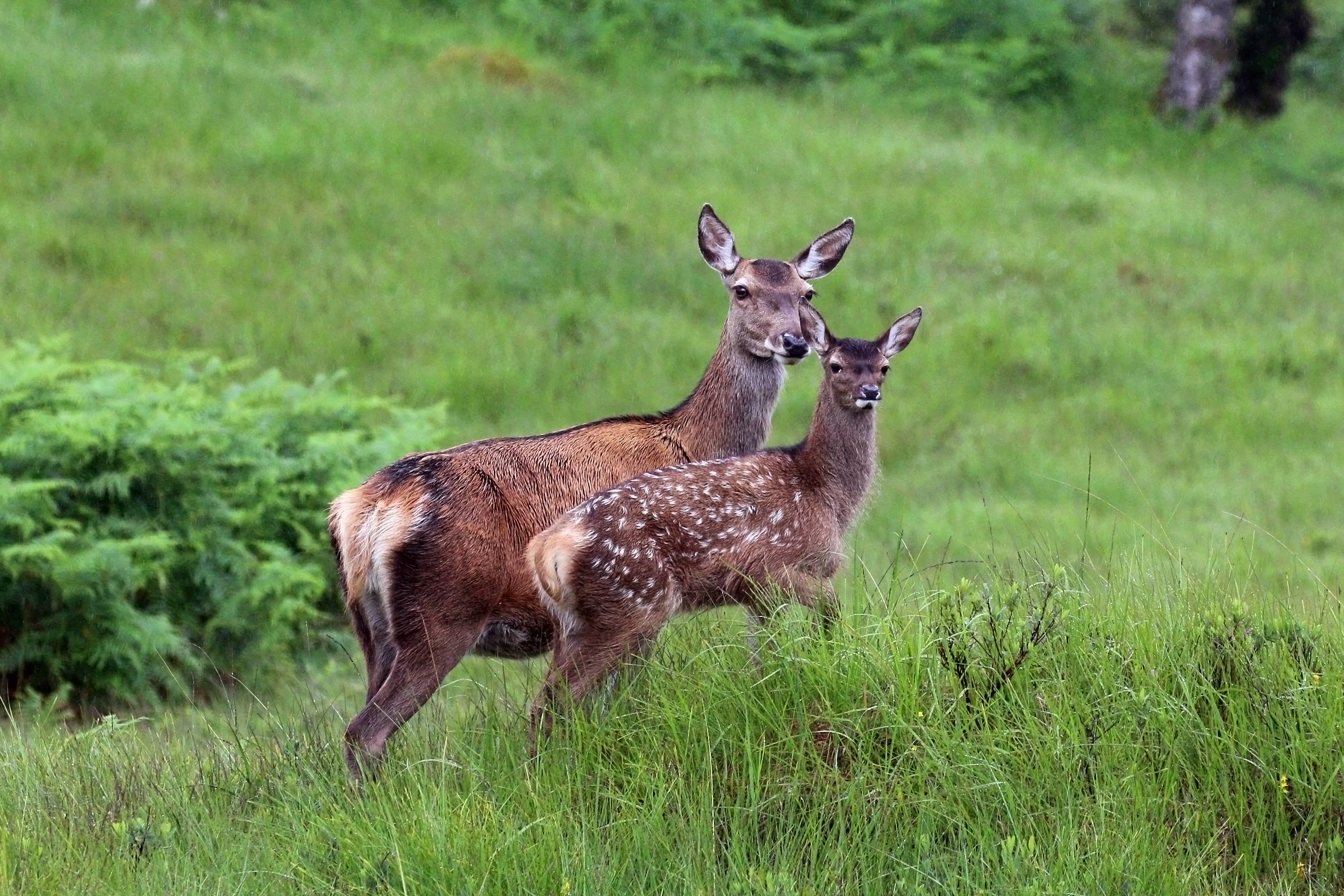
- Red deer in Scotland
- Pronunciation: /ˈfiːə/ FEE-ə; Irish: [fʲiə]
- Gender: Female
- Language: Irish, Scottish

Origin
- Meaning: deer, wild

Fiadh is an Irish/Scottish feminine given name. In Irish, it is an archaic variant of fia meaning "wild" or "wild game", especially "deer", or—via another etymology—"respect".

== Origins ==
Fiadh derives from Old Irish fiad meaning "wild" and "wild game", particularly "deer". Its Proto-Indo-European root is believed to have separately developed into the English words wood and divide. It was largely unknown as a given name until the end of the 20th century, although it was known in the contexts of deer and the ancient fulacht fiadh mounds.

Irish given names for children experienced a spike in popularity after Vatican II when societal and parochial pressure to give saints' names to children was eased. Many of the Irish language origin names which were popular in the 1960s and 1970s (such as Sinéad, Deirdre or Emer) were out of fashion by the end of the century after reaching critical mass. Fiadh was part of a subsequent wave of names that became popular in the post Celtic Tiger period when the Irish language was perceived to have more social cachet.

== Popularity ==
The Central Statistics Office (CSO) record of births registered in the Republic of Ireland noted the first instance of Fiadh in 1994, with three more in 2002. This had multiplied tenfold by 2011. The name entered the national top ten for feminine given names by 2018 and became most popular for the first time in 2021.

The CSO reported that Fiadh was the third highest ranked baby name for girls in 2022 with 320 registrations. A further 79 instances of the accented form Fíadh were registered. Since 2018, the CSO has a policy of counting accented variations as separate names. When taken together, the total number of registrations for Fiadh and Fíadh was 399, exceeding the total registrations of the most popular name for baby girls in 2022, Emily, at 349.

Met Éireann proposed Fíadh as a storm name for the 2025–26 European windstorm season but, as the UK Met Office expressed concern that it sounded too like some British English pronunciations of fear, the name was changed to Fionnuala.

== See also ==
- List of Irish-language given names
