= Sharmin =

Sharmin may refer to the following people:

== Given name ==
- Sharmin Akhter (born 1995), Bangladeshi cricketer
- Sharmin Ali (born 1988), Indian author and entrepreneur
- Sharmin Meymandi Nejad (born 1970), Iranian writer
- Sharmin Ratna (born 1988), Bangladeshi sports shooter
- Sharmin Rima (died 1989), a woman murdered by her husband
- Sharmin Segal, Indian actress
- Sharmin Sultana Rima, Bangladeshi kabaddi player
- Sharmin Sultana Shirin (born 1989), Bangladesh chess player

== Surname ==
- Shaila Sharmin (born 1989), Bangladeshi cricketer
