= Patience (given name) =

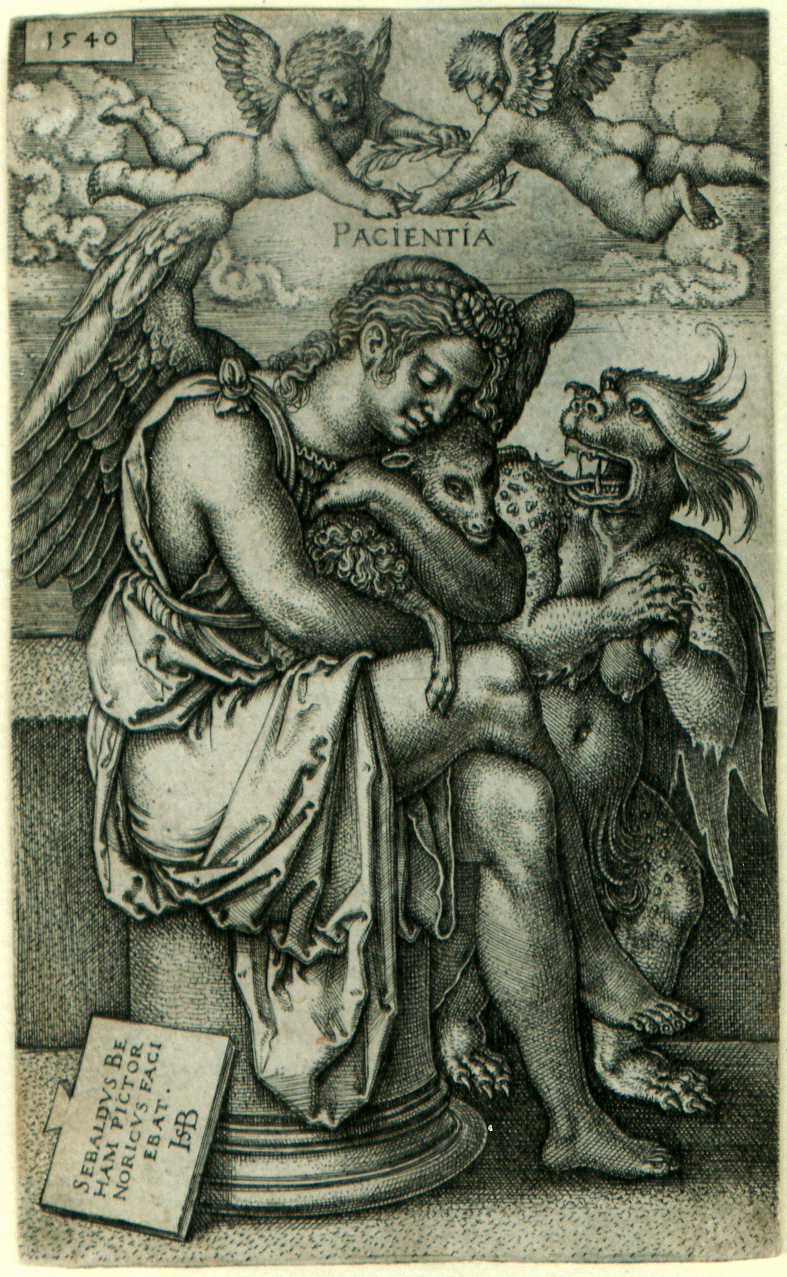
- "Patience," a 1540 engraving by Hans Sebald Beham
- Pronunciation: PAY-shens
- Gender: female

Origin
- Origin: English via Latin patientia
- Meaning: "patience"

Patience is an English feminine given name referring to the virtue of patience. It was a name created by the Puritans in the 1600s.

It has seen steady, though infrequent, usage in the United States throughout its history. The name has ranked among the top 1,000 names given to newborn girls in the United States since 1994, when it returned to the top 1,000 for the first time since 1894. In 2011, it was the 843rd most popular name given to newborn American girls.

== People with the given name ==
- Patience Agbabi (born 1965), English poet and writer
- Patience Collier (1910–1987), British actress
- Patience Cowie (1964–2020), British geologist
- Patience Dabany (born 1941), singer from Gabon
- Patience Hodgson, member of Australian band The Grates
- Patience McIntyre (born 1942), of Patience and Prudence, a 1950s singing duo
- Patience D. Roggensack (born 1940), former Chief Justice of the Wisconsin Supreme Court
- Patience Worth (1883–1937), author Pearl Lenore Curran's claimed source of spirit guidance

=== Fictional characters ===
- Patience St. Pim, a character in the Adventure Time miniseries "Elements"
