= Sienna (given name) =

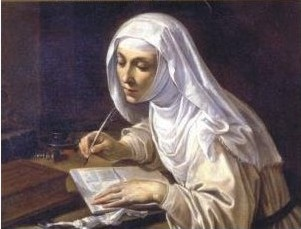
- Saint Catherine of Siena writing, by Rutilio di Lorenzo Manetti.
- Pronunciation: /siˈɛnə/ see-EN-ə
- Gender: female

Origin
- Origin: Italian
- Meaning: name of a city in Italy

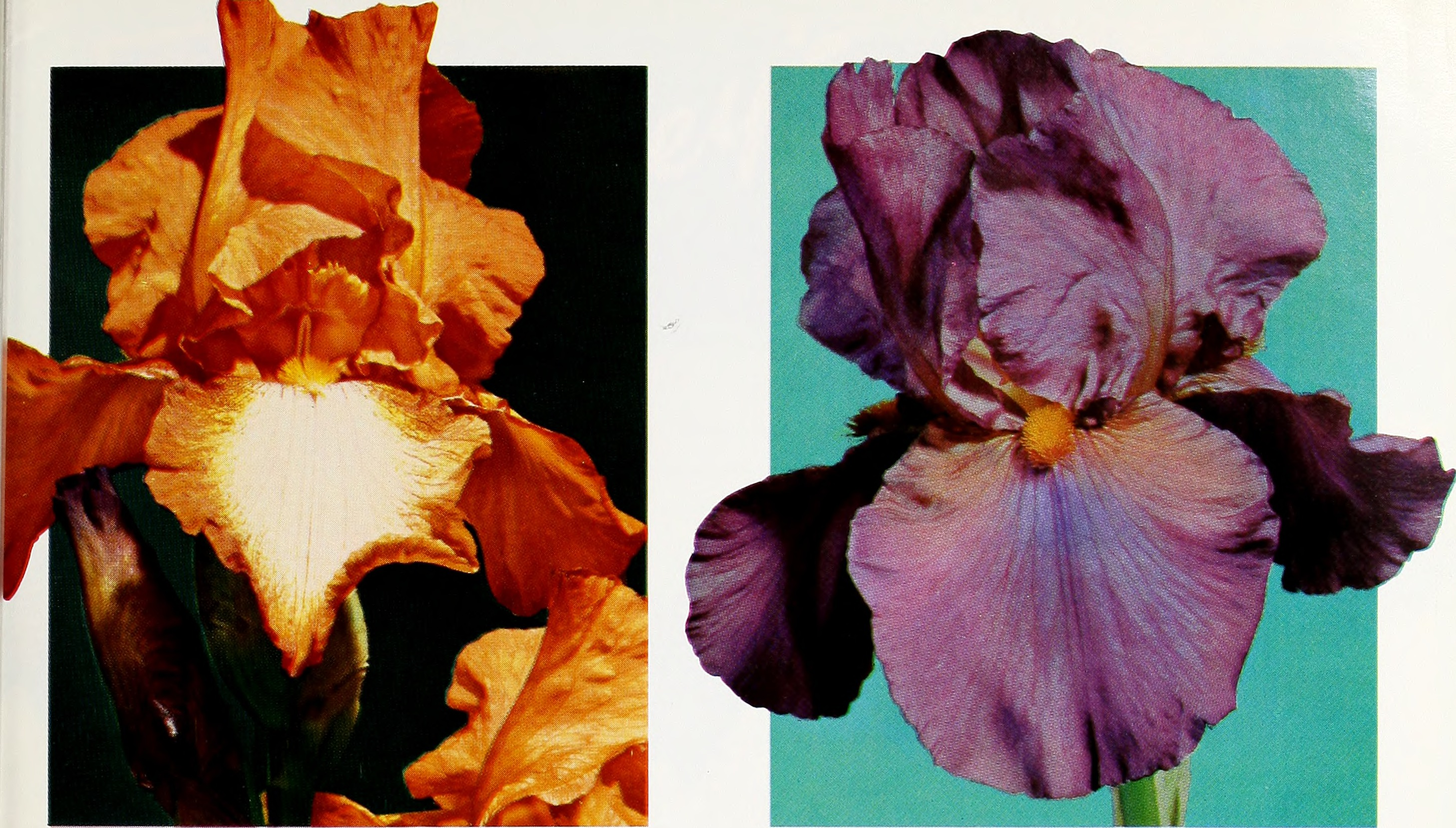
Irises of a burnt sienna color or with a burnt sienna-colored center.

Sienna or Siena is a feminine given name of Italian origin and unclear meaning. The original usage of the name is derived from the Italian city and may also refer to the burnt orange color of its clay rooftops. Roman Catholics have sometimes used the name in honor of Saint Catherine of Siena.

== Popularity ==
The name is currently well-used in English-speaking countries such as Great Britain, New Zealand, Australia, Canada and the United States. It is also well-used in France and the Netherlands, but not in Italy. Sienna is also the first name of the seventh great-granddaughter and twelfth great grandchild of Elizabeth II born in 2021.

== Women ==
- Sienna Betts (born 2006), American basketball player
- Sienna Green (born 2004), Australian water polo Olympian
- Sienna Guillory (born 1975), British actress
- Sienna Miller (born 1981), British and American actress
- Sienna Morris (née Ceneri) (born 1983), American artist
- Sienna Rodgers, LabourList editor
- Sienna Shields (born 1976), American abstract artist specializing in large-format collage pieces
- Sienna Spiro (born 2005), English singer-songwriter

== As second name ==
- Jaclyn Sienna India, American entrepreneur and travel adviser

== Stage name ==
- Sienna (wrestler)

=== Characters ===
- Sienna Blake, a fictional character in UK soap opera Hollyoaks
- Sienna Cammeniti, a fictional character from the Australian soap opera Neighbours
- Sienna Matthews, a fictional character in the Australian television soap opera, Neighbours
- Sienna Shaw, a fictional character in the Terrifier franchise.
- Sienna, from the Papa Louie video games
