= Manaia =

Manaia may refer to:

- Manaia (mythological creature), a bird-headed mythological creature and symbol of protection in Māori mythology

== Places ==
- Manaia, Taranaki, a town in the South Taranaki District of New Zealand
- Manaia, Waikato, a town on the Coromandel Peninsula of New Zealand
- Manaia River, a river of the Coromandel Peninsula, New Zealand
- Mount Manaia is a landmark on the Whangarei Heads, Northland, New Zealand
  - Manaia View School, Whangarei, Northland, New Zealand

== People ==
- Manaia (legendary chief), a chief of Hawaiki in Māori mythology
- Wiremu Hukunui Manaia (died 1892), New Zealand tribal leader
- Manaia Cherrington (born 1994), New Zealand rugby league footballer
- Manaia Salavea (born 1986), Samoan rugby union footballer
