= Isla (given name) =

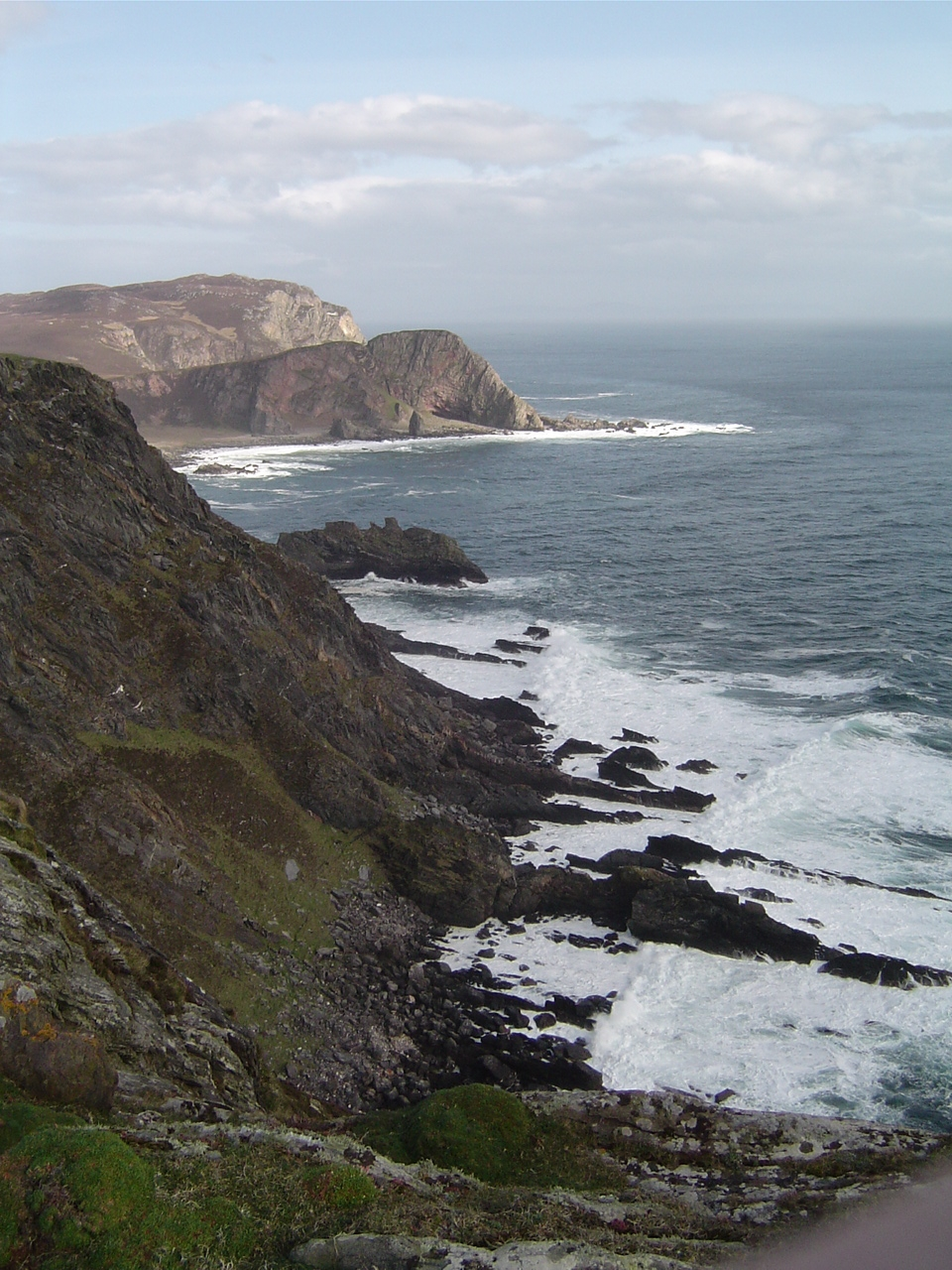
- The source of the name Isla: that of Islay, an island of the Inner Hebrides, Scotland
- Pronunciation: /ˈaɪlə/ EYE-lə
- Gender: Feminine

Origin
- Language: Scottish
- Region of origin: Great Britain or Spanish

Other names
- Related names: Isela, Islay, Aisla

Isla (/ˈaɪlə/ EYE-lə) is a feminine given name traditionally of primarily Scottish usage, derived from "Islay", which is the name of an island off the west coast of Scotland. It is also the name of two Scottish rivers. The root word has no known origin.

The name has increased in popularity in recent years in English-speaking countries.

The name in its original form was Ilay or Islay (e.g. Ilay Campbell), and it was a masculine given name, and was rare among women. Today Isla is regarded as a distinctly female name and Islay a rare male name. Other forms of the girl's name derived from alternate historical spellings of the Scottish island's name include Ile, Ila, and Eylah.

Notable people with the given name include:

- Isla Blair (born 1944), British actress
- Isla Blomfield (1865–1959), Australian nurse and sanitary inspector
- Isla Bryson, Scottish transgender criminal
- Isla Cameron (1927–1980), Scottish actress and singer
- Isla Dewar (1946–2021), Scottish novelist and screenwriter
- Isla Fisher (born 1976), Australian actress
- Isla St Clair (born 1952), Scottish actress and singer
- Isla Traquair (born 1980), Scottish broadcast journalist
