= Sadia (given name) =

Sadia is a feminine given name.

== List of people with the given name ==
- Sadia Khateeb, Indian actress and model
- Sadia Khan, Pakistani television and film actress
- Sadia Jahan Prova, Bangladeshi model and television actress
- Sadia Rashid (born 1946), Pakistani educationist
- Sadia Sheikh (died 2007), Pakistani murder victim
- Sadia Imam, Pakistani television presenter, actress and model
- Sadia Bashir, Pakistani computer scientist
- Sadia Ghaffar, Pakistani actress and model
- Sadia Olivier Bleu, Ivorian professional footballer
- Sadia Sadia, Canadian-born British installation artist
- Sadia Jabbar, Pakistani television and film producer; founder of Sadia Jabbar Production which was established in 2014
- Sadia Islam Mou, Bangladeshi model and television actress
- Sadia Nadeem Malik, Pakistani politician
- Sadia Azmat, British stand-up comedian
- Sadia Dehlvi, Indian writer

== See also ==
- Saadia (given name)
