= Nivi (given name) =

- Gender: Female

Origin
- Origin: Greenlandic Inuit
- Meaning: “girl”

Other names
- See also: Nive, Niviak, Niviaq.

Nivi is a Greenlandic Inuit feminine given name meaning "girl". It has been a popular name for girls in Greenland in recent years: in 2015 it was the most popular first given name. Another popular variant of the name is Niviaq.

People with the name include:

- Nivi Olsen, Greenlandic politician - see List of members of the Inatsisartut, 2025–2029
- Nivi Petersen, a member of the Greenland women's national handball team as of 2023
- Nivi Rosing (born 2003), Greenlandic politician
- Niviaq Korneliussen (born 1990), Greenlandic writer
