= Osian (name) =

Osian (Welsh pronunciation: [ˈɔʃan], English: /ˈɒʃən/ OSH-ən) is a Welsh masculine given name, derived from the Irish legendary poet and warrior Oisín. The name is derived from the Irish for "little deer". Osian was the 22nd most popular name for baby boys in Wales in 2017.

Notable people with the name include:

- Osian Ellis (1928–2021), Welsh harpist
- Osian Gwynedd, Welsh singer and keyboardist
- Osian Rhys Jones, Welsh poet
- Osian Morgan, Welsh actor
- Osian Owen, Welsh writer
- Osian Roberts (born 1965), Welsh footballer and football coach
