= Alma (given name) =

Female given name

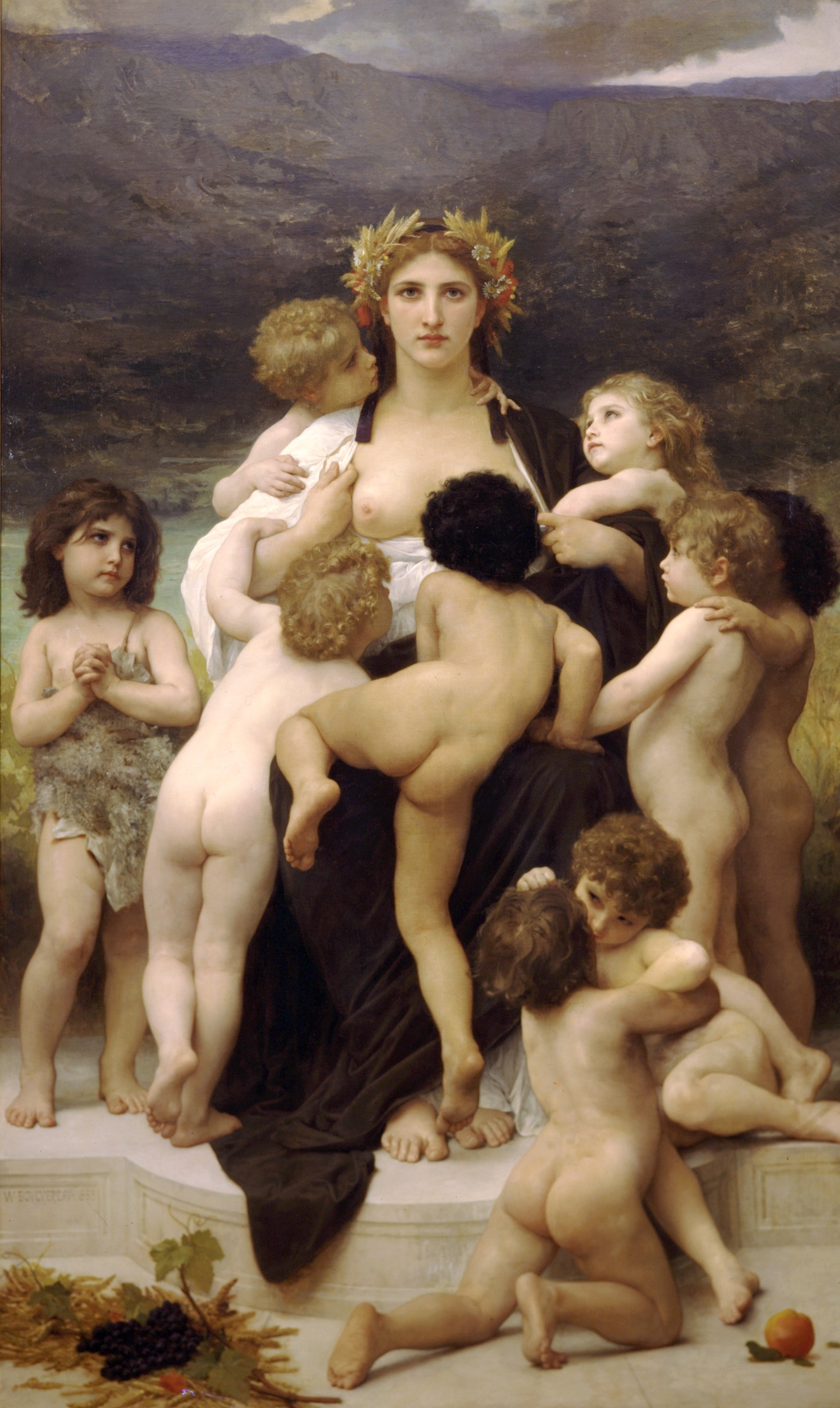
- Alma Parens, by William-Adolphe Bouguereau.
- Pronunciation: /'ælmə/
- Gender: Female
- Language: Latin, Hebrew

Origin
- Meaning: kind, nourishing

Other names
- Variant forms: Allma, Almah
- Short form: aem
- See also: mea

Alma (/ˈɑːlmə/ AHL-mə) or (according to Jones 1997) /'ælmə/) is an English feminine given name, but has historically been used in the masculine form as well, sometimes in the form Almo. The origin of the name is debated; it may have been derived from "alma mater" ("benevolent mother", a title used for the Virgin Mary, and in antiquity, for several goddesses). It gained popularity after the Battle of Alma in the 19th century and appeared as a fashionable name for girls and a popular place name, but it has decreased in appearance in the 20th and 21st centuries. The name Alma also has several meanings in a variety of languages, and is generally translated to mean that the child "feeds one's soul" or "lifts the spirit".

== Origin ==
The exact origin of the name Alma is debated (cf. Hanks/Hodges 1990:'of uncertain origin'), but it is most likely derived in the female form from the Latin word almus, which means "kind", "fostering", or "nourishing". Drosdowski (1974) differentiates between two different names: one derived from Spanish, the other derived from Germanic names with the element 'Amal'. It has been most familiarized by its use in the term alma mater, which means "fostering mother", or "nourishing mother", and in modern times is most associated with a collegiate hymn or song, or to encompass the years in which a student earned their degree. Also, the Arabic words for "the water" and "on the water" are el-ma and al-ma, respectively. It may also be of Greek derivation, where the word αλμη means "salt water". In Hebrew, Alma (עלמה) means a young woman, particularly unmarried, and it appears in the Tanakh in the Book of Genesis 24:43.

=== Early appearances ===
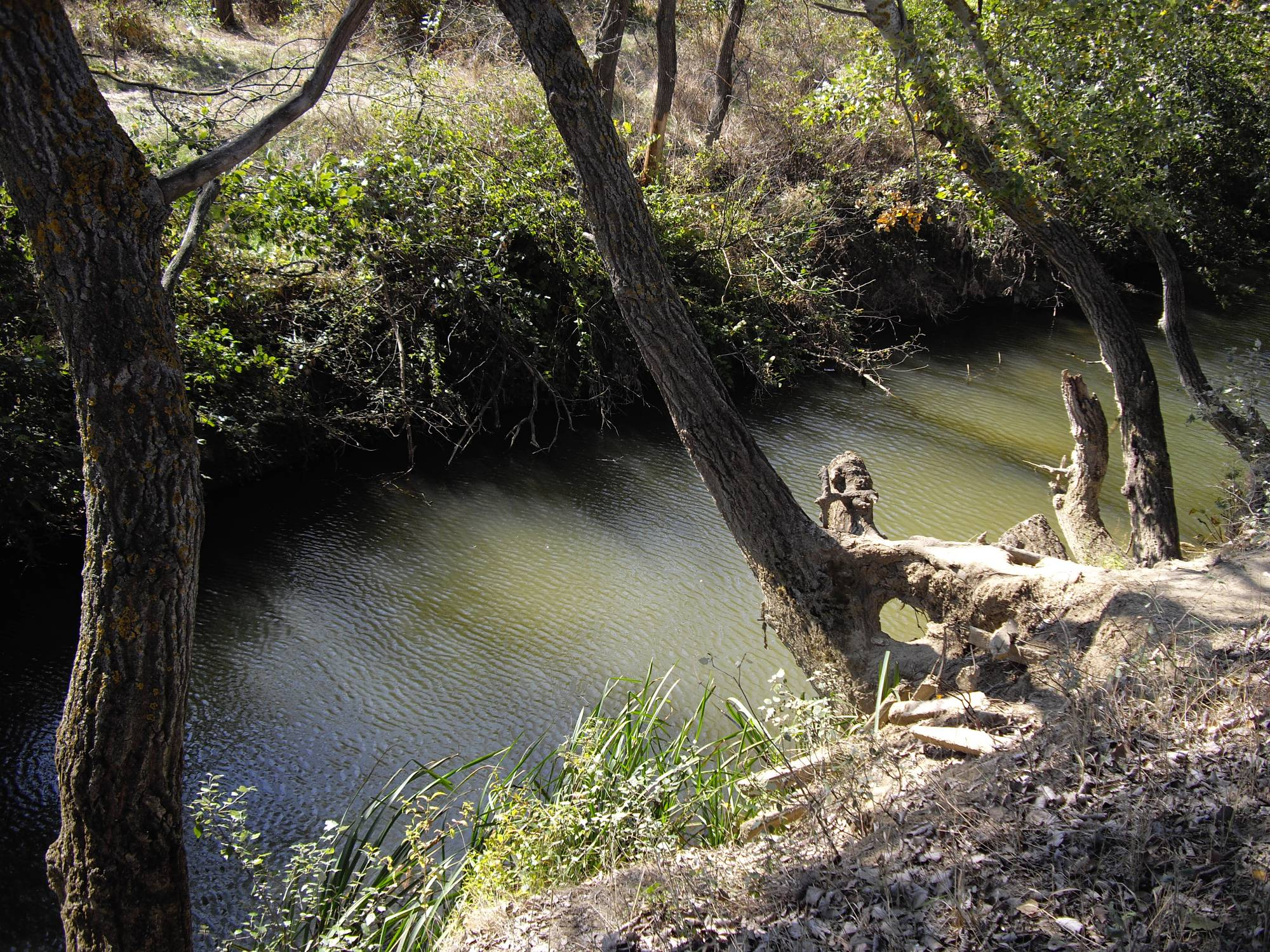
The Alma River.

It has been applied repeatedly for the title of goddesses, namely Diana and Ceres, as well as other deities of the light, earth, and day. Alma was used classically in connotation as a way to reflect the traditional female roles in providing nurture, following its derivation from its Latin root. It was introduced with minimal usage during the Italian Renaissance, as the likely result of a character by Edmund Spenser in his poem The Faerie Queene. Alma, who is the head of the House of Temperance, is considered to parallel the spirit metaphorically.

On 20 September 1854 the Battle of the Alma, named after the nearby Alma River, was fought and ended. This battle is typically considered to be the first battle of the Crimean War, fought between the French, English, and Ottoman empires and the Russian empire. Alma is the Crimean Tatar word for "apple". The name had limited use for females prior to the war, and afterwards it began appearing in birth registers for both male and female, and in significantly higher frequency. Alma also came in conjunction with many terms related to the circumstances of the war, such as "Alma Victoria", "Alma Balaklava" and "Alma Inkerman". Primarily in West England, many were christened with the name Alma. The widespread use has been attributed to the extensive news coverage of the Crimean War.

In the Book of Mormon, a collection of fifteen books first published in 1830 that is regarded as scripture by the Church of Jesus Christ of Latter-day Saints, Alma is given as the name of two characters—a father and his son. The characters are marked by a love for and service of God and appear in the Book of Mosiah and in the Book of Alma.

The name Alma also appears in Irish folklore in the masculine form: the son of Nemed was named "Alma One-Tooth", a noble prince who fought repeatedly for a respite in taxes issued by Conann on his people.

In the 1910 Census (Milan Texas Precinct 7), the name Alma appears within a family descended from Bohemia (or Czechoslovakia, depending on which other document is inspected).

== Name statistics ==
Alma ranked No. 52 of most popular names for girls in the United States in 1901. In birth registers, this constituted .47% of the population, or roughly 1 in every 213 births. Its usage today has dropped into the thousands. It has increased in usage in recent years.

In numerology, the name Alma corresponds to the number 9. The characteristics of this value mean compassion, charitableness, and civility; it is regarded as being the "Humanitarian".

== Meaning ==
The name Alma, with its Latin origin, appears in various European languages, and has different meanings in each. These varieties do not generally stray from the notion of the wise, nurturing mother, however.

- Arabic • Knowing, Knowledgeable, The Unbelievable but True
- Aramaic • World
- Azerbaijani • Apple
- Bashkir • Apple (also the ancient female Bashkir name)
- Chuvash • Apple (ulma)
- Crimean Tatar • Apple
- Gagauz • Apple
- Gothic • Working One, Brave One
- Greek • Leap
- Hebrew • Maiden, Young woman
- Hungarian • Apple
- Irish • Apple (ull)
- Italian • The Spirit, Soul
- Kalmyk • Apple (almn)
- Karachay-Balkar • Apple
- Karaim • Apple
- Karakalpak • Apple
- Kazakh • Apple
- Komi • Apple (ulmö)
- Kumyk • Apple
- Kyrgyz • Apple
- Latin • The Nourishing One, Kind, Life Giving, Gentle, Loving, Bounteous One and The Spiritually Supportive One
- Latin • Apple, an arboreal fruit (mālum)
- Mari • Apple (olma)
- Mongolian • Apple (Apple in Mongolia "Alim")
- Nogai • Apple
- Portuguese • The Spirit, Soul
- Spanish • The Spirit, Soul
- Tatar • Apple
- Turkish • Apple (elma)
- Turkmen • Apple
- Udmurt • Apple (ulmo)
- Urum • Apple
- Uyghur • Apple
- Uzbek • Apple (olma)

In the Hebrew Bible, Almah means maiden – a young girl or a young woman. In the Septuagint, the word is often rendered as parthenos ('virgin'), most famously in Isaiah 7:14, which is quoted in Matthew 1:23 as a prophecy about Jesus being born of the Virgin Mary.

== People ==
=== Women ===
- Alma (Finnish singer), Finnish singer and songwriter
- Alma (French singer), French singer and songwriter
- Alma Flor Ada (born 1938), Cuban-American author and poet
- Alma Adams (born 1946), American politician and educator
- Alma Adamkienė (1927–2023), Lithuanian philologist and philanthropist
- Alma Agger (born 2000), Danish singer
- Alma Rosa Aguirre (1929–2025), Mexican actress
- Alma Y. Alanís (born 1980), Mexican control theorist
- Alma Alcaraz (born 1972), Mexican politician
- Alma M. Aldrich (1837–1902), American politician
- Alma Alexander (born 1965), American writer
- Alma Alfonso (born 1983), Spanish politician
- Alma Allen (resistance member), Danish resistance member
- Alma Allen (politician) (born 1939), American politician
- Alma Åkermark (1853–1933), Swedish feminist
- Alma Bazel Androzzo (1912–2001), American songwriter
- Alma Arnell (1857–1934), Swedish artist
- Alma Asay, American businesswoman
- Alma Ast-Anni (1884–1958), Estonian politician
- Alma del Banco (1862–1943), German painter
- Alma Bećirović, Bosnian filmmaker and theatre director
- Alma Holland Beers (1892–1974), U.S. botanist
- Alma Bella (1910–2012), Filipino actress
- Alma Beltran (1919–2007), Mexican film actress
- Alma Bennett (1914–1958), American film actress
- Alma Jean Billingslea (born 1946), American scholar and teacher
- Alma Birk (1917–1996), British journalist and politician
- Alma Hirsig Bliss (1875–1975), American miniature painter
- Alma Faye Brooks, American-born Canadian disco singer
- Alma Butia (1929–2019), Slovenian sprinter
- Alma Butterfield, Australian writer and actress
- Alma W. Byrd (1924–2017), American politician
- Alma Calderwood (died 1983), Scottish historian and archivist
- Alma Canales (born 1947), American organizer and activist
- Alma Xóchil Cardona (born 1966), Mexican politician
- Alma Čardžić (born 1968), Bosnian singer
- Alma Carlisle (born 1927), American architect
- Alma Carroll (1924–2019), American actress
- Alma Cero (born 1975), Mexican actress, singer, television hostess and ballerina
- Alma Clutton (1873–1955), Canadian photographer
- Alma Cogan (1932–1966), English singer
- Alma Cook (born 1991), American singer-songwriter
- Alma Cooper (born 2002), U.S. Army officer and Miss USA 2024
- Alma Cuervo (born 1951), American stage actress and singer
- Alma Cullen (1938–2021), Screenwriter from the United Kingdom
- Alma Carrie Cummings (1857–1926), American journalist; newspaper editor and proprietor
- Alma Dahlerup (1874–1969), Danish-American philanthropist
- Alma Gould Dale (1854–1930), Canadian Quaker minister
- Alma Dawson (1943–2025), American scholar of librarianship
- Alma Delfina (born 1960), Mexican actress
- Alma Denny (1906–2003), American columnist
- Alma Detthow (1855–1937), Swedish educator and school founder
- Alma Deutscher (born 2005), English composer and musician
- Alma Dolens (1869–1948), Italian pacifist, journalist, and feminist
- Alma Dufour (born 1990), French politician
- Alma Duncan (1917–2004), Canadian painter, artist, filmmaker
- Alma Eikerman (1908–1995), American jeweler and metalsmith
- Alma Eldredge (1841–1925), American politician
- Alma Rosa Hernández Escobar (1956–2022), Mexican politician
- Alma Evans-Freke (1931–2017), New Zealand television personality
- Alma Ezcurra (born 1986), Spanish politician
- Alma Fahlstrøm (1863–1946), Norwegian theatre actress, director and manager
- Alma Martinez Fallon, Dominican and American engineer
- Eloise Alma Flagg (1918–2018), First African American woman principal in Newark
- Alma E. Foerster (1885–1967), American nurse
- Alma Fohström (1856–1936), Finnish operatic soprano
- Alma Speed Fox (1923–2022), American activist
- Alma Francis, American actress and singer
- Alma Francis-Heyliger (born 1973), United States Virgin Islands politician
- Alma Delia Fuentes (1937–2017), Mexican actress
- Alma Galarza, Puerto Rican singer
- Alma Garcia (born 1970), American writer
- Alma Gluck (1884–1938), American opera singer
- Alma Goatley (1887–1969), British composer
- Alma Guillermoprieto (born 1949), Mexican journalist
- Alma Hanlon (1890–1977), American film actress
- Alma Har'el (born 1975), Israeli-American music video and film director
- Alma Hernandez, American politician
- Alma Hinding (1882–1981), Danish film actress
- Alma Hjelt (1853–1907), Finnish women's rights activist
- Alma Hunt (1909–2008), American religious leader
- Alma Jeets (1896–1979), Estonian politician
- Alma Jodorowsky (born 1991), French actress, model and singer
- Alma Jordan, Irish farm safety advocate
- Alma Kar (1908–1992), Polish actress
- Alma Karlin (1889–1950), Slovene-Austrian author
- Alma Kruger (1868/1871–1960), American actress
- Alma Kuula (1884–1941), Finnish singer
- Alma Lee (1914–2000), Swiss-born naturalized British philatelist
- Alma Mahler (1879–1964), Austrian socialite and composer
- Alma Martínez (footballer) (born 1981), Mexican footballer
- Alma Martinez (actress) (born 1953), American actress
- Alma McClelland (1921–2000), American poker player
- Alma Moodie (1898–1943), Australian violinist
- Alma Moreno (born 1959), Filipina actress and politician
- Alma Muriel (1951–2014), Mexican actress
- Alma Murray (1854–1945), English actress
- Alma Ostra-Oinas (1886–1960), Estonian journalist, writer and politician
- Alma Pedersen (born 2006), Danish rhythmic gymnast
- Alma Pihl (1888–1976), Finnish jeweller
- Alma Powell (1937–2024), American audiologist
- Alma Pöysti (born 1981), Finnish actress
- Alma Prica (born 1962), Croatian actress
- Alma Qeramixhi (born 1963), Albanian heptathlete
- Alma Redlinger (1924–2017), Romanian painter
- Alma Reville (1899–1982), English film director, screenwriter and editor, wife of Alfred Hitchcock
- Alma Rosé (1906–1944), Austrian violinist
- Alma Rubens (1897–1931), American actress
- Alma Johanna Ruubel (1899–1990), Estonian mathematician and professor
- Alma Downes Shaw (1893–1969), English medical missionary doctor
- Alma Siedhoff-Buscher (1899–1944), Bauhaus trained German designer
- Alma Söderhjelm (1870–1949), Swedish-Finnish historian
- Alma de Bretteville Spreckels (1881–1968), American socialite and art collector
- Alma G. Stallworth (1932–2020), American politician
- Alma Sundquist (1872–1940), Swedish physician and gynaecologist
- Alma Taylor (1895–1974), British actress
- Alma Tell (1898–1937), American actress
- Alma Thomas (1891–1978), American painter
- Alma Vītola (born 1992), Latvian long-distance runner
- Alma Vogt (1925–2006), Australian cricket player
- Alma Wagen (1878–1967), American mountain climber
- Alma Bridwell White (1862–1946), American religious leader
- Alma Zack (born 1970), Israeli actress and comedienne
- Alma Zadić (born 1984), Austrian politician
- Alma Ziegler (1918–2005), American baseball player
- Alma Zohar (born 1977), Israeli musician

=== Men ===
- Alma Allen (artist) (born 1970), American sculptor
- Alma Hunt (1910–1999), Bermudian and Scottish cricketer
- Alma Claude Burlton Cull (1880–1931), English painter
- Alma Richards (1890–1963), American Latter-day Saint high jumper
- Alma Sonne (1884–1977), American Latter-day Saint general authority
- Alma O. Taylor (1882–1947), American Latter-day Saint missionary and translator

== The Church of Jesus Christ of Latter Day Saints religious figures ==
- Alma the Younger, a prophet in the Book of Mormon
  - Alma the Elder, his father, also a prophet

== Fictional characters ==
- Alma Gutierrez, in the American television series The Wire
- Alma Halliwell, in the soap opera Coronation Street
- Alma Hodge, in the soap opera Desperate Housewives
- Alma Wade, an antagonist from the game F.E.A.R.
- Alma in the American television series “The Handmaids Tale”

== Variants ==
=== In language ===
- Alumit • English, Hebrew.
- Amalia • Hebrew, German, Scandinavian, Czech, Hungarian, Italian
- Almeta, Almetta • African American.
- Aerma (阿 爾 馬) • Chinese.

=== Abbreviations for ===
- Amelia • English
- Amelberga • English.

== Sources ==
- Drosdowski, Günther. 1974. Lexikon der Vornamen. 2nd ed. Mannheim (etc.). Dudenverlag.
- Hanks, Patrick and Flavia Hodges. 1990. A dictionary of first names. OUP.
- Jones, Daniel. 1997. English pronouncing dictionary. 15th ed. Ed. by Peter Roach & James Hartman Cambridge : Cambridge Univ. Press
- Bromiley, Geoffrey William (1995). The International Standard Bible Encyclopedia: Q-Z. Wm. B. Eerdmans Publishing. p. 1211. ISBN 0-8028-3784-0.
- Buckton, T.J. (1854). Notes and Queries. 10. Oxford University Press. ISSN 1471-6941. OCLC 49760337.
- Browder, Sue (1998). The New Age Baby Name Book. Workman Publishing. pp. 393. ISBN 0-7611-0232-9.
- Callary, Edward (2009). Place names of Illinois. University of Illinois Press. p. 425. ISBN 978-0-252-03356-8.
- Charnock, Richard Stephen (1882). "Prænomina; or, The etymology of the principal Christian names of Great Britain and Ireland". Trübner & Co., Ludgate Hill: 128. OCLC 156094657.
- Coghlan, Ronan (1985). Irish First Names. Appletree Press. p. 72. ISBN 0-86281-153-8.
- Grussi, A.M. (2006). Chats on Christian Names. Kessinger Publishing. p. 460. ISBN 1-4286-5787-8.
- Lang, John (2010). Six Poets from the Mountain South: Southern literary studies. LSU Press. p. 209. ISBN 978-0-8071-3560-0.
- Liu, Xiaoan (2005). Best Chinese names: your guide to auspicious names. Asiapac Books Pte Ltd. p. 200. ISBN 981-3068-30-2.
- Murry, John (January–June 1871). The Cornhill Magazine. XXIII. Smith, Elder & Co: 760. OCLC 611177326.
- Norman, Teresa (2003). A World of Baby Names. Perigee. pp. 640. ISBN 0-399-52894-6.
- O'Boyle, Fragrance (2008). Irish Baby Names. Irish Baby Names. p. 228. ISBN 978-0-9558057-0-7.
- Reid, Robert L. (1981). "Alma's Castle and the Symbolization of Reason in the Faerie Queene". The Journal of English and Germanic Philology. 80. ISSN 0363-6941. OCLC 1754568.
- Sheehan, Thomas W. (2001). Dictionary of Patron Saints Names. Our Sunday Visitor Publishing. p. 593. ISBN 0-87973-539-2.
- Woldmar Ruoff, Henry (1909). "The standard dictionary of facts: history, language, literature, biography, geography, travel, art, government, politics, industry, invention, commerce, science, education, natural history, statistics and miscellany". The Frontier press company: 908. OCLC 2654528.
