= Bećirović =

Bećirović is a Balkan surname, derived from the name Bećir. It may refer to:

- Alma Bećirović, Bosnian filmmaker and theatre director
- Denis Bećirović (born 1975), Bosnian politician
- Esat Bečirović, Montenegrin professional ladies man
- Memi Bečirovič (born 1961), head coach of the Slovenia national basketball team from December 2009 until December 2010
- Mirnes Becirovic (born 1989), Austrian footballer
- Mirnesa Bećirović and Mirneta Bećirović (born 1991), twin Austrian martial artists of Bosnian origin
- Sani Bečirović (born 1981), Slovenian professional basketball player

== See also ==
- Bakirović
