= Fleet review =

Parade and review of naval ships by a head of state

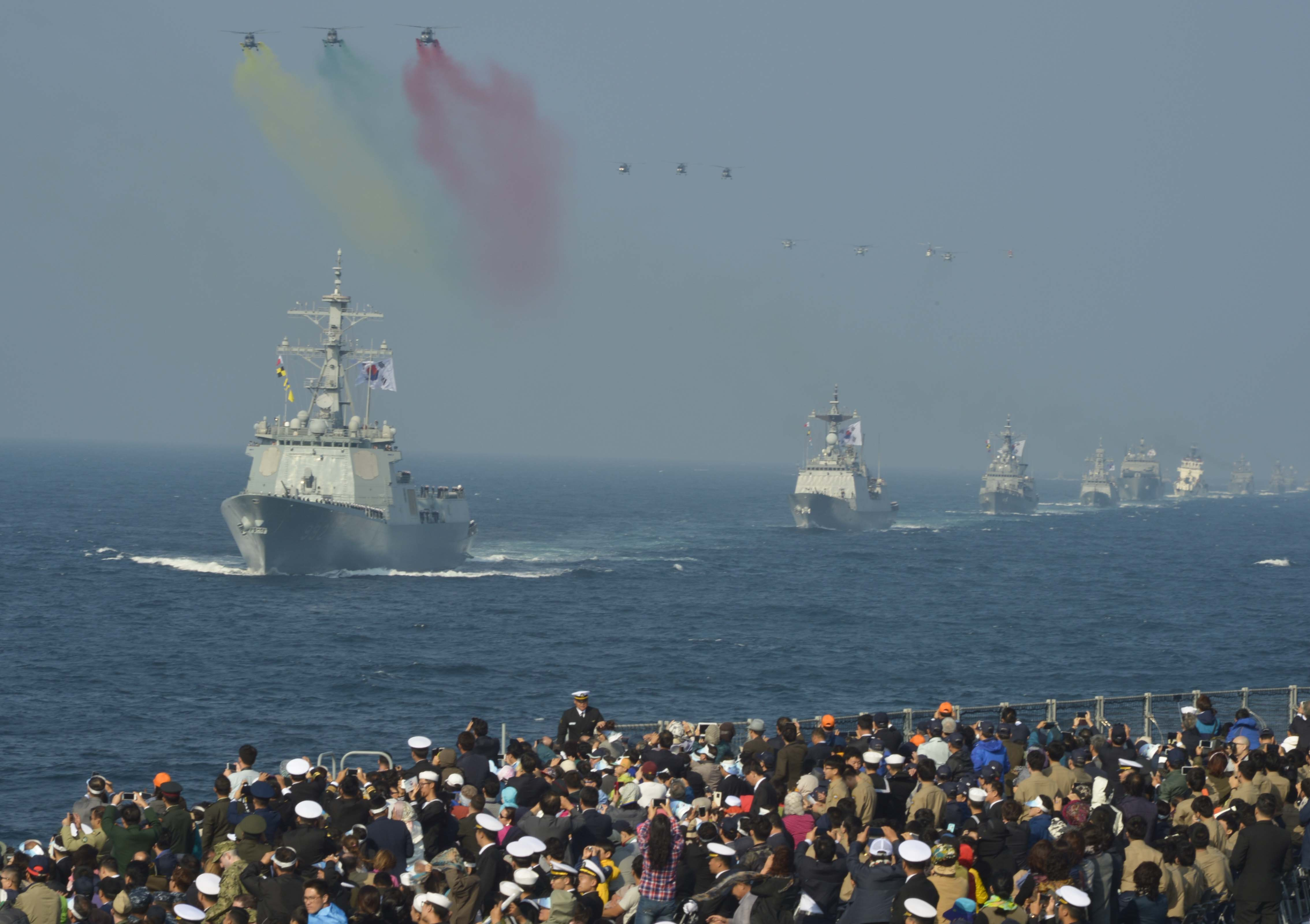
A crowd gathers to watch the Republic of Korea Navy fleet review, held in commemoration of the navy's 70th anniversary in 2015

A fleet review or naval review is an event where a gathering of ships from a particular navy is paraded and reviewed by an incumbent head of state and/or other official civilian and military dignitaries. A number of national navies continue to hold fleet reviews. Fleet reviews may also include participants and warships from multiple navies.

== Commonwealth realms ==
Fleet reviews in the Commonwealth realms are typically observed by the reigning monarch or their representative, a practice allegedly dating back to the 15th century. Such an event is not held at regular intervals and originally only occurred when the fleet was mobilised for war or for a show of strength to discourage potential enemies, or during periods of commemorations. Since the 19th century, they have often been held for the coronation or for special royal jubilees and increasingly included delegates from other national navies.

Traditionally, a fleet review will have participating ships dressed in flags and pennants of their respective countries, and anchored in two or more lines with an open passage between them. The crew of participating anchored ships are positioned on the upper decks, while their officers and captains are at the bridge. As the reviewing vessel sails passes the anchored ships, their crew will give three cheers and wave their caps to the reviewing officials, while their officers and captain will render a salute.

=== Australia ===
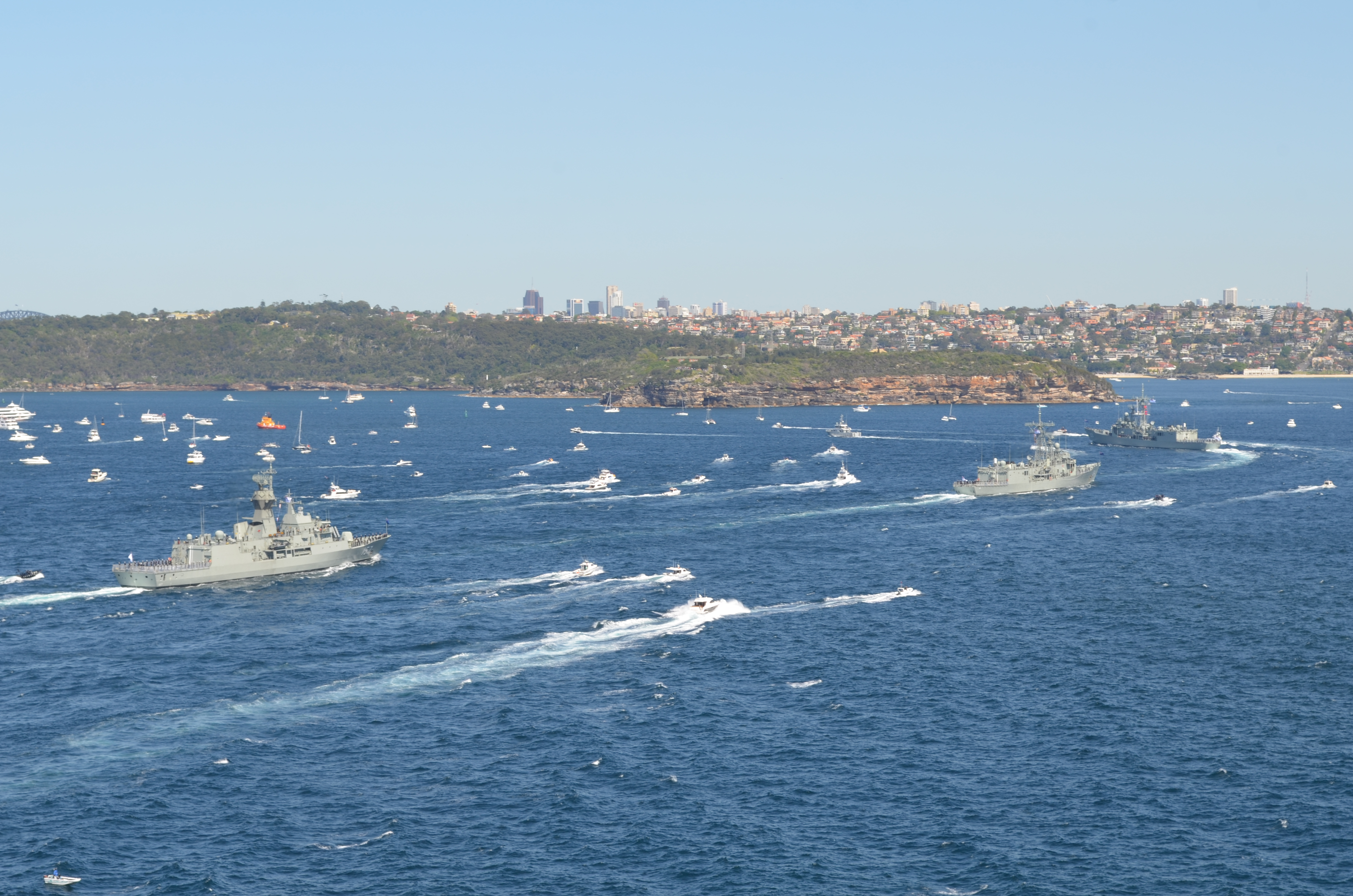
Three frigates of the Royal Australian Navy enter Sydney Harbour during the second day of the 2013 International Fleet Review in Australia

Australia has a history of Fleet Reviews, the last Fleet Review took place in Australia in October 2024.

- Port Phillip royal review, 1921 – Reviewed by Edward, Prince of Wales.
- Royal Australian Navy 25th birthday review, 1936
- 50th Anniversary Fleet Review, 1961
- The 75th fleet review, 1986 – Led by USS Missouri, the fleet was reviewed by Prince Philip, Duke of Edinburgh.
- Bicentennial naval salute, 1988 – Led by USS New Jersey
- Centennial naval review 2001 – Cancelled due to terrorist attacks in the United States.
- Sydney freedom of entry review, 14 March 2009 – The fleet review also consisted of a freedom of entry parade in Sydney; the fleet was reviewed by Marie Bashir, Governor of New South Wales, and the parade by Quentin Bryce, Governor-General of Australia.
- International Fleet Review, 4–5 October 2013 – To commemorate the centenary of the Royal Australian Navy's fleet arrival in Sydney Harbour; led by HMAS Sydney, the fleet was reviewed by Governor-General Quentin Bryce and Prince Harry, who took the royal salute on board HMAS Leeuwin. Approximately 20 foreign nations participated, activities including a tall ships parade, naval gun salutes, aerial flypasts, fireworks and lightshow spectacular, ships open to visitors, and a combined Naval march.
- Royal Fleet Review – King Charles III conducted a royal fleet review in Sydney Harbour on 22 October 2024. The King conducted the review on board the Admiral's Barge Admiral Hudson with HMAS Hobart, HMAS Arunta, HMAS Warramunga, HMAS Gascoyne and HMAS Yarra taking part in the review.

=== Canada ===
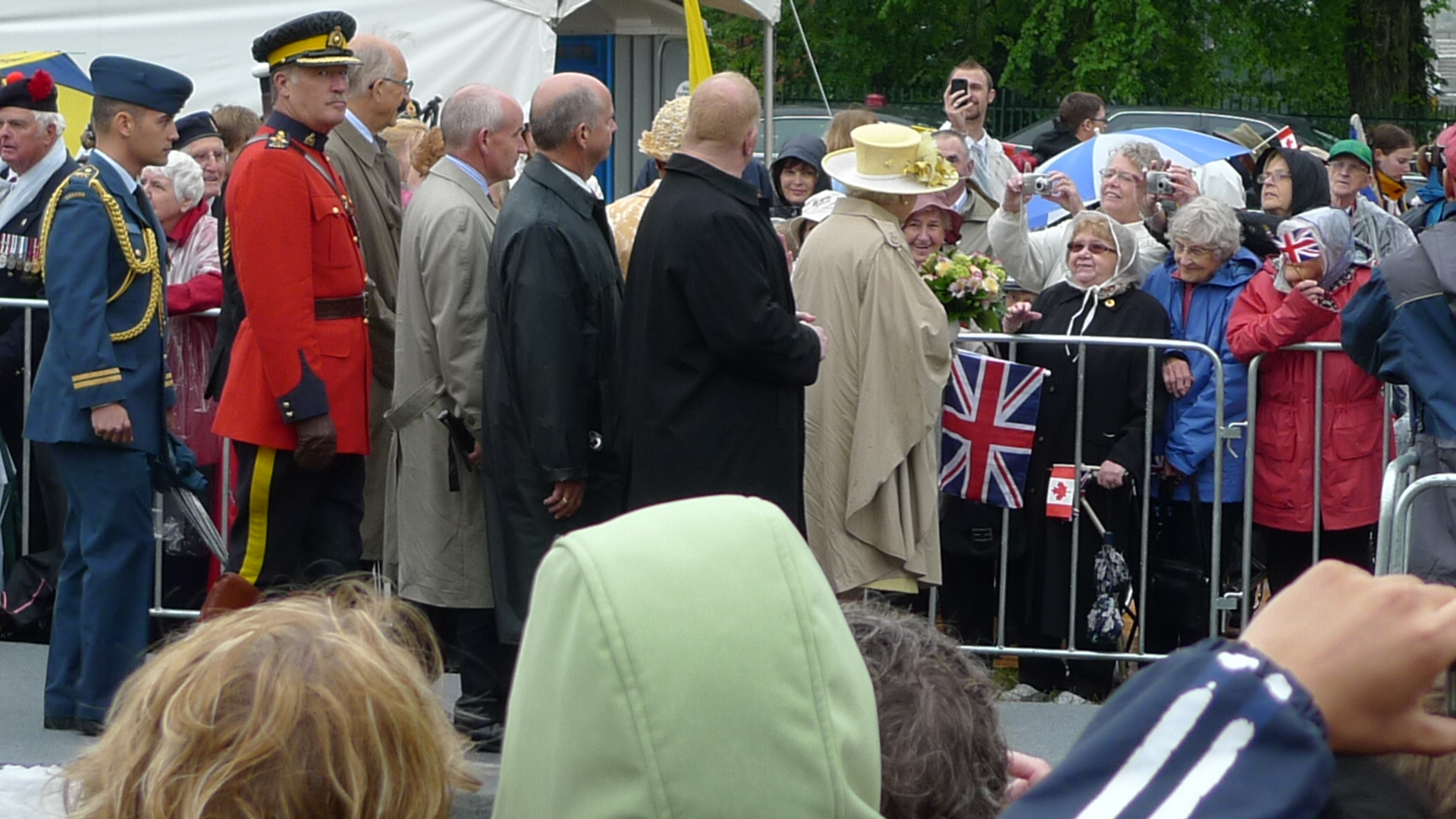
Queen Elizabeth II in Halifax, Nova Scotia a day prior to reviewing the fleet assembled there to commemorate the 100th anniversary of the Royal Canadian Navy

In Canada, fleet reviews may take place on either the Atlantic or Pacific coasts, typically in Halifax Harbour for the former and Victoria Harbour for the latter.

- July 1958 – To mark the 100th anniversary of British Columbia's entry into Canadian Confederation; the Royal Canadian Navy review was conducted by Princess Margaret, Countess of Snowdon.
- June 1959 – Held at Montreal to mark the opening of the Saint Lawrence Seaway; attended by ships from the Royal Canadian Navy and United States Navy; the former was reviewed by Queen Elizabeth II.
- July 1959 – Held at Halifax Harbour; reviewed by Queen Elizabeth II.
- 12 June 2010 – The Pacific Canadian Naval Centennial International Fleet Review was held to mark the 100th anniversary of the founding of the Royal Canadian Navy and held at Esquimalt Harbour. Ships from the Royal Canadian Navy, Royal Australian Navy, Marine nationale, Japan Maritime Self-Defense Force, Royal New Zealand Navy, and United States Navy were reviewed by Governor General Michaëlle Jean.
- 29 June 2010 – An International Fleet Review was held to mark the 100th anniversary of the founding of the Royal Canadian Navy and held at the Bedford Basin. Ships of the Royal Canadian Navy, Brazilian Navy, Royal Danish Navy, French Navy, German Navy, Royal Netherlands Navy, Royal Navy, and United States Navy were reviewed by Queen Elizabeth II.

=== New Zealand ===
There have been several Fleet Reviews hosted by the Royal New Zealand Navy (RNZN). These include the following:

- International Fleet Review, 5 October 1991 – To mark the 50th anniversary of the RNZN.
- International Naval Review, 18 November 2016 – To mark the Royal New Zealand Navy's 75th birthday. In a break with tradition the RNZN mistakenly described the Review as a "Naval Review" rather than as the customary "Fleet Review".

=== United Kingdom ===
Because of the need for a natural large, sheltered and deep anchorage, UK fleet reviews have usually been held in the Solent off Spithead, although Southend, Torbay, the Firth of Clyde and some overseas ports have also hosted reviews. In the examples below, the venue is Spithead unless otherwise noted.

A list follows of fleet reviews in England, Great Britain, and later the UK since the 14th century.

==== Pre-1700 ====
- June 1346 – Edward III, before sailing to war with France
- 1415 – Generally acknowledged as the first fleet review on record, by Henry V, at Southampton, before sailing for his first French campaign that ended in the Battle of Agincourt
- May 1662 – Charles II on the occasion of his wife Catherine of Braganza's arrival in Portsmouth
- February 1693 – William III and Mary II, after the Battles of Barfleur and La Hougue

==== 1700–1837 ====
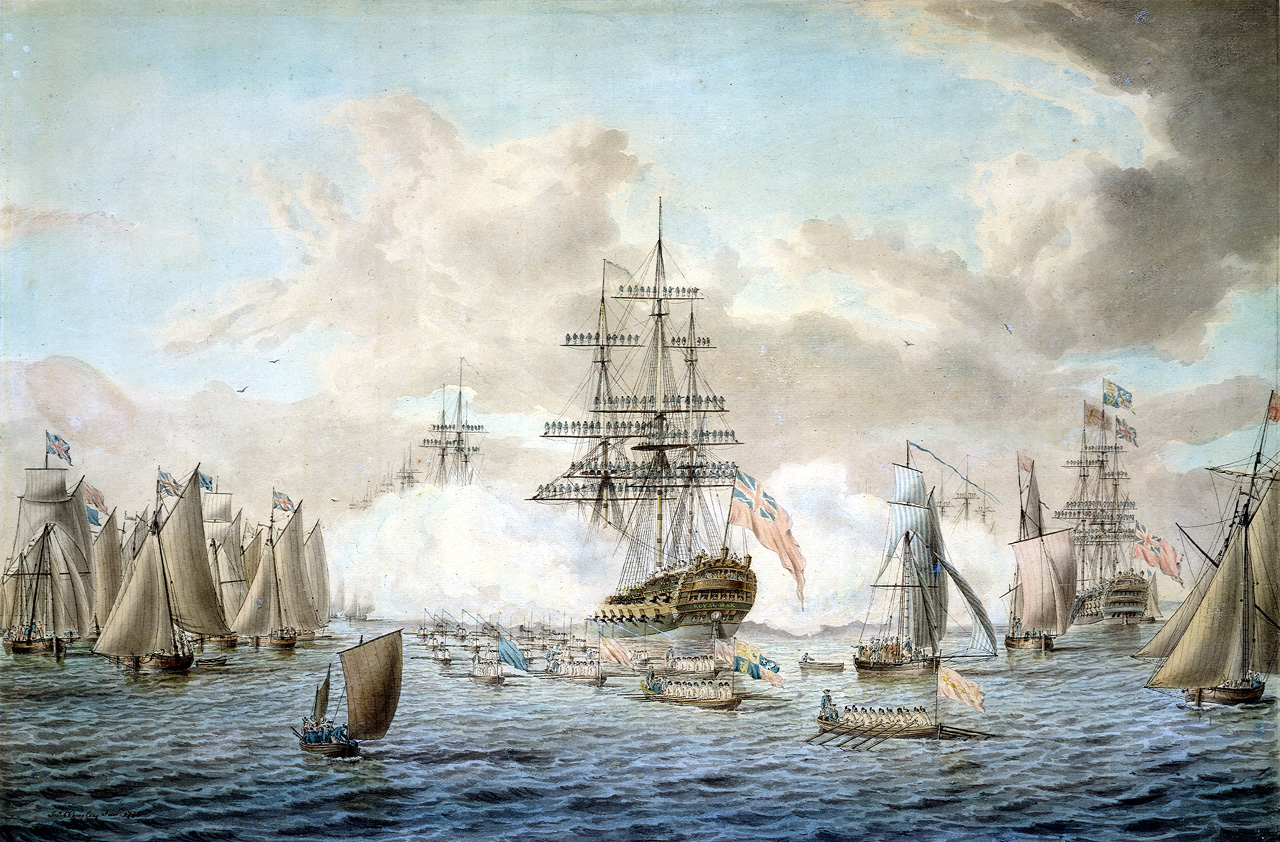
King George III reviewing the fleet from rowboats (centre foreground) at Spithead, 1773

- March 1700 – On Peter the Great's visit to England, a show of strength
- 23–27 June 1773 – King George III set out from Kew, in a Royal coach with scarlet outriders, for what some call the first formal Royal Review. On his arrival he was saluted by a "triple discharge of cannon", and proceeded to the dockyard where admirals and captains were assembled, each with his barge, to escort the King to Spithead. They had dressed their crews in fancy colours, each to his own taste (at that time the crews were not issued uniforms), whilst they themselves were resplendent in the full dress designed for them by George II in 1748. The ships on show were those that had fought the French in the Seven Years' War and were soon to join the War of American Independence, and were led by HMS Barfleur, of 90 guns, built only 5 years before.
- May 1778 – George III, before France joined American War of Independence
- 1781
- June 1794 – After the Glorious First of June
- 25 June 1814 – The last to consist solely of sailing ships. It was to celebrate the Treaty of Paris (1814), and to show the visiting Allied Sovereigns, including the Czar of Russia and the King of Prussia, "the tremendous naval armaments which has swept from the ocean the fleets of France and Spain and secured to Britain the domain of the sea." 15 ships of the line and 31 frigates were present, all of them veterans of the Napoleonic Wars. It was reviewed not by George III, but by the Prince Regent
- September 1820 – George IV, first Coronation Review. One ship in attendance was HMS Beagle, later made famous by Charles Darwin.

==== Queen Victoria ====
17 occurred during her reign, the most for any monarch.

Fleet review during the Shah of Persia's visit in 1876. HMS Duke of Wellington, then the flagship at Portsmouth, may be seen in the left foreground.

- March 1842 – Her first, held by herself and Prince Albert as a "Grand Naval Review."
- May 1844 – Visit of the King of Saxony; and October, on the visit of Emperor Nicholas I, King Louis-Philippe of France and Friedrich Wilhelm IV of Prussia, both were a show of strength
- 19 June 1845 – Inspecting the experimental squadron, from the new HMY Victoria and Albert (1843). The Board of Admiralty attended in their steam yacht, Black Eagle. Some place this not 1814 as the last time that a Royal Review consisted only of sailing ships, and nearly the last time that the Queen could watch HMS Trafalgar's men run aloft and set the sails "with feline agility and astonishing celerity."
- 11 August 1853 – Two reviews that year, firstly on 15 July 1853, the fleet mobilisation for the Crimean War, and a full Review on 11 August including for the first time steam screw ships of the line.
- 10 March 1854 – Wary of a Russian break out into the North Sea, due to the numbers of their ships in the Baltic Sea, the British Admiralty brought together a force to contain them. This first division of the Baltic fleet was commanded by Vice-Admiral Sir Charles Napier. Napier's task was to find naval recruits and train them as quickly as possible. From the screw yacht-tender, HMS Fairy, and two months before her 35th birthday (which it was perhaps also intended to commemorate), Queen Victoria reviewed Napier's fleet at Spithead, shortly before it set sail, including (on 10 March 1854) a review of the first part of the fleet to set sail only eighteen days before Britain declared war on Russia. According to reports in the London Illustrated News (which printed a special edition for the occasion, with drawings of various scenes from the day of the Review), Fairy reviewed the fleet as it steamed up a path created by the ships anchored on each side, then a day later led the fleet out of Spithead as it began its journey to the Baltic.
- 23 April 1856 – Of the Baltic fleet on its return. First recorded example of the evening illumination of the fleet. Showed lessons learnt from the Crimean War, with the first of the ironclad ships present in the form of 4 1,500-ton floating batteries. Over 100 gunboats were present, "puffing about like locomotive engines with wisps of white steam trailing from their funnels."
- August 1865 – On a visit of the French fleet
- 17 July 1867 – Held for Abdulaziz, and his Khedive of Egypt, Ismail of Egypt. For the first time every ship flew the White Ensign, after the dissolution of the old Red, White and Blue Squadrons. New designs were the five-masted HMS Minotaur with her powerful broadside, and the graceful 14-knot ironclad sister-ships HMS Warrior and HMS Black Prince.

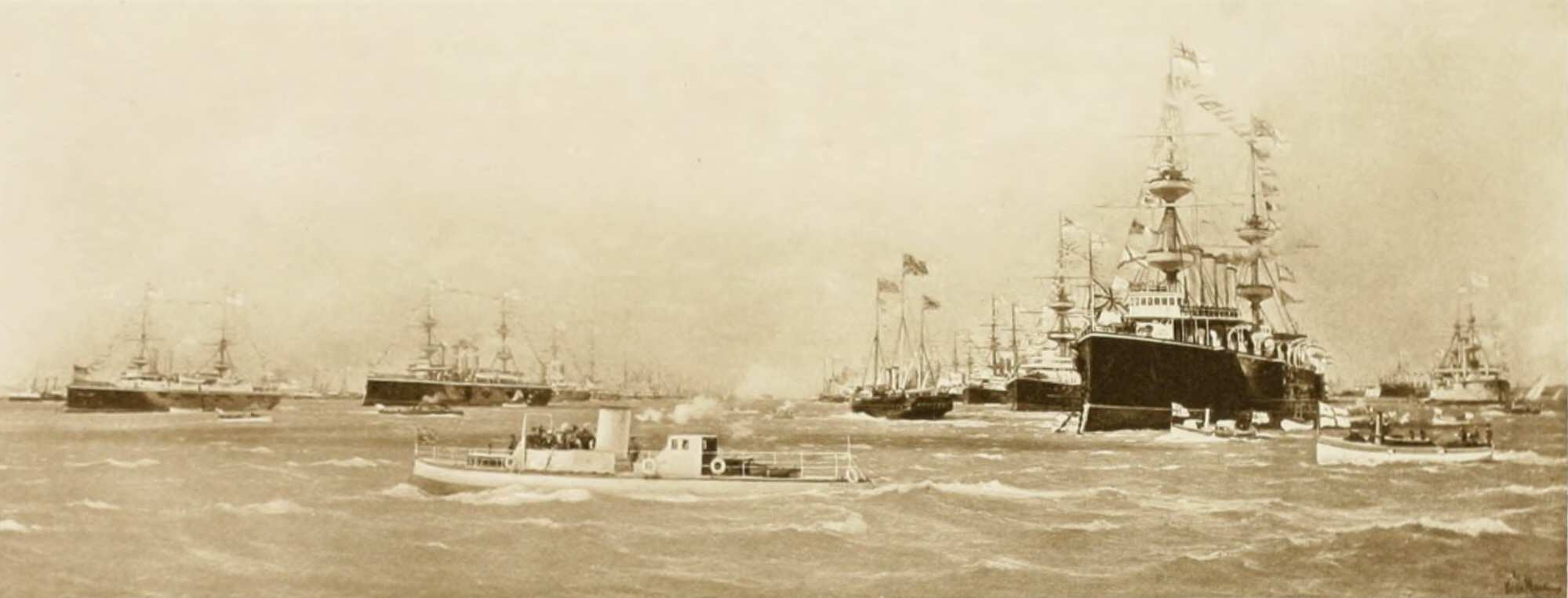
Fleet review during the Diamond Jubilee of Queen Victoria on 26 June 1897

- 23 June 1873 – For the visit of Nasser-al-Din Shah (1848–1896), the Shah of Persia
- August 1878 – Of the reserve squadron
- 25 July 1887 – Golden Jubilee. Notable for the appearance of a Nordenfelt submarine (though the first RN submarine would be Holland 1 20 years later)
- 4 August 1889 – On the visit of Kaiser Wilhelm II and his Admiral von Tirpitz, a show of strength
- August 1891 – On visit of the French fleet
- August 1896 – On visit of MPs and Li Hung Chang
- 26 June 1897 – Diamond Jubilee, notable for being presided over by the Prince of Wales (later Edward VII) since Victoria was too frail to attend in person. The ships formed two lines seven miles long; the 170 British ships included 50 battleships. Parsons made an unscheduled and dramatic appearance with his Turbinia showing power the of a steam turbine.
- August 1899 – Victoria's last, presided over by the Prince of Wales since she was too frail to attend in person, and for the visit of a squadron from the German Navy.

==== Edward VII ====
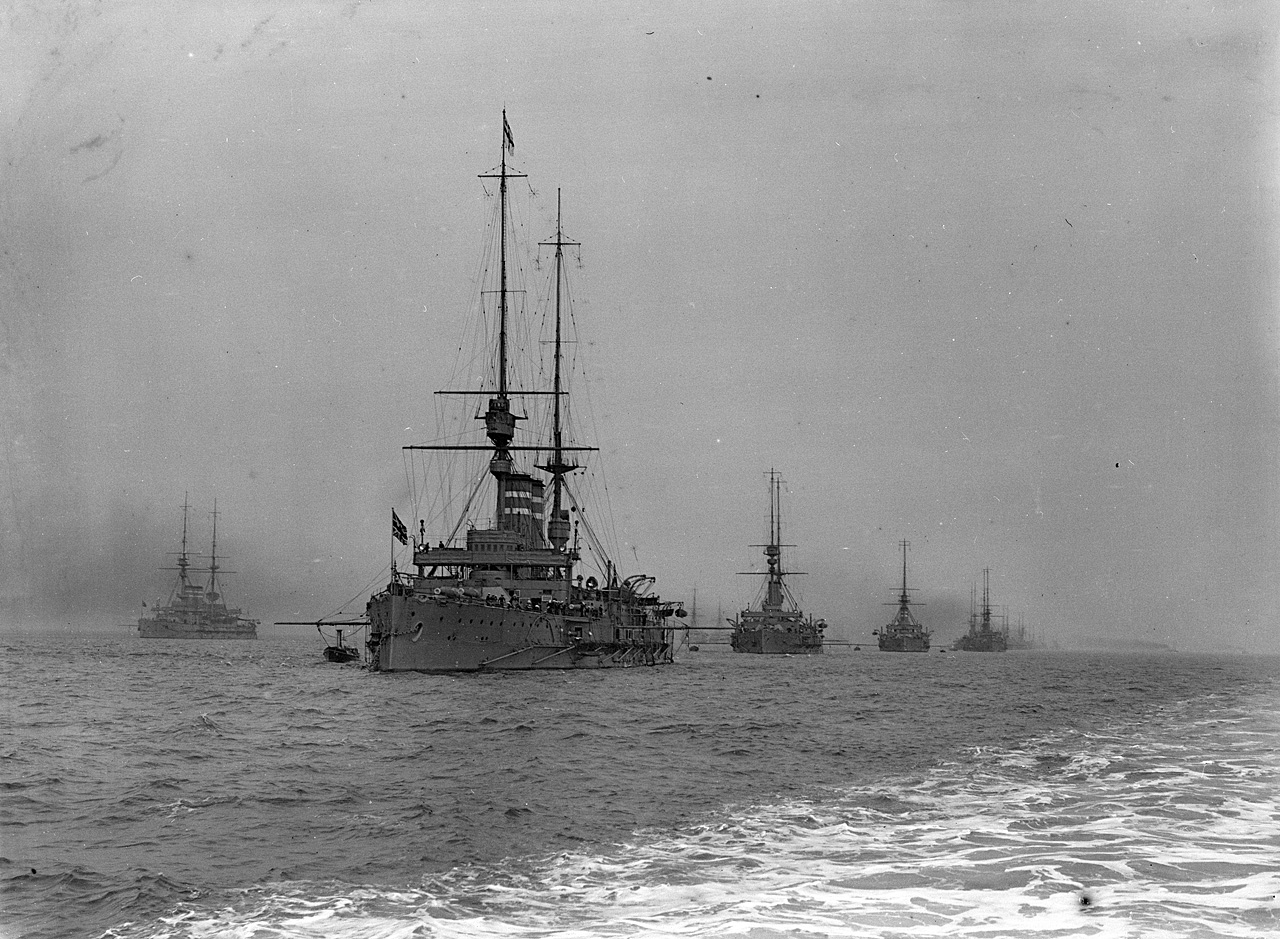
Lines of battleships at the 1909 review of the Home and Atlantic Fleet

The frequency of fleet reviews in this period is due to the Anglo-German naval arms race.

- 16 August 1902 – Coronation Review, the first time in the modern era that a review was used to mark the coronation
- 9 August 1905 – Review of the British and French fleets by King Edward VII at Spithead
- August 1907 – Review of the reconstituted Home Fleet
- 12 June 1909 – Review of Home Fleet and Atlantic Fleet, including HMS Invincible
- 16 July 1909 – Home and Atlantic fleets assemble off Southend prior to display Southend, including HMS Invincible
- 17–24 July 1909 – Home and Atlantic Fleets on display from Westminster to the Nore.

==== George V ====
Arrival of the Fleet for the Coronation Review by A. B. Cull. The painting depicts the arrival of the fleet at Spithead to celebrate the coronation of King George V and Queen Mary in 1911

- 24 June 1911 – Coronation Fleet Review. USS Delaware sailed 4 June from America and appeared at the review from 19 June to 28 June.
- The cruiser Hai Chi of the Imperial Chinese Navy appeared to participate in the fleet review.
- 9 May 1912 – For Houses of Parliament, at Weymouth, featured the first take-off of a plane from a ship which was underway - on 4 May Commander Charles Samson became the first man to take off from a ship which was underway. He did this in a Short S.27 biplane whilst HMS Hibernia steamed at 10.5 knots (19 km/h).
- 18–20 July 1914 – fleet mobilisation for World War I. No fewer than 59 warships and 17 seaplanes
- 21–22 July 1919 – At Southend, to mark the end of World War I
- Saturday 26 July 1924, including HMS Warspite
- 16 July 1935 – Silver Jubilee. 160 warships including HMS Revenge. Rear admiral Dudley Davenport, at the time a young cadet serving on board HMS Iron Duke noted his impressions of this event in his diary:

"Turned out at 0545 and scrubbed focsle… after breakfast we gave all the brightwork a final polish and generally cleaned up… after lunch we fell in on deck … All the ships with saluting guns fired a royal salute of 21 guns the noise was not as bad as we were led to expect. But the smoke screened most of the ships for some minutes… After tea ‘Clean Lower Deck’ was sounded and we had to fall in for manning ship my position on Y Turret grid on the Quarter Deck was an excellent one as we could see the yacht approaching… as the V&A approached the band played ‘God Save the King’ and the guard presented arms in the Royal Salute. When the King was halfway past we gave 3 cheers. You could just see the King on the Bridge, Saluting… About ½ hour later we fell in again as he passed the other side.

After supper we watched the illuminations… after half hour all the lights were turned off and red flares were lit on deck, each held by a sailor at the guardrail. These did not look very good except for the first few seconds… the ships remained illuminated for the rest of the time until midnight… We turned in about 2345 very tired."

==== George VI ====
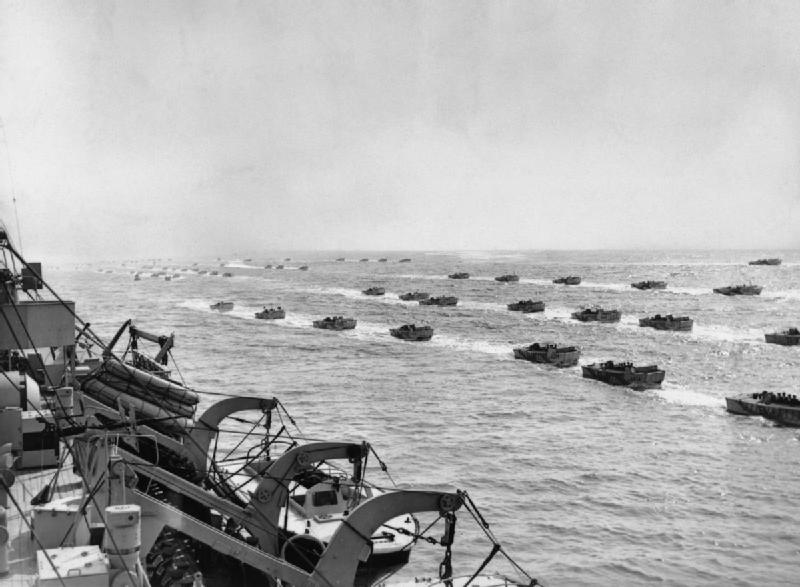
A fleet of assault landing crafts pass HMS Bulolo during naval exercises in 1944. King George VI is aboard the Bulolo, saluting as the fleet of LCAs passes by.

- 20 May 1937 – Coronation Fleet Review. The largest assembly of warships since the coronation review of 1911, it has been described by military historian Hedley Paul Willmott as "the last parade of the Royal Navy as the world's greatest and most prodigious navy". Ten British battleships and battlecruisers were present, and for the first time at a coronation review, four aircraft carriers. Altogether, there were 101 surface warships, 22 submarines and 11 auxiliaries drawn from the Home, Mediterranean and Reserve Fleets.

The Review Procession included the royal yacht, HMY Victoria and Albert, two minesweepers and a survey ship. The Commonwealth and Empire were represented by two warships from Canada and one each from New Zealand and India. A large complement of British merchant ships ranging from ocean liners to paddle steamers were also present.

By tradition, foreign navies were invited to send a single warship each to the review and seventeen were present. Notable among them were USS New York, which had brought Admiral Hugh Rodman, the President's personal representative for the coronation, across the Atlantic; the new French battleship Dunkerque; and the elderly Soviet Marat. Also present were the formidable looking German "pocket battleship", Admiral Graf Spee, the Greek cruiser, Georgios Averof and the Japanese heavy cruiser, Ashigara.

Described by one naval officer in a letter to a friend -

"The day was quite as bad as I feared but my sisters are insistent that they enjoyed it all"

It was also the occasion of the infamous "Woodrooffe Incident" in the BBC Radio coverage (known by the phrase 'The Fleet's Lit Up!')

HMY Victoria and Albert III took part in this review, her second and last before being scrapped in 1939.

- 9 August 1939 – Including HMS Revenge
- May 1944 – In secret, of the D-Day invasion fleet: the largest review to date (800 vessels, ranging from capital vessels to small minesweeper and landing craft).

==== Elizabeth II ====
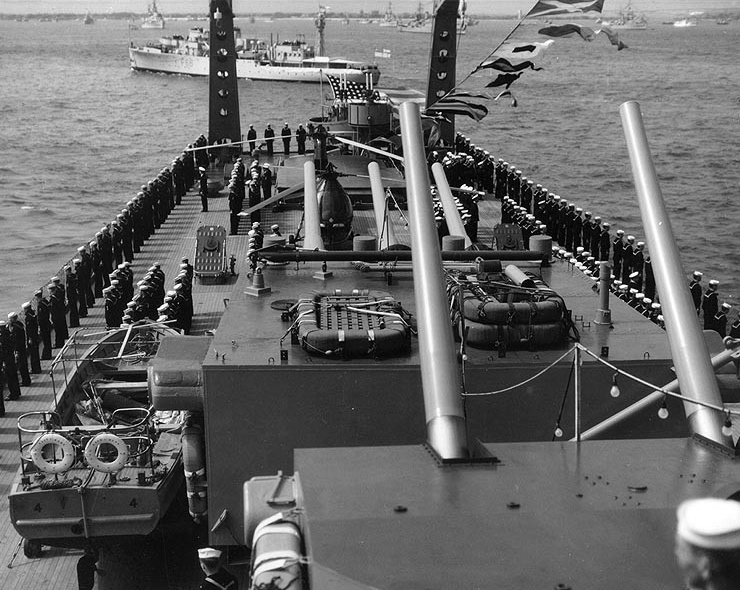
Sailors of the USS Baltimore man the rails during the 1953 fleet review for the coronation of Elizabeth II

- 15 June 1953 – Coronation Fleet Review, Coronation of Queen Elizabeth II. The first post-war review, with all the ongoing technical innovations the war had produced on display. Present were 197 Royal Navy warships, together with 13 from the Commonwealth and 16 from foreign navies, as well as representative vessels from the British Merchant Navy and Fishing Fleets.
- 27–28 May 1957 – Review of the fleet off Invergordon, Scotland.
- 7–11 August 1965 – Partial review at the Tail of the Bank on Firth of Clyde. First RN nuclear submarine HMS Dreadnought appeared.
- 16 May 1969 – NATO review (NATO's 20th anniversary), Spithead: 64 ships from the 11 NATO countries participated: British contingent included HMS Phoebe and HMS Dido; United States - USS Wasp.
- July 1969 – Fleet Review: Ships of the Western Fleet (14 ships) and Queen's Colour presentation aboard HMS Eagle in Torbay
- 28 June 1977 – Silver Jubilee of Elizabeth II. HMS Blake and HMS Tiger both appeared.
- 1993 – Commemoration of Battle of the Atlantic anniversary, HMS Cornwall as flagship of the event (off North Wales).
- 1994 – D-Day 50th anniversary, including HMS Edinburgh.
- 1999 – Battle of the Atlantic commemoration.
- 28 June 2005 – International Fleet Review for Trafalgar 200, also held in lieu of the 2002 Golden Jubilee Review, the latter of which was cancelled on cost grounds.

== India ==
Since India became a Republic in 1950, 13 fleet reviews have taken place of which, three were International fleet reviews (IFR) - in 2001, 2016 and 2026.

== Japan ==
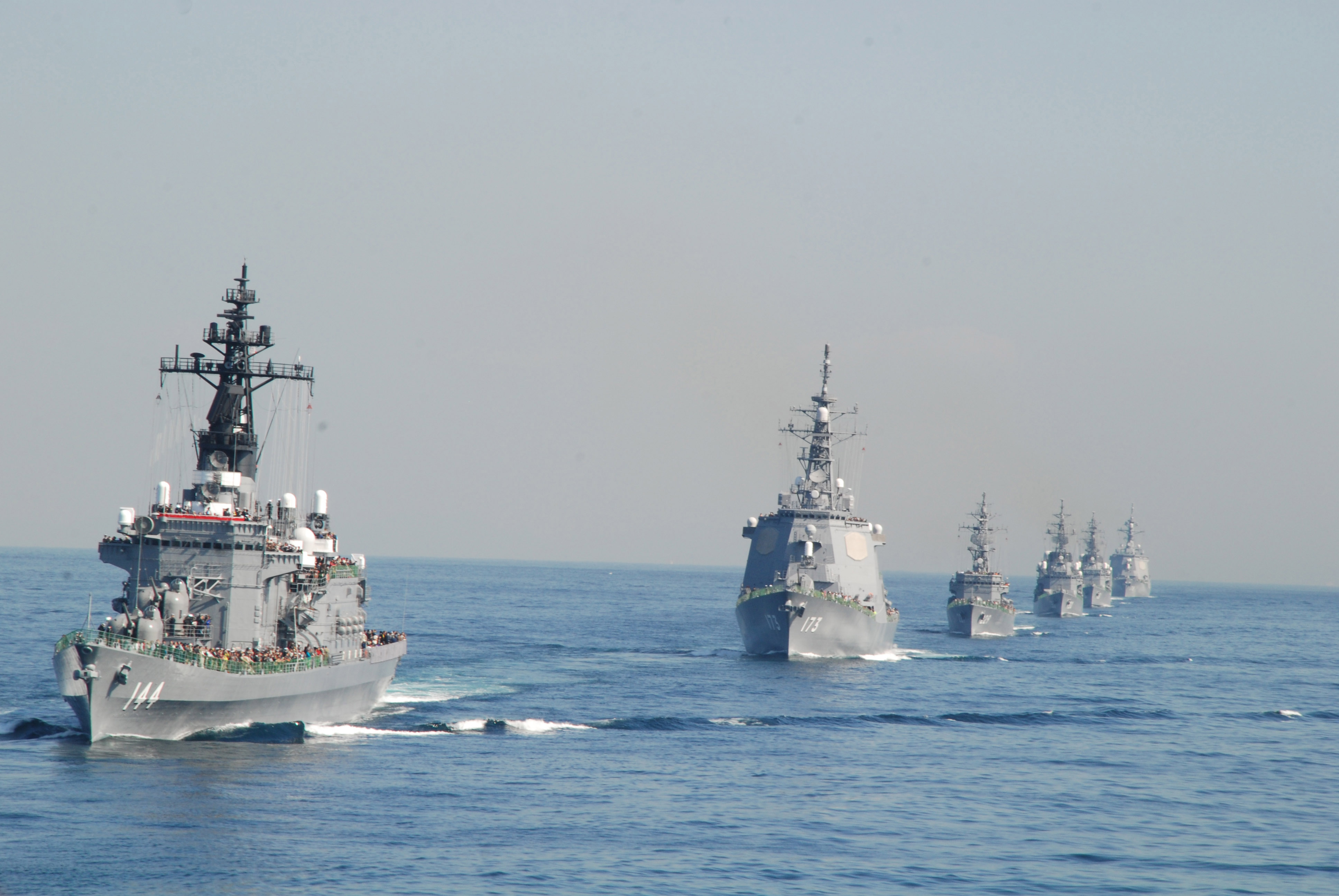
Destroyers of the JMSDF during rehearsals for the 2009 fleet review

Since 1956, the Japan Maritime Self-Defense Force has hosted a fleet review approximately every three years in Sagami Bay. The Imperial Japanese Navy had historically held fleet reviews from 1869 to 1940.

The Japan Coast Guard last held a fleet review in 2018 in honor of the JCG's 70th anniversary.

== South Korea ==
In October 1998, the Republic of Korea Navy hosted its first international fleet review in commemoration of the 50th anniversary of the Republic of Korea off the coast of Busan. They have since reconvened every 10 years on the 60th and 70th anniversaries in 2008 and 2018.

21 ships from 11 countries (Australia, Bangladesh, France, India, Indonesia, Japan, New Zealand, Philippines, Singapore, United Kingdom, United States) participated in the first fleet review together with 34 ships and 15 aircraft from South Korea.

== United States ==
The United States Navy has hosted several naval reviews, with ships paraded by the navy reviewed by the president of the United States or the United States Secretary of the Navy.

== See also ==
- Customs and traditions of the Royal Navy
- Naval tradition
