= Hirsig =

Hirsig is a surname. Notable people with the surname include:

- Alma Hirsig Bliss (1875–c. 1959), American miniature painter
- Leah Hirsig (1883–1975), Swiss-American Thelemite
- Santiago Hirsig (born 1978), Argentine footballer
- William G. Hirsig (1868–1924), American automobile dealer

== See also ==
- Louis Hirsig House, historic house in Madison, Wisconsin
