= Alma Lee =

British philatelist (1914–2000)

- Born: Hedwige Alma Grunberg; 30 April 1914; Switzerland
- Died: 2 July 2000 (aged 86)
- Known for: Philatelist
- Spouse: Ronald A. Lee

Hedwige Alma Lee FRPSL RDP (née Grunberg; 30 April 1914 – 2 July 2000) was a Swiss-born naturalised British philatelist who specialised in the stamps of Switzerland and in topical collecting. She won large gold medals for her displays at Naba 1984, Stockholmia 1986, Hafnia 1987 and Finlandia 1988 and her collection was exhibited in the Court of Honour at PhilexFrance 1989 and New Zealand 1990. She signed the Roll of Distinguished Philatelists in 1991 and later became the only non-resident member of the Consilium Philateliae Helveticae (Council of Swiss Philately). The Royal Philatelic Society London award the Lee Medal in memory of Alma and her husband Ron.

== Early life and family ==
Hedwige Grunberg was born in Switzerland on 30 April 1914, but spent most of her life in Britain. She became a naturalised British citizen in 1976. In 1979, she married fellow philatelist Ronald Lee, after which she was known as H. Alma Lee and later just Alma Lee.

== Philately ==
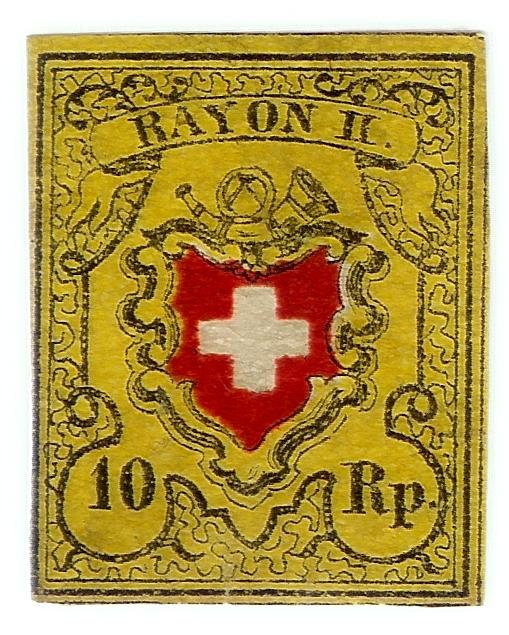
An 1850 Swiss Rayon stamp of the type that Lee attempted to plate (not from the Lee collection)

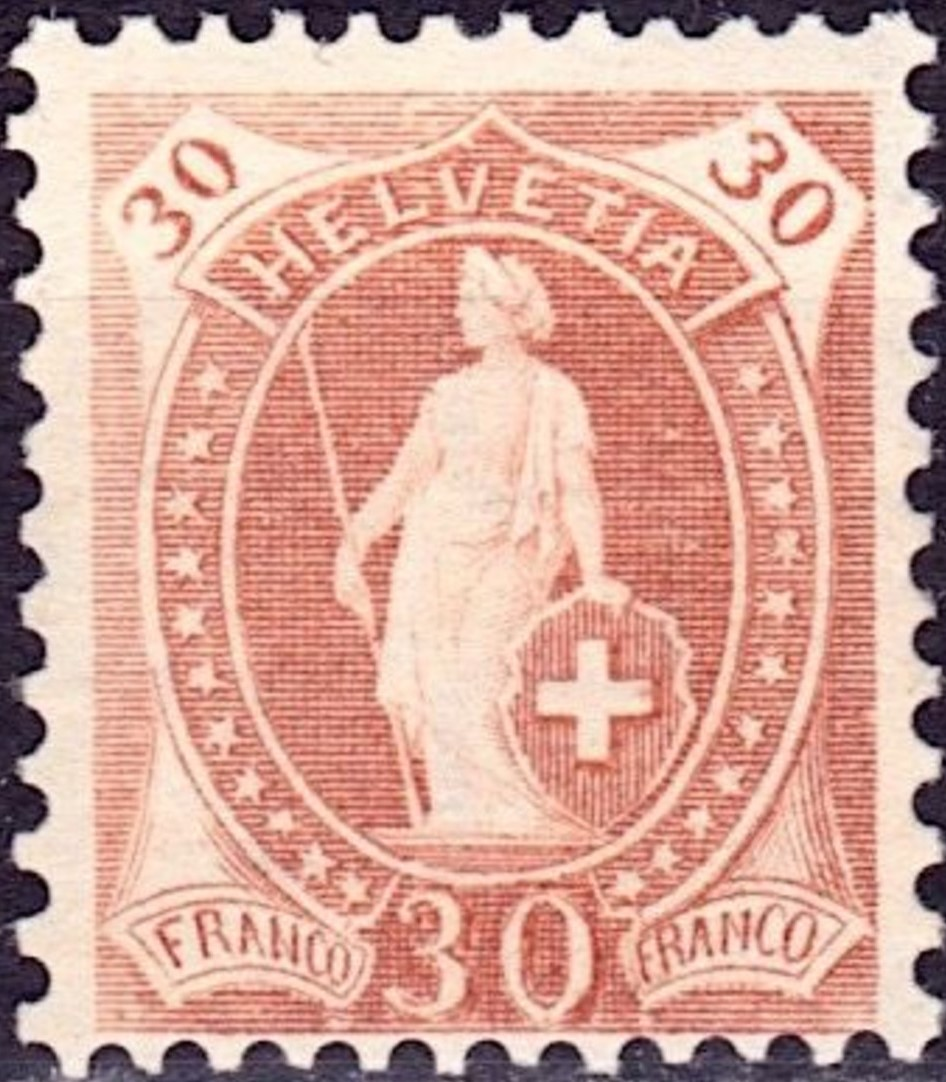
A 30c "standing Helvetia" stamp of Switzerland of the type in which Lee specialised (not from the Lee collection)

Lee's principal philatelic interests were the stamps of Switzerland and topical collecting. She was president of the London Swiss Philatelic Society from 1982 to 1991. Her collection of early Swiss material won large gold medals at Naba 1984, Stockholmia 1986, Hafnia 1987 and Finlandia 1988 and was shown in the Court of Honour at PhilexFrance 1989 and New Zealand 1990. She was a judge of philatelic exhibitions at British national level for over 20 years. She also became interested in the Zemstvo local stamps of Russia, and presented a paper on them in 1991 before the Royal Philatelic Society London based on the collection of her husband who had died in 1990.

Lee was closely associated with the Royal Philatelic Society London to which she was elected in 1967, becoming a fellow in 1969 and an honorary fellow in 1999. She was awarded their London medal in the 1980s for services to their library and expert committee. She donated the 80 volumes of her Swiss collection to the society during her lifetime, one of the most significant donations the society had ever received. It was described in The London Philatelist as among the finest then existing, particularly strong in the "standing Helvetia" and other Helvetia issues in which Lee specialised. "Standing Helvetica" stamps were first issued in 1882 and are considered particularly beautiful by collectors. She attempted to plate the Swiss Rayon stamps.

She signed the Roll of Distinguished Philatelists in 1991, the first woman to do so since 1976, and subsequently became the only non-resident member of the Consilium Philateliae Helveticae (Council of Swiss Philately), a society whose members are mostly former presidents of Swiss philatelic societies.

== Death and legacy ==
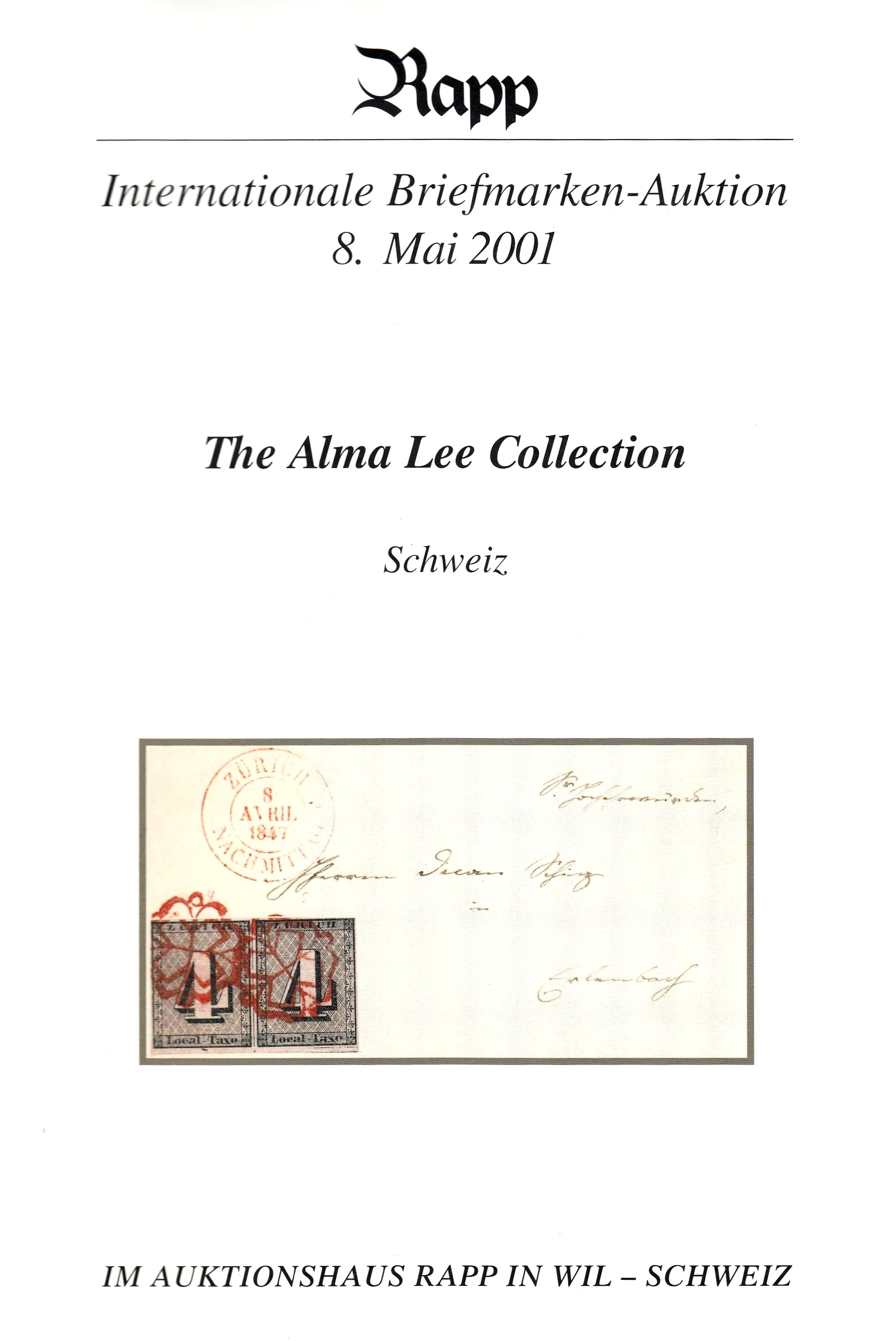
Auction catalogue for the sale of the Alma Lee Collection of Swiss stamps, May 2001.

Alma Lee died on 2 July 2000. Her funeral was at Golders Green Crematorium in north London. She received obituaries in the British Philatelic Bulletin and The London Philatelist. Her Swiss collection was sold at auction by Peter Rapp in eight instalments in 2001 after a representative selection had been extracted for the Royal Philatelic Society London's own purposes. The society instituted the Lee Medal in 2002 in memory of Alma and her husband Ron for displays given at the society by members. It was first awarded in 2002 to Joseph Hackmey for his display and accompanying paper, "Chile – the Colon (Columbus) Heads."

== Selected publications ==
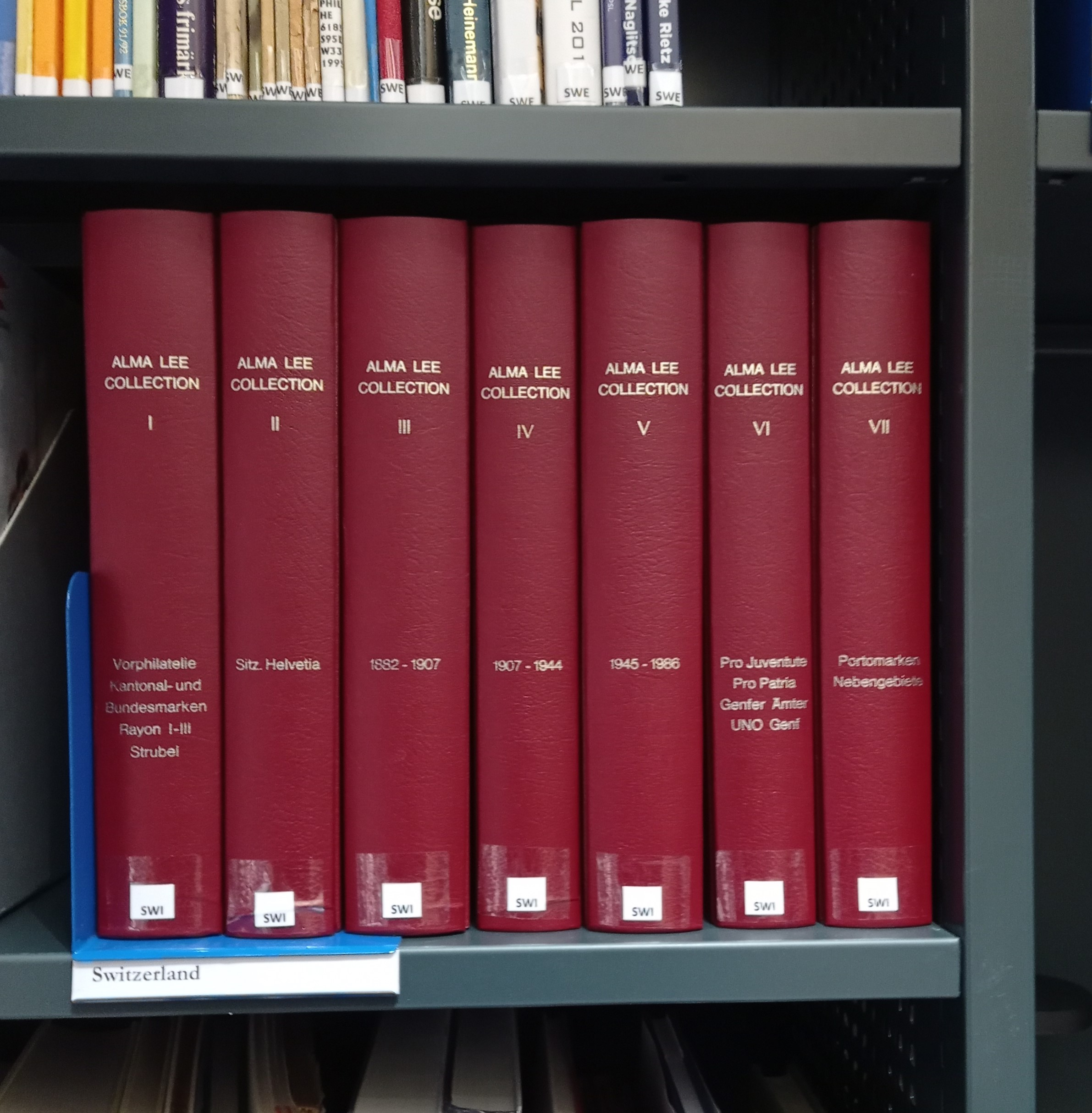
A bound copy of Alma Lee's Switzerland collection at the library of the Royal Philatelic Society, London.

=== Articles ===
- "Papers Adopted for the Stamps of Switzerland from 1854", The London Philatelist, Vol. 93, No. 1097-98 (1980), pp. 65–67.
- "An Outline of the Problems of the Postal History of Switzerland", The London Philatelist, Vol. 94, No. 1115-16 (1985), pp. 182–187.
- "Philatelic Knowledge & Rarity in Thematic Collections", The London Philatelist, Vol. 96, No. 1139-40 (1986), pp. 182–185.
- "International Jurors", The London Philatelist, Vol. 97, No. 1145-46 (1989), pp. 76–78.
- "The 'Zemstvo' Postage Stamps of Imperial Russia", The London Philatelist, Vol. 100, No. 1180 (1991), pp. 66–77.

=== Books ===
- Introducing Thematic Collecting. British Philatelic Trust in conjunction with the National Philatelic Society, 1983. (Edited by Richard West)
