= Alma Xóchil Cardona =

Mexican politician

- Born: 5 April 1966 (age 60); Tijuana, Baja California, Mexico
- Occupation: Politician
- Political party: PAN

Alma Xóchil Cardona Benavides (born 5 April 1966) is a Mexican politician from the National Action Party. From 2007 to 2009 she served as Deputy of the LX Legislature of the Mexican Congress representing Baja California.
