= Alma Allen (resistance member) =

Danish Resistance member during World War II

Alma Allen was a member of the Danish resistance against the Nazis in World War II in the early 1940s.

Allen was Danish but her husband was a pilot in the Royal Air Force. In 1941, she joined the Danish Resistance. In 1943, she commanded a unit of fifty men and women. Her unit attacked German installations. She personally led combat missions against the Nazis.

After the war, Allen joined British intelligence. She retired in 1968.
