= Alma Bazel Androzzo =

American songwriter

Alma Bazel Androzzo (17 October 1912 - 11 October 2001) was an American composer, pianist and songwriter.

== Biography ==
Alma Androzzo was born Alma Irene Bazel in Harriman, Tennessee, USA. She had no formal musical education but was introduced to the piano at the age of five by her father Carl Frederick Bazel, who was a truck driver.

Androzzo was brought up in Philadelphia where she graduated from high school.

In 1934, she married her first husband Andre Androzzo, who claimed to have been born in Morocco. Between 1934 and 1940 they lived in Pittsburgh, Pennsylvania. Her second marriage in 1957 was to a motor mechanic, Royal H Thompson, in Chicago.

Her most famous song If I can help somebody was first recorded by Turner Layton in 1946. Since then it has been recorded by many other artists including Gracie Fields, Billy Eckstein, Harry Secombe, Doris Day, Mahalia Jackson, Joseph Locke, Liberarce and Bryn Terfel.

She is buried in Mount Hope Cemetery, Chicago.

== Published songs ==
- If I can help somebody published by Boosey & Hawkes Ltd., London 1945
- Bless His name published by Martin and Morris Music Inc., Chicago Illinois 1950
- Keep marching on published by Martin and Morris Music Inc., Chicago Illinois 1950
- Deliver me from evil published by Martin and Morris Music Inc., Chicago Illinois 1950
- I'll make it somehow published by Martin and Morris Music Inc., Chicago Illinois 1950
- I will walk with Jesus published by Martin and Morris Music Studio, Chicago Illinois 1952
- He's such a great Saviour published by Martin and Morris Music Studio, Chicago Illinois c.1952
- Little me published by Hill and Range Songs Inc., New York City 1956
- Live in the sunlight published by Boosey & Hawkes, London 1964
- I have something to give copyright Alma Bazel Androzzo 17 January 1972
