= Alma Rosa Hernández Escobar =

Mexican politician (1956–2022)

Member of the Chamber of Deputies of Mexico
- In office 1 September 2021 – 5 June 2022

Personal details
- Born: 28 June 1956 Catemaco, Veracruz, Mexico
- Died: 5 June 2022 (aged 65) Córdoba, Veracruz, Mexico
- Party: PAN
- Education: Universidad del Golfo de México

Alma Rosa Hernández Escobar (Note: In this Mexican name, the surname is Hernández and the second or maternal family name is Escobar.) (28 June 1956 – 5 June 2022) was a Mexican politician affiliated with the National Action Party (PAN). She was a native of Catemaco, Veracruz.

From 2009 to 2012 she was a deputy in the Congress of Veracruz. In the 2021 mid-term election, she was elected to a plurinominal seat in the federal Chamber of Deputies for the duration of the 65th Congress (2021–2024).

Hernández died of a respiratory illness in Córdoba, Veracruz, on 5 June 2022 at the age of 65; she was replaced for the remainder of her congressional term by her alternate, Karla Verónica González Cruz.
