= Alma Jean Billingslea =

American scholar and teacher

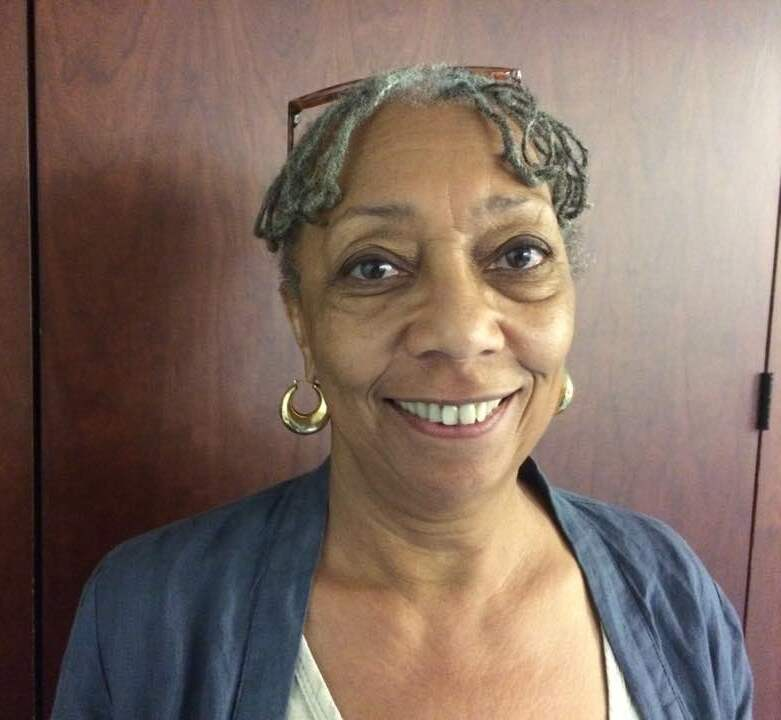
- Billingslea in 2016
- Born: 1946 (age 79–80); Albany, Georgia

Academic background
- Education: University of Texas at Dallas; Atlanta University; Rutgers University

Academic work
- Discipline: African diaspora
- Institutions: Spelman College

Alma Jean Billingslea (born 1946) is an American scholar and teacher, and a veteran of the civil rights movement.

Billingslea was born in Albany, Georgia, but grew up in Orange, New Jersey, where she was one of the first African American students to desegregate the Orange public school system. From 1967 to 1971, she worked as a field staff member for the Southern Christian Leadership Conference (SCLC), the organization founded by Martin Luther King, Jr. She is professor emerita and co-founder of the program in African Diaspora Studies at Spelman College in Atlanta, Georgia. She received the A.B. degree from Rutgers University, the M.A. degree from Atlanta University, and the PhD from the University of Texas at Dallas.

Billingslea is the author of Crossing Borders through Folklore: African American Women's Fiction and Art (University of Missouri Press, 1999).
