= Ronald A. Lee =

British philatelist

Ronald Albert George Lee (15 September 1912 – 10 March 1990) was a British philatelist who was added to the Roll of Distinguished Philatelists in 1965.

In the 1939 National Register Lee is described as an Assistant Factory Manager living in Willesden.
