= Alma Redlinger =

Romanian painter and illustrator (1924–2017)

Alma Redlinger (March 8, 1924 – February 2, 2017) was a painter and illustrator from Romania.

"Alma Redlinger has built a forward-looking career in its essence from the beginning. High-value, the artist's work proves an exceptional consistency and it is an example for those who have chosen art as a destiny. Alma Redlinger is part of artists generation which assure the continuity of interwar painting and contemporary painting." Octavian Barbosa, 1976

== Studies ==
She studied at the Academy of art school free Maxy, between 1940 and 1944, and in 1945 at the Academy of Art Guguianu, with the teacher and painter M.H. Maxy. She was a member of the Artists Union in Bucharest from 1951. From 1945 she exhibited at graphic painting salons and then at state art exhibitions. After 1969 she participated in decorative art exhibitions and monumental art works executed in 1959–1961, 1964.

== Personal exhibitions ==
- 1956, 1961, 1967 – Painting, Magheru B. Gallery
- 1970, 1975, 1978, 2002, 2004 – Painting, Simeza Gallery
- 1976 – Drawings, Theatre Tăndărică, Victoria Hall
- 1983, 1987, 1991 – Painting and Graphics, Orizont Gallery
- 1994 – Painting and Graphics, National Theatre, Bucharest
- 1998 – Graphics, Art House, Bucharest
- 1998 – Graphics, Club Junimea, Museum of Romanian Literature, Iași
- 2000 – Painting, Crown Plaza, Bucharest
- 2000 – Painting and Graphics, Frezia Gallery, Dej
- 2006 – "Atelier", Painting and Graphics, Veroniki Art Gallery, Bucharest
- 2007 – Military National Circle Gallery, Bucharest
- 2009 – Ana Gallery, Bucharest
- 2011 – Painting and Mixed Graphics, Dalles Hall Bucharest
- 2011 – Painting and Mixed Graphics Suceava History Museum

== Group exhibitions ==
- 1953 – World Youth Exhibition
- 1959–1960 Collective exhibition Belarus, Minsk, and Athens
- 1965 – Internationale Buchkunstausstellung, Leipzing
- 1971 – 3rd International Bienniale of sport art, Madrid
- 1973 – The 4th International Bienniale of Sport, Madrid
- 1973 – Estampe contemporaine, National Library, Paris
- 1977 – International Exhibition of Romanian fine arts, Helsinki
- 1981 – Miro International Art Exhibition, Barcelona
- 1981 – George Enescu reverential exhibition, Bacau
- 1982 – Romanian Art Exhibition, Vienna
- 1984 – Intregraphik Berlin
- 1986 – Nicolae Tonitza reverential exhibition, Barlad
- 1987 – Luchian reverential exhibition, Botoșani
- 1988 – Romanian contemporary graphics
- 1991 – Romanian graphics, Israel
- 1994 – Romanian Art Exhibition in China
- 2003 – Contemporary Romanian Art in Italy
- 2003 – Judische Kunst, Montabaur, Germania
- 2005 – Alma Redlinger "After 60 years," Allianz Tiriac Gallery

== Prizes ==
- 1945 – Anastase Simu Award;
- 1946 – Award of Fine Arts Ministry;
- 1959 – Mention of Mondial Festival of Youth;
- 1985 – Gold Medal of "Academia d'Italia delle Arti e delle Lavoro"
- 1985 – "Oscar d'Italia";
- 2004 – Order "Meritul cultural".
- 2006 – "Marcel Iancu award for Fine Arts
- 2011 – "Nihil Sine Deo" Medal offered by Michael of Romania

== Works in museums and collections-selection ==
- National Museum of Art of Romania,
- Bacau Art Museum,
- Timișoara Art Museum,
- Iasi Art Museum
- Galati Art Museum
- Art collection of the Royal House of Romania

== About Alma Redlinger ==
"The one that walks the halls of Alma Redlinger exhibition, is fascinated from the first moment of the safety, the vigor and the authority expression of this artist. The figure, a force that is given only by the synthesis ability, gives greatness to some works that are not exceeding a few tens of centimeters. Two or three flat color patches give works relief, and the viewer the feeling that everything that had to be said was said. No unnecessary detail, any element "for beauty" does not disturb these images, which remain in memory long after you've seen it. In painting, drawing or collage, in the final works or drawings, Alma Redlinger is the same sober and personal artist, foreign to attractive show or complacent. In earlier paintings, compositions, still life and flowers, cubist severity intuition has made its mark. By the 70s, or even earlier, when others were trying to find Cubism, Alma Redlinger was already doing synthesis in this spirit (...)" Radu Ionescu

(...) During a life time dedicated to creation, Alma Redlinger has built an unmistakable style. Modernism, part of the plastic idiom circulated in her paintings, has deep roots, "which come from far away". The creative solutions of cubism, of the constructivism, of the expressionism and fauvism were deposited in plastic structures proposed by Alma Redlinger, like the pearl in the sea shell. In this way, of cultural assimilation, the above-mentioned solutions provides reasoning and preciousness for the paintings thatwe already admired for a long time. Above all, we like tense dialogue, polemical, yet not without a secret threat waged between graphical and chromatic structures ... Her painting style has built, I think, as a result of this strategy of delay, of the orpheic"taming" of image sources themselves. So that the drawing gestural "clamour" almost always seeks its haven in solemn sounds of purple, or of the green which borrowed the effect of forest mossvelvet, as in a neighbor canvas, the chromatic "clamour" is fixed, as the alchemical mercury in the design of stained glass network. Alma Redlinger is the silent chronicler, patient and inspiring of this tournament without end. Following the creative effort, she manages to capture and tell us essential sequences of a perpetual genesis, during which the image occurs. Cristian Robert Velescu

(...)On March 16, at the Dalles hall, took place the exhibition of Alma Redlinger. The visitoris found from the entrance, under the impact of the images, impressed by the magnitude and beauty that the figures shapes or objects included in her compositions gets. There is a self-portrait in the exhibition from 2010.The movement full of enthusiasm of the author seems to cause, through the simpleact of painting, a real earthquake of the surrounding forms, imposing unexpected pitches or displacements, like a monarch who prints his will over his empire (in this case the painted canvas). Each work is a reversal " of public order ", through plans synthesis and their unexpected blend, by highlighting their key directions, their way to meet and separate. The stunning range of floral images completes the great vitality image of artist vision, by the power of transforming small items in essential cells of existence. Here, as in her large figurative compositions, the welding between objects and environment, is transformed into a unitary structure, a larger structure cell. Yvonne Hasan

== Bibliography ==
- Dicționarul artistilor români contemporani – Octavian BARBOSA – Editura Meridiane – 1976/Octavian Barbosa, Dictionary of contemporary Romanian artists, Meridians House, Bucharest, 1976;
- Ideé et sensibilité – Dan GRIGORESCU – L'art roumain contamporain – direction et tendence – Édition Meridiane – 1991;
- Album Alma Redlinger, Editura Master Print, 2009, album îngrijit de Daria Simion și Vasile Petrovici
- Enciclopedia artiștilor români contemorani – Vasile FLOREA, s.a. – editura ARC 2000
- Claus Stephani: Ziehtochter der Avantgarde. Alma Redlinger hat rumänische Kunsttradition über den Sozialistischen Realismus herübergerettet. In: Kulturpolitische Korrespondenz (Bonn), no. 1155, 10.9.2002, p. 21-22
- Revista AnticArtMagazin, aprilie, 2007 pag.24,25, număr dedicat artistei Alma Redlinger
- Maria-Magdalena CRISAN, Observator Cultural 13-19 iulie 2006, nr. 329
- Catalogul Expozitiei Alma Redlinger, Galeria Cercului Militar National, Bucuresti, 2007/Exhibition catalog Alma Redlinger, Military National Circle Gallery, Bucharest, 2007
- Alma Redlinger, Dicționar de artă modernă și contemporană, Constantin Prut (ediție imbunătățită) Ed. Univers Enciclopedic 2002/Alma Redlinger, Dictionary of modern and contemporary art, Constantin Prut (updated edition) Edited by Encyclopedic Universe 2002
- Alma Redlinger, Lexiconul: Pictori, Sculptori și Desenatori români, de Mircea Deac, Ed. Medro
- Alma Redlinger, Catalogul Expoziției "Atelier", Galeria Veroniki Art, București, 2006
- Alma Redlinger, Albumul Atelierul Internațional de creație Feminină Contemporană, Editura A. I. C. F. C. 2008
- Alma Redlinger, Catalogul Expoziției personale de pictură, Galeria Artelor, Cercul Militar Național, București, 2007/Exhibition catalogue of Alma Redlinger, Military National Circle Gallery, Bucharest, 2007;
- Claus Stephani: Das Bild des Juden in der modernen Malerei. Eine Einführung. / Imaginea evreului în pictura modernă. Studiu introductiv. Traducere în limba română de Ion Peleanu. (Zweisprachige Ausgabe, deutsch-rumänisch. Ediţie bilingvă, româno-germană.) Editura Hasefer: București, 2005. ISBN 973-630-091-9
- Catalogul Expoziției Alma Redlinger, Sala Dalles, București, Editura UNARTE, 2011, curator Adrian Buga/Alma Redlinger Exhibition Catalogue, Dalles Hall, Bucharest, Edited by UNARTE, 2011 curator Adrian Buga
