= Alma Jordan =

Irish farm safety advocate

- Born: County Kildare
- Occupations: Social entrepreneur, safety advocate, farmer
- Organisation: AgriKids
- Known for: Farm safety

Alma Jordan is an Irish social entrepreneur and advocate for agricultural safety and health. In 2014, she founded AgriKids with the purpose of educating children about farm safety. She is also the author of Tales from Riverside Farm, a children's book series.

== Biography ==
Jordan grew up on a farm in County Kildare. She recalls her father suffering from multiple farming related injuries when she was a child, including a facial injury from being kicked by a foal. After completing her Leaving Cert, she was employed across multiple marketing and communications firms.

In 2015, Jordan founded the social enterprise AgriKids with the purpose of teaching farm safety to kids. She cites the number of farming accidents in 2014 as a motivating factor, with 32 total deaths, 5 of which were children. Jordan observed how recycling education programmes would resonate with school age kids and reasoned she could instill a similar excitement for farm safety through tractors and farm animals. Another goal of AgriKids is to have kids share what they've learned with their parents. Jordan notes this in the name of the organization: "The important ingredient here is the fact that they bring that message home... and that's why it's AgriKids, not AgriAdults."

Through AgriKids, Jordan has written a series a children's novels focused on farm safety entitled Tales from Riverside Farm. After initial publication, a local librarian asked Jordan to run a workshop on agricultural safety, and the ongoing workshops have since been presented to over 25,000 students. AgriKids use of educational material and books is called out as an effective tool to reach the "diverse farming audience".

== Awards and honors ==
- In 2016, Jordan was named Business Woman of the Year by Network Ireland for launching AgriKids
- In 2019, Jordan was selected as a winner of the Social Entrepreneurs Ireland award for being a "high potential social entrepreneur"
- In 2024, Jordan was honored as one of "100 women making their mark in Ireland and beyond" by the Irish Examiner
