= Alma Wagen =

American mountain guide

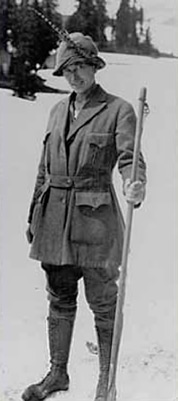
Alma Wagen, circa 1920

Alma Wagen (1878 – December 7, 1967) was an American mountain guide on Mount Rainier. She was the first female guide employed by Mount Rainier National Park.

== Biography ==
Wagen was born in 1878 and raised in Mankato, Minnesota. She began climbing at a young age but, in the absence of any mountains in her area, she climbed the windmill at her grandparents’ farm and became known locally as "the windmill climber". After graduating from the University of Minnesota in 1903, she moved to Tacoma, Washington. She worked at Stadium High School as a mathematics teacher and in her spare time she climbed extensively in the North Cascades and Olympic Mountains.

Wagen became an official member of The Mountaineers in 1913. In 1914, she traveled to Glacier National Park where she "found [her] life's work right in the National Parks" and climbed Mount Rainier for the first time in 1915. She spent the summer of 1916 hiking in Yellowstone National Park and in 1917 she climbed Mount Adams, Mount St. Helens and Mount Hood with the Mountaineers. When the United States joined World War I, this created a shortage of mountain guides, and Wagen joined the National Park Service as a guide in 1918. She was the first female guide to work in Mount Rainier National Park. The bulk of her work as a guide consisted of leading tourists on hikes to nearby glaciers, but she occasionally assisted in leading parties to the mountain's summit, which she was said to have done "like a master". Joseph Hazard, Rainier's chief climbing guide at the time, referred to Wagen as "one of the best guides in the employ of the company". She worked in Yosemite National Park briefly in 1922 before returning to Rainier.

Wagen retired after marrying Horace J. Whitacre in Tacoma. She moved to Claremont, California after Whitacre's death in 1944 and lived there until her death in 1967.
