= Eloise Alma Flagg =

First African American woman principal in Newark

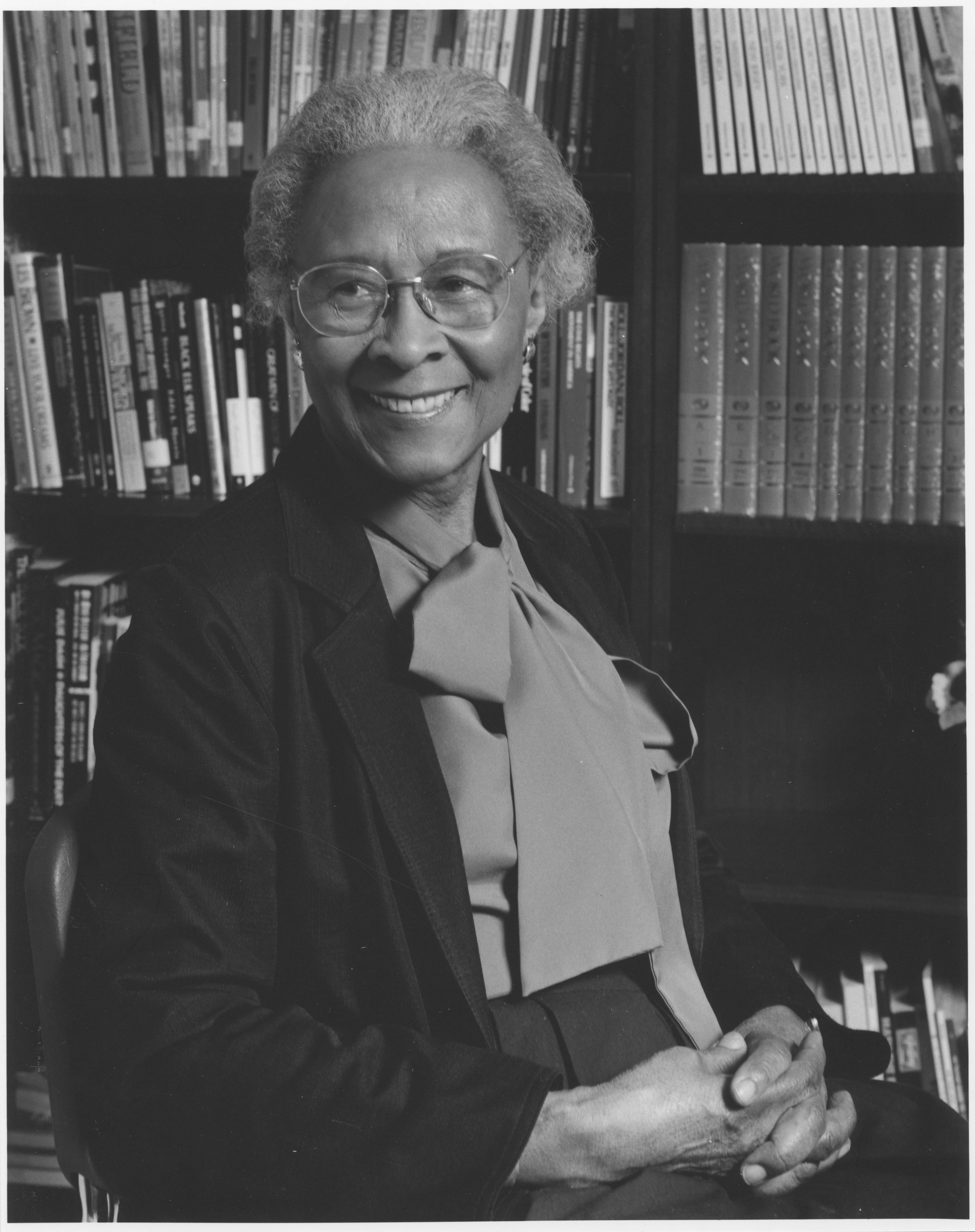
- Born: Eloise Alma Williams; September 16, 1918; Virginia, U.S.
- Died: March 10, 2018 (aged 99); Newark, New Jersey, U.S.
- Occupation: School principal

Eloise Alma Williams Flagg (September 16, 1918 – March 10, 2018) was the first African-American woman to be a school principal in Newark, New Jersey and the first African-American principal in a racially integrated school in Newark. Alma Flagg Elementary School in Newark is named in her honor.

== Early life ==
Flagg was born as Eloise Alma Williams on September 16, 1918 in Virginia to Hannibal and Caroline Williams. She lived most of her life in Newark, New Jersey. She attended East Side High School and graduated in January 1935. She graduated Newark State College (since renamed as Kean University) with a Bachelor's, Montclair State University with a Master's, and Teachers College, Columbia University with a doctorate in education. In 1942 she married J. Thomas Flagg and in 1943 became one of sixteen black teachers employed by Newark.

== Appointment as principal ==
There had been no African American principal in Newark since James M. Baxter who was principal of the "Colored School", and retired in 1909. In 1958-1959, exams were conducted for vacant vice principalship positions. Four African American teachers including Dr. Flagg protested the exams in a racial bias suit as having "prejudiced the rankings of Negro candidates". In 1963, a judge dismissed the case for "lack of probable cause". The Committee for Equality for Education pressured the Board for change. Flagg wrote, "I maintain that discrimination against Negroes in the area of promotions in the Newark school system has existed and, to this moment, has operated to the detriment of the complainants and others".

In 1963, Flagg was appointed vice principal at Garfield Elementary School. In 1964, Flagg was placed second on the list of principal candidates. She was appointed principal of Hawkins Street School becoming the first African American female principal.

== Later life ==
In 1967, Flagg became assistant superintendent in charge of curriculum services for Newark. Throughout her life Flagg also wrote poetry, self published books of her poetry and was active in the community. Flagg held the assistant superintendent position until she retired in 1983. Flagg remained a presence in the Newark community. She established the E. Alma Flagg Scholarship Fund. She was active in the Newark Preservation and Landmarks Committee. In 1995, E. Alma Flagg Elementary School was named in her honor, and she was saluted in the House by Rep. Donald M. Payne. She died March 10, 2018.
