= Alma Vītola =

Latvian ultra marathon runner (born 1992)

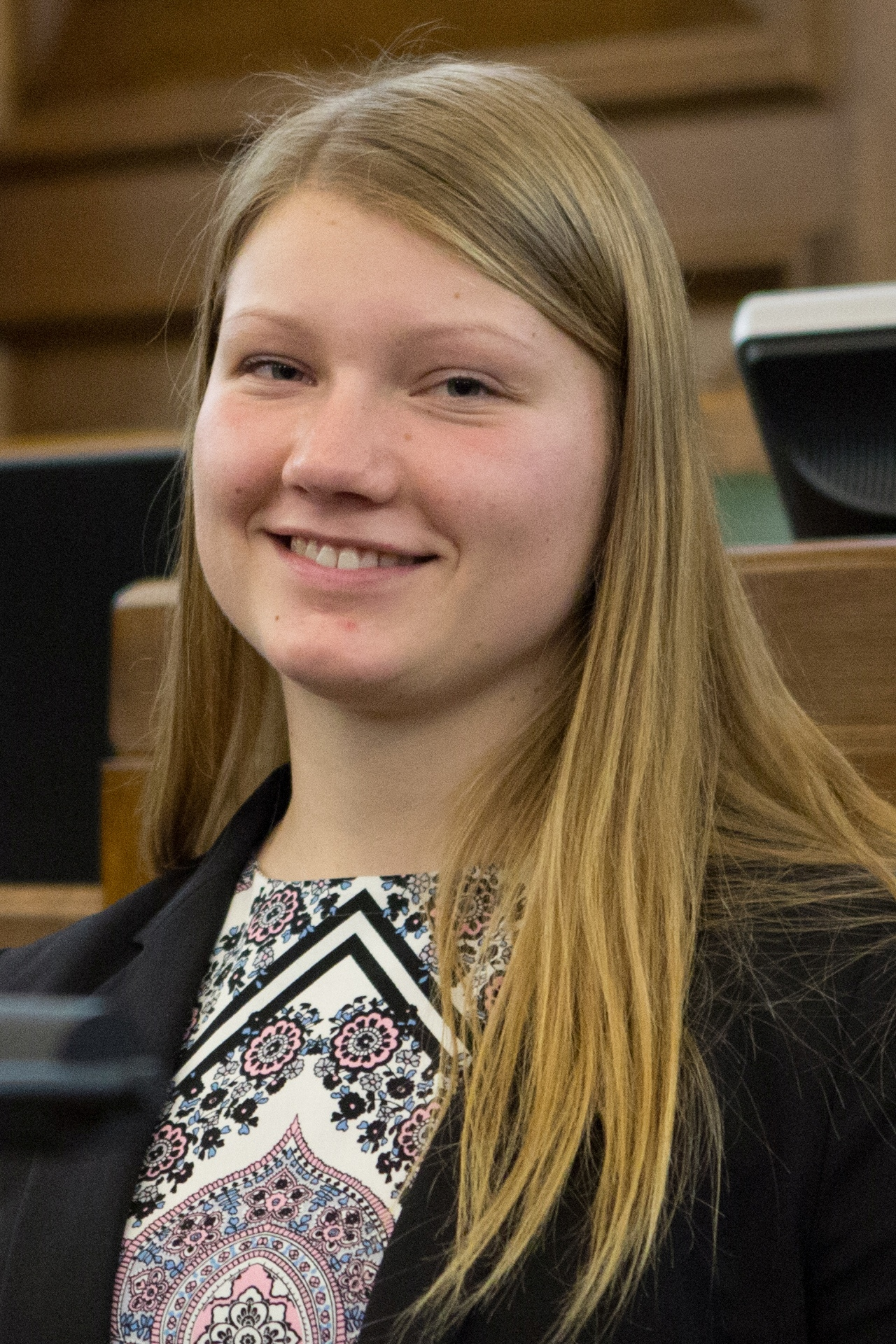
Alma Vītola in 2015

Alma Vītola (born 1992) is a Latvian ultra marathon runner.
