= Alma Detthow =

Swedish educator and school founder

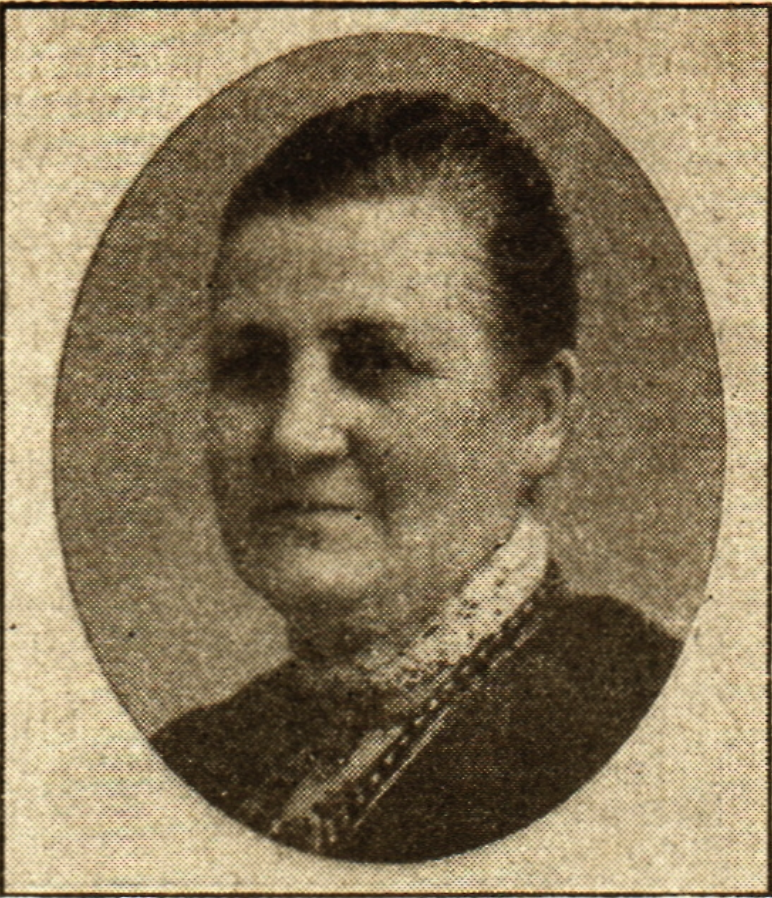
- Alma Detthow in 1910
- Born: Alma Fredrika Mathilda Detthow; 25 November 1855; Stockholm, Sweden
- Died: 14 July 1937 (aged 81); Františkovy Lázně, Czech Republic
- Occupations: Educator; school founder
- Mother: Charlotta Matilda Gaurde
- Relatives: Rudolf Theodor Detthow (half-brother)

Alma Fredrika Mathilda Detthow (25 November 1855 – 14 July 1937) was a Swedish educator and school founder. She established the Detthow School in 1896, and served its principal until 1925. The school emerged as a prototype for offering equivalent academic programmes to both boys and girls. She was awarded the Swedish royal medal Illis quorum in 1929 for her significant contributions in the field of school education.

== Life ==
Alma Detthow was born on 25 November 1855 in Södermalm in central Stockholm, Sweden to an unmarried mother. Her mother, Charlotta Matilda Gaurde, was a seamstress. The identity of Detthow's biological father remains unknown. Born into poverty, she lived with her mother and her half-brother, Rudolf Theodor Detthow. Detthow spent her childhood at the residence of her mother's foster mother Lovisa Christina Nordström. In mid-1860s, she was registered on her birth certificate as Detthow. At the age of 14, she attended the Adolf Fredrik school, graduating in 1870. At age 16, she worked as part-time schoolteacher at her alma mater and later at the Kungsholm school. In 1873, she entered a teacher training school in Stockholm, where she remained for three years. During this time, she taught as a standby teacher at various schools in Stockholm. Following her graduation in 1873, she was appointed as an assistant schoolteacher at Stockholm's Maria school, where she worked until 1879. Shortly after leaving the post, she was appointed at a teacher-training school that was founded by Johan Löfvén. She also taught mathematics at the Ateneum and Brummer schools. Following an illness in 1895, she was forced to the teacher training school the following year.

Detthow established her own training school the Detthow School, in the autumn of 1896. Initially starting with a small number of students, the school was primarily used as a test school for a complementary private training school that was founded by Detthow the same year. The numbers of students increased during the 1910s to 600. The lower grades functioned as a co-ed, while the upper classes were open only to female students. As the school's principal, she made progressive reforms to the school's infrastructure and introduced two new sections between 1903 and 1904. The sections adopted the teaching programmes that were followed by other girls' schools and secondary boys' schools. Under Detthow's administration, the institution became an exemplary school for offering equivalent academic programmes to both boys and girls. The school was granted permission to hold secondary examinations in 1908.

In 1925, Detthow retired from the post of headmistress of the institution, and the following year, she established the Alma Detthow Foundation retirement home. In 1927, she founded the Alma Detthow Foundation, and in 1935, she established the Alma Detthow assistance fund. In 1929, she was honoured with the Swedish royal medal Illis quorum, for her significant contributions in the field of school education.

Detthow died in Františkovy Lázně, Czech Republic, on 14 July 1937.
