= Alma Hjelt =

Finnish feminist (1853–1907)

Alma Hjelt (1853-1907), was a Finnish gymnast and women's rights activist. In 1884, she became the first chairperson of the first women's organisation in Finland.

She was the daughter of the politician Nils Hjelt. In 1884, the Suomen Naisyhdistyksen, the first organisation for women's rights were founded in Helsinki in Finland by Alexandra Gripenberg, and Alma Hjelt became its first chairman. The purpose of the organisation was to work for access of the same cultural and political rights for women as for men. After 1886, branches of the organisation was founded in other parts of Finland, the first being the one in Kuopio headed by Minna Canth.

In her will, she founded a scholarship for females wishing to study medicine; it also provided funds for Finnish females to study medicine abroad, should they in the future be barred from study medicine in Finland.
