= Alma Johanna Ruubel =

Estonian mathematician

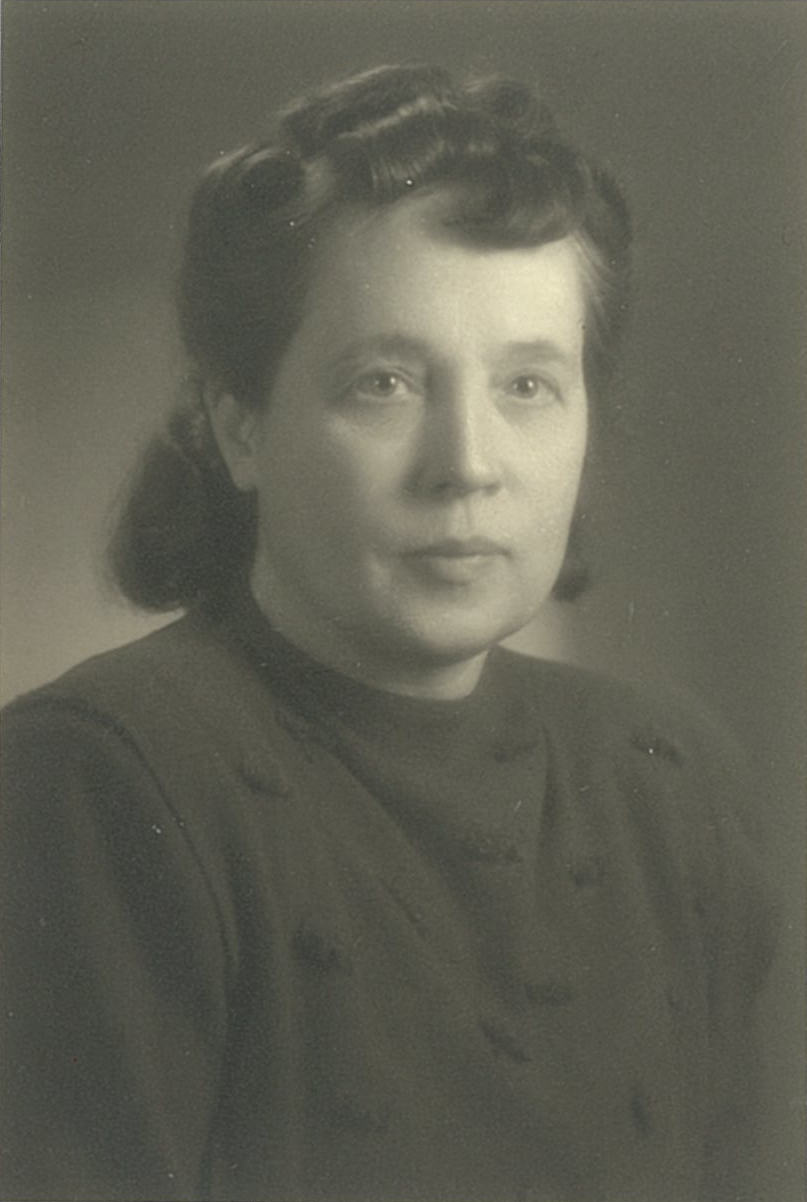
- Born: 28 September 1899; Õisu Parish, Governorate of Livonia, Russian Empire
- Died: 21 January 1990 (aged 90); Tartu, then part of Estonian SSR, Soviet Union
- Burial place: Vana-Jaani cemetery, Tartu
- Education: University of Tartu
- Occupations: Mathematician and professor
- Known for: Curvilinear representational geometry

Alma Johanna Ruubel (28 September 1899 – 21 January 1990) was an Estonian mathematician and professor engaged in the development of curvilinear representational geometry.

== Life and work ==
Alma Johanna Ruubel was born in Õisu Parish (present-day Viljandi Parish), Viljandi County, and grew up on the Peebu farm in the Ōisu municipality of Viljandimaa. Her father, Juhan Ruubel, was a master builder and joiner and her mother Ann (née Mankin) was a housewife.

In 1909, she entered the three-grade Russian-language Peebu school in Õisu Parish and in 1912, the Viljandi Estonian Educational Society's Estonian-language girls' school from which she graduated in 1916. She continued her studies at the Russian-language Viljandi Girls' High School, which was converted into a seven-grade school during World War I and the German occupation in 1918. In order to continue her studies, Ruubel, together with other girls, formed a group of students of the eighth-grade course, which invited separate teachers. With the end of the German occupation, Viljandi City Girls' High School started working in Viljandi, and Alma's group was included in the eighth grade of the school there. Upon its completion in 1919, Ruubel was allowed to enter a university.

She entered the summer teacher preparation courses organized by the University of Tartu (TRÜ), and in August 1919 she was already selected as a mathematics teacher at the Pärnu Commercial School. From the next school year, she worked as a teacher in her old school in Viljandi. Ruubel also continued her studies in the courses held at the university and finished them in 1921.

=== University student ===
She officially entered the University of Tartu in 1926. At first, she earned money by giving tutoring lessons, but in 1929 Professor Gerhard Rägo invited her to become an assistant at the Institute of Mathematics, even though she was only a third-year student. With this, Ruubel became the first female lecturer in mathematics at the University of Tartu. In 1932, she graduated cum laude.

In 1935, she wanted to start research related to numerical and graphical methods. Professor Rägo recommended to her John Couch Adams's method of numerical integration of differential equations and Richard von Mises's recently published error estimation approach to that method. Rägo considered her finished research suitable for submission as a master's thesis. Ruubel received her master's degree in mathematics in 1936. Her thesis, "The JC Adams Method for the Numerical Integration of Ordinary Differential Equations," was recertified in 1946 and she was awarded a Ph.D. in Physics and Mathematics.

=== Teacher ===
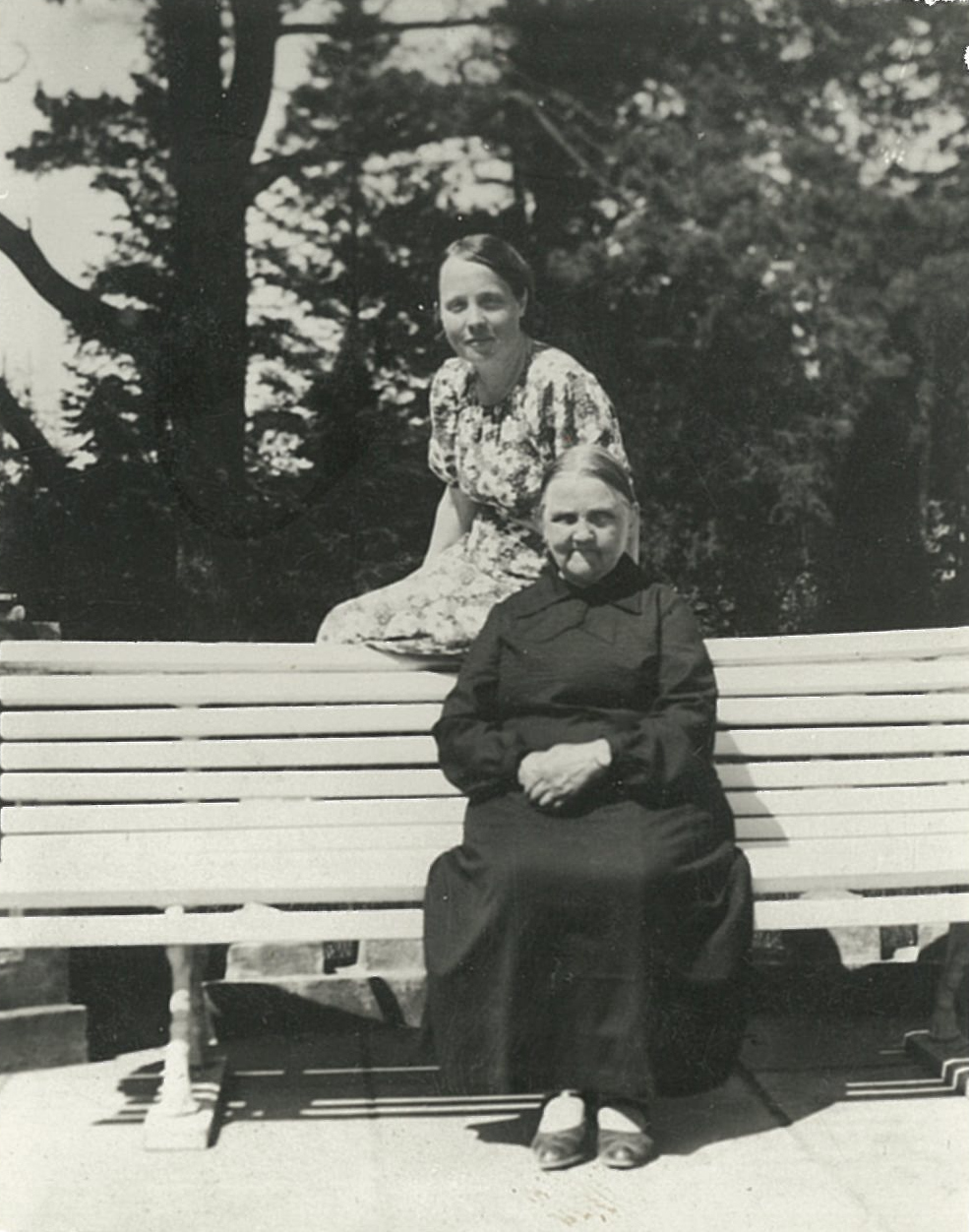
Ruubel with her mother Ann c. 1930

After graduating from the university, Ruubel continued to work there, first as a senior teacher and later as an associate professor (appointed in 1949). She taught theoretical mechanics, applied mathematics, computational and graphical methods, probability theory, analytical, differential and representational geometry, and higher mathematics. She also worked in leading positions, being the head of the department, the vice-dean and dean of the Faculty of Mathematics and Natural Sciences, the supervisor of the postgraduate course and the head of the methodological council.

In 1952, the department of visual geometry of the Estonian Academy of Agriculture was opened, and Ruubel was invited to head it. This allowed her to focus on her subject. At the same time, she continued to work at TRÜ as an associate professor until 1955. Later, in 1969, she was invited to be a member of the Scientific Council of the Faculty of Mathematics of TRÜ for another three years.

Ruubel's work at the university led her to establish a new branch of mathematics, namely curvilinear representational geometry. She spoke at many scientific conferences in Moscow, Leningrad, Tallinn as well as Tartu to introduce it and publish brochures and articles. After the Department of Visual Geometry and Graphics was merged with other departments, she worked until her retirement in 1968 as an Associate Professor of the Combined Department and headed the Section of Visual Geometry and Graphics. As a pensioner, she gave lectures from time to time and participated in the organization of educational methodological work until 1973.

Alma Ruubel died in 1990 In Tartu on the same day as mathematician John Couch Adams. She is buried in the Vana-Jaani cemetery in Tartu.

== Research ==
Ruubel's areas of research: curvilinear projection methods, their properties and applications, graphical and mechanical integration of differential equations and application of projection methods in visual geometry. She was one of the founders of the curvilinear projection direction.

She published articles in cooperation with professor Sinaiida Riives, who was her colleague in the department of visual geometry of the Estonian Academy of Agriculture.

== Selected works ==
- Orthogonal circular projection. Tartu, 1958
- Complex drawings of curve projections. Tartu, 1961
- Generalized axonometry. Tartu, 1967
- School mathematics 1. Tartu, 1979.
