= Alma Downes Shaw =

English medical missionary doctor (1893–1969)

Alma Downes Shaw (22 September 1893 – 14 December 1969) was an English medical missionary doctor of the Church Missionary Society who founded and built the Mombasa Hospital for Women and Children. She subsequently worked at the Church Missionary Society Hospital at Kaloleni for 22 years. She initiated medical services for the Indian population living in Kenya. She was not just known for her medical and religious work, but also for making improvements to areas like a "nurses' home, new wards, a sanitary block, etc."

Prior to her missionary work, Shaw advocated for women to be permitted to study medicine alongside their male counterparts at The London Hospital Medical College in 1922.

== Biography ==
Alma Downes Shaw was born in Kew, London Borough of Richmond upon Thames, Greater London, England. Shaw was the daughter of Rev. Archibald Downes Shaw her father, and Alice Shaw, her mother. Her father was a missionary and built St. Paul's Church in Rabai, Kenya. She studied at King's College London from 1919 to 1922.

== Mission ==
=== Uganda ===
Shaw began her missionary journey in 1926, aiming to spread her knowledge of medicine and her faith at the Mengo Hospital in Uganda. She worked there for 5 years under the guidance of Dr. Sir Albert Cook. Dr. Cook was also a medical missionary and a member of the Church Missionary Society. During her time at Mengo Hospital, Shaw petitioned the Mission Committee Uganda to begin a dispensary for the Kampala Indians.

In 1932, Shaw was transferred to the Ngora Hospital with the Upper Nile Mission.

=== Building the Mombasa Hospital for Women and Children ===
In 1934, Shaw was transferred to the CMS Kenya Mission to open the Mission Hospital for Women and Children in Mombasa. Her work focused on the Indian population of Mombasa. Her hospital was also referred to as the "Mombasa Hospital for Indians". She started with just a bicycle and a rented room to use as an out-patients' clinic and grew it to a 2-bed in-patient facility. Over time, Alma continued to advance her work on the hospital, ultimately ending with 3 flats and a 28-bed facility. In 1942, the hospital provided more than 27000 visits and had 20 staff members.

Shaw led the Mombasa Hospital for Women and Children until 1944. Dr. Kathleen Warren took over the work on Shaw's departure. In 1944, due to financial challenges during the war and tensions regarding the Indian/Asian populations, the Mombasa Hospital was financially separated from the CMS and government support. Separate associations were formed to take over the hospitals.

=== Additional work in Kenya ===
After this, she had a reprieve from the Kenya Mission and was lent to the Church of Scotland Mission. She worked at the Kikuyu Hospital for 9 months. This did not last very long, and she then moved to the CMS hospital in Kaloleni, Kenya. For 22 years, she gained popularity for her medical skill and her evangelistic work. While in Kenya, she also set up nurses' homes, new wards, sanitary blocks, and other improvements to the community.

In 1957, she moved back to Mombasa, where she first started, to continue her medical missionary work.

=== Work in Nigeria and Tanganyika ===
She planned to retire on 20 March 1960 and move back to England. However, she was alerted to the need for a doctor in Nigeria and could not contain herself. She moved among hospitals in Africa in places such as Nigeria, Kenya and Tanganyika, where she finally retired.

She died on 14 December 1969, in Mombasa, Kenya.
