= Alma Hirsig Bliss =

American miniature painter

- Born: 1875; Trachselwald, Bern, Switzerland
- Died: July 18, 1964 (aged 88–89); Kingston, New York, USA
- Partner: Louis Bliss

Alma Hirsig Bliss (1875 – 1964) was an American miniature painter. Her work is included in the collections of the Smithsonian American Art Museum, the Metropolitan Museum of Arts, and the Brooklyn Museum.

She was born as Alma Hirsig to her father Gottlieb Hirsig (1844-1933), innkeeper at Trachselwald, Switzerland, and her mother Magdalena Luginbühl (1845-1923). After their divorce in 1885 the mother emigrated to New York with her six daughters, the youngest among them being Leah Hirsig.

Bliss studied with Willard Metcalf, Robert Reid, and Volk and Theodora Thayer in New York and with René-Xavier Prinet, Gustave-Claude-Etienne Courtois, and Gabrielle Debillemont-Chardon, the President of the Société des Femmes Peintres et Sculpteurs and of the Société des Miniaturistes et des Arts Precieux, in Paris. Her "Young Girl" won the Medal of honor at the 26th annual exhibition of the California Society of Miniature Painters at Los Angeles Museum in 1938.
