= Alma Bećirović =

Bosnian filmmaker and theatre director

Alma Bećirović is a Bosnian filmmaker and theatre director born in Sarajevo.

== Biography ==
She won several awards for her short feature films and documentaries, including Best Screenplay at the Göteborg International Film Festival for the short feature film On Wednesdays in CineBosnia selection and Best Short Feature film at the Torino Film Festival for the same film. Award of Germany Ministry of Culture for the documentary film Survived and Lived Through One More Day at the Internationale Kurzfilmtage Oberhausen.

Her films have been part of the official selection at Tribeca Film Festival New York, LA Film Festival, Mediterranean Short Film Festival Of Tangier, Thessaloniki International Film Festival, Wiesbaden Film Festival, Motovun Film Festival and many others.

Her documentary film Survived and Lived Through One More Day was a part of both group and individual exhibitions at the Tate Modern, The Kitchen gallery in New York, Stedelijk Museum Amsterdam, Museo Nacional Centro de Arte Reina Sofia Madrid.

She directed several theatre plays such as Top Girls by Caryl Churchill at the National Theatre in Sarajevo and John Smith, princess of Walesa by Tomislav Zajec co-production between Academy of Performing Arts Sarajevo and Chamber Theatre 55.

She directed several TV commercials for leading Balkans brands as well as TV idents.

Alma currently lives in London, and works in the field of Digital technology and Innovation.
