= A. B. Cull =

English marine painter

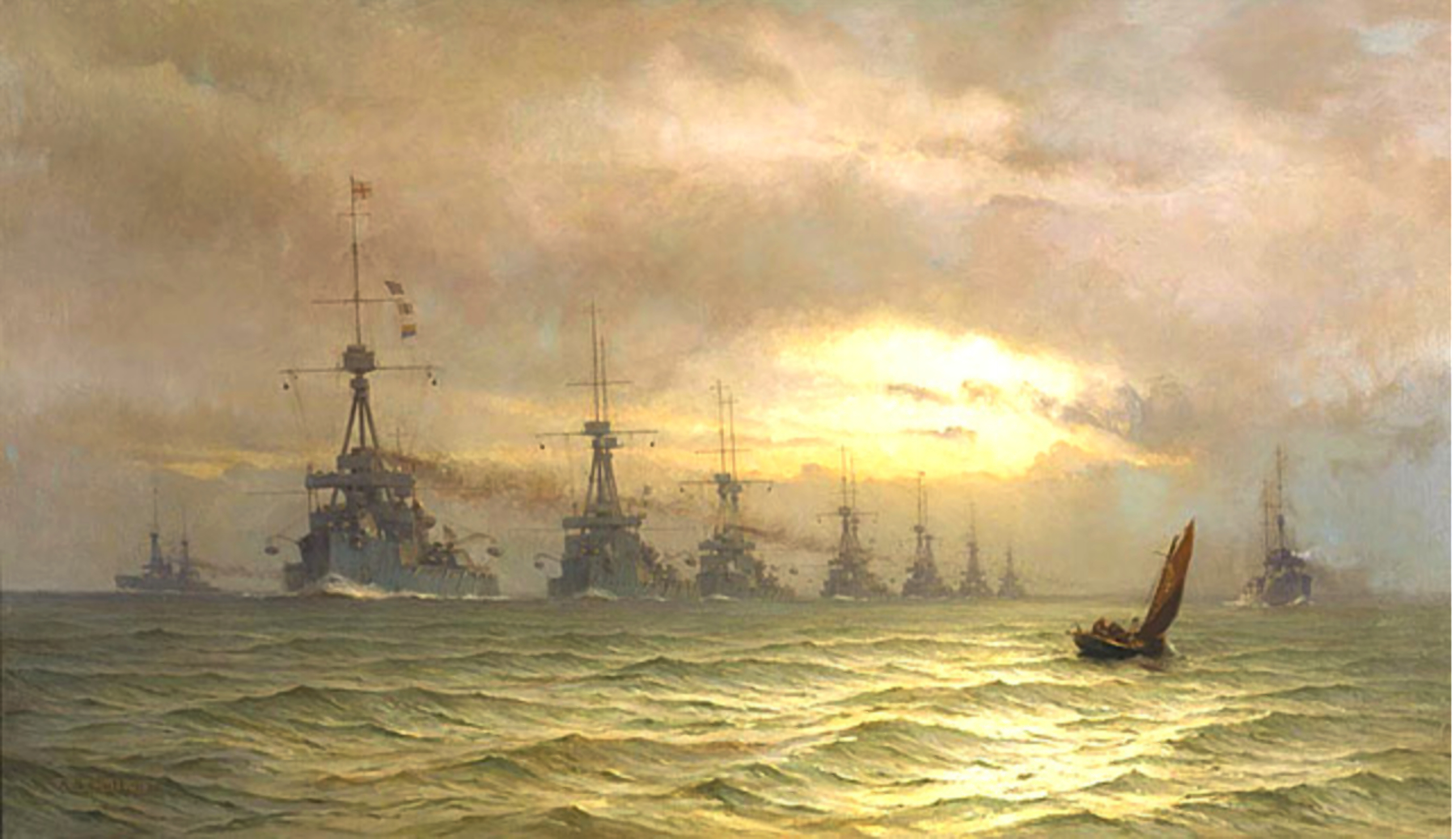
"The First Battle Squadron of Dreadnoughts" (1910)

Alma Claude Burlton Cull (1880–1931) was an English marine painter who worked in watercolours and oils. He specialised in painting Royal Navy ships.

Cull exhibited at the Royal Academy, the Royal Institute of Painters in Watercolours, the Walker Art Gallery and the London Salon. In his retirement he lived at Lee-on-the-Solent in Hampshire; his widow continuing to live there after 1931. For safekeeping she stored his unsold works in his studio in Old Portsmouth, where they were destroyed by enemy bombs in 1940 during the Second World War. Some of his work is exhibited at the National Maritime Museum in Greenwich.

Cull was a contemporary of the prolific William Lionel Wyllie RA. Cull's paintings are much rarer than those by Wyllie and are regarded as being on a par with Wyllie's. King Edward VII commissioned some of his paintings. Cull paintings are sought after and only occasionally appear at auctions.
