= Roseline =

Roseline is a given name. Notable people with the name include:

- Roseline Chepngetich (born 1997), Kenyan steeplechase runner
- Roseline Delisle (1952–2003), Canadian ceramic artist
- Roseline Éloissaint (born 1999), Haitian footballer
- Roseline Filion (born 1987), retired Canadian diver
- Roseline Fonkwa (born 1975), Cameroonian movie producer and businesswoman
- Roseline Granet (born 1936), French sculptor and painter
- Roseline Konya, academic and a politician from Khana, Rivers State
- Annie Marie Roseline Gatienne Moniqui (born 1990), Canadian weightlifter
- Roseline Omotosho (died 1999), Nigerian judge
- Roseline Osipitan, Nigerian business executive and Yoruba princess
- Roseline Emma Rasolovoahangy, candidate in the Madagascar presidential elections of 2013 and 2018
- Roseline Ukeje (born 1943), Nigerian jurist, the first female Chief Judge of the High Court of Nigeria
- Roseline Vachetta (born 1951), French Trotskyist politician
- Roseline of Villeneuve (1263–1329), French Carthusian nun and saint
- Rose line

== See also ==
- Rosaleen
- Rosalina (disambiguation)
- Rosaline
- Rosalyn (disambiguation)
- Rosellini
- Rosolin
- Rosolina
- Rosolini
- Rossellini
- Rossellino
- Rosslyn (disambiguation)
- Rozalin (disambiguation)
- Rozalén
- Rusalina
