= Rosellini =

Rosellini is a surname. Notable people with the surname include:

- Albert Rosellini (1910–2011), former governor of Washington State, U.S.
- Anne Rosellini, American film producer and screenwriter
- Ferdinando Pio Rosellini (1814-1872), Italian mathematician and botanist, brother of Ippolito
- Hugh J. Rosellini (1909–1984), American lawyer, politician, and justice
- Ippolito Rosellini (1800–1843), Italian Egyptologist, brother of Ferdinando Pio
- John M. Rosellini (born 1939), American former politician
- Nicoletta Rosellini (born 1991), Italian singer
- Stevie Rosellini, character played by James Belushi in the 1999 film Angel's Dance
- Victor Rosellini (1915–2003), American restauranteur

== See also ==
- Governor Albert D. Rosellini Bridge, a bridge in King County, Washington, U.S.
- Rossellini
- Bernardo Rossellino
