= John M. Rosellini =

American politician

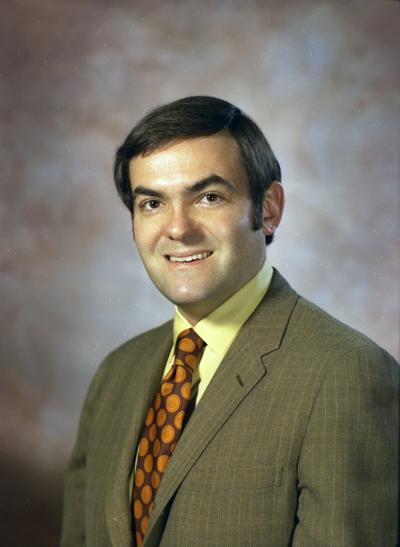
- Rosellini in 1971

Member of the Washington House of Representatives for the 34th district
- In office 1967–1973

Personal details
- Born: 1939 (age 86–87) Seattle, Washington, United States
- Party: Democratic
- Occupation: attorney

John M. Rosellini (born 1939) is an American former politician in the state of Washington. He served in the Washington House of Representatives from 1967 to 1973, representing Washington's 34th legislative district. Born in the city of Seattle, he was an alumnus of Washington State University, and Gonzaga University School of Law.

Rosellini was admitted to the bar in 1973. In May 1977, while he had been employed to probate the estate of Voyena Brandt, he received $10,000 in a trust fund, which Brandt's two children were supposed to eventually receive. However, he proceeded to withdraw from it 13 times between July 1977 and March 1978 for personal use. As a result, he was disbarred by the Washington Supreme Court on May 20, 1982. In February 1986, he went before the Washington Bar Association to plead to be readmitted to the bar.
