= Rossellini =

Rossellini is a common Italian surname. Notable people with the surname include:

- Roberto Rossellini, Italian film director
  - Renzo Rossellini, producer, son of Roberto
  - Isabella Rossellini, actress, daughter of Roberto
    - Elettra Rossellini Wiedemann, American fashion model, daughter of Isabella
  - Isotta Ingrid Rossellini, writer, daughter of Roberto
- Renzo Rossellini, Italian composer, brother of Roberto

== See also ==
- Rosellini
- Bernardo Rossellino
