= Mattia =

Mattia is an Italian masculine given name and surname, a version of Matteo, which means "gift of God". Notable people with the name include:

== Given name ==
- Mattia Altobelli (footballer, born 1983), Italian footballer
- Mattia Altobelli (footballer, born 1995), Italian footballer
- Mattia Barbieri (born 2002), known professionally as Rondodasosa, Italian rapper and singer
- Mattia Battistini (1856–1928), Italian operatic baritone
- Mattia Benedetti, Italian painter
- Mattia Binotto (born 1969), Italian engineer
- Mattia Biso (born 1977), Italian midfielder for Frosinone Calcio
- Mattia Bodano (born 1990), Italian midfielder
- Mattia Bortoloni (1696–1750), Italian painter of the Rococo period
- Mattia Bottolo (born 2000), Italian volleyball player
- Mattia Cadorin (mid-17th century), Italian engraver and publisher who flourished at Padua c. 1648
- Mattia Carpanese (born 1985), Italian speedway rider
- Mattia Cassani (born 1983), Italian footballer
- Mattia Cherubini (born 1988), Italian professional football player
- Mattia Coletti (born 1984), Italian ski mountaineer
- Mattia Colnaghi (born 2008), Italian racing driver
- Mattia Dal Bello (born 1984), Italian professional football player
- Mattia de Rossi (1637–1695), Italian architect of the Baroque period, active mainly in Rome and surrounding towns
- Mattia De Sciglio (born 1992), Italian footballer
- Mattia Destro (born 1991), Italian footballer
- Mattia Fantinati (born 1975), Italian Politician
- Mattia Ferrato (born 1989), Italian footballer who plays for Lega Pro Seconda Divisione team A.C. Carpenedolo
- Mattia Gallon (born 1992), Italian professional football player
- Mattia Gavazzi (born 1983), Italian road cyclist
- Mattia Graffiedi (born 1980), Italian striker
- Mattia Lanzano (born 1990), Italian professional footballer
- Mattia Marchesetti (born 1983), Italian football (soccer) midfielder
- Mattia Marchi (born 1989), Italian footballer
- Mattia Masi (born 1984), Sammarinese footballer
- Mattia Moreni (1920–1999), Italian artist
- Mattia Mustacchio (born 1989), Italian footballer
- Mattia Notari (born 1979), Italian football player who plays as a centre back
- Mattia Pasini (born 1985), Italian Grand Prix motorcycle road racer
- Mattia Passarini (born 1980), Italian football goalkeeper
- Mattia Perin (born 1992), Italian professional football player
- Mattia Pin (born 1988), Italian professional football player
- Mattia Preti (1613–1699), Italian Baroque artist who worked in Italy and Malta
- Mattia Raffa (born 1931), later known as Matilda Cuomo and known for being the wife of New York Governor Mario Cuomo and the mother of both New York Governor Andrew Cuomo and American television journalist Chris Cuomo
- Mattia Righetti (born 1980), Italian rower
- Mattia Rinaldini (born 1980), Italian professional football player
- Mattia Sbragia (born 1952), Italian character actor
- Mattia Serafini (born 1983), Italian footballer
- Mattia Valoti (born 1993), Italian midfielder, currently on the books of Milan

== Surname ==
- Alphonse Mattia (born 1947), Italian-American furniture designer, woodworker, sculptor and professor
- Ettore G. Mattia (1910–1982), Italian journalist and actor
- Francisco Mattia (born 1988), Argentine footballer
- Isaac Mattia (born 1988), South Sudanese footballer
- Simone Mattia (born 1996), Italian footballer
