= Cherubini =

Cherubini is an Italian surname. Cherubini may refer to:

== People ==
- Bixio Cherubini (1899–1987), Italian lyricist, playwright and poet
- Caterina Cherubini (died 1811), Italian miniature painter
- Corkin Cherubini (born 1944), American educator, musician, and writer
- Francesco Cherubini (1585–1656), Catholic cardinal who served as Bishop of Senigallia
- Gianluca Cherubini (1974–2026), Italian professional football player
- Laerzio Cherubini (1556–1626), Italian criminal lawyer and jurisconsult in Rome
- Lorenzo Cherubini (born 1966), birthname of the Italian singer Jovanotti
- Luigi Cherubini (1760–1842), Italian Classical and pre-Romantic composer, close friend of Beethoven
- Mattia Cherubini (born 1988), former Italian footballer
- Nicole Cherubini (born 1970), American visual artist and sculptor
- Sallustio Cherubini (died 1659), Roman Catholic prelate who served as Bishop of Città Ducale

== Other uses ==
- Cherubini Quartet, German string quartet from Düsseldorf, founded in 1978
- Conservatorio Luigi Cherubini, Italian academic music school located in Florence

== See also ==
- Cherub (disambiguation)
- List of operas by Luigi Cherubini
