= Cadorin =

Cadorin is a surname. Notable people with the surname include:

- Chrissy Cadorin (born 1980), Canadian curler
- Ettore Cadorin (1876–1952), American sculptor and teacher
- Ludovico Cadorin (1824–1892), Italian architect
- Mattia Cadorin (mid-17th century), Italian engraver and publisher
- Serge Cadorin (1961–2007), Belgian footballer
