= Altobelli =

Altobelli is an Italian surname. Notable people with the surname include:

- Alessandro Altobelli (born 1955), Italian footballer
- Argentina Altobelli (1866–1942), Italian trade unionist
- Daniele Altobelli (born 1993), Italian football player
- Joe Altobelli (1932–2021), American baseball player, manager and coach
- John Altobelli (1963–2020), American baseball coach
- Julian Altobelli (born 2002), Canadian soccer player
- Leonel Altobelli (born 1986), Argentine footballer
- Mattia Altobelli (disambiguation), multiple people
- Nicholas Altobelli (born 1985), American singer and songwriter
- Philip Altobelli (born 1988), American musician
