= Mattei =

Mattei may refer to:

- Mattei (surname)
- Mattei family, noble Roman family
- Mattei sarcophagus I, known as Mattei I

== See also ==
- Matteis, surname
- Matthei
