= Matteo =

- Pronunciation: Italian: [matˈtɛːo]
- Gender: Male
- Name day: September 21

Origin
- Origin: Italian
- Meaning: Italian form of the Hebrew name "Matthew" meaning "gift of God"
- Region of origin: Italy

Other names
- Related names: Mattia

Matteo is the Italian form of the given name Matthew. Another form is Mattia. The Hebrew meaning of Matteo is "gift of god". Matteo can also be used as a patronymic surname, often in the forms of de Matteo, De Matteo or DeMatteo, meaning "[descendant] of Matteo".

== Given name Matteo ==
- Matteo Bandello, Italian novelist
- Matteo Berrettini (born 1996), Italian tennis player
- Matteo Bisiani, Italian archer
- Matteo Maria Boiardo, Italian Renaissance poet
- Matteo Bruni (born 1976), Italian-British director of the Holy See Press Office
- Matteo Cocchi, Italian footballer
- Matteo Fedele (born 1992), Swiss footballer
- Matteo Ferrari, Italian football player who currently plays for Montreal Impact
- Matteo Gigante (born 2002), Italian tennis player
- Matteo Goffriller, renowned 18th-century Italian cello maker
- Matteo Graziano (born 2001), Argentine rugby player
- Matteo Guendouzi, French football player
- Matteo Guidicelli (born 1990), Filipino actor, model, and singer
- Mateo Kovačić, professional footballer
- Matteo Lane (born 1986), American comedian
- Matteo Lavelli (born 2006), Italian footballer
- Matteo Mancuso (born 1996), Italian jazz and rock guitarist and composer
- Matteo Mantero (born 1974), Italian politician
- Matteo Messina Denaro, Italian criminal. Was on the top 10 most wanted list of the world
- Matteo Neri (born 1999), Italian fencer
- Matteo Palotta, 18th-century Italian composer
- Matteo Paz (born 2006 or 2007), American astronomer
- Matteo Perez d'Aleccio, Italian painter of devotional, historical and maritime subjects
- Matteo Renzi, Italian Prime Minister
- Matteo Ricci, Italian Catholic missionary in China
- Matteo Salvini, Italian politician
- Matteo Sereni, Italian football goalkeeper
- Matteo Stefanini, Italian rower
- Matteo Tosatto, Italian cyclist who rides for Quick Step-Innergetic in the UCI ProTour
- Matteo Vittucci, Italian-American dancer, known professionally as Matteo

== Surname Matteo, DeMatteo or De Matteo ==
- Dominic Matteo (born 1974), Scottish footballer
- Drea de Matteo (born 1972), American actress
- Frank Matteo (1896–1983), American football player
- Felice DeMatteo (1866–1929), Italian-American composer and bandmaster
- Ivano De Matteo (born 1966), Italian director, screenwriter and actor
- Laura Di Matteo (born 1991), Italian professional wrestler
- Salvatore T. DeMatteo (1911–2003), New York politician and judge

== See also ==
- Mattei (disambiguation)
- Matthew (name)
- Don Matteo, Italian TV serial
