= Mattea =

Mattea is a surname. Notable people with the surname include:

- Angelo Mattea (1892–1960), Italian footballer and manager
- Kathy Mattea (born 1959), American country singer-songwriter

== Given name ==
- Mattea Conforti (born 2006), American actress
- Mattea Roach (born 1998), Canadian tutor and Jeopardy! champion

== See also ==
- Matteo
