= Cheru =

Cheru or Choru may refer to:

== Burma ==
- Cheru, Kyauktaga, a former town in Kyauktaga Township, Bago Region, Burma (Myanmar)

== Iran ==
(Persian: چرو)

- Cheru, Khuzestan
- Choru, Kohgiluyeh and Boyer-Ahmad
- Cheru, Razavi Khorasan
