= Mattei sarcophagus I =

3rd century Roman sarcophagus

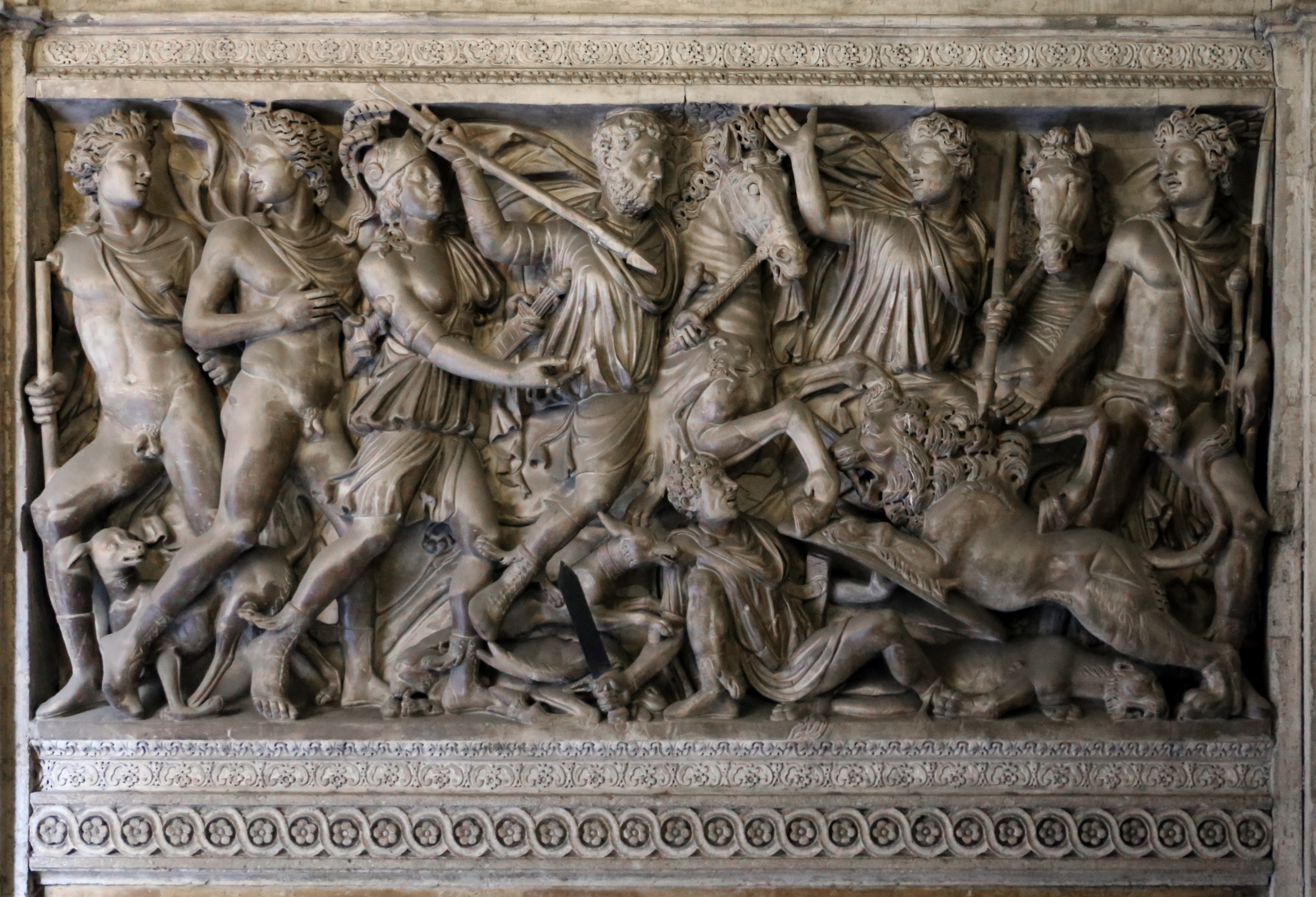
Mattei sarcophagus I

The sarcophagus with hunting scenes, known as Mattei I, is an ancient Roman sarcophagus of the 3rd century, displayed at the palazzo Mattei in Rome. It is 1.31m high.

== Description ==
From the age of Caracalla onwards, carved sarcophagus production shows a kind of reaction to the "pittoricism" of examples from the preceding era (late 2nd-early 3rd century), such as the Portonaccio sarcophagus), with a return to richer plasticity, as is also documented in Roman portraiture between 215 and 250. Hugely influenced by their use in the Eastern Empire and the Middle East, hunting scenes in Roman art had started to become popular in Hadrianic art and the popularity of their use on sarcophagi spread thanks to Caracalla's predilection for Alexander the Great and his hunts (the Mattei example is one of the earliest with such scenes).

In the Roman world it acquired a new meaning as a signifier of military values, as shown by the Virtus-Roma figure in Amazonian dress standing behind the mounted hunter in this scene. This mounted hunter has a physiognomic portrait (datable to between 220 and 230, by comparison with the style of the portrait of Caracalla) and hurls a spear towards a lion at the right. Beneath this lions paws is a fallen hunter with sword and shield, and under this lion is another, dead lion. To the left are two standing nude divinities, possibly the Dioscuri. To the right, above the live lion, is a beardless mounted hunter in a tunic and another nude standing figure.

The composition is very crowded, with overlapping figures in a scheme unknown in 2nd century classicism. The use of drilling and the abundant chiaroscuro of high relief are typical of the expressionism of the turn of the 2nd/3rd centuries, though the solid plasticity and consistency of the figures indicate a continuing classicism. This compositional pattern is repeated with little variation on later hunting sarcophagi.

== See also ==
- Great Ludovisi sarcophagus

== Bibliography ==
- Ranuccio Bianchi Bandinelli and Mario Torelli, L'arte dell'antichità classica, Etruria-Roma, Utet, Turin 1976.
