= Profile in Courage Award =

Award from the John F. Kennedy Library Foundation

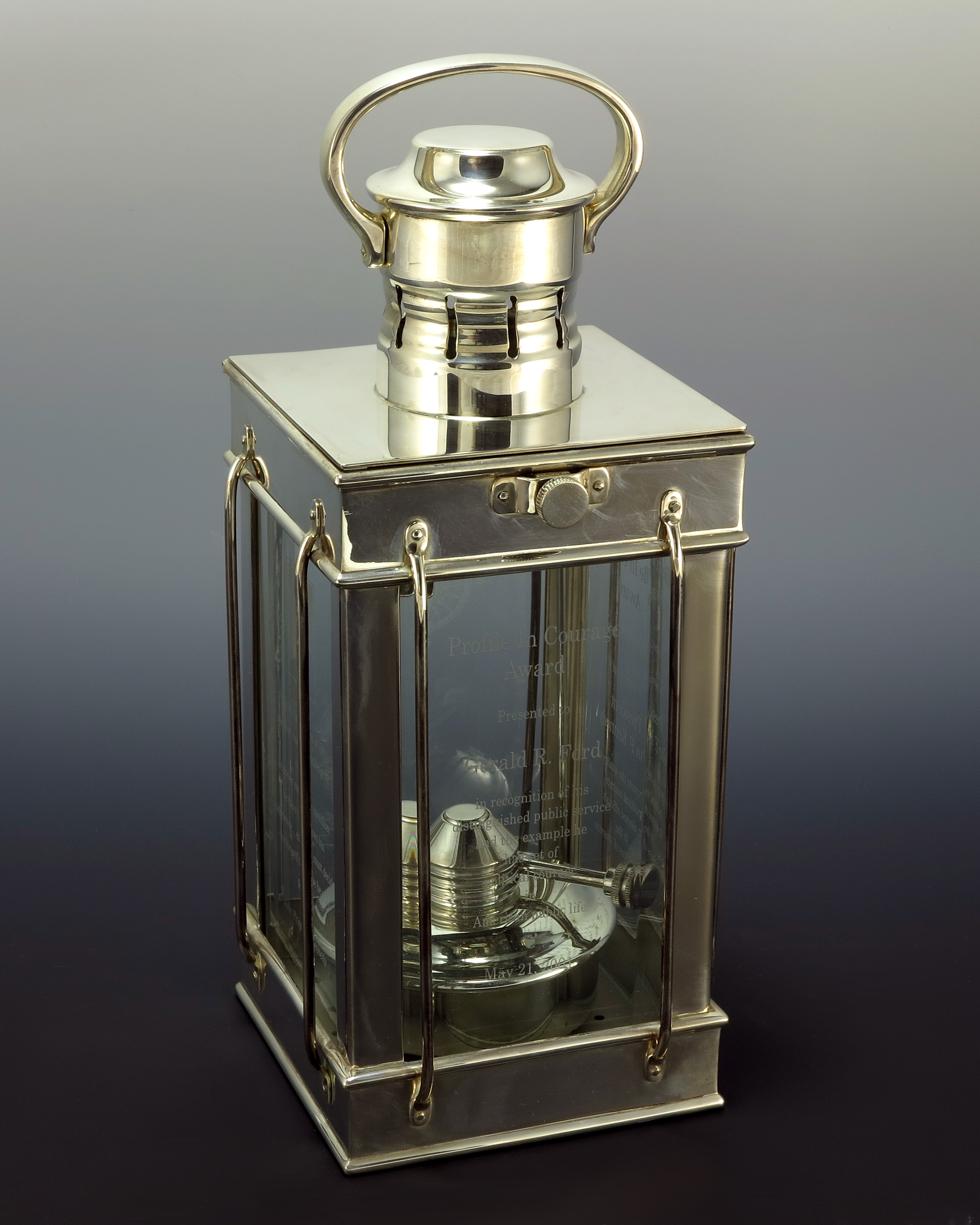
The Profile in Courage Award presented to Gerald Ford by Ted Kennedy in 2001

The Profile in Courage Award is a private award created by the Kennedy family to recognize displays of courage similar to those John F. Kennedy originally described in his book of the same name. It is given to individuals (often elected officials) who, by acting in accord with their conscience, risked their careers or lives by pursuing a larger vision of the national, state, or local interest in opposition to popular opinion or pressure from constituents or other local interests.

== Background ==
The winners of the award are selected by a committee named by the John F. Kennedy Library Foundation, which includes members of the Kennedy family and other prominent Americans. It is generally awarded each year around the time of JFK's birthday (May 29) at a ceremony at the Kennedy Library in Boston. The award is generally presented by JFK's daughter, Caroline. Also before their deaths, other presenters had included John Kennedy's brother, Ted, his son John Jr., and his widow Jacqueline.

Two recipients, John Lewis (in 2001) and William Winter (in 2008), were designated as honorees for Lifetime Achievement.

== Design ==
The winner is presented with a sterling silver lantern made by Tiffany's which was designed by Edwin Schlossberg. The lantern is patterned after the lanterns on the USS Constitution which was launched in 1797. It is the last sail-powered ship to remain part of the US Navy, and is permanently moored nearby.

== Recipients ==
| Year | Recipient | Occupation | Achievements | Other finalists |
|---|---|---|---|---|
| 1990 | Carl Elliott Sr. | Former U.S. representative (Alabama) | For working to enact civil rights laws and the National Defense Education Act of 1958 (Hill–Elliott Act), which "made him the target of vicious criticism from reactionaries of both parties" and caused his ouster from Congress in 1964. | Henry Bellmon, Unita Blackwell, LeRoy Collins, Morris K. Udall |
| 1991 | Charles L. Weltner | Former U.S. representative (Georgia) | For his decision to drop out of his race for reelection to a third term, rather than seek reelection and be bound by a party loyalty oath to support the candidacy of segregationist Lester Maddox. | Frank P. Graham, George M. Michaels, Nicholas C. Wasicsko |
| 1992 | Lowell Weicker | U.S. Representative, U.S. Senator, and the 85th Governor of Connecticut. | For proposing, as governor of Connecticut, a budget that included the introduction of an unpopular state personal income tax and major spending cuts in order to address Connecticut's financial crisis. | |
| 1993 | James Florio | Governor of New Jersey (1990–1994); U.S. representative (1975–1990) | | |
| 1994 | Henry B. González | U.S. representative (Texas) (1961-1999) | | |
| 1995 | Mike Synar | U.S. representative (Oklahoma) | | |
| 1996 | Corkin Cherubini | School superintendent | Efforts to rectify civil rights abuses in his small southern school district | |
| 1997 | Judge Charles Price | A judge for Circuit 15 in Montgomery County, Alabama. He served as a judge for the court from 1983 until his retirement from the bench on January 16, 2015. | | |
| 1998 | Nickolas C. Murnion | A judge on the 16th Judicial District Court in Montana. | | |
| 1998 | "Peacemakers of Northern Ireland" | Negotiators and signatories of the Good Friday Agreement. | Awarded to the negotiators and signatories of the Good Friday Agreement, "in recognition of the extraordinary political courage they demonstrated." Presented to John Hume, Gerry Adams, John Alderdice, Malachi Curran, David Ervine, Gary McMichael, Monica McWilliams, David Trimble, and George J. Mitchell. | |
| 1999 | Russ Feingold | U.S. Senator (Wisconsin) (1993–2011); Wisconsin State Senator (27th District) (1983-1993). | For co-sponsoring the Bipartisan Campaign Reform Act | |
| 1999 | John McCain | U.S. Senator (Arizona) (1987-2018); U.S. Representative (1983-1987); Republican nominee in the 2008 U.S. presidential election. | For co-sponsoring the Bipartisan Campaign Reform Act | |
| 2000 | Hilda Solis | Member of the Los Angeles County Board of Supervisors for the 1st district; United States Secretary of Labor (2009–2013) during the Obama administration; U.S. Representative (2001–2009) | | |
| 2001 | John Lewis (Lifetime Achievement Award) | An American civil rights movement leader and politician, Lewis was the U.S. representative for Georgia's 5th congressional district from 1987 until his death in 2020. He was the dean of the Georgia congressional delegation, and his district included three quarters of Atlanta. | | |
| 2001 | Gerald Ford | 38th president of the United States | For his controversial pardon of Richard Nixon, which arguably cost him the 1976 election. | |
| 2002 | Kofi Annan | A Ghanaian diplomat who served as the seventh Secretary-General of the United Nations from January 1997 to December 2006. Annan and the UN were the co-recipients of the 2001 Nobel Peace Prize. He is the founder and chairman of the Kofi Annan Foundation, as well as chairman of The Elders, an international organization founded by Nelson Mandela. | | |
| 2002 | Dean Koldenhoven | Former mayor of Palos Heights, Illinois | Political courage in speaking out against religious discrimination and calling for tolerance within his community. | |
| 2002 | "Public Servants of September 11" | Representatives of NYPD, the FDNY, and the military | Risked their lives on September 11, 2001 attacks | |
| 2003 | Dan Ponder Jr. | He was a member of the Georgia House of Representatives from 1997 to 2000. He is a member of the Republican party. He was elected mayor of Donalsonville, Georgia in 2013. | Took a contentious stand in favor of hate-crimes legislation in Georgia, which may have cost him his seat in the state House. | |
| 2003 | David Beasley | Executive Director of the U.N. World Food Programme. Beasley served one term as the 113th Governor of South Carolina from 1995 until 1999, as a member of the Republican Party. | For his efforts to remove the Confederate battle flag from atop the state capitol. | |
| 2003 | Roy Barnes | Governor of Georgia (1999–2003). | For his efforts to minimize the Confederate battle emblem on Georgia's state flag. | |
| 2004 | Sima Samar | | A well known woman's and human rights advocate, activist and a social worker within national and international forums, who served as Minister of Women's Affairs of Afghanistan from December 2001 to 2003. | |
| 2004 | Cindy Watson | Former North Carolina State Representative | | |
| 2004 | Paul Muegge | State Senator | | |
| 2005 | Joe Darby | The whistleblower in the Abu Ghraib torture and prisoner abuse scandal. | | |
| 2005 | Shirley Franklin | Mayor of Atlanta (2002–2010) | | |
| 2005 | Bill Ratliff | Texas State Senator (1988–2004) | | |
| 2005 | Viktor Yushchenko | Third President of Ukraine (2005–2010) | | |
| 2006 | Alberto J. Mora | A former General Counsel of the Navy | Led an effort within the Defense Department to oppose the legal theories of John Yoo and to try to end coercive interrogation tactics at Guantanamo Bay, which he argued are unlawful. | |
| 2006 | John Murtha | U.S. representative (Pennsylvania) | | |
| 2007 | Bill White | Mayor of Houston (2004–2010) | "Mayor White's quick actions in welcoming thousands of families displaced by hurricanes Katrina and Rita most certainly helped to save lives." | |
| 2007 | Doris Voitier | Superintendent of Schools, St. Bernard Parish, Louisiana | "Despite insurmountable odds, Doris Voitier rebuilt the schools of St. Bernard Parish [after Hurricane Katrina], making sure the children of her community had a place to learn and grow when they returned home." | |
| 2008 | Jennifer Brunner | Ohio Secretary of State | | |
| 2008 | Debra Bowen | Secretary of State of California (2007–2015); member of the California State Legislature (1992-2006) | | |
| 2008 | William Winter (Lifetime Achievement Award) | Governor of Mississippi (1980–1984) | | |
| 2009 | Edward M. Kennedy | U.S. Senator (Massachusetts) | | |
| 2009 | Brooksley Born | Chairperson of the Commodity Futures Trading Commission (1996–1999) | | |
| 2009 | Sheila Bair | 19th Chair of the U.S. Federal Deposit Insurance Corporation (FDIC), during which time she assumed a prominent role in the government's response to the 2008 financial crisis. She was appointed to the post for a five-year term on June 26, 2006, by George W. Bush. | | |
| 2009 | Leymah Gbowee and the Women of Liberia Mass Action for Peace | Helped bring an end to the Second Liberian Civil War in 2003. | | |
| 2010 | Karen Bass | Bass represented the 47th district in the California State Assembly 2004–2010, and was Speaker of the California State Assembly 2008–2010 (second woman, third African American speaker). | | |
| 2010 | Dave Cogdill | Republican politician who served as a State Senator from California's 14th State Senate district from December 2006 to December 2010. | | |
| 2010 | Darrell Steinberg | A member of the California State Senate representing the 6th District. He had also previously served as a member of the California State Assembly (1998–2004) and as a member of the Sacramento City Council (1992–1998). He is a member of the Democratic Party. | | |
| 2010 | Michael Villines | Former California State Assemblyman, who served from 2004 to 2010 representing the 29th district. | | |
| 2011 | Elizabeth Redenbaugh | School Board Member, New Hanover County, North Carolina | For her actions, as a member of North Carolina's New Hanover County School Board "against what she perceived as racial segregation in school redistricting plans." | |
| 2011 | Wael Ghonim and the People of Egypt | | "presented to Wael Ghonim in honor of all Egyptians who stood up, at great personal risk, for the principles of democracy and self-governance" in the Egyptian revolution of 2011. | |
| 2012 | Marsha Ternus, David L. Baker, and Michael Streit | Justices of the Iowa Supreme Court | "[I]n recognition of the political courage and judicial independence each demonstrated in setting aside popular opinion to uphold the basic freedoms and security guaranteed to all citizens under the Iowa constitution." The justices joined the unanimous Iowa Supreme Court ruling, Varnum v. Brien, that legally recognized same-sex marriage in Iowa; "[a]lthough the Court's decision was unanimous, it provoked a political backlash. In November 2010, voters removed Ternus, Baker and Streit from office following an unprecedented campaign financed in part by national interest groups opposed to same-sex marriage." | |
| 2012 | Robert Stephen Ford | Diplomat; United States Ambassador to Algeria (2006-2008); United States Ambassador to Syria (2010-2014) | For "bold and courageous diplomacy" that "provided crucial support to Syrians struggling under the brutal regime of Syrian president Bashar al-Assad." | |
| 2013 | Gabby Giffords | Former U.S. Representative for Arizona's 8th congressional district (2007–2012) | "[I]n recognition of the political, personal, and physical courage she has demonstrated in her fearless public advocacy for policy reforms aimed at reducing gun violence." Giffords survived an assassination attempt that left her with a severe brain injury. | |
| 2014 | George H. W. Bush | 41st President of the United States | "[I]n recognition of the political courage he demonstrated when he agreed to a 1990 budget compromise that reversed his 1988 campaign pledge not to raise taxes and put his re-election prospects at risk." | |
| 2014 | Paul W. Bridges | Mayor of Uvalda, Georgia | "[F]or risking his mayoral career with his decision to publicly oppose a controversial immigration law in Georgia" (Georgia House Bill 87). Bridges joined a federal lawsuit filed by the ACLU to stop the implementation of the law. | |
| 2015 | Bob Inglis | Former U.S. Representative for South Carolina's 4th congressional district (1993–1999; 2005–2011) | "[F]or the courage he demonstrated when reversing his position on climate change after extensive briefings with scientists, and discussions with his children, about the impact of atmospheric warming on our future. Knowing the potential consequences to his political career, Inglis nevertheless called on the United States to meaningfully address the issue." | |
| 2016 | Dannel Malloy | Governor of Connecticut (2011–2019) | For "courageously defend[ing] the U.S. resettlement of Syrian refugees and personally welcom[ing] a family of Syrian refugees to New Haven after they had been turned away by another state." | |
| 2017 | Barack Obama | 44th President of the United States | "[F]or his enduring commitment to democratic ideals and elevating the standard of political courage in a new century." | |
| 2018 | Mitch Landrieu | Mayor of New Orleans | "[F]or his leadership in removing four Confederate monuments in New Orleans while offering candid, clear and compassionate reflections on the moment and its place in history." | |
| 2019 | Nancy Pelosi | Speaker of the U.S. House of Representatives | "[F]or putting the national interest above her party's interest to expand access to health care for all Americans and then, against a wave of political attacks, leading the effort to retake the majority and elect the most diverse Congress in our nation's history." | |
| 2021 | Mitt Romney | U.S. Senator (Utah); Former Governor of Massachusetts (2003–2007); Republican nominee in the 2012 U.S. presidential election. | "For his vote to impeach President Donald J. Trump in 2020, and his consistent and courageous defense of democracy. As the first Senator to have ever voted to convict a President of his own party, Senator Romney's courageous stand was historic." | |
| 2022 | Volodymyr Zelenskyy | President of Ukraine | "Each for their courage to protect and defend democracy in the United States and abroad." | |
| 2022 | Liz Cheney | U.S. Representative at large, Wyoming; Republican | "Each for their courage to protect and defend democracy in the United States and abroad." | |
| 2022 | Jocelyn Benson | Secretary of State for Michigan; Democratic Party of Michigan | "Each for their courage to protect and defend democracy in the United States and abroad." | |
| 2022 | Russell "Rusty" Bowers | 54th Speaker of the Arizona House of Representatives; Republican Party of Arizona | "Each for their courage to protect and defend democracy in the United States and abroad." | |
| 2022 | Wandrea' ArShaye Moss | Elections Department employee, Fulton County, Georgia | "Each for their courage to protect and defend democracy in the United States and abroad." | |
2023
| 2023 | Katrina Shealy, Margie Bright Matthews, Mia McLeod, Sandy Senn, and Penry Gustafson | South Carolina State Senators | "Five women Senators from South Carolina [...] who formed a bipartisan coalition to filibuster a near-total abortion ban in their state." | |
| 2023 | Yoon Suk Yeol (Special International Award) | 13th President of South Korea | "[F]or working to improve relations between their countries despite domestic opposition stemming from historical issues." The awards were accepted by Cho Hyun-dong (South Korea) and Takeo Mori and Kotaro Suzuki (Japan). | |
| 2023 | Fumio Kishida (Special International Award) | 64th Prime Minister of Japan | "[F]or working to improve relations between their countries despite domestic opposition stemming from historical issues." The awards were accepted by Cho Hyun-dong (South Korea) and Takeo Mori and Kotaro Suzuki (Japan). | |
| 2024 | Michael G. Adams | Secretary of State of Kentucky, Republican | "[F]or expanding voting rights and standing up for free and fair elections despite party opposition and death threats from election deniers." | |
| 2025 | Mike Pence | 48th vice president of the United States | "[F]or putting his life and career on the line to ensure the constitutional transfer of presidential power on Jan. 6, 2021." | |
| 2026 | Jerome Powell | 16th chair of the Federal Reserve | "[F]or protecting the independence of the Federal Reserve, which is critical to the stability of the global economy." | |
| 2026 | The People of the Twin Cities, Minnesota | | "[F]or risking their lives to protect their neighbors and immigrant community members from an unprecedented federal law enforcement operation." | |
