= Mattia Altobelli =

Mattia Altobelli may refer to:

- Mattia Altobelli (footballer, born 1983)
- Mattia Altobelli (footballer, born 1995)
