= Cherub (disambiguation) =

A cherub is a supernatural being in the Bible.

Cherub or Cherubs may also refer to:

- Cherub or putto, a figure in a work of art depicted as a chubby male child, usually naked and very often winged
- Charleroi Cherubs, a basketball team in Pennsylvania, USA
- HMS Cherub (1806), a British navy ship
- Cherub (dinghy), a class of dinghy
- CHERUB, a series of spy novels by Robert Muchamore
- Bristol Cherub, an aircraft engine
- Cherubim (Wrinkle in Time), character from Wrinkle in Time
- "C.H.E.R.U.B.", the fourth episode of Helluva Boss
- Cherubs!, a fantasy graphic novel by Bryan Talbot

== Music ==
- Cherub (musical duo), American electro-indie duo from Nashville, Tennessee
- Cherubs (UK band), active from 2003–2007
- Cherubs (American band), noise rock band formed in 1991
- "Cherub" (song), a 2020 song by Ball Park Music

== See also ==
- Cheru (disambiguation)
