= Ludovico Cadorin =

Italian architect, active in Northern Italy, mainly around Venice and the Veneto

Ludovico or Lodovico Cadorin (1824 – 1892) was an Italian architect, active in Northern Italy, mainly around Venice and the Veneto.

== Biography ==
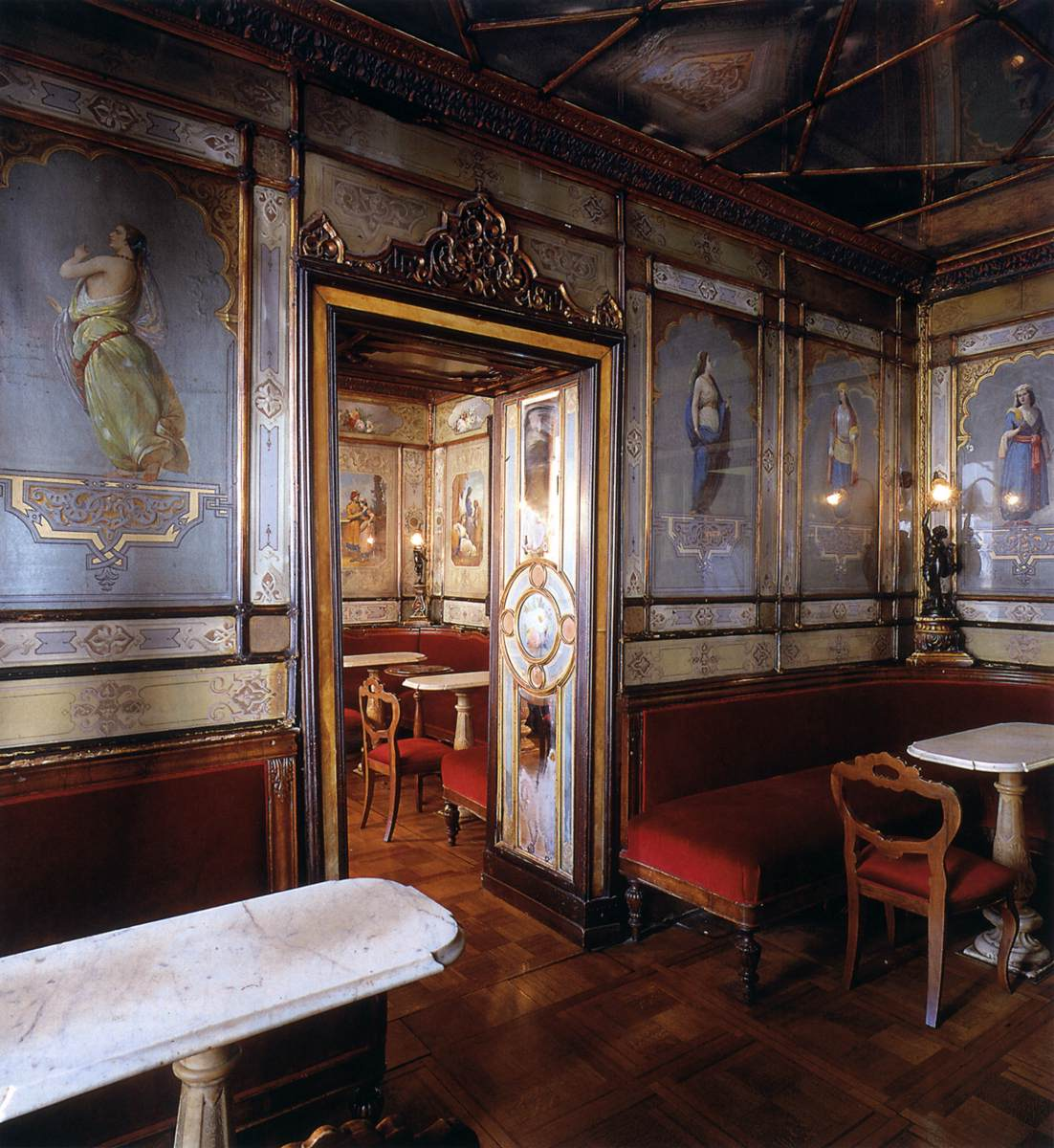
Decorations of rooms of Caffe Florian

He studied at the Accademia di Belle Arti of Venice and later became docent of the institution.

Cadorin was best known for his 1858 restructuring and interior decorations of four rooms in the Caffe Florian in Piazza San Marco; he remade the Sala Oriental with chinoiserie paintings, but also designed the eclectic decorations the Sala delle Stagioni, la Sala degli Uomini Illustri, and the Sala del Senato.

In the 1850s, in a bid to create a large hotel complex for bourgeois tourists, the Podesta of Venice Giovanni Correr commissioned a massive project for the Riva degli Schiavoni, along the Basin of San Marco, with an eclectic series of architectural quotations serving as a 600 meter facade for a grand hotel with bathing facilities, bazaars, a hippodrome, and drinking and eating establishments. The project was promoted in a series of contemporary vedute by Luigi Querena and publicly displayed. The project was never adopted. Cadorin was able to play a role in the construction of a large recreational hotel-spa complex on the Venetian Lido, commissioned by the businessman, Giovanni Busetto called "il Fisola". Both the projects at the Basin of San Marco and the Lido had to overcome objections by the Austrian military authorities.

Nicolò Bottacin commissioned from Cadorin a design for a villino in Trieste.

In 1854, the patron Ambrogio Lugo commissioned a new urban palace on via Jacopo da Ponte in the town of Bassano de Grappa. The palace, now called Palazzo Lugo Vinanti. was completed in 1904 and is an eclectic facade, described as a re-imagining of a Lombard-Byzantine style, elegantly decorated with terracotta trimmings.

Cadorin also provided the designs (1861) for the refurbishment of the Chapel of the Santissimio Sacramento in the Sanctuary della Beata Vergine della Navicella in Chioggia, completed by the stucco artist and mason Giovali Battista Negri, and completed 1866.
