= Corkin Cherubini =

American educator, musician, and writer

Corkin Cherubini (born April 25, 1944) is an American educator, musician, and writer. He is best known for efforts to rectify civil rights abuses in the small southern school district where he was school superintendent. His efforts gained national recognition, spotlighting a problem in school districts, nationwide. He received the John F. Kennedy Profile in Courage Award in 1996.

== Early life ==
Corkin Cherubini's early life was spent in Portland, Oregon, and later in Worcester, MA. Most of junior high and high school was in southern New Jersey. He graduated from Vineland High School in 1962.

Cherubini went to Troy University in the fall of 1962 and graduated with concentrations in English Literature, history, and aesthetics in the arts in 1967. He completed work for a master's degree in Audiovisual Education at the University of Virginia and his doctorate in Educational Leadership from Auburn University. In 1986, he received a National Endowment for the Humanities grant to study William Shakespeare's Hamlet at Harvard University.

== Career ==
In 1992, Cherubini was elected school superintendent of the Calhoun County, Georgia, School District where he had taught for twenty-two years.

As school superintendent, Cherubini was in a position to investigate the "racial tracking" of students from kindergarten through high school. He discovered that no reliable criteria were used for kindergarten placement, and that the composition of the two lower learning levels in kindergarten remained virtually unchanged throughout elementary and junior high school. This practice automatically ensured that children in the lower tracks, primarily children of color, were destined for non-academic tracks in high school.

Cherubini's initial plan was to balance the composition of classes, beginning in kindergarten. Each year, an additional grade level would feature a more balanced class composition. However, public outcry necessitated more stringent measures, and Cherubini turned to the Department of Education and the Office of Civil Rights for help.

In late 1994, the Office of Civil Rights and Miami Equity Associates, a branch of the Southeastern Desegregation Center financed by the federal government, concluded that neither test scores, grades, nor teacher evaluation were used for student placement—a violation of the 1964 Civil Rights Act. As a result, the four tier tracking model in Cherubini's system was abandoned. Funding from the United States Department of Education enabled the system to educate teachers so they might effectively teach a classroom of children with many levels of learning ability. Cherubini's fight reflected a national debate over tracking and the difficulties of changing that culture. Cherubini's determination to see that all students in his school system had equal educational opportunity spotlighted a pervasive problem, not just in the South, but throughout America. Cherubini's efforts spawned nationwide change.

== Awards ==
In 1996, Cherubini received the John F. Kennedy Profile in Courage Award. He was the seventh awardee and the first local politician to receive the award. He was commended for his courage and leadership in working for quality education for children.

Asked if he would pursue the same course of action or a safer course, Cherubini replied, "There is not one action I would change. As the chief advocate for children in my county, I carefully made each decision for the well-being and betterment of these children, and I would have to take a similar course though the consequences be many times as formidable."

Cherubini retired in 1997. Since then, he has written and published two books, Gang Stalking: The Threat to Humanity (2014, ISBN 9781500422936) and Suzanne: Targeted for Death (2015). He has also written, performed, and produced two political protest musical CD's, Indigo After Rain (2008) and in 2009, Back to Boheme.
