= Matteo Palotta =

Italian composer

Matteo Palotta (c. 1688 – 28 March 1758) was an Italian priest and composer of church music. He became a court composer in Vienna.

== Life ==
Palotta, known as Il Palermitano, from his birthplace Palermo, studied at the Conservatorio di Sant'Onofrio a Porta Capuana in Naples, and by 1720 was known as a composer of sacred choral music. He was ordained, and became canon of Palermo in 1730.

In Vienna, recommended by Johann Joseph Fux, Kapellmeister of the Hofmusikkapelle of Charles VI, he was appointed in 1733 as one of the court composers. He was released in 1741 after the death of Charles VI, and reinstated in 1749. He died in Vienna on 28 March 1758. Georg Christoph Wagenseil was a pupil.

== Works ==
Palotta produced Gregoriani cantus enucleata praxis et cognitio: this is a treatise on Guido d'Arezzo's Solmisation and an instruction book in church mode.

The libraries of the Vienna Court chapel and the Gesellschaft der Musikfreunde have since possessed a number of his masses in 4 to 8 parts, motets, and other works. Carl Ferdinand Pohl wrote that they are "all written in a pure and elevated church style, the parts moving easily and naturally in spite of their elaborate counterpoint. In many points they recall Antonio Caldara. One special feature in Palotta's music is the free development of the chief subject, and the skilful way in which he combines it with the counter-subjects."
