= Matteis =

Matteis or De Matteis the surname of the following notable people:

- Davide Zugaro De Matteis, Italian footballer
- Erica De Matteis, Italian model and beauty pageant titleholder
- Paolo de Matteis, Italian painter (1662–1728)
- Maria De Matteis (1898-1988), costume designer
- Martin Dematteis (born 1986), Italian male mountain runner and sky runner
- Nicola Matteis, violinist and composer (fl. c. 1670 – c. 1698)
- Ulisse De Matteis (1827-1910) was a Florentine artist who worked primarily in stained glass
