= Portonaccio sarcophagus =

Sarcophagus from 2nd century (CE) Rome

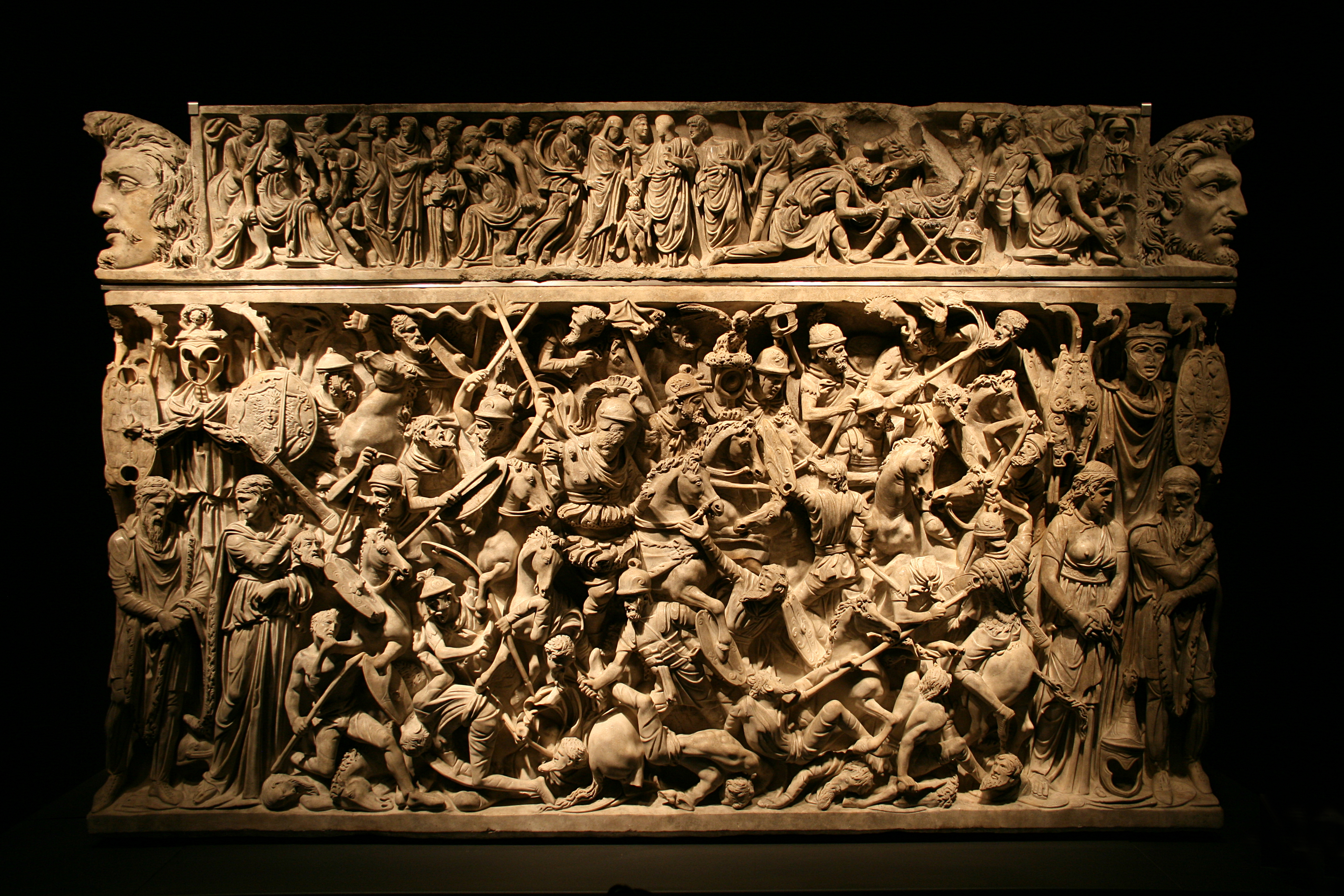
- Material: Marble
- Height: 114 cm
- Width: 239 cm
- Depth: 116 cm
- Created: late 2nd century AD
- Present location: National Roman Museum of Palazzo Massimo, Rome
- Registration: inv. 112.327

The Portonaccio sarcophagus is a 2nd-century ancient Roman sarcophagus found in the Portonaccio section of Rome and now held at the Museo Nazionale Romano (Palazzo Massimo). Dating to around 180 AD, the sarcophagus was likely used to bury a Roman general killed in the 172–175 AD German-Sarmatic campaign of Marcus Aurelius during the Marcomannic Wars. It is an example of private sculpture of art in the age of Commodus, with visible influences from the design of the Column of Marcus Aurelius.

== History ==
The sarcophagus is one of a group of about twenty-five late Roman battle sarcophagi, with one exception all apparently dating to 170–210, made in Rome or in some cases Athens. These derive from Hellenistic monuments from Pergamon in Asia Minor showing Pergamene victories over the Gauls, and were all presumably commissioned for military commanders. The Portonaccio sarcophagus is the best known and most elaborate of the main Antonine group, and shows both considerable similarities to the Great Ludovisi sarcophagus, the late outlier from about 250, and a considerable contrast in style and mood.

== Description ==
The chest is very high, with all the front covered in high reliefs of combat between Romans and barbarians. The complex battle is divided into four sections: two above with Roman cavalry, one with Roman infantry, and the last and lowest with the overwhelmed barbarians. At the center, forceful lines converge on the one figure, the cavalry general charging and who does not have a carved face.

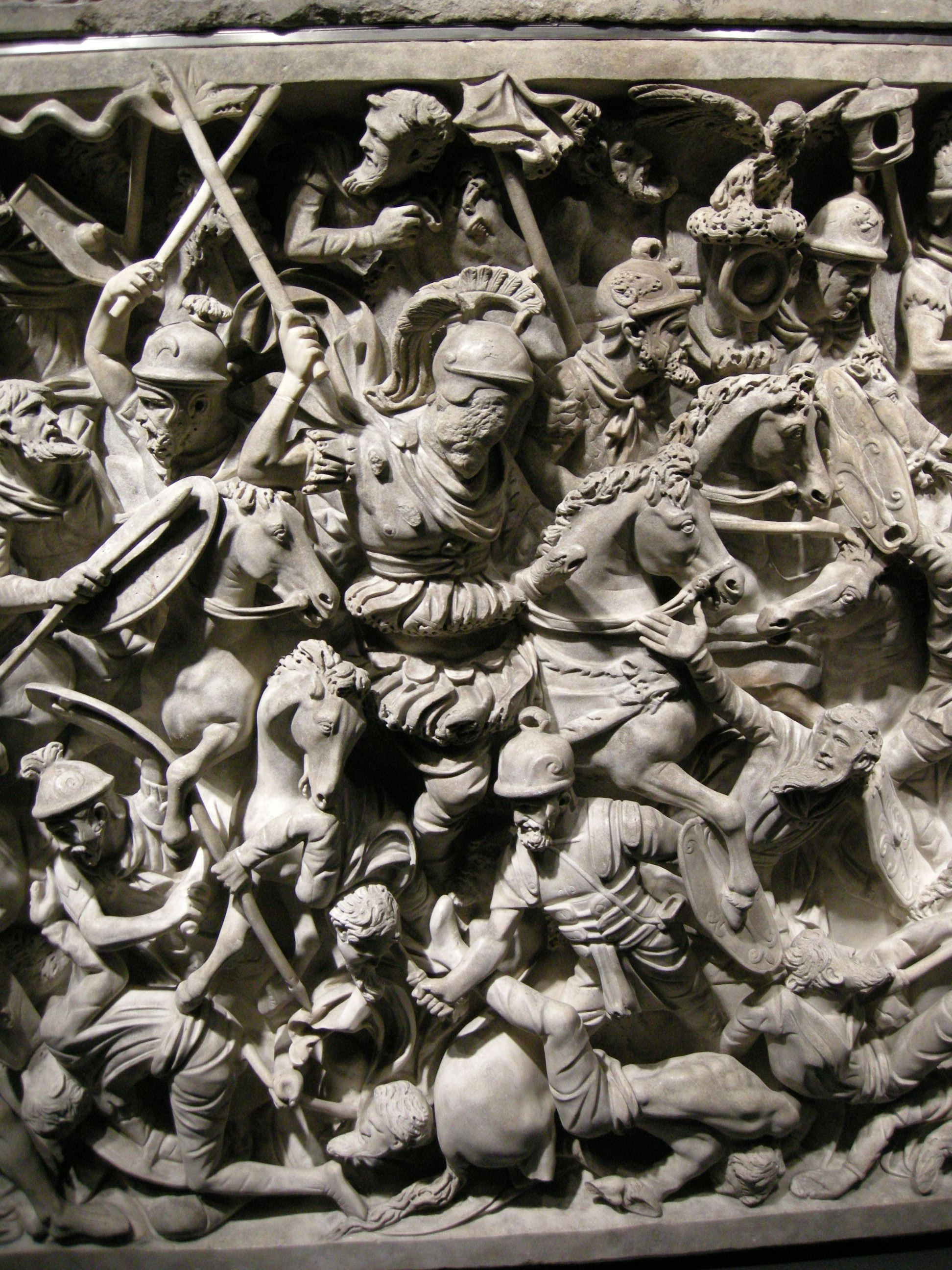
Detail of front, to centre, with the general

The face of the general is unfinished, either because the sculptors awaited a model to work from, or they had produced the work speculatively with no specific commission. There might either have been time to finish it before the burial or the sculptor might not have been able to learn the buyer's face. Some modern studies believe that the sculptors would create biographical scenes that would serve as illustration for anyone's life. The general and his wife are also each shown twice on the lid frieze, together holding each other's hands at the centre, and singly at the ends, again with unfinished faces.

Pairs of figures of an older man and a woman stand beneath trophies at either end of the main face, uninvolved in the battle. The barbarian at right is probably Suebian (Marcomanni, Quadi, or Buri) based on his hairstyle (a Suebian knot). The barbarian on the left is either a high German or a Sarmatic Iazyges. These are at the same scale as the general, and all the other battling figures are smaller; indeed, in defiance of any attempt at perspective, the soldiers and horses at the "front" of the scene in the lower part are somewhat smaller than their equivalents at the "back" in the upper part. The sarcophagus representations don't exhibit any sympathy for the conquered peoples—they are represented as coarse and despicable, crushed under the superior Romans.

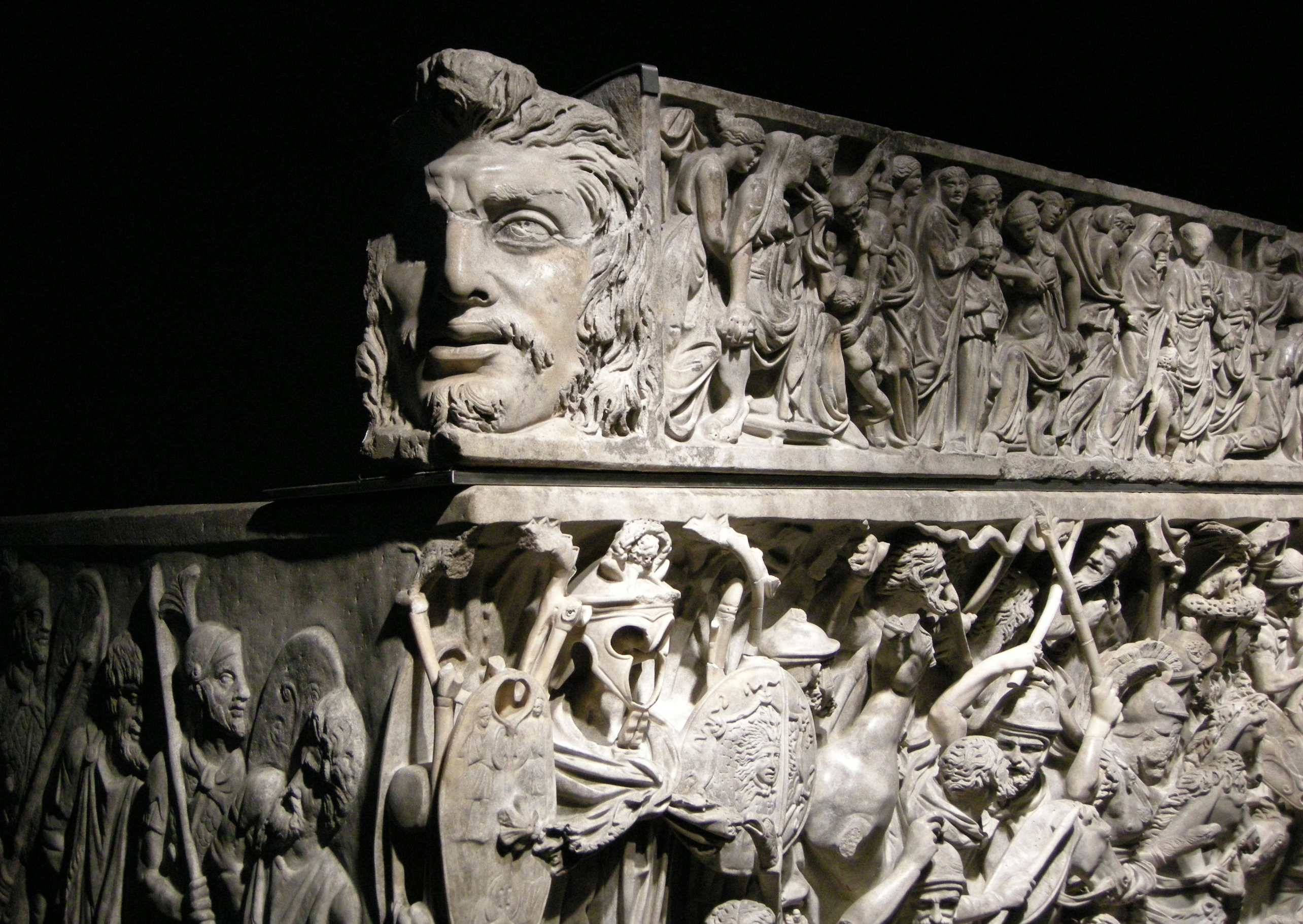
Detail of the corner of the sarcophagus

The cover of the sarcophagus has two large acroterions depicting gargoyles and is decorated with a low-relief frieze that depicts a life story (the presentation of a baby to its mother, his education, marriage, and a dedication to Clementia). The face, as on the main sarcophagus, is not depicted. The sarcophagus inscription suggests that it houses a general named Aulo Giulio Pompilio Tito Vivio Levillo Pisone Bereniciano.

== Style ==
From the Flavian era to the Antonine dynasty, one of the primary themes of Roman art was its military victories over other peoples outside its borders. Roman artists created these celebratory representations both in public space with triumphal arches, columns, and templates and private space (as in funerary reliefs and sarcophagi). In the 3rd century, the Roman senatorial class lost all its military power, so battle scenes were no longer used for their sarcophagi—they were often carved with representations of philosophers or muses instead.

The Portonaccio sarcophagus, compared to earlier works like the Sarcofago Amendola, avoids a Hellenistic manner. The sarcophagus exhibits a composition that is more frenetic and articulated, particularly when compared to sculptures of monomachy. The sculpture's sense of movement is accentuated by its high relief. Figures emerge in the round, while the background is frenzied, never neutral. The faces are expressive, the bodies of the victors dramatically tangled, their lances and symbols realistically cross the space, never appearing on only one plane. The sarcophagus cover is similar to the side reliefs, although it includes elements of Roman Arte plebea and Arte provinciale romana such as the uninterrupted narrative and the unnatural drapery.

== Gallery ==
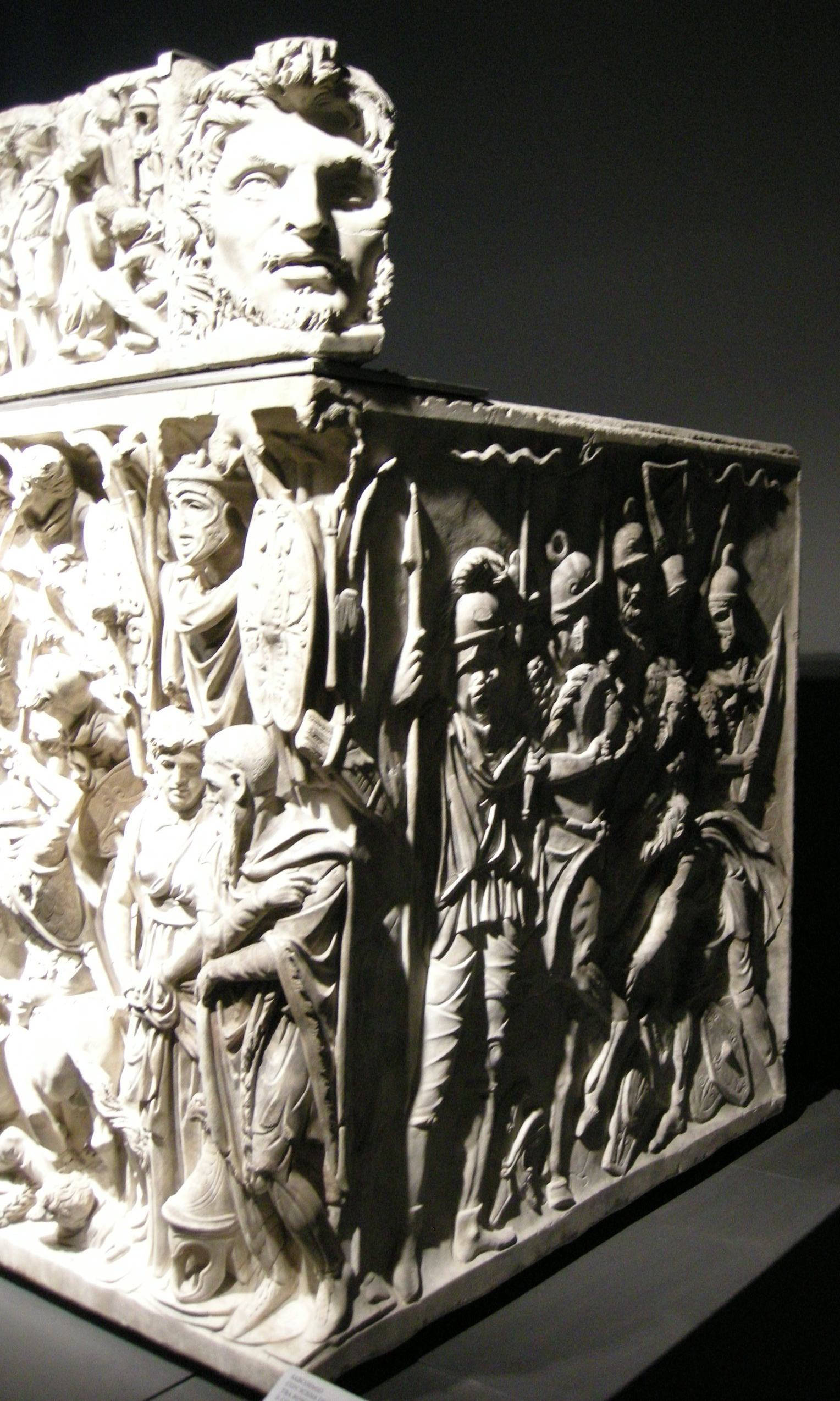
Left side

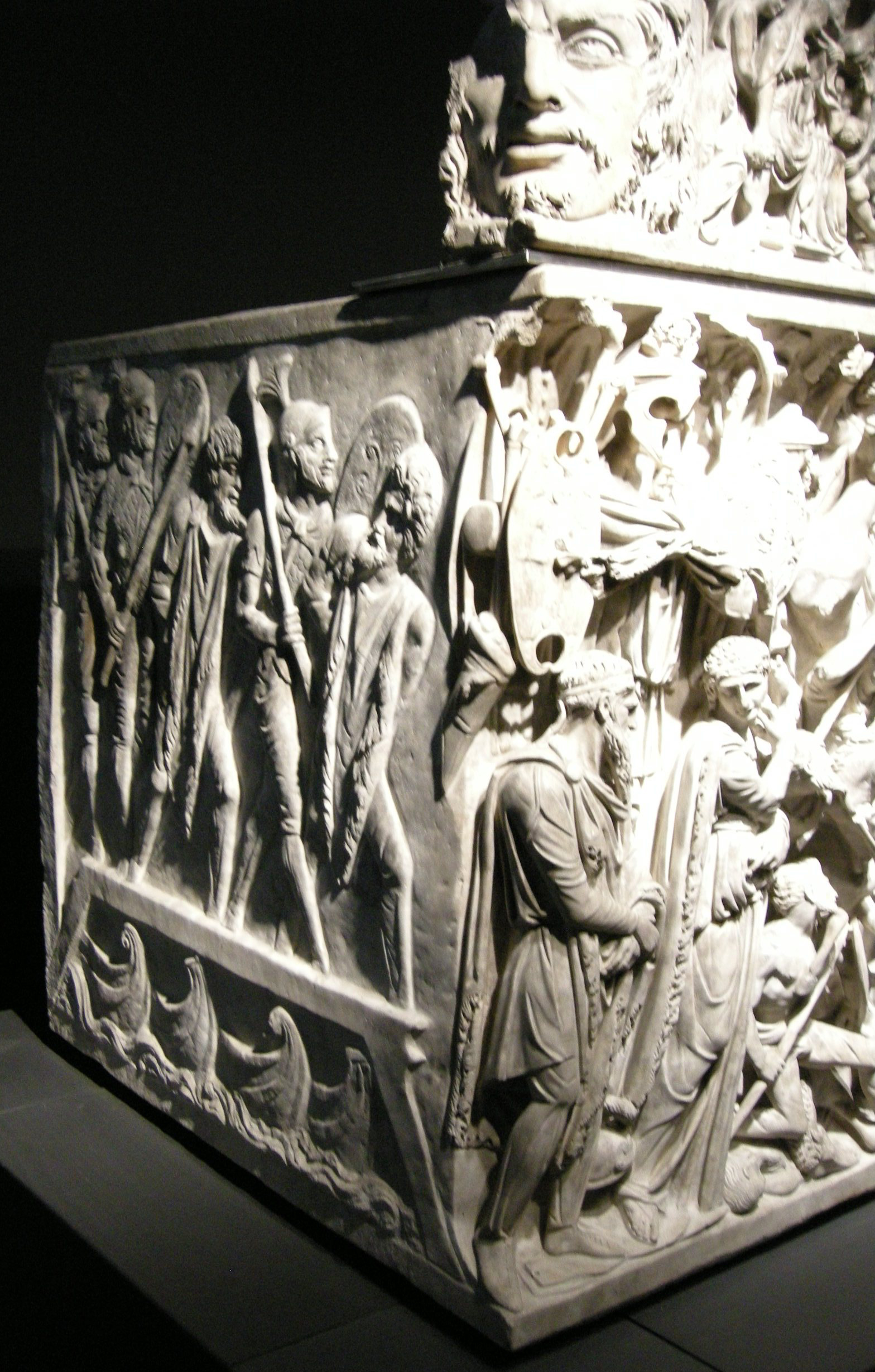
Right side

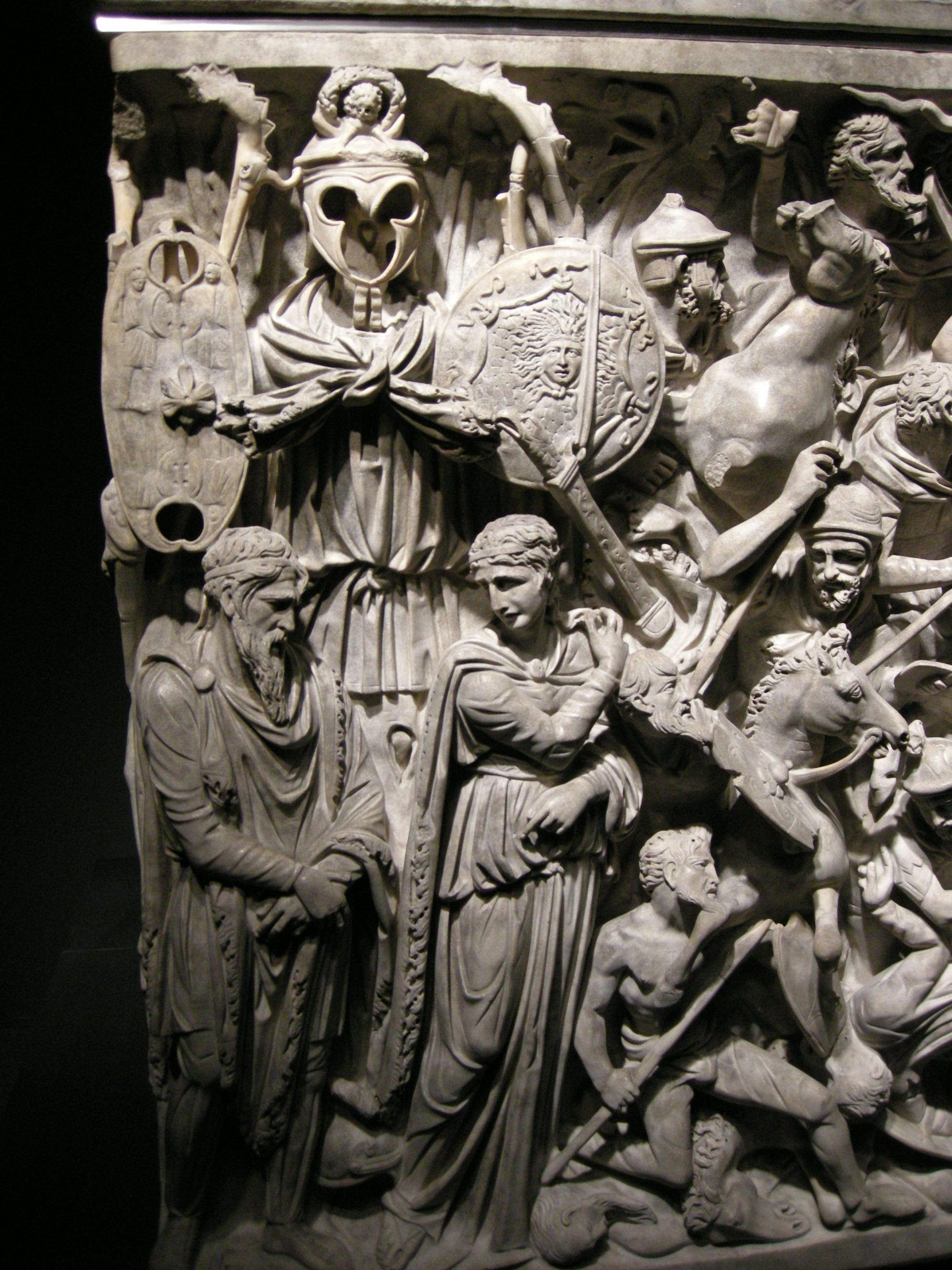
Detail of front, to left

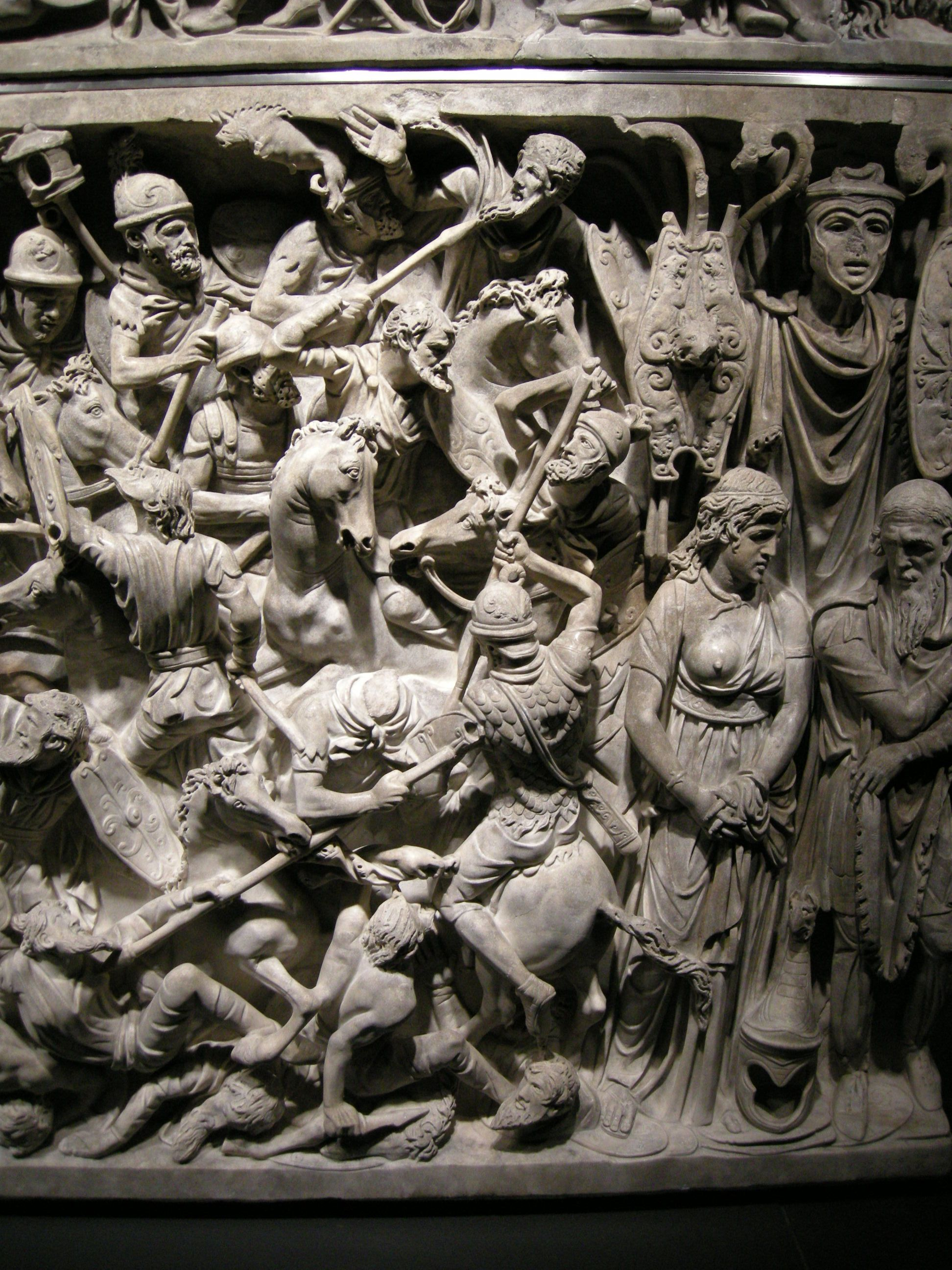
Detail of front, to right

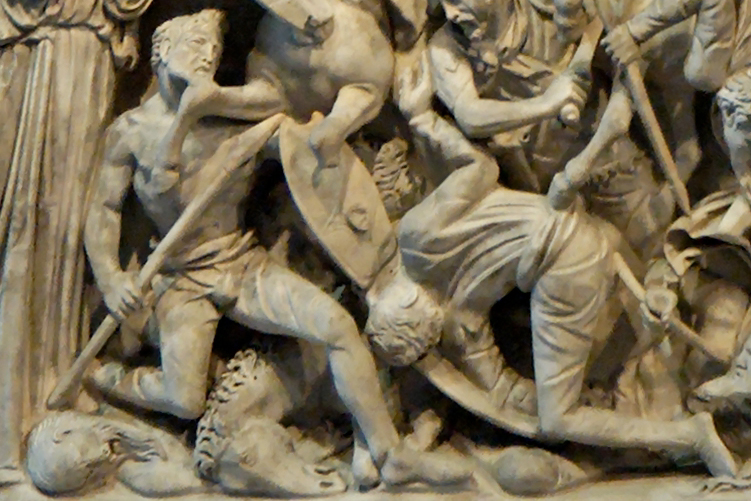
Detail of barbarians

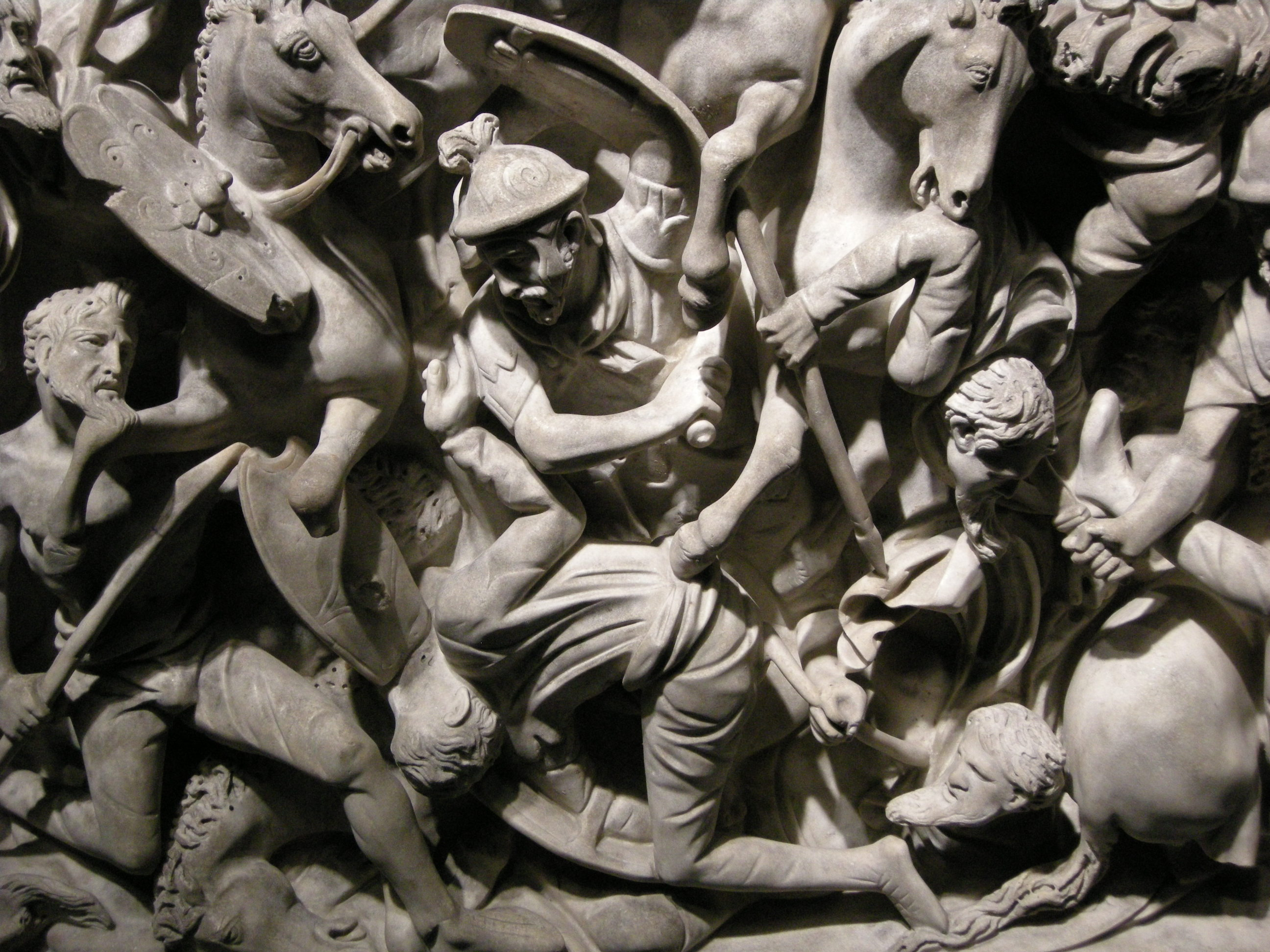

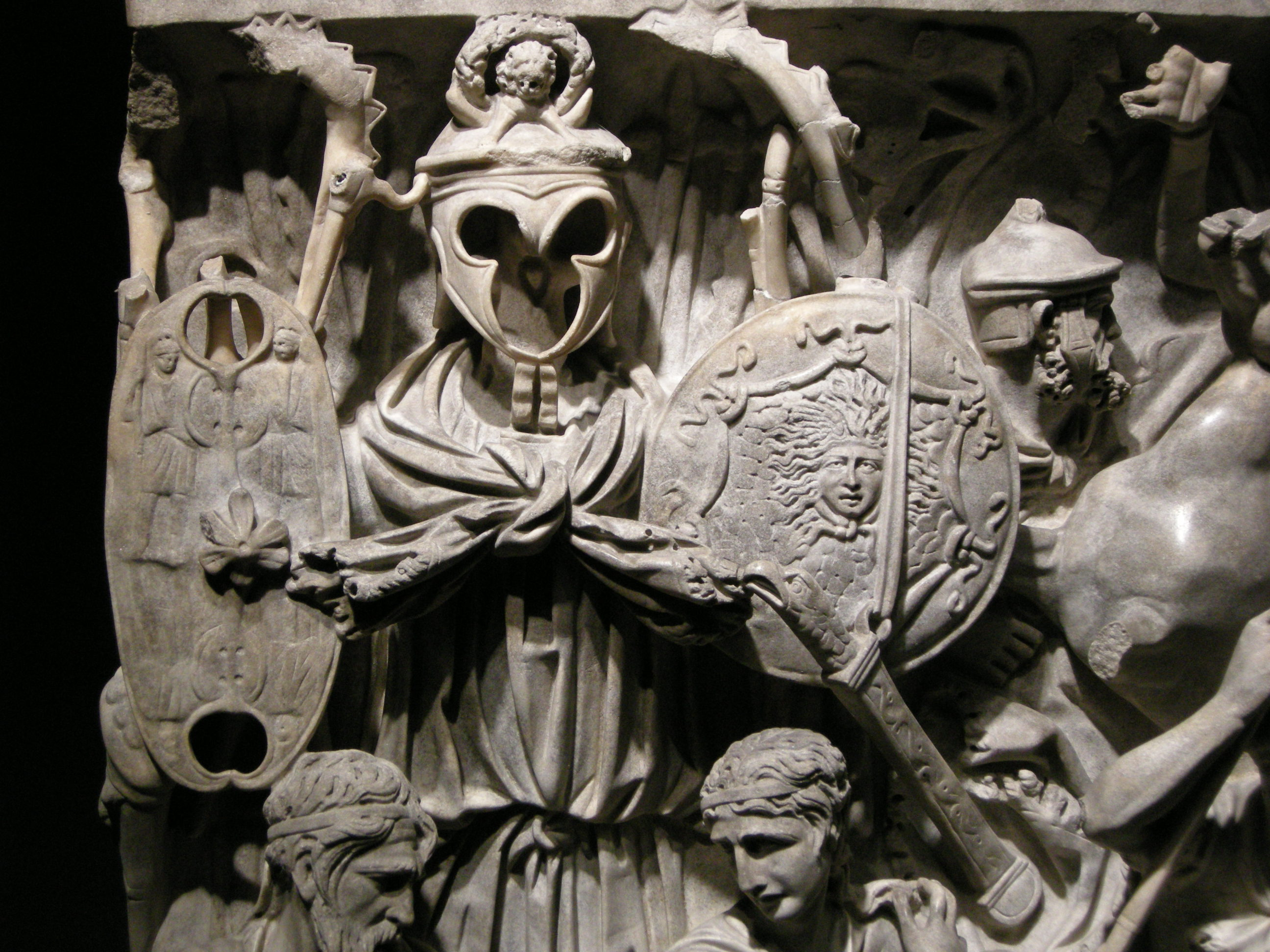
Trophies at the side of the front

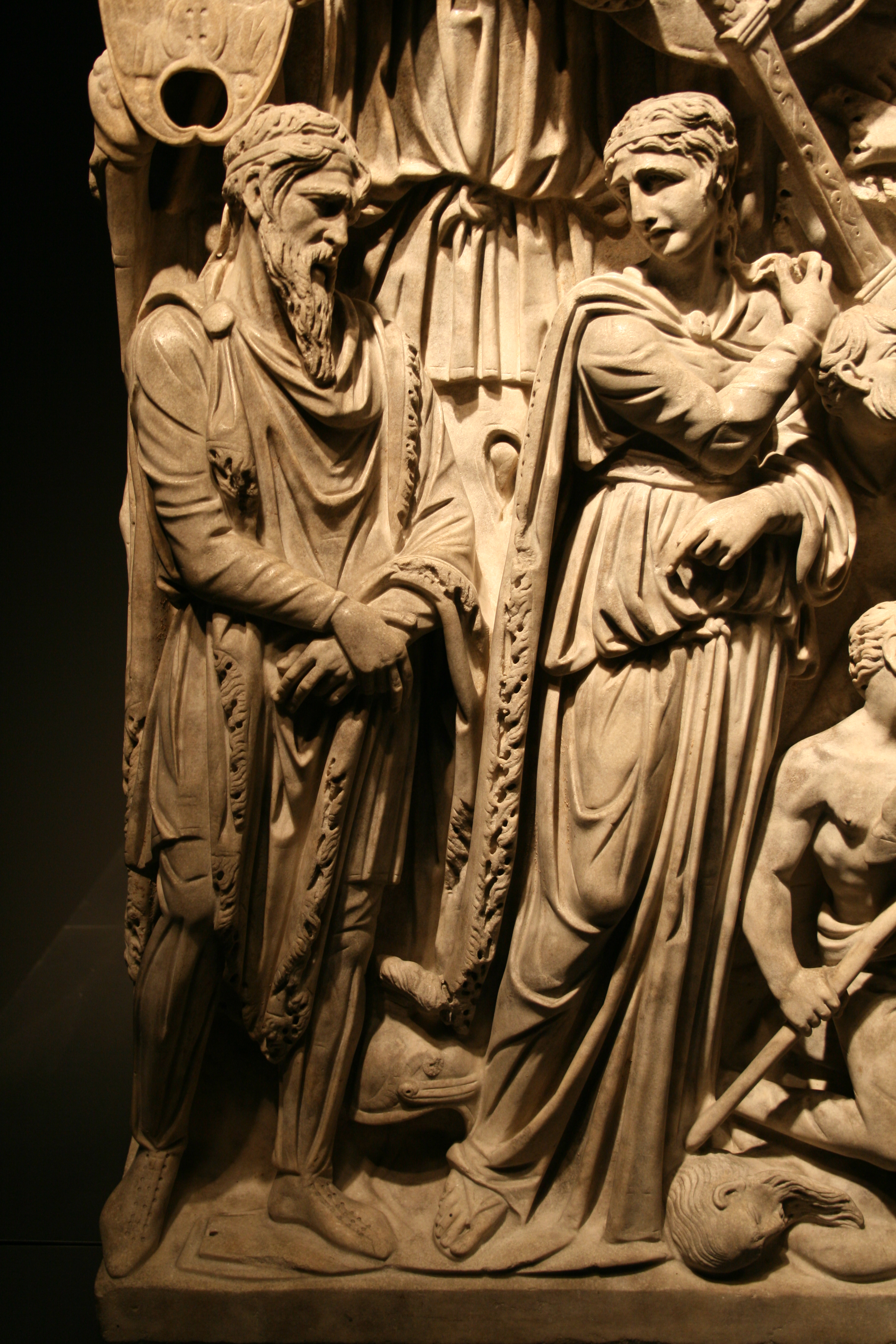

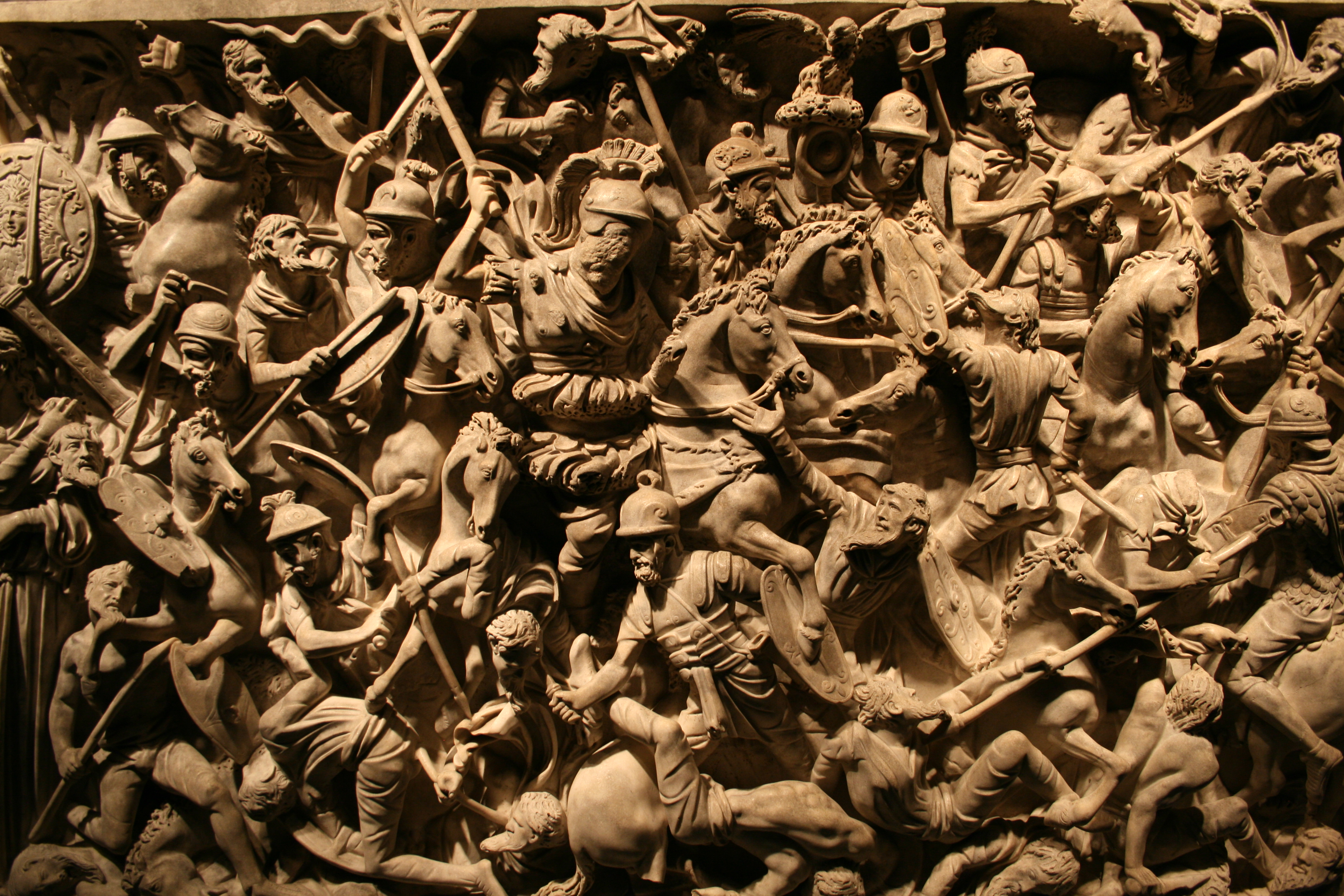

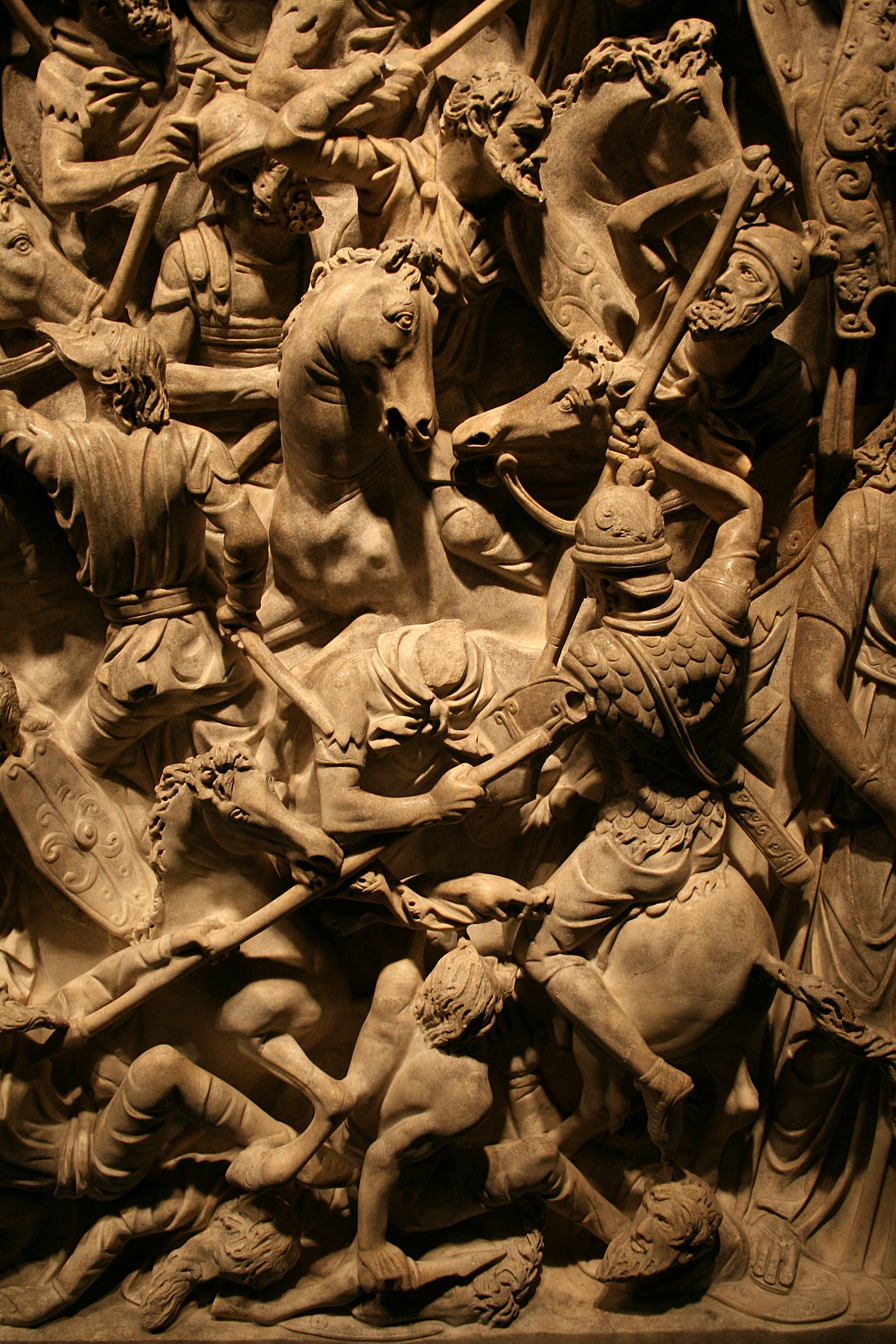

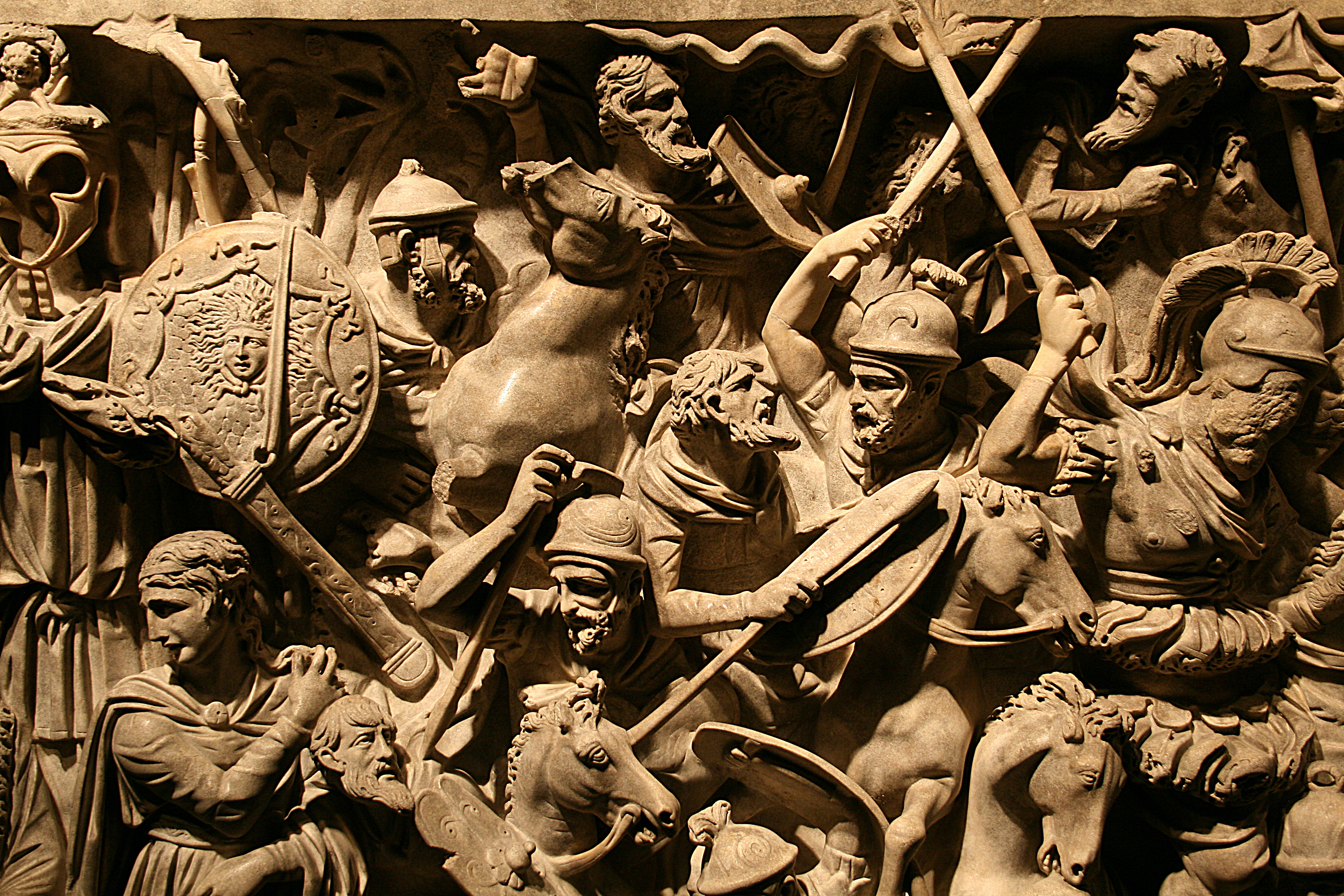

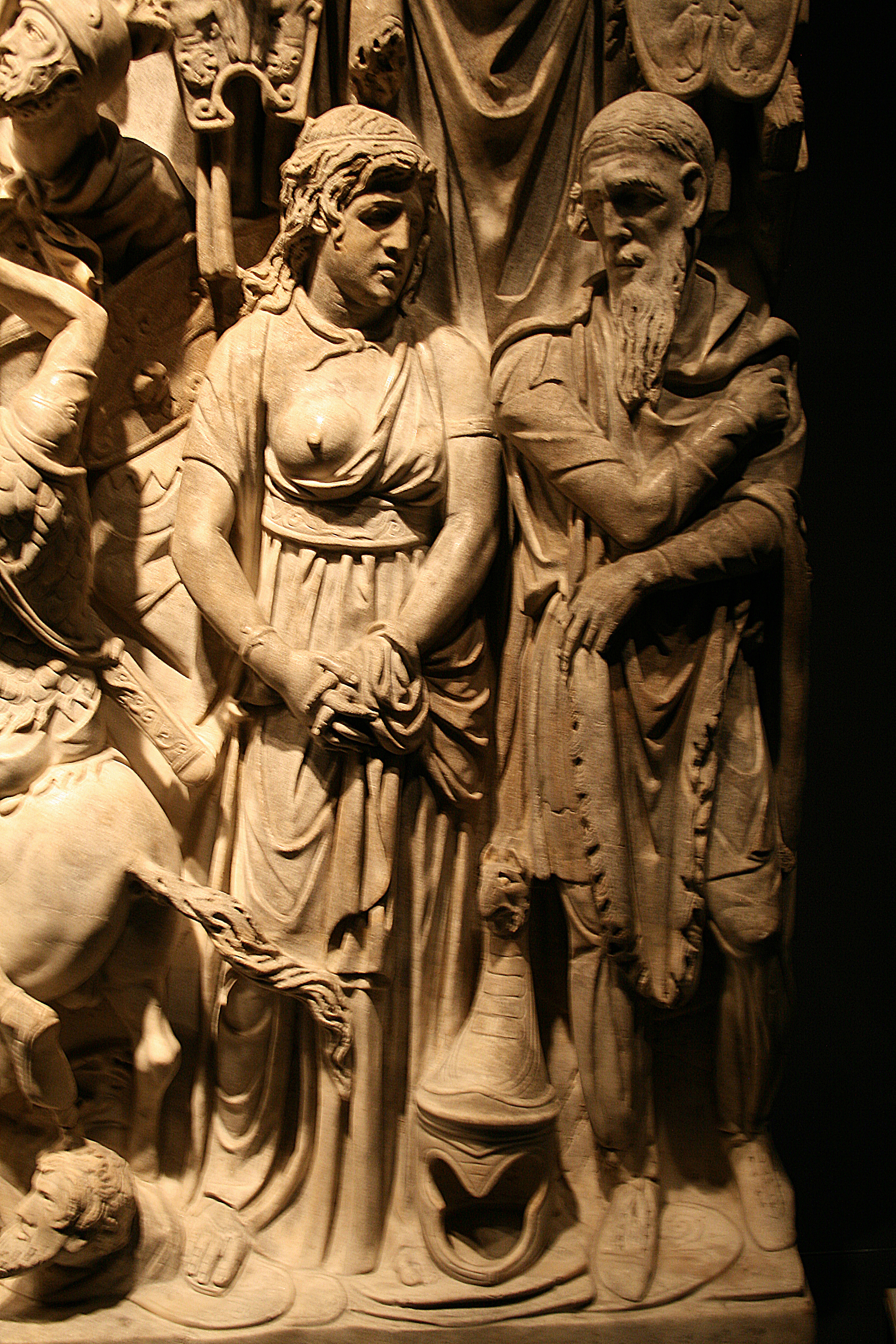

== Bibliography ==
- Huskinson, J. (1998). "Unfinished Portrait Heads' on Later Roman Sarcophagi: Some New Perspectives". PBSR. 66: 129–158.
- Adreae, Bernard (1968). "Imitazione ed originalità nei sarcofagi romani". RendPontAcc (in Italian). 41: 145–166.
- Pardyová, Marié (2006). "La représentation de bataille sur le sarcophage de Portonaccio et sa composition". Eirene (42): 135–151.
