= Mattia Pin =

Italian footballer

Personal information
- Date of birth: February 17, 1988 (age 38)
- Place of birth: Rome, Italy
- Position: Striker

Team information
- Current team: Crociati Noceto

Youth career
- Parma

Senior career*
Years	Team	Apps	(Gls)
2006–	Parma	0	(0)
2007	→ Sassuolo (loan)	5	(0)
2008	→ Cuoiopelli Cappiano (loan)	2	(0)
2008	→ Carpenedolo (loan)	3	(0)
2009	→ Castellarano (loan)	17	(2)
2009–	→ Crociati Noceto (loan)	20	(1)
- * Club domestic league appearances and goals as of 15:20, 10 May 2010 (UTC)

Mattia Pin (born February 17, 1988, in Rome) is an Italian professional football player currently playing for Lega Pro Seconda Divisione team Crociati Noceto on loan from Parma F.C.
