= Mattia Altobelli (footballer, born 1995) =

Italian footballer

Personal information
- Date of birth: 14 January 1995 (age 31)
- Place of birth: Termoli, Italy
- Height: 1.83 m (6 ft 0 in)
- Position: Centre back

Team information
- Current team: ASD Roccavivara

Youth career
- Pescara

Senior career*
Years	Team	Apps	(Gls)
2014–2016	Pescara	0	(0)
2014	→ Darfo Boario (loan)	14	(0)
2014–2015	→ Foggia (loan)	3	(0)
2015–2016	→ Maceratese (loan)	15	(1)
2016–2019	Teramo	25	(0)
2018	→ Siracusa (loan)	12	(1)
2019–2023	Vastese	92	(2)
2023–2024	Citta di Casalbordino		
2024	Termoli 2016		
2024–2025	ASD Virtus Cupello		
2025–	ASD Roccavivara		
- * Club domestic league appearances and goals as of 15:23, 11 October 2026 (UTC)

Mattia Altobelli (born 14 January 1995) is an Italian footballer who plays as a centre back for ASD Roccavivara.

== Biography ==
Born in Termoli, Molise region, Altobelli started his career at Pescara, an Abruzzese club. Altobelli was a player of the under-15 team in 2009–10 season, under-17 football team in 2010–11 season and 2011–12 season, as well as a player of the reserve team from 2012 to 2014. In January 2014, he was signed by Serie D club Darfo Boario, and in the summer of that year received a call-up for the first team of Pescara. However, before the closure of the transfer window, he was signed by Foggia in a temporary deal.

On 21 July 2015, Altobelli was signed by Maceratese in a temporary deal.

On 27 June 2016, he joined Teramo outright in a 3-year deal and wore the number 5 shirt for the team. He left the club in the summer of 2019 and joined the Serie D club Vastese Calcio 1902 on 16 November 2019.
