= Mattia Cadorin =

Italian painter

Mattia Cadorin (mid 17th century) (also known as Bolnetta) was an Italian engraver and publisher who flourished at Padua, Republic of Venice about 1648. He engraved after Titian and others. His plates are generally marked Cadorin.
