= Mattia Cherubini =

Italian footballer

Personal information
- Date of birth: 4 March 1988 (age 38)
- Position: Defender

Youth career
- Parma

Senior career*
Years	Team	Apps	(Gls)
2007–2008	Parma	0	(0)
2007–2008	→ Carpi (loan)	7	(0)
2008	Virtus Castelfranco	8	(0)
2008–2009	Feralpi Lonato	21	(0)
2009–2011	Giacomense	36	(0)
- * Club domestic league appearances and goals

Mattia Cherubini (born 4 March 1988) is a former Italian footballer.
