= Rama Raya's Southern Expedition =

- Part of Rebellions In Tamilnadu
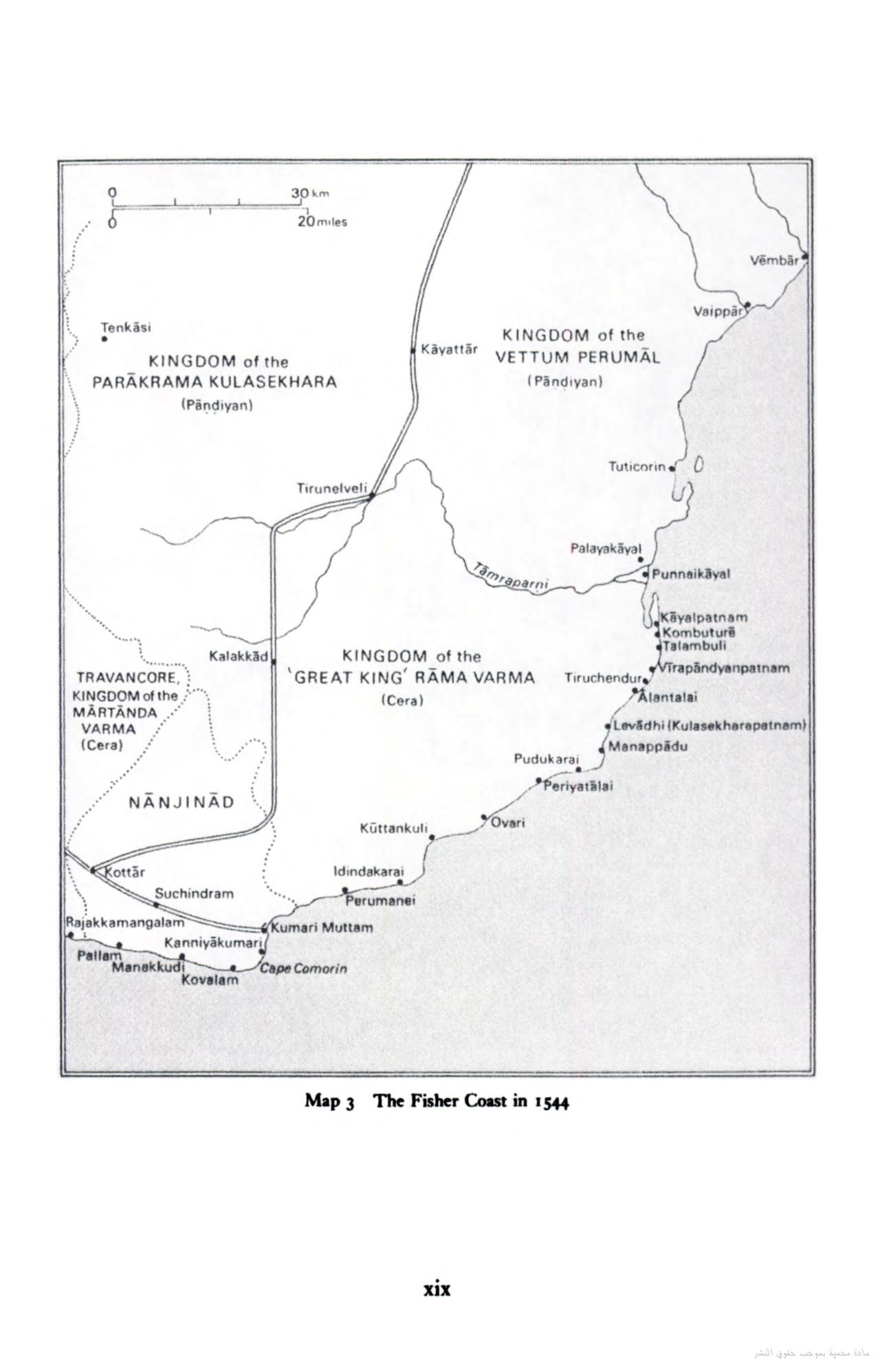
Date	1543-1544
Location	Tamilnadu, India
Result	Vijayanagara victory

Belligerents
Vijayanagara Empire; Tenkasi Pandyas	(Portuguese Empire) Portuguese Empire; Venad Kingdom; Rebel Polygars; Kallars; Maravars

Commanders and leaders
Rama Raya; Chinna Timma; Vitthala Raja; Parakrama Kulashekaran	(Portuguese Empire) Martim Afonso de Sousa; Unni Kerala Varma (surrendered); Bettumperumal (surrendered)

Rama Raya's Southern Expedition was a military expedition undertaken by Rama Raya under the command of Rama Raya's cousins Chinna Timma and Vitthala to suppress rebellions, counter Portuguese interference and restore Vijayanagara authority in the southern provinces. The expedition began with the capture of Chandragiri and the subjugation of Tondaimandalam, followed by campaigns in the Chola and Pandya territories. The Vijayanagara army captured Bhuvanagiri Fort attacked the Portuguese-held port of Nagore and recovered the wealth of the Ranganatha temple. Chinna Timma then marched into the Pandya territories and Travancore, defeating the forces of the Five Tiruvadis at Tovala Pass and subduing the Travancore ruler Unni Kerala Varma.

== Background ==
Following Sadasiva Raya's coronation at Vijayanagara in 1542, Rama Raya turned his attention to the southern provinces of the empire, where widespread unrest had emerged. The southern chiefs and nobles, who had opposed Rama Raya's rise to power after the imprisonment of Achyuta Deva Raya remained unwilling to submit to his authority.

Portuguese missionaries were also causing unrest in the far southern provinces. They converted large numbers of Paravas along the Fishery Coast to Christianity and encouraged them to recognise the King of Portugal as their overlord, which challenged Vijayanagara's authority in the region. Furthermore, Portuguese involvement with rebellious southern chiefs and the raids conducted by the Portuguese Governor of Goa against wealthy Hindu temples in South India added to the concerns of the Vijayanagara court.

Rama Raya therefore dispatched a large army under his cousins, Chinna Timma and Vitthala, to suppress the rebellions, counter Portuguese interference and re-establish Vijayanagara authority throughout the southern provinces.

== Expedition ==
The expedition set out from Vijayanagara. Chinna Timma first captured Chandragiri in the northern part of present-day Chittoor district. After suppressing the rebels, he brought Tondaimandalam under Vijayanagara control. He then marched into the Chola country, captured Bhuvanagiri Fort and attacked the port of Nagore where he defeated the Portuguese, and recovered the wealth of the Ranganatha temple that had been seized. He then crossed the Kaveri River and entered the Pudukkottai region where he collected tribute from local chiefs of Kallars and Maravars who had withheld payments from the Vijayanagara government during the period of unrest.

Chinna Timma continued his advance southwards and reached Madurai without opposition. There he met the Pandya ruler of Tenkasi who sought his assistance against Bettumperumal, the ruler of Tuticorin and Kayattar. The forces of the Five Tiruvadis, a group of small principalities in Travancore confronted Chinna Timma's army at Tovala Pass but were defeated and dispersed. The Vijayanagara army then invaded the rest of Travancore. Its ruler Unni Kerala Varma was defeated but later received favourable treatment and was allowed to retain control over much of his former territory.

== Aftermath ==
After successfully subduing the whole southern provunce Chinna Timma erected a victory pillar at Cape Comorin (Kanyakumari).

== See also ==
- Babur
- Kingdom of Mewar
- Chandragiri Fort
