= Chandragiri (disambiguation) =

Chandragiri may refer to places in:

== India ==
- Chandragiri, a suburb and neighborhood of Tirupati in Tirupati district, Andhra Pradesh
- Chandragiri mandal, a mandal (or tehsil) in Tirupati district, Andhra Pradesh
- Chandragiri Hill, a hill in Shravanabelagola, Karnataka
- Chandragiri Hill, a hill in Jintur, Maharashtra
- Chandragiri, Odisha, a gram panchayat in Gajapati district, Odisha
- Chandragiri Fort, Andhra Pradesh, a fort in Tirupati, Andhra Pradesh
- Chandragiri Fort, Kerala, a 17th-century fort in Kasargod district, Kerala
- Chandragiri River, also Payaswini, a river in India

== Nepal ==
- Chandragiri Hill, Nepal, a hill in Kathmandu district
- Chandragiri Municipality, a municipality in Kathmandu district

== See also ==
- Chandragiri Fort (disambiguation)
- Chandragiri Vatika, Jain monument in Rajasthan, India
- Chandradrona hills or Baba Budangiri, hill in Karnataka, India
