= Rangeela =

Rangeela (lit. 'colourful') may refer to:

- Muhammad Shah "Rangeela" (reigned 1719–1748), 13th Mughal emperor, known as Rangeela from his penname and due to his patronage of the arts and pleasure seeking
- Rangeela (actor) (1937–2005), Pakistani film actor
- Rangeela (1970 film), a Pakistani Urdu-language film
- Rangeela (1995 film), a 1995 Indian Hindi-language romantic comedy drama film by Ram Gopal Varma, starring Aamir Khan, Urmila Matondkar and Jackie Shroff
  - "Rangeela Re", title song of the 1995 film by A. R. Rahman, Asha Bhosle and Aditya Narayan
- Rangeela (upcoming film), an upcoming Indian Malayalam-language film
- Rangeela (album), a 2013 album by Shireen Jawad

== See also ==
- Rang (disambiguation)
- Rangin (disambiguation)
- "Rangeela Rangeela", a song by A. R. Rahman, Mano and Sujatha Mohan from the 1995 Indian film Muthu
- Rangeelay, a 2013 Indian Punjabi-language romantic action comedy film by Navaniat Singh, starring Jimmy Sheirgill and Neha Dhupia
