= Rangin =

Rangin or Rangeen (Persian: رنگ, colorful) may refer to:

== People ==
- Rangin Dadfar Spanta, former Afghan politician and cabinet member in Hamid Karzai's government
- Saadat Yaar Khan Rangin, 18th/19th century Urdu poet

== Other ==
- "Rangin", a song by Sajjad Ali

== See also ==
- Rang (disambiguation)
- Rangin Ban, Iran
- Rangin Jajabara, 1975 Indian Odia-language film
