= Ranganathan =

Ranganathan is a South Indian surname. It is derived from the Sanskrit name Ranganatha, which is the name of the Hindu god Vishnu, as depicted resting on the nāga Shesha. The name derives from the Sanskrit words ranga, meaning "place of assembly," and natha, meaning "protector," and thus by extension the name literally means "protector of the place of assembly."

It may refer to:

- B. Ranganathan, breast cancer technologist
- Pradeep Ranganathan, Indian film director and actor
- R. Madhavan, film actor
- Ramesh Ranganathan, Chief Justice of Uttarakhand High Court
- Romesh Ranganathan, English stand-up comedian
- S. R. Ranganathan, mathematician and librarian
- Shoba Ranganathan, Indian Australian biochemist
- T. Ranganathan, musician

== See also ==
- Ranganatha Temple (disambiguation)
- Ranga (disambiguation)
- Nath (disambiguation)
