= Chandragiri Fort =

Chandragiri fort may refer to these forts in India:

- Chandragiri Fort, Kerala
- Chandragiri Fort, Andhra Pradesh

== See also ==
- Chandragiri (disambiguation)
