= Rung =

Rung may refer to:

- Rung (album), an album by Hadiqa Kiyani
- Rung languages, a proposed group of Tibeto-Burman languages
- Rung, an ethnic group of people inhabiting the Pithoragarh district of Uttarakhand, India and Darchula district, Nepal
- Rung (tele-serial), a Kokborok drama tele-serial
- Rung, a step of a ladder
- Rung, a card game in Pakistan
- Henrik Rung (1807–1871), a Danish composer
- Rung (biology) – a connection between two helices in a nucleic acid double helix

== See also ==
- Rang (disambiguation)
- Rng (algebra), pronounced as rung
