= Rangan =

Rangan may refer to:

- Rangan, Razavi Khorasan, a village in Razavi Khorasan Province
- Venkat Rangan, Indian computer scientist
- Gumbok Rangan, a mountain of India
- Rangan Chakraborty (b. 1957), Indian filmmaker

== See also ==
- Ranga (disambiguation)
- Rang (disambiguation)
