= Ranga =

Ranga may refer to:

- Akita ranga, a Japanese school of Dutch-style painting
- Konda Venkata Ranga Reddy (1890–1970), Indian politician in Andhra Pradesh, participant in the Telangana rebellion
- N G Ranga, Indian leader
- Ranga Sohoni (1918–1993), Indian Test cricketer
- S. V. Ranga Rao (1918–1974), South Indian actor, director and producer
- Ranga and Billa, perpetrators of the 1978 Geeta and Sanjay Chopra kidnapping case in Delhi, India
- Ranga (1982 film), a 1982 Indian Tamil-language film
- Ranga (2022 film), a 2022 Indian Tamil-language film
- Ranga The Donga, a 2010 Indian Telugu-language film

== Places ==
- Ranga Reddy district, a district in Andhra Pradesh, India; named after Konda Venkata Ranga Reddy
- Ytri Rangá and Eystri-Rangá, rivers in Iceland
- Ranga, Sahibganj, village in Jharkhand, India

== Other uses ==
- The Ananga Ranga, an Indian love manual
- Karnataka Kranti Ranga, a regional political party in Karnataka, India
- Neo Ranga, an anime television series
- Parambassis ranga, the Indian glassy fish
- Ranga, Yolngu (a northern Australian Aboriginal language) term for sacred object
- Ragna Crimson, a high fantasy manga
- Ranga, an Australian term for people with orange or red hair
- Ranga (ship), a container ship wrecked off the coast of Ireland
- Ranganatha, a Hindu deity

== See also ==
- Rang (disambiguation)
- Rangan (disambiguation)
- Ranganathan (disambiguation)
- Rangam, a 1985 Indian film
