= Rang =

Rang may refer to:

- Rang (1993 film), a Bollywood romance film
- Rang (2014 film), a Tulu film
- Rang (TV channel), an Assamese language television channel
- Rang, Doubs, a commune in the Doubs department, France

== See also ==
- Rangi (disambiguation)
- Rung (disambiguation)
- Rangeela (disambiguation)
- Rangin (disambiguation)
- Ranga (disambiguation)
- Rangan (disambiguation)
