= Rangin Ban =

Rangin Ban (Persian: رنگين بان) may refer to:

- Rangin Ban, Rumeshkhan, in Rumeshkhan County of Lorestan Province, Iran
- Rangin Ban, Pol-e Dokhtar, in Pol-e Dokhtar County of Lorestan Province, Iran
