= Ranganatha Temple =

Ranganatha Temple or Ranganathaswamy Temple may refer to any of several temples dedicated to the Hindu God Ranganatha, including:

Ranganatha

- Ranganatha Temple, Nellore, in Andhra Pradesh
- Ranganatha Temple, Thiruneermalai, in Tamil Nadu

Ranganathaswamy

- Ranganathaswamy Temple, Jiyaguda, in Andhra Pradesh
- Ranganathaswamy Temple, Karamadai, in Tamil Nadu
- Ranganathaswamy Temple, Shivanasamudra, in Karnataka
- Ranganathaswamy Temple, Srirangam, in Tamil Nadu
- Ranganathaswamy Temple, Srirangapatna, in Karnataka
- Shri Ranganathaswamy aka Sarangapani Temple, Kumbakonam, Tamilnadu

== See also ==
- Ranganathan (disambiguation)
- Nanakramguda Temple, also called Sri Ranganadha swamy temple, in Telangana, India
