= Chandragiri Fort, Kerala =

Chandragiri Fort ചന്ദ്രഗിരി കോട്ട
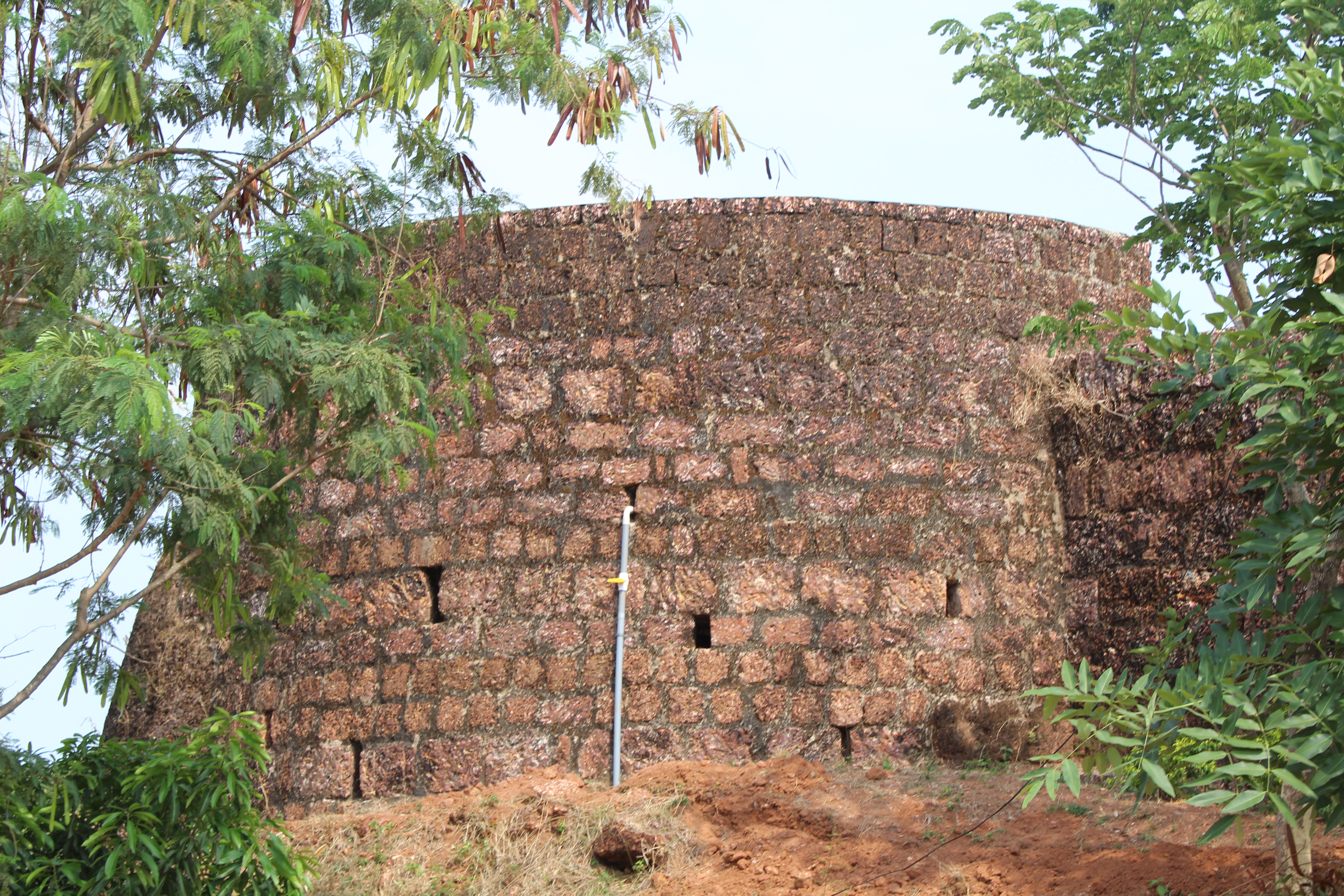
- Chandragiri Fort in Kasargod, Kerala

- Location within Kerala Location within India
- Coordinates: 12.466946°N 75.003248°E
- Country: India
- State: Kerala
- District: Kasargod District
- Region: North Malabar (Kolathnadu)
- Taluk: Kasaragod
- Language: Malayalam
- Time zone: UTC+5:30 (IST)

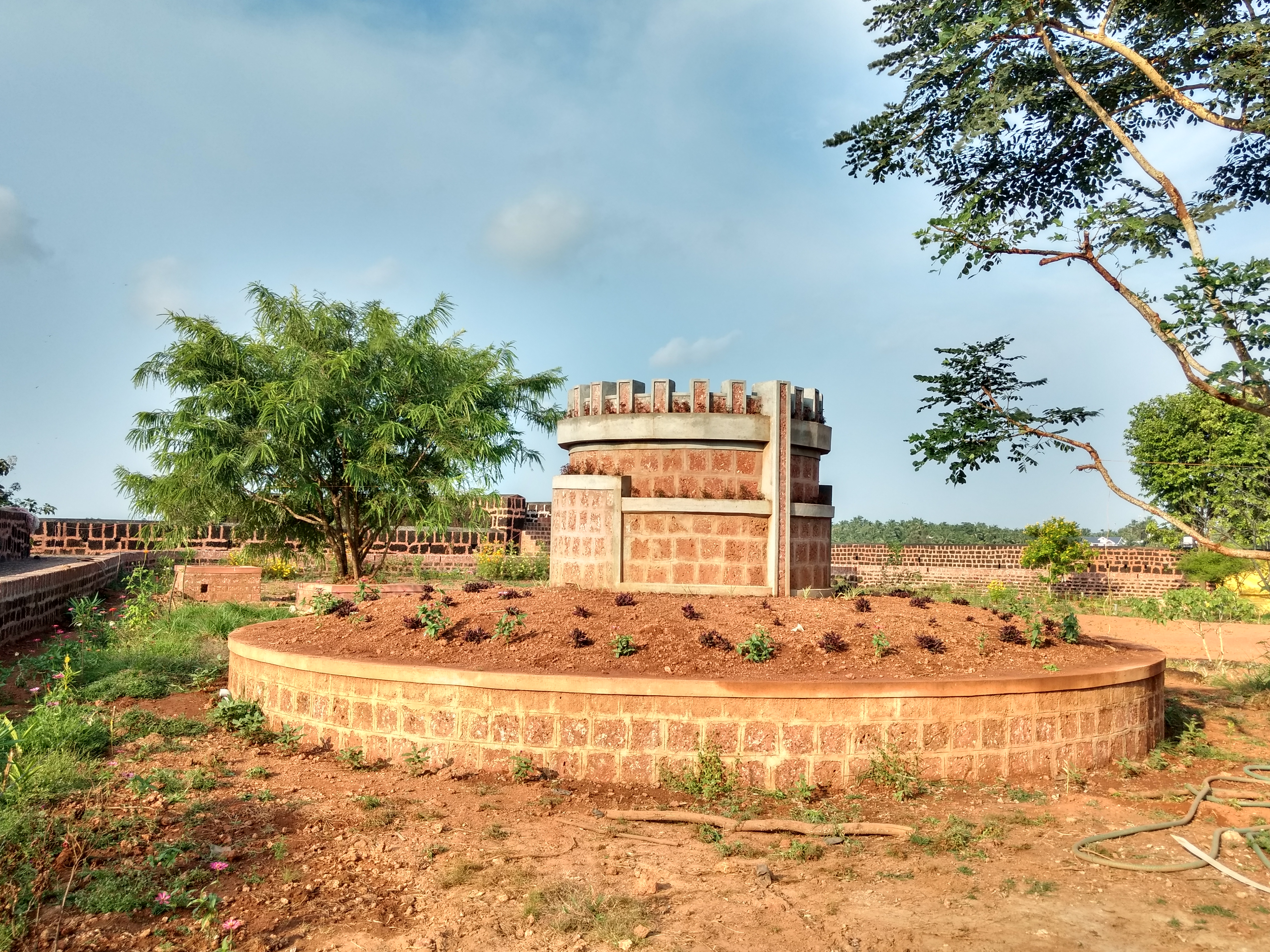
A structure in the Chandragiri Fort

Chandragiri Fort (Malayalam: ചന്ദ്രഗിരിക്കോട്ട ) is a fort built in the 17th century, situated in Kasaragod District of Kerala, India. This large squarish fort is 150 feet (46 m) above sea level and occupies an area of about seven acres the adjacent to Chandragiri river. The fort is now in ruins.

== Geography ==
Chandragiri Fort was built in the confluence of the Arabian Sea and the Chandragiri River, also known as the Payaswini river. The fort is located about 59 kilometers south of Mangalore and 87 kilometers north of Kannur.

== History ==
The Chandragiri River marked the boundary between the Tulanadu and the Kolathanadu Kingdoms. Both kingdoms would eventually be conquered by the Vijaynagara Empire, and the region came under their control. Upon the fall of the Vijaynagara Empire, the Keladi Nayakas, who had administered the region for the Vijaynagara Empire, declared independence and took control of many regions of Uttara Kannada, including the area the fort would later be built.

Chandragiri Fort was built in the 17th century by Shivappa Nayak, alongside a chain of other fortresses. As of today, the fort is managed by the Kerala State Department of Archaeology, with assistance from the Department of Tourism. The Department of Archeology conducted an excavation and uncovered cannonballs made of stone and iron, iron tools, and pottery.

== Layout ==
The found boundary area is approximately 7.76 acres, while the building is roughly 5 acres and of a square shape. The fort is 46 meters (150) feet above sea level, and composed of laterite bricks. Some of the walls were damaged by cannon fire. A trench surrounds the fort from three directions. On the Eastern and Western direction, both have entrances leading into the trench. On the North-Eastern corner, an underground tunnel is also visible.

The fort contains 8 bastions, each with cannon (peeranky) holes. The main bastion is located on the North. Other buildings, such as barracks, are also within the fort.

== Image gallery ==
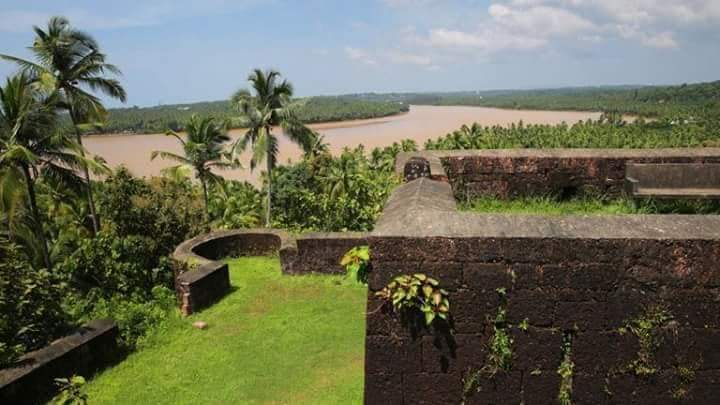
Chandrigiri Fort Melparamba, is 6 Kilometers away from Kasaragod town

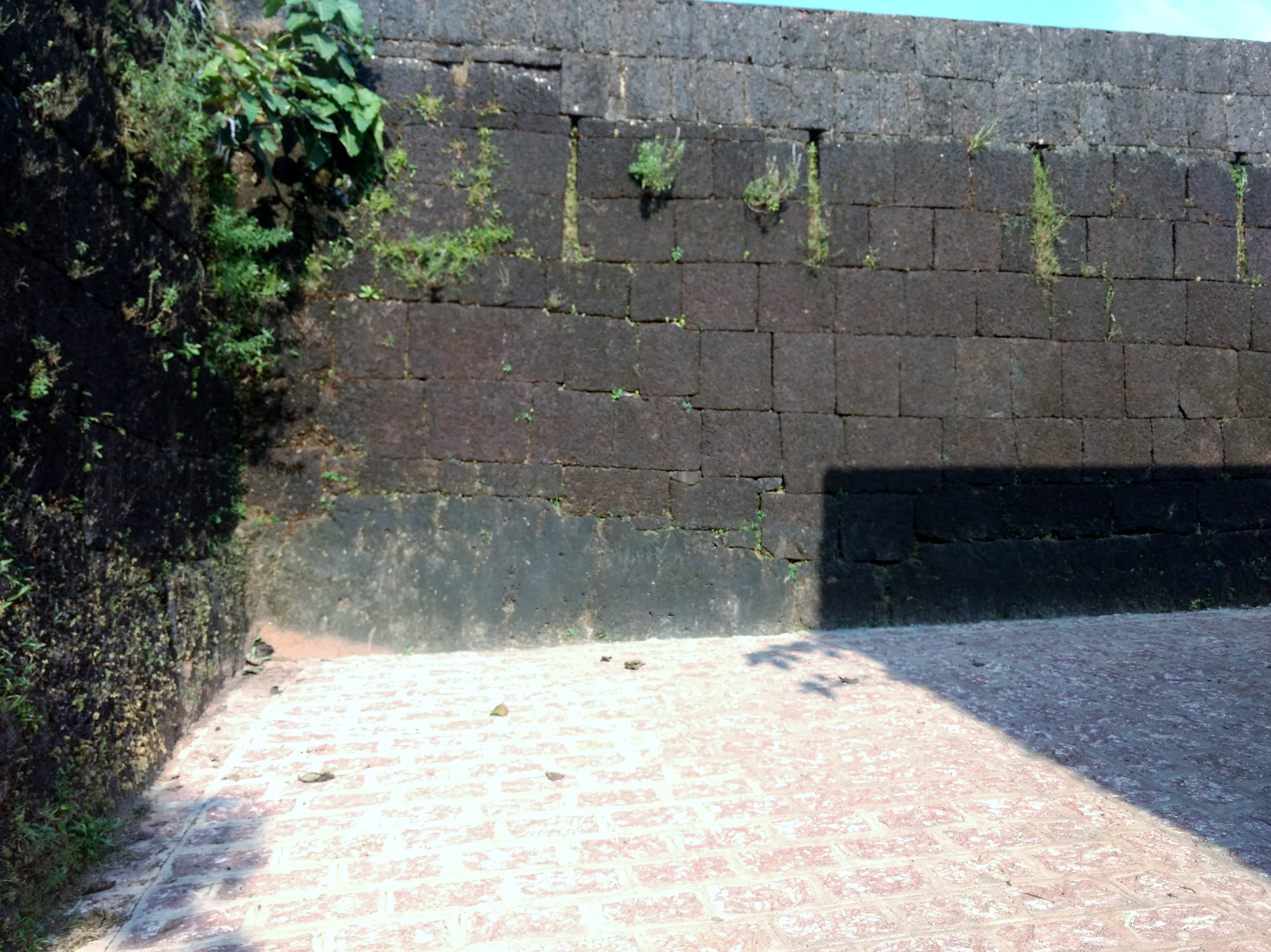
Chandragiri Fort renovation works 2019

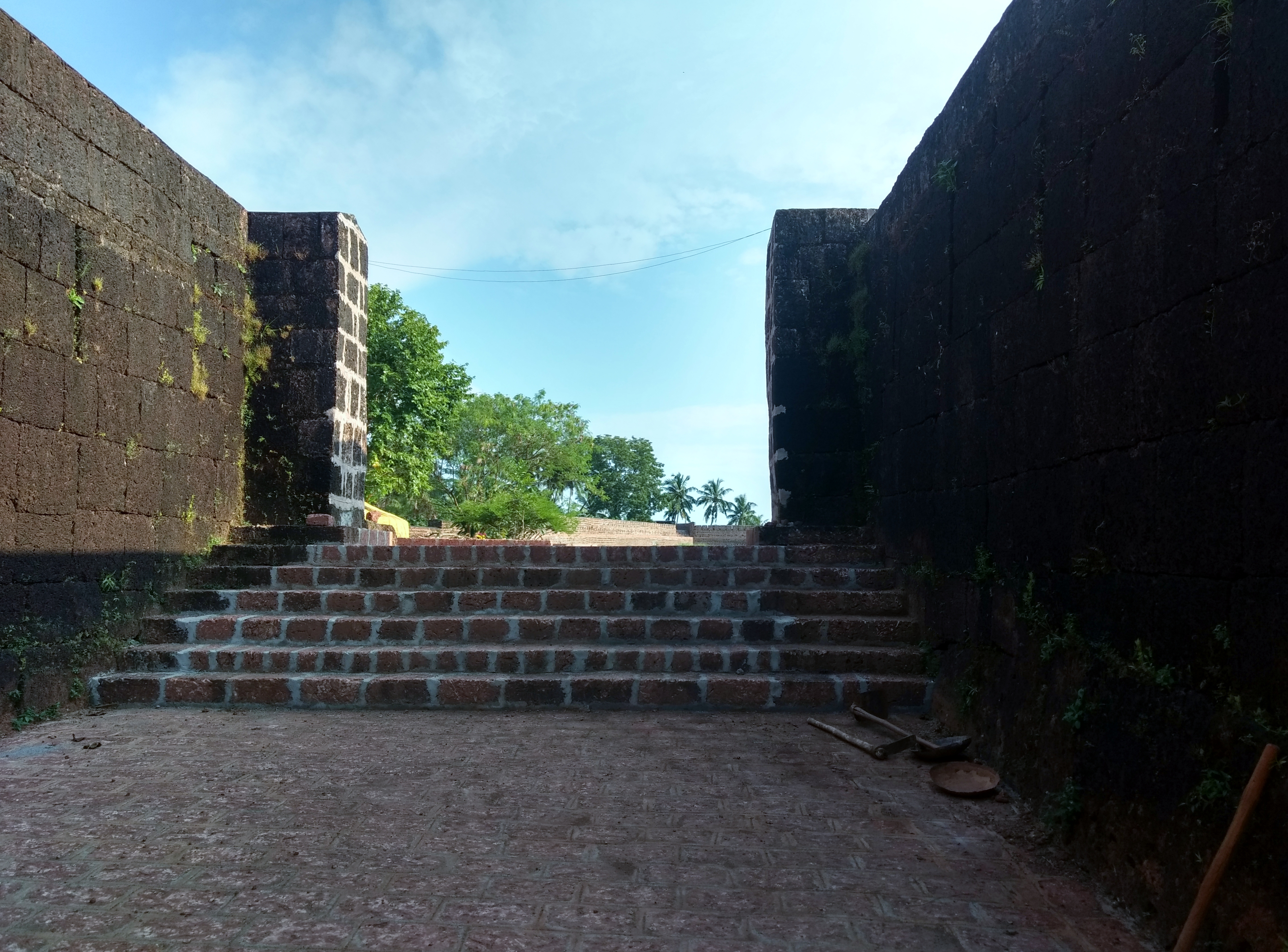
Chandragiri Fort entrance

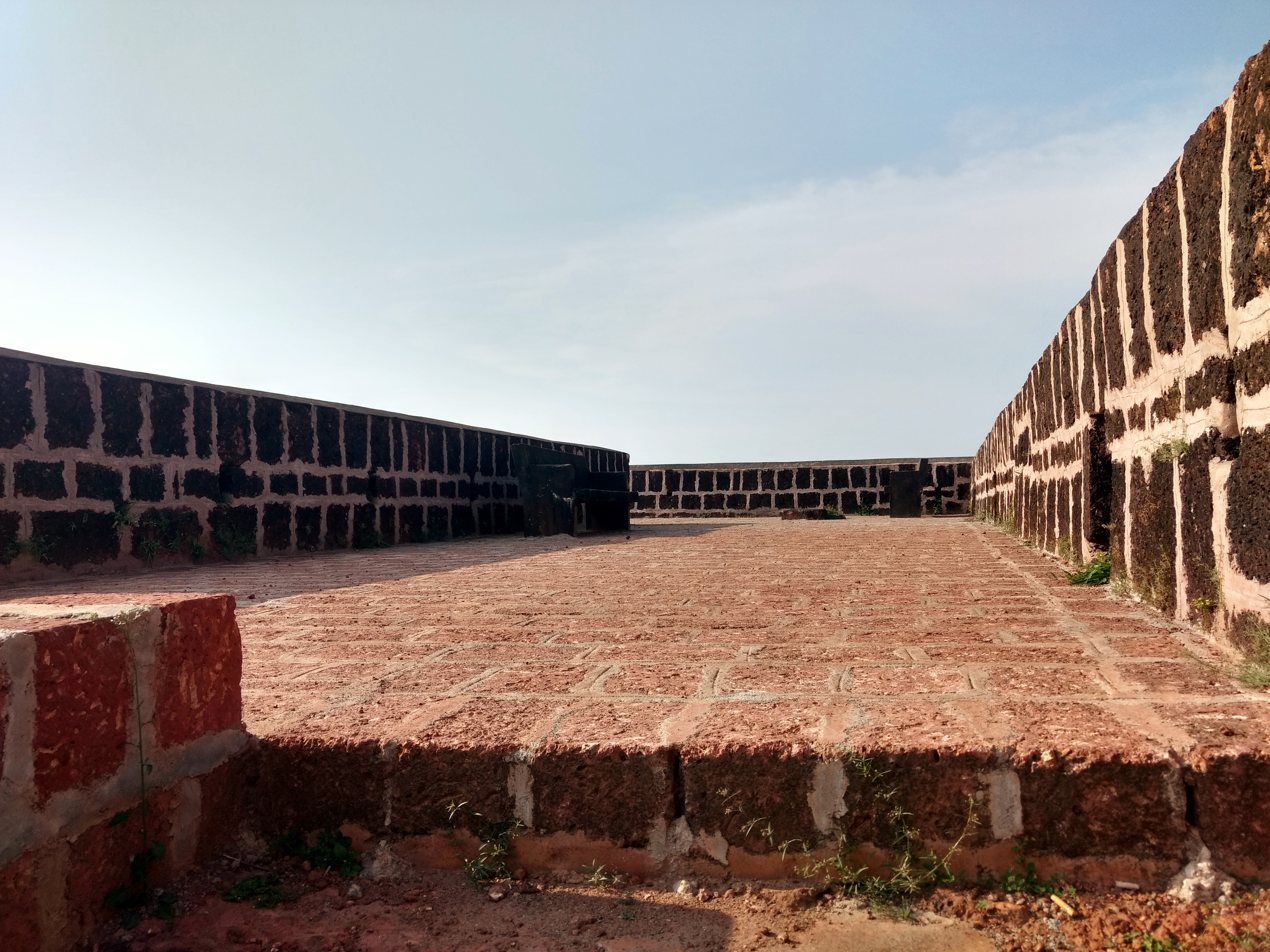
Chandragiri Fort renovation works 2019

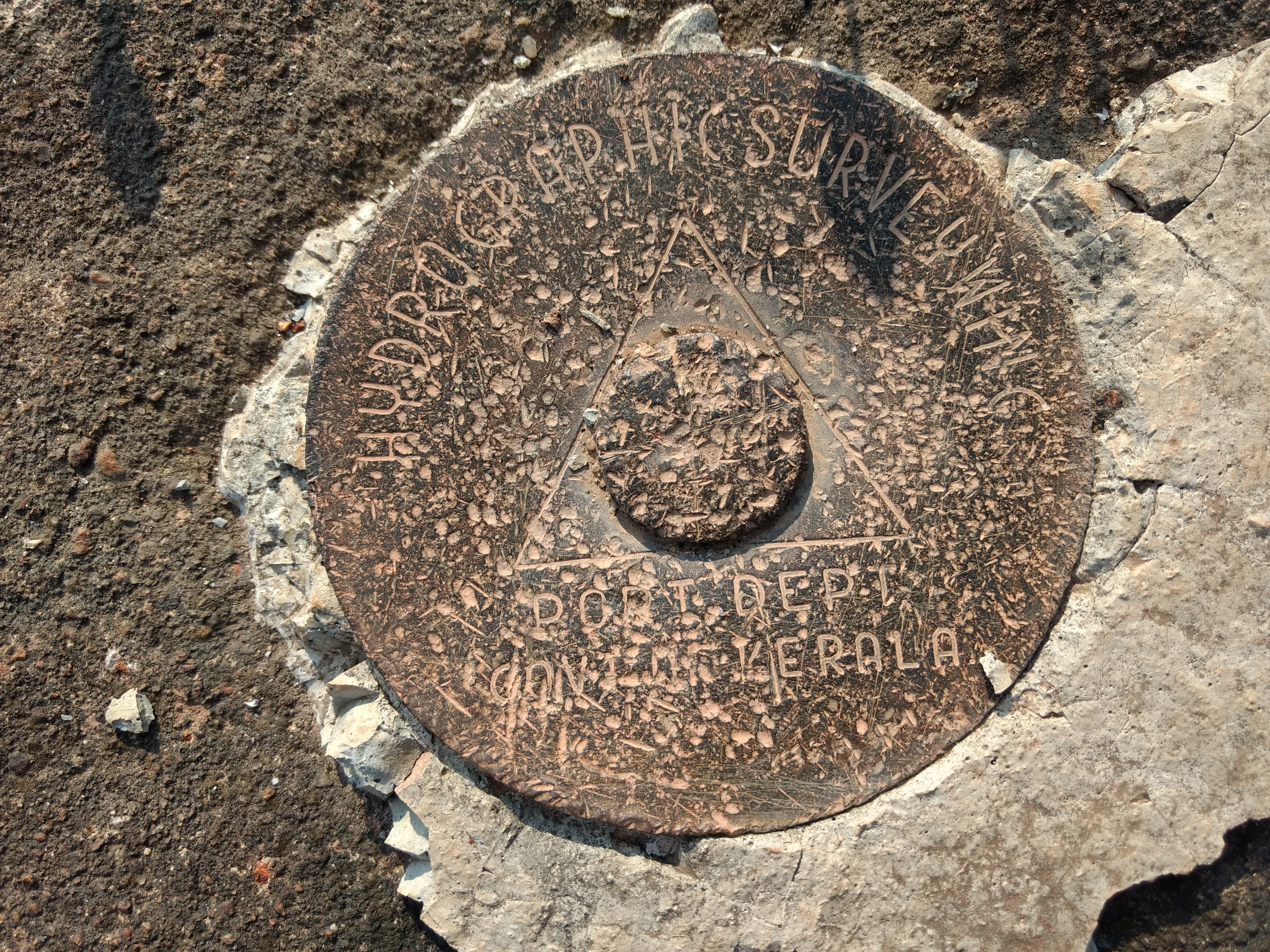
Chandragiri Fort renovation works 2019

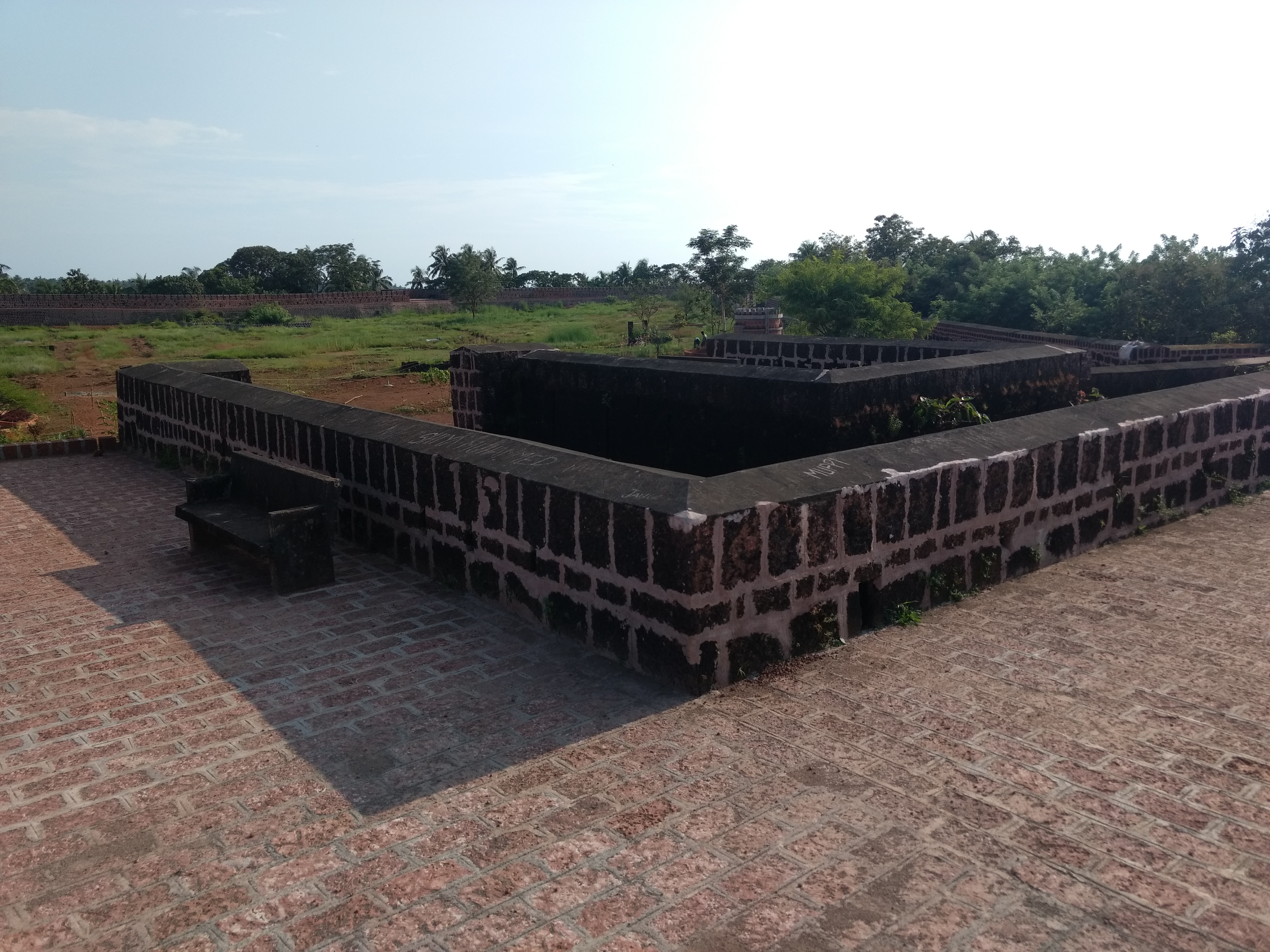
Chandragiri Fort renovation works 2019

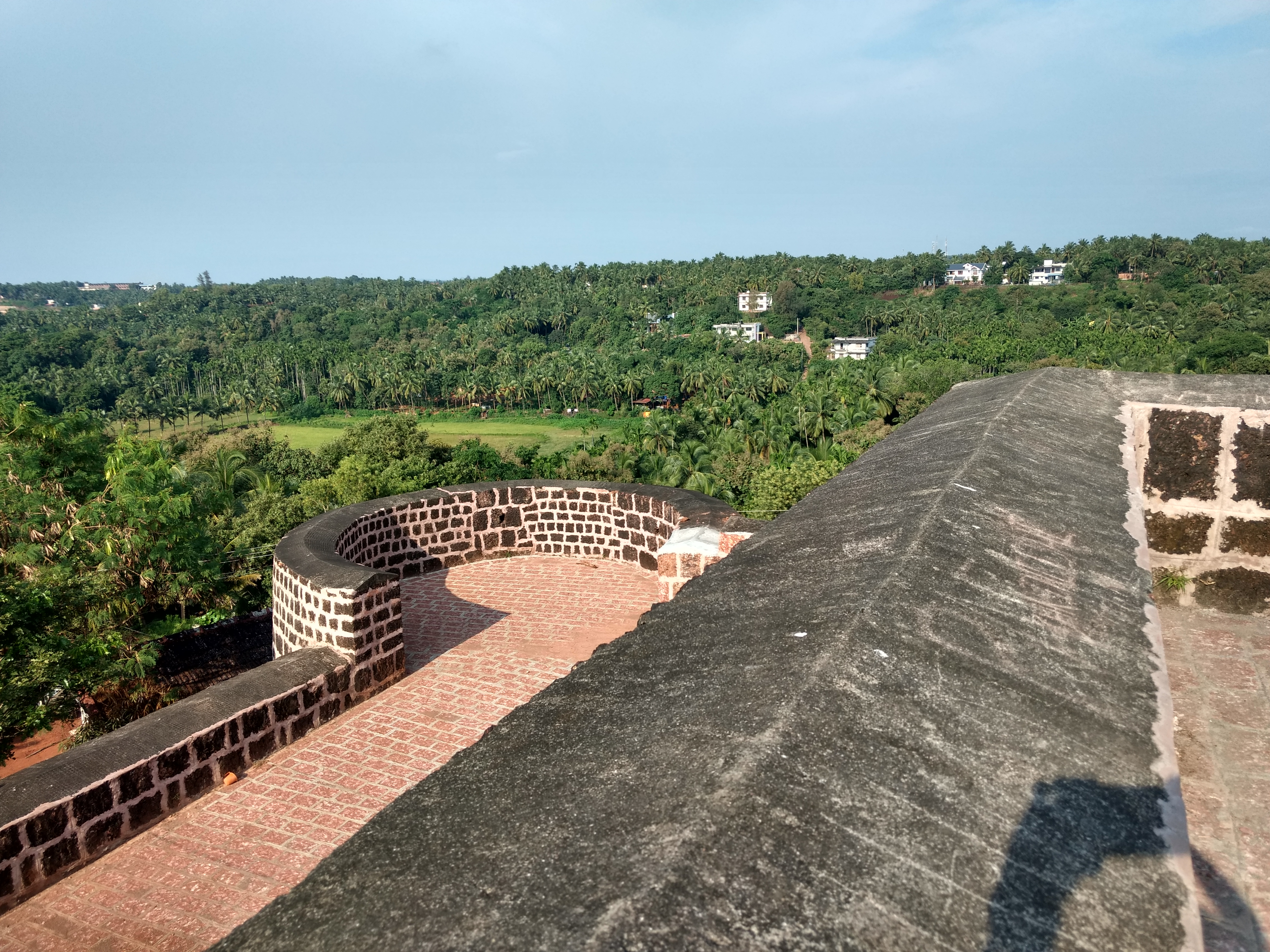
Chandragiri Fort renovation works 2019

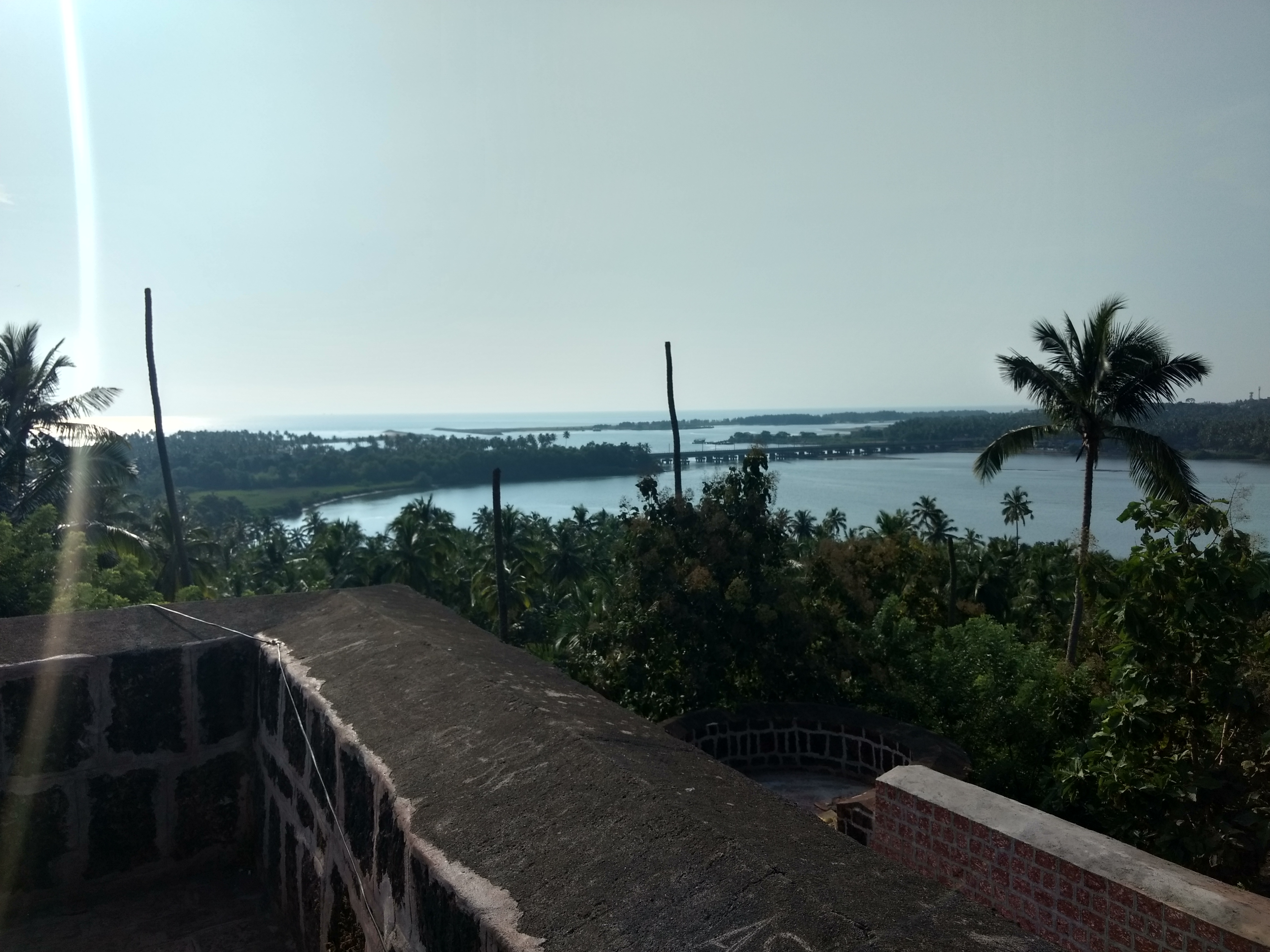
Chandragiri Fort renovation works 2019

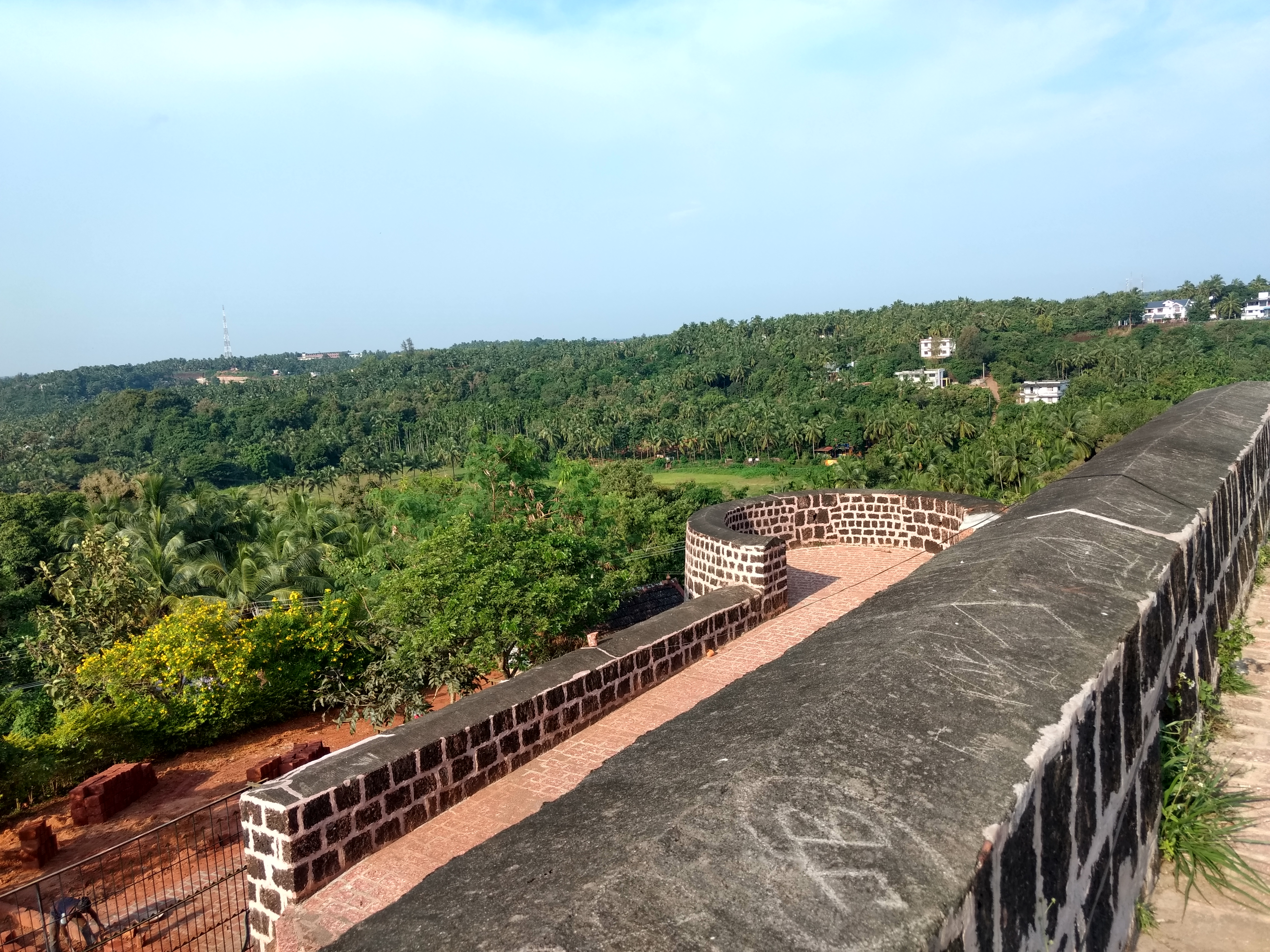
Chandragiri Fort

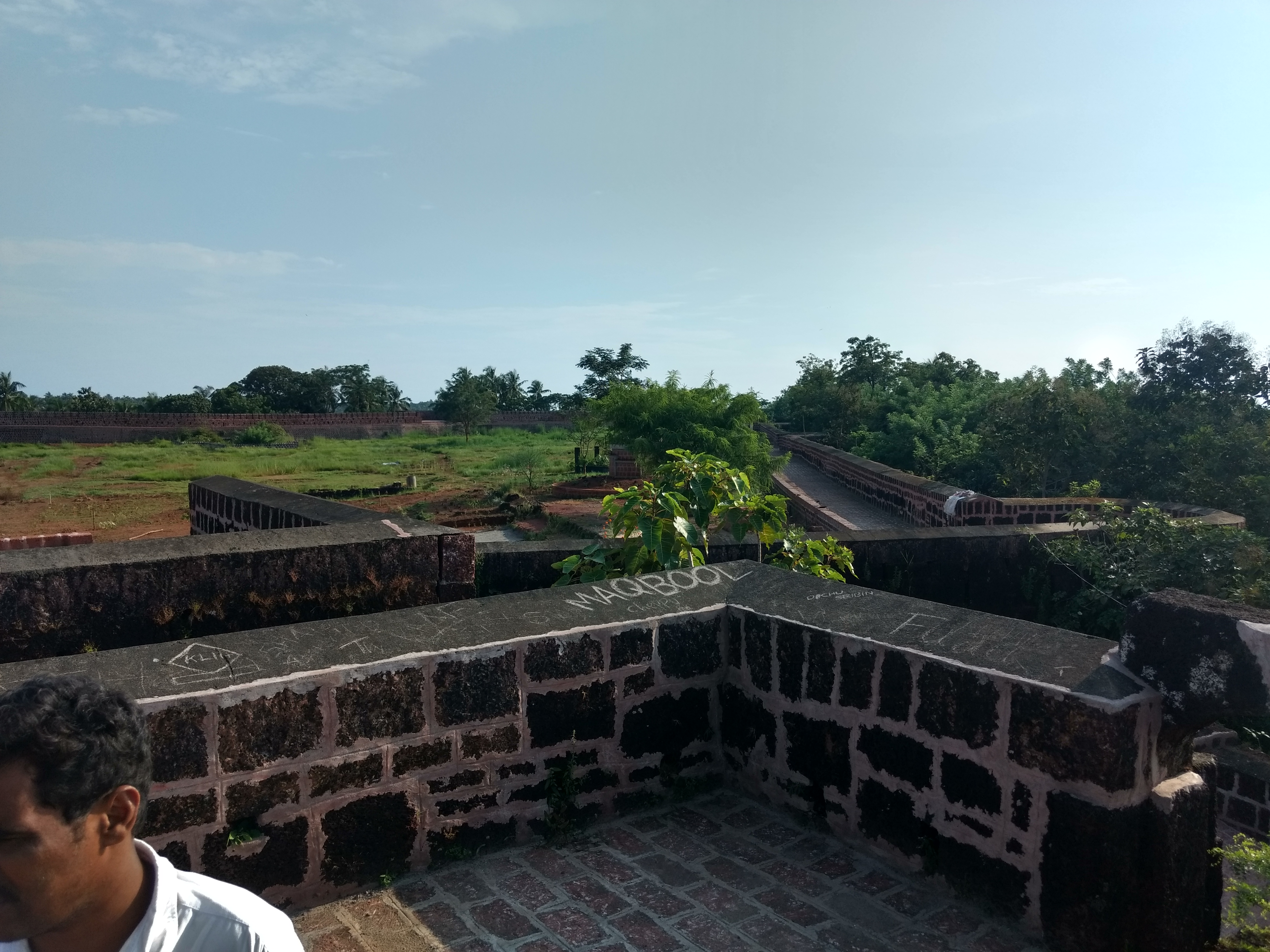
Chandragiri Fort

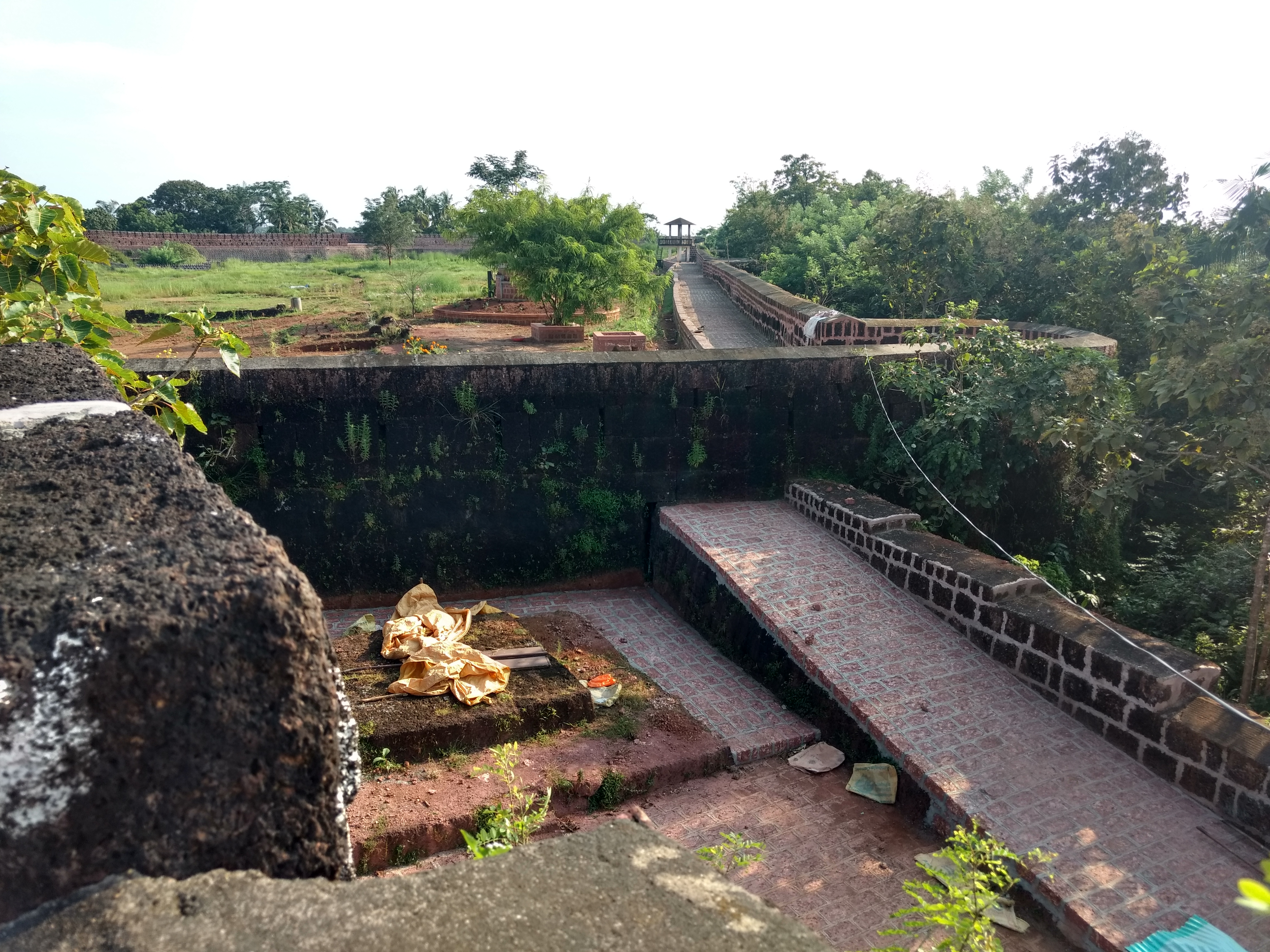
Chandragiri Fort

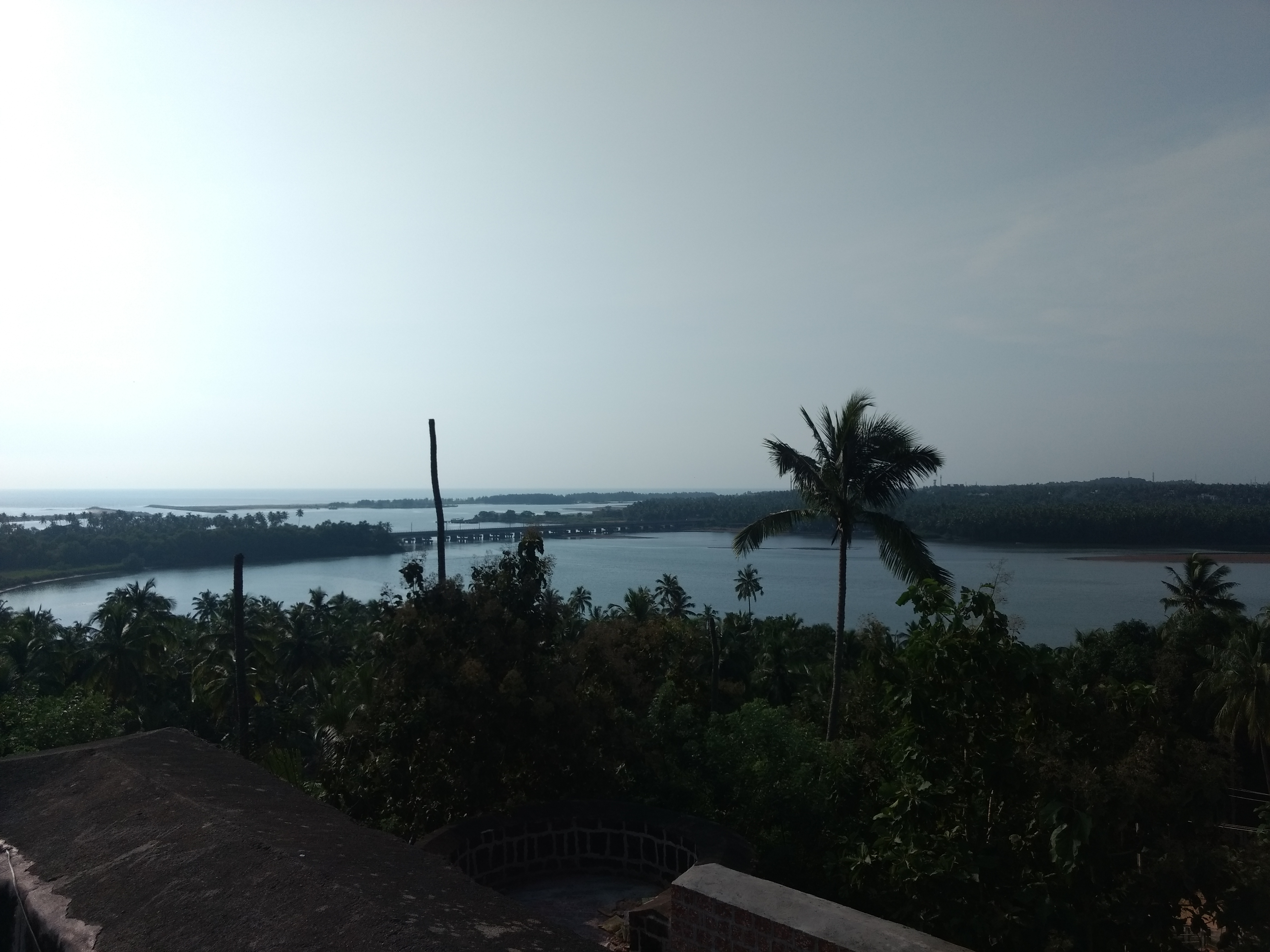
Chandragiri Fort

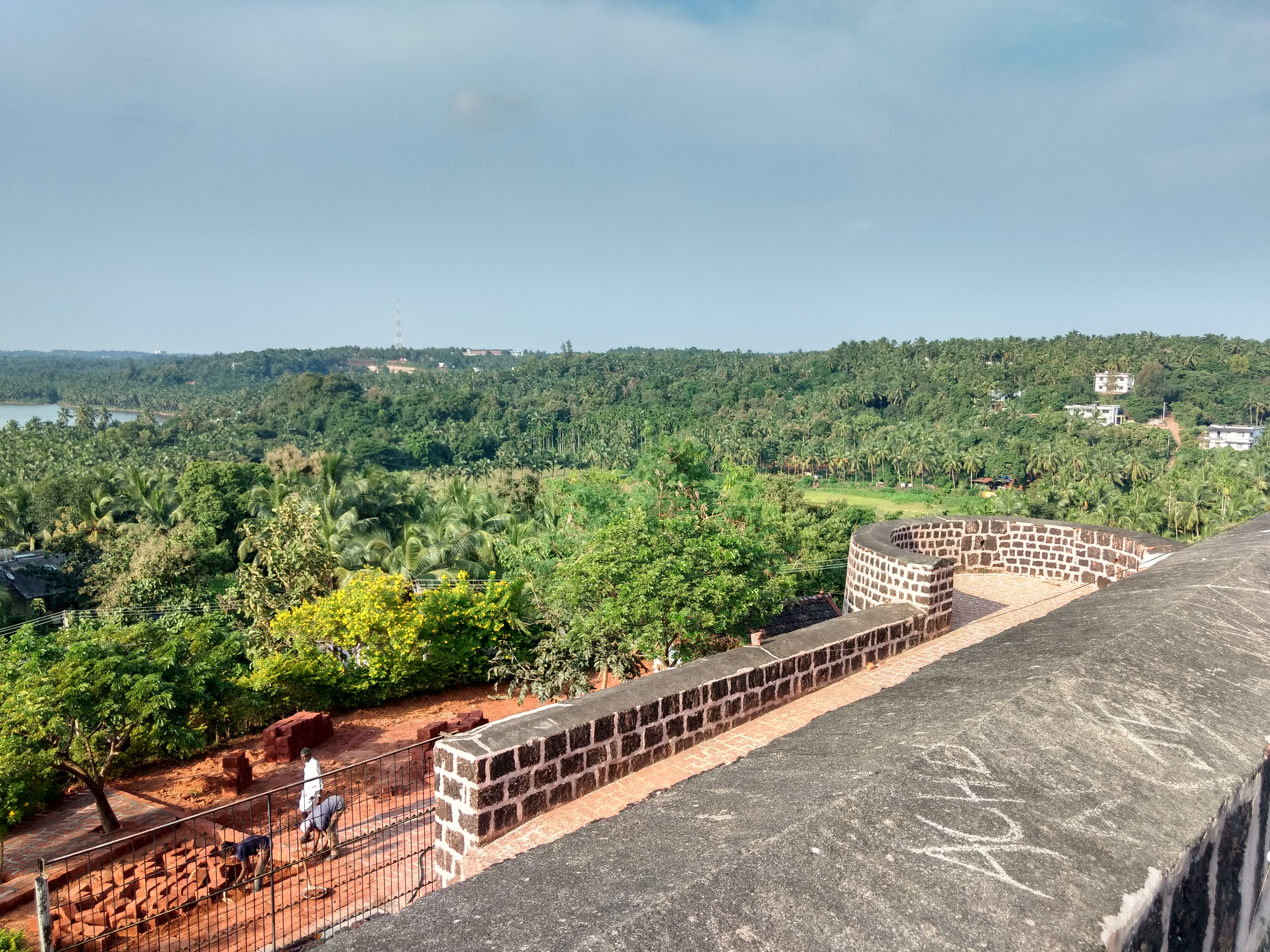
Chandragiri Fort renovation works 2019

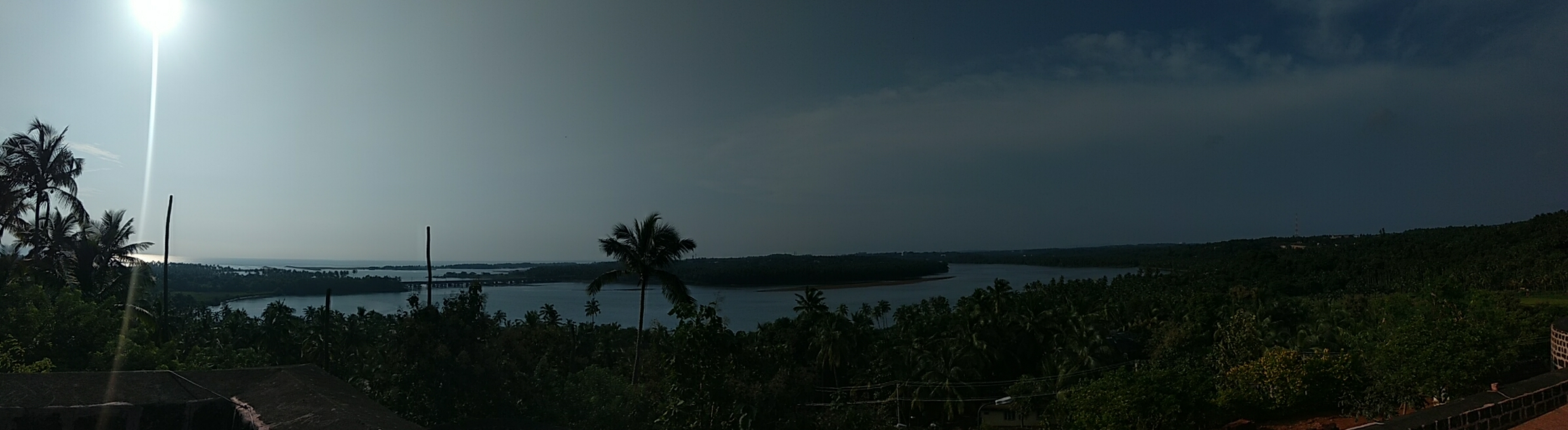
Chandragiri Fort

== See also ==
- Kannur Fort
- Thalassery Fort
- Bekal Fort
- Hosdurg fort
