= Abdullayev =

Abdullayev (Russian: Абдулла́ев) is a surname, found in Azerbaijan, Russia, and Central Asia. The feminine form is Abdullayeva (Russian: Абдулла́ева). It is slavicized patronymic surname derived from the given name Abdullah.

Variants are: Abdullaev, Abdulayev, and Abdulloev.

The name Abdullayev is used by the following people:

- Abdugani Abdullayev
- Abdusalom Abdullayev (born 1951), Tajikistani artist and cinematographer
- Aghakhan Abdullayev (1950–2016), Azerbaijani folk singer
- Aida Abdullayeva (1922–2009), Azerbaijani Soviet harpist
- Alasgar Abdullayev, birth name of Shakili Alasgar (1866–1929), Azerbaijani folk musician
- Araz Abdullayev (born 1992), Azerbaijani association football player
- Asgar Abdullayev (footballer) (born 1960), retired Azerbaijani association football player
- Chingiz Abdullayev (born 1959), Azerbaijani writer
- Dzhanet Abdullayeva, suicide bomber, one of the perpetrators of the 2010 Moscow Metro bombings
- Elshad Abdullayev (born 1961), Azerbaijani lawyer and university official
- Hanifa Abdullayev (1923–1991), Azerbaijani hematologist and health minister
- Hayat Abdullayeva (1912–2006), Azerbaijani sculptor
- Kamal Mehdi Abdullayev (born 1950), Azerbaijani philologist and university official
- Layes Abdullayeva (born 1991), Ethiopia-born Azerbaijani track and field athlete
- Leyla Abdullayeva (born 1981), Azerbaijani diplomat
- Lutfali Abdullayev (1914–1973), Azerbaijani actor
- Mikayil Abdullayev (1921–2002), Azerbaijani painter
- Nafisa Abdullaeva (born 1978), Uzbekistani lawyer and business coach
- Namiq Abdullayev (born 1972), Azerbaijani wrestler
- Pulat Abdullayev (born 1942), Russian diplomat
- Raʼno Abdullayeva (1935–2025), Uzbek historian
- Rashad Abdullayev (born 1981), Azerbaijani association football player
- Rovnag Abdullayev (born 1965), Azerbaijani businessman and politician
- Sabina Abdullayeva (born 1996), Azerbaijani paralympic judoka
- Supyan Abdullayev (1956–2011), Chechen politician
- Tamilla Abdullayeva (born 1943) Azerbaijani actress
- Zohra Abdullayeva (1952–2021), Azerbaijani singer

== See also ==
- Given names: Abdullah/Abdallah/Abdulah/etc., Abdollah, Abdala, Abdullahi, Abdulahi, Abdollahi, Abdullai, Abu Abdullah
- Surnames: Abdullaev, Abdulayev, Abdullayev, Abdulloev, Abdulov, Abdulin, Abdullin
