= Abdullin =

Abdullin (Russian: Абду́ллин; masculine) or Abdullina (Абду́ллина; feminine) is a Russian-language patronymic surname derived from the given name Abdulla. It is shared by the following people:

- Alexander Abdullin (born 1962), Ukrainian journalist and politician
- Alsu Abdullina, Russian footballer
- Arslan Abdullin, Russian Men's Greco-Roman bronze medal winner at the 2012 European Wrestling Championships
- Azat Abdullin, literary protégé of Maria Prilezhayeva, Russian/Soviet writer
- Denis Abdullin (born 1985), Russian ice hockey player
- Hesmat Abdullin, Uyghur writer
- Karina Abdullina, Kazakhstani singer and actress
- Olesya Abdullina, Russian draughts player at the 2008 World Mind Sports Games
- Rubin Abdullin, President of the Kazan Conservatory in Kazan, Russia

== See also ==
- Given names: Abdullah/Abdallah/Abdulah/etc., Abdollah, Abdala, Abdullahi, Abdulahi, Abdollahi, Abdullai, Abu Abdullah
- Surnames: Abdullaev, Abdulayev, Abdullayev, Abdulloev, Abdulov, Abdulin, Abdullin
- Abdulino, town in Orenburg Oblast, Russia
- Abdullino, several rural localities in the Republic of Bashkortostan, Russia
- Abdullaev, surname with a similar derivation
