= Abdullino =

Abdullino (Russian: Абдуллино) is the name of several rural localities in the Republic of Bashkortostan, Russia:

- Abdullino, Aurgazinsky District, Bashkortostan, a village in Semenkinsky Selsoviet of Aurgazinsky District
- Abdullino, Burayevsky District, Bashkortostan, a village in Kuzbayevsky Selsoviet of Burayevsky District
- Abdullino, Gafuriysky District, Bashkortostan, a village in Zilim-Karanovsky Selsoviet of Gafuriysky District
- Abdullino, Ilishevsky District, Bashkortostan, a village in Igmetovsky Selsoviet of Ilishevsky District
- Abdullino, Karaidelsky District, Bashkortostan, a village in Karayarsky Selsoviet of Karaidelsky District
- Abdullino, Karmaskalinsky District, Bashkortostan, a village in Starobabichevsky Selsoviet of Karmaskalinsky District
- Abdullino, Mechetlinsky District, Bashkortostan, a village in Abdullinsky Selsoviet of Mechetlinsky District
