= Abdollah =

Abdollah is a given name, a variant of Abdullah. Notable people with the name include:

== In arts and media ==
- Abdollah Eskandari (born 1945), Iranian make-up artist
- Abdollah Guivian (born 1960), Iranian writer and sociologist
- Abdollah Morvarid (1460/61–1516/17), Iranian writer, poet, calligrapher, and musician
- Abdollah Mirza Qajar (1850–1912), Iranian photographer

== In military and politics ==
- Abdollah Mirza Dara (1796–1846), Qajar prince
- Abdollah Khan Amin ol-Dowleh (1779–1847), politician in Qajar Iran
- Abdollah Entezam (1895–1983), Iranian diplomat
- Abdollah Hedayat (1899–1968), Iranian army general
- Abdollah Izadpanah, Iranian politician
- Abdollah Moazzami (died 1971), Iranian lawyer and politician
- Abdollah Momeni (born 1977), Iranian student leader and activist
- Abdollah Najafi (born 1951), Iranian general
- Abdollah Nouri (born 1950), Iranian reformist politician
- Abdollah Riazi (1905–1979), Iranian politician
- Abdollah Khan Ustajlu (died 1566/67), Iranian-Turkmen dignitary

== In sport ==
- Abdollah Chamangoli (born 1971), Iranian wrestler
- Abdollah Fatemi (born 1958), Iranian weightlifter
- Abdollah Hosseini (born 1990), Iranian footballer
- Abdollah Karami (born 1983), Iranian footballer
- Abdollah Khodabandeh (1936–2019), Iranian wrestler
- Abdollah Mojtabavi (1925–2012), Iranian wrestler
- Abdollah Movahed (1940–2026), Iranian wrestler
- Abdollah Nasseri (born 1992), Iranian footballer
- Abdollah Saedi (1942–1977), Iranian footballer
- Abdollah Veisi (born 1971), Iranian football player and manager

== In other fields ==
- Abdollah Javadi Amoli (born 1933), Iranian Marja
- Abdollah Guivian (born 1960), Iranian writer and sociologist
- Abdollah Jassbi (born 1944), Iranian academic
- Abdollah Ramezanzadeh (born 1954), Iranian academic
- Abdollah Shahbazi (born 1955), Iranian researcher

== See also ==
- Similar names: Abdullah/Abdallah/Abdulah/etc., Abdollah, Abdala, Abdullahi, Abdulahi, Abdollahi, Abdullai, Abu Abdullah
- Patronymic surnames: Abdullaev, Abdulayev, Abdullayev, Abdulloev, Abdulov, Abdulin, Abdullin
