= Abdulovo =

Abdulovo (Russian: Абдулово) is the name of several rural localities in Russia.

== Modern localities ==
- Abdulovo, Kuyurgazinsky District, Bashkortostan, a selo in Yakshimbetovsky Selsoviet of Kuyurgazinsky District in the Republic of Bashkortostan
- Abdulovo, Yermekeyevsky District, Bashkortostan, a selo in Staroturayevsky Selsoviet of Yermekeyevsky District in the Republic of Bashkortostan

== Alternative names ==
- Abdulovo, alternative name of Avdulovo-2, a village in Leontyevskoye Rural Settlement of Stupinsky District in Moscow Oblast; 55°5′N 38°16′E
- Abdulovo, alternative name of Avdulovo, a selo in Voskresensky Selsoviet of Dankovsky District in Lipetsk Oblast; 53°18′N 38°38′E

== See also ==
- Abdulino, a town in Orenburg Oblast, Russia
- Abdullino, several rural localities in the Republic of Bashkortostan, Russia
- Abdulov, Russian last name
