= Aboki =

Aboki is a Hausa word for Friend.

Aboki may also refer to:

- "Aboki" (song), by Nigerian rapper Ice Prince
- Jordan Aboki, French basketball player
- Ahmed Aboki Abdullahi, retired Brigadier General of the Nigerian army
- Kamal Aboki, Nigerian comedian and skit maker
- Yakubu Aboki Ochefu, Professor of African Economic History and Development Studies
