= Abdullahi =

- Gender: Male
- Language: Arabic

Origin
- Meaning: Servant of God

Other names
- Variant forms: Abdillahi, Abdallah, Abdellah, Abdollah, and many others
- Related names: Abdiel, Obadiah

Abdullahi // (also spelled Abdollahi and Abdillahi) is a male given name also common as a surname. It is derived the Arabic personal name Abdullah. (عبدالله), meaning “God’s servant.”

== Given name ==
- Abdullahi Abubakar (1936–2026), Nigerian Islamic cleric and humanitarian
- Abdullahi Ahmed Addow (born 1936), Somali politician
- Abdullahi Ahmed Irro (1937–2022), Somali military General
- Abdillahi Deria (died 1967), former Sultan of the Isaaq clan
- Abdullahi Afrah (1953–2008), Somali leader of UIC
- Abdullahi Yusuf Ahmed (1934–2012), President of Somalia
- Abdullahi Sudi Arale (born 1964), Somali Guantanamo detainee
- Abdullahi Mohammed (1939–2025), Nigerian major general
- Abdullahi Sadiq (died 1920), Ethiopian politician
- Abdullahi dan Fodio (1766–1828), Sultan of Gwandu and scholar
- Abdallahi ibn Muhammad (1846–1899), Mahdist Ansar ruler of Sudan
- Abdullahi Ibrahim (1939–2021), Nigerian politician
- Abdullahi Sheikh Ismail (1940–2021), Somali politician
- Abdullahi Issa (1922–1988), first prime minister of Somalia
- Abdullahi Sarki Mukhtar (born 1949), Nigerian retired Major-General
- Mohamed Abdullahi Mohamed (born 1962), Prime Minister of Somalia
- Abdullahi Aliyu Sumaila (1946–2003), Nigerian Administrator and Politician
- Abdullahi Ali Ahmed Waafow (died 2022), Somali general and politician

== Surname ==
- Amina Dika Abdullahi, Kenyan politician
- Ahmed Aboki Abdullahi, Nigerian army officer
- Hamza Abdullahi (1945–2019), Nigerian Air Force air marshal and governor
- Hassan Abdillahi, Somali journalist
- Mohamed Diriye Abdullahi (born 1958), Somali-Canadian scholar
- Nasrollah Abdollahi (born 1951), Iranian football player and coach
- Sadiq Abdullahi (born 1960), Nigerian tennis player
- Fariyal Abdullahi (born 1986), American chef
- Naser Abdollahi (1970–2006), Iranian singer

== See also ==
- Given names: Abdullah/Abdallah/Abdulah/etc., Abdollah, Abdala, Abdullahi, Abdulahi, Abdollahi, Abdullai, Abu Abdullah
- Surnames: Abdullaev, Abdulayev, Abdullayev, Abdulloev, Abdulov, Abdulin, Abdullin
