= Abdulin =

Abdulin (Russian: Абду́лин) is a masculine surname, commonly found in Azerbaijani, Russian, and Central Asian languages. It is slavicized patronymic surname derived from the given name Abdullah. Abdulina (Абду́лина) is the feminine surname counterpart. Notable people with the surname include:

- Denis Abdulin (born 1985), Russian professional ice hockey forward
- Mansur Abdulin (1923–2007), Russian memoirist
- Rinat Abdulin (born 1982), Kazakhstani association football player

== See also ==
- Given names: Abdullah/Abdallah/Abdulah/etc., Abdollah, Abdala, Abdullahi, Abdulahi, Abdollahi, Abdullai, Abu Abdullah
- Surnames: Abdullaev, Abdulayev, Abdullayev, Abdulloev, Abdulov, Abdulin, Abdullin
- Abdulino, a town in Orenburg Oblast, Russia
- Abdullino, several rural localities in the Republic of Bashkortostan, Russia
