= Klyuchevoy, Republic of Bashkortostan =

Klyuchevoy Ключевой
- Village
- Location within Bashkortostan Location within Russia
- Coordinates: 56°04′N 58°04′E
- Country: Russia
- Region: Bashkortostan
- District: Mechetlinsky District
- Time zone: UTC+5:00

Klyuchevoy (Russian: Ключевой) is a rural locality (a village) in Abdullinsky Selsoviet, Mechetlinsky District, Bashkortostan, Russia. The population was 180 in 2010. There are four streets.

== Geography ==
Klyuchevoy is located 23 km northwest of Bolsheustyikinskoye (the district's administrative centre) by road. Abdullino is the nearest rural locality.
