= Suleymanovo, Mechetlinsky District, Republic of Bashkortostan =

Suleymanovo Сулейманово
- Village
- Location within Bashkortostan Location within Russia
- Coordinates: 55°47′N 58°20′E
- Country: Russia
- Region: Bashkortostan
- District: Mechetlinsky District
- Time zone: UTC+5:00

Suleymanovo (Russian: Сулейманово; Bashkir: Һөләймән, Höläymän) is a rural locality (a village) in Lemez-Tamaksky Selsoviet, Mechetlinsky District, Bashkortostan, Russia. The population was 472 as of 2010. There are 7 streets.

== Geography ==
Suleymanovo is located 27 km south of Bolsheustyikinskoye (the district's administrative centre) by road. Kutushevo is the nearest rural locality.
