= Sabanakovo =

Sabanakovo Сабанаково
- Village
- Location within Bashkortostan Location within Russia
- Coordinates: 55°52′N 58°15′E
- Country: Russia
- Region: Bashkortostan
- District: Mechetlinsky District
- Time zone: UTC+5:00

Sabanakovo (Russian: Сабанаково; Bashkir: Һабанаҡ, Habanaq) is a rural locality (a village) in Lemez-Tamaksky Selsoviet, Mechetlinsky District, Bashkortostan, Russia. The population was 391 as of 2010. There are 5 streets.

== Geography ==
Sabanakovois located 14 km south of Bolsheustyikinskoye (the district's administrative centre) by road. Ayupovo is the nearest rural locality.
