= Abdulov =

Abdulov (Russian: Абду́лов; masculine) or Abdulova (Абду́лова; feminine) is a Russian, Azerbaijani, and Central Asian surname. It is slavicized patronymic surname derived from the given name Abdullah. . Notable people with the surname include:

- Aleksandr Abdulov (1953–2008), Russian actor
- Darya Abdulova, Russian pair skater at the 2009 Russian Figure Skating Championships
- Ilgar Abdulov (born 1981), Azerbaijani Greco-Roman wrestler
- Ivan Abdulov (1922–1944), Russian sniper
- Olim Abdulov, journalist killed in Tajikistan
- Osip Abdulov (1900–1953), Russian actor
- Samir Abdulov (born 1987), Azerbaijani footballer
- Vsevolod Abdulov, actor from The Trust That Has Burst, 1984 Soviet miniseries

== See also ==
- Given names: Abdullah/Abdallah/Abdulah/etc., Abdollah, Abdala, Abdullahi, Abdulahi, Abdollahi, Abdullai, Abu Abdullah
- Surnames: Abdullaev, Abdulayev, Abdullayev, Abdulloev, Abdulov, Abdulin, Abdullin
- Abdulovo, several rural localities in Russia
