= Abdullai =

Abdullai is a surname. Notable people with the surname include:

- Abubakar Abdullai Ahmad (born 1968), Nigerian politician
- Edward Abdullai Mobalaji Olatunji Afo Oshodi (born 1992), English semi-professional footballer
- Jalal Abdullai (born 2005), Ghanaian footballer
- Zakaria Abdullai (born 1989), Ghanaian footballer

== See also ==
- Abdullah/Abdallah/Abdulah/etc., Abdollah, Abdala, Abdullahi, Abdulahi, Abdollahi, Abdullai, Abu Abdullah
- Patronymic surnames: Abdullaev, Abdulayev, Abdullayev, Abdulloev, Abdulov, Abdulin, Abdullin
