= Burgadzhino =

Burgadzhino Бургаджино
- Village
- Location within Bashkortostan Location within Russia
- Coordinates: 55°57′N 57°54′E
- Country: Russia
- Region: Bashkortostan
- District: Mechetlinsky District
- Time zone: UTC+5:00

Burgadzhino (Russian: Бургаджино; Bashkir: Борғатъя, Borğatya) is a rural locality (a village) in Alegazovsky Selsoviet, Mechetlinsky District, Bashkortostan, Russia. The population was 249 as of 2010. There are 7 streets.

== Geography ==
Burgadzhino is located 27 km west of Bolsheustyikinskoye (the district's administrative centre) by road. Melekasovo is the nearest rural locality.
