= Alegazovo =

Alegazovo Алегазово
- Selo
- Location within Bashkortostan Location within Russia
- Coordinates: 55°56′N 58°07′E
- Country: Russia
- Region: Bashkortostan
- District: Mechetlinsky District
- Time zone: UTC+5:00

Alegazovo (Russian: Алегазово; Bashkir: Әләгәҙ, Älägäź) is a rural locality (a selo) and the administrative centre of Alegazovsky Selsoviet, Mechetlinsky District, Bashkortostan, Russia. The population was 1,341 as of 2010. There are 18 streets.

== Geography ==
Alegazovo is located 13 km west of Bolsheustyikinskoye (the district's administrative centre) by road. Malokyzylbayevo is the nearest rural locality.
