= Salzigutovo, Mechetlinsky District, Republic of Bashkortostan =

Salzigutovo Сальзигутово
- Village
- Location within Bashkortostan Location within Russia
- Coordinates: 55°54′N 58°13′E
- Country: Russia
- Region: Bashkortostan
- District: Mechetlinsky District
- Time zone: UTC+5:00

Salzigutovo (Russian: Сальзигутово; Bashkir: Салйоғот, Salyoğot) is a rural locality (a village) in Bolsheustyikinsky Selsoviet, Mechetlinsky District, Bashkortostan, Russia. The population was 266 as of 2010. There are 9 streets.

== Geography ==
Salzigutovo is located 6 km southwest of Bolsheustyikinskoye (the district's administrative centre) by road. Bolsheustyikinskoye is the nearest rural locality.
