= Nizhneye Tukbayevo =

Nizhneye Tukbayevo Нижнее Тукбаево
- Village
- Location within Bashkortostan Location within Russia
- Coordinates: 55°41′N 58°11′E
- Country: Russia
- Region: Bashkortostan
- District: Mechetlinsky District
- Time zone: UTC+5:00

Nizhneye Tukbayevo (Russian: Нижнее Тукбаево; Bashkir: Түбәнге Туҡбай, Tübänge Tuqbay) is a rural locality (a village) in Duvan-Mechetlinsky Selsoviet, Mechetlinsky District, Bashkortostan, Russia. The population was 227 as of 2010. There are 6 streets.

== Geography ==
Nizhneye Tukbayevo is located 44 km south of Bolsheustyikinskoye (the district's administrative centre) by road. Buranchino is the nearest rural locality.
