= Burtakovka =

Burtakovka Буртаковка
- Village
- Location within Bashkortostan Location within Russia
- Coordinates: 55°53′N 58°06′E
- Country: Russia
- Region: Bashkortostan
- District: Mechetlinsky District
- Time zone: UTC+5:00

Burtakovka (Russian: Буртаковка) is a rural locality (a village) in Alegazovsky Selsoviet, Mechetlinsky District, Bashkortostan, Russia. The population was 248 as of 2010. There are 5 streets.

== Geography ==
Burtakovka is located 17 km southwest of Bolsheustyikinskoye (the district's administrative centre) by road. Alegazovo is the nearest rural locality.
