= Azikeyevo, Mechetlinsky District, Republic of Bashkortostan =

Azikeyevo Азикеево
- Village
- Location within Bashkortostan Location within Russia
- Coordinates: 56°02′N 58°15′E
- Country: Russia
- Region: Bashkortostan
- District: Mechetlinsky District
- Time zone: UTC+5:00

Azikeyevo (Russian: Азикеево; Bashkir: Әжекәй, Äjekäy) is a rural locality (a village) in Bolsheustyikinsky Selsoviet, Mechetlinsky District, Bashkortostan, Russia. The population was 684 as of 2010. There are 15 streets.

== Geography ==
Azikeyevo is located 14 km north of Bolsheustyikinskoye (the district's administrative centre) by road. Srednyaya Oka is the nearest rural locality.
