= Ay, Republic of Bashkortostan =

Ay Ай
- Village
- Location within Bashkortostan Location within Russia
- Coordinates: 55°58′N 58°11′E
- Country: Russia
- Region: Bashkortostan
- District: Mechetlinsky District
- Time zone: UTC+5:00

Ay (Russian: Ай; Bashkir: Әй, Äy) is a rural locality (a village) in Alegazovsky Selsoviet, Mechetlinsky District, Bashkortostan, Russia. The population was 33 as of 2010. There is 1 street.

== Geography ==
Ay is located 12 km northwest of Bolsheustyikinskoye (the district's administrative centre) by road. Alegazovo is the nearest rural locality.
