= Ayupovo =

Ayupovo Аюпово
- Village
- Location within Bashkortostan Location within Russia
- Coordinates: 55°51′N 58°18′E
- Country: Russia
- Region: Bashkortostan
- District: Mechetlinsky District
- Time zone: UTC+5:00

Ayupovo (Russian: Аюпово; Bashkir: Айып, Ayıp) is a rural locality (a village) in Yunusovsky Selsoviet, Mechetlinsky District, Bashkortostan, Russia. The population was 342 in total as of 2010. There are 6 streets.

== Geography ==
Ayupovo is located at 13 km south of Bolsheustyikinskoye (the district's administrative centre) by road. Sabanakovo is the nearest rural locality.
