= Kutashevo =

Kutashevo Кутушево
- Village
- Location within Bashkortostan Location within Russia
- Coordinates: 55°49′N 58°17′E
- Country: Russia
- Region: Bashkortostan
- District: Mechetlinsky District
- Time zone: UTC+5:00

Kutashevo (Russian: Кутушево; Bashkir: Ҡотош, Qotoş) is a rural locality (a village) in Lemez-Tamaksky Selsoviet, Mechetlinsky District, Bashkortostan, Russia. The population was 361 as of 2010. There are 3 streets.

== Geography ==
Kutashevo is located 21 km south of Bolsheustyikinskoye (the district's administrative centre) by road. Lemez-Tamak is the nearest rural locality.
