= Buranchino =

Buranchino Буранчино
- Village
- Location within Bashkortostan Location within Russia
- Coordinates: 55°40′N 58°14′E
- Country: Russia
- Region: Bashkortostan
- District: Mechetlinsky District
- Time zone: UTC+5:00

Buranchino (Russian: Буранчино; Bashkir: Бурансы, Buransı) is a rural locality (a village) in Duvan-Mechetlinsky Selsoviet, Mechetlinsky District, Bashkortostan, Russia. The population was 191 as of 2010. There are 4 streets.

== Geography ==
Buranchino is located 40 km south of Bolsheustyikinskoye (the district's administrative centre) by road. Duvan-Mechetlino and Nizhneye Tukbayevo are the nearest rural localities.
