= Melekasovo =

Melekasovo Мелекасово
- Village
- Location within Bashkortostan Location within Russia
- Coordinates: 55°55′N 57°58′E
- Country: Russia
- Region: Bashkortostan
- District: Mechetlinsky District

Area
  - Total: 8.76 km^{2} (3.38 sq mi)
- Time zone: UTC+5:00

Melekasovo (Russian: Мелекасово; Bashkir: Мәләкәҫ, Mäläkäś) is a rural locality (a village) in Alegazovsky Selsoviet, Mechetlinsky District, Bashkortostan, Russia. The population was 259 as of 2010. There are 3 streets.

== Geography ==
Melekasovo is located 21 km west of Bolsheustyikinskoye (the district's administrative centre) by road. Salyevka is the nearest rural locality.
