= Abdullaev =

Abdullaev (Russian: Абдуллаев) is a surname, commonly found in Russia, Caucasia, and Central Asia. The female counterpart surname is Abdullaeva. It is a Russian-language patronymic surname derived from the given name Abdulla. Variants are Abdulayev and Abdullayev.

Notable people with the surname include:

- Djamilya Abdullaeva (born 1984), Uzbek model and actress
- Gulomjon Abdullaev (born 1998), Uzbekistani freestyle wrestler
- Ismail Abdullaiev (born 1966), former KVN DPI team member and pro-Russian television director from Ukraine
- Mahammatkodir Abdullaev (born 1973), Uzbekistani boxer
- Muhammad Abdullaev (born 1973), Uzbekistani boxer
- Muminjon Abdullaev (born 1989), Uzbekistani Greco-Roman wrestler
- Nafisa Abdullaeva (born 1978), Uzbek lawyer, business scholar, textbook author, writer, and poet
- Nasiba Abdullaeva, Soviet and Uzbek pop singer
- Nazir Abdullaev (born 1991), Russian Greco-Roman wrestler
- Rihsitilla Abdullaev (born 1978), Uzbek actor
- Rustam Abdullaev (born 1971), Uzbekistani association football player and coach
- Umida Abdullaeva (born 1997), Uzbekistani taekwondo practitioner
- Sadriddin Abdullaev (born 1986), Uzbekistani association football player
- Shamshad Abdullaev (born 1957), Soviet-Uzbek poet and writer
- Shirin Abdullaeva (2005–2025), singer, model and actress
- Shokhrullo Abdullaev, Uzbek singer, composer, actor
- Zaur Abdullaev (born 1994), Russian professional boxer

== See also ==
- Given names: Abdullah/Abdallah/Abdulah/etc., Abdollah, Abdala, Abdullahi, Abdulahi, Abdollahi, Abdullai, Abu Abdullah
- Surnames: Abdullaev, Abdulayev, Abdullayev, Abdulloev, Abdulov, Abdulin, Abdullin
