= Yulayevo =

Yulayevo Юлаево
- Village
- Location within Bashkortostan Location within Russia
- Coordinates: 56°08′N 58°33′E
- Country: Russia
- Region: Bashkortostan
- District: Mechetlinsky District
- Time zone: UTC+5:00

Yulayevo (Russian: Юлаево; Bashkir: Юлай, Yulay) is a rural locality (a village) in Kurgatovsky Selsoviet, Mechetlinsky District, Bashkortostan, Russia. The population was 158 as of 2010, tatars There are 3 streets.

== Geography ==
Yulayevo is located 32 km northeast of Bolsheustyikinskoye (the district's administrative centre) by road. Kurgatovo is the nearest rural locality.
