= Ishalino =

Ishalino Ишалино
- Village
- Location within Bashkortostan Location within Russia
- Coordinates: 55°59′N 58°32′E
- Country: Russia
- Region: Bashkortostan
- District: Mechetlinsky District
- Time zone: UTC+5:00

Ishalino (Russian: Ишалино; Bashkir: Ишәле, İşäle) is a rural locality (a village) in Rostovsky Selsoviet, Mechetlinsky District, Bashkortostan, Russia. The population was 223 as of 2010. There are 2 streets.

== Geography ==
Ishalino is located 24 km northeast of Bolsheustyikinskoye (the district's administrative centre) by road. Telyashevo is the nearest rural locality.
