= Novoyaushevo =

Novoyaushevo Новояушево
- Village
- Location within Bashkortostan Location within Russia
- Coordinates: 55°42′N 58°22′E
- Country: Russia
- Region: Bashkortostan
- District: Mechetlinsky District
- Time zone: UTC+5:00

Novoyaushevo (Russian: Новояушево; Bashkir: Яңы Яуыш, Yañı Yawış) is a rural locality (a village) and the administrative centre of Novoyaushevsky Selsoviet, Mechetlinsky District, Bashkortostan, Russia. The population was 550 as of 2010. There are 8 streets.

== Geography ==
Novoyaushevo is located 35 km south of Bolsheustyikinskoye (the district's administrative centre) by road. Staromeshcherovo is the nearest rural locality.
