= Telyashevo, Mechetlinsky District, Republic of Bashkortostan =

Telyashevo Теляшево
- Village
- Location within Bashkortostan Location within Russia
- Coordinates: 56°02′N 58°36′E
- Country: Russia
- Region: Bashkortostan
- District: Mechetlinsky District
- Time zone: UTC+5:00

Telyashevo (Russian: Теляшево; Bashkir: Теләш, Teläş) is a rural locality (a village) and the administrative centre of Rostovsky Selsoviet, Mechetlinsky District, Bashkortostan, Russia. The population was 479 as of 2010. There are 3 streets.

== Geography ==
Telyashevo is located 29 km northeast of Bolsheustyikinskoye (the district's administrative centre) by road. Takino is the nearest rural locality.
