= Karanayevo =

Karanayevo Каранаево
- Village
- Location within Bashkortostan Location within Russia
- Coordinates: 55°38′N 58°17′E
- Country: Russia
- Region: Bashkortostan
- District: Mechetlinsky District
- Time zone: UTC+5:00

Karanayevo (Russian: Каранаево; Bashkir: Ҡаранай, Qaranay) is a rural locality (a village) located in the Duvan-Mechetlinsky Selsoviet, Mechetlinsky District, Bashkortostan, Russia. As of the 2010 census, the population was 170. The village has 4 streets.

== Geography ==
Karanayevo is located 41 km south of Bolsheustyikinskoye (the district's administrative centre) by road. Duvan-Mechetlino is the nearest rural locality.
