= Yunusovo, Mechetlinsky District, Republic of Bashkortostan =

Yunusovo Юнусово
- Village
- Location within Bashkortostan Location within Russia
- Coordinates: 55°49′N 58°23′E
- Country: Russia
- Region: Bashkortostan
- District: Mechetlinsky District
- Time zone: UTC+5:00

Yunusovo (Russian: Юнусово; Bashkir: Йонос, Yonos) is a rural locality (a village) and the administrative centre of Yunusovsky Selsoviet, Mechetlinsky District, Bashkortostan, Russia. The population was 457 as of 2010. There are 10 streets.

== Geography ==
Yunusovo is located 22 km southeast of Bolsheustyikinskoye (the district's administrative centre) by road. Timiryakovo is the nearest rural locality.
