= IIO =

IIO or Iio may refer to:

- iiO, an American dance music group
- Iio (surname), in Japan
- Imperial Inspectorate Organization, or its successor the Islamic Inspectorate Organization in Iran
- Independent Investigations Office, a police oversight agency in British Columbia, Canada
- Italian Instabile Orchestra, an experimental big band
- Information Integration Officers, of the U.S. Air Force; see Aircrew Badge
- Diminished supertonic triad (ii^{o}), a borrowed chord
- Linux Industrial I/O subsystem

== See also ==
- I2O (Intelligent Input/Output), a defunct computer input/output (I/O) specification
