= Azangulovo =

Azangulovo Азангулово
- Village
- Location within Bashkortostan Location within Russia
- Coordinates: 55°44′N 58°26′E
- Country: Russia
- Region: Bashkortostan
- District: Mechetlinsky District
- Time zone: UTC+5:00

Azangulovo (Russian: Азангулово; Bashkir: Аҙанғол, Aźanğol) is a rural locality (a village) in Novomeshcherovsky Selsoviet, Mechetlinsky District, Bashkortostan, Russia. The population was 326 as of 2010. There are 4 streets.

== Geography ==
Azangulovo is located 33 km southeast of Bolsheustyikinskoye (the district's administrative centre) by road. Taishevo is the nearest rural locality.
