= Yasinovo =

Yasinovo Ясиново
- Village
- Location within Bashkortostan Location within Russia
- Coordinates: 55°41′N 58°23′E
- Country: Russia
- Region: Bashkortostan
- District: Mechetlinsky District
- Time zone: UTC+5:00

Yasinovo (Russian: Ясиново; Bashkir: Ясин, Yasin) is a rural locality (a village) in Novomeshcherovsky Selsoviet, Mechetlinsky District, Bashkortostan, Russia. The population was 164 as of 2010. There is 1 street.

== Geography ==
Yasinovo is located 44 km south of Bolsheustyikinskoye (the district's administrative centre) by road. Novomereshchevo is the nearest rural locality.
