= Novomeshcherovo =

Novomeshcherovo Новомещерово
- Village
- Location within Bashkortostan Location within Russia
- Coordinates: 55°42′N 58°24′E
- Country: Russia
- Region: Bashkortostan
- District: Mechetlinsky District
- Time zone: UTC+5:00

Novomeshcherovo (Russian: Новомещерово; Bashkir: Яңы Мишәр, Yañı Mişär) is a rural locality (a village) and the administrative centre of Novomeshcherovsky Selsoviet, Mechetlinsky District, Bashkortostan, Russia. The population was 526 as of 2010. There are 6 streets.

== Geography ==
Novomeshcherovo is located 50 km south of Bolsheustyikinskoye (the district's administrative centre) by road. Yasinovo is the nearest rural locality.
