= Taishevo, Mechetlinsky District, Republic of Bashkortostan =

Taishevo Таишево
- Village
- Location within Bashkortostan Location within Russia
- Coordinates: 55°47′N 58°27′E
- Country: Russia
- Region: Bashkortostan
- District: Mechetlinsky District
- Time zone: UTC+5:00

Taishevo (Russian: Таишево; Bashkir: Тайыш, Tayış) is a rural locality (a village) in Yunusovsky Selsoviet, Mechetlinsky District, Bashkortostan, Russia. The population was 343 as of 2010. There are 5 streets.

== Geography ==
Taishevo is located 33 km southeast of Bolsheustyikinskoye (the district's administrative centre) by road. Azangulovo is the nearest rural locality.
