= Abdrakhimovo =

Abdrakhimovo Абдрахимово Әбдрәхим Ӓbdräxim
- Village
- Location within Bashkortostan Location within Russia
- Coordinates: 55°49′N 58°19′E
- Country: Russia
- Region: Bashkortostan
- District: Mechetlinsky District
- Time zone: [[UTC+5:00]]

Abdrakhimovo (Russian: Абдрахимово; Bashkir: Әбдрәхим, Ӓbdräxim) is a rural locality (a village) in Yunusovsky Selsoviet of Mechetlinsky District, Bashkortostan, Russia. The population was 324 as of 2010. There are 5 streets.

== Geography ==
Abdrakhimovo is located 17 km south of Bolsheustyikinskoye (the district's administrative centre) by road. Lemez-Tamak is the nearest rural locality.
