= Novomuslyumovo =

Novomuslyumovo Новомуслюмово
- Selo
- Location within Bashkortostan Location within Russia
- Coordinates: 55°56′N 58°28′E
- Country: Russia
- Region: Bashkortostan
- District: Mechetlinsky District
- Time zone: UTC+5:00

Novomuslyumovo (Russian: Новомуслюмово; Bashkir: Яңы Мөслим, Yañı Möslim) is a rural locality (a selo) in Bolsheustyikinsky Selsoviet, Mechetlinsky District, Bashkortostan, Russia. The population was 1,063 as of 2010. There are 7 streets.

== Geography ==
Novomuslyumovo is located 15 km east of Bolsheustyikinskoye (the district's administrative centre) by road. Yemashi is the nearest rural locality.
