= Bolshekyzylbayevo =

Bolshekyzylbayevo Большекызылбаево
- Village
- Location within Bashkortostan Location within Russia
- Coordinates: 55°57′N 58°04′E
- Country: Russia
- Region: Bashkortostan
- District: Mechetlinsky District
- Time zone: UTC+5:00

Bolshekyzylbayevo (Russian: Большекызылбаево; Bashkir: Оло Ҡыҙылбай, Olo Qıźılbay) is a rural locality (a village) in Alegazovsky Selsoviet, Mechetlinsky District, Bashkortostan, Russia. The population was 451 as of 2010. There are 9 streets.

== Geography ==
Bolshekyzylbayevo is located 17 km west Bolsheustyikinskoye (the district's administrative centre) by road. Sosnovka is the nearest rural locality.
