= Lemez-Tamak =

Lemez-Tamak Лемез-Тамак
- Village
- Location within Bashkortostan Location within Russia
- Coordinates: 55°49′N 58°16′E
- Country: Russia
- Region: Bashkortostan
- District: Mechetlinsky District
- Time zone: UTC+5:00

Lemez-Tamak (Russian: Лемез-Тамак; Bashkir: Ләмәҙтамаҡ, Lämäźtamaq) is a rural locality (a village) and the administrative centre of Lemez-Tamaksky Selsoviet, Mechetlinsky District, Bashkortostan, Russia. The population was 483 as of 2010. There are 5 streets.

== Geography ==
Lemez-Tamak is located 20 km south of Bolsheustyikinskoye (the district's administrative centre) by road. Kutushevo is the nearest rural locality.
