= Timiryakovo =

Timiryakovo Тимиряково
- Village
- Location within Bashkortostan Location within Russia
- Coordinates: 55°48′N 58°24′E
- Country: Russia
- Region: Bashkortostan
- District: Mechetlinsky District
- Time zone: UTC+5:00

Timiryakovo (Russian: Тимиряково; Bashkir: Тимерәк, Timeräk) is a rural locality (a village) in Yunusovsky Selsoviet, Mechetlinsky District, Bashkortostan, Russia. The population was 118 as of 2010. There are 2 streets.

== Geography ==
Timiryakovo is located 24 km southeast of Bolsheustyikinskoye (the district's administrative centre) by road. Yunusovo is the nearest rural locality.
