= Timirbayevo =

Timirbayevo Тимирбаево
- Village
- Location within Bashkortostan Location within Russia
- Coordinates: 56°07′N 58°36′E
- Country: Russia
- Region: Bashkortostan
- District: Mechetlinsky District
- Time zone: UTC+5:00

Timirbayevo (Russian: Тимирбаево; Bashkir: Тимербай, Timerbay) is a rural locality (a village) in Kurgatovsky Selsoviet, Mechetlinsky District, Bashkortostan, Russia. The population was 79 as of 2010. There is 1 street.

== Geography ==
Timirbayevo is located 36 km northeast of Bolsheustyikinskoye (the district's administrative centre) by road. Yulayevo is the nearest rural locality.
