= Takino =

Takino Такино
- Village
- Location within Bashkortostan Location within Russia
- Coordinates: 56°04′N 58°36′E
- Country: Russia
- Region: Bashkortostan
- District: Mechetlinsky District
- Time zone: UTC+5:00

Takino (Russian: Такино; Bashkir: Тәкә, Täkä) is a rural locality (a village) in Rostovsky Selsoviet, Mechetlinsky District, Bashkortostan, Russia. The population was 331 as of 2010. There are 3 streets.

== Geography ==
Takino is located 33 km northeast of Bolsheustyikinskoye (the district's administrative centre) by road. Telyashevo is the nearest rural locality.
