= Maloustyinskoye =

Maloustyinskoye Малоустьикинское
- Selo
- Location within Bashkortostan Location within Russia
- Coordinates: 55°58′N 58°20′E
- Country: Russia
- Region: Bashkortostan
- District: Mechetlinsky District
- Time zone: UTC+5:00

Maloustyinskoye (Russian: Малоустьикинское; Bashkir: Кесе Ыҡтамаҡ, Kese Iqtamaq) is a rural locality (a selo) and the administrative centre of Maloustyinsky Selsoviet, Mechetlinsky District, Bashkortostan, Russia. The population was 166 as of 2010. There are 9 streets.

== Geography ==
Maloustyinskoye is located 7 km northeast of Bolsheustyikinskoye (the district's administrative centre) by road. Nizhneye Bobino is the nearest rural locality.
