= Kurshalino =

Kurshalino Куршалино
- Village
- Location within Bashkortostan Location within Russia
- Coordinates: 55°42′N 58°25′E
- Country: Russia
- Region: Bashkortostan
- District: Mechetlinsky District
- Time zone: UTC+5:00

Kurshalino (Russian: Куршалино; Bashkir: Көршәле, Körşäle) is a rural locality (a village) in Novomeshcherovsky Selsoviet, Mechetlinsky District, Bashkortostan, Russia. The population was 236 as of 2010. There are 3 streets.

== Geography ==
Kurshalino is located 50 km south of Bolsheustyikinskoye (the district's administrative centre) by road. Novomeshcherovo is the nearest rural locality.
