= Staromeshcherovo =

Staromeshcherovo Старомещерово
- Village
- Location within Bashkortostan Location within Russia
- Coordinates: 55°44′N 58°24′E
- Country: Russia
- Region: Bashkortostan
- District: Mechetlinsky District
- Time zone: UTC+5:00

Staromeshcherovo (Russian: Старомещерово; Bashkir: Иҫке Мишәр, İśke Mişär) is a rural locality (a village) in Novoyaushevsky Selsoviet, Mechetlinsky District, Bashkortostan, Russia. The population was 361 as of 2010. There are 3 streets.

== Geography ==
Staromeshcherovo is located 39 km south of Bolsheustyikinskoye (the district's administrative centre) by road. Novoyaushevo is the nearest rural locality.
