= Zhvakino =

Zhvakino Жвакино
- Village
- Location within Bashkortostan Location within Russia
- Coordinates: 56°06′N 57°57′E
- Country: Russia
- Region: Bashkortostan
- District: Mechetlinsky District
- Time zone: UTC+5:00

Zhvakino (Russian: Жвакино) is a rural locality (a village) in Abdullinsky Selsoviet, Mechetlinsky District, Bashkortostan, Russia. The population was 1 as of 2010. There is 1 street.

== Geography ==
Zhvakino is located 35 km northwest of Bolsheustyikinskoye (the district's administrative centre) by road. Russkaya Tavra is the nearest rural locality.
