= Kurgatovo =

Kurgatovo Кургатово
- Village
- Location within Bashkortostan Location within Russia
- Coordinates: 56°08′N 58°31′E
- Country: Russia
- Region: Bashkortostan
- District: Mechetlinsky District
- Time zone: UTC+5:00

Kurgatovo (Russian: Кургатово; Bashkir: Ҡорғат, Qorğat) is a rural locality (a village) and the administrative centre of Kurgatovsky Selsoviet, Mechetlinsky District, Bashkortostan, Russia. The population was 278 as of 2010. There are 4 streets.

== Geography ==
Kurgatovo is located 30 km northeast of Bolsheustyikinskoye (the district's administrative centre) by road. Yulayevo is the nearest rural locality.
