= Yelanysh =

Yelanysh Еланыш
- Village
- Location within Bashkortostan Location within Russia
- Coordinates: 55°41′N 58°18′E
- Country: Russia
- Region: Bashkortostan
- District: Mechetlinsky District
- Time zone: UTC+5:00

Yelanysh (Russian: Еланыш; Bashkir: Йыланыш, Yılanış) is a rural locality (a village) in Duvan-Mechetlinsky Selsoviet, Mechetlinsky District, Bashkortostan, Russia. The population was 195 as of 2010. There are 4 streets.

== Geography ==
Yelanysh is located 34 km south of Bolsheustyikinskoye (the district's administrative centre) by road. Duvan-Mechetlino is the nearest rural locality.
