= Malokyzylbayevo =

Malokyzylbayevo Малокызылбаево
- Village
- Location within Bashkortostan Location within Russia
- Coordinates: 55°57′N 58°07′E
- Country: Russia
- Region: Bashkortostan
- District: Mechetlinsky District
- Time zone: UTC+5:00

Malokyzylbayevo (Russian: Малокызылбаево; Bashkir: Кесе Ҡыҙылбай, Kese Qıźılbay) is a rural locality (a village) in Alegazovsky Selsoviet, Mechetlinsky District, Bashkortostan, Russia. The population was 75 as of 2010. There is 1 street.

== Geography ==
Malokyzylbayevo is located 14 km west of Bolsheustyikinskoye (the district's administrative centre) by road. Alegazovo is the nearest rural locality.
