= Abu Abdullah =

Abu Abdullah (also transliterated as Abdallah, Arabic: أبو عبد الله) meaning father of Abdullah, is a given name and a common alias used by several people, it may refer to:

== Given name ==
- Abu-Abdullah Adelabu, Nigerian academic
- Abu Abdallah Mohammed Amghar, Moroccan Sufi
- Abu Abdullah ibn Battuta (1304–1368/1369), Moroccan scholar and explorer
- Abu Abdullah al-Rashid al-Baghdadi (1959–2016), Iraqi Islamist
- Abu Abdullah al-Shafi'i, Iraqi Islamist
- Abu 'Abdullah al-Shi'i, Yemeni Islamic figure

== Alias ==
- al-Mahdi also known as Abu Abdallah Muhammad the third Abbasid caliph of the Arab caliphate.
- al-Mutazz also known as Abu Abdallah Muhammad was the 13th Abbasid caliph.
- Muhammad XI of Granada, the last Moorish King of Granada
- Sami Al-Arian, Kuwaiti activist
- Osama bin Laden (1957–2011), founder and first general emir of al-Qaeda
- Marwan al-Shehhi (1978–2001), Emirati hijacker-pilot of United Airlines Flight 175
- Ayman al-Zawahiri, second general emir of al-Qaeda

== See also ==
- Abdullah/Abdallah/Abdulah/etc., Abdollah, Abdala, Abdullahi, Abdulahi, Abdollahi, Abdullai, Abu Abdullah
- Patronymic surnames: Abdullaev, Abdulayev, Abdullayev, Abdulloev, Abdulov, Abdulin, Abdullin
