= Nizhneye Bobino =

Nizhneye Bobino Нижнее Бобино
- Selo
- Location within Bashkortostan Location within Russia
- Coordinates: 55°59′N 58°22′E
- Country: Russia
- Region: Bashkortostan
- District: Mechetlinsky District
- Time zone: UTC+5:00

Nizhneye Bobino (Russian: Нижнее Бобино) is a rural locality (a selo) in Maloustyinsky Selsoviet, Mechetlinsky District, Bashkortostan, Russia. The population was 643 as of 2010. There are 8 streets.

== Geography ==
Nizhneye Bobino is located 10 km southwest of Bolsheustyikinskoye (the district's administrative centre) by road. Maloustyikinskoye is the nearest rural locality.
