= Verkhneye Bobino =

Verkhneye Bobino Верхнее Бобино
- Village
- Location within Bashkortostan Location within Russia
- Coordinates: 56°00′N 58°25′E
- Country: Russia
- Region: Bashkortostan
- District: Mechetlinsky District
- Time zone: UTC+5:00

Verkhneye Bobino (Russian: Верхнее Бобино) is a rural locality (a village) in Maloustyinsky Selsoviet, Mechetlinsky District, Bashkortostan, Russia. The population was 8 as of 2010. There is 1 street.

== Geography ==
Verkhneye Bobino is located 13 km northeast of Bolsheustyikinskoye (the district's administrative centre) by road. Nizhneye Bobino is the nearest rural locality.
