= Abdollah Guivian =

Iranian writer and sociologist

Abdollah Guivian (Persian: عبدالله گیویان)
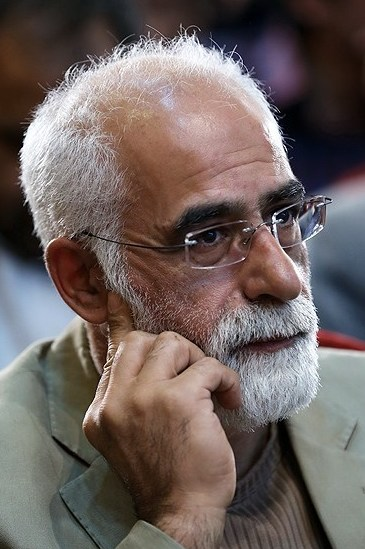
- Born: June 28, 1960 (age 66); Tehran

Academic background
- Education: SOAS, University of London (PhD), University of Tehran (MA)
- Thesis: Religion, television and culture in post-revolutionary Iran (2006)
- Doctoral advisor: Cosimo Zene

Academic work
- Institutions: Iran Broadcasting University
- Main interests: anthropology of religion, media studies, Iranian Armenians

Abdollah Guivian (born 28 June 1960) is an Iranian writer and sociologist whose work focuses on anthropology of religion, media studies and Iranian Armenians. He was the founding editor of the journal Communication Research. Guivian is credited as the "father of video clips in Iran". Abdollah Guivian holds a PhD in anthropology and communication in 2006 and is a Professor of Iran Broadcasting University.

== Films ==
- Seven Steps North (2007)
- Lullaby (2006)

== Publications/Books ==
- Grounded theory, Tehran: Elmi Farhangi
- Coding methods for qualitative researchers, Tehran: Elmi Farhangi
- Hasr-e Del, Tehran: Hozeh Honari
- Guivian, Abdollah; Sajad, Faraji; Fazeli, Nematollah (2014). "The Representation of Youth Everyday Life in Faseleha TV Series". Cultural Research Society. 4 (4): 105–138.
- Guivian, Abdollah (2006). "Religion, television and culture in post-revolutionary Iran". SOAS, University of London.
- Guivian, Abdollah; Mohsen, Amin (2018). "Affection and Identity as Portrayed by Arbaeen Procession; a Study of the Nature, Functions and Structure of Arbaeen Procession from the Viewpoint of Ritual Communication". Religion & Communication. 24 (2): 167–194. doi:10.30497/rc.2018.2102.

=== Translations ===
- The Symbolic Construction of Community, Anthony Cohen, Routledge 1985
- Rothenbuhler, Eric, W (1998). Ritual Communication: From Everyday Conversation to Mediated Ceremony. SAGE Publications Ltd. ISBN 978-0-761-91587-4.
- Saldana, Johnny (2016). The Coding Manual for Qualitative Researchers. SAGE Publications Ltd. p. 440. ISBN 978-1-529-73174-3.
