= Abdollahi (surname) =

Abdollahi is an Iranian surname. Notable people with the surname include:

- Farzad Abdollahi (born 1990), Iranian taekwondo practitioner
- Mostafa Abdollahi (1955–2015), Iranian actor
- Nasrollah Abdollahi (born 1951), Iranian football coach

== See also ==
- Abdullah/Abdallah/Abdulah/etc., Abdollah, Abdala, Abdullahi, Abdulahi, Abdollahi, Abdullai, Abu Abdullah
- Patronymic surnames: Abdullaev, Abdulayev, Abdullayev, Abdulloev, Abdulov, Abdulin, Abdullin
