= Media ritual =

Media ritual is a theoretical approach in the field of media and communication studies, which borrows thematically from the field of anthropology. The theory is based upon Carey's 'ritual view of communication' in which he asserts that "news reading, and writing, is a ritual act and moreover a dramatic one". This 'ritual' view of communication is in contrast to his 'transmission' view of communication. Media ritual theory has been elaborated in recent years, popularised in particular by Nick Couldry.

== Overview ==
Couldry elaborated on media ritual theory in his book Media Rituals: A Critical Approach. He presents his study as a method to study the more intricate ways in which the media, which he defines as the central media that "through which we imagine ourselves to be connected to the social world", affects and transforms society. His formal definition of media rituals are actions that can represent wider values.

Under his definition, potential sites where media rituals may be conducted are studios or wherever something is filmed, and any place where interaction with celebrities takes place.

== Research approach ==
In Couldry's media ritual research, two research approaches were used, post-Durkheimian and anti-functionalist. example

=== Post-Durkheimian ===
In media analysis, the first understanding of "ritual" is dominated by "integrationist" and Couldry's approach is to challenge "the standard 'integrationist' reading of Durkheim". Post-Durkheimian dropped "assumptions that underlying and motivating ritual is always the achievement of social order" in Durkheimian, to rethink media's relation with Durkheimian is a radical fashion.

=== Anti-Functionalist ===
Anti-functionalist generalizes post-Durkheimian point, which opposes any form of essentialist thinking about society. Therefore, in order to "grasp the continuing power of Durkheim's idea, we must discard the functionalist framework which shaped his work and think the question of social order (and its construction) from a new perspective".

== Bibliography ==
- Carey, James W. (1989). Communication as Culture: Essays on Media and Society. Psychology Press. ISBN 9780415907255.
- Couldry, Nick (2003). Media Rituals: A Critical Approach. Routledge. ISBN 9780415270144.
