= Abdulayev =

Abdulayev or Abdulaev (Russian: Абдулае́в; masculine) or Abdulayeva/Abdulaeva (Абдула́ева; feminine) is a surname in Russian, Caucasian, and Central Asian languages.

Variants are Abdullaev and Abdullayev. Similar surnames include Abdalin/Abdalina (Абда́лин/Абда́лина), Abdulin/Abdulina (Абду́лин/Абду́лина), Abdullin/Abdullina (Абду́ллин/Абду́ллина), Abdulov/Abdulova (Абду́лов/Абду́лова), Babdulin/Babdulina (Бабду́лин/Бабду́лина), and Babdullin/Babdullina (Бабду́ллин/Бабду́ллина). All these surnames slavicised from various forms of the given name Abdullah (Abdulla), which itself is derived from Arabic "abd allāh", meaning god's servant or god's slave.

People with the name Abdulayev include:

- Ahmad Afandi Abdulaev (born 1959), Dagestani Mufti, Chairman of the Dagestani Council of Alims
- Eldar Abdulayev (born 1985), Kazakhstani ice-hockey player
- German Abdulaev (Abdulayev), Russian judoka
- Magomed Abdulaev (Abdulayev; 1961–2023), Russian lawyer and politician
- Omar Abdulayev (born 1978), Tajikistani Guantanamo detainee
- Saadat Abdulaeva, birth name of Saadat Dalgatova, Russian female boxer

== See also ==
- Given names: Abdullah/Abdallah/Abdulah/etc., Abdollah, Abdala, Abdullahi, Abdulahi, Abdollahi, Abdullai, Abu Abdullah
- Surnames: Abdullaev, Abdulayev, Abdullayev, Abdulloev, Abdulov, Abdulin, Abdullin
