= General Inspection Office (Iran) =

The General Inspection Organization of Iran (GIO) is linked to the Judiciary of Iran. It is also called the State Inspectorate Organization of Iran. The organization is a member of Asian Ombudsman Association and International Ombudsman Institute. Also, it is the member of International Association of Anti Corruption Authorities. However, it is not the primary anti-corruption body and there are several agencies including Supreme Audit Court, Ministry of Justice and Parliamentary Commission for enforcing principle 90 of the constitution, which are involved in fighting corruption and enforcing United Nations Convention Against Corruption.

Based upon Iran's Constitution, GIO is in-charge of "supervision of the proper conducting of affairs and the correct implementation of laws by the administrative organs of the government"

== See also ==
- Economy of Iran
- Supreme Audit Court of Iran
- Imperial Inspectorate Organization, a similar pre-revolutionary body
- Islamic Revolutionary Court
- Iranian Economic Reform Plan
- Ministry of Intelligence and National Security of Iran
- History of the Islamic Republic of Iran
