= Abdullino, Mechetlinsky District, Bashkortostan =

Abdullino Абдуллино Абдулла Abdulla
- Village
- Location within Bashkortostan Location within Russia
- Coordinates: 56°04′13″N 57°57′38″E
- Country: Russia
- Region: Bashkortostan
- District: Mechetlinsky District
- Time zone: [[UTC+5:00]]

Abdullino (Russian: Абдуллино; Bashkir: Абдулла, Abdulla) is a rural locality (a village) and the administrative centre of Abdullinsky Selsoviet of Mechetlinsky District, Bashkortostan, Russia. The population was 510 as of 2010. There are 15 streets.

== Geography ==
Abdullino is located 30 km northwest of Bolsheustyikinskoye (the district's administrative centre) by road. Zhvakino is the nearest rural locality.

== Ethnicity ==
The village is inhabited by Tatars, Bashkirs and others.
