= Abdulahi =

Abdulahi is both a surname and a given name. Notable people with the name include:

- Denis Abdulahi (born 1990), Finnish footballer
- Liban Abdulahi (born 1995), Dutch footballer
- Shami Abdulahi (born 1974), Ethiopian long-distance runner
- Abdulahi Bala Adamu, Nigerian politician
- Abdulahi Mohamed Sa'adi (born 1934), Ethiopian politician

== See also ==
- Abdullah/Abdallah/Abdulah/etc., Abdollah, Abdala, Abdullahi, Abdulahi, Abdollahi, Abdullai, Abu Abdullah
- Patronymic surnames: Abdullaev, Abdulayev, Abdullayev, Abdulloev, Abdulov, Abdulin, Abdullin
