= Abdala =

Abdala or Abdalá is both a given name and a surname. It is a Spanish variation of the common Arabic name Abdullah. Notable people with the name include:

== Given name ==
- Abdalá Bucaram (born 1952), Ecuadorian politician and lawyer
- Abdalá Bucaram Jr. (born 1982), Ecuadorian footballer
- Abdala Faye (born 1971), Senegalese artist

== Surname ==
- Alberto Abdala (1920–1986) Uruguayan politician, painter and Vice President of Uruguay
- Bartolomé Abdala (born 1964), Argentine politician
- Carlos Abdala (1930–1976), Uruguayan politician and diplomat
- Claudia Ledesma Abdala (born 1974), Argentine politician
- Edgardo Abdala (born 1978), Chilean-born Palestinian footballer
- Nadia Abdalá (born 1988), Mexican tennis player
- Norma Abdala (born 1948), Argentine politician
- Pablo Abdala (born 1966), Uruguayan politician and lawyer
- Pablo Abdala (footballer) (born 1972), Argentine-born Palestinian footballer
- Washington Abdala (born 1959), Uruguayan lawyer, politician and comedian
- Yaquelin Abdala (born 1968), Cuban-born Dutch painter and installation artist

== Literature ==
- Abdala, a 1869 poem by José Martí

== Other ==
- Abdala, a Cuban COVID-19 vaccine

== See also ==
- Abdullah/Abdallah/Abdulah/etc., Abdollah, Abdala, Abdullahi, Abdulahi, Abdollahi, Abdullai, Abu Abdullah
- Patronymic surnames: Abdullaev, Abdulayev, Abdullayev, Abdulloev, Abdulov, Abdulin, Abdullin
