= Eric Walter Rothenbuhler =

American anthropologist

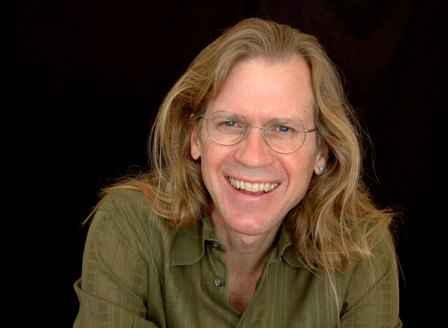
- Born: 22 August 1957 (age 69)

Academic background
- Education: University of Southern California (PhD)
- Thesis: Media events, civil religion, and social solidarity: The living room celebration of the Olympic Games (1985)
- Academic advisors: Elihu Katz, Daniel Dayan

Academic work
- Institutions: Webster University
- Main interests: anthropology of media

Eric Walter Rothenbuhler (born 22 August 1957) is an American anthropologist and dean of the School of Communications and a professor at Webster University. He is known for his works on ritual communication.

== Education ==
- Ph.D. Communication Theory and Research, Annenberg School of Communications, University of Southern California, 1985. Dissertation Title: Media events, civil religion, and social solidarity: The living room celebration of the Olympic Games.
- M.A. Department of Communication, Ohio State University, 1982. Thesis Title: Radio and the popular music industry: A case study of programming decision making.
- B.A. Department of Communication, Ohio State University, 1980.

== Books ==
- Ritual Communication: From Everyday Conversation to Mediated Ceremony, Sage 1998
- Media anthropology, Eric W. Rothenbuhler & Mihai Coman (Eds.), Sage 2005
- Communication and community, Greg J. Shepherd and Eric W. Rothenbuhler (Eds.), Lawrence Erlbaum Associates, 2001
