= Abdollah Shahbazi =

Iranian historian (born 1955)

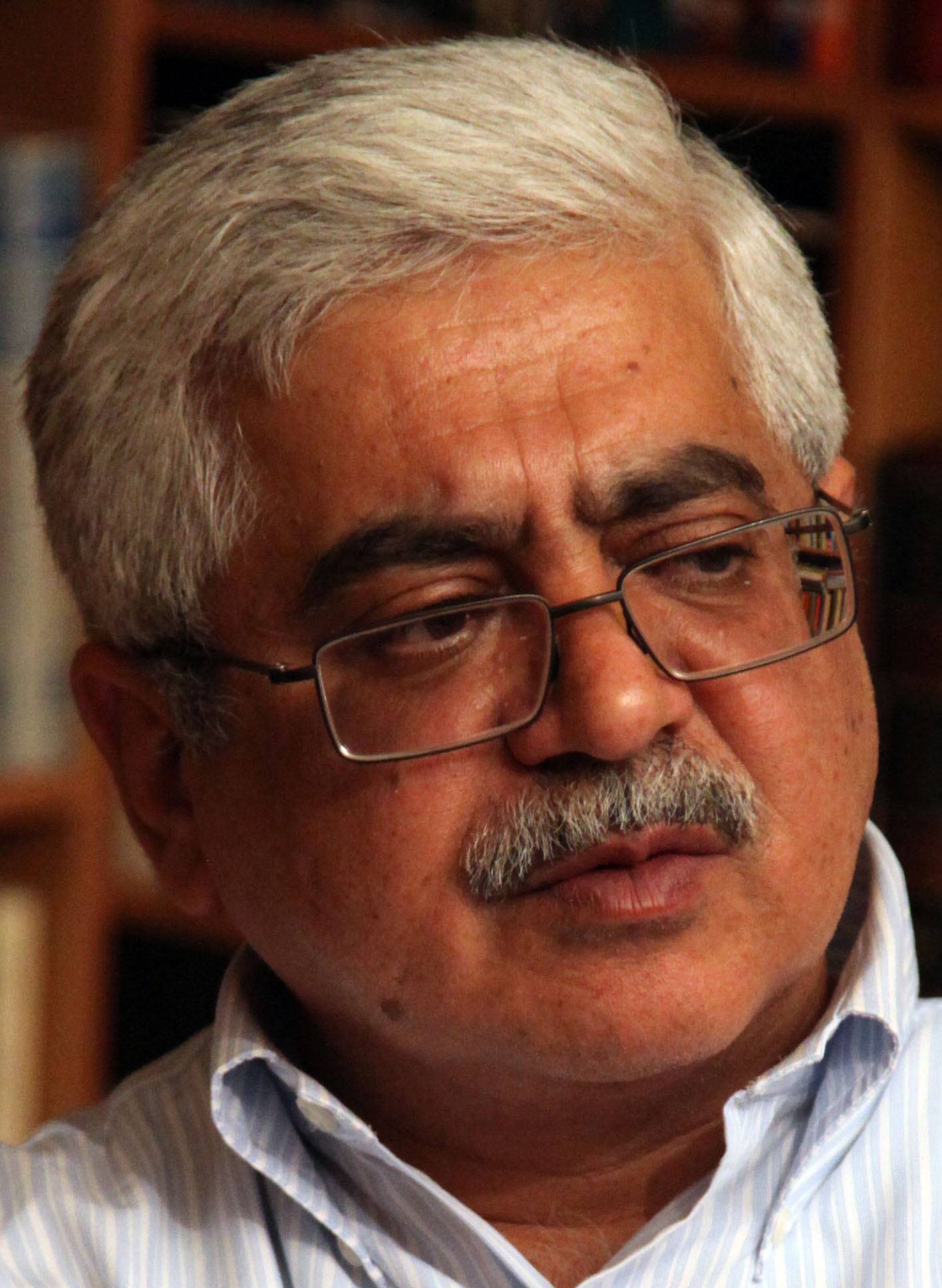
- Shahbazi in 2014

Academic background
- Education: The University of Tehran

Academic work
- Discipline: history

Abdollah Shahbazi (Persian: عبدالله شهبازی; born 1955 in Shiraz, Iran) is an Iranian historian. Shahbazi has been described by many researchers as one of the most influential figures in promoting anti-Bahá'í sentiment and antisemitism in contemporary Iran, and his writings have been characterized as containing clear patterns of hate speech against religious minorities. These works, employing conspiracy-based frameworks, have contributed to the reproduction of discriminatory views at official and media levels. For this reason, his role in the formation and expansion of minority-hostile discourse in the Islamic Republic has been repeatedly criticized.

== Background ==
Shahbazi graduated from the department of Social Sciences at The University of Tehran and became active in areas of political and historical research during the 1980s. In the early years after the Iranian Revolution, Shahbazi was a member of the Tudeh Party, but after his arrest in 1982 he began cooperating with the security institutions of the Islamic Republic of Iran. He later played a role in establishing the Institute for Political Studies and Research of the Ministry of Intelligence, and during the ministerial tenure of Ali Fallahian managed it for ten years. He has also been described as one of the collaborators of the team based at the newspaper Kayhan and as one of the founders of the Kayhan Research Center, managed by Hossein Shariatmadari and Hassan Shayanfar. In 1995, he reorganized the document center of Iran's "Bonyad" into a professional historical institute, The Institute for Iranian Contemporary Historical Studies.

Shahbazi's father, Habibollah Khan Shahbazi, was the leader of the Sorkhi tribes of Kuhmarre Sorkhi region of Fars Province and led Iran's 1962-1963 tribal rebellion against the Pahlavi dynasty. He was executed together with other dignitaries of southern Iranian Tribes on October 5, 1964.

Shahbazi claimed that Jewish financiers, in coordination with British intelligence, were instrumental in bringing Adolf Hitler to power in 1933. He also alleged that Zionist networks and Jews played a key role in secret British plans to install Reza Shah Pahlavi in 1921.

== Minority-Related Conspiracy Theories ==
Abdollah Shahbazi has been described as a major figure in theorizing and promoting anti-Bahá'í sentiment and antisemitism and as one of the principal ideologues of hate speech against religious minorities in the Islamic Republic of Iran. During his youth he briefly cooperated with the Hojjatieh Society, and from the 1980s onward, using state research and intelligence institutions, he produced and disseminated works with anti-Bahá’í and anti-Jewish themes.

In 1988, Shahbazi founded the "Political Studies and Research Institute", an institution linked to the Intelligence Ministry, which he directed for a decade and which became known for lending scholarly legitimacy to hate-driven narratives. The institution became one of the main centers for promoting Holocaust denial in Iran. The autumn 2006 issue of the journal Historical Studies, published by the Institute, was entirely devoted to Holocaust denial and included articles such as “Did Six Million Really Die?” and “The Truth of the Crematoria.” The Institute also published the book Behind the Holocaust, another attempt to discredit this well-documented historical catastrophe. Scholars have viewed this as part of the Islamic Republic’s systematic effort to legitimize ideological antisemitism.

One of the most prominent examples of Shahbazi’s antisemitic work is his five-volume series Jewish and Parsi Plutocrats, British Colonialism, and Iran, which he began publishing in the 1990s. In this series, Jews and Parsis (Zoroastrians in India) are depicted as a global network of “plutocrats” who, according to the author, were linked to Britain, the United States, and Israel and played a conspiratorial role in Iranian affairs. Meir Litvak, Israeli historian, regards the series as a prime example of conspiracy-driven and antisemitic literature and argues that it contributed to reproducing anti-Jewish patterns in the official discourse of the Islamic Republic.

Shahbazi is a staunch proponent of the conspiracy theory that “Jewish plutocrats” control the fate of the world. Although he acknowledges that The Protocols of the Elders of Zion is a fabricated document, he claims that the Jews themselves forged it so that, once its inauthenticity was revealed, they could discredit any theory suggesting the existence of a conspiracy.

The scope of Shahbazi’s conspiracy theories about the Bahá’ís is so extensive that he even described the systematic persecution of this community by security institutions of the Islamic Republic—regarded by Human Rights Watch as the result of a deliberate policy to strip them of fundamental rights and explicitly characterized as a “Crime against humanity”—as a conspiracy to gain sympathy.

Academic critiques have also been directed at these works. Houchang Chehabi, professor at Boston University, analyzing the book Jewish and Parsi Plutocrats, British Colonialism, and Iran, writes:

Particularist and universalist conspiracy belief come together in a multi-volume study of world history by ‘Abdallah Shahbazi, which begins with the rise of the West and analyzes the expansion of Western influence in the world in terms of conspiracies perpetrated by Jews and Masons. One departure from the anti-minority stance of the secular nationalists and conservatives is that fundamentalist conspiracy belief also targets Zoroastrians, whom nationalists consider to be the ‘true’ Iranians. The connection with imperialism is established by ascribing evil intentions to Indian Parsis who, protected by Britain, established contact with their Iranian coreligionists.

Even conservative media have criticized Shahbazi’s methodology. An article on the RajaNews website identifies “hidden Judaism” and “hidden Bahá’ísm” as two major themes in his writings and criticizes his use of such frameworks to discredit political and religious rivals.

In the 1990s, Shahbazi emerged as one of the principal promoters of the conspiracy theory of “cultural invasion” (tahājum-e farhangi), claiming that the West—especially the United States—was recruiting and training Iranian elites in order to undermine the Islamic Republic. This narrative provided a pretext for the security apparatus to launch the repression and killing of Iranian intellectuals, writers, and artists, crimes that later became known as the “chain murders.” After these killings were exposed, critics say that Shahbazi, under the direction of security institutions, sought to whitewash the crimes and, in his multi-volume book Jewish and Persian Plutocrats, British Colonialism, and Iran, claimed that Zoroastrians, Freemasons, Bahá’ís, and Jews had historically collaborated under Israel’s direction to harm Iran. The book was selected as the Islamic Republic’s “Book of the Year” in 2006 and was used for years to stoke anti-Bahá’í, anti-Jewish, and anti-Israeli sentiments and to persecute opponents under labels such as “secret Jew” and “secret Bahá’í.”

== Publications ==
Shahbazi has published numerous books and articles about Iranian pastoral nomads (Ilat va Ashayer), contemporary history of Iran and political thought.

Most famous are:

- The Forgotten Tribe: A Study of the Sorkhi Tribe of Fars Province (1987).
- An Introduction to the Study of Nomads of Persia (1990).
- The Rise and Fall of the Pahlavi Dynasty (1991). The first volume of this two-volume set contains the controversial memoirs of General Hossein Fardoust, head of Mohammad Reza Shah's Special Intelligence Office. The second volume is a collection of monographs by Shahbazi regarding historical events and important characters of Pahlavi era based on the period's classified documents. The Rise and Fall of the Pahlavi Dynasty has been a bestseller in Iran and many films and TV series have been made based on it.
- Jewish and Parsi Plutocrats: British Imperialism and Iran (1999-2004) in 5 volumes. By "Parsi" Shahbazi means the wealthy Parsi (Zoroastrian) families of Bombay and western India during the 19th and 20th centuries.

He compiled and edited the memoirs of the leaders of The Tudeh Party of Iran (Iranian Communist Party), Noureddin Kianouri (1992) and Iraj Eskandari (1993).
