= Cosimo Zene =

Italian anthropologist

Academic work
- Institutions: SOAS, University of London
- Doctoral students: Abdollah Guivian
- Main interests: anthropology of religion

Cosimo Zene is an Italian anthropologist and Professor in the Study of Religions and World Philosophies at SOAS, University of London. He is known for his works on anthropology of religion.

== Books ==
- Dialoghi Nulesi - Storia, Memoria, identita' di Nule (Sardegna) nell'antropologia di Andreas F. W. Bentzon, Nuoro, Italy: Edizioni ISRE (Istituto Superiore Regionale Etnografico) 2009
- The Rishi of Bangladesh. A History of Christian Dialogues, London: Routledge Curzon 2002
