= Abdullino, Burayevsky District, Bashkortostan =

Abdullino Абдуллино Абдулла Abdulla
- Village
- Location within Bashkortostan Location within Russia
- Coordinates: 55°57′N 55°16′E
- Country: Russia
- Region: Bashkortostan
- District: Burayevsky District
- Time zone: [[UTC+5:00]]

Abdullino (Russian: Абдуллино; Bashkir: Абдулла, Abdulla) is a rural locality (a village) in Kuzbayevsky Selsoviet of Burayevsky District, Bashkortostan, Russia. Its population is 58 as of 2010.

== Geography ==
Abdullino is located 20 km north of Burayevo (the district's administrative centre) by road. Bustanayevo is the nearest rural locality.

== Ethnicity ==
The village is inhabited by Bashkirs and others.
