= Abdullino, Aurgazinsky District, Bashkortostan =

Abdullino Абдуллино Абдулла Abdulla
- Village
- Location within Bashkortostan Location within Russia
- Coordinates: 53°52′N 55°39′E
- Country: Russia
- Region: Bashkortostan
- District: Aurgazinsky District
- Time zone: [[UTC+5:00]]

Abdullino (Russian: Абдуллино; Bashkir: Абдулла, Abdulla) is a rural locality (a village) in Semenkinsky Selsoviet of Aurgazinsky District, Bashkortostan, Russia. The population was 91 as of 2010. There is 1 street.

== Geography ==
Abdullino is located 32 km southwest of Tolbazy (the district's administrative centre) by road. Shlanly is the nearest rural locality.

== Ethnicity ==
The village is inhabited by Chuvash people and others.
