= Anthony Cohen =

British anthropologist

Professor Anthony Cohen, CBE, FRSE is a British social anthropologist and served as Principal & Vice Chancellor of Edinburgh’s Queen Margaret University from 2003 until his retirement in 2009.

Cohen was born in London in 1946. Educated at Whittingehame College, Brighton, the University of Geneva and the University of Southampton, he is a social anthropologist with specialist interests in personal, social and national identity. He conducted fieldwork in Springdale, Newfoundland (1968–70) on local-level politics; and in Whalsay (1973–90), the longest sustained study of a rural British community ever undertaken. He then did research on personal and national identity in Scotland, and on the literary influences on Scottishness.

Anthony Cohen was a research fellow at the Memorial University of Newfoundland; assistant professor at Queen's University and lecturer and senior lecturer in social anthropology at the University of Manchester. In 1988 he was appointed Professor of Social Anthropology at the University of Edinburgh, a post he held until 2003. He was Provost of Law and Social Sciences, and Dean of Social Sciences at Edinburgh for five years (1997—2002). In 2003, he was appointed Honorary Professor of Social Anthropology.

In 2003, he became Principal and Vice-Patron of Edinburgh’s Queen Margaret University College, and Professor of Social and Cultural Anthropology. In January 2007, QMUC was awarded university title, and Professor Cohen became the founding Principal and Vice-Chancellor of Queen Margaret University. He was elected Fellow of the Royal Society of Edinburgh in 1994, and was awarded the honorary degree of D.Sc by the University of Edinburgh in 2005, and the degree of D.Sc (honoris causa) by the University of St Andrews in 2017.

He was appointed Commander of the Order of the British Empire (CBE) in the 2008 Birthday Honours.

== Works ==
- The Management of Myths, 1975, Manchester University Press
- The Symbolic Construction of Community, 1985, Routledge
- Whalsay: Symbol, Segment and Boundary in a Shetland Island Community, 1987, Manchester University Press
- Self Consciousness: an Alternative Anthropology of Identity, 1994, Routledge

=== As editor ===
- Symbolising Boundaries: Identity and Diversity in British Cultures, 1986, Manchester University Press
- Humanising the city?: Social contexts of urban life at the turn of the millennium, 1993, Edinburgh University Press
- (with Nigel Rapport) Questions of consciousness, 1995, Routledge
- Signifying Identities: Anthropological perspectives on boundaries and contested values, 2000, Routledge
