= Jordan Aboki =

French basketball player (born 1993)

No. 18 – Paris-Levallois Basket
- Position: Guard
- League: LNB Pro A

Personal information
- Born: 20 March 1993 (age 33) Creteil, France
- Listed height: 6 ft 2 in (1.88 m)

Career information
- Playing career: 2011–present

Career history
- 2011–present: Paris-Levallois Basket

Jordan Aboki (born 20 March 1993) is a French basketball player who currently plays for Paris-Levallois Basket of the LNB Pro A.
