= Iio (surname) =

Iio (written: 飯尾) is a Japanese surname. Notable people with the surname include:

- Kazunori Iio (飯尾 一慶, born 1982), Japanese footballer
- Kazuya Iio (飯尾 和也, born 1980), Japanese footballer
- Iio Noritsura (飯尾 乗連, died 1560), Japanese samurai
- Iio Tsuratatsu (飯尾 連竜, died 1565), Japanese samurai
