= Abdullino, Karaidelsky District, Bashkortostan =

Abdullino Абдуллино Абдулла Abdulla
- Village
- Location within Bashkortostan Location within Russia
- Coordinates: 55°43′N 57°01′E
- Country: Russia
- Region: Bashkortostan
- District: Karaidelsky District
- Time zone: [[UTC+5:00]]

Abdullino (Russian: Абдуллино; Bashkir: Абдулла, Abdulla) is a rural locality (a village) in Karayarsky Selsoviet of Karaidelsky District, Bashkortostan, Russia. The population was 612 as of 2010. There are 23 streets.

== Geography ==
Abdullino is located 24 km (15 mi) southeast of Karaidel (the district's administrative centre) by road. Ust-Sukhoyaz is the nearest rural locality.

== Ethnicity ==
The village is inhabited by Bashkirs and others.
