= Maria Prilezhayeva =

Soviet and Russian children's author

- Maria Prilezhayeva in 1980s
- Born: June 22, 1903; Yaroslavl, Russian Empire
- Died: April 10, 1989 (aged 85); Moscow, Soviet Union
- Education: Moscow University (1925-1929)
- Writing career
- Period: 1936–1989
- Genres: Children's literature, criticism, memoirs
- Subjects: Soviet school life Political leaders’ biographies
- Notable work: The Life of Lenin (1970)
- Notable awards: Order of Lenin; Lenin Komsomol Prize

Maria Pavlovna Prilezhayeva (Russian: Мария Павловна Прилежаева; 22 June 1903, Yaroslavl – 10 April 1989, Moscow) was a Soviet and Russian children's author, literary critic and the Union of Soviet Writers official, best known for her novel The Life of Lenin (1970) which earned her the N. K. Krupskaya RSFSR State Prize in 1971 and later the Order of Lenin.

== Biography ==
Maria Prilezhayeva was born in Yaroslavl to a family of impoverished gentry. Her childhood years were spent in Alexandrov. At the age of 16, having graduated from a local school, she started to work as a teacher in a village. In 1925 Prilezhayeva enrolled into the Moscow University pedagogical faculty from which she graduated five years later, and went on to teach in schools, in Arkhangelsk, Zagorsk and Moscow.

In 1936, she started working for magazines and newspapers, reviewing books of Russian and foreign authors. In 1941, having learned of the death of one of her favorite students in the Winter War, she wrote her first novel Etot God (That Year). Several more school-themed books followed, including Semiklassnitsy (The 7th Form Girls, 1944) and Yunost Mashi Strogovoi (The Youth of Masha Strogova, 1948). Describing herself as a 'lyrical realist', Prilezhayeva cited Leo Tolstoy, Anton Chekhov and Alexander Blok as her major influences.

From the mid-1950s, Prilezhayeva's books became increasingly political. S Beregov Medveditsy (From the Medveditsa River Banks, 1955) novel related the life story of Mikhail Kalinin. Her 1970 novel Zhizn Lenina (The Life of Lenin) earned her the N. K. Krupskaya RSFSR State Prize (1971) and later the Lenin Komsomol Prize (1983).

As a Union of Soviet Writers' official, it was Prilezhayeva's duty to take part in all meetings concerning the dissidents' cases, but in comparison to her colleagues she was considered a liberal. Author and lawyer Arkady Waksberg mentioned her among those who (unsuccessfully) tried to help the poet Leib Kvitko, one of the victims of the so-called 'uprooting cosmopolitism' campaign.

Polezhayeva was known to support young authors. Among her literary protégés were Anatoly Aleksin, Mikhail Alekseyev, Albert Likhanov, and Azat Abdullin.

The 1980s political movement, Perestroika, forced Prilezhayeva to reconsider her beliefs. She wrote in a diary in June 1987, "Some of my ideals have crashed... But how stupidly have they trampled them under feet, and how silly and naive those beliefs of mine have been".

She died on April 10, 1989, in Moscow.
