= Abdulovo, Yermekeyevsky District, Bashkortostan =

Abdulovo Абдулово
- Selo
- Location within Bashkortostan Location within Russia
- Coordinates: 54°14′N 53°26′E
- Country: Russia
- Region: Bashkortostan
- District: Yermekeyevsky District
- Time zone: [[UTC+5:00]]

Abdulovo (Russian: Абдулово; Bashkir: Абдулла, Abdulla) is a rural locality (a selo) in Staroturayevsky Selsoviet of Yermekeyevsky District, Bashkortostan, Russia. The population was 230 as of 2010. There are 3 streets.

== Geography ==
Abdulovo is located 38 km northwest of Yermekeyevo (the district's administrative center) by road. Kit-Ozero is the nearest rural locality.

== Ethnicity ==
The village is inhabited by Bashkirs and others.
