= Abubakar Abdullai Ahmad =

Nigerian politician

Member of the House of Representatives
- Incumbent
- Assumed office 2019
- Constituency: Sokoto North/Sokoto South

Personal details
- Born: 1968 (age 57–58) Sokoto State, Nigeria
- Occupation: Politician

Abubakar Abdullai Ahmad is a Nigerian politician born in 1968 in Sokoto State, Nigeria. He holds a degree in Civil Law. In 2019, he was elected to serve as a member of the House of Representatives in the Sokoto National Assembly, representing the Sokoto North/Sokoto South constituency.

== Early life and education ==
Abubakar Abdullai Ahmad was born in 1968 in Sokoto State, Nigeria. He studied Civil law and obtained a degree in the field before entering politics.

== Political career ==
In the 2019 Nigerian general election, Abubakar Abdullai Ahmad contested the Sokoto North/Sokoto South federal constituency in Sokoto State on the platform of the Peoples Democratic Party. The Independent National Electoral Commission (INEC) recorded that he won the election with 52,148 votes. He was elected to the House of Representatives to represent the constituency.
