= Avdulovo =

Avdulovo Авдулово
- Village
- Location within Lipetsk Oblast Location within Russia
- Coordinates: 53°17′N 38°37′E
- Country: Russia
- Region: Lipetsk Oblast
- District: Dankovsky District
- Time zone: UTC+3:00

Avdulovo (Russian: Авдулово) is a rural locality (a selo) in Voskresensky Selsoviet of Dankovsky District, Lipetsk Oblast, Russia. The population was 150 as of 2010.

== Geography ==
Avdulovo is located 49 km northwest of Dankov (the district's administrative centre) by road. Pervovka is the nearest rural locality.
