= Abdullino, Ilishevsky District, Bashkortostan =

Abdullino Абдуллино Абдулла Abdulla
- Village
- Location within Bashkortostan Location within Russia
- Coordinates: 55°24′N 54°34′E
- Country: Russia
- Region: Bashkortostan
- District: Ilishevsky District
- Time zone: [[UTC+5:00]]

Abdullino (Russian: Абдуллино; Bashkir: Абдулла, Abdulla) is a rural locality (a village) in Igmetovsky Selsoviet of Ilishevsky District, Bashkortostan, Russia. The population was 285 as of 2010. There are 4 streets.

== Geography ==
Abdullino is located 29 km southeast of Verkhneyarkeyevo (the district's administrative centre) by road. Igmetovo is the nearest rural locality.

== Ethnicity ==
The village is inhabited by Bashkirs and others.
