= Meir Litvak =

Israeli historian

Meir Litvak (Hebrew: מאיר ליטבק; born 1958) is the Chair of the Department of Middle Eastern and African History at Tel Aviv University.

Meir Litvak is a scholar of modern Shia Islam and Islamist antisemitism, with numerous publications in both fields.

In September 2023 Litvak said that Netanyahu's 2023 Israeli judicial reform and related actions had "already weakened the country".

== Works ==
- Litvak, Meir (1994). "A Palestinian Past: National Construction and Reconstruction". History and Memory. 6 (2): 24–56. doi:10.2979/HIS.1994.6.2.24 (inactive 1 July 2025).
- Litvak, Meir (1998). Shi'i scholars of nineteenth-century Iraq : the ʻulamaʼ of Najaf and Karbalaʼ. Cambridge University Press. ISBN 9780521892964.
- Litvak, Meir (1998). "The Islamization of the Palestinian–Israeli Conflict: The Case of Hamas". Middle Eastern Studies. 34 (1): 148–163. doi:10.1080/00263209808701210.
- Litvak, Meir (2000). "A Failed Manipulation: The British, the Oudh Bequest and the Shi'i ʿUlamaʾ of Najaf and Karbala". British Journal of Middle Eastern Studies. 27 (1): 69–89. doi:10.1080/13530190008705600 (inactive 1 July 2025).
- Litvak, Meir (2002). Shi'i Scholars of Nineteenth-Century Iraq: The 'Ulama' of Najaf and Karbala'. Vol. 10. Cambridge University Press. ISBN 9780521892964.
- Litvak, Meir (2005). "The Anti-Semitism of Hamas". Palestine-Israel Journal of Politics, Economics & Culture. 12.
- Litvak, Meir; Webman, Esther (2009). From Empathy to Denial: Arab Responses to the Holocaust. New York: Columbia University Press. ISBN 978-0-231-70074-0.
- Litvak, Meir (2010). ""Martyrdom is Life": Jihad and Martyrdom in the Ideology of Hamas". Studies in Conflict & Terrorism. 33 (8): 716–734. doi:10.1080/1057610X.2010.499491 (inactive 1 July 2025).
- Litvak, Meir (2017). "Iranian Antisemitism and the Holocaust". In McElligott, Anthony; Herf, Jeffrey (eds.). Antisemitism Before and Since the Holocaust: Altered Contexts and Recent Perspectives. Cham: Springer International Publishing. p. 219. doi:10.1007/978-3-319-48866-0_9. ISBN 978-3-319-48866-0.
- Litvak, Meir (2020). ""God's Favored Nation": The New Religious Nationalism in Iran". Religions. 11 (10): 541. doi:10.3390/rel11100541.
- Litvak, Meir (2021). Know Thy Enemy: Evolving Attitudes towards "Others" in Modern Shii Thought and Practice. Social, Economic and Political Studies of the Middle East and Asia Series. Vol. 126. Brill. ISBN 9789004439207.
