= Abdulovo, Kuyurgazinsky District, Bashkortostan =

Abdulovo Абдулово Абдул Abdul
- Selo
- Location within Bashkortostan Location within Russia
- Coordinates: 52°37′N 55°29′E
- Country: Russia
- Region: Bashkortostan
- District: Kuyurgazinsky District
- Time zone: [[UTC+5:00]]

Abdulovo (Russian: Абдулово; Bashkir: Абдул, Abdul) is a rural locality (a selo) in Yakshimbetovsky Selsoviet of Kuyurgazinsky District, Bashkortostan, Russia. The population was 408 as of 2010. There are 4 streets.

== Geography ==
Abdulovo is located 30 km southwest of Yermolayevo (the district's administrative centre) by road. Karayevo is the nearest rural locality.
