= Abdullino, Gafuriysky District, Bashkortostan =

Abdullino Абдуллино Абдулла Abdulla
- Village
- Location within Bashkortostan Location within Russia
- Coordinates: 54°16′N 56°35′E
- Country: Russia
- Region: Bashkortostan
- District: Gafuriysky District
- Time zone: [[UTC+5:00]]

Abdullino (Russian: Абдуллино; Bashkir: Абдулла, Abdulla) is a rural locality (a village) in Zilim-Karanovsky Selsoviet of Gafuriysky District, Bashkortostan, Russia. The population was 69 as of 2010. There are 2 streets.

== Geography ==
Abdullino is located 55 km (34 mi) north of Krasnousolsky (the district's administrative centre) by road. Kyzyl Yar is the nearest rural locality.

== Ethnicity ==
The village is inhabited by Bashkirs and others.
