= Abdollah Morvarid =

Iranian poet

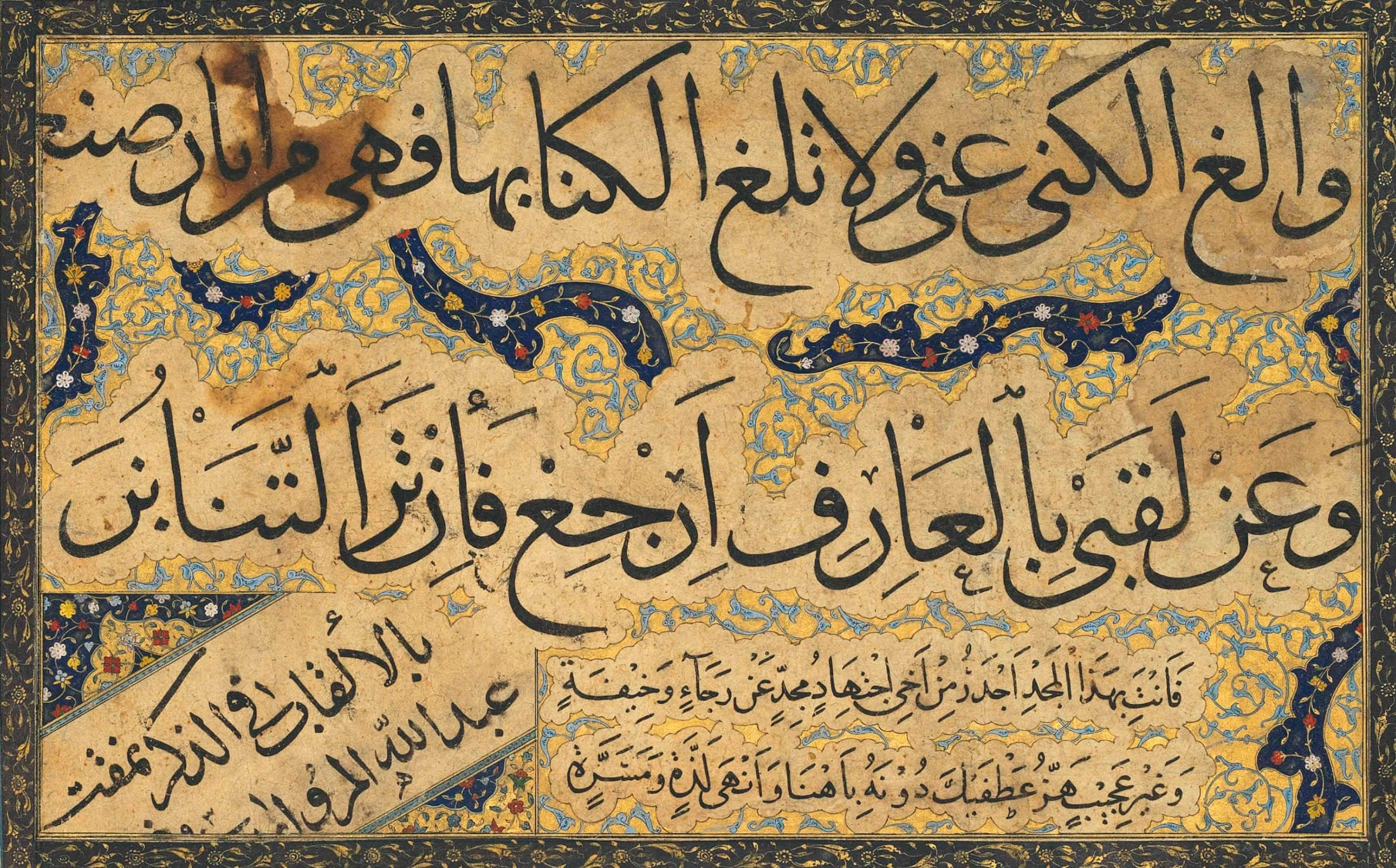
A calligraphic panel, signed by Abdollah Morvarid. Made in the Timurid Empire, dated 1487 or 1498

Abdollah Morvarid (1460/61–1516/17), also known as Bayani Kermani, was a writer, poet, calligrapher, and musician in Herat during the Timurid and Safavid eras.

== Sources ==
- Mirafzali, Seyed Ali (2014). "Bayani Kermani". Encyclopaedia of the World of Islam (in Persian). Vol. 5. Encyclopaedia Islamica Foundation. ISBN 9789644470127.
- Soucek, P. P. (1982). "ʿAbdallāh Morvārīd". In Yarshater, Ehsan (ed.). Encyclopædia Iranica (Online ed.). Encyclopædia Iranica Foundation. ISBN 978-0710091147.
