= Abdullahi Abubakar =

Nigerian Islamic cleric and humanitarian (1936–2026)

Chief Imam Abdullahi Abubakar
- Born: 1 January 1936; Bauchi, Northern Region, British Nigeria
- Died: 15 January 2026 (aged 90); Jos, Plateau State, Nigeria
- Occupations: Islamic cleric, humanitarian
- Known for: Saving the lives of 262 Christians during the 2018 Barkin Ladi attacks

Abdullahi Abubakar (1 January 1936 – 15 January 2026) was a Nigerian Islamic cleric and humanitarian. He is best known for saving the lives of 262 non-Muslims, predominantly Christian, during an attack on his community by armed bandits in 2018.

== Early life and education ==
Abubakar was born in Bauchi, Northern Region, Nigeria, in 1936. He grew up in a religious family and memorized the Qur’an at an early age. As a youth, he was known for his devotion to community service and helping the poor. He trained under prominent Islamic scholars in Bauchi and surrounding areas, gaining knowledge in Islamic jurisprudence, theology, and leadership. This foundation prepared him to become a respected religious leader and mediator in his community.

== Humanitarian leadership ==
Imam Abubakar served as the Chief Imam of Akwatti Mosque in Nghar, a community in the Barkin Ladi local government area of Plateau State. In 2018, Yelwan Gindi Akwati, Swei, and Nghar villages were attacked by suspected bandits, resulting in the deaths of approximately 80 people.

During the attack, Imam Abubakar was able to save the lives of 262 people, predominantly Christians from the Birom tribe in an example of interfaith solidarity, by sheltering them in his mosque while the attackers roamed the villages. He personally negotiated with the assailants to prevent further killings and organized safe evacuation routes for vulnerable residents.

== Recognition ==
Abubakar received international attention for his bravery and humanitarian leadership. He was praised as a symbol of moral courage, interfaith cooperation, and the protection of civilians in conflict situations.

In July 2019, Imam Abdullahi Abubakar received the International Religious Freedom Award from the United States government, which is granted to supporters of religious freedom, together with four other religious leaders from Sudan, Iraq, Brazil, and Cyprus.

In August 2019, President Buhari authorized the inclusion of Imam Abdullahi Abubakar in the membership of the national Ulama committee and was part of an 80-man Ulama committee charged with the responsibility of educating Nigerian pilgrims in Mina during the 2019 Hajj.

== Legacy ==
He played a role in protecting civilians, promoting interreligious dialogue, and leading responses during the 2018 Barkin Ladi attacks.

== Death ==
Abubakar died on 15 January 2026 at a hospital in Jos, Plateau State, after a brief illness, at the age of 90. His death was widely mourned across Nigeria and internationally, with tributes from religious leaders, government officials, and humanitarian organisations.

== Awards ==
- US International Religious Freedom Award (2019)
- Member of the Order of the Federal Republic (MFR)
- Award of Excellence
