= Karina Abdullina =

Kazakhstani singer and actor (born 1976)

- Born: 13 January 1976 (age 50); Almaty, Almaty Region, Kazakhstan
- Genres: pop
- Occupation: Singer
- Instrument: vocals
- Years active: 1993-present

Karina Abrekkyzy Abdullina (Kazakh: Карина Абрекқызы Абдуллина, Karina Abrekqyzy Abdullina; born 13 January 1976) is a Kazakhstani singer and actress.

== Biography ==
Abdullina is a third generation professional musician. Her mother, Olga Lvova, was a well-known pianist, she worked all her life as the leading concert master of the opera house. Her father, Zaur Abdullin was a baritone singer, he graduated from the Moscow Conservatory in the class of Professor Baturin. He sang leading solo parts in operas. Abdullina's grandfather and Zaur's father was Rishat Abdullin who was a baritone and a People's Artist of the USSR. Her granduncle and Rishat's twin brother was Muslim Abdullin (People's Artist of the Kazakh SSR, tenor). Together they were known throughout the country, and were one of the founders of opera in Kazakhstan. At the age of 6, Abdullina entered the Republican Special Music School named after Kulyash Baiseitova, where she studied for 11 years in piano. After school, Karina graduated from Alma-Ata State Conservatory named after Kurmangazy is also a pianist. Repeatedly performed as a soloist with an orchestra, and also as an accompanist with vocalists and instrumentalists. From the age of 14, Abdullina started singing, at the age of 17 she became the winner of the Grand Prix of the All-Union TV contest "The Morning Star " in Moscow. No participant from Kazakhstan could repeat the success of Abdullina in this contest.

== Career ==
Since 1992, Abdullina has been the singer of the popular duet "Musical". She and her guitarist Bulat Syzdykov, became known throughout the CIS. The duet took first place at the international competition for popular music "Big Apple music 96", which is held every year in New York. Almost all the 70 songs from the repertoire of "Musical" are written by Abdullina. There are ten albums released in 2018, including songs in the Kazakh language.

In 2008, Abdullina made her first film. She played the main female role in the Satybaldy Narymbetov's film "Mustafa Shokai".

In 2009, Abdullina published her first book of poems "Dream Girl". The collection included 27 poems, illustrated by her photographs. For this collection, the singer and actress was awarded the prize fund of the first president of the Republic of Kazakhstan. To date, Karina Abdullina is one of the brightest and most talented performers on Kazakhstan's stage. Her songs are performed by many artists, including Russian pop stars. In 2011, Karina Abdullina wrote the words and music of the anthem of the Ministry of Emergency Measures of Russia on the order of the department.

From October to December 2012 Abdullina released 60 author's programs "Non-random encounters" on the Kazakh television channel "Madeniet" (Culture). Also, the singer has released 102 author's programs "Dialogue" on the Kazakhstan radio "Classic" 102.8 FM. Karina Abdullina was visited by such outstanding musicians as pianist Jania Aubakirova, violinist Gaukhar Murzabekova, cellist and conductor Alexander Rudin, composer Gia Kancheli, violinist Oleg Rat and many others.

13 December 2013 in Astana, Kazakhstani President Nursultan Nazarbayev personally presented singer Abdullina honorary title of Honored Worker of the Republic of Kazakhstan. She was awarded this honor for her contribution to the development of culture and art of Kazakhstan.

On 1 February 2014, Abdullina as a member of the duo "Musical" performed the Hymn of the Republic of Kazakhstan in a boxing ring in Monte Carlo before the battle of the Kazakhstan boxing world champion Gennady Golovkin.

In July 2014, Abdullina became the official voice of the national air carrier of Kazakhstan – "Air Astana". The singer voiced all the onboard texts in Kazakh and Russian. It is noteworthy that the representative of the strong half of the duet "Musical" – Bulat Syzdykov, who acted as a sound engineer, took part in the work on the project.

In 2016 "Musical" ceased to exist due to the sudden death of Bulat Syzdykov. Being the author of the majority of songs of the collective, Abdullina continues to perform solo. In February 2018 the singer's album entitled "Come" was released, which included songs in Kazakh, Russian and Armenian.

== Personal life ==
Abdullina first marriage was concluded on 5 March 2004 with the captain of the aircraft, the pilot from Almaty, whom she met 4 years before their wedding, ended in divorce. On 29 August 2007, Karina Abdullina married a second time, this time to Nizami Mammadov, head of the department of national projects of a large Kazakhstani company "Meloman". In 2012, the couple divorced.

On 12 May 2015, Abdullina's son Albert was born. The singer gave birth in the maternity hospital of Private Clinic Almaty. Abdullina is legally married.

== Discography ==
- "The Girl in a White Dress" – 1996
- "Illusion" (cassette) – 1998
- "I will not forget you" – 2000
- "Arman zholdar" (single) – 2001
- "Songs" – 2002 (compilation)
- "Between Almaty and Moscow" – 2003
- "Bitter chocolate" – 2004
- "Arman zholdar" – 2005
- "Musicola. The Best "(CD + DVD) – 2006
- "Arman zholdar" + new song "Kok Orik" (reissue) – 2007
- "Singer and saxophone" (Karina Abdullina's songs performed by other artists) – 2007
- "As always" – 2008
- "Arman zholdar" + 3 new songs (reissue) – 2011
- "Voice of the heart" (Karina Abdullina) – 2012
- "The Spark" – 2013
- "Best songs" (compilation on two CDs) – 2015
- "Deeply in love" (Karina Abdullina) – 2015
- Musicola. Collection (9 CD 1995 -2016) – 2017
- "Come" (Karina Abdullina) – 2018
- "Queen of Sadness" (Karina Abdullina) - 2019
