= Abdullino, Karmaskalinsky District, Bashkortostan =

Abdullino Абдуллино Абдулла Abdulla
- Village
- Location within Bashkortostan Location within Russia
- Coordinates: 54°10′N 56°05′E
- Country: Russia
- Region: Bashkortostan
- District: Karmaskalinsky District
- Time zone: [[UTC+5:00]]

Abdullino (Russian: Абдуллино; Bashkir: Абдулла, Abdulla) is a rural locality (a village) in Starobabichevsky Selsoviet of Karmaskalinsky District, Bashkortostan, Russia. The population was 110 as of 2010. There is 1 street.

== Geography ==
Abdullino is located 23 km south of Karmaskaly (the district's administrative centre) by road. Starobabichevo is the nearest rural locality.

== Ethnicity ==
The village is inhabited by Bashkirs and others.
