= Kamal Aboki =

Nigerian actor and comedian (1997–2023)

- Born: Kamal Iliyasu Usman; January 1, 1997; Kawo, Kano State, Nigeria
- Died: January 16, 2023 (aged 26)
- Occupations: Actor, comedian, skit maker
- Years active: 2011–2023

Kamal Aboki (January 1, 1997 – January 16, 2023) was a Nigerian comedian, actor and skit maker who acted in Hausa language. His name is Kamal Iliyasu but was popularly called Kamal Aboki. His Hausa skits online gave him popularity.

== Personal Life and Death ==
Aboki was born in Kawo of Nassarawa Local Government Area of Kano. Aboki died in a bus accident on January 16, 2023. The 26-year-old entertainer died instantly in a bus accident while returning to Kano from a trip to Maiduguri on Monday . The Tik Toker was buried at Tishama Cemetery in Kano on Tuesday amid tears from colleagues, family members and well-wishers. Bello Mohammed, a friend, colleague and mentor to the late Aboki, in a post on his Instagram page, said the Hausa entertainment industry would miss Aboki. “I can’t hold in my tears because he is one of a kind. His comedy was marvellous and very insightful. We will miss him.”
