= James W. Carey =

American communication theorist (1934–2006)

James William Carey (7 September 1934 – 23 May 2006) was an American communication theorist, media critic, and a journalism instructor at the University of Illinois, and later at Columbia University. He was a member of the Peabody Awards Board of Jurors from 1995 to 2002. He died in 2006 at age 71. Carey is credited with developing the ritual view of communication.

== Communication As Culture (1989) ==
In his 1989 publication, Communication As Culture, James Carey devotes a particularly compelling chapter to a seminal analysis of the telegraph. Carey looks at the telegraph as a means of communication, analysing its historical background, as well as the social and commercial changes that it triggered. In particular, Carey focuses on the way in which the telegraph was able to separate communication and transportation, the telegraph's reconfiguration of time and space, and its effects on ideology and other aspects of social life.

=== Telegraph: Watershed In Connection ===
Carey's focal points in his book Communication As Culture, and more specifically Chapter 8 entitled "Technology and Ideology: The Case of the Telegraph", revolved around the telegraph and its understood role in future developments in communication. The underlining argument in his essay perceives the notion that the telegraph '...permitted for the first time the effective separation of communication from transportation...'. That is, it had become possible for the message to travel faster than people, horses or trains could deliver them', '...the telegraph not only allowed messages to be separated from the physical movement of objects; it also allowed communication to control physical processes actively...'. However, he also remarks that whilst the telegraph was a watershed in communication, it only built on previous frameworks and infrastructure such as foot paths, '...[it] twisted and altered but did not displace patterns of connection formed by natural geography'(p. 204). He further elaborates on the notion with an analogy of the infrastructure of telegraph wires following the physical and natural patterns of geography.

The telegraph facilitated the growth of monopoly capitalism and imperialism, and to a wider extent the de-personalisation of business relations. Before the telegraph most business decisions were made 'face to face', compared with the faster, less personal service provided with its introduction. Indeed, the relationship between merchant to merchant was overnight transformed into one of buyer/seller, and one based on corporate hierarchy, i.e. management. As Chandler remarks, '...the visible hand of management replaced the invisible hand of the market forces where and when new technology...permitted high volume and speed of materials...' (1977).

=== Reconfiguration of Space and Time ===
One of the most significant effects that the telegraph had was that it was able to restructure of time and space, in relation to both social and commercial life. James Carey proficiently explores this concept throughout this chapter, detailing the ways in which the telegraph initiated changes in how one communicates across distances and over time. Carey states that the telegraph made geography irrelevant in relation to communication. The telegraph “allowed symbols to move independently and faster than transportation”.

James Carey focuses heavily on the significant changes that the telegraph has made to society, in relation to the diminishing constraints of space on communication. The insignificance of geography subsequently enabled communities to move away from the local and towards the national, and international or global. The telegraph allowed people from one side of the world to communicate almost instantaneously with someone on the other side of the world. Carey notes the changes that the telegraph has triggered in language and literary style. He points out that due to the cost of sending a telegraph, language and literature transformed into a more concise form. The “telegraph made prose lean and unadorned”, and subsequently separated the readers previously personal connection with the author. No longer, Carey notes, could personal anecdotes or humour be included. He does however mention that the decreasing relevance of space changed language for other reasons as well. Due to the beginnings of globalisation that the telegraph established, language could no longer be localised, or colloquial. As James Carey notes, the telegraph “led to a fundamental change in news”. Literary styles had to become objective in nature, so as it could be read by individuals of all different beliefs and opinions, as well as individuals from many different communities, regions or countries. Carey also notes how this change in the perception of space changed the way that people thought. A new social awareness was apparent, as individuals were able to easily communicate with people over vast distances, who may have very different beliefs or ways of living to their own.

In this work Carey focuses more on the reconfiguration of space as opposed to time; however, he does explain that with space diminishing as an obstacle in communication, time becomes somewhat more important. The existence and use of the telegraph meant that the uncertainty of time in relation to trading, for instance, becomes more relevant than the uncertainty of space. Time was almost ‘expanded’ in a way, as trading time was no longer limited to daylight hours, as one may be trading with someone in another time zone or even in a different hemisphere.

According to James Carey the telegraph initiated communication changes, which reconfigured space and time. He argues this succinctly in Chapter 8 of his book.

== Books ==
- Communication as Culture: Essays on Media and Society, Routledge, New York and London. ISBN 0-415-90725-X
- James Carey: A Critical Reader by Eve Stryker Munson (Editor), Catherine A. Warren (Editor) ISBN 0-8166-2703-7
- Thinking With James Carey: Essays on Communications, Transportation, History by Jeremy Packer (Editor), Craig Robertson (Editor) ISBN 0-8204-7405-3

== Books and articles concerning his ideas ==
Books

- Contemporary consumption rituals: A research anthology., Otnes, C. C., & Lowrey, T. M. (Eds.). (2004). Mahwah, NJ: Lawrence Erlbaum. ISBN 978-0-8058-4779-6

Journals

- The Journey of Ritual Communication, Studies in Communication Sciences 7/1 (2007) 117–138 Zohar Kadmon Sella
- Wedding as text: Communicating cultural identities through ritual. Leeds-Hurwitz, W. (2002). Mahwah, NJ: Lawrence Erlbaum Associates.
- Ritual communication: From everyday conversation to mediated ceremony. Rothenbuhler, E. W. (1998). Thousand Oaks, CA: Sage.
- Ritual and irony: Observations about the discourse of political change in two Germanies. Quarterly Journal of Speech, Knuf, J. (1994). 80, 174–194.
- "Ritual" in organizational culture theory: Some theoretical reflections and a plea for greater terminilogical rigor. Knuf, J. (1993). In S. A. Deetz (Ed.), Communication yearbook 16 (pp. 61–103). Newbury Park, CA: Sage.
- "Spit first and then say what you want!" Concerning the use of language and ancillary codes in ritualized communication, Knuf, J. (1992). Quarterly Journal of Speech, 78, 466–482.
- The role of rituals and fantasy themes in teachers' bargaining. Putnam, L. L., Van Hoeven, S. A., & Bullis, C. A. (1991). Western Journal of Speech Communication, 55, 85–103.
- Reconsidering James Carey: How many rituals does it take to make an artifact?" Marvin, C. (1990, Fall). American Journalism History, 7(4), 216–226.
- Indymedia and The New Net News: Volume 6 Issue 2 2003, Meikle, G (2003). M.C. Journal
