= Hanifa Abdullayev =

Azerbaijani hematologist and health minister

- Hənifə Abdullayev

Minister of Healthcare
- In office 20 January 1970 – 15 June 1979
- Premier: Ali Ibrahimov
- Preceded by: Fakhri Vakilov
- Succeeded by: Talat Gasimov

Personal details
- Born: 7 February 1923 Lankaran, Lenkoran uezd, Azerbaijan SSR, TSFSR, USSR
- Died: 13 March 1991 (aged 68) Baku, Azerbaijan SSR, USSR
- Party: CPSU (1952–1991)

Hanifa Mammadagha oghlu Abdullayev (Azerbaijani: Hənifə Məmmədağa oğlu Abdullayev; 7 February 1923 – 13 March 1991) was an Azerbaijani hematologist who served as the Minister of Healthcare of the Azerbaijan SSR from 1970 to 1979.

== Biography ==
Hanifa Mammadaga oglu Abdullayev was born on 7 February 1923, in the city of Lankaran. In 1942, he graduated from the Lankaran City High School. In 1943, he moved to Baku and was admitted to the Faculty of Automobile Roads at the Azerbaijan Industrial Institute, but after two months, he left his studies and returned to Lankaran. He then enrolled in the Sanitary Faculty of the Azerbaijan State Medical Institute, where he studied for two years.

In 1946, Hanifa Abdullayev moved to Moscow to continue his education at the Second Moscow Medical Institute. He graduated with honors in 1949 and was appointed as a resident at the Surgery Clinic of the USSR Ministry of Health’s Central Institute of Hematology and Blood Transfusion. From 1952 to 1955, he pursued postgraduate education, working first as a junior and then as a senior research fellow. He later became the head of the Planning Department for Science and Education at the Central Institute of Hematology and Blood Transfusion. In 1957, he defended his PhD thesis on "The Study of Blood Prepared Without Stabilizers Under Clinical Conditions."

In 1967, Hanifa Abdullayev was invited to work in Azerbaijan and was elected head of the newly established Department of Hematology and Blood Transfusion at the Azerbaijan State Institute for the Advancement of Doctors. That same year, he defended his doctoral dissertation on "Clinical Treatment of Hemophilia," and a year later, in 1968, he received the title of professor by the Higher Attestation Commission.

In 1970, Hanifa Abdullayev was appointed Minister of Healthcare of the Azerbaijan SSR, a position he held until 1979. From 1979 until the end of his life, he headed the Department of Hematology at the Azerbaijan State Institute for the Advancement of Doctors.

From 1969, Hanifa Abdullayev was a member of the World Hemophilia Association and delivered scientific lectures on hemophilia and thalassemia at medical conferences in the United States, Germany, Turkey, Iran, France, Czechoslovakia, and other countries. He authored numerous scientific works and monographs. His book "Hemophilia" (1973) was well received by health institutions and medical institutes in the Soviet Union.

Hanifa Abdullayev was a member of the Communist Party of the Soviet Union since 1952. He was elected a deputy of the 7th, 8th, and 9th convocations of the Supreme Soviet of the Azerbaijan SSR and was a member of the Central Committee of the Azerbaijan Communist Party. He was awarded the Order of the Red Banner of Labor, the Order of the Badge of Honour, several medals, and the Golden Cross of Hellenic Red Cross.

Hanifa Abdullayev died on 13 March 1991. A street in the city of Lankaran is named after him.
