= Ivan Abdulov =

Soviet Sniper

- Native name: Иван Филиппович Абдулов
- Born: 1922; Shumikha, Novo-Nikolaev governate, RSFSR
- Died: 11 March 1943 (aged 20–21) Liubotyn, Ukrainian SSR, USSR
- Allegiance: Soviet Union
- Branch: Red Army
- Service years: 1941–1943
- Rank: Corporal
- Conflicts: World War II †
- Awards: Hero of the Soviet Union; Order of the Red Star

Ivan Filippovich Abdulov (Russian: Иван Филиппович Абдулов; 1922—11 March 1943) was one of the top Soviet snipers in World War II. Sources vary widely as to his final score; his official award documents indicate at least 298 kills, but many newspapers from the war give higher estimates.

== Early life ==
Abdulov was born in 1922 to a Russian peasant family in Shumikha. After finishing his primary education he worked on a collective farm as a tractor driver before the war.

== World War II ==
After entering the Red Army with his brother Kirill in December 1941 he went to the front. He and his brother developed a reputation for having good sniper skills. On 4 December 1942 he was awarded the Order of the Red Star for killing 112 enemy soldiers. His friends from the war recalled how he liked to go out on a sniper hunt in early morning before the break of dawn. He also trained many other snipers, and was occasionally sent to other regiments to teach their soldiers his sniper techniques. By January he killed 120 more enemy soldiers, some by sniper fire but some by grenades and machine gun fire. During a battle in February he refused to be taken to a medical station despite being badly wounded, insisting on helping evacuate other wounded soldiers. On 11 March 1943 he was killed in action during an intense battle in Ukraine. After his commander was killed he led his fellow soldiers in an offensive, taking out two enemy tanks with anti-tank grenades and killing 35 enemies with a machine gun. On 26 October 1943 he was posthumously awarded the title Hero of the Soviet Union. His final score as a sniper remains unclear. His award sheets credit him with 298 kills in defensive battles, although it does not specify which ones were sniper kills and which were by other means. At least five of his kills were of enemy snipers. A frontline newspaper said he killed 352 enemies, but a book published in 1996 credits him with killing 375 enemies. One book said he killed 428 Nazis.
