= Abdusalom Abdullayev =

Tajikistani artist and cinematographer

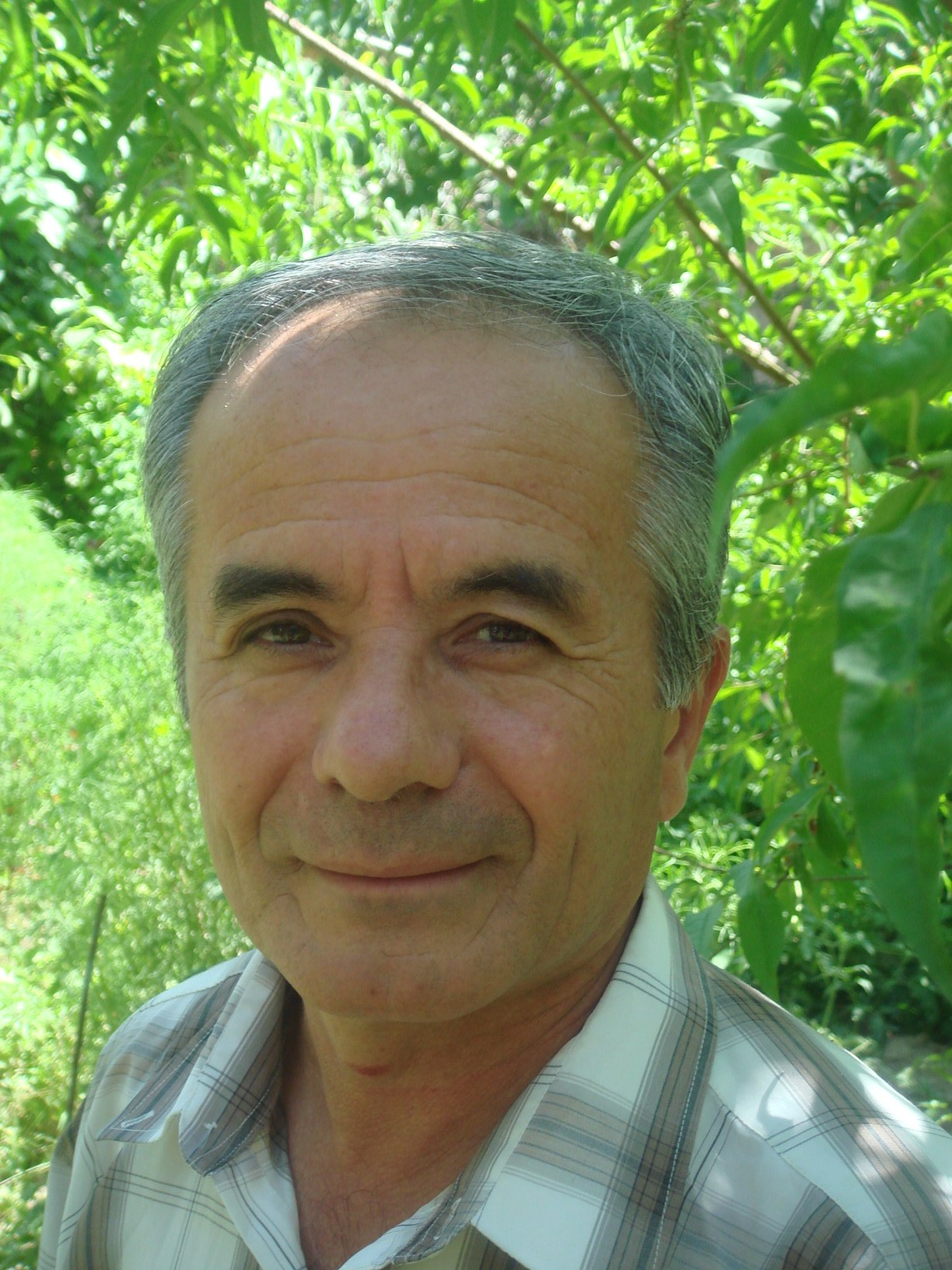
Abdusalom Abdullayev

Abdusalom Abdullayev (Tajik: Абдусалом Абдуллоев, Persian: عبدالسلام عبدالله‌اف, 15 December 1951 Kanibadam, Tajikistan) is a Tajikistani artist and cinematographer. From 1976 to 1992, he worked as an art director and production designer of the “Tajikfilm” studio, working on over 20 films.
