= Ritual view of communication =

The ritual view of communication is a communications theory proposed by James W. Carey, wherein communication–the construction of a symbolic reality–represents, maintains, adapts, and shares the beliefs of a society in time. In short, the ritual view conceives communication as a process that enables and enacts societal transformation.

Carey defines the ritual view particularly in terms of sharing, participation, association, and fellowship. In addition, Carey acknowledges that, commonness, communion, and community, naturally correspond with the ritual view. In a similar way, the term "ritual" holds religious connotations. For Carey, this connection to religion helps to emphasize the concept of shared beliefs and ceremony that are fundamental to the ritual view.

In contrast to the ritual view, Carey presents what he considers the more commonly recognized "transmission" view of communication. In the transmission view the dissemination of information constitutes the primary goal. Carey defines the transmission view in terms of imparting, sending, transmitting and giving information to others. In the transmission view information is disseminated across geography largely for the purpose of control. To support this idea, Carey refers to the messaging systems of ancient Egypt wherein, "transportation and communication were inseparably linked" and served as a method of control.

The transmission view emphasizes the conscious role of agents seeking to influence an audience. Hence it highlights the power being exercised by those who create the media message upon those who receive it. In the classical formulation of Harold Lasswell, communication was about “who says what to whom through what channels and with what effect.” In part, the transmission perspective conceives of communication as a linear, causal process, typically from centralized media producers to distributed audiences, and it abstracts this communication from the broader sets of social institutions and cultural traditions.

In contrast, for Carey a ritual view embeds the communication process in the broader sets of cultural traditions and social relations. It conceives of the communication rite as part of a broad cultural dialogue that largely reiterates preexisting cultural traditions, a not entirely conscious communal process. Here communication is a more horizontal process within a community, in contrast to the more vertical relationship in the transmission view. In the ritual perspective, communication binds the community together across time, while in the transmission view, communication serves to increase the power of those in control over an expanded space.

Where Carey seemingly presents these two views as oppositional, he acknowledges that the dichotomy is false, or more accurately, the distinction is an analytical one. He states, "neither of these counterpoised views of communication necessarily denies what the other affirms". Instead, they offer a nuanced perspective of communication that enables a broader understanding of human interaction.

== Approach to Communication ==
In academic studies of communication, Carey’s ritual theory has been applied as a theoretical framework to family stories; undergraduate studies; business practices; computer technologies; and criminal behaviour. More broadly, Carey’s theory has been applied to theology, advertising, sociology, anthropology, and geography.

Yet, Carey himself was inspired and influenced by a number of well-known philosophers and theorists, in particular, John Dewey, Harold Innis, and Marshall McLuhan. In his essay, A Cultural Approach to Communication, Carey references the writings of philosopher and psychologist John Dewey, to explore the complexities of, and draw out the contradictions for, the term "communication". James W. Carey then delineates communication into two main views, ritual and transmission. In fact, Dewey’s work informs Carey’s own use of the prepositions "of" and "for", creating distinctions in their usage.

Moreover, Carey’s ritual and transmission view of communication, as Adam writes, draw largely from what Harold Innis implied in his work. Specifically, that media influences and contributes to the fabric of society, and its maintenance over the course of time relies on dissolution of the tensions in communication, that is its ritual and transmission forms. In A Cultural Approach to Communication, Carey also references Marshall McLuhan’s assertion that, "the one thing of which the fish is unaware is water." In so doing, James W. Carey supports the concept of "the symbolic production of reality", or what humans engage in, often unconsciously, as part of daily life, which forms the foundation for both of the ritual and the transmission views of communication. For James W. Carey, it is necessary for "us" to become aware of our symbolic reality, to better understand communication, and ultimately reshape common culture.

== Newspapers, social media and the ritual view ==
In order to elaborate on his ritual view, and specifically its religious connotations, Carey uses an example of mass media, the newspaper. In this case, Carey likens newspaper reading to attending mass. He states, "attending mass, [is] a situation in which nothing new is learned but in which a particular view of the world is portrayed and confirmed." The ritual act, then, becomes part of a shared culture, and according to the ritual view is maintained through time.

Carey details human interaction with newspapers to add another dimension to the ritual view, specifically drama. Carey asserts that readers "engage in a continual shift of roles or of dramatic focus", when they read through a newspaper. Carey continues, that, "though news changes little…it is habitually consumed." In this way, the ritual view of communication is concerned with the presentation of reality in a particular moment in time, and how individuals interact and share in it.

Certainly newspapers have long been conceptualized in terms of community. For example, in his book Newspaper Use and Community Ties, Keith R. Stamm examines the relationship between individuals and newspapers in detail, relying on the works of Park, Janowitz, Robert, and Merton. Yet, in the past few decades, newspapers, in their printed format, have experienced a steady decline in readership. In response, a large majority of newspapers now host online versions. This ongoing movement towards digital formats raises questions surrounding the changing relationship of individuals and newspapers. For instance, what becomes of the communities newspapers have long sustained? How does Carey’s ritual view of communication apply today?

Although printed newspapers continue to retain readership owing, in large part, to the trustworthiness and insightfulness of content perceived by readers, digitized newspapers surpass the printed format in terms of immediacy and geography. They also incorporate an additional dimension for connectedness, particularly through social media. Yet, the relationship between social media and newspapers is multi-layered and complex. Indeed, the relationship between the two requires further exploration in order to better understand the potential effect of social media on newspapers. However, since social media encompasses multiple platforms, it may be necessary to focus on a specific social media, for instance Twitter.

In reference to Carey’s ritual view of communication Twitter enables the establishment, transformation, and maintenance of societal interaction. For example, Twitter involves both sharing and participation, by way of "tweets", and association and fellowship, by way of "following". At the same time, Twitter users engage in a somewhat ritualized way through the act of "following" particular organizations, individuals, or interests. Moreover, in "following" specific groups or persons Twitter users form "online communities."

=== Ideas of community ===
In "Communication as Culture", James W. Carey explains that with the dawn of the electric age the futurist ethos attributed electric technology with, among other things, the rebirth of community. Indeed, the futurist ethos was not far wrong. The advent of the Internet, a product of electric technology, has redefined community, particularly in terms of its global scale. To that end, Twitter is conceptualized as an online, global community. However, community exists only to the extent of the shared beliefs of Twitter users. That is, users are not a unified, cohesive group, rather a collective of individuals with often contrasting perspectives, seeking to find those who share their specific views. Similarly, individuals "hunt and gather [the news] they want when they want it," often via social media, including Twitter. An example of this is explored in "Dynamic Debates: An Analysis of Group Polarization Over Time on Twitter". The study looks at the interactions of advocates and critics of abortion on Twitter, focusing largely on the tweets occurring several hours and days following the death of late-term abortion doctor George Tiller. The study concludes that both pro-life and pro-choice supporters primarily interacted with like-minded individuals, that is, fellow supporters of either side of the abortion issue. Not only did each group seek to affirm already established beliefs, they also vehemently argued with dissidents.
