= Abdugani Abdullayev =

Uzbek woodcarver

- Born: June 25, 1953; Fergana region, Uzbek SSR, USSR
- Died: December 18, 2017 (aged 64); Tashkent, Uzbekistan
- Occupation: Woodcarver
- Years active: 1973–2017

Abdugani Abdullayev (born June 25, 1953, Fergana Region, Uzbek SSR, USSR – December 18, 2017, Tashkent, Uzbekistan) was a master woodcarver at the Kokand Artistic Production Enterprise of the Republican Creative Association "Usto". He was awarded the title of People's Master of Uzbekistan in 1999 and was honored as a Hero of Uzbekistan in 2006.

== Biography ==
He was born in 1953 in the Fergana Region. Abdugani Abdullaev's parents were craftsmen. His first major project involved crafting over 20 carved doors, gates, and fences for the Olim Khodjaev Theater building. Since 1973, he participated in international exhibitions showcasing his artworks both in Uzbekistan and abroad. From 1983, he worked as a woodcarver, creating columns, doors, gates, and fences adorned with intricate Islamic carvings for various public buildings, such as the Mubarak Restaurant, Karshi Theater, and others. He led woodcarving work in the Imam al-Bukhari complex and, together with his students, created ivans and hauzes, skillfully decorating them in accordance with Uzbek traditions. He was involved in woodcarving during the restoration of the mausoleums of Bahauddin Naqshband (Bukhara region) and Imam Bukhari (Samarkand region), as well as in the construction of the Museum of Repression Victims (Tashkent), the Memory Alley complex, and the Burkhaniddin Margiloni complex (Fergana region).

Abdugani Abdullaev focused on restoring unique disappearing patterns and introduced new styles into practice. In 1999, he was awarded the title of People's Master of the Republic of Uzbekistan. On August 25, 2006, he was honored with the title "Hero of Uzbekistan".

Abdugani Abdullaev died on December 18, 2017, in Tashkent.
