= Tamilla Abdullayeva =

Azerbaijani theater actress

Tamilla Abdullayeva Tamella Abdullayeva
- Born: December 10, 1943 (age 81); Tovuz, Azerbaijan SSR, USSR
- Occupation: Actress
- Years active: 1965
- Awards: Honored Artist of the Azerbaijan

Tamilla (Tamella) Islam gizi Abdullayeva (Azerbaijani: Tamilla (Tamella) İslam qızı Abdullayeva, born December 10, 1943) is an Azerbaijani theater actress, People's Artiste of Azerbaijan.

== Biography ==
Tamilla Abdullayeva was born on December 10, 1943, in Tovuz. She studied at the secondary school in Tovuz, in 1961–1965 she studied at the faculty of drama and film acting of Azerbaijan State Theater Institute.

Tamilla Abdullayeva began her stage career at the Azerbaijan State Theatre of Young Spectators, and worked here in 1965–1967. In 1967, when the Yerevan State Azerbaijan Drama Theater was restored after a long break, she began to operate in that theater. In connection with the relocation of the theater in 1988, she continued her activity at the Azerbaijan State Theatre of Musical Comedy, where she worked until 1995, and in 1995–1999 she worked at the Bashir Miniature Theater. In 1999, she started working at the Yerevan State Azerbaijan Drama Theater again.

== Awards ==
- People's Artiste of Azerbaijan — October 16, 2007
- Honored Artist of the Azerbaijan SSR — November 24, 1978
- "Theater figure" Gold medal — 2007

== Literature ==
- Rəhimli, İ. (2017). Azərbaycan Teatr Ensiklopediyası (3 cilddə). Vol. 3-cü cild. Bakı: Azərnəşr. 416 səh. ISBN 978-5-86874-179-1.
- "A – Argelander". National Encyclopedia of Azerbaijan. Vol. 1. Baku: AMEA "Azərbaycan Milli Ensiklopediyası" Elmi Mərkəzi. 2009. p. 608. ISBN 978-9952-441-02-4.
