= Abu Abdallah Mohammed Amghar =

Maghrebi Sufi saint

- Major shrine: El Jadida
- Patronage: Tit

Moulay Abu Abdallah Mohammed Amghar (Arabic: أبو عبد الله محمد أمغار) (ca 1060) was a Sufi saint during the reign of the Almoravid dynasty and the founder of the Taifa Sanhajiya, the earliest example of a Sufi order in the Maghrib. He is also the patron saint of Tit, a small village 12 kilometers from El Jadida (in present-day Morocco).
