= Denis Abdullin =

Russian ice hockey player (born 1985)

- Born: January 1, 1985 (age 40); Magnitogorsk, Russia
- Height: 6 ft 1 in (185 cm)
- Weight: 198 lb (90 kg; 14 st 2 lb)
- Position: Forward
- Shot: Left
- Played for: Molot-Prikamie Perm; Traktor Chelyabinsk; Lada Togliatti; Metallurg Magnitogorsk; Neftekhimik Nizhnekamsk; HC MVD; Amur Khabarovsk; Avtomobilist Yekaterinburg; Ak Bars Kazan; HC Vityaz
- Playing career: 2005–2017

Denis Abdullin (born January 1, 1985) is a Russian former professional ice hockey forward. He played in the Kontinental Hockey League (KHL).

Abdullin played the 2010–11 KHL season with Metallurg Magnitogorsk.
