= Ahmed Aboki Abdullahi =

Brigadier General of the Nigerian army

- Born: Nigeria
- Occupation: Brigadier General

Ahmed Aboki Abdullahi is a retired Brigadier General of the Nigerian army. As a Lieutenant Colonel, he was the Nigerian communications minister, a position he earned as a trained officer in the army signals division. He was at one point in time a general commanding officer. He is thought of as belonging to the group that supported the palace coup of General Sani Abacha in 1993.
