= Imperial Inspectorate Organization =

Iran's supreme investigative body (1958–1962; 1968–1979)

The Imperial Inspectorate Organization (Persian: سازمان بازرسی شاهنشاهی, also known as the Shah's Inspection) was the supreme investigative body of Iran. It was established by imperial decree on October 11, 1958, as an instrument "to investigate public complaints regarding bribery, embezzlement, and other abuses by government officials and agencies." It was established by imperial decree on October 11, 1958, as an instrument "to investigate public complaints regarding bribery, embezzlement, and other abuses by government officials and agencies."

The organization possessed virtually unlimited powers to conduct on-site inspections of any administrative or military organization at any level and anywhere in the country. The Shah's Inspection was not subordinate to the Majlis, the Rastakhiz Party, the government, the police, or the armed forces—it was accountable only to the Shah. Furthermore, it was authorized to monitor the work and activities of the secret police, SAVAK.

== Formation ==
The establishment of the Imperial Inspectorate Organization was shaped by the context and factors primarily associated with the events and aftermath of the 1953 Iranian coup d'état.

The prevalence of corruption, particularly within the bureaucracy, internal unrest, and the ruling regime's fear of coups and opposition sabotage plans—along with the necessity of monitoring various regions of the country and controlling the activities of the bureaucracy, foreign agents, and the infiltration of spies into Iran's security and intelligence agencies—provided the basis for Mohammad Reza Pahlavi to issue the order for the creation of an inspection organization. After the overthrow of Mohammad Mosaddegh, the Shah concentrated real power in his hands and utilized various means to maximize control over society and the government. One of the most important of these measures was the creation of such an institution to remain informed of events and the internal situation in the shortest possible time and without additional administrative actions.

Thus, as a result of all these conditions, the Shah issued a decree in 1958, during the cabinet of Manouchehr Eghbal, to create an organization with the following task:

"To consider the complaints of the people against government departments and government officials, including civil, military, and judicial, as well as municipalities and state enterprises, all or part of whose capital belongs to the government, we consider it necessary to form an organization named the 'Imperial Inspectorate Organization.' Complaints and claims received by us must be processed, and the result must be reported to us as soon as possible."

Following the issuance of the imperial decree, the organization began its operations with broad powers under the leadership of General Morteza Yazdanpanah, a military figure from the era of Reza Shah. The Imperial Inspectorate Organization was established in October 1958, and shortly thereafter, the charter and powers of the organization were regulated in eight articles and approved on December 23, 1958.

== Functions ==
The organization reported directly to the Shah, and was initially headed by General Hossein Fardoust, a childhood friend of Mohammad Reza Pahlavi. In just nine months, the Shah's Inspection received approximately 39,000 complaints from the public, and during its first year of operation, it "received 52,000 complaints and dismissed 424 officials".. The Imperial Inspectorate Organization monitored the progress of administrative work and conducted sudden random inspections of government ministries and agencies.

During the initial period of the Shah's Inspection, the government began taking more active steps to combat corruption. The organization uncovered the involvement of a number of high-ranking officials in scams related to contract work and the trading of land plots for urban development. In 1958, a law was passed prohibiting civil servants, members of parliament (including those who were lawyers by profession), and government members from participating in state contract deals.

In March 1959, a law came into effect requiring periodic censuses of the income and property of all civil servants and military personnel. Based on these laws, several high-ranking figures were imprisoned, including the Chief of the General Staff. In June 1977, a special decree expanded the organization's powers to conduct provincial on-site inspections.

== Abolition and Re-establishment ==
In 1962, Prime Minister Ali Amini, aiming to reduce the size of the state bureaucracy as part of his austerity policy, abolished the Shah's Inspection, but it was re-established several years later. Resolutions by the Iran Novin Party and the Congress on Administrative Revolution recommended the creation of an organization to handle citizens' complaints against officials and the administration.

Resolutions by the Iran Novin Party and the Congress on Administrative Revolution recommended the creation of an organization to handle citizens' complaints against officials and the administration. The Congress also insisted that this organization remain under the control of the Shah. On the day the Congress resolution was approved (February 7), the Shah promised to restore the "Imperial Inspectorate Organization" in the near future and grant it broader powers for investigation and even "providing prompt solutions" to public complaints and problems. On May 31, the National Consultative Assembly (Parliament) approved the bill for the establishment of the inspection organization.

The organization was re-established on June 2, 1968, in accordance with a new law. While the original "Shah's Inspection" had been created by monarchical decree, the new inspection organization was established based on a special act of Parliament. The law defined this body as the "General Inspection Administration of the Ministry of Justice". Another goal of the organization was to improve the image of the monarchy and the authority of the Shah in the eyes of the population.

Under the law, the Organization was authorized to appoint its staff from among active or retired civil servants and army officers. Additionally, it was permitted to form special groups of inspectors to investigate financial irregularities and was granted the right to temporarily suspend government officials from their positions.

The organization's staff was small, and its budget amounted to $11 million. Also on June 2, Lieutenant General Morteza Yazdanpanah [who had also headed the original Shah's Inspection from 1958 to 1962] was appointed head of the new Inspection Organization. and immediately began personnel recruitment

In 1972, General Hossein Fardoust became the new head of the "Shah's Inspection," under whom the inspectorate was substantially reorganized, and the scope of the organization's activities significantly exceeded the Yazdanpanah period.

== After the Revolution ==
The Shah's Inspection was abolished following the victory of the 1979 Islamic Revolution. The new authorities established the "Islamic Inspectorate Organization" on its foundation.

== Heads of the Imperial Inspectorate Organization ==
- Lieutenant General Morteza Yazdanpanah (1958–1962; 1968–1970);
- General Hossein Fardoust (1970–1979).

== Bibliography ==
- Journal of Constitutional and Parliamentary Studies (1973). "Journal of Constitutional and Parliamentary Studies". Journal of Constitutional and Parliamentary Studies. 7. Institute of Constitutional and Parliamentary Studies: 176. Archived from the original on 2021-07-25.
- Aurang, M. (August–September 1968). "Eye and Ear of Mehr or Imperial Inspection Organization". Armaghan Magazine (in Persian). 37 (5–6): 275–276.
- Department of State (December 19, 1977). "The Department of State Bulletin". The Department of State Bulletin. 77 (2008). U.S. Department of State: 895.
- U.S. Government (1976). Human Rights in Iran: Hearings Before the Subcommittee on International Organizations of the Committee on International Relations. U.S. Government Printing Office. p. 29.
- Adinehvand, Masoud (2017). "Faraz va forud-e sazman-e bazresi-ye shahanshahy az Yazdanpanah ta Fardoust [The Rise and Fall of the Imperial Inspectorate Organization from Yazdanpanah to Fardoust]". Iran Online (in Persian). Iran Institute.
- Vydavateľstvo (1985). "Asian and African Studies". Asian and African Studies. 21. Vydavateľstvo Slovenskej akadémie vied: 315. Archived from the original on 2021-07-25.
- Laing, Margaret (1977). The Shah. United Kingdom: Sidgwick & Jackson. p. 263. ISBN 978-0283983368.
- Dishon, Daniel (1968). Middle East Record: 1968. Transaction Publishers. p. 920. ISBN 978-0878551675.
- Collier (1969). Collier's Encyclopedia 1969 Yearbook, Covering the Year 1968. Crowell-Collier Educational Corp. p. 650.
- Subramaniam, V. (1990). Public Administration in the Third World: An International Handbook. Greenwood. p. 456. ISBN 978-0313247309.
- Agayev, S. L. (1981). Iran v proshlom i nastoyashchem: puti i formy revolyutsionnogo protsessa [Iran in the Past and Present: Paths and Forms of the Revolutionary Process] (in Russian). Moscow: Nauka. p. 269.
- Arabajyan, A. Z. (1976). Iran: Ocherki noveyshey istorii [Iran: Essays on Modern History] (in Russian). Moscow: Nauka. p. 470.
- Wilber, Donald N. (1963). Contemporary Iran. Praeger. p. 224.
- Graham, Robert (1980). Iran: The Illusion of Power. St. Martin's Press. ISBN 978-0312435882.
- Iran Almanac (1969). Iran Almanac and Book of Facts, 1969. Echo of Iran. p. 790.
- Dishon, Daniel (1973). Middle East Record. Vol. 4. Israel Universities Press. p. 920. ISBN 978-0706512700.
