= Nafisa Abdullaeva =

Uzbek lawyer (born 1978)

- Born: Nafisa Abdullaeva; 13 August 1978; Tashkent, Uzbek SSR
- Occupations: Lawyer, Business coach, Writer, Poet

Nafisa Abdullaeva is an Uzbek lawyer, business scholar, textbook author, writer, and poet. She was a consultant to the Uzbek Senate and was involved in legislative processes in Uzbekistan.

== Education ==
Abdullaeva holds an MA in International Relations and Politics from Brunel University (2019), PhD in law from the Tashkent State Judicial Institute (2008), and an MA (2002) and BA (1998) in International Law from the University of World Economy and Diplomacy.

== Career ==
Abdullaeva's main activities concern business and the law. She is a well-known consultant for the Republic of Uzbekistan in organizational and business management. She has worked in different projects in UNDP, UNODC, ADB, EuropeAID, AIFC in Uzbekistan, Kazakhstan, and the UK.

She was the head of the Department of the School of Business at the Cabinet of Ministers of Uzbekistan Abdullayeva was the director of the law firm Lex Mark Advokat, which specialized in cross-border transactions, Uzbek corporate commercial legislation advisory, as well as insurance and reinsurance topics.

She has authored one textbook and more than 30 other publications on legal topics in Uzbekistan and the UK.

Abdullaeva also founded Darmon (a medical magazine) and the training center Lead Consulting. Her other activities include hosting the program Book Tashkent. She also chaired the Audit Committee of Uzbekistan for rugby.
