= Miroj Abdulloyev =

Taijik politician (1948–2026)

- Мироҷ Абдуллоев
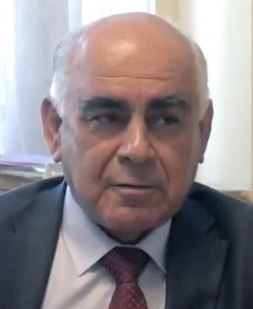
- Abdulloyev in 2020

Chairman of the Communist Party of Tajikistan
- In office 22 April 2017 – 7 April 2026
- Preceded by: Mirzoazim Nasimov (acting)

Personal details
- Born: Mirojiddin Sanonovich Abdulloyev; 15 August 1948 Mu'minobod District, Khatlon Region, Tajik SSR, USSR
- Died: 7 April 2026 (aged 77)
- Party: CPT
- Education: Pedagogical College; Academy of the Interior Ministry of the Soviet Union

Mirojiddin Sanonovich Abdulloyev (Tajik: Мироҷиддин Санонович Абдуллоев), known as Miroj Abdulloyev (15 August 1948 – 7 April 2026), was a Tajik politician who was the Chairman of the Communist Party of Tajikistan, succeeding acting chairman Mirzoazim Nasimov on 22 April 2017, following the removal of long serving party leader Shodi Shabdolov in 2016.

== Life and career ==
Miroj Abdulloyev was born in the village of Langar-kalon in the Mu'minobod District of Khatlon province on 15 August 1948. He graduated from the Pedagogical College in Kulob in 1966 and the Academy of the Interior Ministry of the Soviet Union in Moscow in 1984. From 1984 to 1991, he worked with the Tajik Interior Ministry's office for the Kulob region. From June 1999 to 2005, Abdulloyev headed the drug control agency's office for Khatlon province. From October 2016 to 11 March 2017, he was head of the CPT organization for the Kulob region in Khatlon province. On 11 March 2017, Abdulloyev was elected Secretary of the CPT Central Committee.

Abdulloyev died on 7 April 2026, at the age of 77.
