= Bolsheustyikinskoye =

Bolsheustyikinskoye Большеустьикинское
- Selo

Other transcription(s)
  - Bashkir: Оло Ыҡтамаҡ
- Interactive map of Bolsheustyikinskoye
- Location of Bolsheustyikinskoye Bolsheustyikinskoye (Bashkortostan)
- Coordinates: 55°56′43″N 58°16′05″E
- Country: Russia
- Federal subject: Bashkortostan
- Administrative district: Mechetlinsky District
- SelsovietSelsoviet: Bolsheustyikinsky
- Founded: 1800

Population (2010 Census)
  - Total: 6,397
  - Estimate (2010): 7,839 (+22.5%)

Administrative status
  - Capital of: Mechetlinsky District, Bolsheustyikinsky Selsoviet

Municipal status
  - Municipal district: Mechetlinsky Municipal District
  - Rural settlement: Bolsheustyikinsky Selsoviet Rural Settlement
  - Capital of: Mechetlinsky Municipal District, Bolsheustyikinsky Selsoviet Rural Settlement
- Time zone: UTC+5 (MSK+2)
- Postal code: 452550
- OKTMO ID: 80642415101

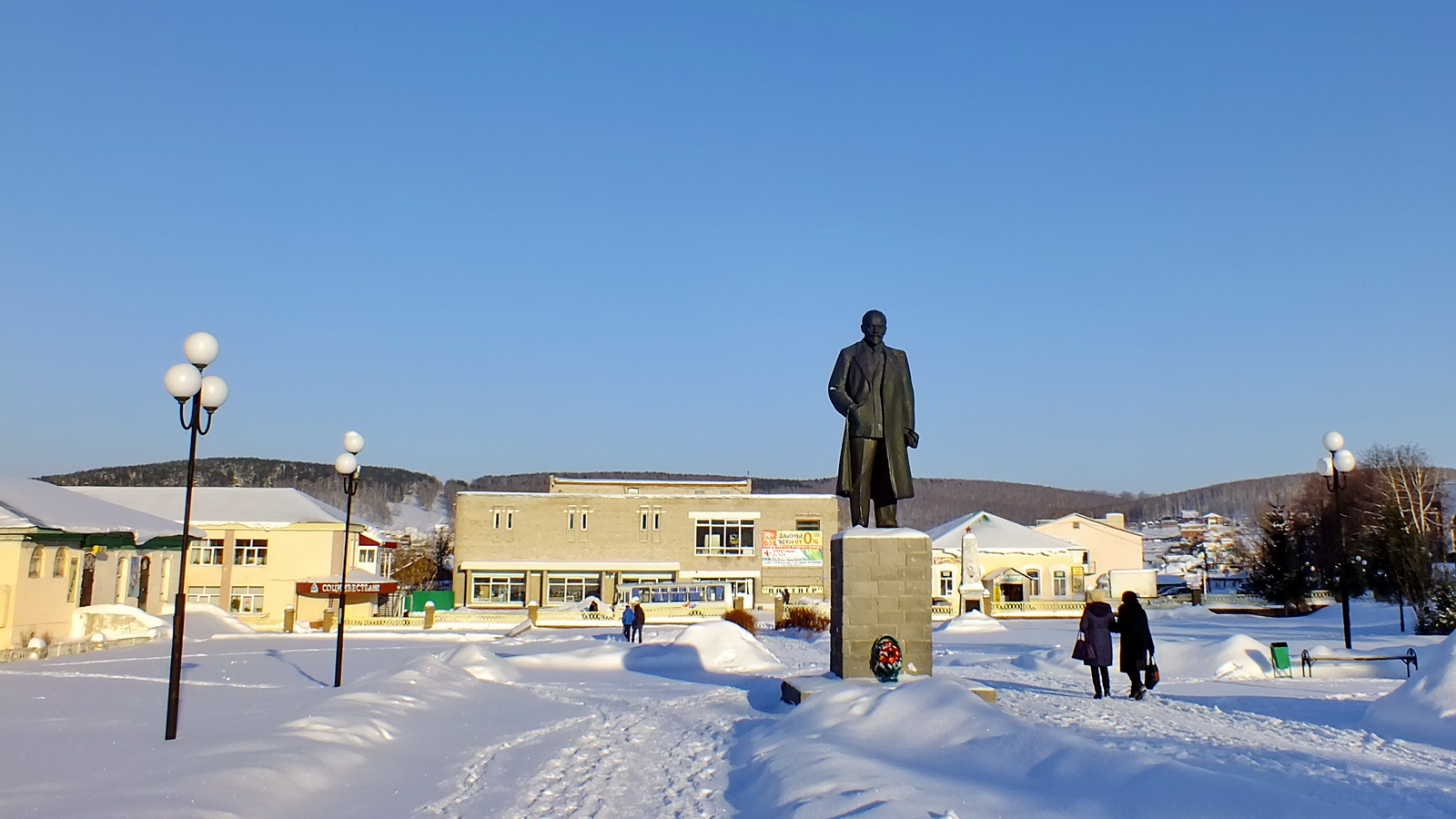
Lenin monument at the main square.

Bolsheustyikinskoye (Russian: Большеустьики́нское; Bashkir: Оло Ыҡтамаҡ, Olo Iqtamaq) is a rural locality (a selo) and the administrative centre of Mechetlinsky District in Bashkortostan, Russia. It is located near the Ay River. Population: 6,397 (2010 census);
