= Mechetlinsky District =

Mechetlinsky District Мечетлинский район (Russian)
- District

Other transcription(s)
  - Bashkir: Мәсетле районы
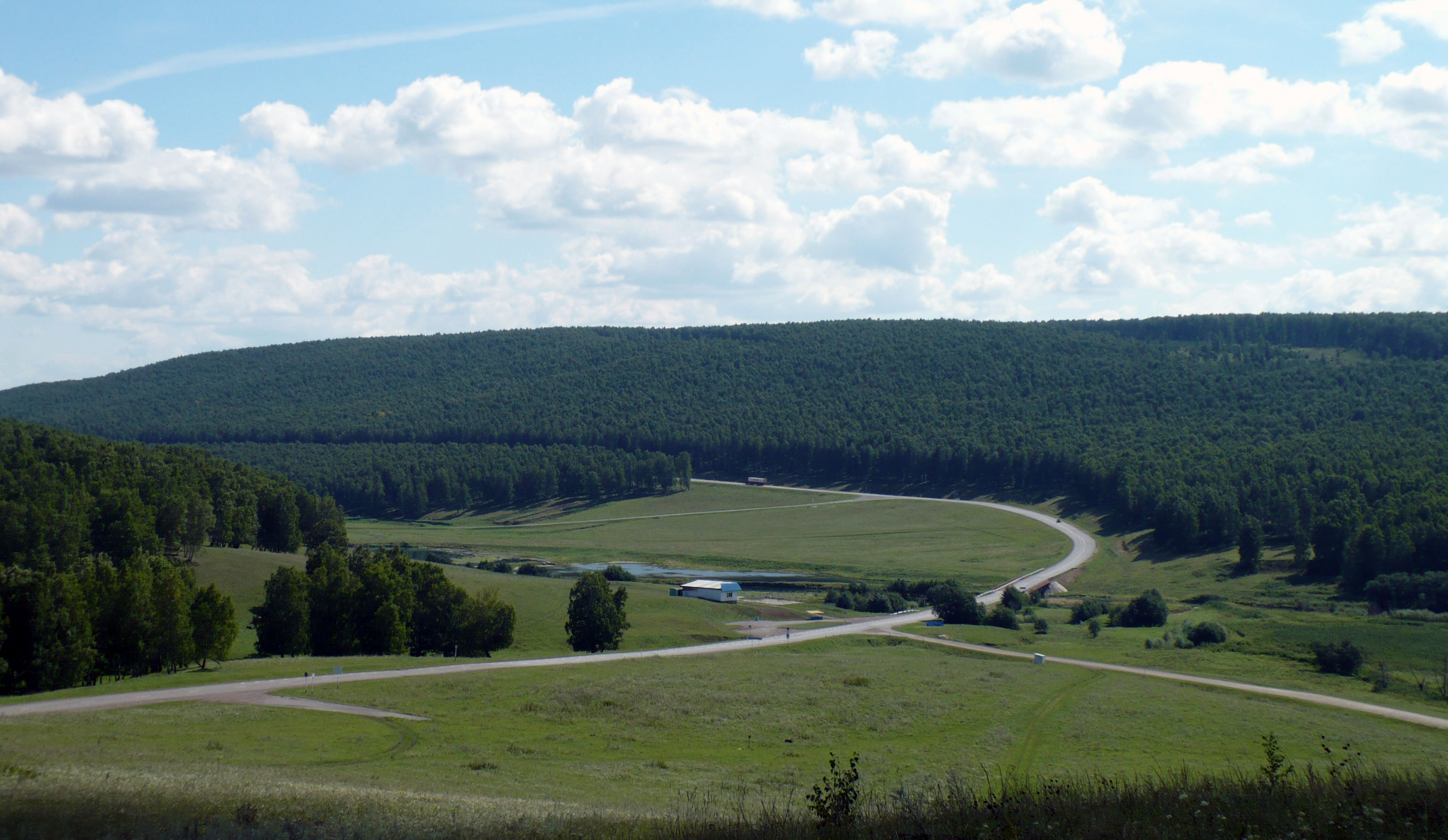
- P-350 Near Lemez-Tamak, Mechetlinsky District

- Flag Coat of arms
- Location of Mechetlinsky District in the Republic of Bashkortostan
- Coordinates: 55°57′N 58°16′E
- Country: Russia
- Federal subject: Republic of Bashkortostan
- Established: August 20, 1930
- Administrative center: Bolsheustyikinskoye

Area
  - Total: 1,557 km^{2} (601 sq mi)

Population (2010 Census)
  - Total: 25,032
  - Estimate (2018): 22,706 (−9.3%)
  - Density: 16.08/km^{2} (41.64/sq mi)
  - Urban: 0%
  - Rural: 100%

Administrative structure
  - Administrative divisions: 12 Selsoviets
  - Inhabited localities: 49 rural localities

Municipal structure
  - Municipally incorporated as: Mechetlinsky Municipal District
  - Municipal divisions: 0 urban settlements, 12 rural settlements
- Time zone: UTC+5 (MSK+2)
- OKTMO ID: 80642000
- Website: https://mechetly.bashkortostan.ru/

Population of Mechetlinsky District
- 2010 Census: 25,032
- 2002 Census: 25,604
- 1989 Census: 23,716
- 1979 Census: 25,492

Mechetlinsky District (Russian: Мечетли́нский райо́н; Bashkir: Мәсетле районы, Mäsetle rayonı) is an administrative and municipal district (raion), one of the fifty-four in the Republic of Bashkortostan, Russia. It is located in the northeast of the republic and borders with Sverdlovsk Oblast in the north, Belokataysky District in the east, Kiginsky District in the southeast, and with Duvansky District in the south and west. The area of the district is 1,556.67 square kilometers (601.03 sq mi). Its administrative center is the rural locality (a selo) of Bolsheustyikinskoye. As of the 2010 Census, the total population of the district was 25,032, with the population of Bolsheustyikinskoye accounting for 31.3% of that number.

== History ==
The district was established on August 20, 1930.

== Administrative and municipal status ==
Within the framework of administrative divisions, Mechetlinsky District is one of the fifty-four in the Republic of Bashkortostan. The district is divided into twelve selsoviets, comprising forty-nine rural localities. As a municipal division, the district is incorporated as Mechetlinsky Municipal District. Its twelve selsoviets are incorporated as twelve rural settlements within the municipal district. The selo of Bolsheustyikinskoye serves as the administrative center of both the administrative and municipal district.
