= Abdullah (name) =

Abd Allah
- Pronunciation: [ʕɑbˈdɑl.lɑ, ʕæb-, -ˈdel.læ, ʕabdulˈɫaː]
- Gender: Male
- Language: Arabic

Origin
- Meaning: Servant of God

Other names
- Variant forms: Abdallah, Abdellah, Abdollah, Abdullah and many others
- Related names: Hebrew: Abdiel, Obadiah and Ovadia

Abd Allah (Arabic: عبد الله, romanized: ʻAbd Allāh), also spelled Abdullah, Abdhullah, Abdellah, Abdollah, Abdallah, Abdulla, Abdalla and many others, is an Arabic theophoric name meaning servant of God or "God's follower". It is built from the Arabic words ʻabd (عبد) and Allāh (الله).

Although the first letter "a" in Allāh, as the first letter of the article al-, is usually unstressed in Arabic, it is usually stressed in the pronunciation of this name. The variants Abdollah and Abdullah represent the elision of this "a" following the "u" of the Classical Arabic nominative case (pronounced [o] in Persian).

Humility before God is an essential value of Islam, hence Abdullah is a common name among Muslims. The name of the Islamic prophet Muhammad's father was Abdullah. As the prophet's father died before his birth, this indicates that the name was already in use in pre-Islamic Arabia.

It is also common among Mizrahi Jews and Sephardic Jews, especially Iraqi Jews and Syrian Jews. Among the latter, the name holds historical significance in Sephardic communities, particularly those from Aleppo, Syria, where the variant "Abdalla" was traditionally used as a surname. The name is cognate to, and has the same meaning as, the Hebrew Abdiel, Obadiah and also, Ovadia, which are name variations of the prophet Obadiah, known in Islam as Dhu'l-Kifl. A notable bearer was Abdallah Somekh (1813–1889), who was an influential Sephardic rabbi in Ottoman Iraq. Two Jewish rabbis were present in Medina before the advent of Islam: Abdullah ibn Salam and Abdullah ibn Saba. Ovadia Yosef, the former Sephardic Chief Rabbi of Israel, was born Abdalla Youssef.

The variant used in the Russian language is "Абдулла́" (Abdulla) (cf. Fedul, which has similar origins), with "Абду́л" (Abdul) and "Габдулла́" (Gabdulla) often used in Adyghe. The Spanish variant is Abdala. The Turkic Tatar language spells it as Ğabdulla (Габдулла).

The Christian Arabic Bible uses the word Allah for God. Presently in the Middle East, the name is sometimes used by Christians as a given or family name.

== Given name ==
=== Abd Allah ===
- Abd Allah ibn Muhammad (611–613), son of Muhammad
- Abd Allah ibn Uthman (620–625), son of third caliph Uthman
- Abd Allah ibn Abd Allah (died 633), companion of Muhammad
- Abd Allah ibn Abi Bakr (608–633), son of caliph Abu Bakr
- Abd Allah ibn Saba, Jewish anti-Rashidun rebel
- Abd Allah ibn Salam (died 663), Jewish companion of the Islamic prophet Muhammad
- Abd Allah ibn Ubayy (died 631), leading inhabitant of Medina and contemporary of Muhammad
- Abd Allah ibn Umar (610–693), narrator of hadith
- Abd Allah ibn al-Zubayr, (624–692), ruler of the 8th-century Zubayrid Caliphate
- Abd Allah ibn Yazid, an Umayyad prince and Military leader
- Abu Abd Allah Muhammad al-Bukhari (810–870), Persian muhaddith

=== Abdalla ===
- Abdalla El-Masri (born 1962), Lebanese composer
- Abdalla Hamdok (born 1956), most recent Sudanese president, who was deposed in a coup
- Ovadia Yosef (1920–2013), Israeli rabbi, born Abdalla Youssef

=== Abdallah ===
- Abdallah Somekh (1813–1889), Iraqi Sephardic rabbi
- Abdallah Abdalsalam (born 1983), Egyptian volleyball player
- Abdallah al-Adil (1224–1227), Caliph of Morocco
- Abdallah Aich (born 1995), Lebanese footballer
- Abdallah ibn Amir (626–678), Rashidun politician and military officer
- Abdallah Bou Habib (1941–2025), Lebanese diplomat
- Abdallah Djaballah (born 1956), Algerian politician
- Abdallah Al-Fakhouri (born 2000), Jordanian footballer
- Abdallah Kamal (1965–2014), Egyptian journalist and politician
- Abdallah El Maaroufi (1944–2011), Moroccan diplomat
- Abdallah ibn al-Mu'tazz (861–908), Arab poet
- Abdallah Saaf (born 1949), Moroccan academic and politician
- Abdallah ibn Sa'd, Arab administrator and commander
- Abdallah Shihiri (1868–1931), politician of the Somali Dervish movement
- Abdallah El-Yafi (1901–1986), Lebanese politician
- Abdallah al-Fadil al-Mahdi (1890–1966), Sudanese politician

=== Abdelilah ===
- Abdelilah Saber (born 1974), Moroccan association football player

=== Abdellah ===
- Abdellah Béhar (born 1963), French runner
- Abdellah Blinda (1951–2010), Moroccan association football manager
- Abdellah Liegeon (1957–2025), Algerian association football player

=== Abdulai ===
- Abdulai Bell-Baggie (born 1992), English association football player
- Abdulai Conteh (1945–2024), Sierra Leonean politician

=== Abdulah ===
- Abdulah Gegić (1924–2008), Yugoslav football coach and doctor of sciences in the veterinary field
- Abdulah Ibraković (born 1970), Bosnian professional football manager
- Abdulah Muhasilović (1898-??), Bosnian army chaplain
- Abdulah Mutapčić (1932–2013), Bosnian politician
- Abdulah Nakaš (1944–2005), Bosnian surgeon
- Abdulah Oruč (born 1955), Bosnian professional football manager
- Abdulah Sidran (1944–2024), Bosnian poet
- Abdulah Skaka (born 1983), Bosnian politician

=== Abdullah ===
- Abdullah ibn Abd al-Muttalib (545–570), the father of Muhammad
- Abdullah (Chagatai Khanate) (died 1359), ruler of the Chagatai
- Abdullah (Ismaili Mustaali Missionary), first Ismaili, Fatimid, mustaali saint to reach India, c. 1067 AD
- Abdullah ibn Abbas (619–687), narrator of hadith
- Abdullah Abdullah (born 1960), the former foreign minister of Afghanistan
- Abdullah al-Amiri, judge in the trial of Iraqi dictator Saddam Hussein
- Abdulla Aripov (born 1962), Prime minister of Uzbekistan
- Abdullah Tahir, Ethiopian-Yemeni governor
- Abdullah Anderson (born 1996), American football player
- Abdullah Atalar (born 1954), Turkish academic
- Abdullah Avcı (born 1963), Turkish association football manager
- Abdullah Aydoğdu (born 1991), Turkish Paralympian goalball player
- Abdullah Yusuf Azzam (1941–1989), Islamist leader, assassinated in 1989
- Abdullah Ahmad Badawi (1939–2025), Prime Minister of Malaysia (2003–2009)
- Abdullah el Baqui (1886–1952), Bengali Islamic scholar, writer and politician
- Abdullah Baybaşin (born 1960), Turkish mob boss
- Abdullah Bishara (born 1936), Kuwaiti diplomat
- Abdullah Bughra (died 1934), Emir of the First East Turkestan Republic
- Abdullah Cevdet (1869–1932), Turkish physician
- Abdullah Çatlı (1956–1996), Turkish secret government agent
- Abdullah Al Damluji (1890–1970), Iraqi physician and politician
- Abdullah Demirbaş (born 1966), Turkish politician
- Abdullah D. Dimaporo, Filipino politician
- Abdullah Durak (born 1987), Turkish association football player
- Abdullah Ercan (born 1971), Turkish association football player
- Abdullah Franji (born 1943), Palestinian politician and Fatah member
- Abdullah Gül (born 1950), Turkish politician and 11th President of Turkey
- Abdullah Halman (born 1987), Turkish association football player
- Abdullah bin Suleiman Al Hamdan (1887–1965), Saudi Arabian politician and businessman
- Abdullah Hanafi, Bruneian administrator
- Abdullah al-Harari (1906–2008), Islamic scholar
- Abdullah Ilgaz (born 1998), Turkish para-athlete
- Abdullah I of Jordan (1882–1951), Emir of Transjordan (1921–1946) and King of Jordan (1946–1951)
- Abdullah II of Jordan (born 1962), King of Jordan since 1999
- Abdullah İçel (born 1982), Turkish-Belgian futsal player
- Abdullah Abdul Kadir (1796–1854), early 19th century Malay writer
- Abdullah Kayapınar (born 1992), Turkish Paralympian para powerlifter
- Abdullah bin Ahmad Al Khalifa (1769–1849), ruler of Bahrain between 1821 and 1843
- Abdullah Khan (born 1971), an Indian author and scriptwriter
- Abdullah Kobayashi (born 1976), born Yosuke Kobayashi, Japanese wrestler
- Abdullah al Mahmood (1900–1975), Bengali politician and former minister in Pakistan
- Abdullah Malallah (born 1983), Emirati association football player
- Abdullah al Mamun (1942–2008), Bangladeshi playwright, actor, and filmmaker
- Abdullah Mando (born 1971), Syrian footballer
- Abdullah ibn Masud (594–652), a companion of Muhammad
- Abdullah Mirza (1410–1451), ruler of the Timurid Empire
- Abdullah Morsi (1994–2019), son of former Egyptian President Mohamed Morsi
- Abdullah Muhammad Shah II of Perak (1842–1922), one of the parties to the Pangkor Treaty of 1874
- Abdullah Abbas Nadwi (1925–2006), Indian Islamic scholar
- Abdullah bin Zayed Al Nahyan (born 1972), United Arab Emirati politician
- Abdullah Sani (born 1956), Indonesian politician who was elected to serve as Vice Governor of Jambi
- Abdullah Nangyal (born 1986), Pashtun human rights activist and one of the leaders of the Pashtun Tahafuz Movement
- Abdullah Al Noman (1942–2025), Bangladeshi politician
- Abdullah Al Nuaimi, Emirati engineer and politician
- Abdullah Oğuz (born 1958), Turkish film director
- Abdullah Öcalan (born 1948), Kurdish opposition leader and founder of the Kurdistan Workers Party
- Abdullah Omar Nasseef (1939–2025), Saudi chemist and geologist
- Abdullah Öztürk (born 1989), Turkish para table tennis player
- Abdullah of Pahang (born 1959), King of Malaysia and Sultan of Pahang
- Abdullah bin Ali Al Rashid (1788–1848), founder of the Emirate of Jabal Shammar
- Abdullah bin Ghazi (1935–1998), Pakistani religious scholar and founder of Faridia University, Islamabad
- Abdullah Al Rasi (1929–1994), Lebanese physician and politician
- Abdullah ibn Rawaha (590–629), general in the Battle of Mut'ah
- Abdullah bin Saud Al Saud (died 1819), Ruler of the First Saudi State
- Abdullah bin Faisal Al Saud (1831–1889) (1831–1889), Ruler of the Emirate of Diriyah
- Abdullah bin Faisal Al Saud (1923–2007) (1923–2007), Saudi royal and businessman
- Abdullah bin Thunayan Al Saud (died 1843), Emir of Nejd
- Abdullah bin Abdullah Al Saud (1843-??), Saudi royal
- Abdullah of Saudi Arabia (1924–2015), Former ruler of Saudi Arabia
- Abdullah bin Muhammad Al Sheikh (1751–1829), Wahhabi scholar
- Abdullah Elyasa Süme (born 1983), Turkish association football player
- Abdullah Tal (1918–1973), Jordanian soldier
- Abdullah al-Theni (born 1988), Deputy Emir of Qatar and unofficial heir presumptive to the Emir of Qatar
- Abdullah bin Muhammad Al Sheikh (1751–1829), Head of Saudi religious establishment after Ibn Abd al-Wahhab died
- Abdullah Bukhari (1922–2009), 12th Shahi Imam of the Jama Masjid, Delhi
- Abdullah Tuğluk (born 1999), Turkish long-distance runner
- Abdullah Yılmaz, name list
- Abdullah Yılmaz (football referee) (,born 1978), Turkish football referee
- Abdullah Yılmaz (skier, born 1961) (born 1961), Turkish skier
- Abdullah Yılmaz (skier, born 2004), Turkish skier
- Abdullah Yorulmaz (born 1983), Turkish para archer

== Surname ==
=== Abdalla ===
- Ahmad Abdalla (born 1979), Egyptian film director
- Ali Abdalla (born 1982), Eritrean long-distance runner
- Asha Ahmed Abdalla (born 1958), Somali politician
- Khalid Abdalla (born 1980), British actor

=== Abdallah ===
- Abu Makhlad Abdallah, Iranian statesman from Tabaristan
- Alexander Abdallah (born 1993), Swedish actor and filmmaker of Lebanese descent
- Ali al-Abdallah, Syrian writer and human rights activist
- Gene G. Abdallah (1934–2019), American politician
- Hamza Abdallah (born 2003), Comorian footballer
- Georges Ibrahim Abdallah (born 1951), Lebanese communist militant serving a life sentence for complicity in murder
- Marajil also known as Umm Abdallah (died 786), mother of Abbasid caliph Al-Ma'mun.
- Mohammed ben Abdallah (playwright), (1944–2025), Ghanaian playwright
- Mohamed Abdallah (born 1975), British citizen with African origin, A Chartered Accountant with ACCA and CPA(T)
- Sallamah Umm Abdallah, was the spouse of Muhammad ibn Ali and mother of Al-Mansur.

=== Abdellah ===
- Faye Glenn Abdellah (1919–2017), American nurse
- Nacer Abdellah (born 1966), Moroccan footballer

=== Abdulah ===
- Clive Abdulah (born 1927), former Bishop of Trinidad
- David Abdulah, Trinidad and Tobago trade unionist, economist and politician
- Masood Abdulah (born 1993), English professional boxer

=== Abdullah ===
- Abdul Abdullah (born 1986), Australian artist, brother of artist Abdul-Rahman Abdullah
- Abdul Rahman Abdullah, Muslim name of Donny Meluda, armed robber
- Abdul-Rahman Abdullah (born 1977), Australian artist, brother of artist Abdul Abdullah
- Abdullah Abdullah (born 1960), former foreign minister of Afghanistan
- Adel Abdullah (born 1984), Syrian association football player
- Ameer Abdullah (born 1993), American football running back
- Chelsea Abdullah, Kuwaiti American novelist
- Farah Zeynep Abdullah (born 1989), Turkish actress
- Husain Abdullah (born 1985), American football player
- Ismail Sabri Abdullah (1924–2006), Egyptian economist and politician
- Khalid Abdullah (born 1995), American former professional football running back
- Majed Abdullah (born 1959), Saudi Arabian football player
- Melina Abdullah (born 1972), American academic and civic leader
- Muhammad Kho Abdullah (1984–2016), Muslim name of Kho Jabing, convicted Malaysian killer
- Omar Abdullah (born 1970), last Chief Minister of Jammu and Kashmir
- Rafidine Abdullah (born 1994), French-Comorian football player
- Rahim Abdullah (born 1976), American football player
- Roshdi bin Abdullah Altway (1959–2025), a Singaporean convicted killer and drug trafficker
- Salwa Abdullah (born 1953), Syrian politician
- Sheikh Abdullah (1905–1982), known as Sher-e-Kashmir, first Prime Minister of Jammu and Kashmir
- Tewfik Abdullah (1896–1963), Egyptian footballer
- Thandiwe Abdullah, American civic activist
- Yasir Abdullah (born 2000), American football player

== Fictional characters ==
- Abdul Alhazred, sometimes referred to as Abdullah Alhazred
- Abdullah (comics), from The Adventures of Tintin by Hergé
- Abdullah the Butcher, born Lawrence Shreve, Canadian wrestler
- Abdullah ibn al-Wahhab from the Amelia Peabody series, foreman for the Emerson family's archeological excavation sites
- Abdullah, main protagonist of Castle in the Air, the sequel to Howl's Moving Castle

== See also ==
=== Related names ===
- Abdollah (disambiguation)
- Abdullah (disambiguation)
- Abdullah I (disambiguation)
- Abdullah II (disambiguation)
- Abdullah Al Mamun (disambiguation)
- Abdullah Khan (disambiguation)
- Abdullah Al Thani (disambiguation)
- Khalid Abdullah (disambiguation)
- King Abdullah (disambiguation)
- Mohamed Abdullah (disambiguation)
- Mohammed Abdullah (disambiguation)
- Raja Abdullah (disambiguation)
- Salem Abdullah (disambiguation)
- Given names: Abdullah/Abdallah/Abdulah/etc., Abdollah, Abdala, Abdullahi, Abdulahi, Abdollahi, Abdullai, Abu Abdullah
- Surnames: Abdullaev, Abdulayev, Abdullayev, Abdulloev, Abdulov, Abdulin, Abdullin

=== Other ===
- Arabic name
- Turkish name
- List of Arabic theophoric names
