= Raja Abdullah =

Raja Abdullah may refer to:

- Raja Abdullah bin Raja Jaafar, a Malay from Riau; participant in the Klang War
- Sultan Abdullah Muhammad Shah II Ibni Almarhum Sultan Jaafar Safiuddin Muazzam Shah, Malaysian sultan, one of the parties to the Pangkor Treaty of 1874, later exiled to Seychelles

== See also ==
- Abdullah (name)
- Abdullah (disambiguation)
- Abdullah I (disambiguation)
- Abdullah II (disambiguation)
- King Abdullah (disambiguation)
- Abdullah Khan (disambiguation)
