= Obediah (disambiguation) =

Obediah is a name and may refer to:

== Buildings ==
- Obediah Barber Homestead in Ware County, Georgia, U.S.
- Obediah Farrar House near Haywood, Lee County, North Carolina, U.S.
- Obediah Shirley House near Honea Path, South Carolina, U.S.
- Obediah Winston Farm near Creedmoor, North Carolina, U.S.

== People ==
=== People with the given name Obediah ===
- Abner Cole (1783–1835, pen name Obediah Dogberry, Esq.), American 19th-century newspaper editor
- O. C. French (born as Obediah Crew French), American 19th-century state legislator in Mississippi
- Obediah Parker Goucher (1865–1947), Canadian educator, insurance agent, political figure
- Obediah Summers (1844–1896), American AME minister, an American Civil War veteran, and chaplain
- Obediah Timbaci (born 2003), Vanuatuan sprinter

=== People with the middle name Obediah ===
- William Obediah Robey (c. 1820 – 1888), American Presbyterian minister, teacher

== See also ==
- *
- Ovadia (name)
- Obadiah (disambiguation)
