= Obadiah (disambiguation) =

Obadiah is a Biblical prophet whose name means "servant of Yahweh" or "worshipper of Yahweh".

Obadiah may also refer to:

- Obadiah (given name), including a list of biblical figures, people and fictional characters
- Obadiah Parker, stage name of American singer-songwriter Mat Weddle (born 1983)
- Book of Obadiah, a book of the Hebrew Bible
- Obadiah (Abarat), a fictional place in Abarat by Clive Barker
- Obadiah (album), 2010 debut album of Frazey Ford
- Obadiah School of the Bible, a school in Bethel, Pennsylvania, maintained by the Assemblies of Yahweh

== See also ==
- Ovadia, a given name and surname
- Abdias (disambiguation)
- Abdiel (disambiguation)
- Abdullah (disambiguation)
- Ubeidiya (disambiguation)
