= Mamoun =

Mamoun or Mamun may refer to

- Mamoun (name)
- Mamoun University for Science and Technology in Syria
- Pol Mamun, a village in Iran

== See also ==
- Al-Ma'mun (disambiguation)
