= Muhammad Abdul =

Muhammad Abdul may refer to:

== People ==
=== Muhammad Abdul ===
- Muhammad Abdul Aleem Siddiqi (1892–1954), Pakistani Islamic scholar, spiritual master, author, and preacher
- Muhammad Abdul Bari (born 1953), Bangladeshi-born British physicist, writer, teacher, and community leader
- Muhammad Abdul Bari (academic) (1930–2003), Bangladeshi academic, linguist and Islamic scholar
- Muhammad Abdul Hafiz (born 1967), Bangladeshi judge
- Muhammad Abdul Hamid, Bangladeshi economist, researcher, writer and academician
- Muhammad Abdul Hye (1919–1969), Bengali educationist, litterateur, researcher, and linguist
- Muhammad Abdul Mannan (born 1946), Bangladeshi politician
- Muhammad Abdul Qayyum Khan (1924–2015), Kashmiri politician
- Muhammad Rashid (field hockey, born 1941) (1941–2009), Pakistani field hockey player, incorrectly referred to in some sources as "Muhammad Abdul Rashid"

=== Muhammed Abdul ===
- Muhammed Abdul Ali (born 1951), Nawab of Indian
- Muhammed Abdul Hakkim Azhari, Indian scholar, educationalist, and businessman
- Muhammed Abdullahi Hassan, Somali al-Shabaab member
- Muhammed Abul Manzur (1940–1981), Bangladesh Army general
- Muhammed Abdul Muid Khan (born 1977), Bangladeshi-born British barrister and human rights activist

=== Mohammad Abdul ===
- Mohammad Abdul Ahed (1919–2001), Pakistani architect and painter
- Mohammad Abdul Ghafoor Hazarvi (1909–1970), Paskistani Islamic theologian, jurist, and scholar
- Mohammad Abdul Halim, Bangladeshi footballer
- Mohammad Isa bin Abdul Halim, also known as Isa Halim (born 1986), Singaporean footballer
- Mohammad Abdul Hamid (born 1944), Bangladeshi politician
- Mohammad Abdul Jalil (1942–1989), Bangladeshi military officer
- Mohammad Abdullahi Omar, Somalilander politician
- Mohammad Abdul Latif (died 2013), Bangladesh Army general
- Mohammad Abdul Munim, Bangladeshi politician
- Mohammad Abdur Rab (Bir Uttam) (1919–1975), Bangladesh Army general
- Mohammad Abdur Razzaque (born 1950), Bangladeshi politician
- Mohammad Abdus Sattar (1925–2011), Indian footballer
- Mohammad Abdul-Wali (1939–1973), Yemeni diplomat and writer

=== Mohammed Abdul ===
- Mohammed Abdulbasit (born 1995), Emirati footballer
- Mohammed Abdul-Hayy (1944–1989), Sudanese poet
- Mohamed Abdul Khalek Hassouna (1898–1992), Egyptian-Palestinian diplomat
- Mohammed Abdullahi Abubakar (born 1956), Nigerian politician
- Mohamed Abdullahi Hassan Noah, Somali politician
- Mohamed Abdullahi Mohamed (born 1962), Somali politician
- Mohamed Abdullahi Omaar (born 1952), Somali politician and diplomat
- Mohammed Abdul Matin (1932–2012), Bangladeshi politician
- Mohammed Abdur Rahiman (1898–1945), Indian independence activist, Islamic leader, scholar, and politician
- Mohammed Abdul-Saaka (born 1935), Ghanaian politician
- Mohammed Abdul Sattar (born 1958), Syrian politician
- Mohamed Abdul Hadj (born 1966), Malaysian field hockey player
- Valerio Storch, also known as Mohammed Abdul (born 1986), member of the Italian comedy rock band Nanowar of Steel

=== Mahammad Abdul ===
- Mahammad Abdullayev (born 1999), Azerbaijani boxer

=== Muhammad Abdal ===
- Muhammad Abd al-Halim Abd Allah (1913–1970), Egyptian novelist
- Muhammad abd-al-Salam Faraj (1952–1982), Egyptian Islamist

=== Muhammad Abdel ===
- Muhammad Abdel Moneim (1899–1979), Egyptian prince

=== Mohammad Abdel ===
- Mohammad Abdel-Haleem (born 1982), Jordanian footballer

=== Mohammed Abdal ===
- Mohamed Abd Al-Jawad (born 1962), Saudi Arabian footballer

=== Mohammed Abdel ===
- Mohamed Abdel Fatah (footballer) (born 1949), Sudanese footballer
- Mohamed Abdelfatah (wrestler) (born 1978), Egyptian Greco-Roman wrestler
- Mohammed Abdelhak Zakaria (born 1974), Moroccan-Bahraini long-distance runner
- Mohammed Abdel-Jawad (born 1979), Palestinian footballer
- Mohamed Abdel-Kader Coubadja-Touré (born 1979), Togolese footballer
- Mohammed Abdel Karim Al Ghezali, Yemeni al-Qaeda propagandist
- Mohammed Abdellaoue (born 1985), Norwegian footballer
- Mohamed Abdelmonem (born 1999), Egyptian footballer
- Mohammed Abdel Nabi (born 1977), Egyptian writer

== Characters ==
- Muhammad Avdol, a fictional character in the manga series JoJo's Bizarre Adventure

== See also ==
- Abdul (name)
- Mohamed Abdelaziz (disambiguation)
- Mohamed Abdel Rahman (disambiguation)
- Mohammed Abdullah (disambiguation)
- Muhammad (name)
- Muhammad 'Abd al-Wahhab (disambiguation)
