= Abdollah (disambiguation) =

Abdollah is a given name.

Abdollah may also refer to:

- Abdollah, Kurdistan
- Abdollah, Sistan and Baluchestan
- Abdollah, Darmian, South Khorasan Province
- Abdollah, Yazd

== See also ==
- Abdullah (disambiguation)
