= Abdias =

Abdias may refer to:

- Obadiah or Abdias, a Biblical theophorical name
  - Book of Abdias, the shortest book in the Hebrew Bible
- Abdias of Babylon, said to have been one of the Seventy Apostles mentioned in the Gospel of Luke
- Abdas of Susa or Abdias, a bishop of Susa in Iran
- Abdias, a deacon and companion in martyrdom of Abda and Abdjesus
- Abdias do Nascimento (1914–2011), Afro-Brazilian scholar, artist, and politician
- Abdias Maurel (died 1705), Camisard leader

== See also ==
- Abdia, a village in Howmeh Rural District, Central District. Damghan County, Semnan Province, Iran
- Obadiah (disambiguation)
