= 2026 Sri Lanka Super League =

Sri Lanka Super League
- Season: 2026
- Dates: 11 July–TBC
- Matches: 57
- Goals: 202 (3.54 per match)
- Top goalscorer: Benjamin York (12 goal)
- All statistics correct as of 3 November 2026.

The 2026 Sri Lanka Super League was the 2nd season of Sri Lanka Super League,after a 5-year delay. It is the top division of Sri Lankan football. Previously, Sri Lanka Champions League is the top division of Sri Lankan, but succeeded by the professional Sri Lanka Super League which serves as the first division.

== Summary ==
The 2026 Sri Lanka Super League is the current edition of the top-tier professional football league in Sri Lanka. The tournament commenced on 11 July 2026 and is scheduled to conclude on 15 September 2026. The league is being contested in a round-robin format, where each team faces one another once. All matches of the tournament are held at the Sugathadasa Stadium.

== Teams ==
Following Ten teams are participating in this tournament.

=== Teams and their divisions ===
Note: Table lists clubs in alphabetical order.

Team	Division
Blue Eagles	Kelaniya
Blue Star	Kalutara
Colombo	Colombo
Defenders	Homagama
Navy Sea Hawks	Welisara
New Young's	Wennappuwa
Ratnam	Kotahena
Red Stars	Aluthgama
Renown	Kotahena
Up Country Lions	Nawalapitiya

== Standings ==
Pos	Team	Pld	W	D	L	GF	GA	GD	Pts
1	Up Country Lions	11	11	0	0	43	6	+37	33
2	Colombo	11	7	3	1	22	8	+14	24
3	Navy Sea Hawks	11	6	2	3	21	8	+13	20
4	Blue Eagles	12	6	1	5	16	15	+1	19
5	Red Stars	11	5	3	3	20	17	+3	18
6	Renown	11	4	3	4	21	13	+8	15
7	Defenders	12	3	1	8	17	21	−4	10
8	Blue Star	11	4	1	6	20	27	−7	13
9	New Young's	12	1	2	9	9	46	−37	5
10	Ratnam	12	2	0	10	10	38	−28	6

Updated to match(es) played on 3 November 2026. Source: FFSL

== Match officials ==
Referee

- (Sri Lanka) Fazmi Soodin (†)
- (Sri Lanka) Indunil Sandakelum (†)
- (Sri Lanka) Sashanka Madushanka (†)
- (Sri Lanka) A. M. Jaffran (†)
- (Sri Lanka) Chathura Maduranga (†)
- (Sri Lanka) Kasun Lakmal Weerakkody (†)
- (Sri Lanka) G.N.Rabish (†)
- (Sri Lanka) Mohammad Roomy (†)

Assistant Referees

- (Sri Lanka) L.K.I. Udayakantha (†)
- (Sri Lanka) Hirantha Piumal (†)
- (Sri Lanka) Sadeepa Samaranayaka (†)
- (Sri Lanka) Kushan Indika (†)
- (Sri Lanka) Nimasha Thennakoon (†)
- (Sri Lanka) Sampath Liyanagunawardana (†)
- (Sri Lanka) Asela Siriwardana (†)
- (Sri Lanka) Buddika Dias (†)
- (Sri Lanka) Ishara Rathnayaka (†)
- (Sri Lanka) Palitha Hemathunga (†)
- (Sri Lanka) Chamath (†)
- (Sri Lanka) Vihanga Maduwantha (†)
- (Sri Lanka) Chamalka Ridmal (†)

Fourth Official

- (Sri Lanka) Lakshan Williams (†)
- (Sri Lanka) Asif Asker (†)
- (Sri Lanka) Tharanga Pushpakumara (†)
- (Sri Lanka) Sabirul Hasan (†)
- (Sri Lanka) Heshan De Silva (†)
- (Sri Lanka) Mohammad Salman (†)

(†): Also performed as Referee, Assistant Referee and Fourth Official in some matches.

== Results ==
Teams	BEG	BST	CFC	DFC	SHW	NYS	RAT	RST	REN	UCL
Blue Eagles			0–1	2–1	0–2				2–0	
Blue Star	3–1		0–2		1–3				2–3	3–5
Colombo				0–0		3–0	5–0		0–0	0–2
Defenders		1–2				5–1	4–1			
Navy Sea Hawks			1–2	2–0			7–0	1–0	2–2	0–1
New Young's	1–2	0–5			0–2		0–3			
Ratnam	1–4	1–3		1–0				0–3		1–5
Red Stars	1–0	2–0	2–6	5–1		3–3				
Renown				3–0		10–0	3–0	0–2		0–3
Up Country Lions	4–0			2–1		6–0		4–0		

Updated to match(es) played on 3 November 2026. Source: FFSL
Legend: Blue = left column team win; Yellow = draw; Red = top row team win.

== Fixtures ==
=== Week 1 ===
11 July 2026 Match 1	New Young's	1–1	Blue Eagles	Sugathadasa Stadium
15:30 UTC+5:30	Rumesh 49'	Report	Deshan 73'	Referee: (Sri Lanka) Kasun Lakmal Weerakkody

12 July 2026 Match 2	Colombo	0–0	Defenders	Sugathadasa Stadium
15:30 UTC+5:30		Report		Referee: (Sri Lanka) A. M. Jaffran

17 July 2026 Match 3	Blue Star	1–9	Up Country Lions	Sugathadasa Stadium
15:30 UTC+5:30	Shifan 41'	Report	Ombebe 12'; Ishan 34', 37'; M Aakib 39', 50'; Benjamin 45', 45', 90'; Ankrah 80'	Referee: (Sri Lanka) Chathura Maduranga

18 July 2026 Match 4	Renown	3–0	Ratnam	Sugathadasa Stadium
15:30 UTC+5:30	Aman 53'; Fazlur 56'; F Shahil 90+3'	Report		Referee: (Sri Lanka) Sashanka Madushanka

20 July 2026 Match 5	Sea Hawks	1–0	Red Stars	Sugathadasa Stadium
15:30 UTC+5:30	Hasmeer 50'	Report		Referee: (Sri Lanka) Indunil Sandakelum

=== Week 2 ===
25 July 2026 Match 6	Blue Star	3–1	Blue Eagles	Sugathadasa Stadium
15:30 UTC+5:30	Shesternin 44'; Franky 61'; Shuhaib 83'	Report	Zaheer 89'

26 July 2026 Match 7	Colombo	3–0	New Young's	Sugathadasa Stadium
15:30 UTC+5:30	Pramantha 50'; Manesh 66'; Sathar 87'	Report		Referee: (Sri Lanka) Kasun Lakmal Weerakkody

27 July 2026 Match 8	Sea Hawks	7–0	Ratnam	Sugathadasa Stadium
15:30 UTC+5:30	Yugesh 30', 45', 60'; Perera 40'; Meera 45+2'; David 48'; Kurshith 90'	Report		Referee: (Sri Lanka) G.N.Rabish

28 July 2026 Match 9	Renown	3–0	Defenders	Sugathadasa Stadium
15:30 UTC+5:30	Ahmed 8'; Ashath 70'; Anjey 90+7'	Report		Referee: (Sri Lanka) Chathura Maduranga

29 July 2026 Match 10	Up Country Lions	4–0	Red Stars	Sugathadasa Stadium
15:30 UTC+5:30	Yahya 16'; Aakib 21'; Ishan 45+2'; Nichalas 54'	Report		Referee: (Sri Lanka) A. M. Jaffran

=== Week 3 ===
1 August 2026 Match 11	Renown	10–0	New Young's	Sugathadasa Stadium
15:30 UTC+5:30	Ashath 3' (pen.), 50'; Fareeq 6'; Abdelfattah 12'; Mujeeb 19'; Kameel 33'; Aman 65'; Ameen 71'; Shameel 86', 88'	Report		Referee: (Sri Lanka) Mohammad Roomy

2 August 2026 Match 12	Red Stars	2–0	Blue Star	Sugathadasa Stadium
15:30 UTC+5:30	Supun 42'; Jerome 65'	Report		Referee: (Sri Lanka) Chathura Maduranga

3 August 2026 Match 13	Colombo	5–0	Ratnam	Sugathadasa Stadium
15:30 UTC+5:30	Chalana Chameera 26'; Ahmed Shazny 45+3', 56'; Mohamed Aly Elshasly 50'; Ourosh Manesh 62'	Report		Referee: (Sri Lanka) Sampath Liyanagunawardana

4 August 2026 Match 14	Sea Hawks	0–1	Up Country Lions	Sugathadasa Stadium
15:30 UTC+5:30		Report	Naveen 17'

5 August 2026 Match 15	Blue Eagles	2–0	Defenders	Sugathadasa Stadium
15:30 UTC+5:30	Stephan Fernando 20'; Doku Felix 84'

=== Week 4 ===
7 August 2026 Match 16	Colombo	0–0	Renown	Sugathadasa Stadium
15:30 UTC+5:30		Report

8 August 2026 Match 17	Red Stars	3–3	New Young's	Sugathadasa Stadium
15:30 UTC+5:30	Assande Jerome 34'; Chamod Dilshan 56'; Mohamed Farhath 67'	Report	Samuel Nimo 20', 41', 75'

9 August 2026 Match 18	Ratnam	0–2	Blue Eagles	Sugathadasa Stadium
15:30 UTC+5:30		Report	Doku Felix 31', 57'

10 August 2026 Match 19	Blue Star	0–0	Sea Hawks	Sugathadasa Stadium
15:30 UTC+5:30		Report

11 August 2026 Match 20	Up Country Lions	2–1	Defenders	Sugathadasa Stadium
15:30 UTC+5:30	Naveen Jude 22'; Benjamin York 77'	Report	Mohamed Aadhif 90+2'

=== Week 5 ===
14 August 2026 Match 21	Blue Eagles	0–1	Colombo	Sugathadasa Stadium
15:30 UTC+5:30		Report	Umar Mohamed Shakil 35'

15 August 2026 Match 22	Renown	0–0	Red Stars	Sugathadasa Stadium
15:30 UTC+5:30		Report

16 August 2026 Match 23	Ratnam	1–5	Up Country Lions	Sugathadasa Stadium
15:30 UTC+5:30	Mohamed Shareek 25'	Report	Benjamin York 4', 17'; Abdul Rahuman Yahya 19'; Mohamed Akib 23'; Naveen Jude 38'

17 August 2026 Match 24	Defenders	0–2	Sea Hawks	Sugathadasa Stadium
15:30 UTC+5:30		Report	Shehan Silva 9'; Nagoor Meera 76'

18 August 2026 Match 25	New Young's	0–5	Blue Star	Sugathadasa Stadium
15:30 UTC+5:30		Report	Abeysiri 21'; Franky 35', 76', 90+2'; Shifan 54'

=== Week 6 ===
21 August 2026 Match 26	Defenders	4–1	Ratnam	Sugathadasa Stadium
15:30 UTC+5:30	Abdeen Fayas 21'; Shifan Kaleel 56', 72'; Mohamed Aadhif 58'	Report	S Jesuyhashan 45+5'

22 August 2026 Match 27	Up Country Lions	6–0	New Young's	Sugathadasa Stadium
15:30 UTC+5:30	Benjamin York 1'; Mohamed Ishan 33'; Mohamed Akeel 36'; Mohamed Asath 43'; Mohamed Akib 45+3'; Naveen Jude 61'	Report

23 August 2026 Match 28	Blue Star	0–2	Colombo	Sugathadasa Stadium
15:30 UTC+5:30		Report	Ahmed 4'; Chalana 48'

24 August 2026 Match 29	Red Stars	1–0	Blue Eagles	Sugathadasa Stadium
15:30 UTC+5:30	Supun Dananjaya 31'	Report

25 August 2026 Match 30	Sea Hawks	2–2	Renown	Sugathadasa Stadium
15:30 UTC+5:30	Ezekiel 13', 16'	Report	Mujeeb 52'; Dilip 60'

=== Week 7 ===
28 August 2026 Match 31	Up Country Lions	4–0	Blue Eagles	Sugathadasa Stadium
15:30 UTC+5:30	Naveen Jude 60', 66'; Mohamed Akib 67', 90+1'	Report

29 August 2026 Match 32	Blue Star	2–3	Renown	Sugathadasa Stadium
15:30 UTC+5:30	Mohamed Fahir 21'; Mohamed Izaz 44'	Report	Muhammedh Shahil 13'; Mohamed Ashath 19'; Emmanuel Anaful 58'

30 August 2026 Match 33	Red Stars	5–1	Defenders	Sugathadasa Stadium
15:30 UTC+5:30	Dananjaya 23'; Jerome 45+4' 90+3'; Chathuranga 47' (o.g.); S. Kithusan 77'	Report	Pathirana 11'

31 August 2026 Match 34	Sea Hawks	1–1	Colombo	Sugathadasa Stadium
15:30 UTC+5:30	Navindu Shehan Silva 49'	Report	Ibrahim Lebbie 90+7'

1 September 2026 Match 35	New Young's	3–2	Ratnam	Sugathadasa Stadium
15:30 UTC+5:30	Asith 3', 34'; Fernando 75'	Report	Shareek 14'; Chikereuba 45+4'

=== Week 8 ===
4 September 2026 Match 36	Blue Eagles	2–0	Renown	Sugathadasa Stadium
15:30 UTC+5:30	Sathees 38'; Kavinidu 40'	Report

5 September 2026 Match 37	Defenders	1–2	Blue Star	Sugathadasa Stadium
15:30 UTC+5:30	Aravinraj 61'	Report	Izaz 30', 56'

6 September 2026 Match 38	Ratnam	0–3	Red Stars	Sugathadasa Stadium
15:30 UTC+5:30		Report	Supun Dananjaya 45'; Assande Jerome 69'; Mohamed Rifkan 90+2'

7 September 2026 Match 39	New Young's	0–2	Sea Hawks	Sugathadasa Stadium
15:30 UTC+5:30		Report	Kurshith 20'; Ezekiel 29'

8 September 2026 Match 40	Colombo	0–2	Up Country Lions	Sugathadasa Stadium
15:30 UTC+5:30		Report	Benjamin York 21'; Mohamed Akib 67'

=== Week 9 ===
11 September 2026 Match 41	Defenders	4–0	New Young's	Sugathadasa Stadium
15:30 UTC+5:30	Shifan Kaleel 66'; Sountharaj 69'; Fayas 79'; Chamod Kumara 83'	Report

12 September 2026 Match 42	Red Stars	2–2	Colombo	Sugathadasa Stadium
15:30 UTC+5:30	Peter Sylvanus 70'; Assande Jerome 75'	Report	Ibrahim Lebbie 16'; Mohamed Abdullah 33'

13 September 2026 Match 43	Renown	0–2	Up Country Lions	Sugathadasa Stadium
15:30 UTC+5:30		Report	Mohamed Ishan 39'; Mohamed Akib 76'

14 September 2026 Match 44	Ratnam	1–3	Blue Star	Sugathadasa Stadium
15:30 UTC+5:30	Mohamed Shareek 24'	Report	Mohamed Izaz 40'; Aoudou Franky 63', 90+4'

15 September 2026 Match 45	Blue Eagles	0–2	Sea Hawks	Sugathadasa Stadium
15:30 UTC+5:30		Report	David Candy 12'; Ezekiel Patrick 64'

=== Super Six Round ===
10 October 2026 Match 46	Renown SC	0–2	Red Star FC	Sugathadasa Stadium
3:30 PM UTC+5:30		Report	Assande Jerome 32'; Thuwan Syam 62'

11 October 2026 Match 47	Blue Star SC	3–5	Up Country Lions SC	Sugathadasa Stadium
3:30 PM UTC+5:30	Mohammed Shuhaib 26'; Mohamed Sahran 79'; Jerry Ombebe 90+2'	Report	Naveen Jude 7'; Benjamin York 41', 67', 77'; Abdul Rahman Yahya 69'

12 October 2026 Match 48	Sea Hawks FC	1–2	Colombo FC	Sugathadasa Stadium
3:30 PM UTC+5:30	Shehan Silva 6'	Report	Umar Mohamed Shakil 40'; Ibrahim Lebbie 85'

16 October 2026 Match 49	Blue Star SC	1–3	Sea Hawks FC	Sugathadasa Stadium
3:45 PM UTC+5:30	Jerry Ombebe 81'	Report	Ezekiel Patrick 33', 76'; Woranda Perera 49'

17 October 2026 Match 50	Red Star FC	2–6	Colombo FC	Sugathadasa Stadium
3:30 PM UTC+5:30	Mohamed Farhath 67'; Asande Jerome 80'	Report	Ibrahim Lebbie 11', 34', 43', 62', 69'; Mahmoud Aly 78'

18 October 2026 Match 51	Renown SC	0–3	Up Country Lions SC	Sugathadasa Stadium
3:30 PM UTC+5:30		Report	Kameel Hakeem 6' (o.g.); Naveen Jude 61'; Benjamin York 77'

23 October 2026 Match 52	Sea Hawks FC	v	Red Star FC	Sugathadasa Stadium
3:45 PM UTC+5:30

25 October 2026 Match 53	Renown SC	v	Blue Star SC	Sugathadasa Stadium
3:30 PM UTC+5:30

26 October 2026 Match 54	Colombo FC	v	Up Country Lions SC	Sugathadasa Stadium
3:30 PM UTC+5:30

30 October 2026 Match 55	Sea Hawks FC	v	Renown SC	Sugathadasa Stadium
3:45 PM UTC+5:30

31 October 2026 Match 56	Up Country Lions SC	v	Red Star FC	Sugathadasa Stadium
3:30 PM UTC+5:30

1 November 2026 Match 57	Colombo FC	v	Blue Star SC	Sugathadasa Stadium
3:30 PM UTC+5:30

21 November 2026 Match 58	Colombo FC	v	Renown SC	Sugathadasa Stadium
3:30 PM UTC+5:30

22 November 2026 Match 59	Red Star FC	v	Blue Star SC	Sugathadasa Stadium
3:30 PM UTC+5:30

23 November 2026 Match 60	Up Country Lions SC	v	Sea Hawks FC	Sugathadasa Stadium
3:30 PM UTC+5:30

=== Relegation Round ===
9 October 2026 Match 61	Defenders FC	5–1	New Youngs FC	Sugathadasa Stadium
3:45 PM UTC+5:30	Shifan Kaleel 25', 40', 60'; Mohamed Aadhif 47'; Sandun Sandaras 76'	Report	Samuel Nimo 34'

13 October 2026 Match 62	Blue Eagles SC	4–1	Ratnam SC	Sugathadasa Stadium
3:30 PM UTC+5:30	Doku Felix 40', 75', 79'; Ganeshan Sathees 82'	Report	Mohammed Afsal 90+3'

19 October 2026 Match 63	New Youngs FC	0–3	Ratnam SC	Sugathadasa Stadium
3:30 PM UTC+5:30		Report	Samuel Nimo 34'; Alpones Christhuraj 64'; Rauf Issahaku 90+1'

20 October 2026 Match 64	Blue Eagles SC	2–1	Defenders FC	Sugathadasa Stadium
3:30 PM UTC+5:30	Rasik Askar 21'; Doku Felix 38'	Report	Shifan Kaleel 82'

30 October 2026 Match 65	New Youngs FC	1–2	Blue Eagles SC	Sugathadasa Stadium
3:00 PM UTC+5:30	Rasanda Dilruksha 72'	Report	Doku Felix 14'; Krishan Danushka 43'

31 October 2026 Match 66	Ratnam SC	1–0	Defenders FC	Sugathadasa Stadium
3:00 PM UTC+5:30	Hakeem 63'	Report

== Goalscorers ==
There have been 202 goals scored in 57 matches, for an average of 3.54 goals per match (as of 3 November 2026).

12 goals

- Benjamin York (Up Country Lions)

9 goals

- Naveen Jude (Up Country Lions)

8 goals

- Doku Felix (Blue Eagles)
- Shifan Kaleel (Defenders)
- Ibrahim Lebbie (Colombo)
- Assande Jerome (Red Starts)
- M. Aakib (Up Country Lions)

6 goals

- Ezekiel Patrick (Navy Sea Hawks)
- Aoudou Franky (Blue Star)

5 goals

- Samuel Nimo (New Young's)
- Mohamed Ashath (Renown)

4 goals

- Abdul Rahman Yahya (Up Country Lions)
- Supun Dananjaya (Red Starts)
- Mohamed Ishan (Up Country Lions)
- Mohamed Izaz (Blue Star)

3 goals

- Shehan Silva (Navy Sea Hawks)
- Mohamed Aadhif (Defenders)
- Ahmed Shazny (Colombo)
- Wijesundram Yugesh (Navy Sea Hawks)
- Abdelfattah Ahmed (Renown)
- Mohamed Shareek (Ratnam)

2 goals

- Mohamed Aly Elshasly (Colombo)
- Mohamed Farhath (Red Starts)
- Woranda M. Perera (Navy Sea Hawks)
- Jerry Ombebe (Blue Star)
- Umar Mohamed Shakil (Colombo)
- Ganeshan Sathees (Blue Eagles)
- Mohammed Shuhaib (Blue Star)
- Muhammedh Shahil (Renown)
- Mohamed Mujeeb (Renown)
- Abdul Ishan (Up Country Lions)
- Fareeq Ahamed (Renown)
- Aman Faizer (Renown)
- Shameel Ahamed (Renown)
- Nagoor Meera (Navy Sea Hawks)
- Mohamed Shifan (Blue Star)
- Chalana Pramantha (Colombo)
- Asith Nirmal Kumara (New Young's)
- Kourosh Manesh (Colombo)
- Mohamed Kurshith (Navy Sea Hawks)
- Sountharaj Aravinraj (Defenders)
- Iqpabi David (Navy Sea Hawks)

1 goal

- Albear Shawqy Hakeem (Ratnam)
- Krishan Danushka (Blue Eagles)
- Rasanda Dilruksha (New Young's)
- Rasik Askar (Blue Star)
- Rauf Issahaku (New Young's)
- Alpones Christhuraj (New Young's)
- Mohammed Afsal (Ratnam)
- Arepade Ombebe (Up Country Lions)
- Mohamed Sahran (Blue Star)
- Thuwan Syam (Red Starts)
- Sandun Sandaras (Defenders)
- Peter Sylvanus (Red Starts)
- Chamod Kumara (Defenders)
- Abdeen Fayas (Defenders)
- Mohamed Rifkan (Red Starts)
- S. Kithusan (Red Starts)
- Niroshan Pathirana (Defenders)
- Mohamed Fahir (Blue Star)
- Rumesh Mendis (New Young's)
- Udara Deshan (Blue Eagles)
- Shesternin Aleksei (Blue Star)
- Firas Zaheer (Blue Eagles)
- Stephan Fernando (Blue Eagles)
- Abdul Ankrah (Up Country Lions)
- Fazlur Ahmed (Renown)
- Christian Anjey (Renown)
- Dilip Peiris (Renown)
- Kameel Hakeem (Renown)
- Mohamed Ameen Ali (Renown)
- Emmanuel Anaful (Renown)
- Mohamed Hasmeer (Navy Sea Hawks)
- Mohamed Sathar (Colombo)
- Chamod Dilshan (Red Starts)
- Chalana Chameera (Colombo)
- Navod Vihanga Abeysiri (Blue Star)
- S. Jesuyhashan (Ratnam)
- Mohamed Akeel (Up Country Lions)
- Francisco Dilshan Fernando (New Young's)
- Francis Chikereuba (Ratnam)
- Kavinidu Nethsara (Blue Eagles)
- Mohamed Abdullah (Colombo)

1 own goal

- Chathuranga Madushan Against (Red Starts)
- Kameel Hakeem Against (Up Country Lions SC)

== Champions ==
2026 Sri Lanka Super League

To be determined

== Broadcasting & ticketing ==
Territory	Broadcaster / Partner
Sri Lanka & Worldwide	Football Sri Lanka (Facebook & YouTube)
Ticketing Partner	My Tickets
