= Abdiel (disambiguation) =

Abdiel is a Hebrew name.

Abdiel may also refer to:

- HMS Abdiel, several destroyers and minelayers of Royal Navy
- Abdiel-class minelayer, a class of six fast minelayers commissioned into the Royal Navy

== See also ==
- Abdullah (disambiguation)
- Obadiah (disambiguation)
