= Harry Jacobs =

Harry Jacobs may refer to:

- Harry Jacobs (American football) (born 1937), American football player
- Harry Jacobs (tug of war), American tug of war athlete
- Harry Jacobs (Australian footballer) (1913–2000), Australian rules footballer
- Harry Allan Jacobs (1872–1932), American architect
- Harry Jacobs (conductor) (1888–1988), English accompanist, arranger and conductor in Australia

== See also ==
- Harry D. Jacobs High School, a public high school in Algonquin, Illinois
- Henry Jacobs (disambiguation)
