= Mamoon =

Mamoon is a given name and a surname. Notable people with the name include:

- Al-Mamoon (786–833), seventh Abbasid caliph
- Mamoon Abdul Gayoom (born 1937), President of Maldives 1978–2008
- Mamoon al-Farkh (1958–2020), Syrian television, theatre and voice actor
- Mamoon Hamid (born 1978), Pakistani-American venture capitalist
- Mamoon Jaffar Tarar, Pakistani politician
- Mamoon Kazi (1938–2014), Pakistani judge
- Mamoon Rashid Sheikh (born 1958), Pakistani jurist
- Mamoon Sadiq (born 1965), Pakistani sailor
- Khaleel Mamoon (born 1948), Urdu poet
- Margarita Mamoon (born 1995), Russian individual rhythmic gymnast
- Muntassir Mamoon (born 1951), Bangladeshi writer, historian, professor at University of Dhaka
- Razaq Mamoon (born 1964), author, political analyst and journalist from Afghanistan

== See also ==
- Mamoon Tower aka Baghdad Tower, a 205 m (673 ft) TV tower in Baghdad, Iraq
- Mamoun (name)
