= Theodulus =

Greek given name meaning "servant of God"

Theodoulos (Greek: Θεόδουλος) or Theodulus (amongst other variations) is a Greek masculine given name. The name is a theophoric name, meaning 'servant of God' (in a similar construction to Christodoulos).

== People with the given name ==
=== Bishops, saints and martyrs ===
- Theodulus of Grammont (d. c. 400), bishop of Sion
- Leontius, Hypatius and Theodulus, Christian martyrs
- A saint and son of Nilus of Sinai
- A saint martyred at Synnada
- A saint and martyr with Anesius in Africa
- A saint martyred with Pope Alexander I
- One of the martyred sons of martyrs Exuperius and Zoe

=== Others ===
- supposed author of the Eclogue of Theodulus, a Latin verse dialogue
- Theodoulos Parsakoutenos (fl. 960s), Byzantine general

== People with the surname ==
- Michael Theodoulou

== See also ==
- Abdullah, an Arabic name with the same meaning
- Obadiah, a Hebrew name with the same meaning
- Theodul Pass
- Theodul Glacier
- Theodula of Anazarbus
- Théodule
