= To Reign in Hell =

1984 fantasy novel by Steven Brust

- First edition
- Author: Steven Brust
- Cover artist: Kathy Marschall
- Language: English
- Genre: Fantasy novel
- Publisher: Steeldragon Press
- Publication date: May 1984
- Publication place: United States
- Media type: Print (Hardcover, Paperback)
- Pages: 257 pp (first edition, hardback)
- ISBN: 0-916595-00-5 (first edition, hardback)
- OCLC: 10809544
- Dewey Decimal: 813/.54 19
- LC Class: PS3552.R84 T6 1984

To Reign in Hell is a 1984 fantasy novel by American writer Steven Brust. It deals with the revolt of angels in Heaven from a point of view that casts Satan as a sympathetic protagonist. The novel appears to be heavily influenced by John Milton's Paradise Lost.

The novel has had three different publishers since its initial publication: SteelDragon Press (limited edition hardcover), Ace Books (mass market paperback), and Tor Books (Orb trade paperback). The editions by SteelDragon Press and Ace Books are out of print.

== Plot summary ==
The story begins by detailing the creation story of Heaven. There is a substance of raw chaos: cacoastrum; and stuff of order: illiaster. From the illiaster came consciousness that resulted in the firstborn angels: Yaweh, Satan, Michael, Lucifer, Raphael, Leviathan and Belial. The firstborn create Heaven in order to protect themselves from the cacoastrum, which threatens to destroy them. This event is later referred to as the 'First Wave.' The walls of heaven have collapsed two times since then, resulting in the Second and Third Waves, creating, respectively, the archangels and angels.

After the third wave Heaven has been divided into four regencies named for the cardinal points of the compass. Belial, half-mad and trapped in the form of a dragon, rules the Northern Regency. Leviathan, a kindly woman in the shape of a sea serpent, oversees the Western Regency. Satan rules the South with his loyal servant Beelzebub, trapped in the body of a Golden Retriever. Lucifer rules the East, with his consort Lilith, who had previously been briefly involved with Satan. Yaweh oversees all of Heaven from the center, aided by his healer Raphael and warrior Michael.

Other important angels include the blind musician Harut, the poetry-quoting Ariel, the craftsman Asmodai, the smirking Mephistopheles, the dour Uriel, the sneering Abdiel, the somewhat naive Gabriel and the coolly competent Zaphkiel. A mostly independent subplot involving two angels named Kyriel and Sith gives the viewpoints of two low-level angels who get swept up in the story's events.

Trouble arises when Yaweh, worried about the imminent Fourth Wave, devises The Plan: the blueprint for a new, larger Heaven (Earth), with walls that the cacoastrum cannot destroy. Unfortunately, at least a thousand angels will die during the construction of his new Paradise. Yaweh charges Satan with securing the cooperation of every angel in Heaven, and Satan finds himself wondering if they have the ethical right to coerce anyone into participating.

Exacerbating matters is Abdiel, who craves Satan's rank. Abdiel begins playing Satan against Yaweh, telling each of them that the other will no longer discuss matters. Step by step, the factions escalate. Abdiel attempts to wound Beelzebub and accidentally kills the innocent Ariel. When Satan and Beelzebub attempt to avenge this, Raphael and Michael misinterpret this as proof their opponents have abandoned all decency.

Yaweh, attempting to rally his side, convinces his supporters that he is not only the eldest of the Firstborn, he is God. This announcement stuns not only his opponents, but even Michael, his closest supporter. Using the energy of his newfound worshippers, he creates a new angel, Yeshuah, who he proclaims his son and heir.

As the war continues, Zaphkiel intercepts Satan and brings him directly to Yaweh, where the two discover that Abdiel has played them both for fools. However, Satan will not acknowledge Yaweh's dishonest claim to Godhood, and neither will Yaweh abandon it, so the conflict continues.

Abdiel, now on the run from both sides, begins digging a hole in the wall of Heaven, but Mephistopheles finds and strangles him before he can finish the work. Satan's hosts gain the ascendancy in the battle. Seeing that defeat is inevitable, Yaweh decides to destroy Heaven by expanding the hole that Abdiel had been deepening. Yet when the wall of Heaven is breached, flooding Heaven with cacoastrum, Yaweh finds that he cannot allow himself to be destroyed by the cacoastrum; it is not in his nature.

Yeshuah, seeing an opportunity to triumph over Satan's forces, sacrifices his life by leaping into the breach and directing the rupture towards the hosts of Satan, devastating them. Meanwhile, as the rebels fight for Heaven, Satan is captured but with the help of Beelzebub and Mephistopheles leaves Heaven; his followers join him in the abyss and create a third stronghold: Hell.

== Reception ==
In Issue 36 of Abyss, Eric Olson liked the book, writing, "[Brust] has surpassed himself with his most recent effort ... a very enjoyable story." Olson concluded, "I strongly recommend this book with the warning that if you are into classical swords and sorcery type fantasy, it may not be what you are looking for."

== Other reviews & commentary ==
- Science Fiction Chronicle, #60 (September 1984): Review by Don D'Ammassa
- Fantasy Review (November 1984): Review by Len Hatfield
- Fantasy Review (June 1985): Review by Martin A. Schneider
- Vector #213
