= Theodore of Octodurum =

See Theodulus, Théodule, Saint Theodore for disambiguation.

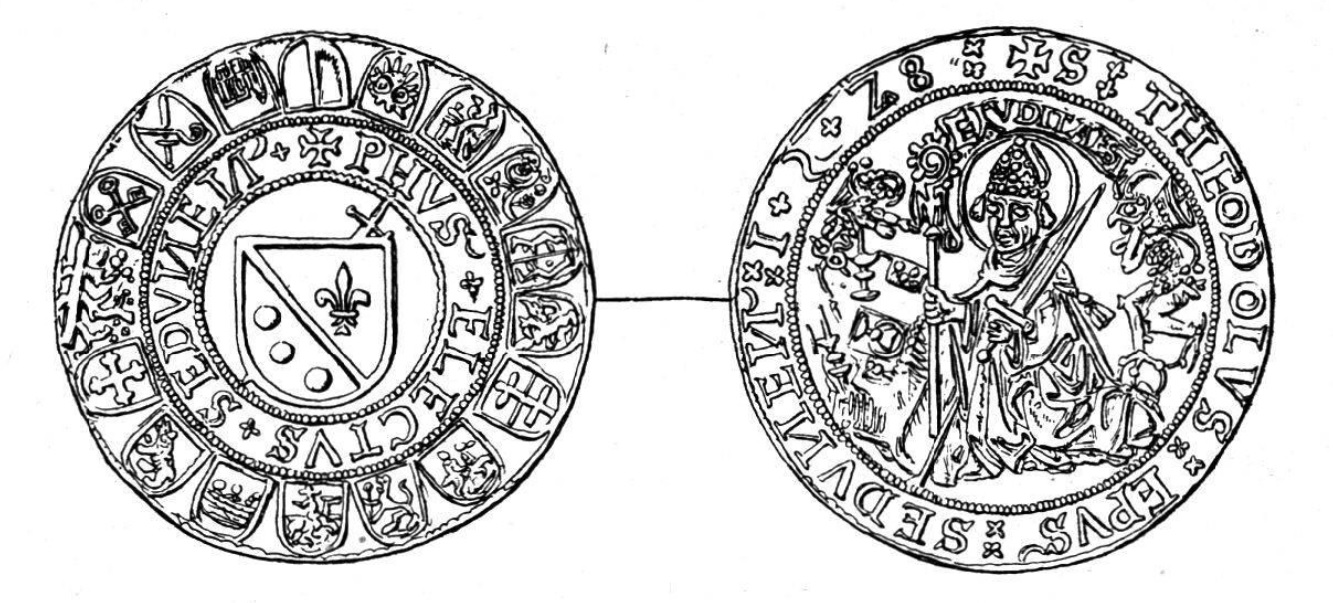
S[anctus] THEODOLUS EP[iscop]US SEDUNEN[sis], reverse of a Thaler minted under prince-bishop Philippe de Platea (1528)

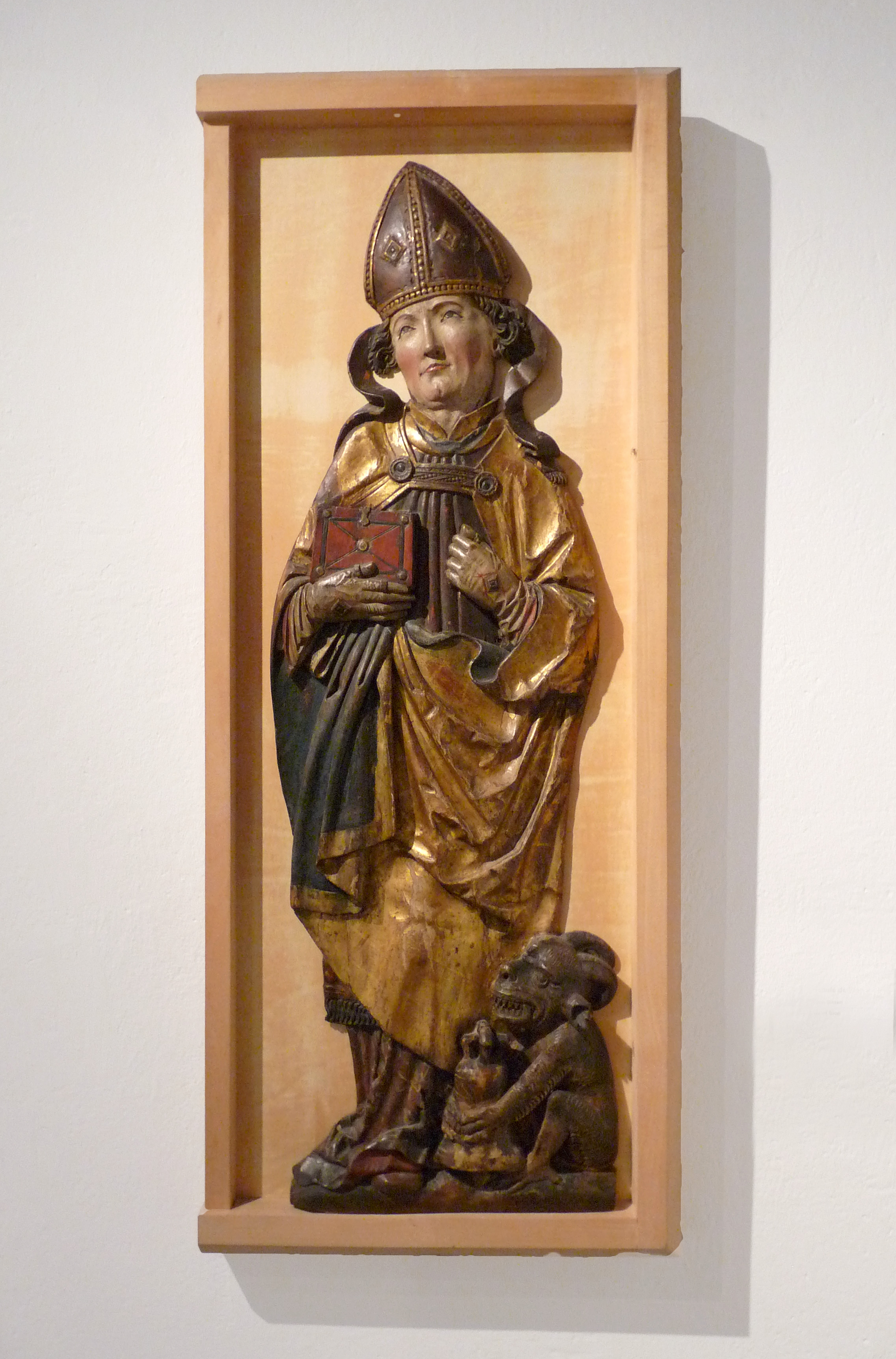
Late polychrome statue (Swabian master of c. 1500), fragment of an altar panel (Musée de l'Œuvre Notre-Dame, Strasbourg)

Saint Theodore of Octodurum (also of Sion, of Grammont; German Theodor von Sitten, locally Joder; also known as Theodulus, French Théodule, Latin Theodolus Sedunensis etc.; 4th century) is the first known bishop of Octodurum, Alpes Poeninae province (present-day Martigny, Valais, Switzerland). He is the patron saint of Valais and of the Walser. His feast day is 16 or 26 August.

He is known to have participated in the Council of Aquileia in 381, his presence being preserved on the attendance list as Theodorus Episcopus Octodorensis. He was also one of the signatories of a letter addressed by the Synod of Milan to Pope Siricius early in 390, informing him of their condemnation of the monk Jovinian and his followers. He is said to have discovered the tomb of Saint Maurice, at which place he established the Abbey of St. Maurice, Agaunum. Aloys Lütolf placed the beginning of his episcopate in the 340s, which would amount to a reign of more than forty years. At first, he would not have had a fixed seat and in some sources is known as "bishop of the Helvetians".

It is possible that three distinct historical bishops with the name Theodulus or Theodorus are venerated as a single saint.

1. The first would be the late 4th-century bishop recorded as Theodorus (fl. c. 350–400).
2. The second Theodorus/Theodulus is recorded for the year 515. It was at this time that the seat of the bishopric was moved from Martigny to Sion and the remains of the first Theodorus were transferred there.
3. A third and possibly legendary Theodore is recorded only in Acts written by a monk called Ruodpertus in c. the 12th century; he is said to have been installed as secular ruler of the Valais by Charlemagne in 805. The byname "of Grammont" properly only applies to this third Theodorus, who "in certain propria" is said to be a member of the baronial family of this name. The existence of the third Theodorus/Theodulus, "of Grammont", was first questioned in the Swiss Reformation, by Johann Stumpf (1546).

The relics of Theodore, transferred to Sion probably in the 6th century, were lost during the French occupation of 1798. There are also accounts of his relics being moved to Bischofszell and by Ulrich of Augsburg to Ottobeuren. His attribute is a devil bearing a bell. This represents a legend that the pope gifted a church bell to the saint, who forced the devil to carry the bell across Theodul Pass (formerly Matterjoch, the naming of the pass after the saint is a 17th-century tradition). According to legend, metal particles from this original bell of Sitten were used in the casting of later bells. Theodulhorn and Theodul Glacier are in turn named for Theodul Pass.

== Literature ==
- Kirsten Groß-Albenhausen: "Theodor (…), Bischof von Octodurus" In: Biographisch-Bibliographisches Kirchenlexikon 11 (1996), 881–884.
- E. F. Gelpke, Kirchengeschichte der Schweiz (1856–61) I.95ff, 120ff; II.97ff.
- E. F. Gelpke, "Theodulus" in: Johann Jakob Herzog (ed.) Real-encyklopädie für Protestantische Theologie und Kirche vol. 15 (1862), 738–743.
- H. Foerster, "Zur Vita sancti Theodori Sedunensis episcopi", Zeitschrift für schweizerische Kirchengeschichte 33 (1939), 233–240 (doi 10.5169/seals-125391).
- Acta Sanctorum, Augusti Tomus III [vol. 37] (1737) 275–280 (reprinted 1867).
