= Paul Yoder =

Paul Yoder may refer to:

- Paul P. Yoder (1897–1965), American legislator and state executive
- Paul V. Yoder (1908–1990), American musician

== See also ==
- Yoder (surname)
