= Henry Jacobs (disambiguation) =

Henry Jacobs (1924–2015) was an American humorist.

Henry Jacobs may also refer to:

- Henry Jacobs (priest) (1824–1901), first Dean of Christchurch, NZ
- Henry Eyster Jacobs (1844–1932), American religious figure and writer
- Henry P. Jacobs, American Baptist preacher, schools founder, and state legislator
- Henry Barton Jacobs, American physician and educator
- Henry S. Jacobs (1827–1893), Jamaican-American rabbi

== See also ==
- Harry Jacobs (disambiguation)
- Henry Jacob (1563–1624), English dissenter
