= Abdulla =

Abdullah may refer to:

- Abdulla, another form of the name Abdullah
- Arkin Abdulla, Uyhghur musician
- Abdul Samad Abdulla, Maldivian politician and the Minister of Foreign Affairs
- Shakhawan Abdulla, Iraqi politician
- Abdulla (1960 film), an Indian Hindi-language film

== See also ==
- Abdullah (disambiguation)
