= Demirbaş =

Demirbaş is a Turkish surname. Notable people with the surname include:

- Abdullah Demirbaş (born 1966), Turkish politician
- Hayrettin Demirbaş (born 1963), Turkish footballer and coach
- Taner Demirbaş (born 1978), Turkish footballer
