= Abdullah I =

Abdullah I may refer to:

- Abdullah ibn Muhammad al-Umawi (844–912), Emir of Córdoba
- Abdullah I of the Maldives, Sultan of the Maldives from 1374 to 1376
- Ignatius Abdullah I (r. 1521–1557), Syriac Orthodox patriarch of Antioch
- Abdullah I Al-Sabah (1740–1814)
- Abdullah bin Saud, leader of the House of Saud from 1814 to 1818
- Abdullah I of Jordan (1882–1951), emir of Transjordan (1921–1946), King of Transjordan (1946–1949), and King of the Hashemite Kingdom of Jordan (1949–1951)
- Abdallah I, Sultan of Anjouan

== See also ==
- Abdullah II (disambiguation)
- King Abdullah (disambiguation)
- Abdullah Khan (disambiguation)
- Abdullah (name)
- Abdullah (disambiguation)
