= Henry P. Jacobs =

Legislator and educator (1825–1899)

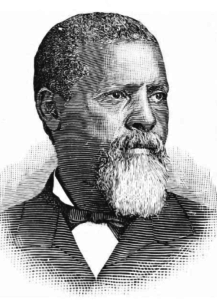

Henry P. Jacobs (July 8, 1825 – December 14, 1899) was an American politician and educator.

Jacobs was born in Alabama. He escaped slavery to Canada and then moved to Michigan before settling in Natchez, Mississippi after the American Civil War. He led Natchez Seminary, founded in 1877, the school that would later become Jackson State University. In 2010, Jackson State University president Ronald Mason Jr. proposed merging several historically Black colleges and universities into specialized campuses of a newly formed university called Jacobs State University in honor of Jacobs. He served with John R. Lynch and O. C. French in the Mississippi House of Representatives from Adams County, Mississippi.

In 2015, a mural was painted in Ypsilanti, Michigan in his honor.
