= Abdullah al Mamun =

Abdullah Al Mamun (Bengali: আব্দুল্লাহ আল-মামূন) is a Bengali given name. It may refer to:

- Abdullah al-Ma'mun (786-833), the seventh Abbasid caliph
- Abdullah Al-Mamun Suhrawardy (1877–1935), Bengali Islamic scholar, barrister, and academic
- Abdullah al Mamun (playwright) (1942–2008), Bangladeshi playwright, actor, and filmmaker
- Abdullah Al Mamun (reciter), (born 2003), Bangladeshi Quran memorizer, reciter, and instructor
- Mohammad Abdullah Al-Mamun (born 1956), Bangladeshi politician
- Chowdhury Abdullah Al-Mamun (born 1964), Bangladeshi police officer
- A. A. Mamun (Abdullah Al Mamun, born 1966), Bangladeshi physicist
- Abdullah Al Mamun Chowdhury, Bangladesh navy officer

== See also ==
- Abdullah (disambiguation)
- Al-Ma'mun (name)
