= Abda (biblical figure) =

The name Abda (Hebrew עַבְדָּא) means servant, or perhaps is an abbreviated form of servant of YHWH. There are two people by this name in the Hebrew Bible.

- An Abda mentioned in passing when Solomon set Adoniram son of Abda in charge of forced labor for Solomon's building projects (1 Kings 4:6). The forced labor is referred to by the word "levy" in the Revised Version and "tribute" in the King James Version.
- A Levite of the family of Jeduthun (Nehemiah 11:17), also called Obadiah (1 Chronicles 9:16). He was the son of Shammua and served in Jerusalem under Nehemiah.

Where the Masoretic Text has Abda, the Septuagint, depending on the location and manuscript, has names such as Abao, Ephra, Edram, Ioreb, Obeb, and Abdias.
