= Adoniram =

Tax collector in 1 Kings

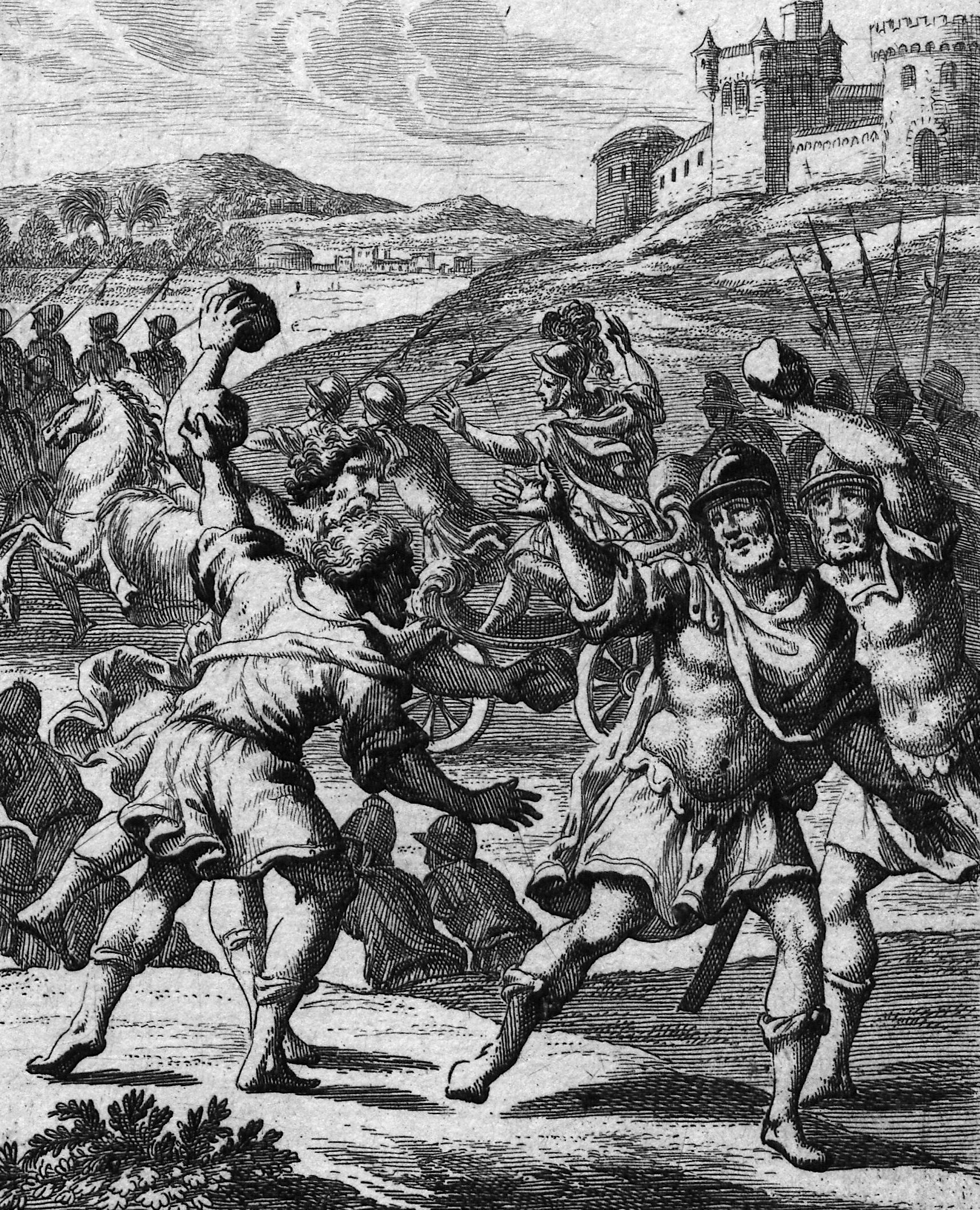
Woodcut depicting the stoning of Adoniram, by Johann Christoph Weigel, 1695

Adoniram (/ædəˈnaɪrəm/; Hebrew: אדונירם, 'my Lord has exalted'; alternate form Adoram, אדורם 'adoram, 'the Lord has exalted'), the son of Abda, was the tax collector in the United Kingdom of Israel for over forty years, from the late years of King David's reign until the reign of Rehoboam. In the language of the Tanakh, he was "over the tribute", i.e. the levy or forced labor.

He was in charge of conscripted timber cutters during the building of King Solomon's Temple.

According to the biblical narrative, he was stoned to death by the people of Israel when Rehoboam sent him in an attempt to collect taxes.
