= Abdullah Yılmaz =

Abdullah Yılmaz may refer to:

- Abdullah Yılmaz (football referee) (born 1978), Turkish football referee
- Abdullah Yılmaz (skier, born 1961), Turkish skier
- Abdullah Yılmaz (skier, born 2004), Turkish skier
