= HMS Abdiel =

Three ships of the Royal Navy have borne the name HMS Abdiel, after Abdiel, a seraph in Milton's Paradise Lost.

- HMS Abdiel (1915) was a Marksman-class destroyer, built as HMS Ithuriel but renamed before being launched in 1915. She was sold for scrapping in 1936.
- HMS Abdiel (M39) was an Abdiel-class minelayer launched in 1940 and sunk by a mine in 1943.
- HMS Abdiel (N21) was an exercise minelayer and mine countermeasures support ship launched in 1967 and broken up in 1988.
