= King Abdullah =

King Abdullah may refer to:

- Abdullah II of Jordan (born 1962), the king of Jordan since 1999
  - List of things named after King Abdullah II
- Abdullah I of Jordan (1882–1951), king of Transjordan
- Abdullah Khan II (1533/4–1598), ruler of the Khanate of Bukhara
- Abdullah of Pahang (born 1959), the Yang di-Pertuan Agong (King) of Malaysia and the Sultan of Pahang since 2019
- Abdullah of Saudi Arabia (1924–2015), king of Saudi Arabia
  - List of things named after Saudi kings#Abdullah

== See also ==
- Abdullah (disambiguation)
- Abdullah I (disambiguation)
- Abdullah II (disambiguation)
- Abdullah Khan (disambiguation)
