= Obadiah (given name) =

Biblical theophorical name

- Pronunciation: /ˌoʊbəˈdaɪ.ə/
- Gender: Male

Origin
- Origin: Hebrew
- Meaning: "servant of Yahweh"
- Region of origin: Eretz Israel

Other names
- Related names: Abdi, Abdiel, Abdeel, Abdullah, Obaidullah, Ovadia

Obadiah is a masculine given name. It is of Biblical Hebrew origin, and its popularity derives from Obadiah, a prophet in the Hebrew Bible and in the religious traditions of Christianity, Judaism, and Islam.

== Etymology ==
Obadiah (Hebrew: עֹבַדְיָה – ʿŌḇaḏyā or עֹבַדְיָהוּ – ʿŌḇaḏyāhū; "servant of Yah") is a biblical theophorical name, meaning "servant or slave of Yahweh" or "worshiper of Yahweh." The Greek form of the name used in the Septuagint is Obdios. In Latin it is translated as Abdias while in Arabic it is either ʿAbdullah (عبد الله), Ubaydah (عبيده), or Ubaidullah (عبیدالله) "Slave of God". The Bishops' Bible refers to the prophet with this name as Abdi. The name is related to "Abdeel", "servant of God", which is also cognate to the Arabic name "Abdullah" or "Obaidullah". The equivalent Turkish name is Abdil or Abdi.

== Biblical figures ==
- Obadiah – Biblical prophet
- Obadiah (1 Kings), head of King Aab's household who announces the return of Elijah. According to the rabbinic tradition, the tradition of the Eastern Orthodox and Oriental Orthodox Churches, this is the same individual as the prophet.
- the son of Hananiah, a descendant of king David of Israel through Solomon
- the son of Uzzi, a descendant of the Hebrew patriarch Issachar
- the son of Azel, a descendant of King Saul of Israel through Jonathan
- the son of Shemaiah, a descendant of the Hebrew patriarch Levi
- a warrior of the Tribe of Gad who served King David
- the father of Ishmaiah, governor of the tribe of Zebulun during the reign of King David
- a prince of the southern kingdom of Judah during the reign of King Jehoshaphat
- a Levite, overseer of the reconstruction efforts during the reforms of King Josiah of Judah
- the son of Joab, one of the individuals who returned from the Babylonian captivity with the priestly scribe Ezra, and possibly the Levite mentioned in Nehemiah 12:25 as a porter of Jerusalem's gates after the city's reconstruction under Nehemiah

== People ==
=== Pre-17th century ===
Ordered chronologically.

- Obadiah (Khazar), late eighth or early ninth century Khazar ruler
- Obadiah the Proselyte, early-12th-century Italian convert to Judaism, writer and musician
- Obadiah of Bertinoro (c. 1450?–c. 1516 or earlier), Italian rabbi best known for his popular commentary on the Mishnah
- Obadiah ben Jacob Sforno (c. 1475–1550), Italian rabbi, Biblical commentator, philosopher and physician

=== 17th century to the present ===
Ordered alphabetically.

- Obadiah Bowne (1822–1874), American politician
- Obadiah Bruen Brown (1779–1852), American Baptist clergyman, Chaplain of the House and Chaplain of the Senate
- Obadiah Bull, said to have been Irish lawyer who practised in London during the reign of Henry VII (1485–1509) and allegedly inspiration for the expression "That's a Bull"
- Obadiah Bush (1797–1851), American prospector and businessman, an ancestor of the Bush political family
- Obadiah Carter (1925–1994), American musician, member of the "5" Royales R&B group
- Obadiah Elliott (1763–1838), British inventor
- Obadiah Gardner (1852–1938), American politician, US Senator from Maine
- Obadiah German (1766–1842), American lawyer and politician, US Senator from New York
- Obadiah Grew (1607–1689), English nonconformist minister
- Obadiah Holmes (1610–1682), early Rhode Island settler and Baptist minister whipped for his religious beliefs and activism
- Obadiah Hughes (1695–1751), English Presbyterian minister
- Obadiah Johnson (1849–1920), author and the second Nigerian to qualify as a medical doctor
- Obadiah Kariuki (1902–1978), Kenyan Anglican bishop
- Obadiah Moyo, Zimbabwean politician and former hospital administrator, disgraced ex-Minister of Health and Child Care (2018–2020)
- Obadiah Newnham (1848–1932), Anglican Archdeacon of Fredericton, Canada
- Obadiah Rich (1777–1850), American diplomat, bibliophile and bibliographer
- Obadiah Short (1803–1886), British amateur landscape painter
- Obadiah Shuttleworth (died 1734), English composer, violinist and organist
- Obadiah Tarumbwa (born 1985), Zimbabwean footballer
- Obadiah Titus (1789–1854), American politician
- Obi Toppin (born 1998), American National Basketball Association player
- Obadiah Wheelock (1738–1807), Nova Scotia politician
- Obediah Wilchcombe (1959–2023), Bahamian politician
- Obadiah Wills (1625–?), English clergyman, theologian and paedobaptist who critiqued John Bunyan's position on baptism

== Fictional characters ==
- Obadiah Archer, a superhero in the Valiant Comics universe
- Obadiah Hakeswill, in the Richard Sharpe series of novels and films
- Obadiah Elihue Parker, protagonist of the Flannery O'Connor short story "Parker's Back"
- Obadiah Slope, in Anthony Trollope's novel Barchester Towers
- Obadiah Stane, main antagonist of the 2008 film Iron Man, played by Jeff Bridges
