= Al-Ma'mun (name) =

Al-Ma'mun المأمون
- Pronunciation: al-Ma'mun; Mamun
- Gender: Male

Origin
- Origin: Semitic (Arabic)
- Meaning: Trustworthy, Trusted, Reliable.
- Region of origin: Arabia (Middle East)

Al-Ma'mun (Arabic: المأمون) means 'trustworthy', 'trusted', and 'reliable'. People with the name include:

- Al-Ma'mun, seventh Abbasid caliph, ruling from 813 to his death in 833
- Ma'mun I ibn Muhammad (died 997), Khwarazmshah
- Ma'mun II (died 1017), Khwarazmshah
- al-Ma'mun al-Bata'ihi (died 1128), vizier to the Fatimid caliph al-Amir
- al-Mamun of Toledo (died 1075), Taifa king and a member of the Banu Dil-Nun dynasty
- Idris al-Ma'mun (died 1232), was a rival Almohad ruler who reigned from 1229 to 1232

== See also ==
- Abdullah al Mamun (disambiguation)
