= Mohammed Abdullah =

Mohammed Abdullah or Mohammad Abdullah may refer to:

- Mohammad Abdullah (academic) (born 1937), Bangladeshi politician
- Mohammad Abdullah (footballer) (born 1997), Bangladeshi footballer
- Mohammad Abdullah (politician), Bangladeshi politician
- Mohammed Abdullah Al-Ajmi (born 1971), Kuwaiti politician
- Mohammed Abdullah al-Senussi (1981–2011), Libyan fighter
- Mohammed Abdullah al-Shahwani (born 1938), Iraqi general
- Muhammad Abdullah Ghazi (1935–1998), Pakistani Islamic scholar
- Mohammed Abdullah Azam (born 1970), British citizen convicted of terrorist activities
- Mohammed Abdullah Hassan (1856–1920), Somali leader
- Mohammed Abdullah Saleh (1939–2001), Yemeni major general and brother of former President Ali Abdullah Saleh
- Mohammed Abdulla Hassan Mohamed (born 1978), Emirati football referee
- Sheikh Abdullah (1905–1982), Indian statesman
- Mohammad Al Gergawi (born 1963), Emirati politician
- Twink (musician) (born 1944), English drummer, singer, and songwriter
- Muhammad Abdullah (academic) (1932–2008)
- Muhammed Abdullah of Johol (born 1966), Undang of Johol, Negeri Sembilan, Malaysia

== See also ==
- Abdullah (name)
- Muhammad (name)
- Muhammad Abdul (disambiguation)
- Mohamed Abdullah (disambiguation)
