= Abdullah II (disambiguation) =

Abdullah II (born 1962) has been King of Jordan since 1999.

Abdullah II or Abdallah II may also refer to:

- Abdallah II of Ifriqiya (died 903), Emir of Ifriqiya, 902–903
- Abdullah II of Kanem (died c. 1322), Mai of the Kanem–Bornu Empire, c. 1311–1322
- Abdullah II of the Maldives, Sultan of the Maldives, 1388
- Abdullah Khan II (1533–1598), Khan of the Bukhara Khanate, 1583–1598
- Abdallah al-Ghalib II (died c. 1623), Sultan of Marrakesh, 1606–1609, and Sultan of Fes, 1609–1613
- Abdullah II bin Hashim, Sharif of Mecca, 1696
- Abdullah II Al-Sabah (c. 1814–1892), Emir of Kuwait, 1866–1892
- Ignatius Abdullah II (1833–1915), Patriarch of Antioch, 1906–1915
- Abdullah Muhammad Shah II of Perak (1842–1922), Sultan of Perak, 1874–1877, also called Abdullah II
- 'Abd Allah II ibn 'Ali 'Abd ash-Shakur (c. 1850s–1930), Emir of Harar, 1884–1887

== See also ==
- Abdullah (disambiguation)
- Abdullah I (disambiguation)
- Abdullah Khan (disambiguation)
- King Abdullah (disambiguation)
