= Abdalla El-Masri =

Lebanese-Russian composer

Abdallah Hani El Masri عبدالله هاني المصري (born 1962, Beirut) is a Lebanese-Russian composer, now resident in Kuwait, of mostly orchestral and chamber works that have been performed in Africa, Europe and the Middle East.

== Life and career ==
El-Masri studied guitar with Isaa Escaf at a music school in Hammana from 1977 to 1979 and studied guitar and music theory with Joseph Ashkhanyan at the Centre Culturel Espagnol in Beirut from 1979 to 1982. He then studied composition with Konstantin Batashov and Roman Ledenyov, theory and harmony with Yuri Vorontsov and Yuri Kholopov and orchestration with Nikolai Rakov at the Tchaikovsky Conservatory in Moscow from 1982 to 1993, where he earned his MFA in 1991 and DMus in 1993.

Among his honors is an honorable mention in the young composers competition of the Tchaikovsky Conservatory (1988). He has been an active member of the Russian Composers Union since 1998. His music has been performed in Egypt, France, Germany, Kuwait, Lebanon, Russia, and Switzerland.

El-Masri is also active in other positions. He founded the vocal ensemble Al-Jabal in 1977 and wrote songs for it from 1977 to 1982. Later he founded the vocal ensemble Al-Wilada in 1984, which performed in Germany and Russia, and disbanded in 1990. In addition, he has written the books Practical Course of Orchestration (1995, Kuwait Higher Institute of Music) and Instruments of the Orchestra (2001, Conservatoire National Supérieur de Musique de Beirut) and traditional harmony book "TANAGHOM AL ALHAN تناغم الالحان" (Kuwait, Sofia library 2020)

As a guitarist, he worked with the Al Mayadeen vocal ensemble (directed by Marcel Khalife) from 1977 to 1982 and also arranged music for this group. He was also active as a guitarist in various ensembles in Lebanon from 1979 to 1982 and toured Europe and the US in 1982. He has taught composition at both the Kuwait Higher Institute of Music in Kuwait City and PAAET Kuwait since 1994. He has also lectured in Kuwait and Russia.

One of his most notable pupils a multi stylist Kuwaiti contemporary classical music composer is Abdulaziz Shabakouh.

In addition to the works listed below, El-Masri has composed much stage music.

== Complete list of works ==
=== Orchestral ===
- Samaii, nay, riqq, string orchestra, 1983-86 (section of In Arabic Mood II; may be performed separately);
- Symphony No. 1, 1991;
- Symphony No. 2, 1994;
- Violin Concerto, 2001;
- Piano Concerto, 2003;
- "Matar" for mezzo-soprano, piano choir and orchestra, 2010;
- Oud Concerto, 2011
- Cello Concerto, 2012
- Symphony no. 3, 2016;
- Symphony no. 4 (Reflections), 2021
- two prayer (requiem song to Beirut) and (minute prayer to Bassam Saba) for strings Orchestra and French horn, 2020
- a shildren's calendar (in old Style) for orchestra, 2020

=== Chamber music ===
- Sonata, violin, piano, 1985;
- String Quartet, 1985–86;
- Quintet, clarinet, harp, violin, viola, cello, 1986;
- Suite, flute, piano, 1986;
- In Arabic Mood I, 1986-87 (each of its four sections may be performed separately: [1] flute, clarinet, bassoon; [2] string quartet; [3] oboe, violin, cello, piano; [4] 2 trumpets, 2 trombones);
- Three Moods, E-flat clarinet, clarinet, bass clarinet, basset horn, 1988;
- Elegy, violin, cello, piano, 1989;
- Guitar Quartet, 4 guitars, 1996
- "JIMALI WALI" THEME FROM IRAQI FOLK SONG, 2002
- piano Sonata 2020

=== Choral ===
- In Arabic Mood II (vocalise), 1983-86 (each of its two sections may be performed separately: [1] Samaii, nay, riqq, string orchestra; [2] small mixed chorus, string orchestra)

=== Vocal ===
- Poème (text by Paul Shaul), baritone, cello, piano, 1987;
- "Matar" for mezzo-soprano, piano and orchestra (choral Ad.lib), 2010;
