= Abdiel Vázquez =

Mexican pianist (born 1984)

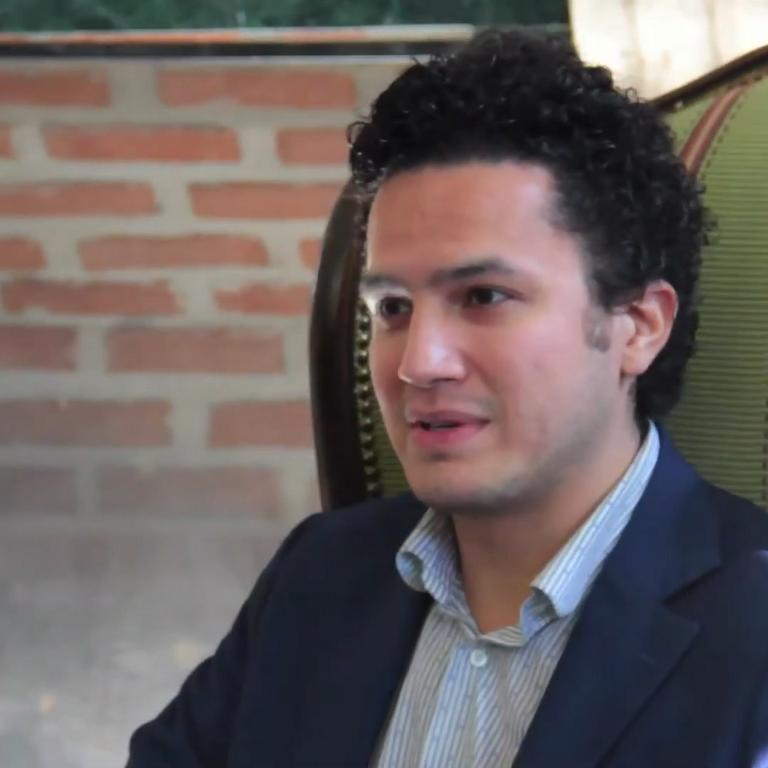
Abdiel Vázquez in 2017.

Abdiel Vazquez (born 1984) is a Mexican pianist who has won major awards for his playing both in Mexico City and in New York. Vazquez grew up just outside the city of Monterrey in the family of a doctor and an engineer. He began studying the piano at age six, but his parents did not realize the extent of his talent until he won his first competition at the age of twelve. Vazquez did his professional studies at the Escuela Superior de Música y Dance de Monterrey, and after receiving a scholarship, went on to the Manhattan School of Music, then studied privately in Madrid. He currently lives in New York, working as a vocal coach with the Metropolitan Opera House and Juilliard School. In 2006, he won the Angelica Morales-Yamaha National Piano Competition, his debut at the Palacio de Bellas Artes, and in 2013 he won the Shining Stars Debut Series, his debut at Carnegie Hall.

== Life ==
Abdiel Vazquez (full name Abdiel Antonio Vázquez Fortozo) was born in Monterrey, in 1984, and grew up in the small suburb down of Guadalupe, one of the three children of Oscar Vazquez, an engineer and Diana Fortozo.

His grandfather was a laborer, but his father was able to put himself through school working in Monterrey's steel industry. His middle-class upbringing allowed for musical studies for all of the children but only Abdiel has made it a profession. When he was little, he always tried to look taller in order to play with the older children in the park, according to his father. Vazquez began taking piano lessons at age six with Myrna Treviño. His father stated that the family knew he could play well, but did not understand the extent of his talent until he won his first piano competition, the Sala Beethoven, when Vazquez was 12.

Vazquez's professional studies were at the Escuela Superior de Música y Dance de Monterrey, with primary instructor Gerardo Gonzalez. For his final exam, Vazquez chose a piece that his instructor told him would take year to prepare for.

His talent began to be recognized even while in school, with several awards and finally a scholarship from the Fondo Nacional para la Cultura y las Artes. Vazquez moved on to New York to study at the Manhattan School of Music, under James Tocco. He furthered his studied for eight months in Madrid in 2012 with Oxana Yablanskaia of the Tchaikovsky Conservatory in Moscow and the Juilliard School.

In 2009, he founded the Juventud Sinfónica de Monterrey (Monterrey Symphony Youth), to support young musicians in his hometown and remains its founding director. This program has graduated over sixty former members who now play in various parts of Mexico.

When not on the road, Vazquez lives in New York, where he is a vocal coach at the Manhattan School of Music, working with singers from the Metropolitan Opera House and Juilliard School. He also founded the Little Chopins piano school for children there. He practices on average between seven and eight hours a day including weekends, with a minimum of two.

Vazquez has a history of playing benefit concerts starting while he was still in school. He particularly supports the families of miners in his home state of Nuevo Leon, through a charity set up for the families of more than 65 miners killed and injured in an accident at a Monterrey area mine, with the last benefit concert in 2013.

He has also played for charity, such as a benefit for the workers of a mine in Nuevo Leon, where an accident took the lives of 65 workers in 2013.

Vazquez is a fan of Romantic literature and of writers such as Victor Hugo, Goethe and Shakespeare. He believes that reading does not directly affect playing, but does enrich the person who plays.

== Performances ==
Vazquez made his debut as a soloist with the National Symphony Orchestra of Mexico at the Palacio de Bellas Artes when he was 21 years old. Since then he has appeared regularly with all of Mexico's major orchestras, such as Mexico State Symphonic Orchestra, the Mexico City Philharmonic, Jalisco Philharmonic Orquestra, the Carlos Chávez Symphonic Orchestra, the Querétaro Philharmonic, the Aguascalientes Philharmonic, the Sinaloa Symphonic Orchestra, the Yucatán Symphonic Orchestra, the symphonic orchestras of the universities of Nuevo León and Tamaulipas. He has performed at the Palacio de Bellas Artes since his debut, and appeared at the Festival Internacional Cervantino twice (2010 and 2014). He has also performed solo at the International Youth Symphonic Festival.

Outside of Mexico, Vazquez has performed in the United States, South America and Europe. He made his debut in the United States with the Youth Orchestras of San Antonio and in South America with the National Symphony of Peru and in Europe with the Mihail Jorá Philharmonic Orchestra in Bacau, Romania. He has competed in international events such as the Viña del Mar International Competition, the Fulbright Concerto Competition in Arkansas, Artists International Presentations of New York, the Cittá di Cantu in Italy and the Gabala International Competition in Azerbaijan. He debuted with the Louisiana Philharmonic Orchestra during their 2014–2015 season. In 2015, he held a private recital with soprano Maria Katzarava at Guildhall in London for that city's mayor and the president of Mexico.

== Awards ==
Even before finishing his conservatory studies, Vazquez had won a number of awards for his artistry, including the Nuevo Leon State Youth Award (2004), the National Youth Award from the Mexican president Vicente Fox (2006), the Medalla al Mérito Ciudadano (Civic Merit Medal, 2007) .

His first win at a major competition was the 2006, Angelica Morales-Yamaha National Piano Competition, playing Rachmaninoff's Third Piano Concerto. In 2010, he won the José Jacinto Cuevas National Piano Competition, and placed third at the Manuel M. Ponce International Competition.

In 2013, he won the first edition of The World Competition, an international music competition held entirely online. That same year he won his first major international competition, the Shining Stars Debut Series, which was also his debut at Carnegie Hall in New York, playing Manuel Ponce’s Piano Concerto.

== Artistry ==
Influences on Vazquez's development include Gerardo González, James Tocco, and Oxana Yablonskaya; the conductor David Gilbert, and the mezzo-soprano Mignon Dunn. He says that his favorite composer is who he happens to be playing at the moment, and his repertoire includes works by Beethoven, Grieg, Saint-Saens, Tchaikovsky, Prokofiev, Ravel, Poulenc, Gershwin, Barber, Castro, and Ponce, but works by Franz Liszt and Sergei Rachmaninoff are particularly common.
