= Muhammad Abd al-Halim Abd Allah =

Egyptian writer (1913–1970)

- محمد عبد الحليم عبد الله
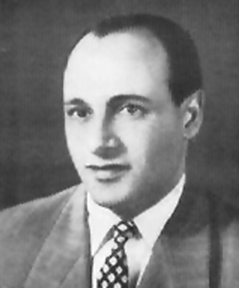
- Shown circa 1950
- Born: 3 February 1913; Kafr Bulin, Beheira Egypt
- Died: 30 June 1970 (aged 57); Cairo, Egypt
- Title: Writer, novelist

Muhammad Abd al-Halim Abd Allah (Arabic: محمد عبدالحليم عبدالله) (1970–1913), was an Egyptian author, writer, and a novelist. He was born on February 3, 1913, in the village of Kafr Bulin, Kom Hamada Center, Beheira Governorate. He became one of the symbols of the novel in modern Arabic literature. His literary works were mostly transformed into cinematic films because of the richness of the events, characters and the surrounding environment ... Which are the characteristics that distinguished his work from other novelists in his generation, such as the series about his novel Female Foundling (original text: Luqita) and the series about his novel Ivy Tree (original text: shajarat allablab), in addition to the series For the rest of the time (original text: lil zaman baqia). Two films were also created from his novels The Promised Night (original text: allayla almaweuda) and The Olive Branch (original text: ghasn alzaytun).

== Early life ==
He graduated from the Dar Al Uloom High School in 1937. His first story was published while he was still a student in 1933. After his graduation he worked as an editor for the magazine "The Arabic Language Academy" until he became editor in chief of the magazine. He was known as one of the best contemporary novel writers. He died on June 30, 1970. A literary library was established in his name in his village of Kafr Bulin, which is affiliated with Kom Hamada in the Buhaira governorate. Also a museum was established next to his tomb in his village, and the most prominent thing in the museum is the first manuscript of his story “Gharam Ha'ir”.

== Works ==
1. After Sunset (original text: baed alghurub)
2. Autumn sun (original text: shams alkharif)
3. The Virgin Heaven (original text: aljanat aleadhra)
4. For the rest of the time (original text: lil zaman baqia)
5. Ivy Tree (original text: shajarat allablab)
6. Colors of happiness (original text: 'alwan min alsaeada)
7. Things to remember (original text: 'ashya' lildhikraa)
8. Truth Seeker (original text: albahith ean alhaqiqa)
1. The Silent House (original text: albayt alsaamat)
2. Mute Tears (original text: aldumue alkhurasa')
3. Black braid (original text: aldafirat alsawda')
4. The past does not return (original text: almadi la yaeud)
5. West window (original text: alnaafidhat algharbia)
6. The other face (original text: alwajh alakhar)
7. The white scarf (original text: alwshah al'abyad)
8. Juliet on the moon (original text: jwlyyt fawq sath alqamar)
1. The brink of crime (original text: hafat aljarima)
2. A dream at the end of the night (original text: hulm akhar allayl)
3. Strands of light (original text: khuyut alnuwr)
4. The Still the storm (original text: sukun aleasifa)
5. The stranger's comeback (original text: eawdat algharib)
6. The Olive Branch (original text: ghasn alzaytun)
7. Female Foundling (original text: Luqita)
8. Passion Night (original text: laylat ghuram)

He also wrote many short stories. He translated many of his works into Persian, English, French, Italian, Chinese and German. Most of his novels were turned into films and TV series. Among the most famous critics who dealt with his works is Professor Dr. Helmi Mohamed Al-Qaoud in his book The Impossible Sunset (original text: alghurub almustahil).

== Awards ==
Muhammad Abd al-Halim Abd Allah received several awards, the most significant of which are:

- Linguistic Synod Prize for his story "Luqita" in 1947.
- Ministry of Education Prize for the story "Shajarat allablab" in 1949.
- Prize of the Department of Public Culture at the Ministry of Education for his novel "Baed alghurub" in 1949
- The State Incentive Award for the story "Shams alkharif" in 1953.
- The late President Anwar Sadat also gifted Muhammad Abdullah the Order of the Republic.
- The Arab Writers Union chose his novel "Baed alghurub", among the top 100 Arab novels.
