= Mamoun (name) =

Name list

Mamoun or Mamun may refer to the following people

== Given name ==
Mamoun

- Maumoon Abdul Gayoom (born 1937), politician from Maldives
- Mamoun Beheiry (1925–2002), Sudanese economist
- Mamoun Darkazanli (born 1958), German-Syrian terrorist
- Mamoun Elyounoussi (born 1987), Dutch actor
- Mamoun Fandy, Egyptian-born American scholar
- Mamoun Hassan, British screenwriter, director, editor and producer
- Mamoun Sakkal, Syrian artist and calligrapher

Mamun

- Mamun Chowdhury (born 1961), Bangladeshi-born British businessman
- Mamun Khan (born 1985), Bangladeshi football player
- Mamun Mahmud (1928–1971), Bangladeshi police officer

== Surname ==
Mamoun

- Guy Bertrand Ngon Mamoun (born 1983), Cameroonian football player
- Hassan Mamoun (1894–1973), Egyptian jurist, Grand Imam and Grand Mufti
- Rania Mamoun (born 1979), Sudanese journalist, novelist and writer
- Marella Mamoun (born 1982), Syrian Olympic swimmer
- Mohammed esh Sheikh el Mamun, 17th century Sultan of Morocco
- Saad Mamoun (1922–2000), Egyptian military officer

Mamun

- Margarita Mamun (born 1995), Russian-Bengali rhythmic gymnast
- Mohd Mamun Miah (born 1987), Bangladeshi football player
- Nasir Ali Mamun (born 1953), Bangladeshi portrait photographer

== Compound names with the element Mamun ==
- Abdullah al Mamun (disambiguation), multiple people
  - Al-Ma'mun (Abū Jaʿfar Abdullāh al-Ma'mūn ibn Hārūn al-Rashīd, 786-833), Abbasid caliph
- Mamunul Haque (born 1973), Bangladeshi Islamic scholar
- Mamunul Islam Mamun (born 1988), Bangladeshi international footballer
- Mam'mun al-Rashid, multiple people
  - Mamunur Rashid Khan (born 1948), Bangladeshi actor, director and scriptwriter
  - Mamunur Rashid Kiron (born 1961), Bangladeshi politician and businessman
  - Md. Mamunoor Rashid (born 1968), Bangladeshi politician
