= Abdullah İçel =

Turkish-Belgian futsal player

Abdullah İçel (also known as Abdoullah Icel in Belgium) (born January 12, 1982) is a Turkish-Belgian futsal player. He currently plays and previously played for Alliance Ecaussines, Arenberg FC Enghien, Newpers Anderlues and Paraske Bowl Morlanwelz.

He is a member of the Turkey national futsal team in the UEFA Futsal Championship.
