= Chathuranga Madushan =

Sri Lankan footballer

Personal information
- Full name: Chathuranga Sanjeewa Madushan
- Date of birth: 9 August 1993 (age 33)
- Place of birth: Sri Lanka
- Height: 1.81 m (5 ft 11 in)
- Position: Defender

Team information
- Current team: Navy Sea Hawks

Senior career*
Years	Team	Apps	(Gls)
2015–2018	Navy SC Colombo		
2018–	Navy Sea Hawks		

International career^{‡}
2016 –	Sri Lanka	3	(0)
- * Club domestic league appearances and goals as of 18:36, 10 September 2021 (UTC) ‡ National team caps and goals as of 18:36, 10 September 2021 (UTC)

Chathuranga Sanjeewa Madushan is a Sri Lankan international footballer who plays as a defender for Navy Sea Hawks in the Sri Lanka Football Premier League.
