= Abdullah Al Thani =

Abdullah Al Thani may refer to:

== In Libya ==
- Abdullah al-Thani (born 1954), House of Representatives prime minister of Libya

== In Qatar ==
- Abdullah bin Ali Al Thani, Qatari royal
- Abdullah bin Jassim Al Thani (1880–1948), ruler of Qatar 1913–1940
- Abdullah bin Khalid Al Thani (born 1956), Qatari politician
- Abdullah bin Khalifa Al Thani (born 1958), Qatari politician
- Abdullah bin Nasser bin Abdullah Al Ahmed Al Thani (born 1969), Qatari businessman
- Abdullah bin Nasser bin Khalifa Al Thani (born 1965), Qatari royal and politician
- Abdullah bin Mohammed bin Saud Al Thani, Qatari royal
