= Abdullah Al Mamun Chowdhury =

Bangladeshi admiral

- Born: 5 August 1967 (age 58)
- Allegiance: Bangladesh
- Branch: Bangladesh Navy
- Service years: 1987 – 2025
- Rank: Rear Admiral
- Commands: Assistant Chief of Naval Staff (Personnel); Assistant Chief of Naval Staff (Logistics); Chairman of Payra Port Authority; Commander, Chittagong Naval Area (COMCHIT); Director, Naval Submarines; Commander, Submarine (COMSUB); Commander, Naval Administrative Authority Dhaka; Commodore, BNS Shaikat
- Awards: Bisishtho Sheba Padak (BSP); Commendation Padak

Abdullah Al Mamun Chowdhury is a retired two-star admiral in Bangladesh Navy who has served as assistant chief of naval staff (personnel). Previously, he has served as chairman of Payra Port Authority twice. Before that he served as commander, Chattogram Naval Area. Prior to that, he was assistant chief of naval staff (logistics). He also served as director of submarines, Naval Headquarters, Dhaka.

== Career ==
Chowdhury joined Bangladesh Navy in 1985 and was commissioned in Executive Branch. He served as Bhasanchar project director, the relocation of Rohingya refugees to Bhasanchar Island on the southern tip of Noakhali. During his time, almost 20 thousand Rohingya has been shifted. He oversaw the process of shifting Rohingya people from Kutupalong refugee camp to Island of Noakhali. Before that, Chowdhury was director of Naval Administrative Authority Dhaka. Admiral Mamun became 1st in merit position in 64th Senior Staff Course at Bangladesh Public Administration Training Centre (BPATC).

== Personal life ==
Chowdhury is married to Aleya Akhter who is a professor of economics at Govt Titumir College (14th BCS). He is the father of a daughter and a son.
