= Abu Makhlad Abdallah =

Iranian statesman from Tabaristan

Abu Makhlad Abdallah ibn Yahya al-Tabari was an Iranian statesman from Tabaristan, who served the Ziyarid ruler Mardavij (r. 930–935), and later the Buyid ruler of Iraq, Mu'izz al-Dawla (r. 945–967). He might have been the son of Ali Yahya ibn Abdallah al-Tabari, a secretary who served the Baridis of Basra.

== Sources ==
- Donohue, John J. (2003). The Buwayhid Dynasty in Iraq 334 H./945 to 403 H./1012: Shaping Institutions for the Future. Leiden and Boston: Brill. ISBN 90-04-12860-3.
- Madelung, W. (1969). The Assumption of the Title Shāhānshāh by the Būyids and "The Reign of the Daylam (Dawlat Al-Daylam)". Vol. 28. Journal of Near Eastern Studies, vol. 28, no. 2. pp. 84–108. doi:10.1086/371995. ISBN 0857731815. JSTOR 543315. S2CID 159540778.
