= Abdallah Saaf =

Moroccan academic and politician (born 1949)

Minister of Education
- In office 2000–2002
- Prime Minister: Abderrahmane Youssoufi

Personal details
- Born: 19 September 1949 (age 77) Kenitra, Morocco
- Party: Socialist Union of Popular Forces
- Children: 3
- Education: University of Rabat; University of Paris II

Abdallah Saaf (born 1949) is a Moroccan political scientist and academic who was the minister of education between 2000 and 2002. He taught at different universities in Morocco and is the professor at the Faculty of Governance, Economic and Social Sciences of the Mohammed VI Polytechnic University (UM6P), professor emeritus of political sciences at Mohammed V University and director of the Center for Studies in Social Sciences Research.

== Early life and education ==
Abdallah Saaf was born in Kenitra, Morocco, on 19 September 1949. He graduated from the University of Paris II and from the University of Rabat (today Mohammed V University) receiving a degree in law. He completed his PhD studies in public law in 1978.

== Career ==
Following his graduation, Saaf taught at different universities and held several academic administrative posts. He joined a leftist party, Organization of the Popular Democratic Action (OADP), founded in 1983. It was part of the Socialist Union of Popular Forces. In 1998, he was named as the deputy minister of technical and secondary education, which post he held until 2000. In 2000 he was appointed minister of education and was in office until 2002. He served in these roles in the cabinet led by Prime Minister Abderrahmane Youssoufi.

In 2011, immediately following the events across Arab countries known as Arab Spring, Saaf was elected as a member of the commission that drafted the revisions of the Constitution of Morocco. He is the founder of the Moroccan Association of Political Science. He has worked as faculty member at the Mohammed VI Polytechnic University and is the professor emeritus of political sciences at Mohammed V University. He is also director of the Center for Studies in Social Sciences Research.

=== Work ===
In addition to his publications on political sciences, Saaf published books about his daily bus journeys in Rabat. The first one was Carnets de bus, published by Bus Notebooks in 1999. The other one was translated into English under the title A Significant Year in 2021.
