= Théodule =

Théodule or Theodule is the French form of the given name Theodulus. It may refer to:

- Nicolas Anne Théodule Changarnier (1793–1877), French general, born at Autun
- Théodule Devéria (died 1871), prominent French egyptologist who lived in the 19th century
- Théodule Meunier (died 1907), French anarchist responsible for a series of bombings in Paris, France in 1892
- Théodule Ribot (1823–1891), French realist painter
- Théodule Tellier (1855–1922), French printer and the co-founder of French philatelic publisher Yvert et Tellier
- Théodule-Armand Ribot (1839–1916), French psychologist
