= Muhammad 'Abd al-Wahhab =

Muhammad 'Abd al-Wahhab may refer to:

- Muhammad ibn Abd al-Wahhab (1703–1792), Arab Islamic scholar
- Muhammad bin Abdul Wahhab Al Faihani (1863–1906), Bahraini merchant and trader who also served as Ottoman governor of Darin village
- Mohammed Abdel Wahab (1902–1991), Egyptian singer
- Muhammad Abdul Wahhab (1923–2018), Pakistani Islamic preacher
- Mohamed Abdelwahab Abdelfattah (born 1962), Egyptian composer
- Mohamed Abdelwahab (1983–2006), Egyptian footballer
