= Abdollah, Yazd =

Abdollah عبداله
- Village
- Location within Iran
- Coordinates: 31°35′37″N 53°41′07″E
- Country: Iran
- Province: Yazd
- County: Taft
- Bakhsh: Central
- Rural District: Dehshir

Population (2006)
  - Total: 294
- Time zone: UTC+3:30 (IRST)
  - Summer (DST): UTC+4:30 (IRDT)

Abdollah (Persian: عبداله, also Romanized as ‘Abdollāh; also known as ‘Abdullah) is a village in Dehshir Rural District, in the Central District of Taft County, Yazd Province, Iran. At the 2006 census, its population was 294, in 112 families.
