= Abdullah al-Amiri =

Iraqi judge

Abdullah al-Amiri (/əbˈdʌlə æl əˈmiːri/ əb-DUL-ə al ə-MEE-ree;) was a judge in the trial of Iraqi former president Saddam Hussein who was replaced after allegations of bias.
