= Yoder =

Swiss German surname

Yoder is a surname of Swiss German.

Theodore of Octodurum, known as 'Joder' in Switzerland (died c. 400), is a patron saint of Valais, and probably the first bishop of the Diocese of Sion.

== Origin of the surname ==
Jodershubel — German for Yoder Hill — is a natural hill on the Emme River in the Swiss Canton of Bern. German researcher Karl Joder of Ludwigshafen am Rhein believes that the Yoder family was established in the region surrounding the hill before recorded history. The oldest known documentation of the Yoder family is a 1260 record of the birth of a Peter Joder in Joderhuebel.

== Diaspora ==
Yoders were a part of a larger German migration to America between 1700 and 1730. When the Quaker William Penn established the colony of Pennsylvania, he opened it to all religious faiths, allowing complete religious freedom and worship. He sent agents into the Rhine valley and the Rhineland-Palatinate, announcing the opportunities for settlement in his colony, and assuring emigrants they would be allowed freedom of worship. Germans of all faiths came to the new colony by the thousands. They found their way down the Rhine to Rotterdam, the great port of the Dutch Republic, and embarked on slow sailing boats for Philadelphia. Between 1700 and 1775, more than sixty thousand Germans came to America. Some ethnic Germans from the Grand Duchy of Baden, Alsace, and Switzerland also left Europe via French ports such as Le Havre.

After taking the oath of allegiance to the English Crown, the Germans spread out into southeastern Pennsylvania, seeking good land and places to build their new homes. They settled first in what are now Bucks, Montgomery, Chester, Lancaster, and Berks Counties. Today, Yoder is a common surname among the Amish and Mennonites.
