= Salem Abdullah =

Salem Abdullah may refer to:

- Salem Abdullah (footballer, born 1986), Emirati footballer
- Salem Abdullah (footballer, born 1984), Emirati footballer
- Salem Abdullah (footballer, born 1998), Emirati footballer
