= Harry Jacobs (Australian footballer) =

Australian rules footballer

Personal information
- Full name: Henry Joseph Jacobs
- Born: 21 December 1913; Fitzroy North, Victoria
- Died: 15 February 2000 (aged 86)
- Original team: Fitzroy District
- Height: 181 cm (5 ft 11 in)
- Weight: 79 kg (174 lb)

Playing career^{1}
Years	Club	Games (Goals)
1938–1939	Fitzroy	4 (0)
1939	Hawthorn	2 (1)
Total		6 (1)
- ^{1} Playing statistics correct to the end of 1939.

Henry Joseph Jacobs (21 December 1913 – 15 February 2000) was an Australian rules footballer who played with Fitzroy and Hawthorn in the Victorian Football League (VFL).
