= William Obediah Robey =

American minister and teacher (c. 1820–1888)

The Reverend William Obediah Robey
- Born: c. 1820; Fairfax County, Virginia, U.S.
- Died: 1888 (aged 67–68); Leesburg, Virginia, U.S.
- Burial place: Leesburg Presbyterian Cemetery, Leesburg, Virginia, U.S. 39°06′57″N 77°34′04″W
- Occupations: Minister, schoolteacher, blacksmith
- Known for: First African-American teacher in Loudoun County
- Spouse: Rachel Watson Robey (m. 1851; died 1857)
- Children: 3

William Obediah Robey (c. 1820 – 1888) was an American Presbyterian minister and teacher in Leesburg, Virginia. He is the first African-American known to have taught school in Loudoun County, Virginia and was the first African-American member of the Leesburg Presbyterian congregation.

== Biography ==
=== Early life ===
Robey was born in Fairfax County, Virginia and moved shortly after to the adjacent Loudoun County. In 1834, he was arrested and imprisoned after being suspected of being a runaway slave, but he was able to prove that he was free. He then took up an apprenticeship with slaveholder and farmer Edward Hammat until 1841. After finishing his apprenticeship, aged 21, he moved to Washington, D.C. to pursue an education.

=== Religion and family ===
He returned to Loudoun in 1847, settling in Leesburg. He joined the Leesburg Presbyterian Church, becoming the first African-American member of its congregation. He soon married Rachel Ann Watson – a freedwoman. They had three children together, all of whom were baptized at the Presbyterian Church Robey was part of. During this time he worked as a blacksmith, having taken over his deceased father-in-law's smithy.

After a few years as a member of the Presbyterian Church, Robey wished to become a minister. Following a review by Church authorities, he was accepted as a candidate for ministry, – the only African-American in the Presbyterian Church to be approved as a candidate for ordination. However, had he been ordained then, he would have been unable to preach without whites present as per Virginia law at the time.

After the Civil War, Robey resumed his pursuit of becoming a minister. In 1867, he became a licensed Presbyterian preacher, officiating at weddings and preaching in Baptist and Methodist churches throughout the county. In the same year, he became the minister of Leesburg's Mt. Zion Methodist Episcopal Church, – an African-American church. In 1872, he was ordained as an elder in the Methodist Church after struggling to receive full ordination from the Presbytery. He remained as Mt. Zion's minister until 1879.

=== Teaching ===
In 1866, Robey's home became the second Freedmen's Bureau's school in Leesburg, and he became its teacher, making him the first known African-American teacher to teach in Loudoun County. The school was almost entirely funded by the local African-American community. Robey originally had approximately 20 students, which doubled to 40 by December 1868. Although the school closed in 1869, he continued to teach at the new Loudoun County Public School for African-American children until his death in 1888.

== School ==
On 8 June 2021, the Loudoun County School Board voted to name a new high school that would be opening in Loudoun County Public Schools for the 2021–2022 academic year after William Obediah Robey. The name was chosen to continue his legacy as a pastor and educator. William Obediah Robey High School provides an alternative education program to assist Loudoun County Public Schools students whose education has been interrupted by external circumstances and challenges. The school is located at Dominion High School in Sterling, Virginia.
