= Ali al-Abdallah =

Syrian writer and human rights activist

- Occupation: Writer
- Known for: Democracy Activist; Political Prisoner

Ali al-Abdallah (Arabic: علي العبد الله) is a Syrian writer and human rights activist.

He was arrested in Syria in March 2006. He was again arrested and jailed in 2007 after trying to revive the Damascus Declaration. He was released from Adra Prison on June 23, 2010, and re-imprisoned one day later for writing an article that was critical of Syria's ties with Iran. A Syrian military court charged him with weakening national morale. The United States asked Syria to free him.

Amnesty International declared him a prisoner of conscience, "held solely for the peaceful expression of his beliefs", and called for his immediate release.
