= Abdulah Nakaš =

Abdulah Nakaš (November 27, 1944 – November 27, 2005) was chief surgeon at Sarajevo's State Hospital for over 30 years.

He was a graduate of the University of Sarajevo Faculty of Medicine.

Following the outbreak of the War in Bosnia and Hercegovina in May 1992, the state hospital (one of the Yugoslav national army's network of health facilities), cared for military personnel, dignitaries and local residents.

During the Siege of Sarajevo, the hospital rapidly filled with casualties. The building itself was repeatedly shelled. Nakaš faced many difficult medical challenges. He would operate using temporary lighting, with little or no standard equipment, anesthesia or analgesia. Nakaš is said to have worked 1500 consecutive days during the war and its aftermath.

In the post-war period, Nakaš was instrumental in founding the Union of Health Workers. Nakaš also was elected a member of the parliament of the Federation of Bosnia and Herzegovina and then the state for the Party of Democratic Action of Alija Izetbegović. He was considered to be a moderate, but was distressed by the breakup of Bosnia and Herzegovina following the dissolution of Yugoslavia.

Sarajevo awarded him the Sixth of April Sarajevo Award for his service to the city and the nation.

He died in 2005, having suffered from a ruptured abdominal aneurysm which was followed by haemorrhagic pancreatitis and kidney failure. His fame was such that his funeral was one of the largest ever held in the country, drawing thousands of mourners. He was survived by his wife and two children. He was buried in the Kovači Cemetery in Sarajevo, also known as the Martyrs' Memorial, dedicated to soldiers and civilian victims of the war. A hospital in Sarajevo was named for him.
