= Abdia =

Abdia عبديا
- Village
- Location within Iran
- Coordinates: 36°03′53″N 54°23′15″E
- Country: Iran
- Province: Semnan
- County: Damghan
- Bakhsh: Central
- Rural District: Howmeh

Population (2006)
  - Total: 60
- Time zone: UTC+3:30 (IRST)
  - Summer (DST): UTC+4:30 (IRDT)

Abdia or Abdia (Persian: عبديا, also Romanized as ‘Abdīā) is a village in Howmeh Rural District, in the Central District of Damghan County, Semnan Province, Iran. At the 2006 census, its population was 60, in 20 families.

The old name of this village was watery. Watery is the name of the son of the Achaemenid kings who reigned for many years before the Damghan. After many years, the name of this village was changed to Dya (Odia), and then changed again to Abdia, which is still used today. Abdia village rests 175 meters above sea level.

The village has a subterranean water supply. The economy is based on agriculture and cattle. Due to desert exposure, the climate of the area is warm and dry. The last census showed the village population to be 100 with more than half of them being in the younger demographics.
