= Ariel (angel) =

Angel in Jewish and Christian mysticism

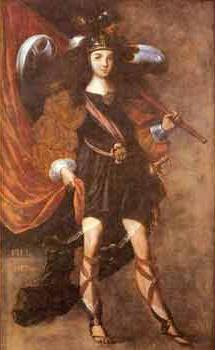
Ariel, painting from the Sopo Archangels collection.

Ariel (Hebrew: אֲרִיאֵל, romanized: ʾÁrīʾēl; Ancient Greek: Ἀριήλ, romanized: Ariel) is an angel found primarily in Judaism and Christianity. Ariel is associated with nature.

== Bible and Mesha Stele ==
The word Ariel appears in the Hebrew Bible and on the Mesha Stele under various spellings, but not as the name of an angel. The meaning of Ariel is not consistent in its multiple appearances, and the interpretations of its meaning in these verses has been the source of controversy.

Its inconsistent spellings and meanings, and lack of Hebrew parallels, points to the word likely being a foreign loan-word. Samuel Feigin, for instance, states "all the places where it appears seem to be archaic or archaistic in character. The different spellings ... indicate that the word is a loan from a foreign language." He argues that the original meaning of the word was related to death and suggests that it is related to Arali (Sumerian) and Arallu (Babylonian), names for the ancient Mesopotamian underworld as well as for the mountain/residence of the gods.

In 2 Samuel 23:20 and its parallel passage 1 Chronicles 11:22 the meaning of the word could be hero of the past, a spirit of the lower world, an altar-pillar, a lion-like man, or it could be a personal name.

In Ezra 8:16 it could be a personal name, though this interpretation is contested.

In Ezekiel 43:15 it appears in the context of the altar of burnt-offerings in the millennial kingdom, and likely refers to the highest part of the altar, where sacrifices would be brought.

In Isaiah 29:1–2, 7 it likely means Jerusalem and in Isaiah 33:7, some scholars argue it again could mean Jerusalem. The Talmud conversely interprets its use in Isaiah 33:7 as the name of the class of angels of death, the Erelim.

On the Mesha Stele, it has been translated as a matzevah (sacred pillar) representing a deity, spirit-lion, and hearth-altar.

== Pistis Sophia ==
In the Coptic Pistis Sophia (British Library, Add MS 5114), Jesus bids the apostles preach that they "be delivered from the rivers of smoke of Ariel." Because of the association of Jerusalem with the name "Ariel", it is likely that this is an allusion to the fires of Gehenna (or Gehinnom), a valley near Jerusalem deemed cursed because of its association with early pagan religions (Ba'als and Canaanite gods, including Moloch) where children were sacrificed by immolation. In later Jewish, Christian and Islamic scripture, Gehenna is a destination of the wicked and often translated in English biblical versions as "Hell". According to tradition, fires located in this valley were kept burning perpetually to consume the filth and cadavers thrown into it.

== Book of Enoch and John Milton ==
Harris Fletcher (1930) found the name Ariel in a copy of the Syncellus fragments of the Book of Enoch. Fletcher suggested that the text was known to John Milton and may be the source for Milton's use of the name for a minor angel in Paradise Lost. However, the presence of the name in the Syncellus fragments has not been verified (1938), and, reviewing for example the Dead Sea Scrolls, earlier versions of the Book of Enoch are now known to not contain the name Ariel. In Paradise Lost, Ariel is a rebel angel, overcome by the seraph Abdiel in the first day of the War of Heaven.

== Occult and mysticism ==
According to the German occultist Cornelius Agrippa (1486–1535): "Ariel is the name of an angel, sometimes also of a demon, and of a city, whence called Ariopolis, where the idol is worshipped."

"Ariel" has been called an ancient name for the leontomorphic Gnostic Demiurge (Creator God). Historically, the entity Ariel was often pictured in mysticism as a lion-headed deity with power over the Earth, giving a strong foundation for Ariel's association with the Demiurge. It is possible that the name itself was even adopted from the Demiurge's Zoroastrian counterpart Ahriman (who is likely the predecessor of the Mithraic "Arimanius").

"Ariel" is sometimes associated with the better known Judeo-Christian Archangel Uriel, as for example some sources claim that the Elizabethan court astrologer John Dee called "Ariel" a "conglomerate of Anael and Uriel," though this is not mentioned where the name Anael appears in the only conversation of Dee with Barnabas Saul.

In Thomas Heywood, Hierarchy of the Blessed Angels (1635) Ariel is called both a prince who rules the waters and "Earth's great Lord." In several occult writings, Ariel is mentioned with other elemental titles such as the "3rd archon of the winds," "spirit of air," "angel of the waters of the Earth" and "wielder of fire." In mysticism, especially modern, Ariel is usually depicted as a governing angel with dominion over the Earth, creative forces, the North, elemental spirits, and beasts. Other entries in angelologies to Ariel are found in Jacques Collin de Plancy, Dictionnaire Infernal (1863) and Moïse Schwab Vocabulaire de l'Angélologie (1897).

== See also ==
- List of angels in theology
- Uriel

== General and cited references ==
- Constance Briggs (1997). The Encyclopedia of Angels: An A-to-Z Guide with Nearly 4,000 Entries. Plume. ISBN 0-452-27921-6.
- Elizabeth Marian Butler (1949). Ritual Magic. ISBN 0-7509-1859-4.
- Gustav Davidson (1967). A Dictionary of Angels: Including the Fallen Angels. The Free Press. ISBN 9780029070505.
- David Godwin (1994). Godwin's Cabalistic Encyclopedia. Llewellyn Publications. ISBN 1-56718-324-7.
- Samuel Liddell MacGregor Mathers (1888). The Key of Solomon the King (Clavicula Salomonis). (The 1889 edition.)
