= Bowdela =

Bowdela بودلا
- Village
- Location within Iran
- Coordinates: 35°32′23″N 47°34′18″E
- Country: Iran
- Province: Kurdistan
- County: Bijar
- Bakhsh: Chang Almas
- Rural District: Khosrowabad

Population (2006)
  - Total: 184
- Time zone: UTC+3:30 (IRST)
  - Summer (DST): UTC+4:30 (IRDT)

Bowdela (Persian: بودلا, also romanized as Bowdelā and Būdlā; also known as 'Abdollāh, Moshīrābād, and Ubaidullah) is a village in Khosrowabad Rural District, Chang Almas District, Bijar County, Kurdistan province, Iran. At the 2006 census, its population was 184, divided over 42 families. The village is populated by Kurds.
