= Khalid Abdullah =

Khalid Abdullah may refer to:

- Khalid bin Abdullah Al Saud (1937–2021), Saudi prince
- Khalid bin Abdullah Al Saud (1941–1985), Saudi prince
- Khalid bin Abdullah Al Saud (born 1950), Saudi prince
- Khalid Abdullah (linebacker) (born 1979), former American and Canadian football player
- Khalid Abdullah (running back) (born 1995), American football player
- Khalid Abdullah (Egyptian), first husband of Zaynab Khadr and suspect in the 1995 attack on the Egyptian Embassy in Pakistan

== See also ==
- Khalid Abdalla (born 1980), British actor
- Syed Abdullah Khalid (1942–2017), sculptor from Bangladesh
- Khalid Abdullah Almolhem (born 1957), Saudi Arabian businessman
- Khalid Abdullah Mishal al Mutairi (born 1975), Kuwaiti charity worker who was unlawfully detained
