= Mohamed Abdullah =

Mohamed Abdullah may refer to:

- Mohamed Abdullah (footballer) (born 1981), Egyptian footballer
- Mohamed Abdullah (swimmer) (born 1973), Emirati swimmer
- Mohamed Abdullah (Emirati athlete) (born 1964), Emirati Olympic sprinter
- Mohamed Dzaiddin Abdullah (born 1938), Malaysian judge
- Mohamed Sayed Abdulla (born 1974), Egyptian field hockey player
- Mohamed Abdullah (Iraqi athlete) (born 1935), Iraqi pole vaulter
- Mohamed Abdallah, Sudanese football coach
- Abdallah Ali Mohamed, Comorian footballer
- Mo Abbaro (Mohammed Ahmed Abdalla Abbaro), Sudanese artist
- Mohamed Abdalla (footballer, born 2009), Dutch footballer

== See also ==
- Mohammed Ahmed Abdallah, Sudanese physician
- Mohammed Abdullah (disambiguation)
