= Abdullah Demirbaş =

Turkish politician (born 1966)

Abdullah Demirbaş (born 1966, Sise, Diyarbakır, Turkey) was s former mayor of the municipality of Sur in the city of Diyarbakır, of the Peace and Democracy Party (BDP).

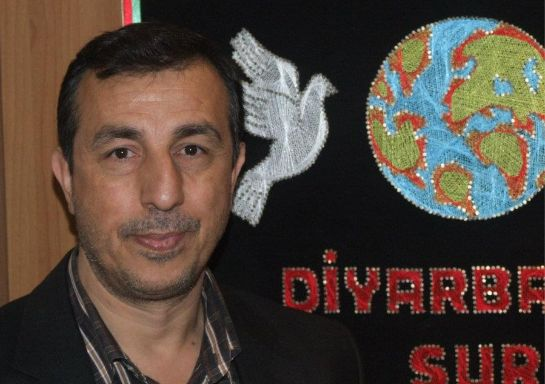
Abdullah Demîrbaş

== Early life and education ==
After graduating in sociology at Firat University in Elazig, Abdullah Demirbas worked as a philosophy teacher from 1987 to 2007, contributing to setting up the Mardin Branch of the Turkish Union of Teachers.

== Political career ==
When he was elected as Mayor of Sur in 2004, he made a commitment to his electorate to serve them in their own languages. On the 6 October 2006 the Sur municipal council decided that since the population of the town has people who speak Turkish, Kurdish, Arabic, Syriac and Armenian, the municipality will be conducted on a multilingual basis. In 2007 he was removed from his functions, together with the entire municipal council, for using the Kurdish language in official business. He was accused of the misuse of municipal resources, having printed a children's book and tourist brochures in Kurdish. Demirbaş accused the prosecution of discrimination arguing that Municipalities which also offer their services in languages other than Turkish have not been targeted with an investigation.

The Congress of the Council of Europe took up his case in its 2007 report and Recommendation 229 on Local Democracy in Turkey.

In the local elections of March 2009, he was re-elected with a stronger majority. However, the prosecutions against him continued and in May 2009 he was sentenced to 2 years in jail for language crimes.

He is a campaigner for minority languages and has called on Turkey to ratify the European Charter for Regional or Minority Languages.

His project - "A Story for each night and every house is a School" - aimed to publish 365 stories for children in Kurdish and other minority languages. A court case against him concerning this project was dropped in September 2009.

On 24 December 2009 he was detained as part of a widespread crackdown against members of the former DTP party. On 30 December he issued an open letter from prison pleading for medical treatment and drawing attention to the political nature of his arrest. He was released on 15 May 2010 on medical grounds.

In 2011 the Turkish press reported that his life was at risk because a travel ban imposed by the authorities prevented him from getting the medical care that he needed.

On 9 August 2015 he was arrested and several charges were brought against him.
