= Abdiel =

Abdiel (Hebrew: עֲבְדִּיאֵל "Servant of El") is a biblical name which has been used as the name for a number of notable people. The name has the same meaning as Obadiah and is cognate with the Arabic name Abdullah. Abdiel is mentioned a single time in the Bible, in 1 Chronicles 5:15: "Ahi the son of Abdiel, the son of Guni, chief of the house of their fathers."

== People ==
Notable people with the name include:

- Abdiel Arroyo (born 1993), Panamanian footballer
- Abdiel Ayarza (born 1992), Panamanian footballer
- Abdiel Colberg (born 1957), Puerto Rican film director and television producer
- Abdiel Crossman (1804–1859), mayor of New Orleans, Louisiana
- Abdiel Vázquez (born 1984), Mexican pianist
- Abdiel Villa (born 1983), Mexican footballer
- Aperel (fl. c. 1350s BCE), ancient Egyptian courtier and administrator

== Other uses ==
=== Paradise Lost ===
Chief among characters bearing the name Abdiel is the seraph Abdiel appearing in Milton's Paradise Lost (1667), specifically in Book V and Book VI. Two passages from Book V serve to establish Abdiel's character:

Had audience; when among the Seraphim
Abdiel, than whom none with more zeal adored
The Deity, and divine commands obeyed

— Book V, lines 804-806

So spake the Seraph Abdiel, faithful found
Among the faithless, faithful only he
Among innumerable false. Unmoved,
Unshaken, unreduced, unterrified
His loyalty he kept, his love, his zeal.

— Book V, lines 896-900

Abdiel denounces Satan after hearing him incite revolt among the angels, and abandons Lucifer to bring the news of his defection to God. However, when he arrives, he finds that preparations are already underway for battle. In the ensuing fight, Abdiel smites Satan, Ariel, Ramiel, and Arioch, presumably among others. In Asimov's Annotated Paradise Lost, Isaac Asimov theorized that Abdiel was in fact a representation of Milton himself. Likewise, in Cyder, Ambrose Philips refers to Milton as "that other bard" and contrasts Milton to his character Abdiel.

=== Other uses ===
The character name Abdiel has also been used:

- by Madeleine L'Engle in Many Waters as one among the seraphim
- by Margaret Weis in the Star of the Guardians trilogy as a villain
- by Anatole France in The Revolt of the Angels as the "angelic name" of the character Arcade, the guardian angel bent on causing the revolt that gives the novel its title
- by Steven Brust in To Reign in Hell as the ambitious angel who catalyzes the dispute between Yaweh and Satan which would eventually result in the revolt in Heaven
- by Kage Baker in The Graveyard Game as an immortal who maintains certain secret machinery
- As a major character in Shin Megami Tensei V, as an archangel who is the main representative of the game's law route
- As a minor character in Drakengard 3, as a golem who is a protector of the game's main antagonist
