= Abdullah Yılmaz (football referee) =

Turkish football referee (born 1978)

Personal information
- Nationality: Turkish
- Born: 6 May 1978 (age 48) Trabzon Turkey

Sport
- Country: Turkey
- Sport: football referee
- Club: TFF 3. Lig; TFF 2. Lig; TFF 1. Lig; Süper Lig

Abdullah Yılmaz (born 6 May 1978) is a Turkish football referee.

== Career ==
Yılmaz was born in 1978 in the Turkish city of Trabzon. He became a referee at the age of 19, inspired by his father Azmi, who was also a senior referee.

His debut as a referee in the Süper Lig gave Yılmaz on May 13, 2006 at the age of 28 years; he led the encounter Vestel Manisaspor against Konyaspor.
