= Ovadia =

Ovadia or Ovadya is a given name and surname. Notable people with the name include:

- Dvira Ovadia (born 1979), Israeli television personality and interior designer
- Moni Ovadia (born 1946), Italian actor, musician, singer, and theatrical author
- Estreya Haim Ovadya (1922–1944), Jewish Yugoslav partisan
- Robert Ovadia, Australian reporter
- Ovadia Eli (born 1945), Israeli politician
- Ovadia Hedaya (1889–1969), Israeli rabbi
- Ovadia Yosef (1918 or 1920 – 2013), Iraqi-born Sephardi Chief Rabbi of Israel

== See also ==
- Obadiah (given name)
- Obadiah (disambiguation)
