= O. C. French =

American politician

Obediah Crew French was a state legislator in Mississippi. He was a Republican. He and other Republican legislators were ridiculed in the Natchez Democrat. Z. P. Landrum, a fellow legislator, called him a low-bred carpet bag cur. He served as Mississippi's commissioner for the U.S. Centennial.

He was from Ohio and served in the Union Army during the American Civil War. He represented Adams County, Mississippi in the Mississippi House of Representatives from 1870 to 1875, serving with John R. Lynch.

He lost a state senate election to T. P. Gore in Oklahoma.

He married Mary Carey Fowler May 1, 1856 in Ravenna, Ohio.
