= Obadiah =

Biblical prophet

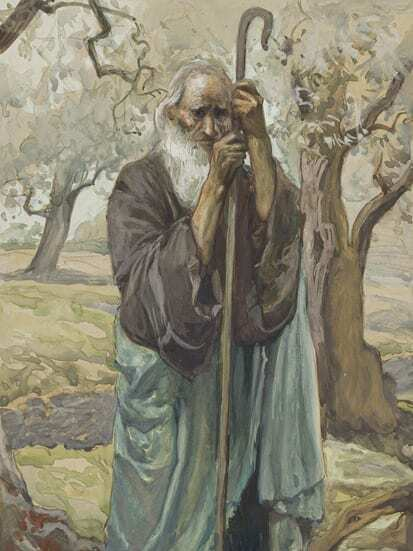
- The Prophet Obadiah by James Tissot, c. 1900

Prophet
- Born: Unknown
- Died: Unknown
- Venerated in: Judaism; Christianity; Islam; Rastafari
- Feast: 19 November (Catholic, Lutheran, and Eastern Orthodox churches); 15 Tobi (Coptic)
- Attributes: Prophet with his index finger of his right hand pointing upward
- Major works: Book of Obadiah

Obadiah (/oʊbəˈdaɪ.ə/; Hebrew: עֹבַדְיָה – ʿŌḇaḏyā or עֹבַדְיָהוּ – ʿŌḇaḏyāhū; "servant/slave of Yah"), also known as Abdias, is a biblical prophet. The authorship of the Book of Obadiah is traditionally attributed to the prophet Obadiah.

Most scholars date the Book of Obadiah to shortly after the fall of Jerusalem in 587 BC. Other scholars hold that the book was shaped by the conflicts between Yehud and the Edomites in the fifth and fourth centuries BCE and evolved through a process of redaction.

== Biblical account ==
=== Dating ===
The composition date is disputed and difficult to determine due to the lack of information regarding the prophet Obadiah. However, because Obadiah wrote about Edom, there are two generally accepted dates. The first is 853–841 BC, when Jerusalem was invaded by Philistines and Arabs during the reign of Jehoram of Judah (recorded in 2 Kings 8:20–22 and 2 Chronicles 21:8-17). This earlier period would place Obadiah as a contemporary of the prophet Elijah. Jewish traditions favor the earlier date because the Talmud identifies Obadiah as an Edomite himself, and a descendant of Eliphaz the Temanite, the first of the friends of Job to speak with him about his tribulations.

The other is 607–586 BCE, when Jerusalem was attacked by Nebuchadnezzar II of the Neo-Babylonian Empire, which led to the Babylonian captivity (recorded in Psalm 137). The later date would place Obadiah as a contemporary of the prophet Jeremiah. The Interpreters' Bible states that:

The political situation implied in the prophecy points to a time after the Exile, probably in the mid-fifth century B.C. No value can be attributed to traditions identifying this prophet with King Ahab's steward (... so Babylonian Talmud, Sanhedrin 39b) or with King Ahaziah's captain (... so Pseudo-Epiphanius...).

— The Interpreters' Bible.

== Rabbinic tradition ==
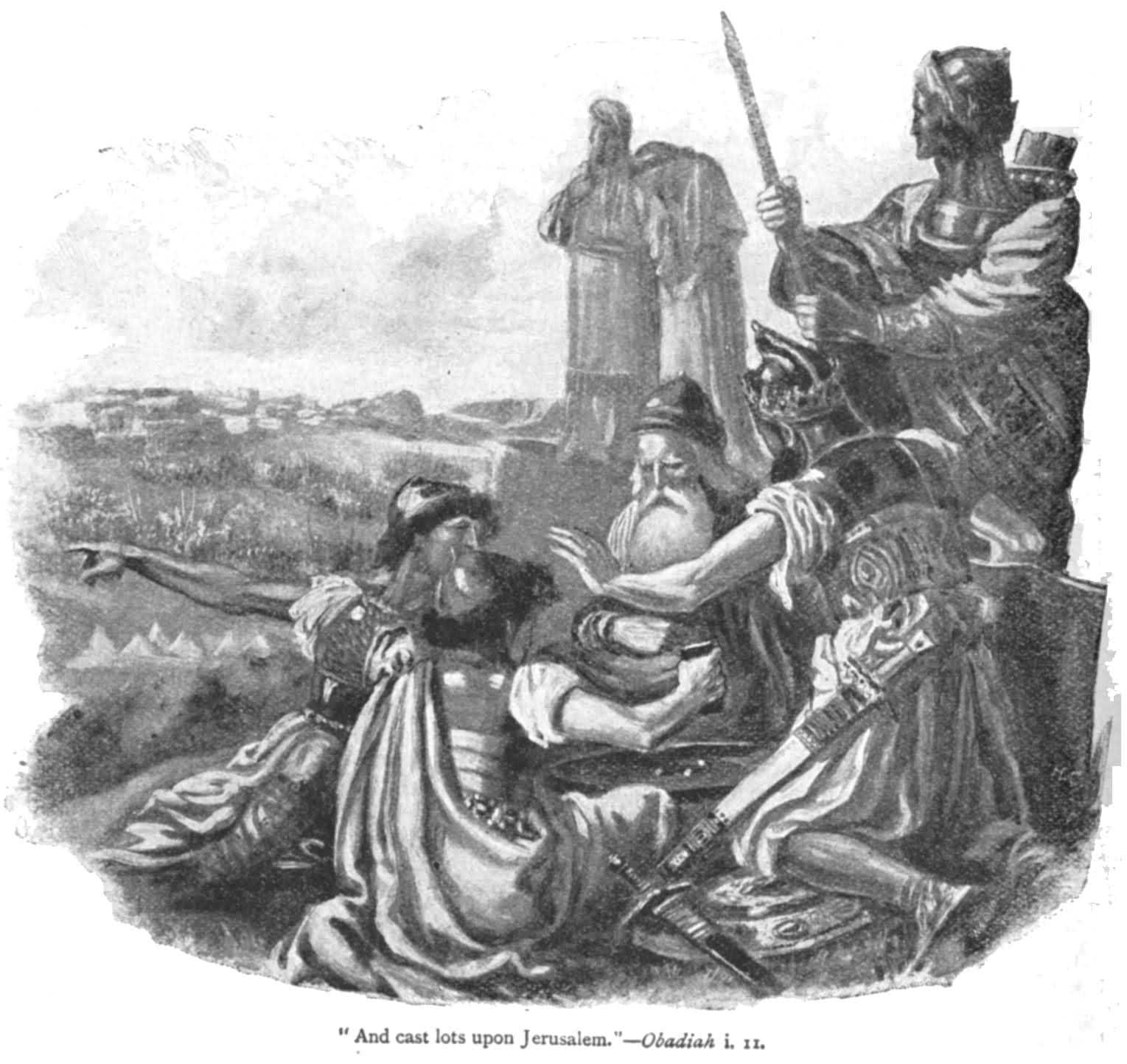
Vision of Obadiah

According to the Talmud, Obadiah is said to have been a convert to Judaism from Edom, a descendant of Eliphaz, the friend of Job. He is identified with the Obadiah who was the servant of Ahab, and was chosen to prophesy against Edom because he was himself an Edomite.

Obadiah is supposed to have received the gift of prophecy for having hidden the "hundred prophets" from the persecution of Jezebel. He hid the prophets in two caves, so that if those in one cave should be discovered those in the other might yet escape.

Obadiah was very rich, but all his wealth was expended in feeding the poor prophets, until, in order to be able to continue to support them, finally he had to borrow money at interest from Ahab's son Jehoram. Obadiah's fear of God was one degree higher than that of Abraham; and if the house of Ahab had been capable of being blessed, it would have been blessed for Obadiah's sake.

== Christian tradition ==
In some Christian traditions he is said to have been born in "Sychem" (Shechem), and to have been the third captain sent out by Ahaziah against Elijah. The date of his ministry is unclear due to certain historical ambiguities in the book bearing his name, but is believed to be around 586 B.C.

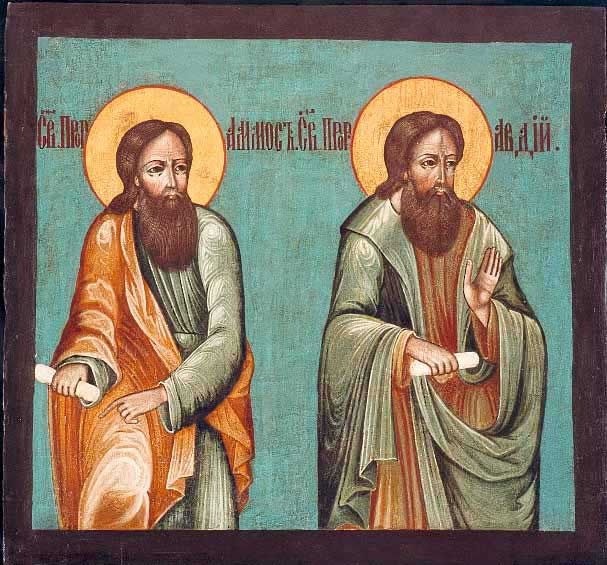
Russian icon of Prophets Amos and Obadiah, 18th century.

He is regarded as a saint by several Eastern churches. His feast day is celebrated on the 15th day of the Coptic Month Tobi (23/24 January) in the Coptic Orthodox Church. The Eastern Orthodox Church and those Eastern Catholic Churches which follow the Byzantine Rite celebrate his memory on 19 November. (For those churches which follow the traditional Julian Calendar, 19 November currently falls on 2 December of the modern Gregorian Calendar.)

He is celebrated on 28 February in the Syriac and Malankara Churches, and with the other Minor prophets in the Calendar of saints of the Armenian Apostolic Church on 31 July.

According to an old tradition, Obadiah is buried in Sebastia, at the same site as Elisha and where later the body of John the Baptist was believed to have been buried by his followers.

== Islamic tradition ==
In Islam, Adbiyya ibn Shāmiyya (Arabic: عَوبِديا بن شامِيَة) is considered to be an Israʼiliyyat prophet sent to guide the Bani-Israel possibly in the era of the Prophet Ilyās (Elijah) or shortly after. Some Islamic scholars identify the prophet Dhu al-Kifl with Obadiah.

== See also ==
- Abda (biblical figure)
- Abdiel
- Theodulus, a Greek name with the same meaning
