= Abdullah Khan =

Abdullah Khan may refer to:

== Sport ==
- Abdullah Khan (athlete) (1933–2017), Pakistani Olympic sprinter
- Abdullah Khan (cricketer) (born 1965), Pakistani cricketer

== Government, military, and politics ==
- Abdullah Khan II (1533–1598), sixteenth century Uzbek ruler
- Abdullah Khan (Moghul Khan) (died 1675), one of the last Chagatai Khans at Khotan
- Hassan Ali Khan Barha (1666–1722), also known as Abdullah Khan II, one-half of the Sayyid brothers who were key figures in the Mughal Empire under emperor Farrukhsiyar
- Abdullah Khan of Rohilkhand, Indian nawab of Rohilkhand during the Mughal era
- Abdullah Khan Barha, Indian nawab of Ajmer during the Mughal era
- Abdullah Azam Khan (born 1993), Indian politician

== Other ==
- Abdallah Khan (c. 1770 – c. 1850), Iranian court painter
- Abdullah Khan (author), Indian author and screenwriter
- Abdullah Mohammad Khan, Afghan former Guantanamo detainee
- Abdullah Khan (Guantanamo detainee 950), Afghan detainee at Guantanamo Bay
