= Abdullah =

Abdullah may refer to:

- Abdullah (name), a list of people with the given name or surname
- Abdullah, Kargı, Turkey, a village
- Abdullah (film), a 1980 Bollywood film directed by Sanjay Khan
- Abdullah: The Final Witness, a 2015 Pakistani drama film
- Abdullah (band), an American metal band
- Abdullah (horse) (1970–2000), a horse that competed in the sport of show jumping
- MV Abdullah, 2015 built bulk carrier
- "Abdullah" (I Dream of Jeannie), a 1968 television episode

== See also ==
- Abdalla people, an ethnic group in Kenya
- Abdollah (disambiguation)
- Abdulla (disambiguation)
- Abdiel (disambiguation)
