= Abdo =

In Medicine, abdo is short for abdominal.

As a name, notable people called Abdo, Abdou, Abdouh or Abdu include:

== People ==
Abdo, Abdu, Abdou, Abdoun, Abdoh, Abbud, Aboud, Aboodi etc is a masculine Arabic name, and a nickname for Abdul. The name is also of Syriac origin and is a variant of 'Abdā, meaning 'servant' or 'slave'.

=== Given name ===
==== In arts and media ====
- Abdou Cherif, Moroccan singer
- Abdo Hakim (born 1973), Lebanese actor and voice actor
- Abdu al-Hamuli (1836–1901), Egyptian musician
- Abdo Khal (born 1962), Saudi Arabian author

==== In military and politics ====
- Abdou Diouf (born 1935), second president of Senegal
- Aboud El Zomor (born 1952), Egyptian politician and former military officer
- Abdou Soulé Elbak (born 1954), president of the autonomous island of Grande Comore
- Abdo Hussameddin (born 1954), Syrian politician and minister
- Abdo al-Tallawi, Syrian general killed in the Siege of Homs in 2011

==== In sport ====
- Abdo Al-Edresi (born 1986), Yemeni football player
- Abdou Alassane Dji Bo (born 1979), Nigerien judoka
- Abdou Doumbia (born 1990), French footballer
- Abdou El-Kholti (born 1980), French footballer
- Abdoh Otaif (born 1984), Saudi Arabian football player
- Abdou Sall (born 1980), Senegalese footballer
- Abdu Shaher, English martial artist
- Abdou Traoré (footballer born 1981), Malian football player

=== Middle name ===
- Ali Abdu Ahmed, Eritrean politician
- Adnan Abdo Al Sukhni (born 1961), Syrian politician and minister

=== Surname ===
==== In arts and media ====
- Fifi Abdou (born 1953), Egyptian belly dancer and actress
- Geneive Abdo (born 1960), American journalist, scholar and author
- Jay Abdo (born 1962), Syrian American actor
- Karimeh Abbud (1896–1940) , Palestinian female photographer
- Kate Abdo (born 1981), English TV sports presenter and journalist
- Mohammed Abdo (born 1949), Saudi singer
- Hassan Aboud (1980–2014) , Syrian journalist and leader of Ahrar al-Sham
- Reza Abdoh, American theatre director
- Salar Abdoh, Iranian novelist and essayist

==== In military and politics ====
- Ahmed Abdou (born 1936), Comorian politician
- Ali Abdo (politician), Ethiopian politician
- Hassan Aboud (1980–2014) , Syrian journalist and leader of Ahrar al-Sham
- Mario Abdo Benítez, Paraguayan politician, 51st president of Paraguay
- Naser Jason Abdo (born 1990), American former US Army Private First Class of Jordanian origin. American conscientious objector and sentenced in 2012 with terrorism-related charges

==== In sport ====
- Djamel Abdoun (born 1986), Algerian professional footballer
- Ali Abdo (football chairman), Iranian Australian boxer and founder of Persepolis Athletic and Cultural Club and Chairman of Persepolis F.C.
- Haidar Aboodi (born 1986), former Iraqi footballer
- Ali Abdo (wrestler) (born 1981), Australian freestyle wrestler
- Hamse Abdouh (born 1991), Palestinian swimmer
- Jimmy Abdou (born 1984), Comorian footballer
- Kate Abdo (born 1981), English TV sports presenter and journalist
- Reema Abdo (born 1963), Canadian backstroke swimmer and Olympian

==== In other fields ====
- Andrew Abdo, CEO of the NRL in Australia
- John Abdo, American health and fitness expert, businessman, nutritionist and motivational speaker
- Hussam Abdo, suicide bomber
- Tom Abdo (1894–1967), American poker player

== Other uses ==
- Association of British Dispensing Opticians

== See also ==
- Abu Abdo or Abu Abdo al-Fawwal, famous ful parlor in Aleppo, Syria
