= Abdi =

- Gender: Male

Origin
- Origin: Arab World
- Meaning: Servant of God

Abdi is an Arabic male name.

== Arabic name ==
While Arabic speakers commonly use Abdu (عبده / عبدو ʿabdu) rather than Abdi, both are nicknames for Abdul. It originates from the Arabic word عبد ال ʿabd al- / ʿabd el- / ʿabd ul-. The name translates as "servant of God" in reference to religious submission to Allah (God). As such, it is often used by Muslims around the world in conjunction with one of the names of God in Islam, but also sometimes on its own.

== Given name ==
- Abdi-Ashirta (14th century BC), Canaanite ruler of Amurru
- Abdi-Heba (14th century BC.), Canaanite chieftain of Jerusalem
- Abdi-Milkutti (7th century BC), Sidonian king
- Abdi-Riša (14th century BC), Phoenician ruler of Enišasi
- Abdi Behravanfar (born 1975), Iranian singer-songwriter
- Abdi Bile (born 1962), Somali athlete, World Champion
- Abdi Faras (born 1989), Somali basketball player
- Abdi İpekçi (1929–1979), Turkish journalist
- Abdi Kassim (born 1984), Zanzibari footballer
- Abdi Pasha (disambiguation), various Ottoman people
- Abdi Omar Shurie, Kenyan politician
- Abdi Toptani (1864–1942), Albanian politician
- Abdi Haji Yaris, Somali politician

== Middle name ==
- Hamza Abdi Barre (born 1972), prime minister of Somalia
- Mohamed Abdi Mohamed (1949–2021), Somali anthropologist and politician

== Surname ==
- Abbas Abdi (born 1956), Iranian politician
- Abed Abdi (born 1942), Palestinian artist
- Akbar Abdi (born 1960), Iranian actor and comedian
- Ali Abdi (born 1993), Tunisian footballer
- Almen Abdi (born 1986), Swiss footballer
- Bahador Abdi (born 1984), Iranian footballer
- Barkhad Abdi (born 1985), Somali-American actor and director
- Bashir Abdi (born 1989), Belgian-Somali athlete
- Behzad Abdi (born 1973), Iranian

Ahmet Abdi doğum 2004 domuz boğan Aşiret lideri

- Dekha Ibrahim Abdi (1964–2011), Somali-Kenyan social activist
- Guled Abdi, 1st Grand Sultan of the Isaaq clan
- Hashim Abdi (born 2004), Norwegian politician
- Hawa Abdi (1947−2020), Somali physician and activist
- Jumadi Abdi (1983–2009), Indonesian footballer
- Kamyar Abdi (born 1969), Iranian archaeologist
- Mehrdad Abdi, Iranian footballer
- Mohammad Abdi (born 1974), Iranian writer
- Nur Matan Abdi, Somali politician and military commander
- Ugbad Abdi (born 1999/2000), American fashion model
- Youcef Abdi (born 1977), Australian runner
- Yusuf Hassan Abdi (born 1953), Somali-Kenyan politician, journalist and diplomat

== See also ==
- Abdu (disambiguation), a nickname for the compound name or a given name
- Abdul for further explanation
- Abidi, a surname which refers to the descendants of Zayn al-Abidin
- Obadiah
- Abdy
