= Abdul =

- Pronunciation: /ˈæbdʊl/; Arabic: [ʕæbdel, ʕabdɪl, ʕæbdʊl]
- Gender: Male
- Language: Arabic

Origin
- Meaning: Servant of the...

Other names
- Related names: Abdi, Abdiel, Abdu, Abdullah, Obadiah, Obaidullah, Ovadia

Abdul (also transliterated as Abdal, Abdel, Abdil, Abdol, Abdool, or Abdoul; Arabic: عبد ال, ʿAbd al-) is the most frequent transliteration of the combination of the Arabic word Abd (عبد, meaning "servant" or "slave") and the definite prefix al / el (ال, meaning "the").

It is the initial component of many compound names, such as عبد الحميد ʿAbd al-Ḥamīd (usually spelled Abdel Hamid, Abdelhamid, Abd El Hamid or Abdul Hamid; lit. "servant of the Praised"), عبد الله ʿAbd Allāh (Abdullah), and عبد الملك ʿAbd al-Malik (Abdul Malik).

The most common use for Abdul by far, is as part of a male given name, written in English. When written in English, Abdul is subject to variable spacing, spelling, and hyphenation. It is a common name in the Middle East, North Africa, West Africa, East Africa, Central Asia, the Balkans, the Caucasus, and predominantly Muslim countries of South Asia and Southeast Asia. It is also used amongst African Americans and Turkic peoples of Russia.

The meaning of Abdul literally and normally means "Slave of the", but English translations also often translate it to "Servant of the".

== Spelling variations ==
Variations in spelling are primarily because of the variation in pronunciation. Arabic speakers normally pronounce and transcribe their names of Arabic origin according to their spoken Arabic dialects. Therefore, it is pronounced /ʕabdel/ and written Abdel... or Abd El.... However, non-Arabic speakers or Arabic speakers may choose to transcribe the name according to the Literary Arabic pronunciation, which is the language of Quran, pronounced as /ʕabdul/ and written Abdul.... For other variations in spelling, see the Arabic grammar section.

== Etymology ==
In Arabic, the word عبد ʿabd means "slave" or "servant", from the triliteral root ع-ب-د ʕ-B-D. It is related to the word عبادة ʿibādah, which means "worshiping". The word has a positive connotation in the Islamic faith.

=== Theophoric naming ===
Essentially there is no Abdul without the second part, when written in Arabic, thus it appears as a component of many Arabic and specifically Muslim names, where it is the opening of a religiously based name, meaning: "Servant of the..." with the last component of the name being one of the names of God in Islam, which would form a Muslim Arabic theophoric name. Such as Abdullah simply meaning "Servant of God" while "Abdul Aziz" means "Servant of the Almighty" and so on. The names Abdul Masih, ("Servant of the Messiah/Christ") and Abdus Salib ("Servant of the Cross") are Arabic Christian equivalents.

In addition, Abdul is occasionally, though much more rarely, used in reference to a figure other than God. For example, the Indian name Abdul Mughal ("Servant of the Mughal Empire").

=== Derived theophoric names ===
The most common names are listed below:

- Abdul Latif, Servant of the Gentle
- Abdulaziz, Servant of the Almighty
- Abdulkarim, Servant of the most Generous
- Abdullah, Servant of Allah
- Abdulqadir, Servant of the Powerful
- Abdurrahim, Servant of the Merciful
- Abdurrahman, Servant of the Benevolent
- Abdussalam, Servant of the Peaceful

=== Arabic grammar ===
When followed by a sun letter, the l in al (normally pronounced colloquially el) assimilates to the initial consonant of the following noun, resulting in a doubled consonant. For example, "Abdul Rahman", would be pronounced in Literary Arabic: Abdur-Rahman [ʕæbdʊr ræħˈmæːn]. When the definite article is followed by a moon letter, no assimilation takes place.

Therefore, Abdul is not always used as the opening part of the name; if the second part starts with a sun letter, it may become forms including Abdun, Abdur, Abdus, or Abdush, the vowel in each name, similarly with Abdul, is also open to differing transliterations.

=== Independent naming ===
Abdul does not appear on its own as a male given name when written in Arabic. In some cultures, the theophoric part may appear to be a stand-alone middle name, or surname, thus confusing people as to whether Abdul is an accepted given name. Often if someone shortens his/her name, he may equally choose the theophoric part or Abdul. However, Abdul by itself is sometimes used as an independent full given first name outside of Arabic-speaking societies. Most commonly Abdul is followed by one of the names of God found in the Quran, the Islamic scriptures, for example "Abdul Rahman", which means "slave/servant of the Merciful".

== Given name ==
- A. P. J. Abdul Kalam (1931–2015), 11th President of India
- Abdul "Duke" Fakir (1935–2024), American singer, best known as a member of the Four Tops
- Abdul Abdulmalik (born 2003), English footballer
- Abdul Azim Badakhshi (born 1995), Afghan-born businessman, social media personality, and MMA athlete
- Abdul Aziz, several people
- Abdul Carter (born 2004), American football player
- Abdul Diallo (born 1985), Burkina Faso footballer
- Abdul El-Sayed (born 1984), American politician and epidemiologist
- Abdul Fatawu (born 2004), Ghanaian professional footballer
- Abdul Gaddy (born 1992), American basketball player
- Abdul Ghaffar Khan (1890–1988), Pakistani Pashtun independence activist
- Abdul Hakim Haqqani (born 1967), Afghan Taliban jurist
- Abdul Halim of Kedah (1927–2017), 28th Sultan of Kedah
- Abdul Hamid Dbeibeh (born 1958), Libyan politician and businessman
- Abdul Hamid II (1842–1918), 34th sultan of the Ottoman Empire
- Abdul Hodge (born 1983), American football linebacker
- Abdul Kabir, Afghan Taliban leader
- Abdul Kadir (1952–2018), Guyanese politician, convicted terrorist.
- Abdul Momin (1788–1885), 24th Sultan of Brunei
- Abdul Qadir (1955–2019), Pakistani cricketeer
- Abdul Qadir Gilani (1077/1078–1166), Hanbali scholar, preacher, and Sufi leader
- Abdul Rahman bin Faisal Al Saud (1850–1928), last emir of Nejd
- Abdul Rahman of Negeri Sembilan (1895–1960), Yang di-Pertuan Agong
- Abdul Rahman Ya'kub (1928–2015), Malaysian politician
- Abdul Rauf Abdulkarim Shaikh, farmer
- Abdul Razak Hussein (1922–1976), second prime minister of Malaysia
- Abdul Razak Thaheem (1927–2010), Pakistani politician
- Abdul Razzaq (born 1979), Pakistani cricket coach and cricketer
- Abdul Razzaq Anjum (1952–2003), Pakistan Air Force Vice Marshal
- Abdul Salis (born 1979), British actor
- Abdul Sattar Edhi (1928–2016), Pakistani humanitarian, philanthropist and ascetic
- Abdul Sattar, Indian politician
- Abdul Shamsid-Deen (born 1968), American former basketball player
- Abdul Thompson Conteh (born 1970), Sierra Leonean footballer
- Abdul Vas (born 1981), Venezuelan artist
- Abdul Waris Muin (born 1968), Deputy Regent of North Penajam Paser, East Kalimantan (2025–2030)
- DJ Abdel, French DJ and producer of Moroccan descent playing hip hop, funk and contemporary R&B
- Prince Abdul Mateen (born 1991), Bruneian prince
- Prince Abdul Muntaqim (born 2007), Bruneian prince

== Surname ==
- Ari Abdul (born 2001), American singer
- David Abdul (born 1989), Aruban footballer
- Kareem Abdul-Jabbar (born 1947), American basketball player
- Lida Abdul (born 1973), Persian artist
- Paula Abdul (born 1962), American singer and television personality

== Fictional characters ==
- Abdul Alhazred, character created by American horror writer H. P. Lovecraft
- Abdul-Adl (阿布杜爾阿德勒), a character in the Taiwanese television series Port of Lies (八尺門的辯護人).
- Mohammed Avdol (also spelled Abdul), fictional character in the manga and anime JoJo's Bizarre Adventure created by Hirohiko Araki
- Abdul Abulbul Amir, one of two main characters in the 1877 music hall song "Abdul Abulbul Amir."

== See also ==
- Abdi, similar to Abdu
- Abdiel, Biblical name meaning "Servant of God"
- Abdu, a nickname for the compound name or a given name. In this case it's not necessarily a name given to a Muslim
- Abdullah (disambiguation), often confused with having the same meaning as Abdul
- Arabic name
- Arabic theophoric names, including a list of names where Abdul is an element.
- Turkish name
