= Salib =

Salib may refer to:

- Salib (Arabic: صليب, romanized: Ṣalīb, lit. 'cross'), the Arabic and Maltese term for the Christian cross
- Abd al-Masih Salib al-Masudi (1848–1935), Egyptian monk and author
- Salib tal-Għolja, or Laferla Cross, an early 20th-century religious landmark on the outskirts of Siġġiewi, Malta

== Places ==
- Deir al-Salib, a village in Masyaf District, Hama Governorate, Syria
- Hawir al-Salib, a village in Hama District, Hama Governorate, Syria
- Salib al-Turkman, a town in Latakia Governorate, Syria
- Wadi Salib (lit. 'Valley of the Cross'), a neighbourhood in Haifa, Israel

== See also ==
- Saliba (disambiguation)
- Salibi, a surname
- Saliby (disambiguation)
