= Yaris =

Yaris most commonly refers to a Toyota vehicle with the name in various forms:

- Toyota Yaris, a hatchback for the Asian markets, also known as the Yaris L in China
- Toyota Vitz, also sold as the Toyota Yaris hatchback
- Toyota Belta, also sold as the Toyota Yaris sedan
- Toyota Vios, also sold as the Toyota Yaris in the second and third generation
- Toyota Yaris iA, a sedan for the North, Latin and South American market, formerly the Scion iA until August 2016, based on the third-generation Mazda2
- Toyota Yaris Cross, a crossover SUV
- Yaris (video game), a video game promoting the Toyota models.

== Other uses ==
- Yarış, Yenice, a village in Turkey
- Sol Yaris, a Brazilian paraglider design
- Abdi Haji Yaris, Somali politician
