= Abdi Pasha =

Abdi Pasha may refer to:

- Abdurrahman Abdi Arnavut Pasha (1616–1686), Ottoman governor of Baghdad, Egypt (1676–80), Bosnia (1680–82), and Budin (1682–86)
- Abdurrahman Abdi Pasha (court historian) (1630–1692), Ottoman official and historian
- Keki Abdi Pasha (died 1789), Ottoman governor of Aleppo (1784–85), Egypt (1788–89, 1789), and Diyarbekir
- Abdülkerim Nadir Pasha (1807–1883), Ottoman soldier, also known as Çırpanlı Abdi Pasha

== See also ==
- Abdi, a male name
- Pasha, a title in the Ottoman political and military systems
