= Demolition of al-Baqi =

Destruction of cemetery in Medina

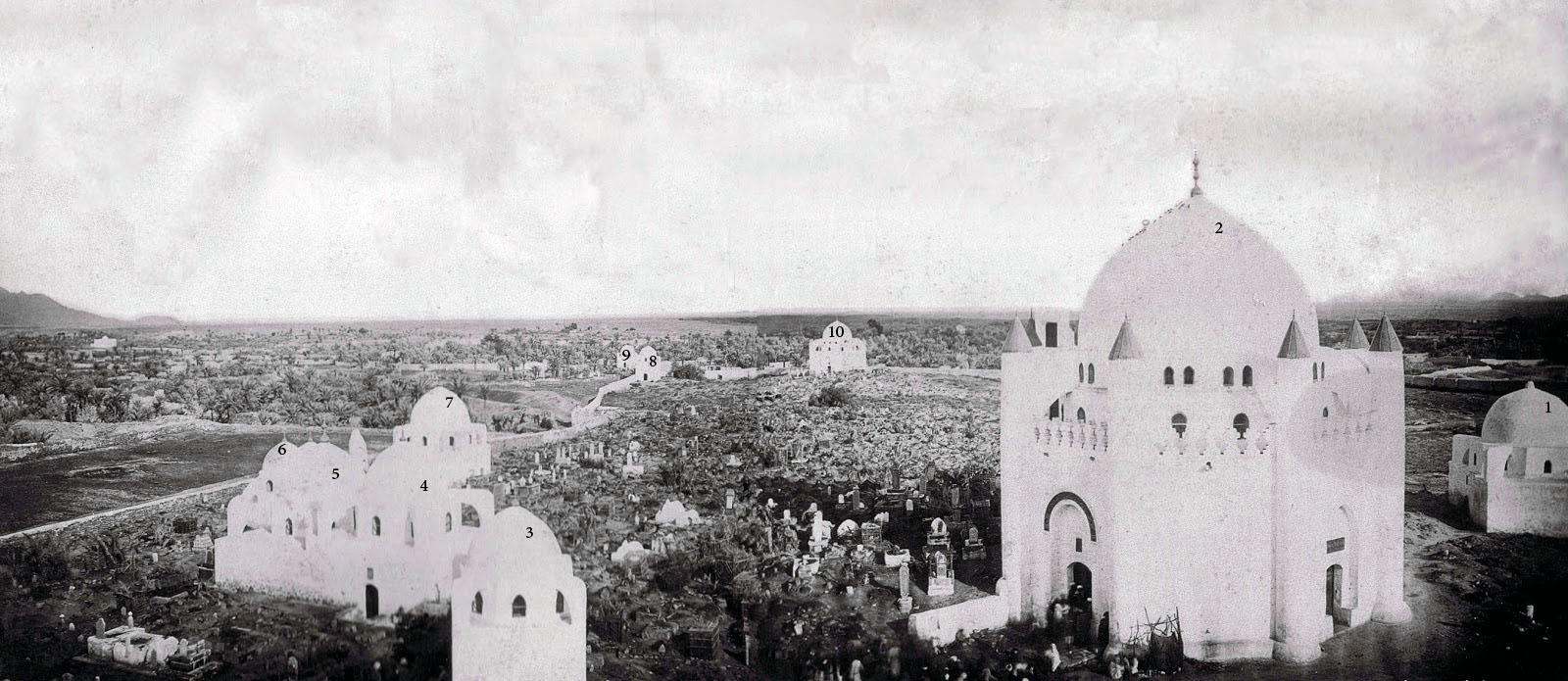
- Jannat al-Baqi in the 1910s, before its second demolition
- Date: 1806 and 1925 (or 1926)
- Location: Medina, Saudi Arabia; 24°28′01″N 39°36′50″E
- Organised by: House of Saud
- Outcome: Mass destruction of the buildings, and domes of the cemetery

Al-Baqi Cemetery, the oldest and one of the two most important Islamic graveyards located in Medina, in current-day Saudi Arabia, was demolished in 1806 and, following reconstruction in the mid-19th century, was destroyed again in 1925 or 1926. An alliance of the House of Saud and the followers of the Salafi/Wahhabi movement known as the Emirate of Diriyah carried out the first demolition. The Sultanate of Nejd, also ruled by the House of Saud and followers of Wahhabism, carried out the second demolition. In both cases, the actors were motivated by the Wahhabi interpretation of Islam, which prohibits the building of monuments on graves.

== Background ==
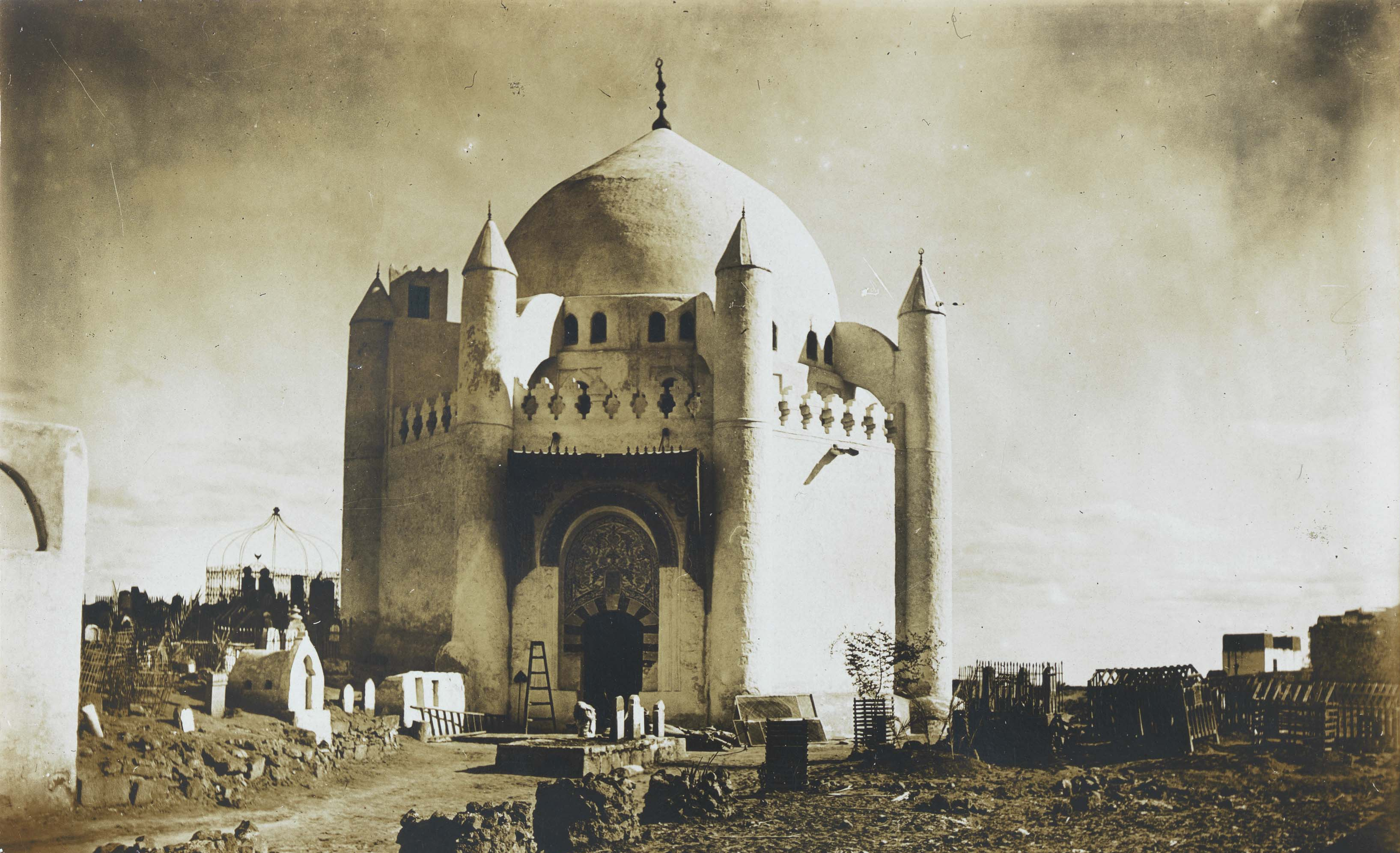
Mausoleum of four Imams along with Abbas ibn Abd al-Muttalib.

Baqi al-Gharqad (Arabic: بقیع الغرقد, "the field of thorny trees"), also known as Jannat al-Baqi (Arabic: جنة البقیع, "garden of tree stumps"), was used as a cemetery before the advent of Islam. People buried at al-Baqīʿ include Islamic prophet Muhammad's wives, his daughters, his grandson Hasan, Companions of Muhammad, and his infant son Ibrahim. Many narrations say that Muhammad visited this cemetery regularly to pray for God's forgiveness for those buried there.

It gained further attention after the first companion of Muhammad, 'Uthman ibn Maz'un (or As'ad ibn Zurarah), was buried there in 625. Four Shia Imams, Hasan ibn Ali, Ali ibn Husayn, Muhammad al-Baqir, and Ja'far al-Sadiq, were also buried there, making it an important location for Shia Muslims. Historical records show that there were domes, cupolas, and mausoleums in Jannat al-Baqi before the 20th century; today it is a bare land without any buildings.

An alliance between Muhammad ibn Abd al-Wahhab and Muhammad ibn Saud led to the formation the first Saudi State (also known as the Emirate of Diriyah), challenging the authority of the Ottoman Empire. Most of the Najd was under Ibn Saud's control by the time Muhammad bin Saud died in 1765. By 1806, the Hijaz, including Mecca and Medina, was under the control of the Sauds.

The expansion of the Wahhabi movement came at the expense of the Ottoman Empire's control over Islam's holiest places. Consequently, the Ottoman Empire sent armies and defeated the first Saudi state in the Ottoman–Wahhabi War (1811–1818). Years later in 1924–1925, the Saud clan regained control over Hijaz and the Kingdom of Hejaz and Nejd was formed under Abdul Aziz ibn Saud's rule.

The Wahhabis tried to carry out the demolition within a legal religious context, since they regarded the shrines as "idolatrous" and believed that marking graves is bid'a (heresy), based on their interpretation of Qur'anic verses regarding graves and shrines. They drew from the story of the golden calf mentioned in the Qur'an where the Israelites manufactured idols and prayed to them, inviting divine wrath. Some Muslims see the story as a "blanket prohibition" against the worship of images and shrines.

On the other hand, Shia scholars used a number of different verses and traditions to support the practice of building shrines over the graves of Islamic saints. According to Shia scholar Mohammad Jafar Tabasi, the graves of Shia Imams buried in al-Baqi had been revered for hundreds of years and none of the Sunni scholars (ulamas) before Muhammad bin Abdul Wahhab regarded the shrines as innovation. Weeks before the second demolition, at the request of Ibn Bulayhid, a group of fifteen scholars from Medina unanimously issued a fatwa (an Islamic legal ruling) condemning the making of mausoleums around the graves.

According to Islamic studies scholar Adeel Mohammadi, the Wahhabis' destruction of al-Baqi also had political roots. The leader of a Muslim community is responsible for enjoining good and forbidding wrong (al ʿamr bi-l maʿrūf wa-n nahy ʿan al munkar) and he can fulfill this responsibility only by having political power. The destruction by the Wahhabis was a political act to establish Najdi authority in the Hijaz, consisting of the religious authority of Najd, Wahhabi scholars, and the political authority of the Saudi family. Mohammadi argues that by the destruction, "Saudi authorities sought to broadcast their newly acquired political power".

It has been suggested that the veneration of Islamic shrines represented the desire for a united theological approach to God and a political approach to land. Wahhabism also views the destruction of the site as justified on theological and political principles. According to Mohammadi, the destruction could be carried out with the purpose of indicating victory over Shia, as al-Baqi is the burial place of a number of Shia Imams and members of Ahl al-Bayt ("People of the House") – Muhammad's family.

== Demolitions ==
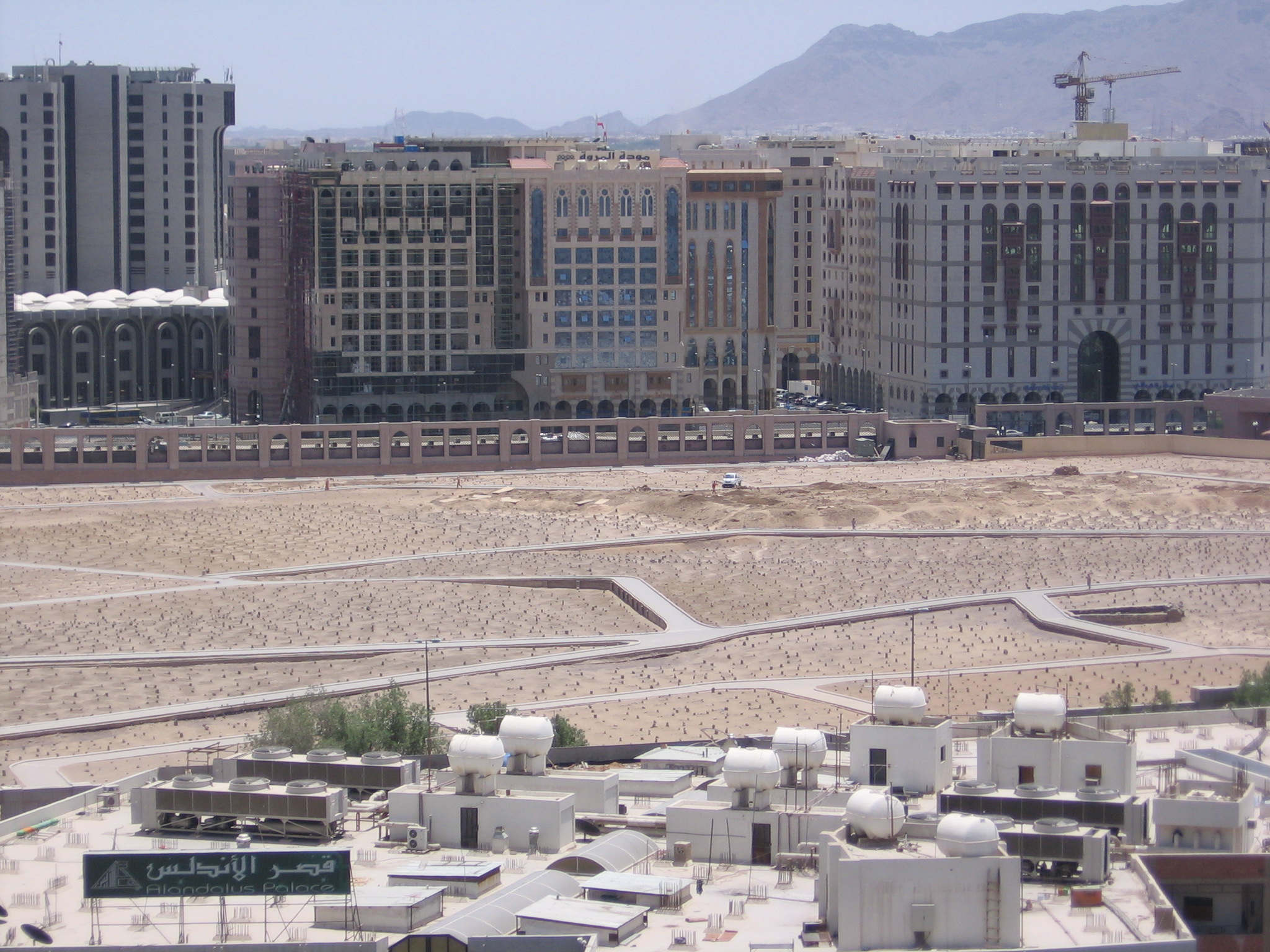
How al-Baqi cemetery appears in 2008 after the demolitions.

=== First demolition ===
At the beginning of the House of Saud's nineteenth century (1806) control over Mecca and Medina, they demolished many of the religious buildings, including tombs and mosques, whether inside or outside the Baqi, in accordance with their doctrine. These were razed to the ground and plundered for their decorations and goods.

After taking control of the holy cities, the Saudis tried to create obstacles to prevent non-Wahhabi Muslims from performing the Hajj (annual pilgrimage). In the next few years, they gradually increased the Hajj duty. They also banned pilgrims from bringing musical instruments and mahmal (richly decorated palanquins) – both often brought by pilgrims but incompatible with Wahhabi religious standards – and later barred "boys or other beardless persons". In 1805, a year before the destruction, Iraqi and Iranian Muslims were not allowed to perform Hajj. Syrians and Egyptians were refused permission to perform Hajj in 1806 and 1807. Maghrebi Muslims were not prevented from performing the Hajj.

European traveler Johann Ludwig Burckhardt visited the cemetery in 1815 after the first destruction. Seeing the ruins of the domes around the cemetery, he said that people of Medina were "niggardly", paying little attention to honoring "their celebrated countrymen". However, the destruction did not prevent residents from performing their rituals.

The Ottoman Sultan Mahmud II ordered the governor of Egypt, Muhammad Ali Pasha, to retake the territories controlled by the Wahhabi rebels, starting the Ottoman–Wahhabi War. Muhammad Ali Pasha's son, Ibrahim Pasha, defeated the rebel clans at the Battle of Diriyah in 1818. By the order of Sultan Mahmud II the Ottomans built and renovated buildings, domes, and mosques in "splendid aesthetic style" from 1848 to 1860. Sir Richard Francis Burton, who visited Medina in 1853 disguised as an Afghan Muslim named "Abdullah", said that there were fifty-five mosques and shrines after the reconstruction by the Ottomans. Another English adventurer visiting Medina in 1877–1878 described the city as a "small beautiful city resembling Istanbul". He mentions its "white walls, golden slender minarets and green fields". Also, Ibrahim Rifat Pasha, an Egyptian official travelling between 1901 and 1908, described sixteen domes marking individual and/or a collection of graves.

=== Second demolition ===
The House of Saud regained control of Hijaz in 1924 or 1925. The following year Ibn Saud granted permission to destroy the site with religious authorization provided by Qadi Abd Allah ibn Bulayhid; the demolition began on 21 April 1926 (or 1925) by the Ikhwan ("Brothers"), a Wahhabi religious militia. The demolition included destroying even the simplest gravestones. British convert Eldon Rutter compared the demolition to an earthquake: "All over the cemetery nothing was to be seen but little indefinite mounds of earth and stones, pieces of timber, iron bars, blocks of stone, and a broken rubble of cement and bricks, strewn about."

The workers destroying the buildings received 1,000 Majidi Riyal, the unit of currency at the time. The destroyed domes included those of Abdullah ibn Abdul-Muttalib and Aminah, Muhammad's father and mother, respectively; Isma'il ibn Jafar, the eldest son of Ja'far al-Sadiq; Abbas ibn Abd al-Muttalib and Hamza ibn Abdul-Muttalib, both uncles of Muhammad; Ibrahim ibn Muhammad, Muhammad's son; Malik ibn Anas; Uthman ibn Affan; four Shia Imams; Hasan ibn Ali, the grandson of Muhammad, Ali Ibn Hussain, Muhammad al-Baqir, Ja'far al-Sadiq and 7,000 people who were said to have ties with the Islamic prophet Muhammad.

== Reactions ==
The second demolition was discussed in Majles-e Shora-ye Melli (The National Consultative Assembly of Iran) and a group of representatives was sent to Hijaz to investigate. In recent years, efforts were made by Iranian religious scholars and political figures to restore the cemetery and its shrines, according to the Encyclopaedia Islamica. Both Sunni and Shia Muslims protested against the destruction and rallies were held annually in India, Pakistan, Iran, and the United States. The day is regarded as Yaum-e Gham ("Day of Sorrow") by many Shias. According to the Encyclopaedia Islamica, prominent Sunni theologians and intellectuals have condemned the "unfit" situation of the al-Baqi cemetery but the Saudi authorities have so far ignored all criticism and rejected any requests for restoration of the tombs and mausoleums.

== Panoramic photograph ==
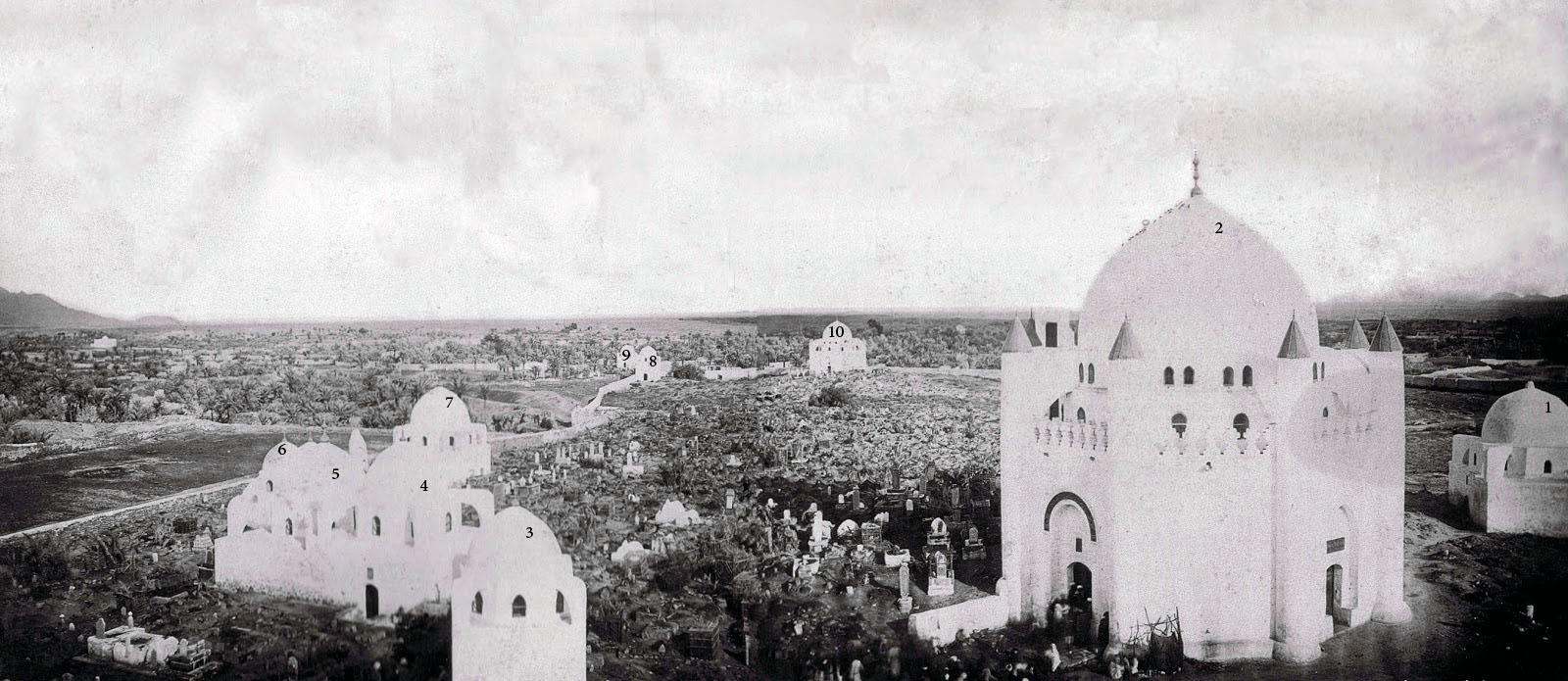
Panoramic view of the Jannat al-Baqi' before its destruction.

== See also ==
- Wahhabi sack of Karbala
- Destruction of early Islamic heritage sites in Saudi Arabia

== Bibliography ==
- Vassiliev, Alexei (2013). The History of Saudi Arabia. Saqi Books. ISBN 978-0-86356-779-7.
