= Poker in 1982 =

This article summarizes the events related to the world of poker in 1982.

== Major Tournaments ==
=== 1982 World Series of Poker ===
Main tournament exceeds 100 players for the first time. Jack Straus wins the main tournament.

=== 1982 Super Bowl of Poker ===
Ed Stevens wins the main tournament.

== Poker Hall of Fame ==
Tom Abdo is inducted.
