= Mausoleum of Abdullah ibn Ali Zayn al-Abidin =

Islamic burial site in Alexandria, Egypt

Coordinates: 31°11′57″N 29°54′33″E

- مقام عبد الله بن علي زين العابدين
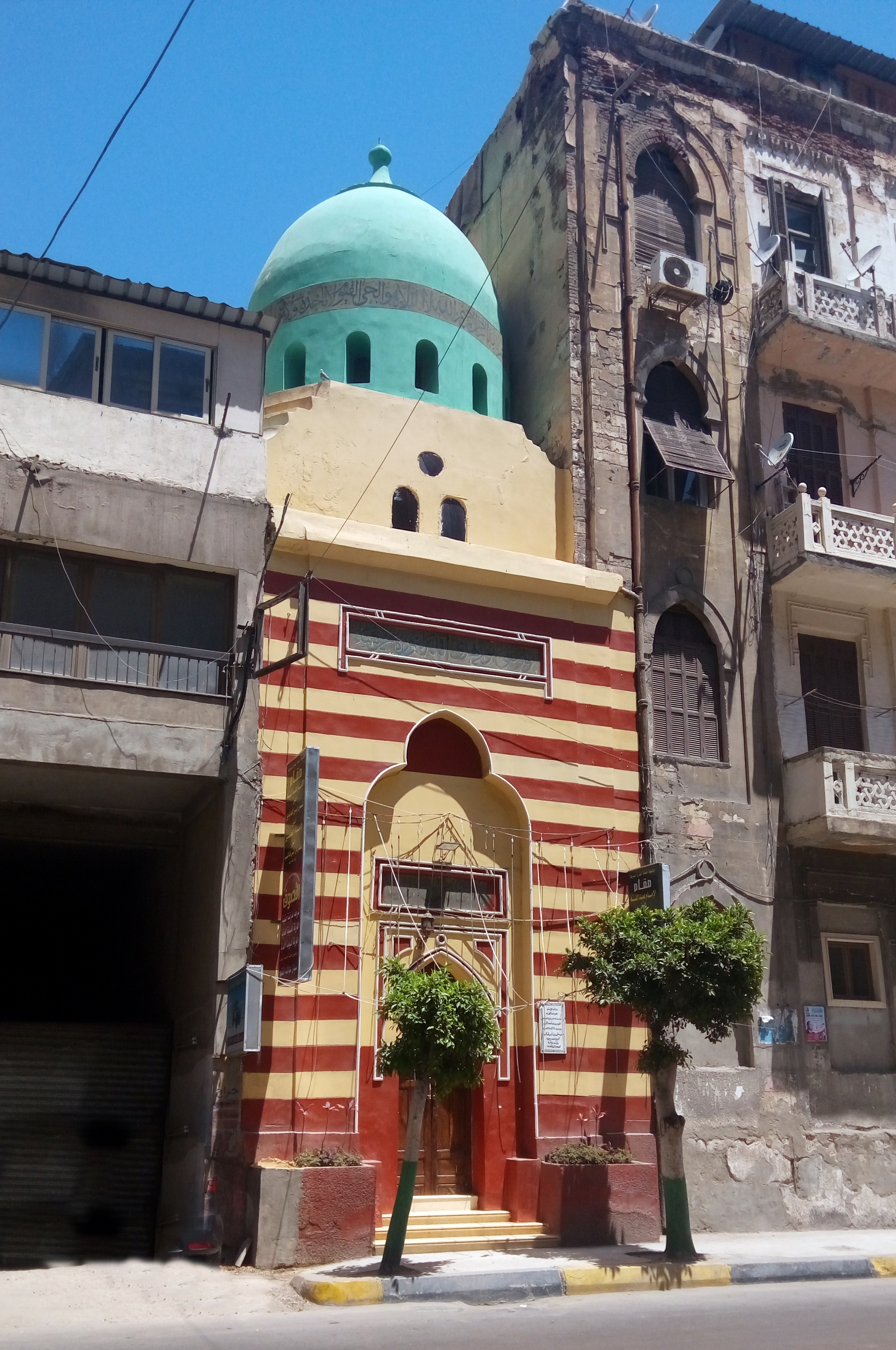
- Entrance of mausoleum of Abdullah ibn Ali Zayn al-Abidin
- Interactive map of Mausoleum of Abdullah ibn Ali Zayn al-Abidin
- Location: Egypt
- Type: Islamic

Mausoleum of Abdullah ibn Ali Zayn al-Abidin (Arabic: مقام عبد الله بن علي زين العابدين) is a mausoleum dedicated to Abdullah ibn Ali Zayn al-Abidin, grandson of Husayn ibn Ali. It is located at the side of Fouad Street in the city of Alexandria, Egypt. It is located opposite of the Mausoleum of Yacoub ibn Abdul Rahman ibn Mohammed.

== History ==
To avoid the strife and chaos amongst the people in Iraq under the Umayyad Caliphate after the demise of Husayn ibn Ali, Abdullah ibn Ali Zayn al-Abidin travelled to Alexandria with his aunt Zainab bint Husayn ibn Ali. He was also accompanied by his companion, the Tabi'ee, Yaqub ibn Abd al-Rahman. The place where the shrine now stands was formerly an area where Abdullah ibn Ali used to teach the locals about Islam. The shrine was later closed when it had fallen into state of ruin, only to be reopened in 2017 after it had been restored.

== Architecture ==
The shrine is built in a style reminiscent of Mamluk architecture. The dome of the shrine has verses from the Ayat al-Kursi of the Quran engraved on it. Both Abdullah ibn Ali and his wife are buried in the shrine.

== Gallery ==
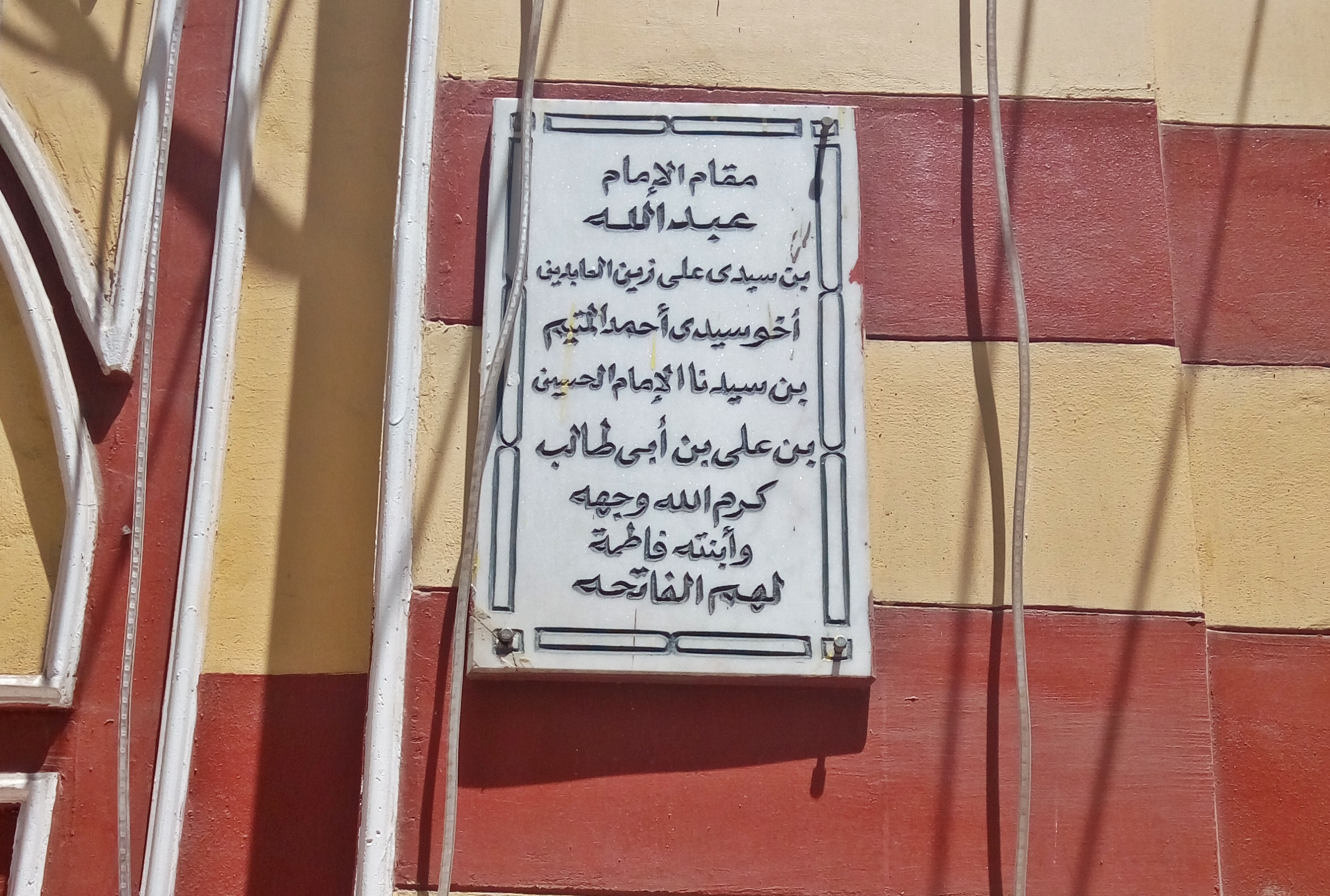
Information on the entrance of the Mausoleum

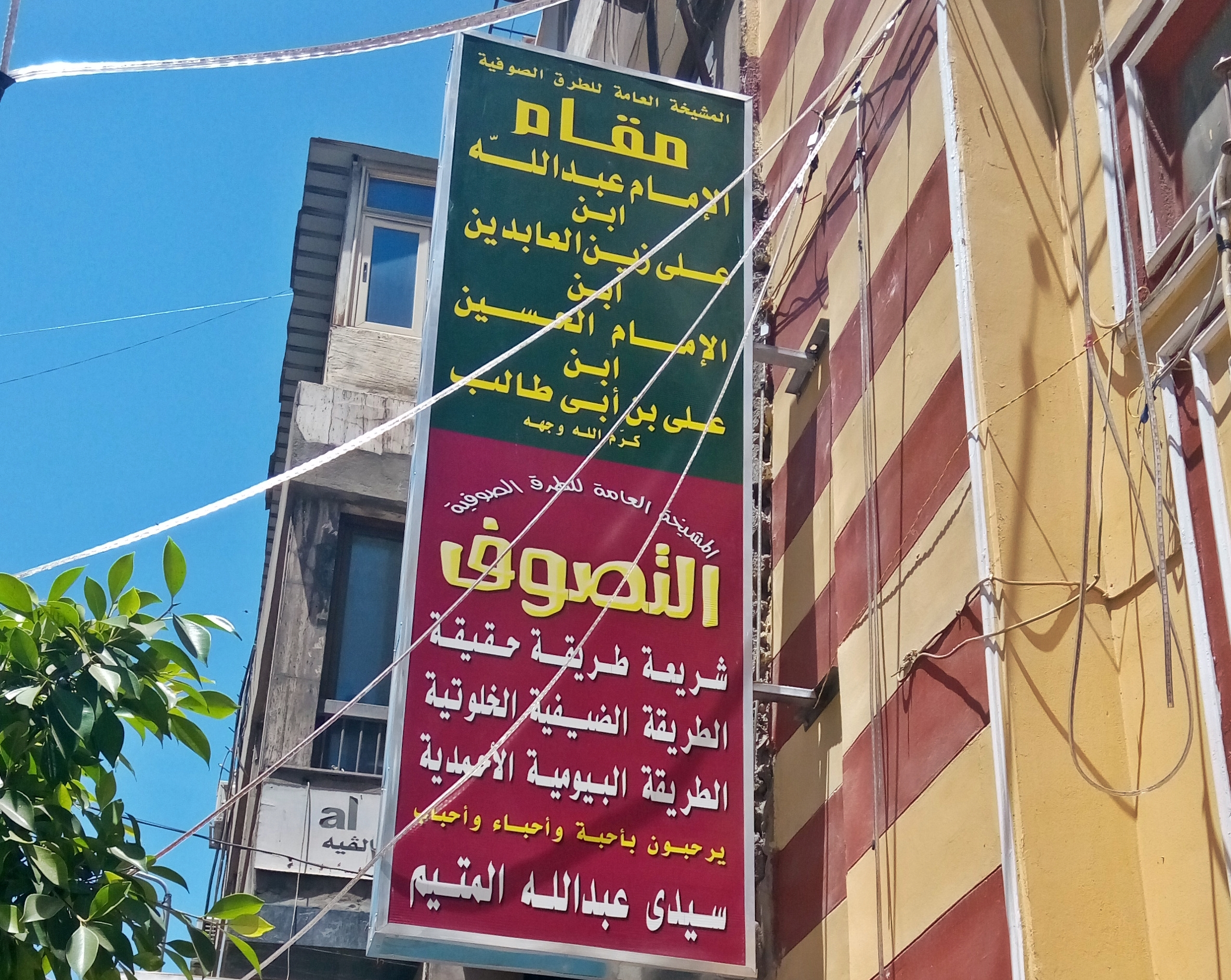
Information on the entrance of the Mausoleum
