= Abu Khalid al-Kabuli =

Companion of Imams Ali al-Sajjad and Muhammad al-Baqir

- أبو خالد الكابلي

Personal life
- Born: Kabul, present-day Afghanistan
- Region: Medina
- Main interest: Ḥadīth

Religious life
- Religion: Islam
- Denomination: Shia

Muslim leader
- Teacher: ʿAli Zayn al-ʿAbidīn, Muhammad al-Baqir

Abu Khalid al-Kabuli (Arabic: أبو خالد الكابلي) known as Kankar, was a Shia companion of Zayn al-ʿAbidīn and Muhammad al-Baqir, and an eminent scholar in the 1st/7th century. He was from Kabul then traveled to the Hijaz and was considered a supporter of Muhammad ibn al-Hanafiyya, but with the guidance of Yahya ibn Umm Tawil, he went to Zayn al-Abidin, was attracted to him, and acknowledged his Imamate.

== Life ==
He was born in Kabul in present-day Afghanistan, though the date of his birth is not known. Initially, he was one of the companions of Muhammad ibn al-Hanafiyya, whose followers were known as Kaysanites, but like many Kaysanites later became a follower and companion of Ali al-Sajjad. Ismailis believe that Ibn Hanafiyah was appointed by Husayn as a "temporary imam" as a cover to protect the real imam, Zayn al-ʿAbidīn. While accompanying and serving Muhammad ibn Hanafiyya, he met Zayn al-Abidin due to the guidance and insistence of Yahya ibn Umm Tawil, and because of the great respect that Muhammad ibn al-Hanifiyya had for Zayn al-Abidin. According to a tradition, when Zain al-Abidin called him by his childhood name, Kankar, he became sure of his Imamate. His mother gave him the nickname Kankar, but was not known by this nickname among the people of that time.

According to the prominent 10th century Shia theologian Al-Fadl ibn Shadhan, during the lifetime of Zayn al-Abidin, few people knew his Imamate and followed him, except for five: Sa'id ibn Jubayr, Said ibn al-Musayyib, Jubayr ibn Muṭʽim, Yahya ibn Umm al-Tawil, and Abu Khaled al-Kabuli. Abu Khaled Kabuli spent most of his life in Medina from 61 to 114.
