= Mausoleum of Yacoub bin Abd al-Rahman =

Burial site in Alexandria, Egypt

Coordinates: 31°11′56″N 29°54′33″E

- مقام يعقوب بن عبد الرحمن
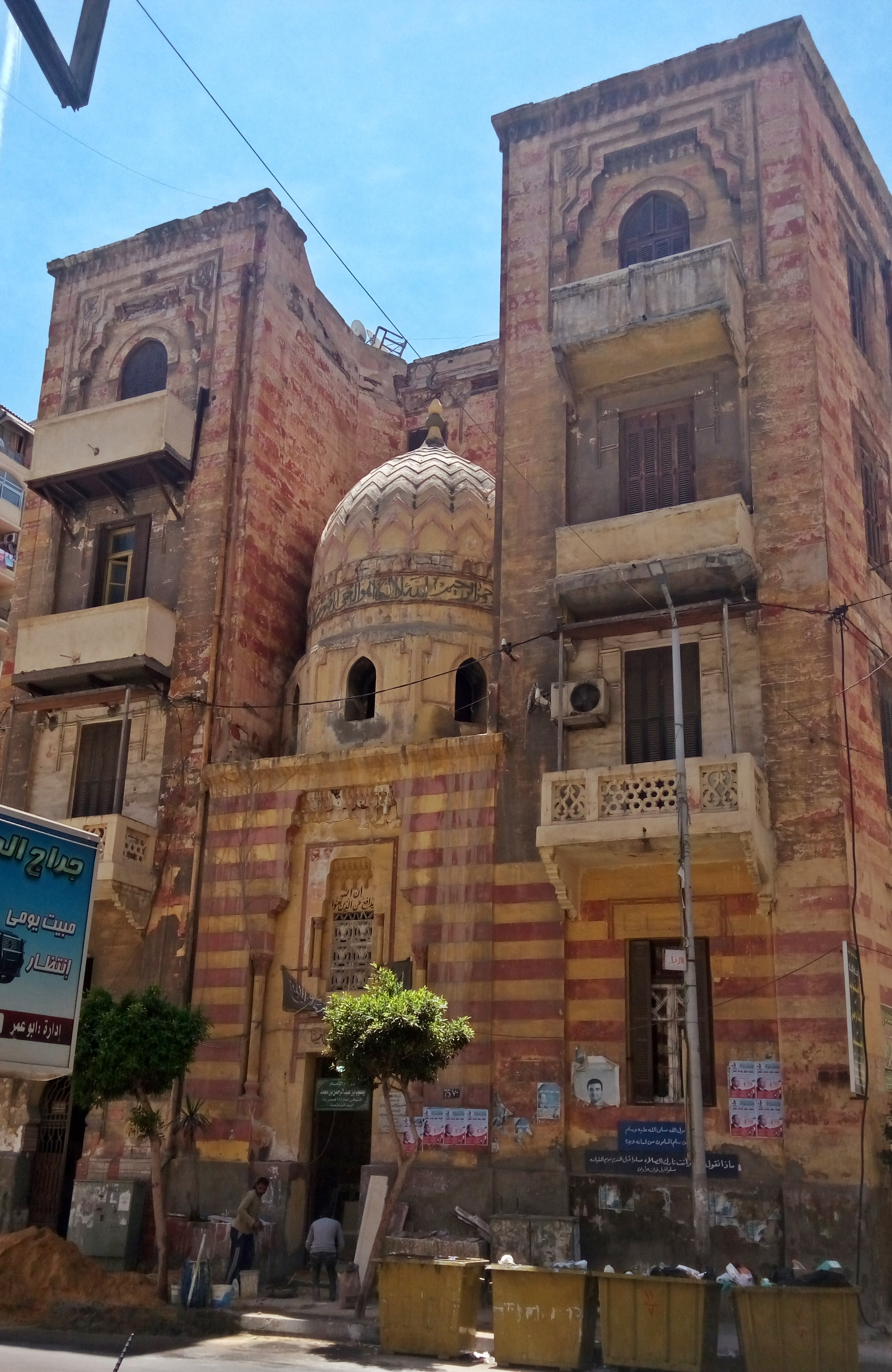
- Entrance of mausoleum of Yacoub bin Abd al-Rahman
- Interactive map of Mausoleum of Yacoub bin Abd al-Rahman
- Location: Egypt
- Type: Islamic

Mausoleum of Yacoub bin Abd al-Rahman (Arabic: مقام يعقوب بن عبد الرحمن) is a mausoleum dedicated to Yacoub bin Abd al-Rahman, tabi'e, qāriʾ and hadith narrator. It is located at the side of Fouad Street in the city of Alexandria, Egypt. It is opposite the Mausoleum of Abdullah ibn Ali Zayn al-Abidin.

== History ==
Yacoub bin Abd al-Rahman bin Muhammad, who died in the year 181 AH, is mentioned in sources to have arrived in Alexandria with his companion Abdullah ibn Ali Zayn al-Abidin and his aunt Zaynab bint al-Husayn, after the turmoil of the killing of Husayn. They settled in Alexandria, making it a place for spreading Islam.

Yaqub ibn Abd al-Rahman and Abdullah ibn Ali Zayn al-Abidin established the place of the shrine as a headquarters for teaching people and spreading the Islamic call and prophetic traditions, with Abdullah ibn Ali Zayn al-Abidin's shrine located opposite on the same street.

Sources mention that Yaqub ibn Abd al-Rahman's lineage traces back to the village of al-Qar in Medina, and he narrated hadiths from his father, as well as from Musa ibn Uqbah, Ibn Wahb, and Ibn Ma'in. He was known to be proficient in hadiths, and he is buried alongside his family in the complex of shrines in the Abu al-Abbas area.

To avoid the chaos happening in Iraq under the Umayyad Caliphate after Husayn ibn Ali was killed, Yaqub ibn Abd al-Rahman travelled to Egypt along with his companion, Abdullah ibn Ali Zayn al-Abidin, where they reached Alexandria. Both men taught the religion of Islam to the locals at the site where both shrines are now present.

== Architecture ==
The area of the shrine is approximately 25 square metres. The dome of the shrine has the Ayat al-Kursi engraved into it. Inside, the grave of Yaqub ibn Abd al-Rahman is under a wooden cenotaph that is covered with a green cloth.

== Incidents ==
On April 11, 2018, a huge fire broke out at the shrine. After an investigation into the cause of the fire, it was found out that the fire occurred due to an electrical short circuit setting fire to large quantities of waste material dumped within the shrine. No casualties were reported. The shrine underwent a severe restoration after the incident.

== Gallery ==
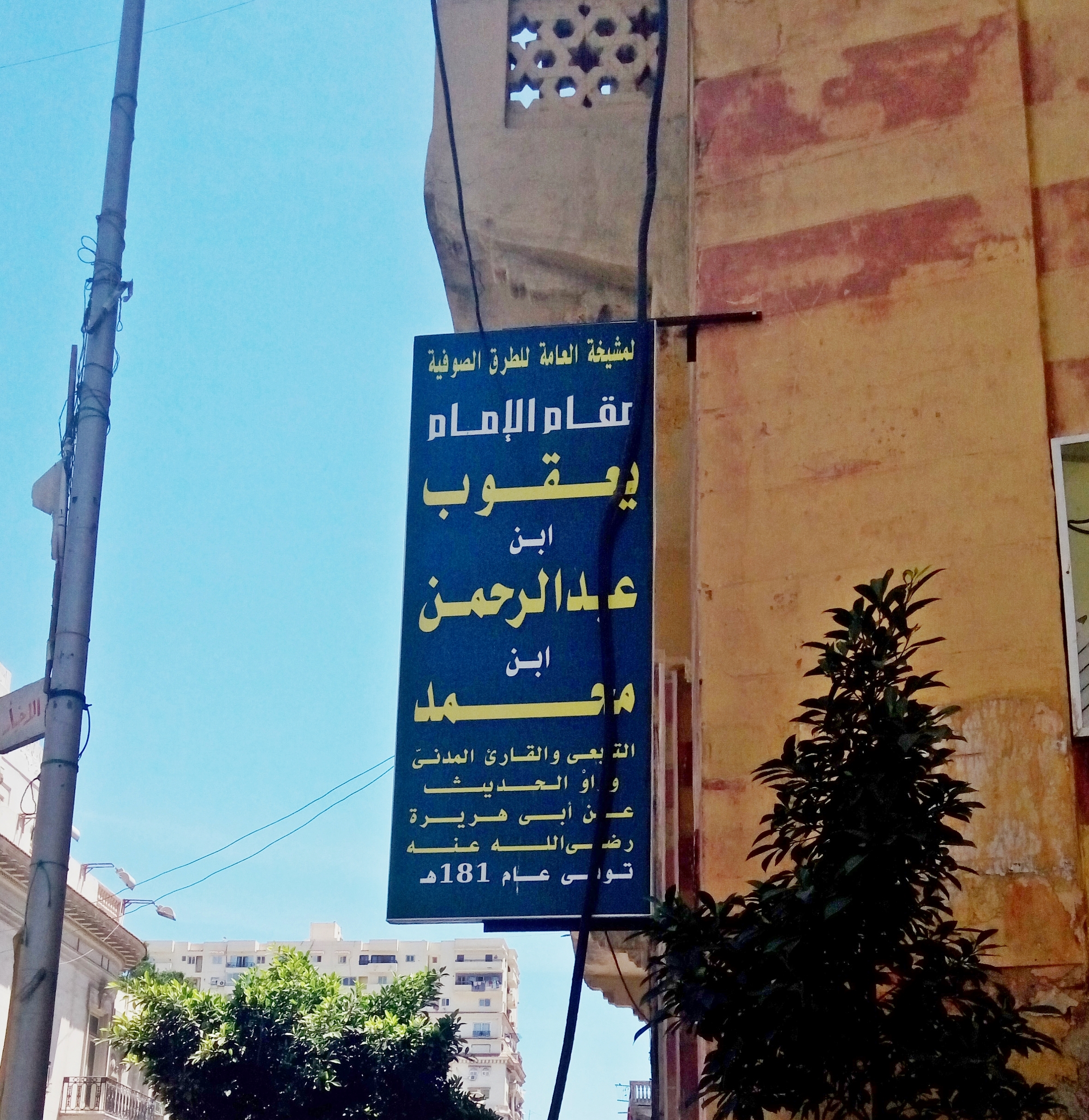
Information on the entrance of the Mausoleum
