= Aban ibn Taghlib =

Shia Muslim and disciple of Shia Imams al-Sajjad, al-Baqir and al-Sadiq

Abān in Taghlib

Personal life
- Died: 141 AH (758 CE)
- Region: Likely Kufa
- Main interest(s): Tafsir, Qur'an recitation, hadith, fiqh, philology
- Notable work(s): Kitab al-Qira'at; Ma‘ani al-Qur’an; Al-Gharib; Al-Fada’il; Kitab Siffin

Religious life
- Religion: Islam
- Denomination: Shia

Muslim leader
- Teacher: Ali al-Sajjad, Muhammad al-Baqir, Ja'far al-Sadiq

Abu Sa'id Aban ibn Taghlib ibn Rabah al-Kindi (Arabic: أبو سعيد أبان ابن تغلب ابن رباح الكندي) (died 758 AD/141 AH) was a Shia Muslim jurist, muhaddith, qāriʾ (reciter of Quran), mufassir and a disciple of Shia Imams Ali al-Sajjad (680–712), Muhammad al-Baqir (712–732) and Ja'far al-Sadiq (732–765).

== Background ==
Al-Baqir is reported to have praised Aban and told him, "Sit in the mosque of Kufa and give legal judgment to the people. Indeed I would like to see among my Shia, people like you." He was one of the great reciters and recited the Qur'an in a special way that was famous among reciters. Shaykh Tusi quoted Muhammad bin Musa bin Abi Maryam Sahib al-Lula'u as saying that he was the most prominent person of his time in this art. In addition to Quran and Hadith, Aban was also an expert in all sciences of jurisprudence, literature, vocabulary and syntax. According to TusiJafarSadiq, he once appointed him for a literary debate with the claimant. Shia scholars have considered him to be Thiqa (transmitter of hadiths), and scholars of Sunni scholars such as Ahmad Ibn Hanbal, Yahya Ibn Moin, Abu Hatim and Nasa'i have confirmed his trustworthiness. He is considered one of the frequently quoted jurists of Ja'far's period, When he died al-Sadiq is reported to have said, "I would love to have my Shi'a like Aban b. Taghlib," and "his death grieved my heart." Aban's name appears in a good number of traditions, mostly of a practical nature. The Sheikhs of Hadith of Aban except for the 3 mentioned imams and Anas bin Malik are as follows: Sulayman b. Mihran al-A'mash, Muhammad Ibn Mankader, Simāk bin Kharasha, Ibrahim bin al-Ashtar, Abu Basir al-Asadi, Aasim bin Abi al-Najud, Abu Amr Ishaq ibn Mirar al-Shaybani, Minhal b. Amr al-Asadi, Hakem Ibn Utaiba, Abu Ishaq Amr Ibn Abd Allah Sabiei, Fuzil Ibn Amr Fuqaimi, Jahm bin UthmanMadani, Udi bin Thabit, Talha bin Masraf, Atiyya b. Sa'd b. Junada al-Awfi, IkrimahMoli Ibn Abbas and Umar bin ZarHamdani.

Most of the sources of his epithet are given by Abu Saeed, some by Abu Saad or bin Saeed, and others also mention Abu Umayma.

== Life ==
There is no information about his birthplace but he is believed to be from Kufa. Aban devoted most of his life to Ahl al-Bayt. He studied various branches of science, in particular hadith from them and attained a prominent position in the school of Imam al-Sadiq. Aban is famous to have quoted extensively from Imam Sadiq and it is reported that he narrated thirty thousand hadiths from him. He is also considered the most outstanding Quranic reciter and his style of Quranic recitation is very famous. He was the first person to publish a book about the meaning of the Holy Quraan which was renewed with different interpretations every year and is still used by many scholars and students even today.

He was considered a master of Quran traditions, jurisprudence, literature, syntax and philology. He was Appointed by Imam Mohammad al-Baqir to work in Medina. Shaykh Tusi has reported that Imam al-Sadiq appointed him to conduct scholarly discourse. Imam Baqir ordered him to "Sit in the Prophet’s mosque in Medina and provide answers to legal questions (wa afti ’l-nās); for I would like it to be known that people like yourself belong to my shīʿa"

== Authenticity ==
Shi'ite scholars consider Aban ibn Taghlib as a reliable narrator. Some Sunni rijal scholars such as Al-Nasa'i and Al-Dhahabi confirmed his reliability and trustworthiness in their biographical dictionary, saying "Aban ibn Taghlib the Kufan, a staunch Shi'ite but trustful, to us his trust, and to him his heresy". He also narrated that Ahmad ibn Hanbal, Yahya ibn Mu'in and Abu Hatam confirmed him as trustworthy.

== Books ==
Books compiled by Aban are now missing but the books ascribed to him in the catalogues are as follows:

1. Ma'ani al-Quran
2. Kitab al-Qira'at
3. Al-Garib fil-Quran
4. Al-Fadail
5. Kitab Siffin

Al-Ghareeb was the first work of its type and topic and was very important in terms of vocabulary and interpretation. In explaining the strange words of the Quran, the author has relied on the evidence he heard from the Arabs.
