= Mohammad Abdi =

Iranian writer and film critic (born 1974)

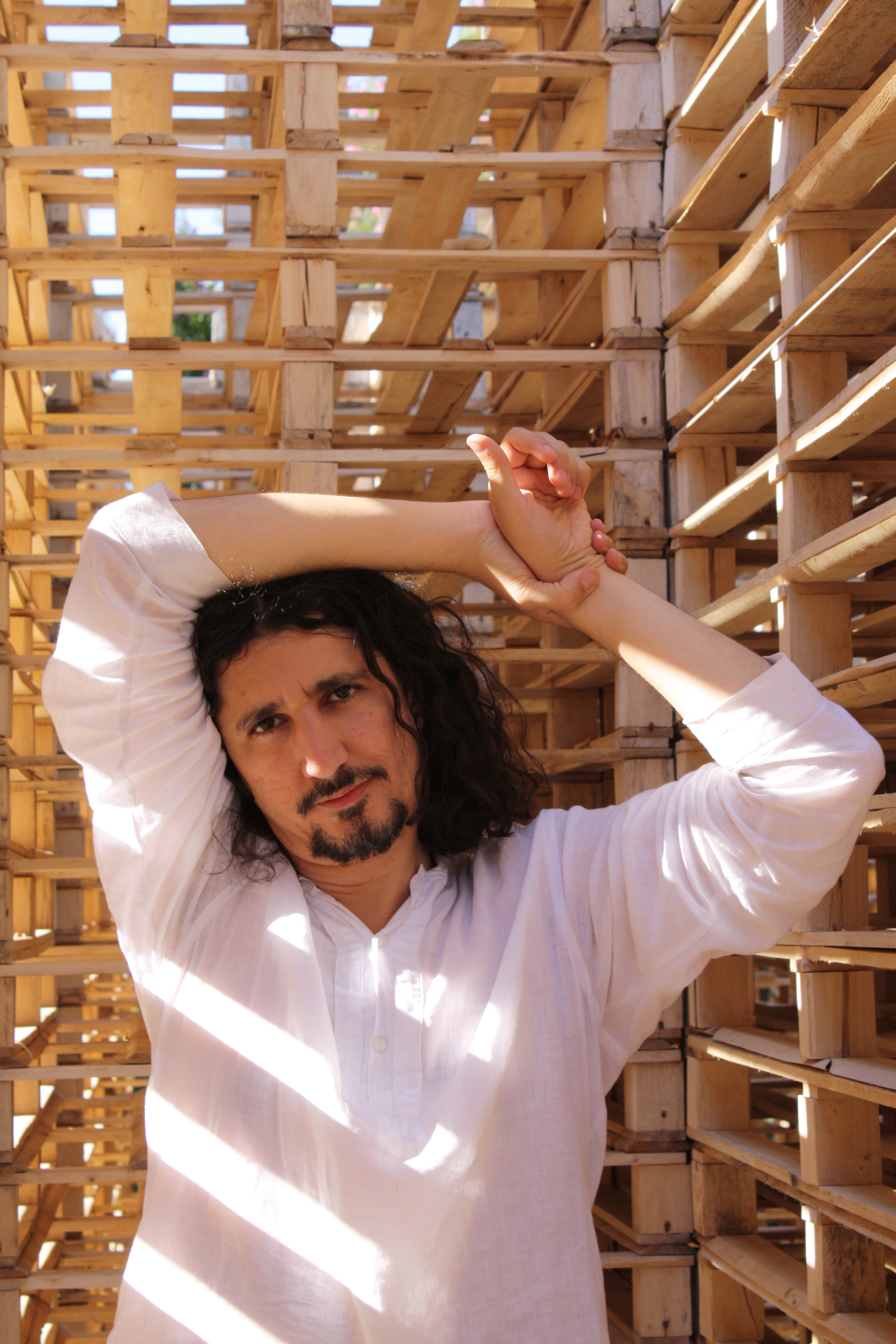
- Born: September 1974 (age 51)
- Occupations: An Iranian author, Film critic, Art researcher; Novelist and filmmaker
- Notable work: He Wrote a novel called "Five Women" was published London in 2020.

Mohammad Abdi (Persian: محمد عبدی, Tehran, Iran, September 1974) is an Iranian author, film critic and art researcher.

== Career ==
Abdi started his career in 1990. He has written articles and film reviews for many publications both in Persian and English.

In 2003, Abdi along with a few other Iranian film critics, was arrested in Iran charged with "promoting western culture", consequently Abdi left Iran in 2005 and since then, he has been living in London, UK.

Abdi has been member of jury in a few film festivals such as Busan, Moscow, Thessaloniki and Kyiv.

== Books ==
- In 1998, Abdi Published his first book " Film Criticism in Iran" about the history of film review and film analysis in Iran. From 1999 to 2002, he served as the editor-in- chief for "Honar Haftom" (Seventh Art) magazine.
- His first short story collection with the title of "Marg-e yek Roshanfekr" ( Death of an Intellectual) was published in 2002 in Tehran, Iran. His second short story collection called "Az Opera Lezzat bebbar"(Enjoy the Opera) was published in Paris in 2013.
- His first novel called "Five Women" was published London in 2020.
- Mohammad, Abdi (2011). Death of an intellectual: Marg-e Yek Roshanfekr. H&S Media. ISBN 978-1-780-83064-3.

=== Films ===
- Mohammad Abdi has made documentary films on famous Iranian cultural figures such as Ebrahim Golestan(2018), Susan Taslimi(2019) and Reza Ghassemi(2013), all premiered at SOAS, University of London.
