= Hawir al-Salib =

Hawir al-Salib حوير الصليب
- Village
- Location in Syria
- Coordinates: 35°3′16″N 36°32′35″E
- Country: Syria
- Governorate: Hama
- District: Hama
- Subdistrict: Hama

Population (2004)
  - Total: 970
- Time zone: UTC+3 (AST)
- City Qrya Pcode: C2971

Hawir al-Salib (Arabic: حوير الصليب) is a Syrian village located in the Subdistrict of the Hama District in the Hama Governorate. According to the Syria Central Bureau of Statistics (CBS), Hawir al-Salib had a population of 970 in the 2004 census. Its inhabitants are predominantly Alawites.

== Bibliography ==
- Robinson, E.; Smith, E. (1841). Biblical Researches in Palestine, Mount Sinai and Arabia Petraea: A Journal of Travels in the year 1838. Vol. 3. Boston: Crocker & Brewster.
