= Abdul Rauf Abdulkarim Shaikh =

Abdul Rauf Abdulkarim Shaikh is a progressive farmer, residing near Banavasi, Karnataka, India who is known for innovative cultivation of pineapple and he is conferred with honorary doctorate by University of Agricultural Sciences, Dharwad, for his achievement in horticulture.

== Early life ==
Due to family problems, he could not continue his education and started working in agricultural farms at the age of 14 and gradually purchased agricultural lands and at the age of 62, he owned more than 150 acres of land, in which he cultivated various crops like banana, pineapple, pepper, vanilla, coconut etc. in innovative way. He died on 16 October 2020.

== Pineapple king ==
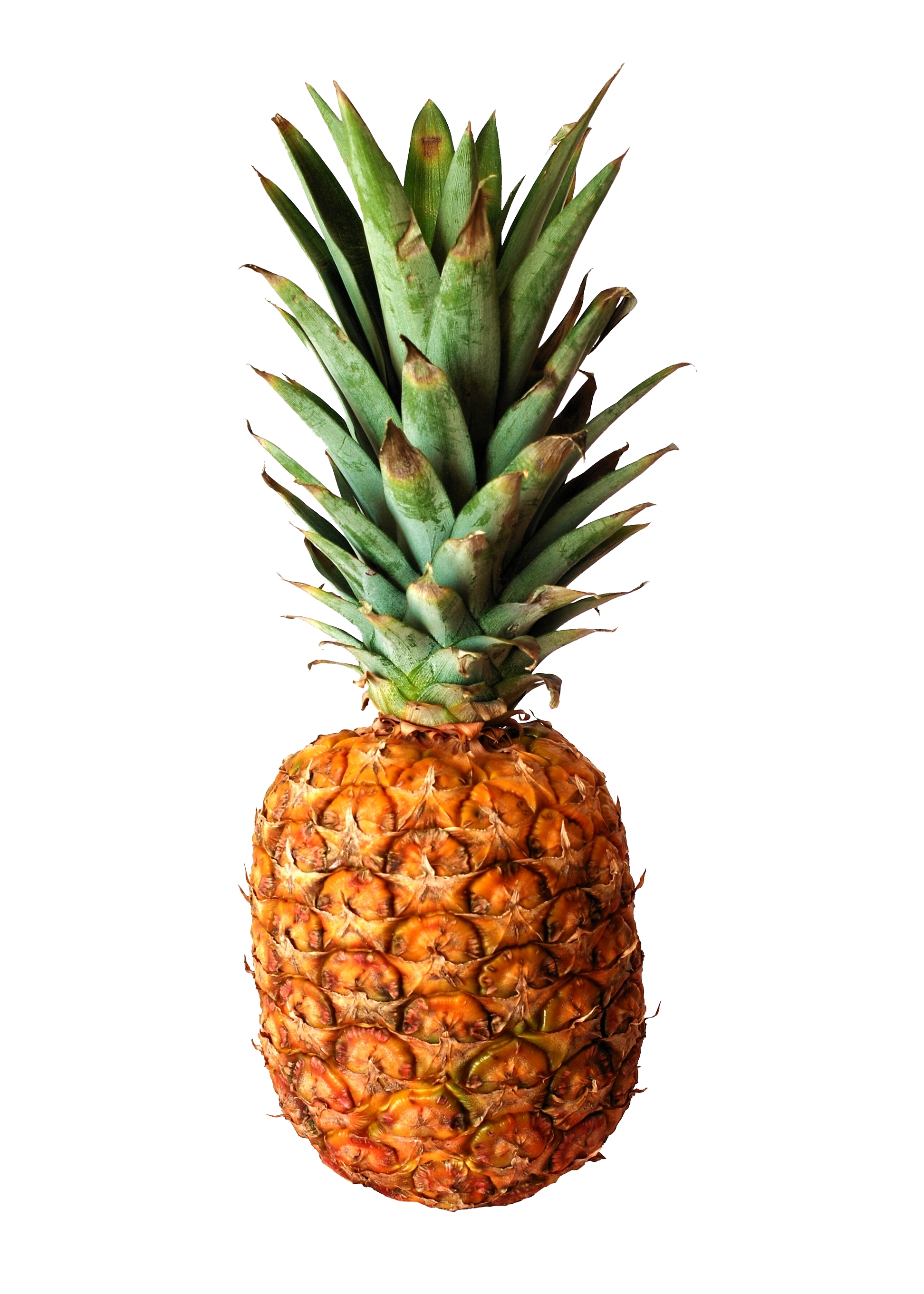
Crop that brought fame to Mr.Shaikh

Mr. Shaikh is nicknamed as Pineapple king of Banavasi, for his innovative cultivation methods and crop yield in and around Banavasi town of Uttara Kannada district of Karnataka. He adopted the method of drip irrigation for pineapple and fertilizer is supplied through drip tubes and harvested about 30 tonnes of pineapple per acre through this method. He got inspiration to adopt this method by horticulture practices adopted by farmers of Hawaii and Philippines. He has earned name and fame as he is the first farmer to adopt this method and achieved success in producing pineapple, which he directly sold at Bangalore, Hyderabad, Mumbai and Goa.

He bought dry land at Hallikoppa village during 1972-73 and started growing pineapple, which is the turning point in his life. He has adopted scientific methods in growing other horticultural crops like coconut, areca, pepper, g-9 banana, venilla etc. and he has grown some of the crops including pineapple as inter cultivation crop. He has also established a pineapple canning unit at Banavasi, with a capacity of 10 tonnes or 6000 fruits in eight hours.

== Honorary doctorate ==
Considering his contribution in agriculture and its importance to society, Mr. Shaikh was awarded an honorary doctorate by University of Agricultural Sciences, Dharwad, in 2006. He has also been honoured with Kayaka Ratna award and Dr M H Marigowda Best Horticultural Farmer Award.
