= John Abdo =

American health and fitness coach (died 2022)

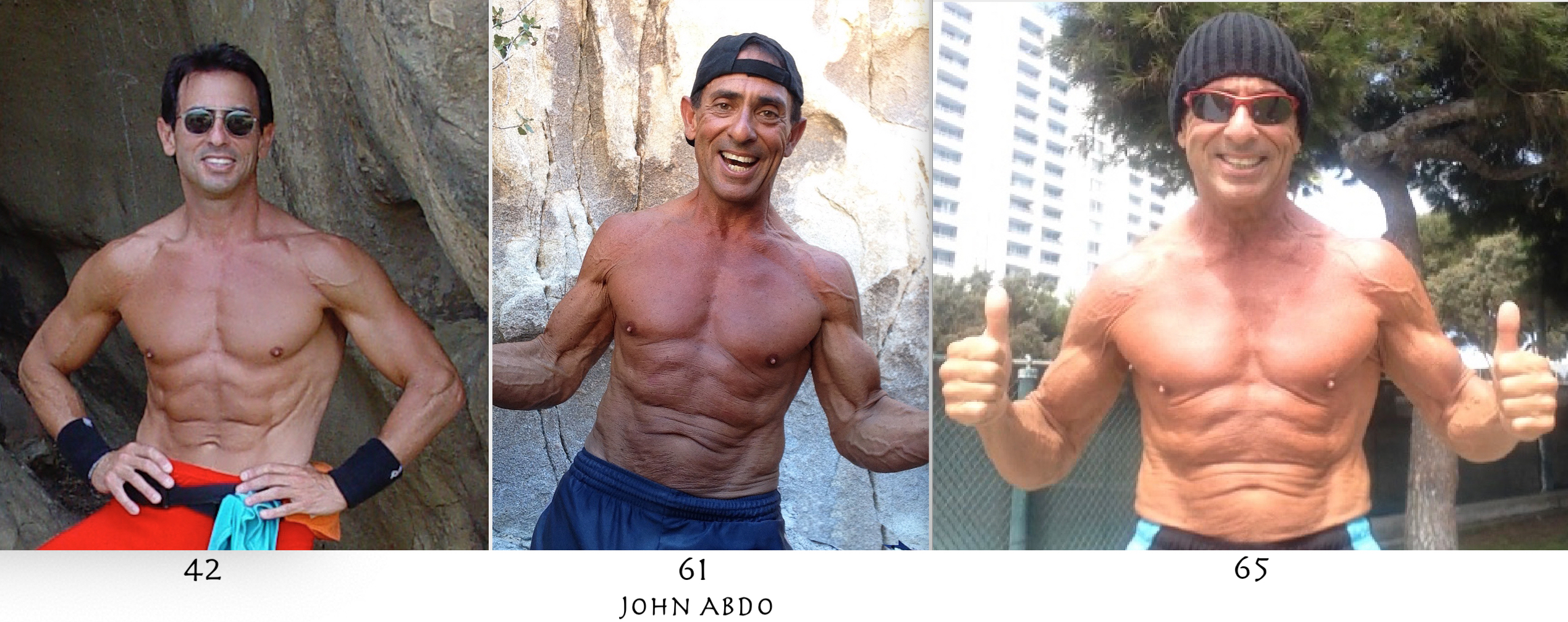
- Born: 1955 or 1956
- Died: August 9, 2022 (aged 66); Marina del Rey, California, U.S.
- Occupation(s): Health and fitness expert, businessman, nutritionist, and motivational speaker
- Awards: National Fitness Hall of Fame (2007)
- Website: www.johnabdo.com

John Abdo (1955 or 1956 – August 9, 2022) was an American health and fitness coach, businessman, nutritionist, motivational speaker and a TV personality. He was a strength and conditioning coach for numerous U.S. Olympic team athletes for the 1976, 1980, 1984, and 1988 Olympic Games. Abdo was inducted into the National Fitness Hall of Fame in 2007 for his work in the field of health and fitness. He authored several books on fitness, motivation and health.

== Death ==
Abdo died on August 9, 2022, at the age of 66.
