= Saliba =

Saliba may refer to:

- Saliba language, an indigenous language of Eastern Colombia and Venezuela
  - Piaroa–Saliban languages
- Saliba language (Papua New Guinea)
- Saliba (name), including a list of people with the name
- Saliba Street, an old main street in Cairo, Egypt

== See also ==
- Tutor-Saliba Corporation, an American construction company
