= Tom Abdo =

American poker player (1894–1967)

Thomas Abdo
- Born: 12 April 1894
- Died: March 1967 (aged 72)
- Occupation: Poker player

Thomas Abdo (April 12, 1894 – March 1967) was a poker player inducted into the Poker Hall of Fame in 1982. He died after suffering a heart attack while playing.` According to a poker legend, after suffering the heart attack, he asked another player to count his chips and to save his seat, intending to return to the game.
