= Saliba (name) =

Family name

Origin
- Origin: Syriac–Aramaic, Arabic
- Meaning: "cross" or "crucifixion"
- Region of origin: Levant, Malta

Other names
- Variant forms: Saleeba, Salibi, Saleeby

Saliba (Arabic: صليبأ), also transliterated Saleeba, or Salibi (Arabic: الصليبي; Syriac: ܨܠܝܒܐ), also transliterated Saleeby, is a Christian family name of Arabic origin used in the Levant and Malta. The family name comes from the Syriac–Aramaic (sliba) and from the Arabic cognate صليب (salîb), meaning "cross", a reference to the crucifixion of Jesus Christ.

== Notable people ==
=== Saliba ===
- Adam Saliba, Australian rules footballer
- Antonio di Saliba, Italian painter
- David Saliba, Australian politician
- Gaby Saliba, Lebanese fashion designer
- George Saliba, professor of Arabic and Islamic science
- Ghassan Saliba, Lebanese singer and actor
- Issam Saliba, Lebanese-Canadian surgeon
- Joe Saliba, general secretary of the Nationalist Party in Malta
- John A. Saliba, Jesuit priest and professor of religious studies
- Marianne Frances Saliba, Australian politician and Member of Parliament
- Naseeb Saliba, billionaire construction and real estate mogul and global philanthropist
- Nathan Saliba, Canadian professional soccer player
- Nicky Saliba, professional football player in Malta
- Pietro de Saliba, Italian Renaissance painter
- Philip Saliba, Antiochian Orthodox Archbishop of New York and Metropolitan bishop of North America
- William Saliba, French professional footballer

=== Salibi, Saleebey and Saleeby ===
- Caleb Saleeby, Lebanese-English physician, writer, and journalist
- Dennis Saleebey, American academic
- Jacob Bar-Salibi, writer in the Syriac Orthodox Church of the 12th century
- Kamal Salibi, director of the Royal Institute for Inter-Faith Studies
- Maurice Salibi, Syrian communist politician

== See also ==
- Saliba (disambiguation)
