= Abdo Hussameddin =

Syrian politician (born 1954)

Abdo Hussameddin (Arabic: عبده حسام الدين; born 1954) is a Syrian politician and former government minister. He was aide to the oil minister from August 2009 to 7 March 2012, when he became the highest-ranking government minister to defect to the opposition from Bashar al-Assad's government.

== Life ==
After studying petroleum engineering at university, Abdo Hussameddin worked as a drilling engineer for the state-owned Syrian Oil Company. Rising through the oil and gas industry in Syria, he was appointed general manager of the State Establishment for Oil Refining in March 2009. He was appointed aide to the Oil Minister in Syria in August 2009. On 7 March 2012 he resigned his ministerial post to join the opposition to Bashar al-Assad's government, announcing his decision in a video posted on YouTube:

I, Abdo Hussameddin, deputy oil and mineral wealth minister in Syria, announce my defection from the regime, resignation from my position and withdrawal from the Ba'ath Party. I am joining the revolution of the people who reject injustice and the brutal campaign of the regime.

Abdo Hussameddin is married with four children.
