= Ali al-Sajjad =

Great-grandson of Muhammad and fourth Shia Imam (659–713)

Ali al-Sajjad عَلِيٌّ ٱلسَّجَّادُ: Sayyid al-Sajidin; Dhu al-Thafenat; Zayn al-Abidin
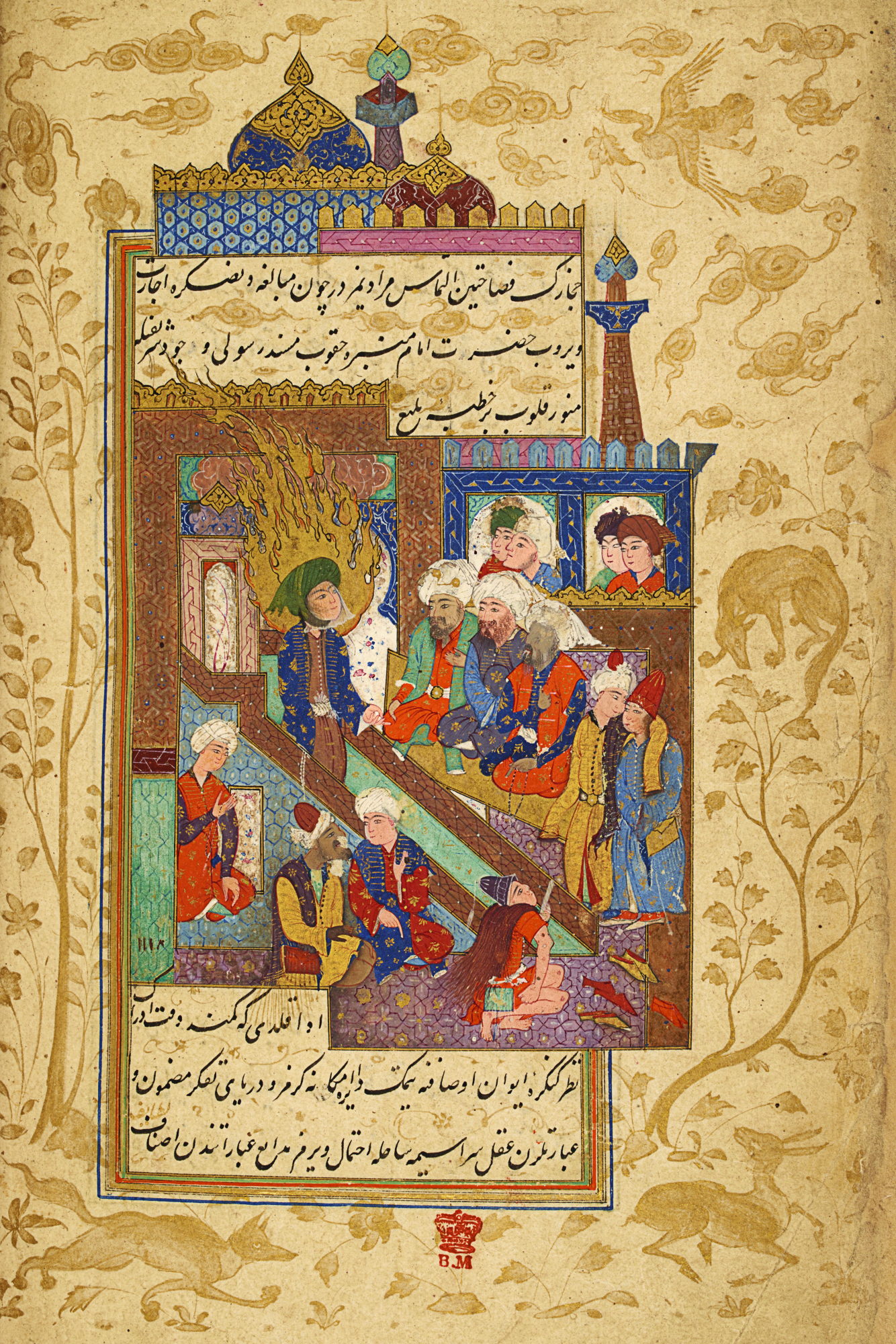
- Ali al-Sajjad in the court of Yazid I, 16th century Persian miniature.

4th Shia imam
- In office 680–712
- Preceded by: Husayn ibn Ali
- Succeeded by: Muhammad al-Baqir (Twelver Shi'ism and Isma'ilism); Hasan ibn Hasan (Zaydism)
- Title: List: Zayn al-Abidin (lit. 'ornament of the worshippers'); al-Sajjad (lit. 'the one who is constantly prostrating in worship')

Personal life
- Born: Ali ibn al-Husayn ibn Ali; 658–659 CE (c. 38 AH) Medina, Rashidun Caliphate
- Died: 712–714 CE (aged 57) (c. 94–95 AH) Medina, Umayyad Caliphate
- Resting place: Al-Baqi' Cemetery, Medina; 24°28′1″N 39°36′50.21″E
- Spouse: Fatima bint Hasan; Jayda Al-Sindhiya (concubine); Sa'eeda (concubine); Umm Ali (concubine); Umm Muhammad (concubine)
- Children: Muhammad al-Baqir ʿĀʾisha; Abdullah al-Bahir; Hasan; Husayn al-Akbar; Zayd; Umar al-Ashraf; Husayn al-Asghar; Abd al-Rahman; Sulayman; Ali al-Asghar; Khadija; Muhammad al-Asghar; Fatima; Aliyyah; Umm Kulthum
- Parents: Husayn ibn Ali; Shahrbanu

Religious life
- Religion: Islam
- Sect: Shia

Ali ibn al-Husayn al-Sajjad (Arabic: عَلِيٌّ بْنُ ٱلْحُسَيْنِ ٱلسَّجَّادُ, romanized: ʿAlī ibn al-Ḥusayn al-Sajjād, c. 658 – c. 712), also known as Zayn al-Abidin (Arabic: زَيْنُ ٱلْعَابِدِينَ, romanized: Zayn al-ʿĀbidīn) was the great-grandson of the Islamic prophet Muhammad and the fourth of the Twelve Imams, succeeding his father Husayn, his uncle Hasan, and his grandfather Ali. Born around 658 in Medina, al-Sajjad survived the Battle of Karbala in 680, in which Husayn and his small caravan were brutally massacred by the forces of the Umayyad caliph Yazid. After the battle, al-Sajjad and other survivors were treated poorly and taken to the Umayyad capital Damascus. Al-Sajjad was eventually allowed to return to his hometown of Medina, where he led a secluded life, without participating in the numerous pro-Alid uprisings against the Umayyads during the Second Fitna. Instead, he fully devoted his life to worship and learning, and was highly esteemed, even among proto-Sunnis, as a leading authority on hadith and Fiqh. He was known for his piety and virtuous character.

Being politically quiescent, al-Sajjad had few followers until late in his life, as many Shia Muslims of his time were drawn to the anti-Umayyad movement of Mukhtar al-Thaqafi. Ali al-Sajjad died around 712 in Medina, either from natural causes or having been poisoned by the Umayyads. He was succeeded by his eldest son, the equally politically quiescent Muhammad al-Baqir. Some others followed al-Baqir's much younger half-brother, Zayd, whose rebellion was crushed by the Umayyads in 740, marking the birth of Zaydism. Supplications attributed to al-Sajjad are collected in Al-Sahifa al-Sajjadiyya, which is highly regarded in Shia Islam. Ali al-Sajjad is seen by Shia Muslims as an example of patience and perseverance when numerical odds are against one. He is buried in the Baqi Cemetery in Medina. The shrine that stood over his grave was demolished, along with the cemetery itself, by Wahhabis in 1806 and again in 1925.

== Life ==
=== Birth and early life ===
Ali al-Sajjad was born in Medina, or perhaps in Kufa, in the year 38 AH (658–659). Shia Muslims annually celebrate the fifth of Sha'ban for this occasion.

Al-Sajjad was the great-grandson of Islamic prophet Muhammad, and the grandson of the first Shia imam, Ali ibn Abi Talib, by the latter's marriage with Muhammad's daughter, Fatima. After his grandfather was assassinated in 661, al-Sajjad was raised by his uncle Hasan ibn Ali and his father, Husayn ibn Ali, the second and third Shia imams, respectively. Husayn also had two other sons named Ali, both of whom were killed in the Battle of Karbala in 680. The first one was an infant, identified in Shia literature as Ali al-Asghar ibn Husayn (lit. 'Ali junior'). The second one was Ali al-Akbar ibn Husayn (lit. 'Ali senior'), although some historical accounts suggest that al-Sajjad was instead the eldest son of Husayn.

Al-Sajjad's mother is named variously in sources as Barra, Gazala, Solafa, Salama, Shahzanan, and Shahrbanu. According to Ibn Sa'd and Ibn Qutaybah, she was a freed slave girl (umm walad) from Sindh, named either Galaza or Solafa. In contrast, Shia sources, such as the 10th century Al-Kafi, maintain that al-Sajjad's mother was a daughter of Yazdegerd III (r. 632–651), the last Sasanian Emperor, who was overthrown during the Muslim conquest of Persia. Shia tradition thus refers to al-Sajjad as Ibn al-Khiyaratayn (lit. 'son of the best two'), a title that signifies his noble descent on both sides. However, the claim that al-Sajjad's mother was a Sasanian princess is specific to some Shia sources. Shia accounts add that Yazdegerd's daughter was brought to Medina as a captive during the reign of the second caliph, Umar (r. 634–644). She was then allowed to choose her husband, Husayn, and died shortly after giving birth to her only son, Ali al-Sajjad.

=== Karbala ===
On 10 Muharram 61 AH (10 October 680), Husayn and his small caravan were intercepted and massacred in Karbala, present-day Iraq, by the forces of the Umayyad Caliph Yazid I (r. 680–683), to whom Husayn had refused to pledge his allegiance. Ali al-Sajjad was also present there, in the Battle of Karbala, but was too ill to fight. After killing Husayn and his male relatives and supporters, the Umayyad troops looted his camp and some were intent on killing al-Sajjad but his life was ultimately spared.

After the battle, al-Sajjad and the women were taken prisoner and marched to the nearby Kufa. They were badly treated along the way. Once in Kufa, they were paraded in shackles, and the women unveiled, around the city, along with the heads of the fallen. The captives were then presented to the Umayyad governor Ubayd Allah ibn Ziyad, who boasted of killing Husayn and his relatives, calling it divine punishment. When al-Sajjad responded that Ibn Ziyad was a murderer, the governor ordered his execution but relented when al-Sajjad was protected by his aunt Zaynab, who asked to be killed first. Ibn Ziyad imprisoned the captives for a time and then sent them to the Umayyad capital, Damascus.

As the captives were taken to Damascus, they were displayed from village to village along the way. A letter to Yazid, attributed to Muhammad's cousin Abd Allah ibn al-Abbas, chastises the caliph for treating the captives poorly, suggesting that such treatment was worse than the massacre.

=== In Damascus ===
In Damascus, captives were paraded in the streets and then imprisoned for a while before being brought to the caliph. Yazid's reaction to, and his culpability in, the events in Karbala have been debated in medieval and modern sources alike.

The first narrative is that he treated the captives kindly after an initial, harsh interrogation, saying that he regretted the conduct of his governor, and that he would have pardoned Husayn if he were alive. Such accounts are offered by the Islamicists Laura Veccia Vaglieri, Wilferd Madelung, and Heinz Halm. In contrast, Moojan Momen, another expert, believes that Yazid, fearing social unrest, released the captives as public opinion began to sway in their favor. Similar views are expressed by some other authors, including John Esposito, R. Osman, K. Aghaie, D. Pinault, H. Munson, and the Shia scholar Muhammad Husayn Tabataba'i. In particular, the Islamicist Husain Mohammad Jafri writes that Yazid is not known to have reprimanded his governor in the wake of the massacre, which does not suggest any remorse to Jafri. At any rate, such claims of remorse are in stark contrast to Yazid's earlier orders to his governor to either exact homage from Husayn or kill him.

The alternative narrative suggests that the captives were brought to the caliph in a ceremony, who gloated over avenging his pagan relatives killed fighting Muhammad. Such accounts are given by the Islamicists Tahera Qutbuddin and R. Osman. According to some reports, Yazid also dishonored the severed head of Husayn with blows from a cane, although this last episode is sometimes attributed to Ibn Ziyad instead, in line with the Sunni tendency to exonerate the caliph of killing Husayn and blaming Ibn Ziyad. Part of the great mosque in Damascus, known as Mashhad Ali, marks where al-Sajjad was incarcerated.

The captives were eventually freed and escorted back to Medina. Their caravan may have returned via Karbala, where they halted to mourn the dead. Sunni sources report of Yazid's remorse for the massacre and that he compensated the captives for the properties plundered by his soldiers. In contrast, Shia authorities contend that it was the captives' activism that compelled the caliph to eventually distance himself from the massacre. Similar views have been expressed by some contemporary authors.

=== Later life ===
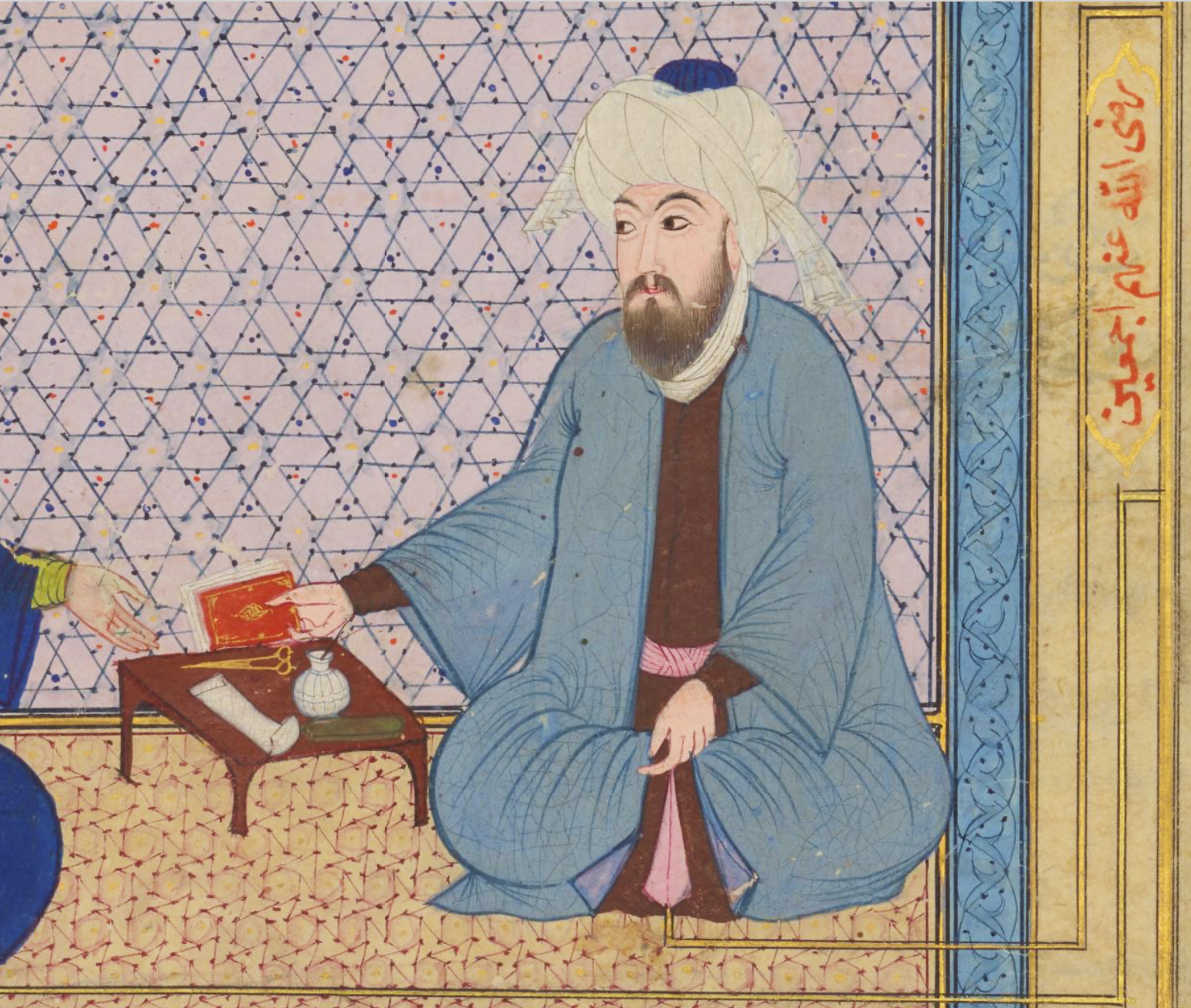
16th-century Ottoman depiction of an unarmed Ali al-Sajjad with writing implements

Ali al-Sajjad led a quiet and scholarly life after returning to Medina, confining himself to a small circle of followers and disciples. He kept aloof from politics and dedicated his time to prayer, which earned him his honorifics.

For many years, al-Sajjad commemorated the Karbala massacre in private gatherings, fearing the Umayyads' wrath. Such gatherings were a form of protest against the Umayyad regime, and the precursor of Shia Muharram rituals. Personally, al-Sajjad was deeply affected by the Karbala massacre, to the point that for many years he frequently wept over it. He justified his prolonged grief with a reference to the Quranic verse 12:84, which describes the immense grief of Jacob during the absence of his son Joseph.

==== Role in the Second Fitna ====
After the Karbala massacre, Abd Allah ibn al-Zubayr, the son of Zubayr ibn al-Awwam, who was a prominent companion of Muhammad, declared himself caliph in the Hejaz. He gradually gained popular support, to the extent that in 683 the Kufans forcibly replaced their Umayyad governor with a representative of Ibn Zubayr. Ali al-Sajjad remained neutral towards Ibn Zubayr, even leaving town during the unrest in Medina, and never pledging allegiance to Ibn Zubayr, but being left unharmed by him. Ali al-Sajjad was also not harmed by Yazid's forces, who later pillaged Medina after their victory at the Battle of al-Harra in 683. On this occasion, al-Sajjad, unlike others, was exempted from a renewed oath of allegiance to Yazid, perhaps because he had earlier sheltered the Umayyad Marwan ibn al-Hakam and his family. Some non-Shia sources describe a friendly relationship between al-Sajjad and Marwan, who in 684 succeeded Yazid's sickly son in the caliphate. Such sources even allege that al-Sajjad borrowed from Marwan to buy a concubine or that he was consulted by him about a message from the Byzantine emperor. In contrast, Shia sources contend that al-Sajjad interacted with authorities under the principle of religious dissimulation (taqiyya) to avoid persecution.

In the wake of the Karbala massacre, the Tawwabins (lit. 'penitents') in Kufa were the first to seek revenge. They revolted to atone for having deserted Husayn, meaning to deliver the caliphate to his son, al-Sajjad; but they were crushed in 684 by a much larger Umayyad army. There is no evidence that al-Sajjad was involved in this uprising.

Shortly after Yazid's death in 683, Mukhtar al-Thaqafi appeared in Kufa, where he campaigned to avenge Husayn, while claiming to represent Muhammad ibn al-Hanafiyya, who was a son of Ali ibn Abi Talib, but not from the latter's marriage to Fatima. By some accounts, Mukhtar initially sought the support of al-Sajjad, who refused. Mukhtar's campaign in Kufa was nevertheless successful, and he seized control of the city in 686, whereupon he killed some of those thought to be responsible for the Karbala massacre, including Shimr, Ibn Sa'd, and Ibn Ziyad. Mukhtar may have even made a gift of Ibn Sa'd's head to al-Sajjad. When Mukhtar was himself killed by Ibn Zubayr's forces in 687, they did not harm al-Sajjad, which suggests that al-Sajjad had only weak ties to Mukhtar. Sources are contradictory as to what al-Sajjad thought of Mukhtar, although Shia sources are largely unsympathetic towards Mukhtar, in part because he championed Ibn al-Hanafiyya rather than al-Sajjad. Similarly, al-Sajjad was not harmed by the Umayyad commander Al-Hajjaj ibn Yusuf, who defeated and killed Ibn Zubayr in 692.

== Death ==
Ali al-Sajjad died in 94 or 95 AH (712–714) and was buried next to his uncle Hasan in the al-Baqi cemetery in Medina. Shia Muslims annually commemorate this occasion on the eleventh of Safar. A shrine stood over his grave until its demolition in 1806; and then, after reconstruction, it was demolished again in 1925 or 1926, both demolitions being carried out by the adherents of Wahhabism, a revivalist Saudi-backed movement that considers the veneration of Muslim saints a form of polytheism and a grave sin.(shirk).

Ali al-Sajjad either died from natural causes, or, as reported by Shia authorities, he was poisoned at the instigation of the reigning Umayyad caliph al-Walid (r. 705–715) or perhaps his brother Hisham ibn Abd al-Malik (r. 724–743).

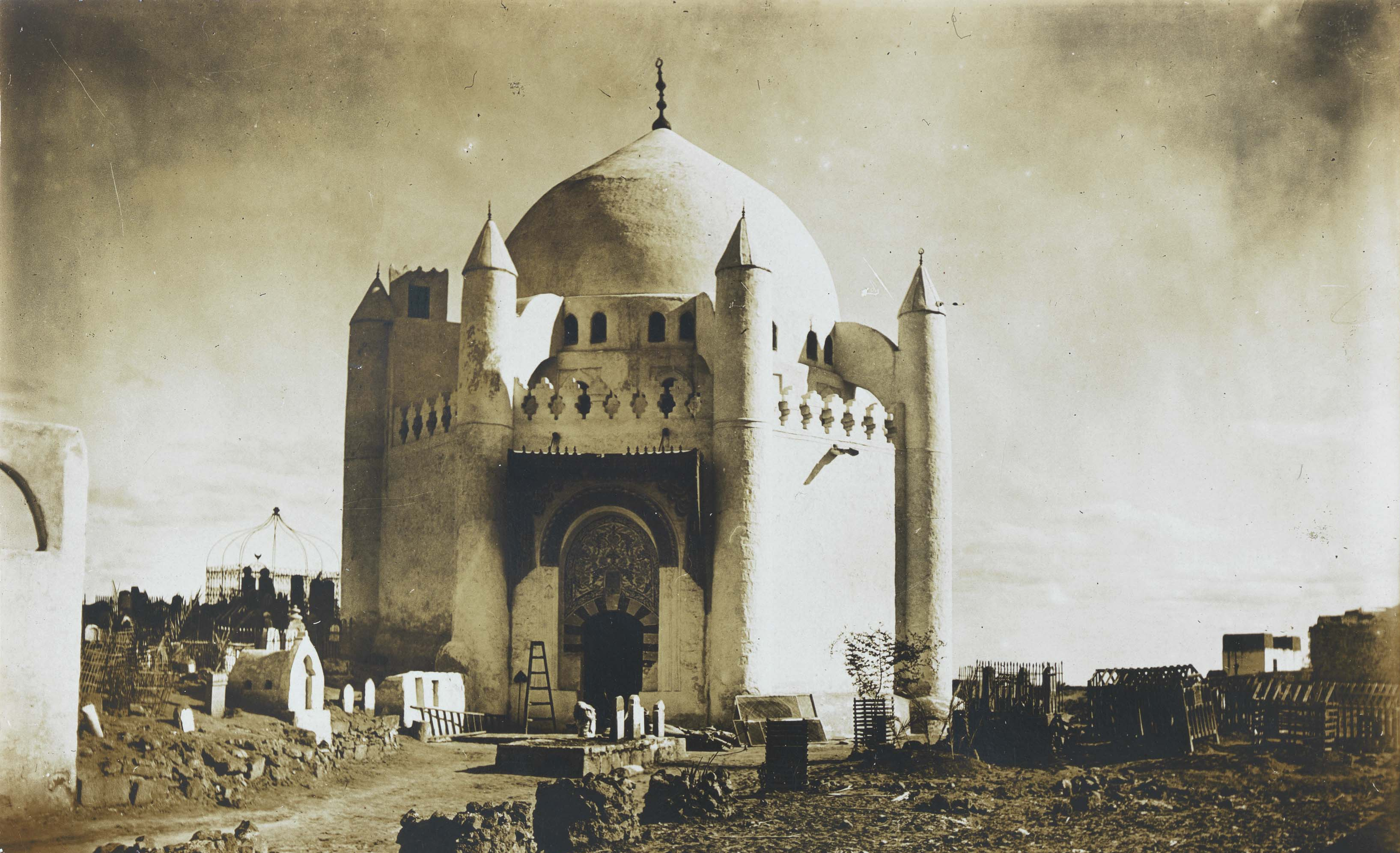
The historical tomb of al-Baqi was destroyed in 1926 during and by Wahhabi movement in Saudi Arabia.

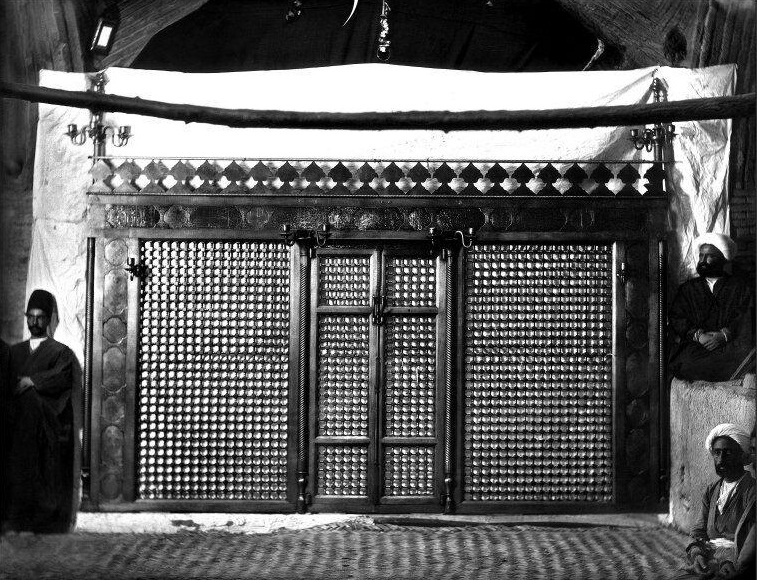
Now-destroyed zarih formerly covering the grave of his grave in the Mausoleum of Shia Imams

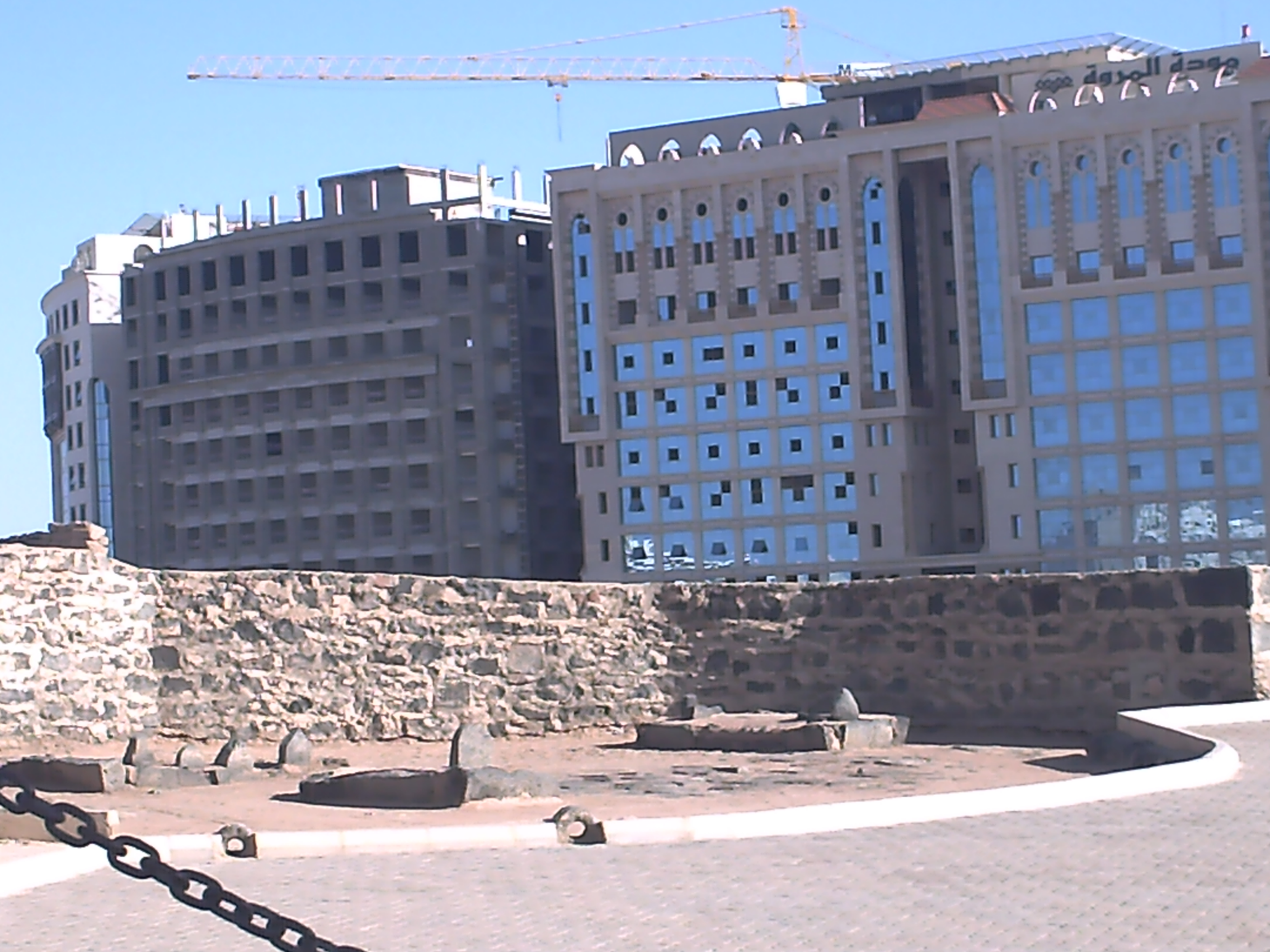
The imam's destroyed gravesite in the al-Baqi Cemetery in the present

== Imamate ==
=== Succession to Husayn ===
Zayn al-Abidin calligraphy at the Prophet's Mosque in Medina.

Today, most Shias believe that Husayn was succeeded by al-Sajjad, whose imamate coincided with the caliphates of Yazid (r. 680–683), Mu'awiya II (r. 683–684), Marwan I (r. 684–685), Abd al-Malik ibn Marwan (r. 685–705), and al-Walid I (r. 705–715).

As the only surviving son of Husayn, al-Sajjad was the natural candidate for the imamate. There are also some Shia traditions to the effect that Husayn had designated al-Sajjad as his heir and successor. At the time, however, many Shias felt that, like Husayn, their imam should rise against the tyranny of the Umayyads. Given the quiescent attitude of al-Sajjad, these Shias rallied behind Mukhtar, who revolted in support of Ibn al-Hanafiyya. The latter thus initially diverted much support away from al-Sajjad, who led a secluded, pious life after Karbala. Indeed, even though al-Sajjad was widely respected, he had few followers until the collapse of the Zubayrid counter-caliphate in 692. Such was his quiescent attitude that some Western historians are uncertain whether he put forward any claims to imamate. Yet some contemporary Shia figures, including Abu Khalid al-Kabuli and Qasim ibn Awf, are known to have switched their allegiance to al-Sajjad from Ibn al-Hanafiyya.

For his part, Ibn al-Hanafiyya remained in his hometown of Medina and declined active leadership of Mukhtar's uprising. Ibn al-Hanafiyya neither repudiated Mukhtar's propaganda in his own favor nor made any public claims about succession to Husayn. On the other hand, perhaps Ibn al-Hanafiyya had secret designs for the caliphate, because he never pledged allegiance to Ibn Zubayr, who even imprisoned him until he was rescued by Mukhtar. Ibn al-Hanafiyya's followers among the Shia became known as the Kasaniyya, who continued to trace the imamate through his descendants. Some Kaysanites apparently joined al-Sajjad when Ibn al-Hanafiyya died in 700 or 701. Some others thought that he was concealed by divine will and would eventually return to eradicate injustice on Earth. This was perhaps when the messianic concept of the Mahdi became mainstream in Shia Islam. Most Kaysanites, however, followed Ibn al-Hanafiyya's son, Abd Allah ibn Muhammad ibn al-Hanafiyya. When the latter died, his imamate supposedly passed on to the Abbasids, that is, descendants of Muhammad's uncle, Al-Abbas ibn Abd al-Muttalib. Kaysanites later proved instrumental in the Abbasids' overthrow of the Umayyads. As the Abbasids gradually turned against their former Shia allies, they carried most Kaysanites with themselves toward Sunnism.

Among other Shia sects, the Isma'ilis believe that Husayn had designated Ibn al-Hanafiyya as a temporary imam to protect the identity of the true imam, that is, al-Sajjad. Most Zaydis, by contrast, do not count al-Sajjad among their imams, for his political quietism disqualifies him from Zaydi imamate.

=== Successor ===
When al-Sajjad died, most of his followers accepted the imamate of his eldest son Muhammad al-Baqir, who is often known by the honorific al-Baqir (lit. 'the one who brings knowledge to light'). Indeed, popular Shia sources report that, before his death, al-Sajjad designated al-Baqir as his successor.

Zayd ibn Ali, a much younger half-brother of Muhammad al-Baqir, also asserted a claim to leadership. Unlike the quiescent al-Baqir, Zayd was politically active. He revolted against the Umayyads in 740 but was soon killed. Perhaps to widen his support, Zayd accommodated some majority views that were not espoused by the early Shia. For instance, he did not condemn the first two caliphs, namely, Abu Bakr and Umar, who are denounced in Shia Islam as usurpers of Ali ibn Abi Talib's right to the caliphate. Such views, however, cost Zayd part of his support among Shias. Zayd's rebellion marks the beginning of the Zaydi (Shia) movement. Especially for early Zaydis, any (religiously) learned descendant of Ali ibn Abi Talib and Fatima qualified for leadership as long as he rose against the unjust government.

=== Miracles ===
Shia sources attribute some miracles to al-Sajjad: He spoke to a gazelle in the desert, restored youth to an old woman, and the sacred Black Stone in Mecca attested to his imamate in the presence of Ibn al-Hanafiyya.

== Titles and epithets ==
Ali's teknonym (kunya) is reported variously as Abu al-Hasan, Abu al-Husayn, Abu Muhammad, Abu Bakr, and Abu Abd Allah. A reference to his devotion to worship, Ali's honorific title is Zayn al-Abidin (lit. 'ornament of worshipers'), by which he was already known during his lifetime. His other titles are al-Sajjad (lit. 'the one who is constantly prostrating in worship') and al-Zaki (lit. 'the pure one'). He was also known as Dhu al-Thafenat, meaning "he who has calluses" from frequent prostration in worship.

== Character ==
Ali al-Sajjad was thin and resembled his grandfather, Ali ibn Abi Talib, both in appearance and demeanor. He spent much of his time in worship and learning, to the point that his face was bruised and his legs were swollen from lengthy prayers, according to his Shia biographer. He was also a leading authority on Islamic tradition (hadith) and law (fiqh), and was well known for his virtuous character and piety. For all these reasons, Muhammad's great-grandson was highly esteemed, even among non-Shia Muslims. This was particularly the case within the learned circles of Medina, such that among his associates and admirers were some top Sunni scholars of the time, including Ibn Shihab al-Zuhri and Said ibn al-Musayyib. These and some other hadith scholars have copied from al-Sajjad in Sunni sources. A poem praising al-Sajjad, attributed to the renowned poet al-Farazdaq, describes the ire of Hisham, prior to his caliphate, when crowds showed more respect to al-Sajjad than to Hisham during a hajj pilgrimage.

There are also numerous stories about the generosity of al-Sajjad in Shia sources. He bought and freed dozens of slaves in his lifetime, and secretly provided for destitute Medinans, who discovered, after his death, that al-Sajjad was the benefactor who regularly brought them food at night, while covering his face to preserve his anonymity. Among the stories about his forbearance and magnanimity, he is said to have sheltered Marwan's family during the anti-Umayyad revolt in Medina. Ali al-Sajjad also prevented ill-treatment of Hisham ibn Isma'il al-Makhzumi when the latter was dismissed as the governor of Medina, even though Hisham had regularly insulted al-Sajjad. Ali al-Sajjad is seen by the Shia community as an example of patience and perseverance against numerically superior odds.

== Family ==
Ali al-Sajjad had between eight and fifteen children, perhaps eleven boys and four girls. Four of his sons were born to Fatima bint Hasan and the rest were from concubines. Among his sons were Zayd and Abd Allah, and the eldest of them was Muhammad al-Baqir.

== Companions and narrators ==
Even though he was widely respected, al-Sajjad had few supporters until the collapse of the Zubayrid counter-caliphate in 692. Shia authors have listed 168 to 237 companions and narrators for al-Sajjad, some of whom believed in his infallibility (ismah). Some senior associates of al-Sajjad were among the companions of Muhammad and Ali ibn Abi Talib, such as Jabir ibn Abd Allah, Amir ibn Wathila al-Kinani, and Salama ibn Kahil. Among other notable companions of al-Sajjad were Abu Hamza al-Thumali, Aban ibn Taghlib, Abu Khalid al-Kabuli, Yahya ibn Umm Tawil, Sa'id ibn Jubayr, Sa'id ibn al-Musayyib, Muhammad and Hakim ibn Jubair ibn Mut'am, and Humran ibn Muhammad ibn Abd Allah al-Tayyar. Transmitters of hadith from al-Sajjad include Aban ibn Taghlib, Abu Hamza al-Thumali, Thabit ibn Hormuz Haddad, Amru ibn Thabit, and Salim ibn Abi Hafsa.

== Works ==
=== Al-Sahifa al-sajjadiyya ===
Al-Sahifa al-Sajjadiyya (lit. 'the scripture of al-Sajjad') is the oldest collection of Islamic prayers. Shia tradition regards this book with great respect, ranking it behind only the Quran and Nahj al-balagha, which is attributed to Ali ibn Abi Talib. Fifty-four supplications form the core of the book, which also includes an addenda of fourteen supplications and another Fifteen Whispered Prayers. The book, attributed to al-Sajjad, is often regarded as authentic by Shia scholars of hadith, although its whispered prayers (munajat) may have been artistically edited by others.

Regarded as a seminal work in Islamic spirituality, al-Sahifa is also a rich source of Islamic teachings. Its prayer "Blessing Upon the Bearers of the Throne", for instance, summarizes the Islamic views about angels. The book was translated into Persian during the Safavid era; and its English translation, entitled The Psalms of Islam, is available with an introduction and annotations by the Islamicist W. Chittick. Numerous commentaries have been written about al-Sahifa.

=== Supplication of Abu Hamza al-Thumali ===
This supplication (du'a') is attributed to al-Sajjad and is transmitted by his companion Abu Hamza al-Thumali.

=== Risalat al-Hoquq ===
The right of charity (sadaqa) is that you know it is a storing away with your Lord and a deposit for which you will have no need for witnesses. If you deposit it in secret, you will be more confident of it than if you deposit it in public. You should know that it repels afflictions and illnesses from you in this world and it will repel the Fire from you in the next world.

— Ali al-Sajjad

Risalat al-Huquq (lit. 'treatise on rights') is attributed to al-Sajjad; it was written at the request of a disciple. Available in two recensions, this book is concerned with social and religious responsibilities. It exhaustively describes the rights God bestows upon humans and the rights humans should give themselves and each other, as perceived in Islam. The book describes the social duties each human must observe, and that those are predicated on more fundamental duties, such as faith in God and obedience to Him.

== See also ==
- Ahl al-Bayt
- Muhammad al-Baqir
- Zayd ibn Ali
- Twelver Shia holy days

== Bibliography ==
- Abu Zahra, N. (1997). The Pure and Powerful - Studies in Contemporary Muslim Society. Ithaca Press. ISBN 0863722695.
- Aghaie, K. S. (2004a). "Ta'ziya (Ta'ziyeh)". In Martin, R. C. (ed.). Encyclopedia of Islam and the Muslim World. Vol. 2. Macmillan Reference USA. p. 691. ISBN 0028656059.
- Aghaie, K. S. (2004b). The Martyrs of Karbala - Shi'i Symbols and Rituals in Modern Iran. University of Washington Press. ISBN 0295984481.
- Amir-Moezzi, M. A.; Jambet, C. (2018). What is Shi'i Islam - An Introduction. Translated by Casler, K.; Ormsby, E. Routledge. ISBN 9781138093737.
- Ayoub, M. M. (1978). Redemptive Suffering in Islam - A Study of the Devotional Aspects of Ashura in Twelver Shi'ism. De Gruyter. ISBN 9789027979438.
- Baghestani, I.; Emadi Haeri, M. (2017). "سجاد, امام" [Sajjad, Imam]. Encyclopaedia of the World of Islam (in Persian). Vol. 23.
- Boyce, Mary (1967). "Bībī Shahrbānū and the Lady of Pārs". Bulletin of the School of Oriental and African Studies, University of London. 30 (1): 30–44. doi:10.1017/S0041977X00099080. ISSN 0041-977X. JSTOR 611813. S2CID 162849583.
- Buhl, Fr. (1993). "Muḥammad Ibn al-Ḥanafiyya". In Bosworth, C. E.; van Donzel, E.; Heinrichs, W. P. & Pellat, Ch. (eds.). The Encyclopaedia of Islam, Second Edition. Volume VII: Mif–Naz. Leiden: E. J. Brill. pp. 402–403. ISBN 978-90-04-09419-2.
- Chittick, W. C. (1987). "Translator's Introduction". The Psalms of Islam (As-sahifa Al-kamilah Al-sajjadiyya). The Muhammadi Trust of Great Britain and Northern Ireland. ISBN 094607951X.
- Crone, P.; Hinds, M. (2003). God's Caliph - Religious Authority in the First Centuries of Islam. Cambridge University Press. ISBN 0521541115.
- Crone, P. (2005). Medieval Islamic Political Thought. Edinburgh University Press. ISBN 0748621946.
- Daftary, F. (2013). A History of Shi'i Islam. I.B. Tauris. ISBN 9780857723338.
- Daftary, F. (2015). "Shi'i Communities in History". In Daftary, F.; Sajoo, A. B.; Jiwa, S. (eds.). The Shi'i World - Pathways in Tradition and Modernity. I.B. Tauris. pp. 169–209. ISBN 9781784534776.
- Dakake, M. M. (2007). The Charismatic Community - Shi'ite Identity in Early Islam. State University of New York Press. ISBN 9780791470336.
- Donaldson, D. M. (1933). The Shi'ite Religion - A History of Islam in Persia and Irak. Luzac and Company. OCLC 1391736058.
- Esposito, J. L. (2003). The Oxford Dictionary of Islam. Oxford University Press. ISBN 0195125584.
- Esposito, J. L., ed. (2022). "Zaynab". The Islamic World - Past and Present. Oxford Reference. Oxford University Press. ISBN 9780197669471.
- Gordon Melton, J. (2010). "Ashura". In Gordon Melton, J.; Baumann, M. (eds.). Religions of the World - A Comprehensive Encyclopedia of Beliefs and Practices (Second ed.). ABC-Clio. pp. 210–212. ISBN 9781598842043.
- Haider, N. (2014). Shi'i Islam - An Introduction. Cambridge University Press. ISBN 9781107031432.
- Halm, H. (1999). Shi'a Islam - From Religion to Revolution. Markus Wiener Publishers. ISBN 1558761349.
- Hamdar, A. (2009). "Jihad of Words - Gender and Contemporary Karbala Narratives". The Yearbook of English Studies. 39 (1): 84–100. doi:10.1353/yes.2009.0016. S2CID 158479476.
- Hawting, G.R. (2000). The First Dynasty of Islam - The Umayyad Caliphate 661–750 (Second ed.). Routledge. ISBN 0415240735.
- Hussain, A. J. (2005). "The Mourning of History and the History of Mourning - The Evolution of Ritual Commemoration of the Battle of Karbala". Comparative Studies of South Asia, Africa and the Middle East. 25 (1): 78–88. doi:10.1215/1089201X-25-1-78. S2CID 143516655.
- Hyder, S. A. (2006). Reliving Karbala - Martyrdom in South Asian Memory. Oxford University Press. ISBN 9780195373028.
- Ibrahim, F. (2006). The Shi'is of Saudi Arabia. Saqi. ISBN 9780863569036.
- Jafri, S. H. M. (1979). Origins and Early Development of Shi'a Islam. Longman. ISBN 0582780802.
- Kennedy, H. (2016). The Prophet and the Age of the Caliphates - The Islamic Near East from the Sixth to the Eleventh Century (Third ed.). Routledge. ISBN 9781138787612.
- Kohlberg, E. (1995). "al-Rāfiḍa". In Bosworth, C. E.; van Donzel, E.; Heinrichs, W. P. & Lecomte, G. (eds.). The Encyclopaedia of Islam, Second Edition. Volume VIII: Ned–Sam. Leiden: E. J. Brill. pp. 386–389. ISBN 978-90-04-09834-3.
- Kohlberg, E. (2002). "Zayn al-'Ābidīn". In Bearman, P. J.; Bianquis, Th.; Bosworth, C. E.; van Donzel, E. & Heinrichs, W. P. (eds.). The Encyclopaedia of Islam, Second Edition. Volume XI: W–Z. Leiden: E. J. Brill. pp. 481–483. ISBN 978-90-04-12756-2.
- Lalani, A. R. (2000). Early Shī'ī Thought - The Teachings of Imam Muḥammad al-Bāqir. I.B. Tauris. ISBN 1850435928.
- Madelung, W. (1985). "'Alī b. Ḥosayn b. 'Alī b. Abī Ṭāleb". Encyclopaedia Iranica. Vol. I/8. pp. 849–850. ISSN 2330-4804.
- Madelung, W. (2004). "Ḥosayn b. 'Ali i. Life and Significance in Shi'ism". Encyclopaedia Iranica. Vol. XII/5. pp. 493–498. ISSN 2330-4804.
- Madelung, W. (2002). "Zayd b. 'Alī b. al-Ḥusayn". In Bearman, P. J.; Bianquis, Th.; Bosworth, C. E.; van Donzel, E. & Heinrichs, W. P. (eds.). The Encyclopaedia of Islam, Second Edition. Volume XI: W–Z. Leiden: E. J. Brill. pp. 473–474. ISBN 978-90-04-12756-2.
- Mavani, H. (2013). Religious Authority and Political Thought in Twelver Shi'ism - From Ali to Post-Khomeini. Routledge. ISBN 9780203694282.
- Momen, M. (1985). An Introduction to Shi'i Islam. Yale University Press. ISBN 9780300035315.
- Munson, H. (1988). Islam and Revolution in the Middle East. Yale University Press. ISBN 0300041276.
- Osman, R. (2015). Female Personalities in the Qur'an and Sunna - Examining the Major Sources of Imami Shi'i Islam. Routledge. ISBN 9781315770147.
- Pierce, M. (2016). Twelve Infallible Men - The Imams and the Making of Shi'ism. Harvard University Press. ISBN 9780674737075.
- Pinault, D. (1998). "Zaynab bint 'Alī and the Place of the Women of the Households of the First Imāms in Shī'īte Devotional Literature". In Hambly, G. (ed.). Women in the Medieval Islamic World - Power, Patronage, and Piety. Palgrave Macmillan. pp. 69–98. ISBN 9780333740965.
- Pinault, D. (2001). Horse of Karbala - Muslim Devotional Life in India. Palgrave Macmillan. ISBN 0312216378.
- Qutbuddin, T. (2005). "Zaynab bint 'Alī". In Jones, L. (ed.). Encyclopedia of Religion. Vol. 14 (Second ed.). Macmillan Reference USA. pp. 9937–9939. ISBN 002865983X.
- Qutbuddin, T. (2019). "Orations of Zaynab and Umm Kulthūm in the Aftermath of Ḥusayn's Martyrdom at Karbala - Speaking Truth to Power". In Korangy, A.; Rouhi, L. (eds.). The "Other" Martyrs - Women and the Poetics of Sexuality, Sacrifice, and Death in World Literatures. Harrassowitz Verlag. pp. 103–132. ISBN 9783447112147.
- Sachedina, Abdulaziz Abdulhussein (1981). Islamic Messianism - The Idea of Mahdī in Twelver Shī'ism. SUNY Press. ISBN 978-0873954426.
- Sachedina, A. A. (1988). The Just Ruler in Shi'ite Islam - The Comprehensive Authority of the Jurist in Imamite Jurisprudence. Oxford University Press. ISBN 0195119150.
- Tabatabai, S. M. H. (1975). Nasr, S. H. (ed.). Shi'ite Islam. State University of New York Press. ISBN 0873953908.
- Veccia Vaglieri, L. (1971). "(al-)Ḥusayn b. 'Alī b. Abī Ṭālib". In Lewis, B.; Ménage, V. L.; Pellat, Ch. & Schacht, J. (eds.). The Encyclopaedia of Islam, Second Edition. Volume III: H–Iram. Leiden: E. J. Brill. pp. 607–615. OCLC 495469525.
- Werner, E. (2010). "Baqī' al-Gharqad". In Fleet, K.; Krämer, G.; Matringe, D.; Nawas, J.; Stewart, D. J. (eds.). Encyclopaedia of Islam (Third ed.). doi:10.1163/1875-9831_isla_SIM_00000066. ISBN 9789004183902. S2CID 240012569.
- "Al-Kafi". thaqalayn.net.

Ali al-Sajjad of the Ahl al-Bayt Banu Hashim Clan of the Quraysh Born: 5th Sha'bān 38 AH ≈ 657 Died: 25th Muharram 95 AH ≈ 713
Shia Islam titles
Preceded by Husayn ibn Ali	4th Imam of Shia Islam; 680 – 713	Succeeded by Muhammad al-Baqir (Twelver Shi'ism and Isma'ilism)
