= Abdo Hakim =

Lebanese actor and voice actor (born 1973)

Abdo El Hakim
- عبدو حكيم
- Born: August 29, 1973 (age 53); Dahye, Mount Lebanon Governorate, Lebanon
- Occupations: Writer, Director Actor, voice actor
- Children: Omar; Ghady; Clara
- Website: abdohakim.com

Abdo Hakim (Arabic: عبدو حكيم Lebanese)is a Lebanese actor and voice actor.

== Filmography ==
=== Film ===
- Warshots. 1996

=== Television ===
Year	Title	Role	Notes	Sources
2007	Aayle A Fared Mayle			
2012	Hotel Al Afrah	Akram		
2015	Darb Al-Yasamin			
2016	Mesh Ana			Adham beik

=== Plays ===
- All of it by Head. 2013

=== Dubbing roles ===
- Adventure Time - Finn the Human (the third season and beyond)
- Baby Looney Tunes - Floyd Minton
- Bakugan: Mechtanium Surge - Dan Kuso
- The Basketeers - Rudy Targui
- Ben 10: Alien Force - Ben Tennyson, Albedo, Big Chill, Spidermonkey
- Ben 10: Ultimate Alien - Ben Tennyson, Omnitrix, Albedo, Big Chill, Spidermonkey, Fasttrack, Jury Rigg, Goop
- Ben 10/Generator Rex: Heroes United - Ben Tennyson
- Ben 10: Omniverse - Ben Tennyson
- Codename: Kids Next Door - Numbuh Two (Image Production House version)
- Contraplus - Basile Landouye
- Courage the Cowardly Dog - Courage
- Dave the Barbarian - The Dark Lord Chuckles the Silly Piggy
- Dexter's Laboratory - Mandark
- Ed, Edd n Eddy - Jonny, Rolf
- Extreme Football - Samy
- Fillmore! - Joseph Anza
- Foster's Home for Imaginary Friends - Wilt
- The Grim Adventures of Billy & Mandy - Billy
- The Jetsons - Elroy Jetson
- Kim Possible - Felix Renton, Prince Wally
- The Marvelous Misadventures of Flapjack - Flapjack
- Mokhtarnameh
- Over the Garden Wall - Wirt
- Pac-Man and the Ghostly Adventures - Spiralton (first voice)
- Pokémon : James (the third season and beyond), Max
- Prophet Joseph - Young Mimisaboo (uncredited)
- Puppy in My Pocket: Adventures in Pocketville - Magic

- Rekkit Rabbit - Jay Shmufton
- The Smurfs - Clumsy Smurf (Image Production House version)
- Teen Titans - Beast Boy
- Teen Titans Go! - Beast Boy
- Teletubbies - Tinky-Winky, Dipsy
- Yu-Gi-Oh! Duel Monsters - Yugi Mutou, Yami Yugi
- Yu-Gi-Oh! GX - Chazz Princeton
