= Geneive Abdo =

Lebanese journalist (born 1960)

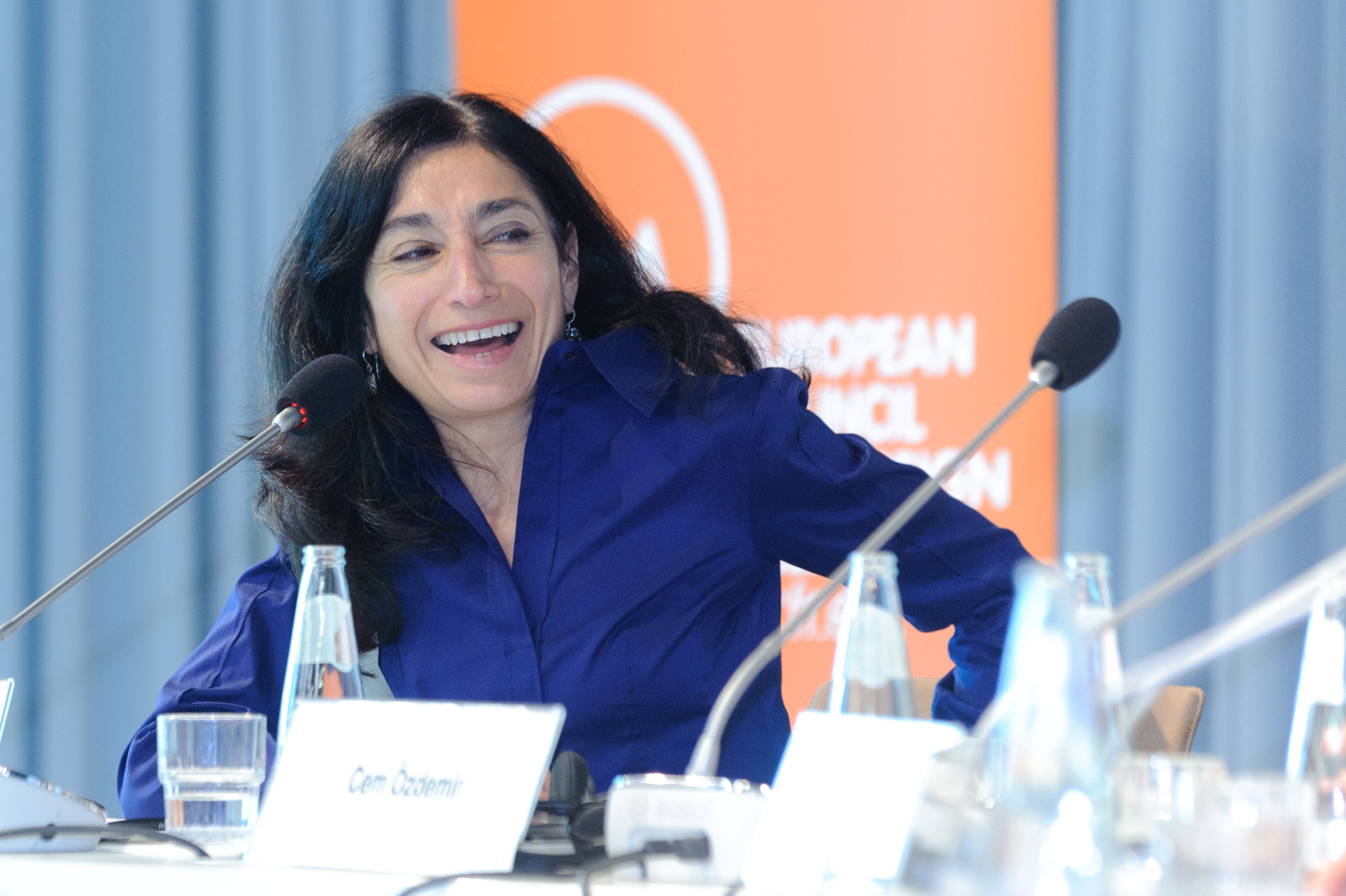
- Geneive Abdo (2011)
- Born: 1960 (age 65–66)
- Writing career
- Genre: non-fiction
- Notable awards: Simon Guggenheim Fellowship, Nieman Fellowship

Geneive Abdo (born 1960) is an American scholar and author of several books on the Middle East and the Islamic world. She was previously a senior fellow at the Atlantic Council, a nonresident fellow in the Brookings Institution at Brookings Institution and a fellow in the Middle East program at the Stimson Center think tank. In 2017 Abdo released her latest book The New Sectarianism: The Arab Uprisings and the Rebirth of the Shi'a--Sunni Divide.

== Career ==
Abdo was a visiting fellow at the Brookings Doha Center, where she specializes in Iraq, Iran, and Shia- Sunni relations. Her current research focuses on the shifting political and religious alliances within Shia communities in the Middle East.

Abdo previously worked at the United Nations Alliance of Civilizations, a project created under former UN Secretary General Kofi Annan to defuse tension between Western and Islamic societies. From 2001 to 2002, Abdo was a Nieman Fellow at Harvard University and received the John Simon Guggenheim award. From 1998 to 2001, Abdo was the Iran correspondent for the British newspaper The Guardian and a regular contributor to The Economist and the International Herald Tribune. She was the first American journalist to be based in Iran since the 1979 Islamic Revolution.

Abdo is the author of No God But God: Egypt and the Triumph of Islam (2000), Mecca and Main Street: Muslim Life in America After 9/11, (2006), the monograph The New Sectarianism (Saban Center for Middle East Policy, 2013), and co-author of Answering Only to God: Faith and Freedom in Twenty-First Century Iran (2003). No God But God documents the social and political transformation of Egypt into an Islamic society and details leading figures and events responsible for giving moderate Islamists in Egypt enormous social and political power. Answering Only to God seeks to explain the theological struggle in Iran among the Shiite clerics and how it has led to political stagnation. Mecca and Main Street explores the changing identity among American Muslims as they struggle to keep true to their faith while deciding to what degree they will integrate into American society. The analysis paper The New Sectarianism, deals with Shia–Sunni relations post-Arabs uprisings.

Abdo's commentaries and essays on Islam have appeared in Foreign Affairs, Foreign Policy, The New York Times, The Washington Post, The Washington Quarterly, The New Republic, Newsweek, The Nation, The Christian Science Monitor, CNN, and Middle East Report. She has been a commentator on CNN, National Public Radio, the BBC, the NewsHour with Jim Lehrer, the Oprah Winfrey show, Al Jazeera, PBS, and other radio and television services.

She lecturers frequently at universities and think tanks in the United States, Europe and the Middle East.

== Works ==
- No God but God: Egypt and the Triumph of Islam (University of Oxford Press, 2000)
- Answering Only to God: Faith and Freedom in Twenty-First Century Iran (With Jonathan Lyons) (Henry Holt, 2003)
- Mecca and Main Street: Muslim Life in America After 9/11 (Oxford University Press, 2006)
- The New Sectarianism (Brookings Institution. Saban Center for Middle East Policy, 2013)
