= Abdi Haji Yaris =

Somali politician

Diasporas Abdi Haji Yaris
- Born: 20th-century
- Occupation: Politician

Diasporas Abdi Haji Yaris is a Somali politician who served in the Transitional Federal Parliament of Somalia during the 2000s. During his tenure, he served as assistant minister of constitutional affairs and federalism and deputy minister of business. In the latter position, Yaris was part of a committee which monitored small businesses and government tax collection.
