= Ubayd (name) =

Ubayd is an Arabic given name and surname, a variant romanization of the same name also written Ebeid, Obeid, etc.

It may refer to:

== Given name ==
- Ubayd Zakani, Persian poet and satirist of the 14th century
- Ubayd Allah al-Mahdi Billah, leader of the Fatimids

== Patronymic ==
- Amr ibn Ubayd, one of the earliest leaders in the "rationalist" theological movement of the Mu'tazilis

== See also ==
- Ubayd Allah (disambiguation) and variants
- Ubaydul Haq (disambiguation) and variants
- Ubayda, Arabian tunbūr or pandore player and singer
- Al-Ubaid (disambiguation), for other uses and various romanizations of the same name
