= Abd (Arabic) =

Arabic word for slave or servant

ʿAbd (Arabic: عبد) is an Arabic word meaning one who is subordinated as a slave or a servant, and it means the one who worships Allah. The word can also be transliterated into English as 'Abd, where the apostrophe indicates the Ayin, denoting a voiced pharyngeal fricative consonant or some reflex of it. In Western ears, it may be perceived as a guttural /a/ sound.

ʿĀbid (Arabic: عابد) is a given name meaning "worshipper". It is based on the Arabic word Ibadah, meaning "worship". The female version of the name is ʿĀbidah.

It appears in many common Arab names followed by al- ("the") in form of "Abdul", "Abd ul", "Abd ul-", etc.; this is also commonly transliterated as "el-," in the form "Abdel", "Abd el-", "Abd el-", etc., meaning "servant of the...". This is always followed by one of the names for God. These names are given in list of Arabic theophoric names and the 99 Names of God.

The widespread name Abdullah (or ʿAbd-Allah) means "servant of God" or "worshipper of God".

- Abd Rabbuh ("slave of his Lord" or "servant of his Lord")
- Abduh ("His slave" or "His servant")

Though this is regarded as Shirk by Sunnis, it is also used with humans, in the names:

- Abdul Nabi ("slave of the Prophet" or "servant of the Prophet")
- Abdul Rasul ("slave of the Messenger")
- Abdul Zahra (slave of Fatima—daughter of Muhammad)
- Abdul Hussein (slave of Hussein—grandson of Muhammad)

It can also be used by Arab Christians and Arabic-speaking Christians, just as long as it is associated to their religion:

- Abdul Masih ("slave of the Messiah" or "servant of the Messiah")
- Abdul Salib ("slave of the Cross" or "servant of the Cross")
- Abdul Shahid ("slave of the Martyr" or "servant of the Martyr")
- Abdul Yasu ("slave of Jesus" or "servant of Jesus")
- Abida
- Abidi

Abdullah can be also used by Arab Christians, as they refer to God as Allah.

== See also ==
=== From the same word family ===
- Abeed, the plural of ʿAbd, used as a racial slur
- Ibadah, service or servitude
- Abdi, a derivative of ʿabd, meaning "servant"
  - Al-Abdi
- Al-Ubaid, a diminutive derivate of ʿabd, meaning "little slave/servant"
- Ubeidiya, place-name derived from ʿubeid
- Ubayd Allah, also as Obaidullah/Obaydullah/Obeidallah/Ubaydullah, name that means "little servant of God"

=== Other ===
- Ghulam
- Qul
- Arabic names
- Black Guard
- Islamic views on slavery
- History of slavery in the Muslim world
