= Al-Ubaid =

Ubaid, Ebeid, Obeid, Obaid, Ubayd, Ubayyid, Ubaidi, the Americanized Obade, etc., used with or without the article Al- or El-, are all romanizations of أبيض or عبید, an Arabic word or name meaning 'white' (the former) or the diminutive form of ʿabd. The latter is often understood as the shortened form of Ubayd Allah, meaning "small/humble servant of God".

Ubeidiya: by adding the suffix -iya (also in different spellings), the meaning becomes "place of..." (Ubaid, 'Ubayd, etc.)

== People ==
The name as such in various spellings

- Ebeid, common Levantine or Egyptian spelling
- Obaid (name)
- Obeid (name)
- Ubayd (name)
- Ubaydul Haq (disambiguation)

Tribes and individuals

- Al-Ubaid (tribe), an Arab tribe
- Elijah Obade (born 1991), American-Lebanese basketball player

== Places ==
- El Obeid, a city in Sudan
- El Obeid Airport, Sudan
- Al Ubaidi, a town in Iraq
- Beit Obeid, or Beit Abid, a village in Zgharta District, in the Northern Governorate of Lebanon
- Tell al-'Ubaid, a small tell site west of Ur, Iraq
- 21712 Obaid (1999 RL96), a Main-belt Asteroid

== Other ==
- Ubaid period, a Neolithic and Chalcolithic period in Mesopotamia

== See also ==
- Abeed, an Arabic word meaning "servant" or "slave", used as an ethnic slur for Black people
- Abyad (disambiguation), Arabic word and name meaning 'white'. Some transliterations of abyad may overlap with those of ubaid.
  - Wadi al-Abyad or al-Ubayyid, wadi (valley) in Iraq
- Abadiyeh (disambiguation)
- Ubeidiya (disambiguation)
- Ubayd Allah, for the many variants of that name, based upon this one and the Arabic word for "God"
- Obadé, town in Burkina Faso (name unrelated to the Arabic word)
