= Predestination =

Doctrine in Christian theology

Predestination, in theology, is the doctrine that all events have been willed by God, usually with reference to the eventual fate of the individual soul. Explanations of predestination often seek to address the paradox of free will, whereby God's omniscience seems incompatible with human free will. In this usage, predestination can be regarded as a form of religious determinism; usually predeterminism, also known as theological determinism.

Predestination has been a topic of debate throughout Jewish and Christian history. Although most of Second Temple Judaism emphasized human free will, some pre-Christian texts like the Book of Enoch and writings found at Qumran seem to have included more deterministic ideas. Scholars debate New Testament passages such as Romans 8–11, with interpretations ranging from predestination being corporate or service-based, to God choosing some individuals for salvation while leaving others to reprobation. Jewish groups like the Essenes may have believed in predestination, but there were complex differences among sects.

In the early Christian centuries, the Patristic period saw varied views on predestination. Origen, Irenaeus and Justin Martyr tied predestination to foreknowledge of human actions, while other writings such as the Odes of Solomon may imply more deterministic views of election. Such views were also held by the Thomasines and Valentinus, who developed systems of election or salvation according to one's innate spiritual nature. Augustine of Hippo later emphasized that salvation results from God's grace rather than human merit, sparking debates over double predestination. Subsequent thinkers, including John of Damascus, Thomas Aquinas, and William of Ockham, further explored how God's providence, foreknowledge, and human freedom interact, with medieval and Reformation theologians like Gottschalk, Calvin, and Zwingli developing influential predestination doctrines, including double predestination.

Different Christian branches interpret predestination differently. Eastern Orthodoxy emphasizes the synergy of human effort and divine grace, while Roman Catholicism teaches that God predestines in harmony with human response and rejects predestining anyone to sin. Protestant traditions vary: Lutheranism affirms unconditional election to salvation but denies predestination to damnation, Calvinism teaches double predestination, and Arminianism links election to foreseen human faith. The LDS Church rejects predestination but teaches foreordination, emphasizing moral agency. Other variations, like corporate election, focus on God choosing groups or the church collectively rather than individuals.

== History ==
=== Pre-Christian period ===
The book of Enoch has been interpreted to be an example of Second Temple-era theological determinism.

Much of Second Temple Judaism reflected views which more closely resemble conditional election, in which election was often understood in a more corporate sense. However, there exists evidence that some in Second Temple Judaism seemed to have held more deterministic views of election, as particularly seen in texts found at Qumran. Writings such as the Treatise on the Two Spirits and the Thanksgiving Hymns refer to election as individual and unconditional. Other Second Temple writings, such as the Book of Sirach, have also been interpreted as implying more deterministic conceptions of election, although not as consistently as those at Qumran. However, others interpret Sirach as emphasizing free will over determinism. Similarly, writings such as the Book of Enoch have also been noted to indicate theological determinism, although one that is combined with dualism. The Book of Jubilees seems to harmonize or mix together a doctrine of free will and determinism.

New Testament scholar N. T. Wright argues that Josephus's portrayal of the ancient Jewish sects, namely the Pharisees, Sadducees, and Essenes, is fundamentally incorrect. Wright asserts that the historical debates between these groups centered on how and when God would physically liberate Israel from foreign rule, rather than abstract philosophical questions regarding predestination. In his view, the Essenes quietly withdrew to await divine intervention, whereas the Pharisees believed the Jewish people needed to actively cooperate with God's law to achieve freedom. Conversely, John Barclay responds that Josephus' description should be seen as an over-simplification rather than an outright error. Barclay contends that complex theological differences regarding fate and free will did exist among these sects, likely mirroring the philosophical variations Josephus outlined. Francis Watson has also argued on the basis of 4 Ezra, a document dated to the first century AD, that Jewish beliefs in predestination are primarily concerned with God's choice to save some individual Jews.

=== New Testament period ===
In the New Testament, Romans 8–11 presents a statement on predestination. In Romans 8:28–30, Paul writes,

We know that in everything God works for good with those who love him, who are called according to his purpose. For those whom he foreknew he also predestined to be conformed to the image of his Son, in order that he might be the first-born among many brethren. And those whom he predestined he also called; and those whom he called he also justified; and those whom he justified he also glorified.

Biblical scholars have interpreted this passage in several ways. Many say this only has to do with service, and is not about salvation. The Catholic biblical commentator Brendan Byrne wrote that the predestination mentioned in this passage should be interpreted as applied to the Christian community corporately rather than individuals. Another Catholic commentator, Joseph Fitzmyer, wrote that this passage teaches that God has predestined the salvation of all humans. Douglas Moo, a Protestant biblical interpreter, reads the passage as teaching that God has predestined a certain set of people to salvation, and predestined the remainder of humanity to reprobation (damnation). Similarly, Wright's interpretation is that in this passage Paul teaches that God will save those whom he has chosen, but Wright also emphasizes that Paul does not intend to suggest that God has eliminated human free will or responsibility. Instead, Wright asserts, Paul is saying that God's will works through that of humans to accomplish salvation.

=== Patristic period ===
==== Pre-Nicene period ====
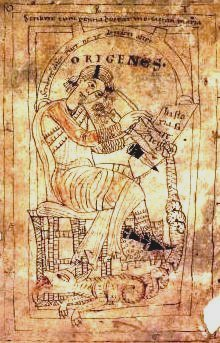
Origen of Alexandria held to a conditional view of election based on God's foreknowledge of human action.

Early Christian writers have been argued to have held a variety of views on predestination. Origen, writing in the third century, taught that God's providence extends to every individual. He believed God's predestination was based on God's foreknowledge of every individual's merits, whether in their current life or a previous life. Nevertheless some earlier Christians seemed to have a stronger emphasis of divine sovereignty in election, as writers such as Gregg Allison have argued that Clement of Rome reflected such an emphasis. Some verses in the Odes of Solomon, which was made by an Essene convert into Christianity, might possibly suggest a predestinarian worldview, where God chooses who are saved and go into heaven, although there is controversy about what it teaches. According to the American New Testament scholar Thomas R. Schreiner, the soteriology of the Odes is highly grace oriented being underlined by a doctrine of election and he argued the writer saw salvation as a work of God which is not accomplished by human merit. The Odes mentions God having: "imprinted a seal on the face of the elect before they existed."

Predestinarian views of salvation were seen in a number of theological groups outside the Proto-orthodox church. The Thomasines saw themselves as children of the light, but the ones who were not part of the elect community were sons of darkness. The Thomasines thus had a belief in a type of election or predestination, they saw themselves as elect because they were born from the light. Valentinus believed in a form of predestination, in his view humans are born into one of three natures, depending on which elements prevail in the person. In the views of Valentinus, a person born with a bad nature can never be saved because they are too inclined into evil, some people have a nature which is a mixture of good and evil, thus they can choose salvation, and others have a good nature, who will be saved, because they will be inclined into good.. The views of Valentinus were however criticized by other early Christians. Irenaeus attacked the doctrine of predestination set out by Valentinus, arguing that it is unfair. For Irenaeus, humans were free to choose salvation or not. Justin Martyr also criticized the predestinarian views held by some Greek philosophers.

==== Post-Nicene period ====
Later in the fourth and fifth centuries, Augustine of Hippo (354–430) also taught that God orders all things while preserving human freedom. Prior to 396, Augustine believed that predestination was based on God's foreknowledge of whether individuals would believe, that God's grace was "a reward for human assent". Later, in response to Pelagius, Augustine said that the sin of pride consists in assuming that "we are the ones who choose God or that God chooses us (in his foreknowledge) because of something worthy in us", and argued that it is God's grace that causes the individual act of faith. Augustine himself stated, "And thus Christ's Church has never failed to hold the faith of this predestination, which is now being defended with new solicitude against these modern heretics."

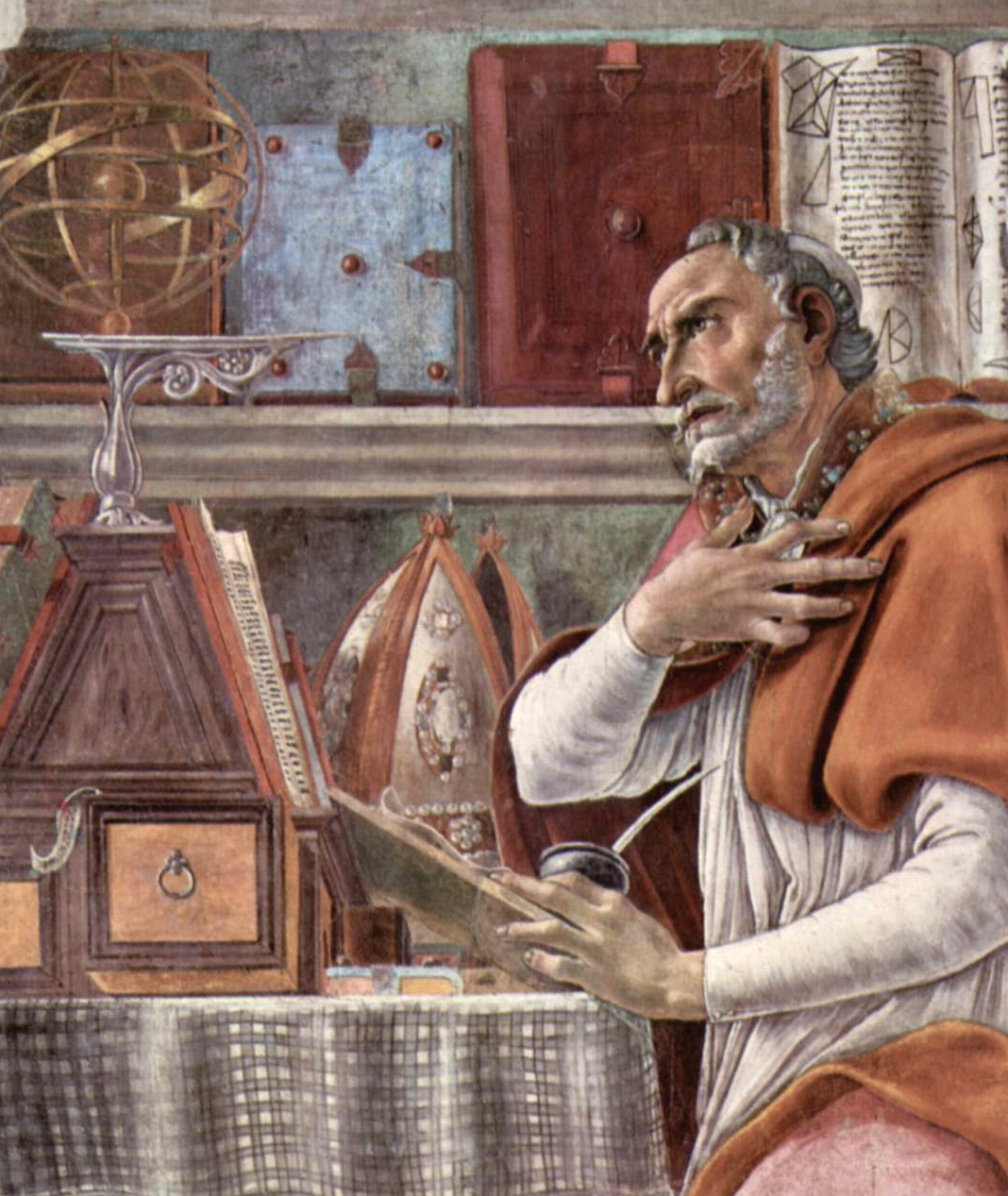
Augustine of Hippo taught unconditional election

Scholars are divided over whether Augustine's teaching implies double predestination, or the belief that God chooses some people for damnation as well as some for salvation. Catholic scholars tend to deny that he held such a view while some Protestants and secular scholars affirm that Augustine did believe in double predestination. The Council of Arles in the late fifth century condemned the position "that some have been condemned to death, others have been predestined to life", though this may seem to follow from Augustine's teaching. The Second Council of Orange in 529 also condemned the position that "some have been truly predestined to evil by divine power".

After Augustine, Prosper of Aquitaine (390 – c. 455 AD) defended Augustine's view of predestination against semi-Pelagians. Marius Mercator, who was a pupil of Augustine, wrote five books against Pelagianism and one book about predestination. Fulgentius of Ruspe and Caesarius of Arles rejected the view that God gives free choice to believe and instead believed in predestination. However, Augustine's position also raised objections. Julian of Eclanum expressed the view that Augustine was bringing Manichean thoughts into the church. For Vincent of Lérins, this was a disturbing innovation. Similarly, Cassian believed that despite predestination being a work that God does, God only decides to predestinate based on how human beings will respond. In the eighth century, John of Damascus emphasized the freedom of the human will in his doctrine of predestination, and argued that acts arising from peoples' wills are not part of God's providence at all. Damascene teaches that people's good actions are done in cooperation with God, but are not caused by him.

=== Middle Ages ===
Gottschalk of Orbais, a ninth-century Saxon monk, argued that God predestines some people to hell as well as predestining some to heaven, a view known as double predestination. He was condemned by several synods, but his views remained popular. Irish theologian John Scotus Eriugena wrote a refutation of Gottschalk. Eriugena abandoned Augustine's teaching on predestination. He wrote that God's predestination should be equated with his foreknowledge of people's choices.

In the thirteenth century, Thomas Aquinas taught that God predestines certain people to the beatific vision based solely on his own goodness rather than that of creatures. Aquinas also believed that people are free in their choices, fully cause their own sin, and are solely responsible for it. According to Aquinas, there are several ways in which God wills actions. He directly wills the good, indirectly wills evil consequences of good things, and only permits evil. Aquinas held that in permitting evil, God does not will it to be done or not to be done.

In the thirteenth century, William of Ockham taught that God does not cause human choices and equated predestination with divine foreknowledge. Though Ockham taught that God predestines based on people's foreseen works, he maintained that God's will was not constrained to do this. Medieval theologians who believed in predestination include: Ratramnus (died 868), Thomas Bradwardine (1300–1349), Gregory of Rimini (1300–1358), John Wycliffe (1320s–1384), Johann Ruchrat von Wesel (died 1481), Girolamo Savonarola (1452–1498) and Johannes von Staupitz (1460–1524).

The medieval Cathars denied the free will of humans.

=== Reformation ===
John Calvin rejected the idea that God permits rather than actively decrees the damnation of sinners, as well as other evil. Calvin did not believe God to be guilty of sin, but rather he considered God inflicting sin upon his creations to be an unfathomable mystery. Though he maintained God's predestination applies to damnation as well as salvation, he taught that the damnation of the damned is caused by their sin, but that the salvation of the saved is solely caused by God. Other Protestant Reformers, including Huldrych Zwingli, also held double predestinarian views.

== Views of Christian branches ==
=== Eastern Orthodoxy ===
The Eastern Orthodox view was summarized by Bishop Theophan the Recluse in response to the question, "What is the relationship between the Divine provision and our free will?"

Answer: The fact that the Kingdom of God is "taken by force" presupposes personal effort. When the Apostle Paul says, "it is not of him that willeth," this means that one's efforts do not produce what is sought. It is necessary to combine them: to strive and to expect all things from grace. It is not one's own efforts that will lead to the goal, because without grace, efforts produce little; nor does grace without effort bring what is sought, because grace acts in us and for us through our efforts. Both combine in a person to bring progress and carry him to the goal. (God's) foreknowledge is unfathomable. It is enough for us with our whole heart to believe that it never opposes God's grace and truth, and that it does not infringe man's freedom. Usually this resolves as follows: God foresees how a man will freely act and makes dispositions accordingly. Divine determination depends on the life of a man, and not his life upon the determination.

=== Roman Catholicism ===
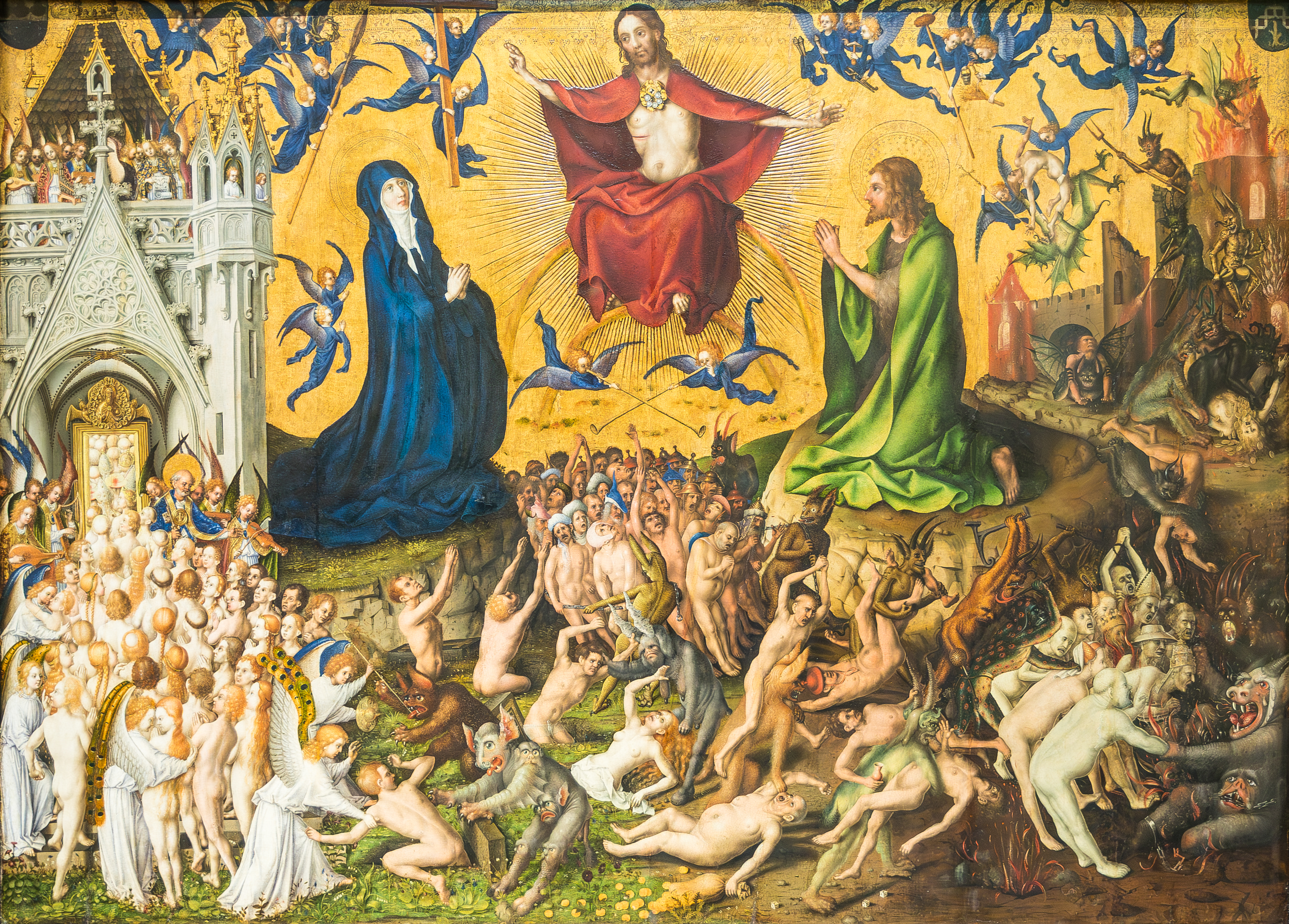
Stefan Lochner, Last Judgement, c. 1435. Wallraf-Richartz Museum, Cologne

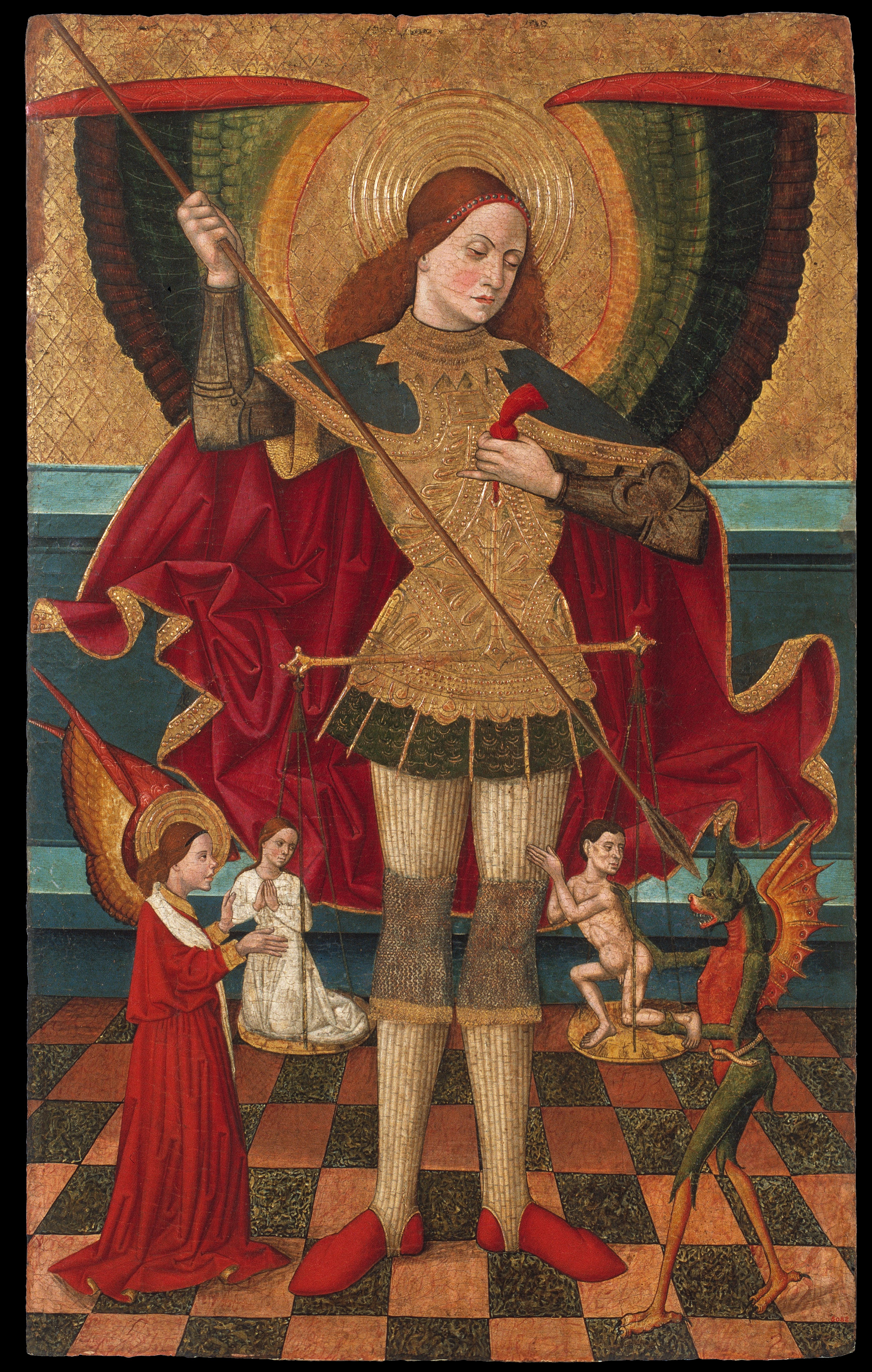
Juan de la Abadía el Viejo: Saint Michael Weighing Souls

Roman Catholicism teaches the doctrine of predestination. The Catechism of the Catholic Church says, "To God, all moments of time are present in their immediacy. When therefore He establishes His eternal plan of 'predestination', He includes in it each person's free response to his grace."

According to the Roman Catholic Church, God does not will anyone to mortally sin and so to deserve punishment in hell.

Pope John Paul II wrote:

The universality of salvation means that it is granted not only to those who explicitly believe in Christ and have entered the Church. Since salvation is offered to all, it must be made concretely available to all. But it is clear that today, as in the past, many people do not have an opportunity to come to know or accept the gospel revelation or to enter the Church. (...) For such people salvation in Christ is accessible by virtue of a grace which, while having a mysterious relationship to the Church, does not make them formally part of the Church but enlightens them in a way which is accommodated to their spiritual and material situation. This grace comes from Christ; it is the result of his Sacrifice and is communicated by the Holy Spirit. It enables each person to attain salvation through his or her free cooperation.

Augustine of Hippo laid the foundation for much of the later Roman Catholic teaching on predestination. His teachings on grace and free will were largely adopted by the Second Council of Orange (529), whose decrees were directed against the Semipelagians. Augustine wrote,

[God] promised not from the power of our will but from His own predestination. For He promised what He Himself would do, not what men would do. Because, although men do those good things which pertain to God's worship, He Himself makes them to do what He has commanded; it is not they that cause Him to do what He has promised. Otherwise the fulfilment of God's promises would not be in the power of God, but in that of men"

Thomas Aquinas' views concerning predestination are largely in agreement with Augustine and can be summarized by many of his writings in his Summa Theologiæ:

God does reprobate some. For it was said above (A[1]) that predestination is a part of providence. To providence, however, it belongs to permit certain defects in those things which are subject to providence, as was said above (Q[22], A[2]). Thus, as men are ordained to eternal life through the providence of God, it likewise is part of that providence to permit some to fall away from that end; this is called reprobation. Thus, as predestination is a part of providence, in regard to those ordained to eternal salvation, so reprobation is a part of providence in regard to those who turn aside from that end. Hence reprobation implies not only foreknowledge, but also something more, as does providence, as was said above (Q[22], A[1]). Therefore, as predestination includes the will to confer grace and glory; so also reprobation includes the will to permit a person to fall into sin, and to impose the punishment of damnation on account of that sin."

=== Protestantism ===
==== Comparison ====
This table summarizes the classical views of three different Protestant beliefs.

Topic	Lutheranism	Calvinism	Arminianism
Election	Unconditional election to salvation only	Unconditional election to salvation only, with reprobation (passing over)	Conditional election in view of foreseen faith or unbelief

==== Lutheranism ====
Lutherans historically hold to unconditional election to salvation. However, some do not believe that there are certain people that are predestined to salvation, but salvation is predestined for those who seek God. Lutherans believe Christians should be assured that they are among the predestined. However, they disagree with those who make predestination the source of salvation rather than Christ's suffering, death, and resurrection. Unlike some Calvinists, Lutherans do not believe in a predestination to damnation. Instead, Lutherans teach eternal damnation is a result of the unbeliever's rejection of the forgiveness of sins and unbelief.

==== Calvinism ====
Predestination is a doctrine in Calvinism dealing with the question of the control that God exercises over the world. In the words of the Westminster Confession of Faith, God "freely and unchangeably ordained whatsoever comes to pass." The second use of the word "predestination" applies this to salvation, and refers to the belief that God appointed the eternal destiny of some to salvation by grace, while leaving the remainder to receive eternal damnation for all their sins, even their original sin. The former is called "unconditional election", and the latter "reprobation". In Calvinism, some people are predestined and effectually called in due time (regenerated/born again) to faith by God while all others are reprobated.

==== Arminianism ====
At the beginning of the 17th century, the Dutch theologian Jacobus Arminius formulated Arminianism and disagreed with Calvin in particular on election and predestination. Arminianism is defined by God's limited mode of providence. This mode of providence affirms the compatibility between human free will and divine foreknowledge, but also its incompatibility with theological determinism. Thus predestination in Arminianism is based on divine foreknowledge, unlike in Calvinism. It is therefore a predestination by foreknowledge.

From this perspective, comes the notion of a conditional election on the one who wills to have faith in God for salvation.

=== The Church of Jesus Christ of Latter-day Saints ===
The Church of Jesus Christ of Latter-day Saints (LDS Church) rejects the doctrine of predestination, but does believe in foreordination. Foreordination, an important doctrine of the LDS Church, teaches that during the pre-mortal existence, God selected ("foreordained") particular people to fulfill certain missions ("callings") during their mortal lives.

The LDS Church teaches the doctrine of moral agency, the ability to choose and act for oneself, and decide whether to accept Christ's atonement.

== Types of predestination ==
=== Supralapsarianism and infralapsarianism ===
In common English parlance, the doctrine of predestination often has particular reference to the doctrines of Calvinism. The version of predestination espoused by John Calvin, after whom Calvinism is named, is sometimes referred to as "double predestination" because in it God predestines some people for salvation (i.e. unconditional election) and some for condemnation (i.e. reprobation) which results by allowing the individual's own sins to condemn them. Calvin himself defines predestination as "the eternal decree of God, by which he determined with himself whatever he wished to happen with regard to every man. Not all are created on equal terms, but some are preordained to eternal life, others to eternal damnation; and, accordingly, as each has been created for one or other of these ends, we say that he has been predestined to life or to death."

On the spectrum of beliefs concerning predestination, Calvinism is the strongest form among Christians. It teaches that God's predestining decision is based on the knowledge of his own will rather than foreknowledge, concerning every particular person and event; and, God continually acts with entire freedom, in order to bring about his will in completeness, but in such a way that the freedom of the creature is not violated, "but rather, established".

Calvinists who hold the infralapsarian view of predestination usually prefer that term to "supralapsarianism," perhaps with the intent of blocking the inference that they believe predestination is on the basis of foreknowledge (supralapsarian meaning, assuming the fall into sin). The different terminology has the benefit of distinguishing the Calvinist double predestination version of infralapsarianism from Lutheranism's view that predestination is a mystery, which forbids the unprofitable intrusion of prying minds since God only reveals partial knowledge to the human race.

=== Double predestination ===
Double predestination, or the double decree, is the doctrine that God actively reprobates, or decrees damnation of some, as well as salvation for those whom he has elected. During the Protestant Reformation John Calvin held this double predestinarian view: "By predestination we mean the eternal decree of God, by which he determined with himself whatever he wished to happen with regard to every man. All are not created on equal terms, but some are preordained to eternal life, others to eternal damnation; and, accordingly, as each has been created for one or other of these ends, we say that he has been predestinated to life or to death."

Gottschalk of Orbais taught double predestination explicitly in the ninth century, and Gregory of Rimini in the fourteenth. Some trace this doctrine to statements made by Augustine in the early fifth century that on their own also seem to teach double predestination, but in the context of his other writings it is not clear whether he held this view. In The City of God, Augustine describes all of humanity as being predestinated for salvation (i.e., the city of God) or damnation (i.e., the earthly city of man); but Augustine also held that all human beings were born "reprobate" but "need not necessarily remain" in that state of reprobation.

=== Corporate election ===
Corporate election is a non-traditional Arminian view of election. In corporate election, God does not choose which individuals he will save prior to creation, but rather God chooses the church as a whole. Or put differently, God chooses a group of people he will save (members of the church), and individuals may work their way into (or out of) the said group. Another way the New Testament puts this is to say that God chose the church in Christ Ephesians 1:4. In other words, God chose from all eternity to save all those who would be found in Christ, by faith in God. This choosing is not primarily about salvation from eternal destruction either but is about God's chosen agency in the world. Thus individuals have full freedom in terms of whether they become members of the church or not.

=== Predestination to holiness and glory ===
Predestination to holiness and glory differs from Calvinist and Arminian predestination in that people are chosen, predestined, and called to holiness 1 Thessalonians 4:7 and glory 1 Peter 5:10, not to becoming saved. It differs from Arminian predestination and corporate election in that it's not based on who is foreknown to believe, or as part of a group, but on who is personally and individually foreknown in Messiah Romans 16:13, Revelation 17:8.

== See also ==
- Biochemical Predestination – 1969 book by Dean H. Kenyon and Gary Steinman
- Clockwork universe – Deterministic model of the universe
- Eternal security – Christian belief
- Fatalism – Philosophical doctrine on the subjugation of all events to fate
- Jansenism – Catholic theological movement
- Oedipus Rex – Classical Athenian tragedy by Sophocles
- Predestination (film) – 2014 film directed by the Spierig brothers
- Predestination in Islam – Concept of divine destiny in Islam
- Providentialism – Belief that all events on Earth are controlled by God
- Theological determinism – Form of predeterminism
- The Protestant Ethic and the Spirit of Capitalism – 1905 sociology book by Max Weber
- Vocation – Occupation to which a person is especially drawn or for which they are especially suited
