= Ebeid =

Ebeid or Ebaid (Arabic: عبيد) is an Arabic surname, commonly found in Egypt. Its spelling in Roman characters as such is most commonly a transliteration of the Levantine or Egyptian Arabic pronunciation of the name Ubayd, spelt identically in Arabic. Other transliterations and pronunciations of the name include Obeid.

Ebeid may refer to:

== People ==
- Anis Ebeid (1909–1988), Egyptian translator, translator of many Hollywood films into Arabic
- Atef Ebeid (1932–2014), former prime minister of Egypt
- Makram Ebeid (1879–1961), Egyptian politician
- Mona Makram-Ebeid (born 1943), Egyptian politician
- Nabila Ebeid (born 1945), Egyptian actress
- Nadia Makram Ebeid, Egyptian academic
- Nary Ebeid (born 1979/1980), American contestant on The Amazing Race 20

== Others ==
- Ebeid Cabinet, government of Egypt that was led by Egyptian prime minister Atef Ebeid 1999–2004

== See also ==
- Al-Ubaid (disambiguation), for other uses and various romanizations of the same name
- Ubaydul Haq (disambiguation) and variants
