= Abadía (surname) =

Abadía is a Spanish surname. Notable people with the surname include:

- Adrián Abadía (born 2002), Spanish diver
- Agustín Abadía (born 1962), Spanish footballer
- Domingo Ascaso Abadía (1895–1937), Aragonese anarchist and trade union leader
- Francisco Javier Abadía (1770–1836), Spanish lieutenant general and minister of war
- Guillermo Abadía Morales (1912–2010), Colombian linguist, academic, folklorist and anthropologist
- Juan Carlos Ramírez Abadía (born 1963), Colombian drug trafficker
- Juan de la Abadía (fl. 1470–1498, probable death 1498), Spanish painter
- Miguel Abadía Méndez (1867–1947), President of Colombia
- Nelson Abadía (born 1956), Colombian football manager
