= Abadiyeh =

Abadiyeh, Abadiyah, Aabadiyeh and other romanisations, preceded or not by the article al- or el-, is an Arabic place-name derived from the word ʿabd, meaning 'slave', 'servant', or 'worshipper'. It is often understood as the shortened form of ʿAbd Allah, meaning "servant of God". The suffix -iya, in all its different transliterations, means "place of...", creating for Abadiyeh the meaning of "place of the slave/servant/worshipper' (of God).

Abadiyeh may refer to the following places:

- Abadiyeh, Egypt, an archaeological site in Egypt
- Abadiyeh, Lebanon, a town near Beirut

== See also ==
- Abidiya, a town in Sudan
- Ubeidiya (disambiguation), a different spellings
- Abadia (disambiguation)
- Obadiah (disambiguation)
