= Juan de la Abadia =

To be distinguished from the painter Juan de la Abadía the elder

Juan de la Abadia (fl. 15th century) was a marrano who engaged in a project to subvert the Inquisition in Aragon; failing in this, he joined in a plot to assassinate the inquisitor Pedro de Arbués, who was wounded on September 15, 1485, and died two days later. De la Abadia was apprehended, and, according to Heinrich Graetz, killed himself in prison. However, Meyer Kayserling states that he survived the suicide attempt, and that he was drawn, quartered, and consigned to the flames.
