= Predestination in Calvinism =

Theological doctrine

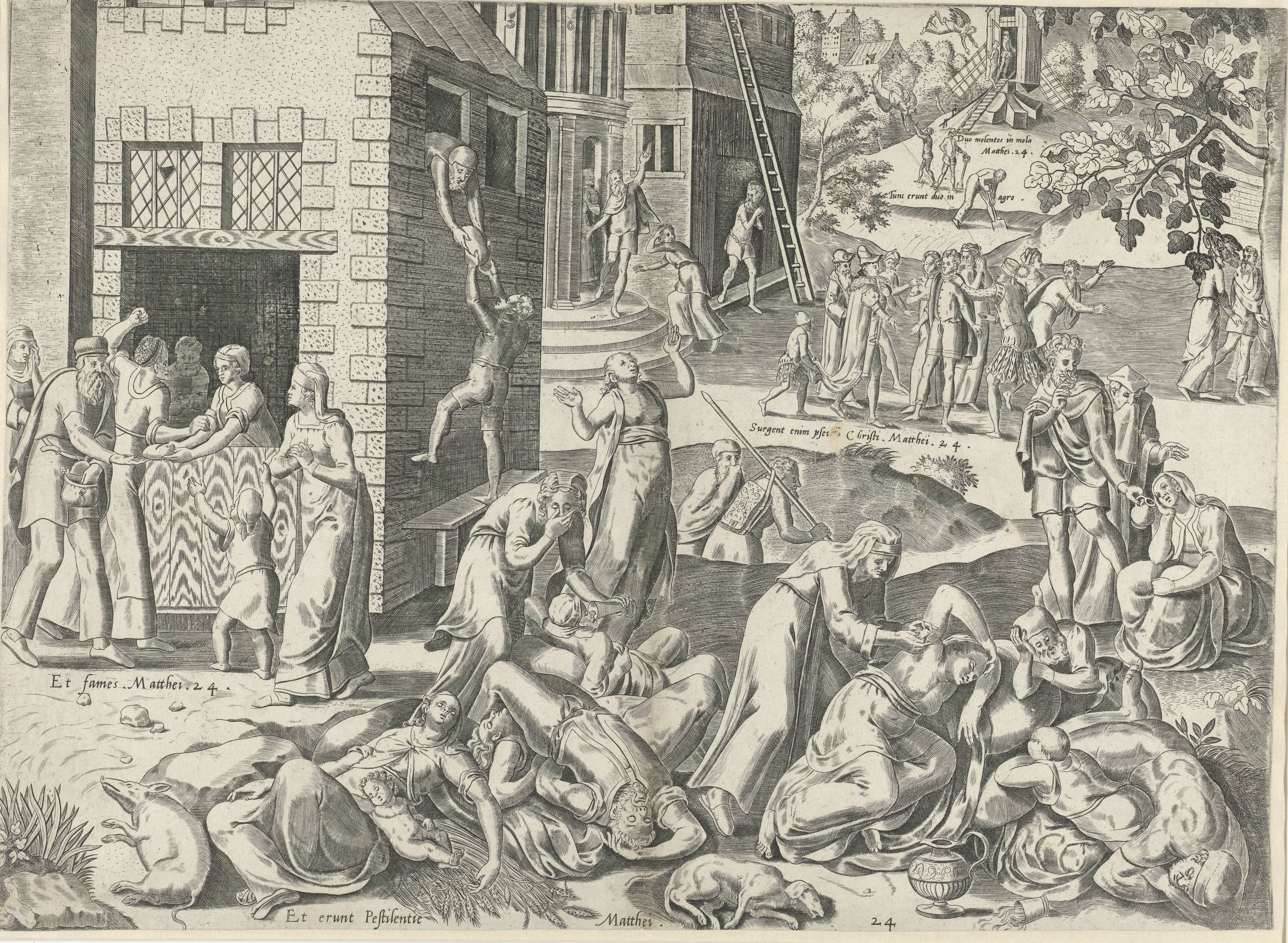
This etching by Frans Hogenberg illustrates the Second Coming of Christ and references the Olivet Discourse. Angels can be seen gathering the elect.

Predestination is a doctrine in Calvinism dealing with the question of the control that God exercises over the world. In the words of the Westminster Confession of Faith, God "freely and unchangeably ordained whatsoever comes to pass." The second use of the word "predestination" applies this to salvation, and refers to the belief that God appointed the eternal destiny of some to salvation by grace, while leaving the remainder to receive eternal damnation for all their sins, even their original sin. The former is called "unconditional election", and the latter "reprobation". In Calvinism, some people are predestined and effectually called in due time (regenerated/born again) to faith by God while all others are reprobated.

Calvinism places more emphasis on election compared to other branches of Christianity.

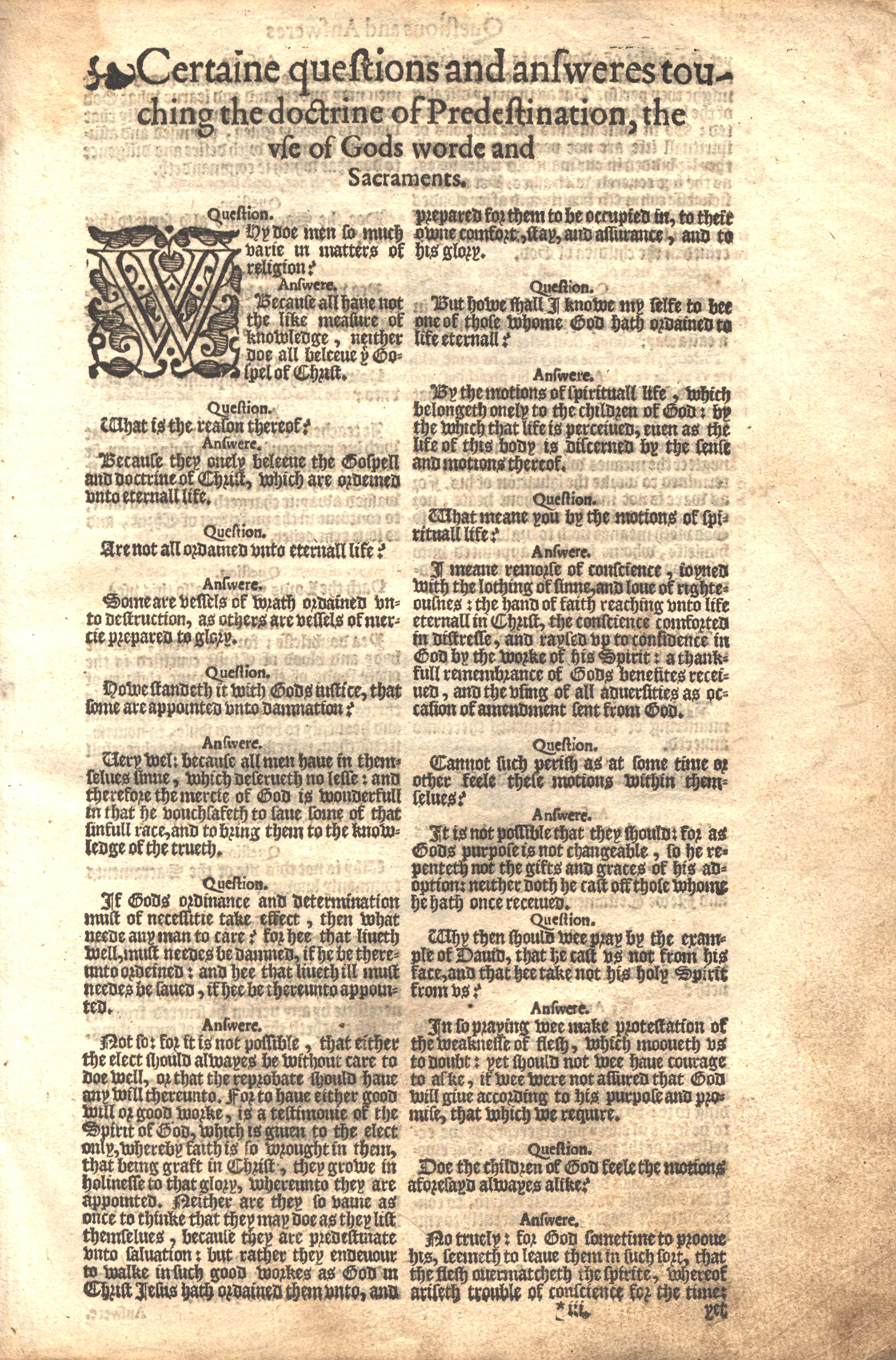
The Doctrine of Predestination explained in a Question and Answer Format from a 1589/1594 Geneva Bible

== Origins ==
Predestination of the elect and non-elect was taught by the Jewish Essene sect, Gnosticism, and Manichaeism. In Christian theology, the doctrine that God unilaterally predestines some persons to heaven and some to hell was first expressed by Augustine of Hippo during the Pelagian controversy in 412 AD. Pelagius and his followers taught that people are not born with original sin and can choose to be good or evil. The controversy caused Augustine to radically reinterpret the teachings of the apostle Paul, arguing that faith is a free gift from God rather than something humans can choose. Noting that not all will hear or respond to God's offered covenant, Augustine considered that "the more general care of God for the world becomes particularised in God's care for the elect". He explicitly defended God's justice in sending newborn and stillborn babies to hell if they died without baptism.

== Double predestination ==
Double predestination is the idea that not only does God choose some to be saved, he also creates some people who will be damned.

Some modern Calvinists respond to the ethical dilemma of double predestination by explaining that God's active predestination is only for the elect. God provides grace to the elect causing salvation, but for the damned God withholds salvific grace. Calvinists teach that God remains just and fair in creating persons he predestines to damnation because although God unilaterally works in the elect producing regeneration, God does not actively force the damned to sin.

Double predestination may not be the view of any of the Reformed confessions, which speak of God passing over rather than actively reprobating the damned. However, John Calvin rejected such a position, stating: "This they do ignorantly and childishly since there could be no election without its opposite reprobation ... whom God passes by he reprobates, and that for no other cause but because he is pleased to exclude them from the inheritance which he predestines to his children."

Scholars have disagreed over whether Heinrich Bullinger accepted the doctrine of double predestination. Frank A. James says that he rejected it, preferring a view called "single predestination" where God elects some to salvation, but does not in any way predestine to reprobation. Cornelis Venema, on the other hand, argues that "Bullinger did not consistently articulate a doctrine of single predestination," and defended double predestination on a few occasions.

=== Calvin's writings ===
John Calvin taught double predestination. He wrote the foundational work on this topic, Institutes of the Christian Religion (1539), while living in Strasbourg after his expulsion from Geneva and consulting regularly with the Reformed theologian Martin Bucer. Calvin's belief in the uncompromised "sovereignty of God" spawned his doctrines of providence and predestination. For the world, without providence it would be "unlivable". For individuals, without predestination "no one would be saved".

Calvin's doctrine of providence is straightforward. "All events whatsoever are governed by the secret counsel of God." Therefore, "nothing happens but what [God] has knowingly and willingly decreed." This excludes "fortune and chance." Calvin applied his doctrine of providence concerning "all events" to individuals and their salvation in his doctrine of predestination.

Calvin opened his exposition of predestination with an "actual fact". The "actual fact" that Calvin observed was that even among those to whom "the covenant of life" is preached, it does not gain the same acceptance. Although, "all are called to repentance and faith", in fact, "the spirit of repentance and faith is not given to all".

Calvin turned to the teachings of Jesus for a theological interpretation of the diversity that some people accept the "covenant of life" and some do not. Pointing to the Parable of the Sower, Calvin observed, "it is no new thing for the seed to fall among thorns or in stony places". In Jesus' teaching in John 6:65 that "no one can come to me unless it has been granted him by my Father", Calvin found the key to his theological interpretation of the diversity.

For Calvin's biblically based theology, this diversity reveals the "unsearchable depth of the divine judgment", a judgment "subordinate to God's purpose of eternal election". God offers salvation to some, but not to all. To many this seems a perplexing subject, because they deem it "incongruous that ... some should be predestinated to salvation, and others to destruction". However, Calvin asserted that the incongruity can be resolved by proper views concerning "election and predestination".

Thus, Calvin based his theological description of people as "predestinated to life or to death" on biblical authority and "actual fact". Calvin noted that Scripture requires that we "consider this great mystery" of predestination, but he also warned against unrestrained "human curiosity" regarding it. For believers, knowing that "the cause of our salvation did not proceed from us, but from God alone" evokes gratitude.

=== Reprobation: active decree, passive foreordination ===
Calvinists emphasise the active nature of God's decree to choose those foreordained to eternal wrath, yet at the same time the passive nature of that foreordination.

This is possible because most Calvinists hold to an infralapsarian view of God's decree. In that view, God, before Creation, in his mind, first decreed that the Fall of Man would take place, before decreeing election and reprobation. So God actively chooses whom to condemn, but because he knows they will have a sinful nature, the way he foreordains them is to simply let them be – this is sometimes called "preterition." Therefore, this foreordination to wrath is passive in nature (unlike God's active predestination of his elect where he needs to overcome their sinful nature).

=== Equal ultimacy ===
The Westminster Confession of Faith uses different words for the act of God's election and reprobation: "predestinated" and "foreordained" respectively. This suggests that the two do not operate in the same way. The term "equal ultimacy" is sometimes used of the view that the two decrees are symmetrical: God works equally to keep the elect in heaven and the reprobate out of heaven. This view is sometimes erroneously referred to as "double predestination", on which see above. R. C. Sproul argues against this position on the basis that it implies God "actively intervenes to work sin" in the lives of the reprobate. Robert L. Reymond, however, insists on equal ultimacy of election and reprobation in the divine decree, though he suggests that "we must not speak of an exact identity of divine causality behind both."

Calvinists hold that even if their scheme is characterized as a form of determinism, it is one which insists upon the free agency and moral responsibility of the individual. Additionally, they hold that the will is in bondage to sin and therefore unable to actualize its true freedom. Hence, an individual whose will is enslaved to sin cannot choose to serve God. Since Calvinists further hold that salvation is by grace apart from good works (sola gratia) and since they view making a choice to trust God as an action or work, they maintain that the act of choosing cannot be the difference between salvation and damnation, as in the Arminian scheme. Rather, God must first free the individual from his enslavement to sin to a greater degree than in Arminianism, and then the regenerated heart naturally chooses the good. This work by God is sometimes called irresistible, in the sense that grace enables a person to freely cooperate, being set free from the desire to do the opposite, so that cooperation is not the cause of salvation but the other way around.

== Barthian views ==
20th century Reformed theologian Karl Barth reinterpreted the Reformed doctrine of predestination. For Barth, God elects Christ as rejected and chosen man. Individual people are not the subjects of election, but are elected or rejected by virtue of their being in Christ. Interpreters of Barth such as Shirley Guthrie have called this a "Trinitarian" as opposed to a "speculative" view of predestination. According to Guthrie, God freely loves all people, and his just condemnation of sinners is motivated by love and a desire for reconciliation.

== See also ==
- Five points of Calvinism
- Predestination
- Reprobation
- Theological determinism
- Theological fatalism
- Two-Seed-in-the-Spirit Predestinarian Baptists
- Unconditional election
- John Calvin
