= Abadia =

Abadia may refer to:

== People ==
- Abadía (surname)

== Places ==
- Abadía, a Spanish municipality
- The historical name of Abbadia Alpina, a small town near Pinerolo in the Province of Turin, north-west Italy
- Abadia de Goiás, a municipality in Brazil
- Abadia Retuerta, Spain
- El Abadia, a town in Algeria
- El Abadia District, Algeria

== Biology ==
- Abadia (bug), a genus of shield bugs in the tribe Halyini

== See also ==
- Abadiyeh (disambiguation)
