= Obaid (name) =

Obaid is one romanization of the Arabic name also written Ubaid or Obeid. It is used as a masculine given name and a surname.

== Given name ==
- Obaid Khalifa (born 1985), Emirati football player
- Obaid Mohamed (born 1979), Emirati football player
- Obaid Siddiqi (born 1932), Indian researcher

== Surname ==
- Musa Amer Obaid, (born 1985), Qatari athlete
- Sharmeen Obaid-Chinay (born 1978) Pakistani journalist
- Thoraya Obaid (born 1945), Saudi Arabian politician and diplomat

== Compound names with the element Obaid ==
- Abu Asad Mohammed Obaidul Ghani (1903–1973), West Bengal politician
- Md Obaidul Kabir Chowdhury (born 1951), Bangladeshi dermatologist
- Obaidul Quader (born 1952), Bangladeshi government minister
- R. A. Mohammad Obaidul Muktadir Chowdhury (born 1955), Bangladeshi government minister
- Obaidul Hassan (born 1959), 24th Chief Justice of Bangladesh
- Obaidul Karim, Bangladeshi businessman
- Obaidul Haq (disambiguation), multiple people
- Obaidullah, multiple people

== See also ==
- Al-Ubaid (disambiguation), for other uses and various romanizations of the same name
- Obadiah (disambiguation)
- Ubaydul Haq (disambiguation) and variants
