= Coptic names =

Coptic names are the personal names used by the Copts, the indigenous inhabitants of Egypt. They reflect the intersection of Egyptian, Greek and Arab influences in the region and encompass a diverse range of naming practices, which have evolved over centuries.

== History ==
The oldest layer of the Egyptian naming tradition is native Egyptian names. These can be either traced back to pre-Coptic stage of the language, attested in Hieroglyphic, Hieratic or Demotic texts (i.e. ⲁⲙⲟⲩⲛ Amoun, ⲛⲁⲃⲉⲣϩⲟ Naberho, ϩⲉⲣⲟⲩⲱϫ Herwōč, ⲧⲁⲏⲥⲓ Taēsi) or be first attested in Coptic texts and derived from purely Coptic lemmas (i.e. ⲡⲁⲛⲓⲣⲁⲛ Paniran, ⲡⲁⲙⲃⲱ Pambō, ⲗⲟⲩⲗⲉ Loule, ⲧⲁⲗⲟⲩϣⲏⲙ Taloušēm).

The conquest of Egypt by Alexander the Great and subsequent rule of the Ptolemaic dynasty led to Hellenisation of Egypt, which led to adoption of a great number of Greek names by the Copts (i.e. ⲅⲉⲱⲣⲅⲓⲟⲥ Geōrgios, ⲡⲁⲩⲗⲟⲥ Paulos, ⲑⲉⲟⲇⲱⲣⲟⲥ Theodōros, ⲑⲉⲕⲗⲁ Thekla, ⲕⲗⲉⲟⲡⲁⲧⲣⲁ Kleopatra), which was advanced even further by the Christianization and influx of Hellenised Hebrew and Aramaic names (i.e. ⲓⲱϩⲁⲛⲛⲏⲥ Iōhannēs, ⲓⲱⲥⲏⲫ Iōsēph, ⲁⲃⲣⲁϩⲁⲙ Abraham, ⲉⲗⲓⲥⲁⲃⲉⲧ Elisabet). Most names with exclusively pagan connotations, both Egyptian and Greek, fell out of use after the 3rd century, although some persisted, taken from the martyrdoms of venerated saints, e.g. Anoup, Phib, Diogenes, Phoibammon, Shenoute, Sarapion, Onnophris.

The Roman conquest of Egypt added Latin names to Egyptian naming tradition (ⲃⲓⲕⲧⲱⲣ Viktōr, ⲥⲉⲩⲏⲣⲟⲥ Sevēros). Over time, many of these foreign names were gradually Egyptianized, while some Egyptian names underwent Hellenization, resulting in the development of a distinctive syncretic Graeco-Egyptian naming tradition. Some names became closely associated with certain regions: Pousi, Sambas, Ioulios, Nilammon and Gerontios with Faiyum; Taurinos, Pamoun and Pjol with Middle Egypt , while Souai, Chenetom, Kalapesios, Psan and Sourous were popular around Thebes.

After the Arab conquests of the Middle East, the Arabs implemented a policy of strict segregation to subjugate the native inhabitants of the occupied lands, including the Copts in Egypt. This policy aimed to easily identify and exploit them financially. The second Caliph, Umar I, established a code known as "The Pact of Umar" that governed the relationship between ruling Muslims and the non-Muslim "People of the Book" (including Christians). The code restricted non-Muslims from using certain names, nicknames, and kunyas. The Sunni jurist Ibn Qayyim al-Jawziyya emphasized that Muslim names were reserved exclusively for Muslims, while non-Muslims were allowed to use their own names or shared names. However, non-Muslims were prohibited from using names that implied honor or virtue, e.g. Rashid (Arabic: رشيد, lit. 'rightly guided') or Salih (Arabic: صالح, lit. 'good').

Despite these strict restrictions, changes began to emerge over time. During the Fatimid Dynasty, which ruled Egypt from 969 to 1171 and followed the Ismaili branch of Shia Islam, there was a relative period of tolerance towards the Copts. The Fatimids sought the support of the educated Coptic population and relaxed some of the Sunni restrictions. As a result, Copts started assimilating into Arab and Muslim culture to escape social segregation and promote social mobility. This included adopting Arab and Muslim names for their children, as well as using nicknames and kunyas that were previously exclusive to Arabs and Muslims.

== Given names ==
=== Egyptian (Note: The Arabic version of the name is given if it has survived into usage after the language shift or is mentioned in the Synaxarium.) ===
Coptic	Arabic	Translation
Male names
ⲁⲙⲟⲩⲛ (Amoun)	Arabic: آمون, romanized: Amūn	Ancient Egyptian: Ỉmn, lit. 'Amun'
ⲁⲛⲟⲩⲡ (Anoup)	Arabic: أنوب, romanized: Anūb	Ancient Egyptian: Ỉnpw, lit. 'Anubis'
ⲁⲧⲣⲉ (Atre)	Arabic: أثريه, romanized: Athrīya	Ancient Egyptian: ḥtr, lit. 'a twin'
ⲃⲁⲛⲉ (Vane)	Arabic: فانا, romanized: Fāna	Ancient Egyptian: Bne, from Proto-Semitic *ban- "son"
ⲃⲉⲛⲓⲡⲓ (Venipi)	Arabic: وانيبى, romanized: Wanībi	Ancient Egyptian: bjꜣ n pt, lit. 'iron, lit. "metal of the heaven"'
ⲃⲉⲛⲟϥⲉⲣ (Venofer)	Arabic: نُوفِير, romanized: Nūfir	Ancient Egyptian: wnn-nfrw, lit. 'he who is in a state of well-being', an epithet of Anubis
ⲃⲏⲥ (Vēs)	Arabic: ويصا, romanized: Wīsa, Arabic: فاصا, romanized: Fāsa	Ancient Egyptian: Bi-s, lit. 'Bes'
ⲉⲃⲱⲛϩ (Evōnh)	Arabic: إيبونه, romanized: Ibūna	Ancient Egyptian: Ỉw-f-ʿnḫ, lit. 'may he live'
ⲕⲉⲗⲗⲟⲩϫ (Kellouj)	Arabic: كَلُوج, romanized: Kalūj	Ancient Egyptian: ḳꜣlꜣwḏꜣ, lit. 'a whelp'
ⲛⲁⲃⲉⲣϩⲟ (Naverho)	Arabic: نَهْرُوه, romanized: Nahrūh	Ancient Egyptian: nfr-ḥr, lit. 'beautiful in face', an epithet of Ptah
ⲛⲁϩⲣⲱⲟⲩ (Nahrōw)	Arabic: نَهْرُوه, romanized: Nahrūh	Ancient Egyptian: Ỉr.t-Ḥr-r.rw, lit. 'the eye of Horus is against them'
ⲟⲩⲉⲣϣⲉⲛⲟⲩϥⲓ (Weršenoufi)	Arabic: ورشنوفة, romanized: Waršanūfa	Ancient Egyptian: wršy-nfr, lit. 'good guardian'
ⲡⲁⲏⲥⲓ (Paēsi)	Arabic: ابا يسي, romanized: Abaīsi	Ancient Egyptian: Pa-Ỉs.t, lit. 'the one of Isis'
ⲡⲁⲙⲃⲱ (Pambō)	Arabic: بموا, romanized: Bemwā	ⲡⲁ- (possessive masculine article) + ⲙⲃⲱ ("Ombos"), "the one of Ombos"
ⲡⲁⲙⲓⲛ (Pamin)	Arabic: بمين, romanized: Bamīn	Ancient Egyptian: pꜣ-mn, lit. 'the one of Min'
ⲡⲓⲗⲓϩⲏⲩ (Pilihēi)	Arabic: بلحاو, romanized: Bilihāw	"possessing profit, useful"
ⲡⲉⲙⲥⲁϩ(Pemsah)	Arabic: بامساح, romanized: Bamsāh; Arabic: امساح, romanized: Amsāh	Ancient Egyptian: Pȝ-Msḥ, lit. 'the crocodile'
ⲡⲁⲛⲁⲩ (Panau)	Arabic: باناو, romanized: Bānāū	From ⲡⲁ- (possessive masculine article) + ⲛ- (genitive marker) + ⲁⲩ ("donkey"), "donkey driver" or "the one of Set"
ⲫⲁⲛⲓⲥⲛⲏⲟⲩ (Phanisnēw)	Arabic: بانسناو, romanized: Banisnāw	ⲫⲁ- (possessive masculine article) + ⲛⲓ- ("plural definite article") + ⲥⲛⲏⲟⲩ ("brothers"), "the one of the brothers"
ⲡⲁⲛⲉϩⲁⲥ (Panehas)	Arabic: فينحاس, romanized: Finhās	Ancient Egyptian: pꜣ-nḥs, lit. 'the black'
ⲡⲁⲛⲓⲛⲉ (Panine)	Arabic: باننينا, romanized: Bānīnā	From ⲡⲁ- (possessive masculine article) + ⲛ- (genitive marker) + ⲉⲓⲛⲉ ("chain"), "the one of chain", "guardian"
ⲡⲁⲛⲓⲣⲁⲛ (Paniran)		ⲫⲁ- (possessive masculine article) + ⲛⲓ- ("plural definite article") + ⲣⲁⲛ ("names"), "the one of many names, honours"
ⲫⲁⲛⲟⲩⲃ (Phanoub)	Arabic: بانوب, romanized: Banūb	ⲫⲁ- (possessive masculine article) + ⲛⲟⲩⲃ ("gold"), "the one of gold"
ⲡⲁⲧⲁⲡⲓ (Patapi)	Arabic: بضابا, romanized: Biḍāba	Ancient Egyptian: pꜣ-dỉ-Ḥp, lit. 'given by the Apis/Nile'
ⲡⲁⲫⲛⲟⲩϯ (Paphnouti)	Arabic: ببنودة, romanized: Babnūda	Ancient Egyptian: pꜣy-pꜣ-ntr, lit. 'the one of the god'
ⲡⲁϣⲟⲛϯ (Pašonti)	Arabic: بشندي, romanized: Bašandi	ⲡⲁ- (possessive masculine article) + ϣⲟⲛϯ ("acacia tree"), "the one of acacia tree"
ⲡⲁϩⲱⲣ (Pahōr)	Arabic: باهور, romanized: Bahūr	Ancient Egyptian: pꜣ-ḥr, lit. 'the one of Horus'
ⲡⲁϧⲱⲙ (Pakhōm)	Arabic: باخوم, romanized: Bakhūm	Ancient Egyptian: pꜣ-ꜥẖm, lit. 'the one of the falcon'
ⲡⲉⲧⲉⲫⲣⲏ (Petephrē)	Arabic: بادبرا, romanized: Badabra	Ancient Egyptian: pꜣ-dj-pꜣ-rꜥ, lit. 'he whom Ra has given'
ⲡⲉϣⲟⲩⲣ (Pešour)/ ⲡⲓⲥⲟⲩⲣⲁ (Pisoura)	Arabic: بيسورا, romanized: Bisūra	Ancient Egyptian: pꜣ-ꜥswr, lit. 'the Assyrian'
ⲡⲓϣⲉⲛⲛⲟⲩϥⲓ (Pišennoufi)	Arabic: بشنونة, romanized: Bašnuna	ⲡⲓ- (definite masculine article) + ϣⲉⲛⲛⲟⲩϥⲓ ("good news"), "the good news, gospel", a calque of Greek "εὐαγγέλιον"
ⲫⲓⲃ (Phib)	Arabic: بيب, romanized: Bīb	Ancient Egyptian: pꜣ-hb, lit. 'the ibis'
ⲡⲓϣⲱⲓ (Pišōy)	Arabic: بيشوي, romanized: Bišūy, Arabic: ابشاي, romanized: Ibšāy	Ancient Egyptian: pꜣ-šꜣj, lit. 'the fate'
ⲡⲓϫⲓⲙⲓ (Pijimi)	Arabic: بيجيمي, romanized: Bijīmi	ⲡⲓ- (definite masculine article) + ϫⲓⲙⲓ ("finding, thing found")
ϩⲁⲣⲙⲓⲛⲏ (Harminē)	Arabic: هرمينا, romanized: Harmīna	Ancient Egyptian: Ḥr-Mn, lit. 'Horus-Min'
ϩⲉⲣⲟⲩⲱϫ (Herwōj)	Arabic: هرواج, romanized: Harwāj	Ancient Egyptian: ḥr-wḏꜣ, lit. 'healthy Horus'
ϫⲁⲙⲟⲩⲗ (Jamoul)	Arabic: جامول, romanized: Jamūl	"camel"
ϫⲓϭⲱⲓ (Jičōi)	Arabic: جيجوي, romanized: Jijūy	Ancient Egyptian: Ṯȝy-ḏy, lit. 'the bearer of the hairlock', an epithet of Harpocrates
ϫⲱⲣⲓ (Jōri)	Arabic: جورى, romanized: Jūri	"strong", the Arabic form Khuzi (خوزي) mentioned in the Synaxarium is a scribal mistake
ϣⲉⲛⲟⲩϯ (Šenouti)	Arabic: شِنُودة, romanized: Šinūda	ϣⲉ- ("son") + ⲛⲟⲩϯ ("god"), "son of god"
ϭⲓⲛⲟⲩⲥⲓ (Çinousi)	Arabic: شنوسي, romanized: Šinūsi	
Female names
ⲁⲥⲉⲛⲛⲉⲑ (Asenneth)	Arabic: اسنات, romanized: Asnāt	Ancient Egyptian: js.w-(n)-n(j)t, lit. 'belonging to Neth'
ⲗⲟⲩⲗⲉ (Loule)	Arabic: لولا, romanized: Lūla	"girl"
ⲙⲉⲛⲣⲓⲧ (Menrit)	Arabic: مريت, romanized: Mirrīt	"beloved"
ⲧⲁⲏⲥⲓ (Taisi)	Arabic: تاييس, romanized: Taīyis	Ancient Egyptian: ta-Ỉs.t, lit. 'the one of Isis'
ⲧⲁⲗⲟⲩϣⲏⲙ (Taloušēm)	Arabic: طالوشاط, romanized: Talušām, Arabic: ضالوشام, romanized: Ḏalušām	"the little maiden"
ⲧⲁⲥⲱⲛⲓ (Tasōni)	Arabic: تاسونى, romanized: Tasūni	From ⲧⲁ- (possessive feminine article) + ⲥⲱⲛⲓ ("sister"), "my sister"
ⲧⲁⲣⲟⲟⲩ (Taroow)	Arabic: دروى, romanized: Darwa	"burr, thistle"
ⲧⲉϭⲟϣⲉ (Teçoše)	Arabic: دجاشة, romanized: Dajāša	"Ethiopian"
ⲧϣⲉⲛⲟⲩϯ (Tšenouti)	Arabic: دشنودة, romanized: Dašanūda	ⲧϣⲉ- ("daughter") + ⲛⲟⲩϯ ("god"), "daughter of god"
ⲧⲁⲡϣⲁⲓ (Tapšay)	Arabic: دبشاية, romanized: Dabšāya	From ⲧⲁ- (possessive feminine article) + ⲡϣⲁⲓ ("the celebration, festival"), "the one of the celebration, festival"
ⲧⲁϩⲟⲩⲙⲓⲥⲓ (Thoumisi)	Arabic: دهميسة, romanized: Dahumīsa	From ⲧⲁ- (possessive feminine article) + ϩⲟⲩⲙⲓⲥⲓ ("birthday"), "the one of birthday"
ⲕⲟⲩⲗⲱϫⲉ (Koulōje)		Ancient Egyptian: ḳꜣlꜣwḏꜣ, lit. 'a whelp'
ⲑⲉⲗⲗⲱ (Thellō)	Arabic: تالا, romanized: Talā	"respectable", "honorable elder"
ϫⲉⲙⲙⲁϩⲱⲣ (Jemmahōr)		From ϫⲉⲙ- (possessive feminine article) + ⲁϩⲱⲣ ("treasures"), "finder of treasures"
ϣⲱϣⲉⲛ (Šōšen)		Ancient Egyptian: zšn, lit. 'lotus flower'

=== Greek and Latin ===
Coptic	Arabic	Translation
Male names
ⲁⲑⲁⲛⲁⲥⲓⲟⲥ	Arabic: أثناسيوس, romanized: Atnasiūs	Athanasius
ⲁⲗⲉⲝⲁⲛⲇⲣⲟⲥ	Arabic: ألكسندروس, romanized: Alaksandrūs	Alexander
ⲁⲛⲇⲣⲉⲁⲥ	Arabic: اندراوس, romanized: Andarāwus	Andrew
ⲃⲁⲥⲓⲗⲉⲓⲟⲥ	Arabic: باسليوس, romanized: Basalyūs	Basil
ⲃⲓⲕⲧⲱⲣ	Arabic: بقطر, romanized: Buqṭur	Victor
ⲅⲉⲱⲣⲅⲓⲟⲥ; ⲅⲉⲱⲣⲅⲓ	Arabic: جاورجيوس, romanized: Gawargiūs; Arabic: جرجس, romanized: Girgis; Arabic: جُرَيْجُ, romanized: Guraig	George
ⲉⲡⲓⲫⲁⲛⲓⲟⲥ	Arabic: أبفانيوس, romanized: Abifānius; Arabic: أبيبان, romanized: Abibān	Epiphanius
ⲉⲩⲇⲁⲓⲙⲱⲛ	Arabic: ودامون, romanized: Wadamūn	Eudaemon
ⲕⲩⲣⲓⲁⲕⲟⲥ	Arabic: قرياقوس, romanized: Qiryāqūs	Cyriacus
ⲕⲩⲣⲓⲗⲗⲟⲥ	Arabic: كيرلس, romanized: Kirūllus	Cyril
ⲕⲩⲣⲟⲥ	Arabic: كاراس, romanized: Kārās; Arabic: كاروس, romanized: Kārūs	Cyrus
ⲙⲁⲣⲕⲟⲥ	Arabic: مرقس, romanized: Murqus	Mark
ⲡⲁⲩⲗⲟⲥ	Arabic: بولس, romanized: Būlus	Paul
ⲡⲉⲧⲣⲟⲥ	Arabic: بطرس, romanized: Butrus	Peter
ⲑⲁⲗⲁⲥⲥⲓⲱⲛ	Arabic: لتصون, romanized: Latṣūn	"of the sea"
ⲑⲉⲟⲇⲱⲣⲁⲕⲏ	Arabic: تيودوراكي, romanized: Tiwudurāki	Theodorakios
ⲑⲉⲟⲇⲱⲣⲟⲥ	Arabic: تواضروس, romanized: Tawadrūs; Arabic: تادرس, romanized: Tādrus	Theodore
ⲥⲉⲩⲏⲣⲟⲥ	Arabic: ساويرس, romanized: Sawarīs	Severus
ⲫⲓⲗⲟⲡⲁⲧⲱⲣ	Arabic: فيلوباتير, romanized: Filubatīr	Philopator
Female names
ⲉⲩⲫⲣⲟⲥⲓⲛⲁ	Arabic: افروسينا, romanized: Afrūsīnā	"cheerful"
ⲇⲁⲙⲓⲁⲛⲏ	Arabic: دميانة, romanized: Damiāna	Demiana
ⲉⲓⲣⲏⲛⲏ	Arabic: إيريني, romanized: Irīnī, Arabic: إيراني, romanized: Irānī	Irene
ⲧⲁⲣⲭⲱⲛ	Arabic: دركن, romanized: Darkūn, Arabic: دركنة, romanized: Darkūna	"ruler, leader"
ⲧⲉⲩⲗⲟⲅⲓⲁ	Arabic: دولاجي, romanized: Dulāji	ⲧ- (definite feminine article) + Ancient Greek: εὐλογία, lit. 'blessing'
ⲕⲗⲉⲟⲡⲁⲧⲣⲁ	Arabic: كليوباترا, romanized: Kliubātra	Cleopatra
ⲑⲉⲕⲗⲁ	Arabic: تكله, romanized: Takla	Thecla
ⲣⲓⲯⲓⲙⲏ	Arabic: أربسيما, romanized: Arabsīma	Hripsime, Ancient Greek: Ριψιμιά
ϩⲏⲣⲁⲓⲥ	Arabic: هيرايسي, romanized: Hirāisi	Ancient Greek: Ἡραίς, lit. 'of Hera'
ⲑⲉⲟⲇⲱⲣⲁ	Arabic: ثيودورا, romanized: Thiūdūra	Theodora
ⲥⲩⲛⲕⲗⲏⲧⲓⲕⲏ	Arabic: سينكليتيكا, romanized: Sīnklītīka	Syncletica

=== Graeco-Egyptian ===
Coptic	Arabic	Translation
Male names
ⲁⲣⲡⲟⲕⲣⲁⲧⲱⲣ (Arpokratōr)	Arabic: اربقراطور, romanized: Arbuqrātūr	Harpocrates
ⲓⲥⲓⲇⲱⲣⲟⲥ (Isidōros)	Arabic: سيداروس, romanized: Sidārūs	Isidore
ⲫⲁⲛⲓⲕⲉⲣⲟⲥ/ⲡⲁⲛⲓⲕⲩⲣⲟⲥ(Phanikeros/Panikyros)	Arabic: بانيقاروس, romanized: Baniqārus	From ⲡⲁ- (possessive masculine article) + ⲛ- (genitive marker) + ⲕⲩⲣⲟⲥ ("Lord"), "the one of the Lord"
ⲫⲟⲓⲃⲁⲙⲙⲱⲛ (Phoibammōn)	Arabic: بيفام, romanized: Bifām	Φοῖβος (“Brilliant one, epithet of Apollo”) + Ἄμμων (“Amun”)
ⲡⲁⲧⲉⲣⲙⲟⲩⲑⲓⲟⲥ (Patermouthios)	Arabic: بدرمتاوش, romanized: Badarmutaūs	A Hellenisation of ⲡⲁⲧⲉⲣⲙⲟⲩⲧⲉ
ⲡⲉⲥⲩⲛⲑⲓⲟⲥ (Pesynthios)	Arabic: بسنده, romanized: Basanda	A Hellenisation of ⲡⲁϣⲟⲛϯ
ⲡⲥⲱⲧⲏⲣ (Psōtēr)	Arabic: ابصودار, romanized: Absudār	ⲡ- (definite masculine article) + Σωτήρ "saviour", an epithet of Christ
ⲥⲉⲛⲟⲩⲑⲓⲟⲥ (Senouthios)	Arabic: سنوتيوس, romanized: Sanutyūs	A Hellenisation of ϣⲉⲛⲟⲩϯ
ⲥⲁⲣⲁⲡⲁⲙⲱⲛ (Sarapamōn)	Arabic: سربام, romanized: Sarabām	Σέραπις (“Serapis”) + Ἄμμων (“Amun”)
ⲙⲏⲛⲁ (Mēna)	Arabic: مينا, romanized: Mīna	From Ancient Greek Μηνᾶς (Mēnâs) which comes from Demotic mnw (“the god Min”)

=== Semitic/Biblical ===
Coptic	Arabic	Translation
Male names
ⲁⲃⲣⲁϩⲁⲙ (Avraham)	Arabic: ابرام, romanized: Abrām, Arabic: إبراهيم, romanized: Ibrahīm	Abraham
ⲃⲉⲛⲓⲁⲙⲓⲛ (Veniamin)	Arabic: بنيامين, romanized: Binyamīn	Benjamin
ⲅⲁⲃⲣⲓⲏⲗ (Gavriēl)	Arabic: غبريال, romanized: G̣abriyāl	Gabriel
ⲇⲁⲩⲉⲓⲇ (Daueid)	Arabic: داويد, romanized: Dawīd, Arabic: داود, romanized: Dawūd	David
ⲉⲛⲱⲭ (Enōkh)	Arabic: اخنوخ, romanized: Akhnūkh	Enoch
ⲓⲱⲥⲏⲫ (Iōsēph)	Arabic: يوساب, romanized: Yusāb	Joseph
ⲓⲱϩⲁⲛⲛⲏⲥ (Iohannēs)	Arabic: يوحانس, romanized: Yuhānnis, Arabic: يحنس, romanized: Yahnis, Arabic: يوحنا, romanized: Yuhanna	John
ⲓⲥⲁⲁⲕ (Isaak)	Arabic: إسحاق, romanized: Ishāq	Isaac
ⲙⲓⲭⲁⲏⲗ (Mikhaēl)	Arabic: ميخاييل, romanized: Mikhayīl	Michael
ⲡⲁⲣⲥⲱⲙⲁ (Parsōma)	Arabic: برسوما, romanized: Barsūma; Arabic: برسوم, romanized: Barsūm	Classical Syriac: ܒܪܨܘܡܐ, romanized: Barsauma, lit. 'son of fasting'
ⲥⲉⲇⲣⲁⲕ (Sedrak)	Arabic: سدراك, romanized: Sidrāk	Sydrach
ⲥⲓⲥⲓⲛⲛⲓⲟⲥ (Sisinnios)	Arabic: سيسينيوس, romanized: Sisinyūs	From Syriac: sysnʾ, ultimately from Akkadian: sissinnu, lit. 'fruited date palm branch'
ⲍⲁⲭⲁⲣⲓⲁⲥ (Zakharias)	Arabic: زكريا, romanized: Zakarīyā	Zachary
Female names
ⲉⲗⲓⲥⲁⲃⲉⲧ (Elisavet)	Arabic: اليصابات, romanized: Alisabāt	Elisabeth
ⲙⲁⲣⲑⲁ (Martha)	Arabic: مرتا, romanized: Martā	Martha
ⲣⲉⲃⲉⲕⲕⲁ (Revekka)	Arabic: رفقة, romanized: Rifqa	Rebecca
ⲥⲟⲩⲥⲁⲛⲛⲁ (Sousanna)	Arabic: سوسنة, romanized: Susana	Susan

=== Arabic (Note: The Coptic version of the name is given if it is mentioned in literary sources) ===
Arabic	English	Coptic	Translation
Male names
نجيب	Naguib		"extraordinary"
فريد	Farid		"unique"
فادي	Fadi		"redeemer, saviour"
رامي	Rami		"archer"
ثروت	Tharwat		"treasure"
عبد المسيح	Abd el-Masih	ⲁⲡⲧⲏⲗⲙⲉⲥⲏϩ (Aptēlmesēh)	"slave of the Messiah"
لبيب	Labib	ⲗⲁⲃⲓⲃ (Labib)	"wise"
سيدهم	Sidhom	ⲥⲓⲇϩⲟⲙ (Sidhom)	"their Lord"
ميلاد	Milad		"birth", "Christmas"
رمزي	Ramzi		"iconic"
كامل	Kamal		"perfect, genuine"
صليب	Salib	ⲥⲁⲗⲉⲡ (Salep)	"cross"
باسم	Basem	ⲃⲁⲥⲓⲙⲟⲥ (Basimos)	"smiling"
حديد	Hadid	ϩⲁⲇⲓⲇ (Hadid)	"iron"
حبيب	Habib	ϩⲁⲡⲓⲡ (Hapip), ⲁⲃⲓⲃⲟ (Abibo)	"beloved"
عبد الله	Abdulla	ⲁⲃⲇⲉⲗⲗⲁ (Abdella), ⲃⲓⲕⲟⲩⲗⲗⲁ (Bikoulla), a Copto-Arabic hybrid, where Arabic "abd" is replaced with "ⲃⲱⲕ" "servant"	"servant of God"
Female names
ماجدة	Majda		"glorious"

=== Christian concepts ===
Some of the modern Coptic Arabic names are translation of Christian names and concepts from Coptic and Greek:

Arabic translation	Coptic/Greek name	Meaning
Salah (صلاح)	Αγαθόν (Agathon)	"good"
Atallah (عطاالله)	Θεόδωρος (Theodoros)	"given by God"
Abd al-Mashih (عبد المسيح)	ⲭⲣⲓⲥⲧⲟⲇⲟⲩⲗⲟⲥ (Khristodulos)	"servant to the Messiah (Christ)"
Sadiq (صديق)	ⲡⲓⲑⲙⲏⲓ (Pithmei)	"true, righteous"
Sami (سامي)	ⲡⲓϣⲱⲓ (Pišōy)	“high, exalted”
Habib (حبيب)	ⲙⲉⲛⲣⲓⲧ (Menrit)	"beloved"
Eid (عيد)	ⲡⲓϣⲁⲓ (Pišai)	"feast, holiday"
Fadi (فادي)	ⲡⲥⲱⲧⲏⲣ (Psōtēr)	"saviour"
Ḥikma (حكمة)	ⲥⲟⲫⲓⲁ (Sophia)	"wisdom"
Iman (إيمان)	ⲡⲓⲥⲧⲓⲥ (Pistis)	"faith"
Bishara (بشارة)	ⲡⲓϣⲉⲛⲛⲟⲩϥⲓ (Pišennoufi)	"good news", "Annunciation"
Salib (صليب)	ⲡⲓⲥⲧⲁⲩⲣⲟⲥ (Pistauros)	"cross"

=== Diminutives and short forms ===
Diminutives and shortened forms are created by either removing one or more syllables from the beginning or end of the original first name to create a familiar or affectionate variation that is often used in casual or close relationships.

Examples:
Name	Diminutive
ⲁⲑⲁⲛⲁⲥⲓⲟⲥ	ⲁⲑⲁ, ⲁⲑⲁⲛ, ⲁⲑⲁⲥ
ⲑⲉⲟⲇⲱⲣⲟⲥ	ⲧⲉϫⲓ (Arabic: داجى, romanized: Dāji), ⲑⲱⲧⲣⲓ, ⲇⲱⲣⲉ
ⲁⲗⲉⲝⲁⲛⲇⲣⲟⲥ	ⲁⲗⲉⲝ, ⲁⲗⲝⲁⲓ
ⲧⲓⲙⲟⲑⲉⲟⲥ	ϯⲙⲱ
ⲕⲩⲣⲟⲥ	ⲕⲩⲣⲓ
ⲡⲁⲩⲗⲟⲥ	ⲡⲁⲩⲗⲉ
ⲉⲡⲓⲫⲁⲛⲓⲟⲥ	ⲫⲁⲛⲓⲟⲥ (Arabic: بنايوس, romanized: Banayūs), ⲡⲉⲫⲁⲛⲏ (Arabic: بفان, romanized: Befān)
ⲥⲧⲉⲫⲁⲛⲟⲥ	ⲡⲫⲁⲛⲟⲥ (Arabic: فانوس, romanized: Fanūs)
ⲕⲗⲁⲩⲇⲓⲟⲥ	ⲕⲗⲟⲧⲓ
ⲕⲗⲉⲟⲡⲁⲧⲣⲁ	ⲕⲗⲉⲱⲡⲁ

=== Compound names ===
Coptic has a number of compound names, made by combining ⲁⲡⲁ, a Coptic rendering of the Greek word ἀββα (abba, “abba, father”), with a personal name of a saint or a martyr, whose honorific title "abba" became a part of his name (i.e. St. Abadir, St. Abamun, St. Abanub).

Coptic	Arabic	Translation
Male names
ⲁⲡⲁⲕⲩⲣⲓ (Apakyri)	Arabic: اباكير, romanized: Abakīr	A combination of ⲁⲡⲁ and a personal name ⲕⲩⲣⲓ
ⲁⲡⲁⲙⲟⲩⲛ (Apamoun)	Arabic: ابامون, romanized: Abamūn	A combination of ⲁⲡⲁ and a personal name ⲁⲙⲟⲩⲛ
ⲁⲡⲁⲛⲟⲩⲃ (Apanoub)	Arabic: ابانوب, romanized: Abanūb	A combination of ⲁⲡⲁ and a personal name ⲁⲛⲟⲩⲃ
ⲁⲡⲁⲥⲭⲩⲣⲟⲛ (Apaskhyron)	Arabic: أباسخيرون, romanized: Abaskhirūn	A combination of ⲁⲡⲁ and a personal name ⲓⲥⲭⲩⲣⲱⲛ
ⲁⲡⲁⲧⲓⲗ (Apatil)	Arabic: اباتيل, romanized: Abatīl	A combination of ⲁⲡⲁ and a personal name ⲧⲓⲗ
ⲁⲡⲁⲧⲏⲣ (Apatēr)	Arabic: ابادير, romanized: Abadīr	A combination of ⲁⲡⲁ and a personal name ⲧⲏⲣ

=== European forms ===
In recent years the original Coptic forms of the names get replaced with European ones, mostly from English, French and German, e.g. Maurice (Arabic: موريس, Coptic: ⲙⲱⲣⲓⲥ, ⲙⲁⲩⲣⲏⲥ) replaced the native Maurikios (Coptic: ⲙⲁⲩⲣⲓⲕⲓⲟⲥ, Arabic: موريكيوس) and George (Arabic: جورج) replaced Georgios (Coptic: ⲅⲉⲱⲣⲅⲓⲟⲥ, Arabic: جرجس, romanized: Girgis).

With the rise of Egyptology in the 19th and the first half of the 20th century, Ancient Egyptian names, often adopted from Ancient Greek "Egyptological" forms, gained prominence among the Coptic community, i.e. Ramesses or Ramsis (compare to Coptic: ⲣⲁⲙⲁⲥⲥⲏ, romanized: Ramassē, a form attested in the Bible), Amasis, Sesostris, Narmer.

== Second names and surnames ==
The concept of second name and a surname wasn't developed in Classical Coptic, although epithets and nicknames were used to distinguish people, such as:

ⲁⲙⲉ "herd, pastor", ⲙⲁⲣⲏⲥ "Southener", ⲡⲉⲃⲱ "dumb", ⲡⲕⲱϩⲧ "fire", ⲡⲟⲩⲱⲛϣ "the wolf", ⲡⲓⲭⲁⲙⲉ "the black", ⲡⲓϧⲉⲙⲥ "ear of corn", ⲡⲉϭⲱϣ "Ethiopian, black", ⲡϭⲏϫⲉ "purple", ⲱ "great", ϣⲏⲙ "small", ⲗⲁⲙⲡⲟⲩⲥ (Gr.) "bright, shining", ⲧⲭⲉϩⲗⲓ (Ar.) "of the elders", ⲡⲓⲥⲧⲁⲩⲣⲟⲥ (Arabic: بسطاوروس, romanized: Bastawrus) "the cross".

=== Demonyms ===
Demonyms are based on the place of origin, formed by either using a prefix ⲡⲓⲣⲉⲙ- ("the man of") and its female equivalent ϯⲣⲉⲙ- or by using possessive article ⲡⲁ- and its feminine parallel ⲧⲁ- "the one of" (typical to Middle Egypt):

Masculine: ⲡⲓⲣⲉⲙⲣⲁⲕⲟϯ (pi-Remrakoti) "from Alexandria", ⲡⲓⲣⲉⲙⲡⲟⲩⲥⲓⲣⲓ (pi-Rempousiri) "from Pousiri", ⲡⲁⲛⲉ (Pane) "from Thebes", ⲡⲣⲟⲙⲉⲛⲉⲥⲓⲛⲁ (p-Romenesina) "from Sinai";

Feminine: ⲧⲁⲡⲓⲁⲙ (Tapiam) "from Faiyum", ⲧⲣⲟⲙⲡⲁⲃⲁⲓⲧ (t-Rompabait) "from Behbeit", etc.

=== Patronymics ===
The patronymics, like in many other languages, Coptic uses patronymics to establish lineage, differentiate individuals and provide practical identification within certain cultures by incorporating the father's name into a person's own name. In Coptic it is achieved by adding prefix ⲡϣⲉⲛ- (or its forms ⲡⲥⲉⲛ-/ⲯⲉⲛ-), "the son of" or ⲧϣⲉⲛ- (or its forms ⲧⲥⲉⲛ-/ϫⲉⲛ-) "the daughter of" to a father's name. Additionally, ⲡϣⲏ is used to translate Arabic patronymic (Arabic: ابن, romanized: ibn, lit. 'son of'). So if someones name is Tawadrus ibn Mīnā in Arabic, it would be Theodoros pshe Mena (ⲑⲉⲟⲇⲱⲣⲟⲥ ⲡϣⲏ ⲙⲏⲛⲁ) in Coptic.
