= Feroz Abbasi =

Guantanamo Bay detainee

- Born: 1979 (age 46–47); Entebbe, Uganda
- Known for: Being one of nine British men held in extrajudicial detention in the United States Guantanamo Bay detainment camps, in Cuba

Feroz Abbasi (born 1979) is one of nine British men who were held in extrajudicial detention in the United States Guantanamo Bay detainment camps, in Cuba. He was released from detention and repatriated in 2005 and released by the British government the next day.

He was born in Entebbe, Uganda, to a Pakistani father and a Ugandan Nubian mother before his family moved to the United Kingdom, where he was raised.

== Allegations and internment ==
Abbasi was born in 1979 in Entebbe, Uganda to a Pakistani father and a Nubian mother (her Grandfather was from South Sudan) later immigrated to the United Kingdom. The U.S. government alleged that Abbasi attended four separate al-Qaeda training courses at the Al Farouq training camp, near Kandahar, and also at the nearby camp, Ubaida. He was taught urban warfare, assassination techniques, intelligence collection and surveillance. They allege that he volunteered to participate in suicide operations and met Osama bin Laden, the founder and leader of al-Qaeda, three times. However, this theory was later dismissed as Abbasi would have been too young and there was no evidence to back this. He was alleged to have fought with al-Qaeda and the Taliban against American and coalition forces in Afghanistan. When he was captured by the Afghan Northern Alliance, they claim he had hand grenades strapped to his legs and was carrying a military radio. He was handed over to U.S. forces. They referred to him as "the SAS guy" to his extensive training, and shipped him to the Guantanamo Bay detention camp.

His mother and his lawyers argued that Abbasi was one of a small group of idealistic young Muslim men who found themselves caught in the wrong place at the wrong time. She said she was worried for his mental welfare as he was barely 18.

The British Court of Appeal said it found his detention at Guantanamo "legally objectionable", but stopped short of forcing the government to intervene on his behalf. The U.S. government announced that Abbasi would be one of the prisoners facing charges before a military tribunal, although it was announced that he would not face the death penalty if convicted as he was a first time offender and the case was not strong enough to pursue this type of punishment. This case was also dismissed on the grounds of lack of evidence and no hard evidence from the U.S. government to back the allegations that were made. Subsequently, Abbasi proceeded to sue the U.S. government, stating in an interview that "they had made his life hell" and left him with everlasting mental issues. Abbasi won the tribunal against the U.S. government and was compensated £3.5 million as a result of this.

After Abbasi's release, American authorities released to the BBC further details of their allegations, as well as a statement allegedly written by Abbasi which, they claimed, was a handwritten autobiography written whilst in detention. The document allegedly describes his anguish and low self-esteem before he left England and outlines how a jihad group works and describes his training and use of weapons. But, Abbasi's lawyer confirmed Abbasi's claims to have been tortured, and as a result, the statement was legally worthless as evidence.

== Release ==
His mother, his Member of Parliament (MP) Geraint Davies, and human rights lawyers and organisations worked against the US internment and military tribunal process. They also called on the British government to put greater pressure on their US counterparts to improve the tribunal process, detention conditions, and access for the family and lawyers. The British government pressured the US to release its citizens, reportedly leading to a rift between the two countries.

British Foreign Secretary Jack Straw announced that the remaining Britons in Guantanamo Bay who were originally with Feroz Abbasi, would be returned to Britain "within weeks" after "intensive and complex discussions" with the US government. Although they were still regarded as "enemy combatants" by the US government, no charges have ever been brought against any of them.

On 25 January 2005, the remaining Britons were flown back to the United Kingdom by an RAF aircraft. On arrival they were arrested by officers from the Metropolitan Police and taken to Paddington Green Police Station for questioning under the Terrorism Act 2000. By 9pm the next day, 26 January, all four had been released without charge.

The BBC learned that Abbasi and Martin Mubanga had received letters from the British government telling them that they would not be allowed passports. Using the Royal Prerogative for the first time since 1976, the government withdrew the passports for the time being due to evidence gathered against them by the US. The British government suggested they were likely to take part in action against UK or allied targets if they left Britain. It was unclear whether the evidence was gathered in Guantanamo, where their lawyer has alleged Abbasi and Mubanga suffered torture, or whether this measure was part of the conditions agreed with the US government for their release. Abbasi later won his appeal to gain his passport back as he was no longer deemed a threat.

== Transcripts from hearing ==
Following a Freedom of Information Act request from the Associated Press, 5000 pages of information were released containing the names and home countries of many detainees in Guantanamo Bay. Amongst this documentation is a transcript of the hearing at which Feroz Abbasi was present. Mr. Abbasi's session, begins on page one of this PDF file.

Feroz Abbasi asked: "May I have my legal representative present please?"

The tribunal president, a USAF colonel (whose name has been blacked out in the document) replied: "No you may not. This is not a legal proceeding. It is a military tribunal."

Feroz Abbasi continued: "On the basis that the tribunal can actually hold me here in incarceration or release me, I would consider this a criminal proceeding."

Feroz Abbasi (reading):

AKA Malcolm X. I am not anti-American and I did not come here to condemn America. I want to make that very clear. I came here to tell the truth and if the truth condemns America, then she stands condemned...(inaudible) The sun rising is splendour. A notice. It is my duty as a Muslim to warn all who are involved in this matter that they are personally responsible for their actions at all times before Allah. Allah says in this uncreated word that is the Koran. Is the man who believes no better than the man who is rebellious and wicked? Not equal are they. For those who believe and do righteous deeds are gardeners as hospitable homes for their good deeds. As to those who are rebellious or wicked their abode will be the fire. Every time they wish to get away from there they will be forced there into and it will be said to them, Take ye the penalty of the fire which ye will want to reject as false. And indeed we will make them taste of the penalty of this life prior to the supreme penalty in order that they may repent and return. And who does more wrong than one to whom are recited the signs of his lord and who turns away there from. Vary from those who transgress we will exact due retribution. Chapter 32 Al Sajdah, verses 18–22.

Abbasi continues quoting from the Koran.

The president says he: "appreciates your concern for our souls".

Following Abbasi's concerns about his classification from the point of Islamic law, the tribunal president states: "This is not Islamic law. It has no authority here."

Abbasi then repeatedly brings up his status under international law. The tribunal president says:

"International law does not apply. Geneva Conventions do not apply. You have been designated an enemy combatant. This Tribunal will fairly listen to your explanation of your actions."

After repeated references to international law by Abbasi, the tribunal president states:

"I don't care about international law. I don't want to hear the word international law again."

Abbasi also asked to be treated as a prisoner of war and declared he would be humbled to be regarded as a combatant, stating:

"Do not be fooled into thinking I am in any way perturbed by you classifying me as a (nonsensical) 'enemy combatant'. In fact quite to the contrary I am humbled that Allah would honour me so."

Abbasi admitted attending an al-Qaeda training camp visited by Osama Bin Laden:

"Yes, I was present at the very speech when with his own mouth and tongue he told Basic Training that he had received a fax from the Americans!".

== Press reports ==
The American magazine Mother Jones provided excerpts from the transcripts of a selection of the Guantanamo detainees. Abbasi was one of the detainees profiled.

According to the article, his transcript contained the following exchange:

Abbasi: So, you are telling me I am an enemy combatant. I am telling you by special Geneva Conventions, I am a non-combatant….

Tribunal president: Once again, international law does not matter here. Geneva Convention does not matter here. What matters here and I am concerned about and what I really want to get to is your status as enemy combatant based upon the evidence that has been provided and your actions while you were in Afghanistan. If you deviate from that one more time you will be removed from this tribunal and we will continue to hear evidence without you being present….

Abbasi: I know, but I have the right to speak….

Tribunal president: No, you don’t.

Abbasi: And the personal representative told me I can say whatever I like.

Tribunal president: He was mistaken if he told you that….

[Abbasi continues to speak at length.]

Tribunal president:Once again…international law…. [Abbasi interrupts.] Mr. Abbasi, your conduct is unacceptable and this is your absolute final warning. I don't care about international law. I don’t want to hear the words "international law" again. We are not concerned with international law.

== Interview ==
In January 2012, Abbasi talked to The Observer about his life since his release. He was finding it difficult to get back to ordinary life.
