= Ubeidiya =

Ubeidiya commonly refers to:

== Places ==
=== Jordan Valley ===
- Ubeidiya, Tiberias, a tell and former village
- Ubeidiya prehistoric site, a nearby archaeological site

=== Judaean Mountains ===
- Ubeidiya, West Bank, a Palestinian town

== See also ==
- Abd (Arabic), the root ('abd) of the word family to which 'ubeidiya belongs, with links to other derivates
- Obadiah (disambiguation)
- Abadiyeh (disambiguation)
- Al-Ubaid (disambiguation)
