= Proto-Gnosticism =

Precursors to Gnosticism

Proto-Gnosticism or pre-Gnosticism refers to movements similar to Gnosticism during the first century of Christianity. Proto-Gnostics did not have the same full-fledged theology as the later Gnostics, but did prefigure some of their views. There is, however, some debate regarding the existence of proto-Gnosticism in the first century.

== New Testament ==
Some believe that the opponents mentioned in 1 John, Jude and 1-2 Corinthians are proto-Gnostics or partly proto-Gnostic. According to some the Corinthian church that was criticized by Paul the Apostle and which existed in the time of Paul included proto-Gnostic beliefs.

== Possible identifications with proto-Gnosticism ==
- Maghāriya were a minor Jewish sect that appeared in the first century BCE, their special practice was the keeping of all their literature in caves in the surrounding hills of Israel. They made their own commentaries on the Bible and the law. The Maghāriya believed that God is too sublime to mingle with matter, thus they did not believe that God directly created the world, but that an angel, which represents God created the earth which is similar to the Mandaean demiurgic Ptahil. Some scholars have identified the Maghāriya with the Essenes or the Therapeutae.
- Philo of Alexandria: Some have argued that Philo of Alexandria held a few proto-Gnostic views, because he seems to see knowledge as something in opposition to the flesh, however modern scholarship has criticized the claim.
- Odes of Solomon: though most scholars believe the book to be written by a Christian influenced by the Qumran community, a minority have argued that the book has Gnostic views, such as James White.
- Some scholars have noted some similarities with the Ascension of Isaiah and Gnostic beliefs.
- Thomasines: Some have claimed that the Thomasines were proto-Gnostic, but it is disputed by some scholars.
- Slavonic Enoch: the book of 2 Enoch possibly has proto-Gnostic elements.
- Gospel of Mary: The Gospel of Mary can perhaps be identified with proto-Gnosticism.
