= Thomasines =

Early Syrian Christian group

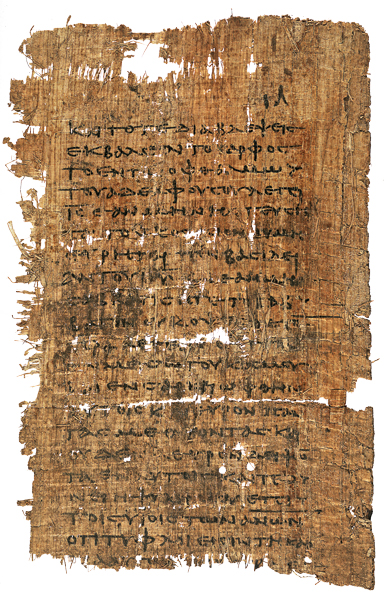
- Papyrus Oxyrhynchus 1, a fragment of Gospel of Thomas.
- Classification: Abrahamic
- Scripture: Gospel of Thomas; Acts of Thomas (speculated)
- Theology: Monotheistic
- Associations: Early Christianity (Ante-Nicene period)
- Region: Syria, Palestine, probably Jordan
- Language: Syriac, Koine Greek
- Origin: Possibly 1st century AD; Roman Empire
- Absorbed: by Proto-orthodox Christian Church and Gnostic Naassenes, around 4th century

Thomasine is a name given to a Syrian Christian group that originated in the first or the second century, who especially revered the apostle Thomas and some scholars speculate to have written the gospel of Thomas. They did not refer to their writing on the life of Jesus as an "εὐαγγέλιον" (euangélion); rather they seem to have preferred the word logia, meaning a book of sayings, as the genre of their work, which makes their approach different from the other early Christian authors. The group was said to have held esoteric, mystical, and ascetic ideas. Some have associated them with the Proto-Gnostics. However modern critics have disputed their affiliation with Gnosticism, especially because they lack many uniquely Gnostic beliefs.

== History ==
According to one view the Thomasines were an early group that questioned the authority of the Jerusalem church and the apostle James, with the Thomasine church beginning around the middle of the first century in Syria.

Elaine Pagels dates the Thomasine community to around the time of the Gospel of John’s compilation (AD 70–110), and contends that the Gospel of John appears to contain "anti-Thomasine" elements and that the Johannine community may have splintered off from the same group, although in the 21st century there has been increasing skepticism of the existence of a separate Johannine community. Most scholars date Thomas to the second century, after the composition of the canonical gospels.

== Community ==
The Thomasine communities had leaders who through social rules, attempted to manage the process by which new proselytes could come in. They minimized the importance of money and were not expected to have any extra income from what they did not give away. The community had a social attitude of "diligence", where the leader of the community demonstrates a consistent structure for community activities, including labor. The Thomasines likely had a form of baptism.

== Beliefs ==
=== Soteriology ===
In Thomasine belief, Jesus was referred to as "the Light" who ascended to the "place of light". Followers were encouraged to pursue a path toward said light through mystical ascent. The Thomasines identified themselves as "children of the light", contrasting this with those not part of the elect community, who were considered "sons of darkness". The Thomasines believed in predestination, viewing themselves as elect because they were born from the light.

The Gospel of Thomas says to keep the Sabbath to be saved. However, it is likely a metaphor for internalized rest. The Thomasines were also said to have had semi-ascetic ideas.

=== Eschatology ===
In Thomasine theology, the pursuit of light is associated with a journey that culminates in "rest." The choice to follow Jesus is considered significant, as judgment is perceived to be ongoing in the world, and there is a notion that the universe may conclude at any moment.

=== Christology ===
The Gospel of Thomas refers to Jesus as the "son of man" and affirms his lordship. For the Thomasines, Jesus is considered a figure whose nature resists simple categorization or description. However, certain passages in the Gospel of Thomas may suggest aspects of divine characteristics attributed to Jesus.

=== Possible Gnosticism ===
Many scholars historically linked the Gospel of Thomas to Gnosticism, but contemporary research has questioned this relationship. Many scholars contend that the Gospel of Thomas reflects a Gnostic worldview; however, many others dispute its Gnostic affiliations, noting that it does not align with the Gnostic mythology described by Irenaeus. Additionally, the form of mysticism present in the Gospel of Thomas lacks several elements typically associated with Gnosticism. The Gospel of Thomas suggests that living a physical life is important, which seems to go against some beliefs commonly held by Gnostic groups. Paterson Brown used this idea to argue that the Gospel of Thomas is not a Gnostic text. According to David W. Kim, the modern association of the Thomasines with Gnosticism is too anachronistic and the Thomasine sect seems to predate the Gnostic movements.

According to Andrew Phillip, the Thomasines did not adhere to a form of Gnosticism, but they still held to strongly esoteric views with apparent Platonic influence. A. F. J. Klijn argued that the Thomasine canon can be linked to the early history of Syriac Christianity, giving it historical significance; although he titled his anthology of Gnostic scriptures The School of St. Thomas, he acknowledged that the Thomasine literature is not particularly Gnostic, he noted that it shares many of its central values and themes with other early Christian texts typically associated with different apostolic figures.

== Dissolution and Transformation ==
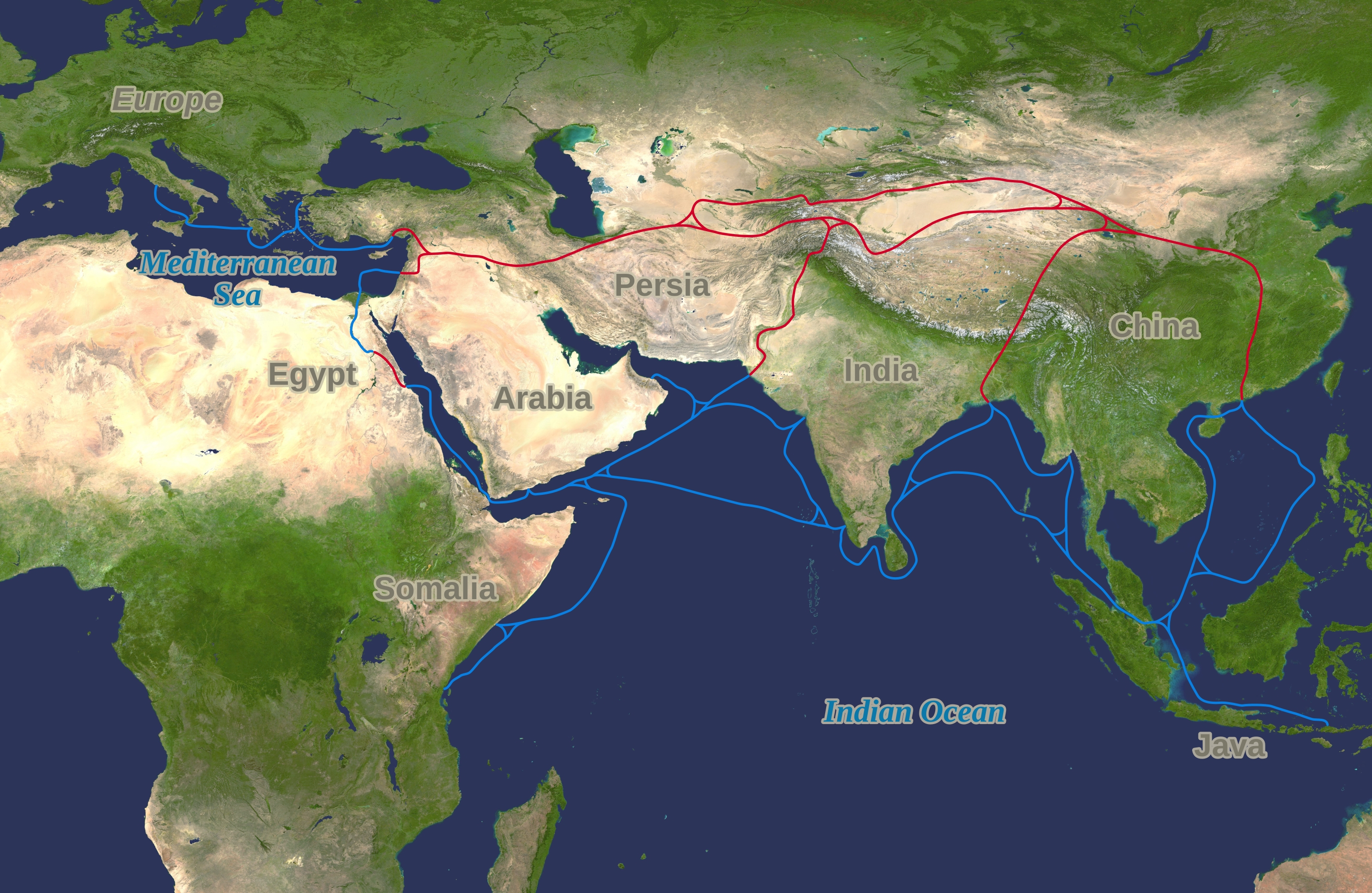
Map of ancient Silk Road and Spice Route

During 2nd century the Proto-orthodox Christian Church seem to have adopted Diatessaron, compiled between 160 and 175 AD, which excluded all works of Thomasine authorship. Irenaeus of Lyons wrote in the late 2nd century that: "since there are four-quarters of the earth [...] it is fitting that the church should have four pillars [...] the four Gospels." and then shortly thereafter made the first known quotation from a fourth gospel – the now-canonical version of the Gospel of John. The late 2nd-century Muratorian fragment also recognizes only the three synoptic gospels and John.

Bible scholar Bruce Metzger wrote regarding the formation of the New Testament canon:

Although the fringes of the emerging canon remained unsettled for generations, a high degree of unanimity concerning the greater part of the New Testament was attained among the very diverse and scattered congregations of believers not only throughout the Mediterranean world, but also over an area extending from Britain to Mesopotamia.

Hippolytus of Rome rejected Thomasine writings, associating the community with the Proto-Gnostic movement of Naassenes, Around 4th century Cyril of Jerusalem rejected Thomasine writings and stated that they have been used by the Manicheans, which signifies that by the time a part of Thomasines had been absorbed by Gnostic groups and consequentially dissolved.

Thomasine community however can be regarded as a foundational community for the Syriac Christianity, as in they have laid the foundation of the Christianity in the region and while their successors have been absorbed into the Gnostic milieu, the foundational Thomasine community cannot be fully considered a Gnostic community and rather they were an early Christian community, although this is still debated. Saint Thomas Christians are speculated to be a descendant group of Thomasines that eventually accepted core proto-orthodox beliefs. A plausible theory is that the arrival of Syrian merchants in the late 4th century brought the Thomas tradition with them, with the preexisting Syrian tradition that Thomas ministered in India, coupled with the fact that the earliest archaeological evidence of Indian Christianity dated at 372 CE, it is feasible that Syria’s Thomasine immigrants brought the tradition with them early in antiquity; Correlations between the apocryphal Acts of Thomas and archaeological evidence have led some scholars to place Thomas in Northern India sometime in the middle of the 1st century, others argue for his arrival in South India in 52 CE, based upon oral tradition, songs, sacred places, and knowledge of Rome's trading relationship during the 1st century but regardless of how it arrived, Christianity itself had a foothold in the subcontinent well before the arrival of colonialism and evidence suggests that the Thomas mythos was there as well.
