= Abd Rabbo =

Abd Rabbo (Arabic: عبد ربه) is a masculine given name and surname of Arabic origin. Notable people with the name include:

== Given name ==
- Abed Rabah (born 1975), Israeli footballer
- Abd Rabbuh Mansur Al-Hadi (1945–2026), Yemeni politician
- Abd Rabbo Hussein (died 2016), Yemeni Army general

== Surname ==
- Hosny Abd Rabo (born 1984), Egyptian footballer
- Ibn ʿAbd Rabbih (860–940), Moorish writer and poet
- Yasser Abed Rabbo (born 1944), Palestinian politician

== See also ==
- Abd Rabbo family incident, violent incident in 2009
