= Abdul Masih =

Abdul Masih or Abdelmassih (Arabic: عبد المسيح, romanized: ʻAbd al-Masīḥ, lit. 'servant of the Messiah') is a male given name or surname used by Arab Christians. It may refer to the following notable people:

- Abd al-Masih ibn Ishaq al-Kindi, author of the medieval dialogue Apology of al-Kindy
- Abd al-Masih (martyr) (died 390), Syrian Christian saint
- Abd al-Masih (martyr), also called Qays al-Ghassani, (died 9th century), Eastern Orthodox saint
- Ignatius Abdulmasih I (1662–1686), Syriac Orthodox patriarch of Antioch
- Abdul Masih (missionary) (1776–1827), Indian Christian missionary
- Abd al-Masih Salib al-Masudi (1848–1935), Egyptian monk and author
- Ignatius Abd al-Masih II, (1854–1915), Syriac Orthodox Patriarch of Antioch, 1895–1903
- Abd al-Masih al-Antaki (1874–1923), Syrian intellectual and journalist
- Abd al-Masih Haddad (1890–1963), Syrian writer of the Mahjar movement and journalist
- Abdel Messih El-Makari (1892–1963), Egyptian Coptic Orthodox monk and priest
- Halim Abdul Messieh El-Dabh (1921–2017), Egyptian-American musician
- Roger Abdelmassih (born 1943), Brazilian physician
