= Abd Rabbo family incident =

2009 extrajudicial killing by Israeli military

- Location: 31°31′6.48″N 34°30′10.80″E; Jabalia
- Date: January 7, 2009
- Deaths: 2
- Injuries: 2
- Victims: 4
- Perpetrator: Israel Defense Forces

On January 7, 2009, Israeli soldiers killed members of the Abd Rabbo family (Arabic: عبد ربه) who were emerging from the house, a locus of reported rocket launches by Hamas. The incident was detailed by several news agencies, human-rights organizations and the Goldstone report.

== Background ==
According to the account provided to official Palestinian Authority daily newspaper Al-Hayat al-Jadida by family members in late January 2009, they live on the hill that overlooks Israeli town Sderot. They told that for years Hamas had used their property and homes as military installations from which the group had launched rockets into Israel. They said that those who tried to object were shot in the legs by Hamas operatives. They added that following the war end, they were waiting for the aid promised by Hamas authorities after Israel "bombed the farm and turned it into ruins". They emphasized to the paper that they were not Hamas activists and that they were still loyal to the Fatah movement.

== Shooting ==
According to the early account provided to the Middle East newspaper Asharq Al-Awsat by family members,

We decided, my wife and I and my 3 kids, after Israel announced cease fire (Tahadia) for 3 hours, to leave the house specially for food and water ... We were about to step out, and our children were ahead of us, and the soldiers of the occupation met us with live bullets while we were stepping over the threshold of our house, and they killed two of my daughters, and the third of them was severally wounded ... [E]lderly mother, 65 years old, could not bear to see that, and she burst and led us outside of the house, carrying a white flag, positive that her old age would make my wife and I not targeted by the occupation [forces]. But only when she got close to the three girls who were on the floor, drowned in their own blood, and a soldier shot and wounded her foot and she also drowned in her blood side to side of the three girls.

Later accounts, published in many Western news outlets, describe the occurrence as one of the white flags incidents, in which Israeli soldiers shot at family members, killing two of the daughters and critically wounding the third one, as the family waved white flags in an attempt to leave the premises after receiving orders to do so by IDF. The members of the family and most residents of the neighborhood claim there were no Hamas fighters in the area at the time of the alleged incident. However, the Time magazine reporter alleges that one middle-aged farmer told him "in a near whisper" that Hamas had been firing rockets from the vicinity of where the episode took place.

== Investigations ==
The incident was described in details in the Amnesty International report issued in July 2009. Family members testified that on January 7, the shelling around the house increased and around 12:50 pm they were ordered to leave their house by the Israeli soldiers. Khaled Abd Rabbo told Amnesty representatives:

My wife and our three daughters (Amal, two, Samar, four, and Souad, seven), my mother, (Souad, aged 54) and I went out. My mother was holding a white cloth tied to a broom handle and we were holding white cloths. ... Outside there was a tank parked about 10m from the front door of our house, in our garden, which by then had been destroyed ... We stood still outside the door waiting for the soldiers to tell us or signal to us what to do next. Two soldiers stood outside the tank in our garden, eating chips and chocolate and ignored us. We stood still for several minutes. Then suddenly a soldier emerged from the middle of the tank. He was out of the tank from the waist up, and he took aim at us and shot many bullets. My daughter Amal had nine bullets in the chest area. She was holding a teddy bear against her chest and it got ripped by the bullets, my daughter Souad got some 11 or 12 bullets also in the chest area, and my daughter Samar got several bullets in the chest and tummy, and my mother was shot ...

The incident was the leading case reported in the Human Rights Watch's "White Flag Deaths" report. HRW states that all available evidence indicates that Israeli forces were in control of the area in question, no fighting was taking place there at the time, and no Palestinian forces were hiding among the civilians or using them as human shields. Neighborhood residents who spoke to HRW said that major fighting in the area had stopped by the morning of January 7, although sporadic exchanges of fire may have continued after that. According to family members' testimony, around noon the family heard the tank outside their house and then a soldier on a megaphone calling on them to come outside; afraid to send out any men, two women and three female children gathered at the door, at least three of them holding pieces of white cloth. Khaled's mother Su’ad explained HRW what happened next:

We were with the white flags in order to make them see that we were civilians. We spent seven to nine minutes waving the flags and our faces were looking at them. And suddenly they opened fire and the girls fell to the ground. Su’ad fell and when I saw her I turned to my right and when I turned I got hit ... The shooting came from where the tank was but I don't know who shot. Su’ad was wounded in the neck and chest. Amal was hit in the chest and abdomen and her intestines came out. Su’ad died immediately ...

Interviewed separately by HRW, Khaled Abd Rabbo and his brother, who had both remained inside the house, confirmed this version of events. According to Khaled, the women and girls were outside for about five minutes when an Israeli soldier emerged from the top of the tank and without warning opened fire with automatic gunfire. HRW concluded that ballistic evidence found at the scene, medical records of the victims, and examinations by foreign doctors of the two wounded survivors corroborate the witnesses' account.

Pro-Israeli NGOs CAMERA and Monitor found contradictions between the testimonies of the family members that appear in HRW report and the versions of the incident published in numerous newspapers.

The incident was also investigated by the United Nations Fact Finding Mission on the Gaza Conflict. Khaled Abd Rabbo told the mission members that he came out along with his wife and three children when heard an order by the IDF soldiers, all of them holding white flags. According to the report published in September 2009, the Mission found Khaled and Kawthar Abd Rabbo to be credible and reliable witnesses and it had no reason to doubt the veracity of the main elements of their testimony, which it says is consistent with the accounts it received from other eyewitnesses and NGOs. The report concludes that the Israeli soldiers deliberately shot at the family members, as they could not perceive any danger from the house, its occupants or the surroundings. The report bases its conclusion on the premise that the family, consisting of a man, a young and an elderly woman and three small girls, some of them waving white flags, stepped out of the house and stood still for several minutes waiting for instructions from the soldiers.

Pro-Israeli group CAMERA said that Khaled Abd Rabbo delivered contradictory testimonies to the Human Rights Watch and Goldstone Report respectively as to whether he was inside the house or outside during the shooting.

A researcher from Jerusalem Center for Public Affairs colonel (ret.) J.D. Halevi said that contrary to the statements made by Rabbo family, information posted on the sites of Palestinian armed groups reveal the exchange of fire between the IDF and armed Palestinians in the area of the incident close in time to the events.

== See also ==
- International law and the Arab-Israeli conflict
- Media coverage of the Israeli-Palestinian conflict
- Israel and the United Nations
- Palestine and the United Nations
