= Ubayd Allah =

Ubayd Allah (Arabic: عبيد الله), also spelled or transliterated Obaidullah, Obaydullah, Obeidallah, or Ubaydullah, is a male Arabic given name that means "Servant of God". It is frequently shortened to Obaid or Al-Ubayd.

== Given name ==
=== Obaidullah ===
- Obaidullah (detainee), an Afghan detainee held in Guantanamo
- Obaidullah (Bangladeshi cricketer), Bangladeshi cricketer
- Obaidullah (Pakistani cricketer), Pakistani cricketer
- Obaidullah (Kandahar politician), elected to Afghanistan's Wolesi Jirga in 2005
- Obaidullah Akhund, Afghan defence minister
- Obaidullah Aleem, Pakistani poet
- Obaidullah Baig, Pakistani writer
- Obaidullah Hamzah (born 1972), Bangladeshi Islamic scholar
- Obaidullah Karimi, Afghan footballer
- Azmi Maulana Obaidullah Khan, Indian National Congress politician
- Obaidullah Rameen, Afghan politician

=== Ubaydallah ===
- Ubayd-Allah ibn Abd-Allah, hadith narrator
- Ubayd Allah al-Mahdi Billah, founder of the Fatimid dynasty
- Ubayd-Allah ibn Jahsh, brother of Zaynab bint Jahsh
- Ubayd Allah Abu Marwan, Spanish military personnel
- Ubayd Allah ibn Umar, son of Caliph Umar
- Ubayd-Allah ibn Ziyad, a son of Ziyad ibn Abi Sufyan
- Ubaydullah Khan, Khan of Bukhara (1534–1539)

=== Others ===
- Obeid Allah ibn al-Habhab, important Umayyad official in Egypt from 724 to 734
- Ubaydah ibn al-Harith, son of Harith ibn Abd al-Muttalib
- Abū 'Ubayd 'Abd Allāh al-Bakrī, Andalusian-Arab geographer and historian
- Gibadulla Murtasin (Ğobäydulla Mortaza), Turkestan-born teacher among the Finnish Tatar community

== Surname ==
- Talha ibn Ubayd-Allah, a companion of Muhammad
- Abu Zafar Obaidullah, Bangladeshi writer
- Dean Obeidallah, American comedian
- Habibah binte Ubayd-Allah, daughter of Ubayd-Allah ibn Jahsh

== See also ==
- Al-Ubaid (disambiguation), for the various uses and romanizations of the root name Ubayd
- Ubaydul Haq (disambiguation) and variants
