= Abdul Rasul =

Abdul Rasul (Arabic: عبد الرسول) is an Arabic male given name, meaning servant of the prophet.

Abdul Rasul may also refer to:

== People ==
- Abdul Rasul Sayyaf (born 1946), Afghan Islamist politician
- Salah Abdul Rasool Al Blooshi (born 1981), Bahraini held in Guantanamo
- Abdul Rasul (Iraqi scientist) (died 1983), Iraqi nuclear engineer, reportedly killed by Israel
- Abdul Rasul (Uyghur), Pakistani citizen of Uyghur origin, leader of the Asian Muslims Human Rights Bureau

== Other uses ==
- 21483 Abdulrasool, asteroid
