= Qays al-Ghassani =

Qays al-Ghassani, aka Abd al-Masih

Martyr
- Born: Najran
- Died: 9 March (unknown year); Ramla
- Venerated in: Eastern Orthodox Church

Qays al-Ghassani, also known as 'Abd al-Masih, was a medieval Christian martyr. He died in the 9th century, during a wave of conversions to Islam. His death was recorded in a 10th-century manuscript now belonging to Saint Catherine's Monastery, on Mount Sinai.

== Life ==
Qays, called ibn Rabi and ibn Yazid al-Ghassani, was a Christian Arab of Najran, in southern Arabia. Living in the 9th century CE he fell in with a group of Muslims who practised raiding, and while in their company converted to Islam. However, after some thirteen years, while at Baalbek, he heard the Gospel being read by a priest; he was reminded of his past life as a Christian, and became convinced of the error of his ways. He renounced his conversion to Islam and became a monk, first at Sabas, then at Mount Sinai. He served as steward, then superior, at Mount Sinai, and during this time he needed to travel to Ramla on a legal matter. While there he was recognized by an associate from his raiding days and arrested as an apostate. He was tried, and when he refused to return to Islam he was beheaded.
