= Obadé =

Coordinates: 13°18′N 0°18′W

- Interactive map of Obadé
- Country: Burkina Faso
- Region: Est Region
- Province: Gnagna Province
- Department: Manni Department

Population (2019)
  - Total: 1,948

Obadé is a town in the Manni Department of Gnagna Province in eastern Burkina Faso.

Population
Year	Pop.	±%
1985	661	—
2006	1,278	+93.3%
2019	1,948	+52.4%
