= Guillermo Abadía Morales =

Colombian linguist, academic, anthropologist, researcher and indigenous language expert

- Born: 8 May 1912; Santa Fe de Bogota, Colombia
- Died: 21 January 2010 (aged 97)
- Scientific career
- Fields: Linguist, anthropology, folklore researcher, indigenous language expert

Guillermo Abadía Morales (8 May 1912 – 21 January 2010) was a Colombian linguist, academic, anthropologist, folklore researcher and indigenous language expert. Abadía Morales was one of the first to champion the study of indigenous languages in Colombia.

In 1934, Abadía Morales began living with seventeen separate indigenous Colombian tribes for ten years. Each of the tribes he observed represented a different language family within the country. Abadía Morales was able to classify the languages of 105 indigenous peoples into nine language families. He developed the "Abadia Classification" system to group the families by geographic distribution within Colombia.

Abadía Morales was the author of over twenty-five books on linguistics, folklore, and identity. His best known work, Compendio General de Folclor (General Folklore Compendium) has sold more than 40,000 copies since it was first published in 1970. Compendio is now widely used as a social science textbook in Colombia. He also created a series of educational broadcast focusing on folklore, which have been broadcast on Radiodifusora Nacional de Colombia.

Abadía Morales served as the folklore coordinator for the Musical Documentation Center at the Colombian Culture Institute, secretary of the National Folklore Board, and professor and head of the Center for Folklore Studies at the National University of Colombia.

Guillermo Abadía Morales died of natural causes on 21 January 2010 at the age of 97.

== Early life and education ==
Abadía was born in Santa Fe de Bogota in 1912. In 1914, his Family moved to the neighboring town of Sopo, Colombia, only to return to Bogota in 1919. He completed his high school education at la Escuela Ricaurte. After which he enrolled at the National University in Bogota where he spent five years studying medicine and pharmacy. During this period, he participated in an educational vaccination program in the jungles of the Choco region. It is here that he began to familiarize himself with the traditional cultures of Colombia.

== Research in Colombia ==
From 1934 to 1944 Abadía spent 10 years studying the language systems of indigenous Colombian populations. As a result of this work, he managed to classify 105 indigenous populations into nine language families. This system became known as the "Abadia Classification".

== Professional career ==
Abadía Morales joined the faculty at the National University of Colombia as a professor of the conservation of music. He kept this post for 22 years and later became the director of the Center for Folkloric Studies. He also helped to found El Museo Organológico de Colombia and the Instituto Colombiano de Cultura. In addition to his work in academia, Abadía Morales was the first broadcaster for a radio program HJN which eventually became Radiodifusora Nacional de Colombia. Here he helped create weekly programs that played and discussed the importance of Colombian oral history and music In addition to writing prolifically about Colombian folklore and music, he also wrote extensively about regional variations in Colombian dance.

As mentioned, Abadía Morales wrote over 25 books that covered the diversity of Colombian music, folklore, and issues surrounding identity. The most popular of which is his Compendio General De Folklore Colombiano. This book has remained in print for over 40 years.

== Works ==
- Compendio general de folclore colombiano / Guillermo Abadía. 1983 4a ed., rev. y acotada. 547 p. : ill.; 22 cm. Bogotá : Fondo de Promoción de la Cultura del Banco Popular. (3. ed en 1977).
- La música folclórica colombiana / Guillermo Abadía. 1973. 158 p. illus. 22 cm [Bogotá?] Universidad Nacional de Colombia, Dirección de Divulgación Cultural.* El Gran libro de Colombia / Guillermo Abadía; Edgar Bustamante 1981- v. : ill. (some col.); 31 cm [Bogotá, Colombia] : Círculo de Lectores.
- El correo de las brujas y la literatura oral / Guillermo Abadía. 1994 1. ed. Spanish Book 196 p. : ill. (some col.); 24 cm. Santafé de Bogotá, Colombia : Tres Culturas Editores, ISBN 958-9096-27-1
- Instrumentos musicales: folclore colombiano / Guillermo Abadía 1991. 174 p. : ill.; 21 cm. Bogotá : Banco Popular, Fondo de Promoción de la Cultura,
- 2.300 adiciones al vocabulario folclórico colombiano / Guillermo Abadía. 1994. 370 p. : ill.; 21 cm. Bogotá : Fondo de Promoción de la Cultura del Banco Popular; ISBN 958-9003-77-X
- Coplerío colombiano / Guillermo Abadía. 2000 1. ed. en Panamericana Editorial. Spanish Book 188 p. : ill.; 21 cm. Santafé de Bogotá, Colombia : Panamericana Editorial; ISBN 958-30-0657-2
- Guabinas y mojigangas / Guillermo Abadía. 1997 1. ed. Spanish Book 80 p. : ill.; 24 cm [Bogotá] : Centro de Documentación Musical, Dirección General de Artes, Ministerio de Cultura; ISBN 958-612-284-0
- ABC del folclore colombiano / Guillermo Abadía. 1995 1. ed. Spanish Book 202 p. : ill. (some col.), maps; 23 cm. Santafé de Bogotá, Colombia : Panamericana Editorial; ISBN 958-30-0189-9
- Algunos cantos nativos, tradicionales de la región de Guapi, Cauca / Jesús Bermúdez Silva; Guillermo Abadía 1966 Spanish Book 24 p. illus., music. 24 cm. Bogotá, Imprenta Nacional.
- Aires musicales de los indios guambiano del Cauca (Colombia) / Jesús Bermúdez Silva; Guillermo Abadía. 1970 Spanish Book 31 p., [4] leaves of plates : ill.; 22 cm. Bogotá : Imprenta Nacional,
- Folclore lúdico del Litoral Pacífico Colombiano 2 sound tape reels : analog, 3 3/4 ips, full track, mono.; 5 in. Indiana University, Bloomington.; Archives of Traditional Music. 1963–1966

Description: 2 sound tape reels; analog, 3 3/4 ips, full track, mono.; 5 in.
( Contenido: El Floron (2 versions) - El Trapiche (2 versions) - La Paula -La Margarita Patiana - El chocolate - Jugar con mi Tia - El Punto - La Pelusa - La Cajita - Bunde de San Antonio - Bunde de San José - Buenaventura puerto de mar - Canoita de Beté - Agua de caña - La Caramba.
/ Canciones para acompañar juegos. Cada pieza musical está precedida de una descripción. Dejado por Abadía en los Archives of Traditional Music en 1967, grabado por el compilador entre 1963 y 1966 en lugares de la costa pacífica colombiana.

- Música indígena y negra del Chocó. / Jesús Bermúdez Silva; Guillermo Abadía. 1963–1964. Archivo sonoro. 6 rollos de ciinta magnética, analog, 3 3/4 ips, 1 pista, mono.; 5-7 pulgadas.

Parte I. Música indígena del Chocó, incluyendo arrullos, alabados, cantos de bogar.

Parte II. Música negra del Chocó, incluyendo currulaos, bambucos, jugas, rumbas, bostons, polkas, alabados, valses y cantos de bogar; entrevista con un artesano de instrumentos musicales, y cuentos. "Acompañado por índices y notas en español e inglés y por un cuaderno de 24 páginas, "Algunos cantos nativos tradicionales de la región de Guapi (Cauca)" by Jesús Bermúdez-Silva and Guillermo Abadía M. (Bogotá: Imprenta Nacional, 1966). Grabado en trabajo de campo folclorista entre indios Chocó Indians y negros en el departamento del Cauca, costa pacífica colombiana, en 1963-1964.

Viaje organizado por el Instituto Popular de Cultura de Cali, con ayuda del Centro de Estudio Folclóricos y Musicales de la Universidad Nacional de Bogotá. Ahora en depósito en Archives of Traditional Music, Indiana University, Bloomington.

- Instrumentos musicales de Colombia = Musical instruments of Colombia. Guillermo Abadía. 2000s. CD-ROM : sd., col.; 4 3/4 in. Bogotá : Fundación BAT, Colombia : Virtual Technologies; ISBN 958-33-2829-4. Clasificación de 65 instrumentos; incluye 72 fotos de instrumentos; 58 videos, 3 archivos sonoros. Textos de Guillermo Abadía Morales; comentario adicional por Antonio Arnedo, David Puerta, Carlos Rojas, Hugo Candelario González.
- La música y la danza en la zona del litoral atlántico / Guillermo Abadía. 1986. [6] p.; 24 cm [Colombia] : Instituto Colombiano de Cultura : Telecom.
- La música y la danza en la zona llanera / Guillermo Abadía. 1986. [8] p.; 24 cm [Colombia] : Instituto Colombiano de Cultura : Telecom.
- La música y la danza en la zona andina : Antioquia, Caldas, Quindio, Risaralda, Santanderes, Boyacá, Cundinamarca, Tolima, Huila, Valle, Cauca, Nariño y Orientales / Guillermo Abadía. 1986. [11] p.; 24 cm [Colombia] : Instituto Colombiano de Cultura : Telecom.
- La música y la danza en la zona del litoral pacífico : Valle del Cauca, Cauca, Choco, Nariño / Guillermo Abadía. 1986. [11] p.; 24 cm [Colombia] : Instituto Colombiano de Cultura : Telecom,
- Sinopsis del arsenal organológico musical colombiano / Guillermo Abadía. 198?. 36 p. : ill.; 17 cm [Bogotá, Colombia?] : Centro colombo americano.
- Veinte estructuras de la guabina veleña y mojigangas de torbellino, y "ABC del folclore colombiano".
