= Abadiyeh, Egypt =

Archaeological site in Egypt

Abadiyeh is a place in Egypt situated about a dozen miles west of Dendera.

== Archaeological ==
W. M. Flinders Petrie was assisted with excavations by David Randall-MacIver and Arthur Cruttenden Mace, these having been done on the behalf of the Egyptian Exploration Fund (EEF). The excavations, considered in totality, consisted of sites along the west bank of the Nile in the Hiw region, found to contain artifacts of a Predynastic type. Prehistoric cemeteries were found at Abadiyas and Hu (Diospolis Parva). The prehistoric cemeteries at Abadiyeh were first excavated in 1898-1899, as part of a broader investigation of prehistoric Egyptian sites.
