= Abd al-Masih Salib al-Masudi =

- Monk of Paromeos Monastery
- Priest Abd al-Masih Salib al-Masudi
- Native name: القمص عبد المسيح صليب المسعودي
- Church: Coptic Orthodox Church

Personal details
- Born: Egypt
- Denomination: Coptic Orthodox Christian

Abd al-Masih Salib al-Mas'udi (Note: Arabic: عبد المسيح صليب المسعودي) (1848–1935) was an Egyptian monk and author.

== Biography ==
ʿAbd al-Masīḥ Ṣalīb al-Masūʿdī was ordained a monk by his uncle, ʿAbd al-Masīḥ al-Kabīr, in 1874.

He served at the Paromeos Monastery at Wadi El Natrun and was summoned by Pope Cyril V of Alexandria to assist in the administration of the church in Cairo.

He learned Hebrew, Syriac, Greek, and Coptic and became a prolific writer. His best known work is his interpretation of the Epact.

He died at the age of eighty-seven.

== Works ==
In addition to his work, above, he wrote:

- Kītāb al-Khulaji al-Muqaddas, Cairo, 1903;
- Kītāb al-Tuḥfah al-Saniyyah, Cairo, 1925;
- Kītāb al-Durrah al-Nafisah fī Ḥisābāt al-Kanīsah, Cairo, 1926;
- Al-Tuḥfah al-Barāmūsiyyah fī Sharḥ wa-Tatimmat Qawā'id Hisāb Al-Abqaṭi lil-Kanīsah al-Qibṭiyyah al-Urthudhuksiyyah, Cairo, 1925;
- Kītāb al-Karmah, Cairo, 1927;
- Kītāb al-Asrār , Cairo, 1926;
- Tuḥfat al-Sā'ilīn fī Dhikr Adyirat Ruhbān al-Miṣriyyīnn, Cairo, 1932.
