= Obeid (name) =

Obeid is one romanization of a common Arabic given name and surname.

It may refer to:

== Given name ==
- Obeid bin Said bin Rashid, first Ruler of Dubai under the Al Bu Falasah, ruling for three years prior to his death in 1836
- Obeid Al-Dosari (born 1975), Saudi Arabian football player

== Middle name ==
- Ahmed Obeid bin Daghr (born 1952), Yemeni politician and former Prime Minister of Yemen 2016 to 2018
- Mohammed Obeid Al-Salhi (born 1986), Saudi middle distance runner
- Mustafa Osman Obeid Salim, Sudanese Army officer and Chief of Staff

== Surname ==
- Alejandra Obeid (born 1978), Argentine politician
- Sheikh Omar Bin Khaled Obeid, crowned sheikh of Dawlat Obeid, a dignitary, and well known for philanthropy endeavors around the world. (1999)
- Atef Obeid (1932–2014), Egyptian politician
- Eddie Obeid (born 1943), Australian politician and convicted criminal
- Guillermo Obeid (1941–1999), Argentine fencer
- Jean Obeid (1939–2021), Lebanese politician, government minister and journalist
- Jorge Obeid (1947–2014), Argentine politician, Governor of Santa Fe
- Lina M. Obeid (1955–2019), American medical researcher
- Reem Obeid, Lebanese footballer
- Suleiman Obeid (1984–2025), Palestinian footballer

== See also ==
- Al-Ubaid (disambiguation), for links to the same name in various other romanizations
- El Obeid, city in Sudan
- Ubaydul Haq (disambiguation) and variants
