= Ubayda =

Arabic female musician and singer of Abbasid period

Ubayda عبيدة
- Occupations: Arabic singer and musician
- Writing career
- Language: Arabic
- Period: Islamic Golden Age (Abbasid era)

ˈUbayda al-Ṭunbūriya (Arabic: عبيدة الطنبورية) (also Obeidet or Ubaida; fl. c. 830) was an Arabian tunbūr or pandore player and singer.

Ubayda's father was the mawlā of one of Abdallah ibn Tahir al-Khurasani's companions. She was taught the tunbūr by Al-Zabaidi al-Tunburi, a guest in her family's home.

Following the death of her parents, she became a public singer. She was purchased by Ali ibn al-Faraj al-Jahhi. They had a son. She took several lovers who spent large amounts of money on her, making her wealthy.

She was considered the best instrumentalist of her era and was surnamed tunbūrīyya. Her contemporary, tunbūr player Masdud, would not enter a contest with her as he feared she would win. Musician Ishaq al-Mawsili said of her: "In the art of tunbūr playing, anyone who seeks to go beyond Ubayda makes mere noise." He once had himself invited to one of her performances. He arrived incognito at the house where the performance was held; she performed excellently until she learned that he was there. Her tunbūr was inlaid with ebony with the inscription "Everything may be suffered in love, except treason."

An article for Ubayda containing a detailed description of her career was included in Abu al-Faraj al-Isfahani's 10th-century encyclopedia Kitāb al-aghāni. Ubayda's life history was conveyed to Abu-l-Faraj by Jahza al-Barmakī and Ja'far ibn Qudāma. Both had learned of Ubayda from Ahmad ibn al-Tayyib al-Sarakhsī. Historian Hilary Kilpatrick, in her book Making the Great Book of Songs, writes that Abu-l-Faraj may have created a composite account of the two stories, one of which was a fuller account.
