= Reprobation =

Christian doctrine

Reprobation, in Christian theology, is a doctrine which teaches that a person can reject the gospel to a point where God in turn rejects them and curses their conscience. The English word reprobate is from the Latin root probare (English: prove, test), which gives the Latin participle reprobatus (reproved, condemned), the opposite of approbatus (commended, approved). The doctrine is first found in Jeremiah 6:30, but also found in many passages of scripture such as Romans 1:20–28, 2 Corinthians 13:5–6, Proverbs 1:23–33, John 12:37–41, and Hebrews 6:4–8.

Some in the Christian community will link reprobation directly with the unforgivable sin.

In Christian doctrine, when a sinner is so hardened as to feel no remorse or misgiving of conscience for particularly vile acts, it is considered a sign of reprobation. The doctrine does not stipulate that because of a reprobate's wicked deeds that God will not save them, but rather that God has effectively permanently withdrawn his offer of salvation by giving them over to a seared conscience, and now they are a reprobate capable of willingly committing these certain sins not common among mankind.

== Calvinistic doctrine ==
- As stated in the Canons of Dordrecht, First Head (Chapter 1) Article 15 and Article 16:

Moreover, Holy Scripture most especially highlights this eternal and undeserved grace of our election and brings it out more clearly for us, in that it further bears witness that not all people have been chosen but that some have not been chosen or have been passed by in God's eternal election-- those, that is, concerning whom God, on the basis of his entirely free, most just, irreproachable, and unchangeable good pleasure, made the following decision: to leave them in the common misery into which, by their own fault, they have plunged themselves; not to grant them saving faith and the grace of conversion; but finally to condemn and eternally punish them (having been left in their own ways and under his just judgment), not only for their unbelief but also for all their other sins, in order to display his justice. And this is the decision of reprobation, which does not at all make God the author of sin, but rather its fearful, irreproachable, just judge and avenger.

- As explained by Loraine Boettner, The Reformed Doctrine of Predestination (Eerdmans, 1932)

The doctrine of absolute Predestination of course logically holds that some are foreordained to death as truly as others are foreordained to life. The very terms "elect" and "election" imply the terms "non-elect" and "reprobation." When some are chosen out others are left not chosen. The high privileges and glorious destiny of the former are not shared with the latter. This, too, is of God. We believe that from all eternity God has intended to leave some of Adam's posterity in their sins, and that the decisive factor in the life of each is to be found only in God’s will. As Mozley has said, the whole race after the fall was "one mass of perdition," and "it pleased God of His sovereign mercy to rescue some and to leave others where they were; to raise some to glory, giving them such grace as necessarily qualified them for it, and abandon the rest, from whom He withheld such grace, to eternal punishment." In all of the Reformed creeds in which the doctrine of reprobation is dealt with at all it is treated as an essential part of the doctrine of predestination. The Westminster Confession, after stating the doctrine of election, adds: “The rest of mankind, God was pleased, according to the inscrutable counsel of His own will, whereby He extendeth or withholdeth mercy as He pleaseth, for the glory of His sovereign power over His creatures, to pass by, and to ordain them to dishonor and wrath for their sin, to the praise of His glorious justice.”
