= Juan de la Abadía =

Spanish painter

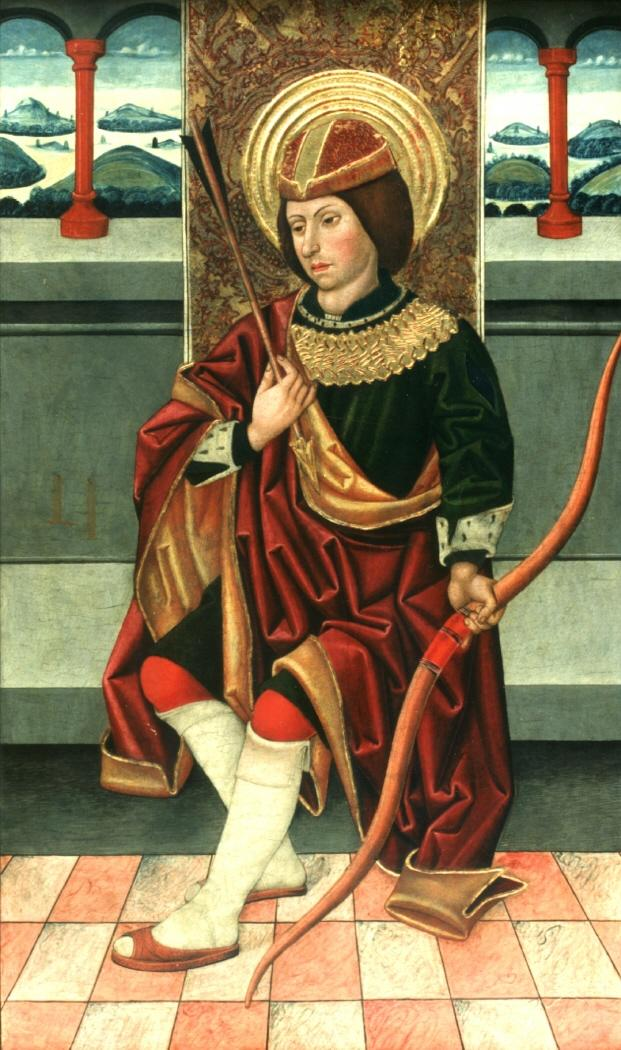
San Sebastián, Madrid, Museo Lázaro Galdiano after the painting of the Saviour, Museum of Zaragoza.

Juan de la Abadía el Viejo (fl. 1470–1498, probable death 1498) was a Spanish painter in the gothic Spanish-Flemish style. His son, Juan de la Abadía el Joven, worked with him after 1490.

His known works include Santa Catalina (1490) in the church of la Magdalena de Huesca, now lost, the Saviour from the hermitage of Broto, now at the Museum of Zaragoza and the Santo Domingo in Almudévar (Huesca), after which he was known as the Maestro de Almudévar until identified by the art historian Ricardo del Arco.
