= Obaidul Haq =

Ubaydul Haq is a Bengali masculine given name of Arabic origin meaning Servant of the Truth. It may refer to

- M. Obaidul Huq (died 2012), Bangladeshi engineer, freedom fighter and politician
- Obaidul Haque (1934–2008), Bangladeshi Islamic scholar and politician
- Obaidul Huq (1911–2007), Bangladeshi cinematographer
- Obaidul Huq Khandaker, Bangladeshi politician
- Ubaidul Haq (1928–2007), Bangladeshi Islamic scholar and former khatib of Baitul Mukarram National Mosque

== See also ==
- Ubayd (name)
- Haque
