= Maya (given name) =

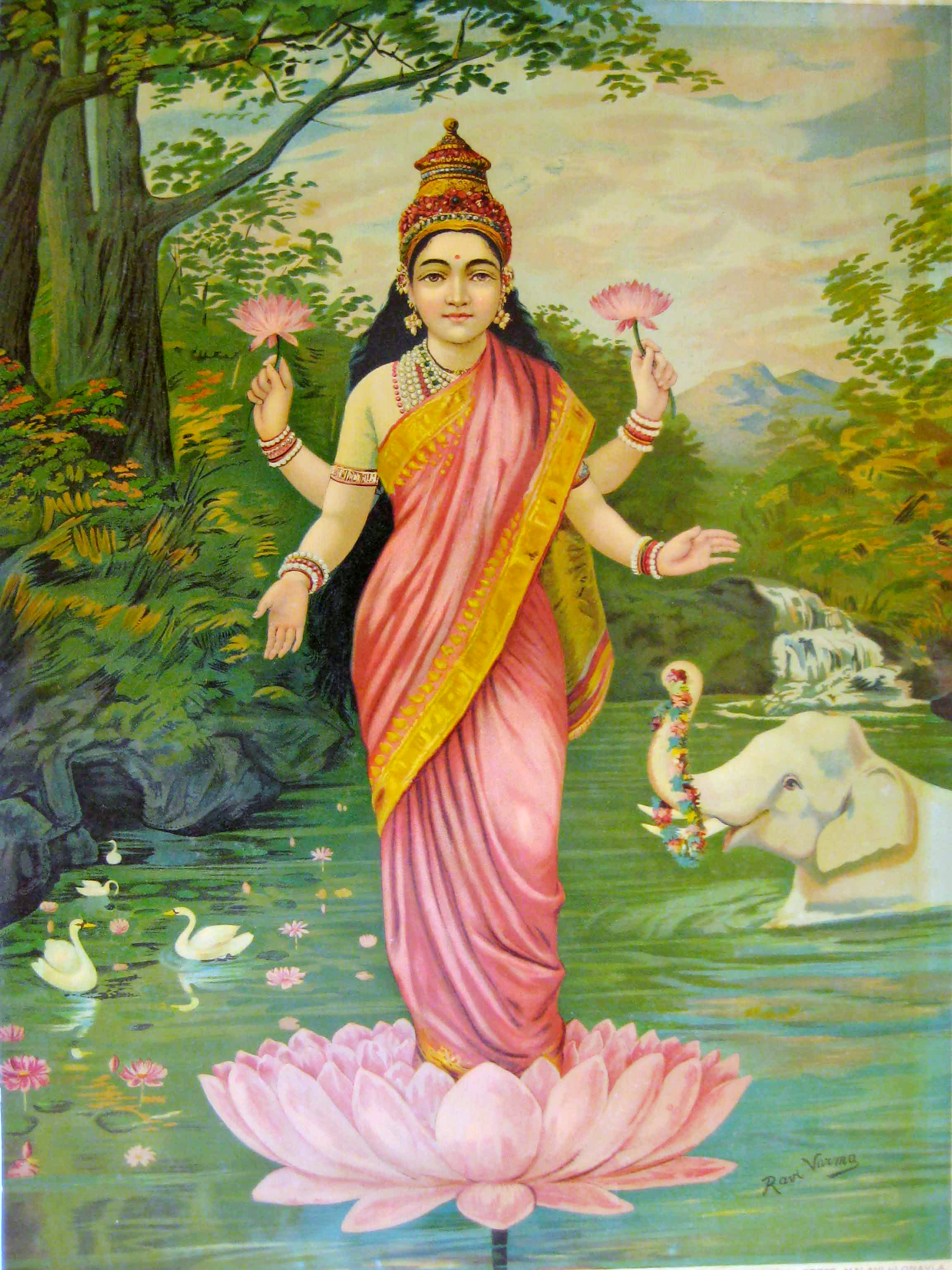
Maya is an alternate name of Hindu goddess Lakshmi.

Maya is a feminine name in various languages with various meanings.

In the ancient Indian language Sanskrit, Māyā means "the illusory nature of reality or the illusion of creation", and is an alternate name of the Hindu goddess Lakshmi.

In the Tupi language, of southern Brazil, it means "mother", while Mayara means "grandmother". In the Māori language, the name means "courage" or "bravery", and is popular for Māori girls in New Zealand. The name may be a variant form of the Greek theonym Maia (Μαῖα in Ancient Greek), the eldest of the Pleiades and the mother of Hermes in Greek and Roman mythology.

Variously spelled Maia or Maja it can also be used as a short form of Maria or Mary in Christian culture such as Germany, the Scandinavian countries, and various East European and Balkan countries. Maya is also used as a short form for the name Amalia or the Basque name Amaia or Amaya (meaning "the end") in Spanish-speaking countries.

Another variant of Maya is the Arabic name Mayya (مية) which comes from may (مي) which means either "good servant," "pretty woman," or "water." It was also a popular name among medieval Arab women, notably Mayya Bint Muqatil, the lover of the Arab poet Dhul-Rumma

In Hebrew Maya can be derived from the word mayim (מים), which means "water."

Maya is also a Japanese given name, with different meanings depending on the kanji used.

== Popularity ==
All variants of the name are well-used in the English-speaking world and other countries. Maya has ranked among the one thousand most popular names for girls in the United States since 1970 and among the top one hundred most popular names for American girls since 2002. Spelling variant Maia has ranked among the top one thousand names for American girls since 1996. In 2022, it was the 21st most popular name given to girls in Canada.

== Women ==
=== A–C ===
- Maya Abu Al-Hayat, Palestinian novelist and poet
- Maya Ackerman, Belarusian born American computer scientist
- Maya Ajmera, American author, publisher, and nonprofit founder
- Maya Alagh, Indian television and film actress
- Maya Alcantara (born 2000), American born Filipina football defender
- Maya Alhawary (born 1979), Emirati educator
- Maya Ali (born 1989), Pakistani actress
- Maya Al-Zahrani (born 2008), Saudi footballer
- Maya Angelou (1928–2014), African-American author and poet
- Maya Arad (born 1971), American-based Israeli writer
- Mathangi "Maya" Arulpragasam (born 1975), better known as M.I.A., British singer/rapper
- Maya-Gozel Aimedova (born 1941), Turkmen actress
- Maya Arusi (born 1982), Israeli taekwondo practitioner and Olympian
- Maya Attoun (1974-2022), Israeli multidisciplinary artist
- Maya Azucena, American singer-songwriter, recording artist and humanitarian
- Maya Badian (born 1945), Romanian-born Canadian composer, musicologist, and professor.
- Maya Banks, American romance writer
- Maya Bamert (born 1979), Swiss bobsledder and Olympian
- Maya Bar-Hillel (born 1943), Israeli psychologist
- Maya Barqui (born 1985), Israeli football defender
- Maya Beiser (born 1963), American musician, cellist, performing artist and producer
- Maya Bejerano (born 1949), Israeli poet
- Maya Belenkaya (born 1931), former Soviet figure skater
- Maya Kalle-Bentzur (born 1958), Israeli Olympic runner and long jumper
- Maya Berović (born 1987), Bosnian pop star
- Maya Bird-Murphy (born 1992), American architect and educator
- Maya Blagoeva (born 1956), retired Bulgarian artistic gymnast and Olympian
- Maya Kaathryn Bohnhoff (born 1954), American science fiction and fantasy writer
- Maya Bouskilla (born 1977), Israeli singer
- Maya Brady (born 2001), American college softball player
- Maya Bruney (born 1998), British-born sprinter with dual nationality who competes for Italy since 2021
- Maya Burman (born 1971), French artist
- Maya-Camille Broussard, American chef, author, and restaurant owner
- Maya Bulgakova (1932-1994), Soviet and Russian actress
- Maya Buzinova (1929-2022), Russian animator
- Maya Caldwell (born 1998), American professional basketball player
- Maya Calé-Benzoor (born 1958), Israeli former Olympic runner and long jumper
- Maya Casabianca (1941-2018), French-Israeli singer
- Maya Devi Chettry (1921-1994), Indian politician
- Maya Chinchilla, American poet
- Maya Choudhury, Indian actress
- Maya Chowdhry (born 1964), British playwright, poet and transmedia interactive artist.
- Maya Cloetens (born 2002), Belgian biathlete
- Maya Cohen Levy (born 1955), Israeli painter and sculptor.
- Maya Jane Coles, British music producer, audio engineer and DJ
- Maya Cumming (born 2001), Australian singer-songwriter known professionally as MAY-A

=== D-H ===
- Maya Days, American singer
- Maya Delilah (born 2000), English singer-songwriter and guitarist
- Maya Deren (1917–1961), Ukrainian born American avant-garde filmmaker
- Maya Diab (born 1980), Lebanese singer
- Maya DiRado (born 1993), American retired competitive swimmer and Olympian
- Maya Doms (born 2001), American professional women's soccer player
- Maya Dunietz (born 1981), Israeli musician and artist
- Maya Dusenbery, American journalist and author
- Maya Ellis, British politician
- Maya Erskine (born 1987), American actress
- Maya Eshet (born 1990), Israeli actress
- Maya Esparza, American politician
- Maya Horgan Famodu (born 1991), Nigerian-American entrepreneur and business executive
- Maya Fernández (born 1971), Chilean biologist, veterinarian and politician
- Maya Fidawi, Lebanese illustrator of children's books
- Maya Forbes (born 1968), American screenwriter and television producer
- Maya Ford (born 1979), American musician
- Maya Forstater (born 1973) British gender critical activist
- Maya Gabeira (born 1987), Brazilian surfer
- Maya Gamliel (born 2008), Israeli rhythmic gymnast
- Maya Vladimirova Georgieva (1955-2023), Bulgarian volleyball player and Olympian
- Maya Georgieva (born 1962), former Bulgarian rhythmic gymnast
- Maya Ghazal (born c. 1999), United Kingdom-based Syrian refugee, a UNHCR Goodwill Ambassador, the first female Syrian pilot, and a Diana Award winner.
- Maya Ghosh (1949-2019), Bangladeshi film, stage and television actress
- Maya Glezarova (1924-2017), Russian violinist and academic
- Maya Goded (born 1967), Mexican photographer and documentary film maker.
- Maya Gold (born 1981), Hungarian pornographic actress
- Maya Christina Gonzalez (born 1964), American artist, illustrator, educator and publisher of Chicana descent
- Maya Gordon (born 2001), American soccer player
- Maya Goshen (born 2000), Israeli judoka and Olympian
- Maya Govind (1940-2022), Indian lyricist
- Maya Green, American a community based HIV screening and prevention program.
- Maýa Gulyýewa (1920-2018), Turkmen and Soviet soprano opera singer and actress
- Maya Hahn (born 2001), New Zealand footballer
- Maya Haïdar Boustani, Lebanese archaeologist and museum curator
- Maya Hakvoort (born 1966), Dutch musical actress
- Maya Hanoomanjee (born 1952), Mauritian politician
- Maya Harris (born 1967), American lawyer, public policy advocate, writer, and sister of Kamala Harris
- Maya Harrisson (born 1992), Swiss-Brazilian alpine skier and Olympian
- Maya Hawke (born 1998), American actress
- Maya Hayes (born 1992), American soccer coach and former player
- Maya Hayuk (born 1969), American artist
- Maya Higa (born 1998), a conservationist and Twitch streamer who streams under the name
- Maya Hijikata (born 2004), Japanese professional footballer
- Maya Hungerbühler (born 1943), Swiss former swimmer and Olympian

=== I–M ===
- Maya Inchikyan (1930-2013), Armenian and Soviet organic chemist
- Maya Isacowitz (born 1987), Israeli singer-songwriter
- Maya Jackson Randall (1979-2013), American journalist
- Maya Jama (born 1994), British television presenter and radio DJ
- Maya Jasanoff (born 1974), American academic
- Maya Jayapal (born 1941), Indian historian, author, columnist, teacher, and counselor.
- Maya Joint (born 2006), American-born Australian tennis player
- Maya Jribi (1960-2018), Tunisian politician
- Maya Kamath (1951-2001), Indian cartoonist
- Maya Karin (born 1979), Malaysian film actress, television host and singer
- Maya Katsumura (born 2002) Japanese Idol of Japanese group NiziU
- Maya Kazan (born 1986), American actress and director
- Maya Kelly (diver) (born 2006), American high diver
- Maya Kenig, Israeli film director, writer and actress
- Maya Khromykh (born 2006), Russian figure skater
- Maya Kingma (born 1995), Dutch triathlete and Olympian
- Maya Kobayashi (born 1979), Japanese journalist
- Maya Kodnani, Indian politician
- Maya Koizumi (born 1988), Japanese actress, tarento, and former gravure idol
- Maya Kopitseva (1924-2005), Soviet-Russian still-life artist
- Maya Koveshnikova (1926-2013), Russian painter
- Maya S. Krishnan, Indian actress and comedian
- Maya Kristalinskaya (1932-1985), Soviet-Russian singer
- Maya Kucherskaya (born 1970), Russian fiction writer, columnist, critic and pedagogue
- Maya Kulenovic (born 1975), Canadian artist
- Maya Labad (born 2002), Canadian ice hockey player
- Maya Lasker-Wallfisch (born 1958), British psychoanalytic psychotherapist, author and educator, specialising in transgenerational trauma
- Maya Lauqué (born 1979), French journalist and television presenter
- Maya Lavelle, international singer-songwriter composer, record producer and music video producer
- Maya Lawrence (born 1980), American fencer and Olympian
- Maya Learned (born 1996), American rugby union player
- Maya Leibovich, Israeli rabbi
- Maya Leinenbach (born 2004), German influencer and author
- Maya Le Clark (born 2011), American actress
- Maya Le Tissier (born 2002), British professional footballer
- Maya Lin (born 1959), American architect and sculptor, designer of the Vietnam Veterans Memorial
- Maya Lindholm (born 1990), German wheelchair basketball player and Paralympian
- Maya Lucia (born 2003), Maltese footballer
- Maya MacGuineas (born 1968), American president of the Committee for a Responsible Federal Budge
- Maya Marcel-Keyes (born 1985), American social and political activist and daughter of Republican politician Alan Keyes
- Maya Maron (born 1980), Israeli actress
- Maya McCutcheon (born 2001), American professional women's soccer player
- Maya Merhige, American marathon swimmer
- Maya Meschkuleit (born 2001), Canadian rower and Olympian
- Maya Millete (born 1981), American woman who went missing in 2021
- Maya Mishalska (born 1974), Mexican actress
- Maya Moore (born 1989), American basketball player
- Maya Morsy, Egyptian political scientist, specialist in public policy, and advocate for woman's and human rights
- Maýa Musaskaýa (born 2000), Turkmen professional footballer

=== N–R ===
- Maya Naroliya, Indian politician
- Maya Nasri (born 1976), Lebanese singer
- Maya Nassar (born 1986), Dutch-Lebanese competitive fitness model, TV host and entrepreneur
- Maya Nasser (1979-2012), Syrian journalist
- Maya Neelakantan (born 2013), Indian Tamil musician
- Maya Newell, Australian filmmaker
- Maya Okamoto (born 1967), Japanese voice actress
- Maya Paczuski (born 1963), Israeli born American academic
- Maya Panta, Nepalese politician
- Maya Parbhoe, Surinamese businesswoman and politician
- Maya Parnas (born 1974) Transnistrian politician and was the former acting Prime Minister of Transnistria
- Maya Paunovska (born 1988), retired Bulgarian group rhythmic gymnast
- Maya Pedersen-Bieri (born 1972), Swiss-Norwegian skeleton racer and Olympian
- Maya Pellegrini (born 2002), American born Chilean footballer
- Maya Penn (born 2000), American entrepreneur, philanthropist, animator, artist
- Maya K. Peterson (1980-2021), American historian
- Maya Petrova (born 1982), Russian former handball layer
- Maya Pindyck (born 1978), American poet, scholar, and visual artist
- Maya Plisetskaya (1925–2015), Soviet born ballet dancer
- Maya Postepski, Canadian musician and producer
- Maya Rao (1928-2014), Indian classical dancer, choreographer and educator, in Kathak dance
- Maya Krishna Rao (born 1935), solo Indian theatre artist, stand-up comedian and social activist
- Maya Ray (1927-2013), Indian lawyer and politician
- Maya Reaidy (born 1995), Lebanese model and beauty pageant titleholder who was crowned Miss Lebanon 2018
- Maya Rehberg (born 1994), German steeplechase athlete
- Maya Ritter (born 1993), Canadian actress
- Maya Lynne Robinson, American actress, writer and producer
- Maya Rockeymoore Cummings (born 1971), American consultant and politician
- Maya Rogers (born 1978), American business executive
- Maya Rosa (born 1986), Indonesian former tennis player
- Maya Rossin-Slater, American health economist
- Maya Rudolph (born 1972), American actress and Saturday Night Live cast member
- Maya Rumantir (born 1964), Indonesian model, actor, singer and politician of Minahasa descent
- Maya Rupert (born 1981), American political strategist, writer, and advocate

=== S–Z ===
- Maya Saban (born 1978), German singer
- Maya Sakura (born 1998), Japanese enka singer and child actress
- Maya Sansa (born 1975), Italian actress
- Maya Sar (born 1981), Bosnian singer-songwriter
- Maya Sazonova (born 1965), Kazakh race walker and Olympian
- Maya Schenwar (born 1982), American journalist and editor
- Countess Maya von Schönburg-Glauchau (1958-2019), German socialite.
- Maya Shankar, Indian cognitive scientist
- Maya Shemichishina (born 1972), Ukrainian hurdler and Olympian
- Maya Shenfeld, Israeli composer and musician
- Maya Shoef (born 1988), Israeli actress
- Maya Simantov (born 1982), Israeli singer and songwriter
- Maya Singh (born 1950), Indian politician
- Maya Sondhi (born 1983), British Indian actress
- Maya Simantov (born 1982), Israeli singer
- Maya Soetoro-Ng (born 1970), Indonesian-American half-sister of U.S. President Barack Obama
- Maya Sonenberg, American short story writer
- Maya Stange, Australian actress
- Maya Stein, German mathematician
- Maya Stojan (born 1984), Swiss actress
- Maya Stovall, American conceptual artist and anthropologist
- Maya Sumbadze (born 1972), Georgian artist
- Maya Surduts (1937-2016), Latvian-born, French activist and women's rights supporter
- Maya Tabakova (born 1978), Bulgarian rhythmic gymnast and Olympian
- Maya Tandon (born 1936), Indian anesthesiologist and road safety activist
- Maya Tahan (born 1999), Israeli tennis player
- Maya Tatsukawa, American author and illustrator of children's books
- Maya Thakuri (born 1946), Nepali writer
- Maya Tischler (born 1996), German politician
- Maya Tiwari (born 1952), humanitarian, world peace leader and author from Guyana
- Maya Tolstoy, marine geophysicist investigating earthquakes in the deep sea
- Maya Trotz, Guyanese environmental engineer and academic
- Maya Tskitishvili (born 1974), Georgian economist and politician
- Maya Turovskaya (1924-2019), Soviet and Russian theatrical and film critic, film historian, screenwriter, and culturologist
- Maya Ulanovskaya (1932-2020), American-born Russian-Israeli dissident in the Soviet Union and professor, writer, and translator in Israel.
- Maya Usova (born 1964), Russian former ice dancer and Olympian
- Maya Vik (born 1980), Norwegian singer
- Maya Washington, American filmmaker, actress, playwright, poet, writer, visualist, and arts educator
- Maya Wertheimer (born 1990), Israeli actress, model and television presenter.
- Maya Weug (born 2004), Dutch-Belgian-Spanish racing driver
- Maya Widmaier-Picasso (1935-2022), French born daughter of artist Pablo Picasso
- Maya Wildevuur (1944-2023), Dutch painter
- Maya Wiley (born 1964), American civil rights activist and lawyer, 2021 mayoral candidate for New York City
- Maya Yamazaki (born 1974), Japanese politician
- Maya Yamout, Lebanese social worker
- Maya Arad Yasur (born 1976), Israeli playwright
- Maya Yazbek (born 1967), Lebanese singer
- Maya Yukihi, Japanese professional wrestler
- Maya Zankoul (born 1986), Lebanese author, visual artist, blogger and television personality
- Queen Maya of Silla
- Maya (singer) (born 1979), South Korean K-Pop singer

== Men ==
- Maya (High Priest of Amun), a High Priest of Amun until at least year four of Akhenaten
- Maya (Treasurer) (13th century BC), the treasurer to Pharaohs Tutankhamun, Ay, and Horemheb of Egypt
- Maya (musician) (born 1979), vocalist of Japanese visual kei band LM.
- Maya Dolas (1966–1991), Indian gangster
- Maya Ranjan (1913–1968), Sinhala writer and schoolteacher from Sri Lanka
- Maya Singh Saini, Indian freedom fighter
- Maya Thevar (1934–2022), Indian politician
- Maya Yoshida (born 1988), Japanese professional footballer

== Notable animals named Maya ==
- Maya (wolf), a cloned Arctic wolf

== Fictional characters named Maya ==
- Maya (comics), an Indian DC Comics super-heroine
- Maya (Ninjago), A main character's mother in Ninjago
- Maya, the alter ego of the Marvel Comics superhero Paragon
- Maya, a recurring character in the animated series Craig of the Creek
- Maya, co-protagonist of the Pixar film Gatto
- Maya, titular protagonist in the animated miniseries Maya and the Three
- Maya, the original name given to Aelita in the French animated TV series Code Lyoko
- Maya (Azumanga Daioh), a minor character in the shōnen manga Azumanga Daioh
- Maya (Is the Order a Rabbit?), a character in the manga series Is the Order a Rabbit?
- Maya, one of the main characters in the Redakai: Conquer the Kairu franchise
- Maya, one of the main characters in Hiroki Endo's manga series Eden: It's an Endless World!
- Maya, fictional CIA intelligence analyst who tracked down Osama bin Laden from the film Zero Dark Thirty
- Maya Aida, a.k.a. Mana Aida, protagonist of Glitter Force Doki Doki/DokiDoki! Pretty Cure
- Maya Allende-Delmar, character in the 2016 graphic novel Ghosts
- Maya the Bee, the main character of the 1912 German children's book The Adventures of Maya the Bee and its various adaptions
- Maya Blart, character and daughter of the titular character in Paul Blart: Mall Cop and its sequel Paul Blart: Mall Cop 2
- Maya Dolittle, character in the Dr. Dolittle films
- Maya Hansen (character), a character in the Marvel Comics universe
- Fuuga no Maya, a character in Saint Beast
- Maya Kennedy, minor character in Futari wa Pretty Cure (originally named Mayu Kashiwada)
- Maya Leibowitz-Jenkins, recurring character in The Proud Family revival Louder and Prouder
- Maya Lopez, the Marvel Comics character known as Echo
- Maya Ibuki, a minor character in the Neon Genesis Evangelion franchise
- Maya Markowitz, a character in Raquel Palacio's Wonder
- Maya McStuffins, a character in the animated series Doc McStuffins
- Maya Santos, a character from the children's animated series Maya & Miguel
- Maya Schoppenboer, a character from the Dutch indie animated show Ongezellig
- Maya St. Germain, a secondary character in the Pretty Little Liars series of young-adult novels
- Maya Tendo, one of the main characters from the Shojo Kageki Revue Starlight franchise
- Maya Yamato, drummer of the band Pastel＊Palettes from the BanG Dream! franchise
- Maya Yamada, a character from the light novel series Infinite Stratos

=== Live action TV ===
- Maya Mehrotra/Maya Arjun Sharma, the lead character from the Sony Entertainment Television India drama series, Beyhadh
- Maya (Power Rangers), the Yellow Ranger in Power Rangers: Lost Galaxy
- Maya, an alien character on the television series Space: 1999
- Maya the Magnificent, the title elephant of the 1966 film and 1967 TV series Maya
- Maya, a minor character in Battlestar Galactica
- Maya Avant, a character from The Bold and the Beautiful
- Maya Bennett, a recurring character in the Disney Channel series The Suite Life on Deck
- Maya Chinn, a character from the American daytime soap opera Passions
- Maya Fisher, a character from the HBO TV show Six Feet Under
- Maya Gallo, a character in the NBC sitcom Just Shoot Me
- Maya Hart, a character in the Disney Channel show Girl Meets World
- Maya Herrera, a character in the NBC drama series Heroes
- Maya Ishii-Peters, the main character in the Hulu series Pen15
- Maya Matlin, a character in the teen drama Degrassi: The Next Generation
- Maya dela Rosa-Lim, a character in ABS-CBN drama series Be Careful with My Heart
- Maya Vie, a character in the sci-fi drama series The 100
- Maya Wilkes, a character from the American sitcom Girlfriends
- Maya Young, a character in the television series Kamen Rider: Dragon Knight

=== Video games ===
- Maya, a character from video game Killer Instinct 2
- Maya, one of the six playable characters in the video game Borderlands 2
- Maya, a minor antagonist in Minecraft Story Mode
- Maya Amano, a character from Persona 2: Innocent Sin
- Maya Do'Urden, a sister of Drizzt Do'Urden in Forgotten Realms
- Maya Fey, a secondary character in the Ace Attorney franchise.
- Maya Ocean, one of the four pre-made mermaids in The Sims 3: Island Paradise
- Maya Torres, one of the playable characters in State of Decay

== See also ==
- Maia (name)
- Maja (given name)
- Mia (given name)
- Mya (given name)
