= Maia (disambiguation) =

Maia /ˈmaɪ.ə/ is the eldest of the Pleiades in Greek mythology, also identified with the Roman earth goddess Maia (Roman goddess). Maia may also refer to:

== Places ==
=== New Zealand ===
- Maia, New Zealand, a suburb of the city of Dunedin, New Zealand

=== Portugal ===
- Maia, Portugal, municipality
- Cidade da Maia, a city in the municipality above
- Maia (Ribeira Grande), a parish in Ribeira Grande Municipality in the Azores, Portugal

=== Romania ===
- Maia, Ialomița, a commune in Ialomiţa County
- Maia, a village in Bobâlna Commune, Cluj County
- Maia, a village in Bereni Commune, Mureș County

=== United Kingdom ===
- Maia, a Roman fort located in Bowness-on-Solway, England

=== United States ===
- Fitiuta, American Samoa, also known as Maia

== People ==
- Maia (given name), a feminine given name
- Maia (surname), a Portuguese surname
- Maia (singer), stage name of Colombian singer Mónica Andrea Vives Orozco
- Maia (nurse), wet-nurse of ancient Egyptian king Tutankhamun
- mxmtoon (a.k.a. Maia), a singer-songwriter and social media personality

== Literature, fiction and entertainment ==
- Maia (novel), a fantasy novel by Richard Adams
- Os Maias or "The Maias", a realist novel by Eça de Queirós, named after the protagonist family
- Maia (Middle-earth), one of a race of beings in J. R. R. Tolkien's Middle-earth writings
- Maia Skouris (née Rutledge), a character on the USA Network science fiction TV show The 4400
- Maia Jeffries, a character on the New Zealand soap opera Shortland Street
- Maïa, a 1910 opera by Ruggero Leoncavallo
- Maia Sterling, a character from the Robotech anime series
- Maia, the name given to Thumbelina by her newlywed husband, the King of the Spirit of the Flowers, in Hans Christian Andersen's original fairy tale "Thumbelina"
- Maia, Queen of Hallasar and reincarnation of the goddess Laharah in the video game Summoner 2
- Maia Mizuki, the protagonist of the anime Daphne in the Brilliant Blue
- Maia or Marina Le Cille (JP ver.), is a character in the game Phantasy Star III: Generations of Doom for Genesis/Mega Drive
- Maia, a werewolf character in The Mortal Instruments by Cassandra Clare
- Maia, a fictional asteroid in The Last Policeman and its sequels by Ben H. Winters
- Maia (video game) a science fiction video game
- "Maia" (Suspect), a 2022 television episode

== Other uses ==
- Maia and Marco, one of an artificial intelligence sportscaster pair
- Maia language, a Madang language of Papua New Guinea
- Maia people, an indigenous tribe of Western Australia
- Maia (star), the fourth-brightest star in the Pleiades open-star cluster
- F.C. Maia, a Portuguese football club
- Short S.21 Maia, a piggyback long-range flying boat combination
- "-maia" or "maia-", an affix derived from the mythological Maia, used to describe maternal roles in taxonomy
- Multi-Angle Imager for Aerosols, a future NASA earth-orbiting instrument operated by the Jet Propulsion Laboratory
- Maia (rocket), a reusable launch vehicle by MaiaSpace, subsidiary of ArianeGroup

== See also ==
- Maïa (disambiguation)
- MAIA (disambiguation)
- Majo, or Maja, terms for people from the lower classes of Spanish society
- Maja (disambiguation)
- Mya (disambiguation)
- Maya (disambiguation)
- Maiasaura, a dinosaur named after the mythological goddess
