= Mia =

Mia, Mía, MIA, or M.I.A. may refer to:

== Arts and media ==
=== Music ===
==== Artists ====
- M.I.A. (rapper) (born 1975), English rapper and singer
- M.I.A. (American band), 1980s punk rock band from Orange County, California
- MIA. (German band), a German rock/pop band formed in 1997
- Mia (singer) (born 1983), Lithuanian singer and television presenter

==== Songs ====
- "Mía" (Armando Manzanero song), 1967
- "Mia" (Bad Bunny song), 2018
- "Mía" (Paulina Rubio song), 2004
- "Mía" (Tito El Bambino song), 2007
- "M.I.A" (Cher Lloyd song), 2019
- "Mia", by Aerosmith from Night in the Ruts, 1979
- "Mia", by Chevelle from Point No. 1, 1999
- "Mia", by Emmy the Great from First Love, 2009
- "Mia", by Gorki from Gorky, 1992
- "Mia", by IU from Lost and Found, 2008
- "Mia", by Sergio Bruni, 1967
- "Mia", by Snail Mail from Valentine, 2021
- "M.I.A.", by Avenged Sevenfold from City of Evil, 2005
- "MIA", by Travis Scott from Owl Pharaoh, 2013
- "M.I.A.", by the Foo Fighters from There Is Nothing Left to Lose, 1999
- "M.I.A." by Katseye from Beautiful Chaos, 2025
- "M.I.A.", by M.I.A. from Arular, 2005
- "M.I.A.", by 7 Year Bitch from ¡Viva Zapata!, 1994
- "M.I.A" by Stray Kids from I Am Who, 2018
- "M.I.A" by Sumo Cyco from Initiation, 2021
- "Le Mia", by IAM

==== Other uses in music ====
- Music Industry Awards, a Belgian music industry award

=== Other uses in arts and media ===
- Mia (film), 2023
- Mia (game), a dice game
- M.I.A. (TV series), an American crime drama television series
- M.I.A.: Mission in Asia, 2009 video game
- "M.I.A." (Quantum Leap), a 1990 television episode
- Misfits in Action, a wrestling stable

== Businesses and organizations ==
- Mia electric, former French carmaker
- Malaysian Institute of Accountants
- Marxists Internet Archive
- Media Information Agency of the Republic of Macedonia
- Michigan Islamic Academy, Ann Arbor, US
- Ministry of Internal Affairs (Russia)
- Minneapolis Institute of Art, Minnesota, US
- Montgomery Improvement Association, Alabama, US
- Mouvement Islamique Armé, an Algerian Islamic terrorist group active in the 1980s and 90s
- Mutual Improvement Association (disambiguation), various bodies
- Mexican Insurgent Army, a Mexican leftist-paramilitary organization

== People ==
- Mia (given name), including a list of people and fictional characters with the given name
- Mia (surname), including a list of people and fictional characters with the surname

== Places ==
- Mia-dong, a neighbourhood (dong) in Seoul, South Korea
- Murrumbidgee Irrigation Area, New South Wales, Australia

== Science and technology ==
- MIA (gene), which encodes melanoma-derived growth regulatory protein
- Magnetic immunoassay, a biochemical test
- Middle Iron Age, an archaeological period

== Transportation ==
- Mia Station, a subway station in Seoul, South Korea
- MIA station, an LRT station in Parañaque, Philippines
- Miami International Airport's IATA code
- Manchester Airport station's station code

== Other uses ==
- Asunción International Marathon, known by its acronym as MIA (Spanish: Maratón Internacional de Asunción)
- Master of International Affairs, a degree
- Medically indigent adult, a US person without healthcare
- Missing in action, a casualty classification
- Multilateral Agreement on Investment, an agreement between members of the OECD

== See also ==
- Mornington Island Art, or MIArt, an Indigenous Australian art centre
- Mya (disambiguation)
