= Riddle (disambiguation) =

A riddle is a form of word puzzle.

Riddle may also refer to:

== People ==
- Riddle (surname), including a list of people with the name
- Riki LeCotey, a Canadian cosplayer who uses the pseudonym "Riddle"
- Riddles (surname)

== Places in the United States ==
- Riddle, Idaho, an unincorporated community
- Riddle, Indiana, an unincorporated community
- Riddle, Oregon, a city in Douglas County
- Riddle, West Virginia, an unincorporated community
- Riddle Run, a tributary of the Allegheny River in Pennsylvania

== Film and TV ==
- Riddler (The Batman)
- Riddle (film), a 2013 movie starring Val Kilmer
- "Riddles" (Star Trek: Voyager), a 1999 episode of Star Trek: Voyager

== Music ==
- Riddle, a 1999 album by Thomas Leeb, and the title song
- Mystery (Faye Wong album), also known as Riddle, 1994
- The Riddle (album), a 1984 album by Nik Kershaw, and the title song
- "Riddle" (song), a single by En Vogue from the 2000 album Masterpiece Theatre

== Other ==
- Riddle (tool), a large sieve used to separate finer from coarser particles of soil or compost
- Riddle Airlines, an American airline founded in 1945
- The Riddle Song, also known as "I Gave My Love a Cherry," an English folk song
- World riddle, of Friedrich Nietzsche, the meaning of life

== See also ==
- Riddle of the Sphinx (disambiguation)
- Riddling, a process in the production of sparkling wine
