= Mia (given name) =

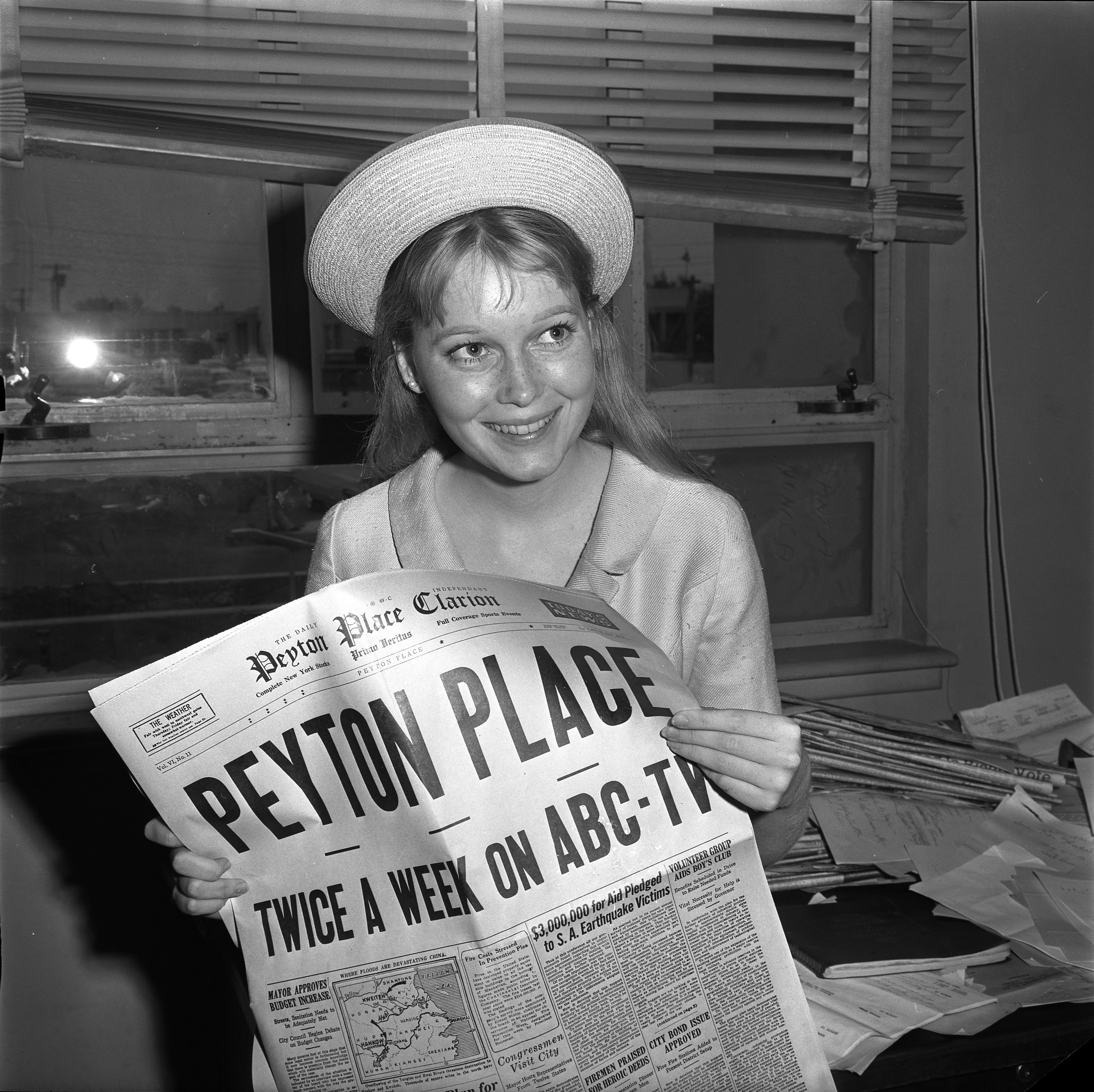
- American actress Mia Farrow (born 1945), pictured in 1964. The name Mia increased in use following Farrow’s 1964 debut as Allison MacKenzie on the American television soap opera Peyton Place.
- Pronunciation: /ˈmaɪə/ MY-ə /ˈmiːə/ MEE-ə
- Gender: Feminine

Origin
- Meaning: Diminutive of Maria

Other names
- Related names: Maia, Maja, Maya, Mea, Meah, Miah, Mya, Myah

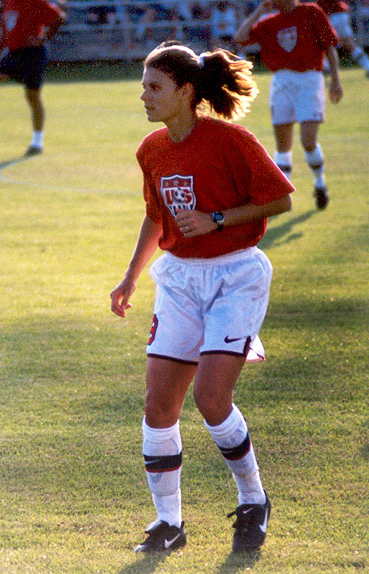
American professional soccer player Mia Hamm (born 1972), pictured in 1998

Mia is a feminine given name in popular use worldwide. It originated as a diminutive of Maria and other names such as Amelia and Emilia, and was rarely used as an independent given name prior to the 20th century.

The name is often confused with Maia and Maya, both of which can be derived from other sources. The name Mya, which also can be derived from multiple sources, has been used as a spelling variant of Mia as well as of Maya and Maia. The name Mia can also sometimes share the pronunciation MY-ə with the names Maia, Maya, and Mya, though it is more commonly pronounced MEE-ə, with a long e sound.

== Cultural influences ==
The pronunciation MEE-ə was popularized in the 20th century due the use of the Italian possessive word mia, meaning “my”, in popular love song titles such as Rosa Mia, released in 1938, and the 1954 hit song Cara Mia. English speakers who heard the song Cara Mia likely misinterpreted the Mia in the song titles as a woman's name. Mia was first used for five or more girls in the United States in 1938 after the release of Rosa Mia, and increased significantly in use in the late 1950s after the release of Cara Mia. The name Mia first appeared among the 1,000 most popular names for newborn girls in the United States in 1964, the year American actress Mia Farrow debuted as smart, pretty teenaged Allison MacKenzie on the American television soap opera Peyton Place. The name increased from 104 uses for American girls born in 1963 to 1,054 uses for American girls born in 1965. Farrow, for whom Mia is a nickname for Maria de Lourdes, appeared on the soap opera until 1966.

The name has remained among the top 1,000 names for American girls since 1964, but dropped in use slightly after 1968, when Farrow appeared in the Satanic-themed horror film Rosemary's Baby. The name increased again in popularity in the mid- to late 1970s after the release of the 1975 hit song Mamma Mia. Other popular culture influences affected continued use of the name. Mia also increased in use after American actress Mia Sara appeared in the 1986 American comedy film Ferris Bueller's Day Off. American professional soccer player Mia Hamm, for whom Mia is a diminutive of Mariel, and the character of Amelia "Mia" Thermopolis in the 2001 American film The Princess Diaries based on the best-selling young adult novel series by American author Meg Cabot, also influenced use of the name in the United States. The name Mia or Mía became particularly popular for girls in Spanish-speaking families in North and South America due to Mía Colucci, a character played by Mexican actress Anahí in the popular Mexican telenovela Rebelde, which aired from 2004 to 2006. Mia was the most popular name for baby girls born to Hispanic and Latina mothers in the U.S. state of Virginia in 2024. Overall, it was the seventh most popular name for girls born in the state in 2024.

== Usage ==
Mia has been among the 10 most popular names for newborn girls in the United States since 2009 and has been similarly popular in Canada and Mexico. The name has been similarly popular in the 2010s and 2020s elsewhere in the Anglosphere, including in Australia, Ireland, New Zealand, and the United Kingdom. It is also a popular name throughout Europe, ranking on popularity charts in Austria, Belgium, Bosnia and Herzegovina, Croatia, Czech Republic, Denmark, Estonia, France, Germany, Hungary, Italy, Latvia, Moldova, Netherlands, North Macedonia, Norway, Poland, Portugal, Slovakia, Slovenia, Spain, and Switzerland. It is also a popular name in South American countries. The name Mia has appeared on popularity charts in Argentina, Chile, and Uruguay, among other countries.

== Notable individuals ==
=== Given name ===
- Mia Alvar, Filipino–American writer
- Mia Bitsch, German karateka
- Mia Boman (born 1975), Swedish curler and curling coach
- Mia Brownell (born 1971), American visual artist
- Mia Carlsson (born 1990), Swedish soccer player
- Mia Clift (born 2004), Australian snowboarder
- Mía Cueva (born 2011), Mexican diver
- Mia Davies (born 1978), Australian politician
- Mia Falkenberg (born 1983), Danish politician
- Mia Farrow (born 1945), American actress
- Mia Goth (born 1993), English actress
- Mia Hagman (born 1979), Finnish breaststroke swimmer
- Mia Isabella, American pornographic actress
- Mia Kilburg (born 1989), American speed skater and professional racing cyclist
- Mia Kirshner (born 1975), Canadian actress
- Mia Kretzer (born 2014), Australian skateboarder
- Mia Kupres (born 2004), Canadian tennis player
- Mia Love (born Ludmya; 1975–2025), American politician
- Mia Makaroff (born 1970), Finnish composer
- Mia Mamede (born 1995), Brazilian model, actress, and beauty pageant titleholder
- Mia Malkova (born 1992), American media personality and pornographic actress
- Mia Mastrov (born 2003), American basketball player
- Mia May (1884–1980), Austrian actress
- Mia Michaels (born 1966), American choreographer
- Mia Mottley (born 1965), Barbadian Prime Minister
- Mia Münster (1894–1970), German artist
- Mia Newley (born 1988), Australian basketball player
- Mia Persson (born 1990), Swedish footballer
- Mia Pohánková (born 2008), Slovak tennis player
- Mia Pojatina (born 1995), Croatian model
- Mia Riddle, American singer and songwriter
- Mia Rodriguez (born 2002), Australian singer-songwriter
- Mia Sara (born 1967), American actress
- Mia Schmid (born 2005), Swiss footballer
- Mia Strömmer (born 1974), Finnish hammer thrower
- Mia Talerico (born 2008), American actress
- Mia Tavonatti, American artist and writer
- Mia Tharia (born 2005), English actress and theatre maker
- Mia Threapleton (born 2000), English actress
- Mia Tomlinson (born 1995), English actress
- Mia Tyler (born 1978), American actress and model
- Mia Wasikowska (born 1989), Australian actress
- Mia Wray (born 1995), Australian singer and songwriter
- Mia Yamamoto (born 1943), American attorney and civil rights activist
- Mia Zabelka (born 1963), Austrian violinist, improviser, and composer
- Mia Zapata (1965–1993), American musician
- Mia Zutter (born 1999), American Paralympic athlete

=== Hypocoristic ===
- Mia Aegerter (Myriam), Swiss pop singer and actress
- Mia Farrow (María), American actress
- Mia Hamm (Mariel Margaret), American soccer (football) player, eponym of the Mia Hamm Foundation
- Mia Matthes (Mariette, 1920–2010), Canadian photographer
- Mia Rose (Maria), British-Portuguese singer

=== Pseudonyms ===
- Mia (singer), Lithuanian singer and television presenter
- Mia Couto, pseudonym of António Emílio Leite Couto, Mozambican novelist
- Mia Khalifa (born 1993), American media personality and former pornographic actress
- Mia Martini, pseudonym of Domenica Berté, Italian singer
- Mia Murano (未亜), Japanese model and actress
- Mia X, American rapper, singer-songwriter and actress

== Fictional characters ==
- Baby Mia, Molly's baby sister that first appears in "Bubble Baby!" in the American animated television series Bubble Guppies
- Mia, an English Setter in the Australian series Bluey (TV series)
- Mia (.hack)
- Mia (Dark Tower)
- Mia, a lead character from Lego Friends
- Mia, the titular character from Mia and Me
- Mia, in the 2016 American film La La Land
- Mia, a Fire Emblem: Path of Radiance character
- Mia, a Golden Sun character
- Mia, a mouse, the lead character in Mia's Big Adventure Collection educational software series
- Mia (Two and a Half Men), a character on the television show Two and a Half Men
- Mia Allen, from The Evil Dead
- Mia Ausa, a Lunar: Silver Star Story Complete character
- Mia Dearden, a comic book character
- Mía Colucci, in the Argentine telenovela Rebelde Way (2002–03)
- Mía Colucci, in the Mexican telenovela Rebelde (2004–06)
- Mia Dolan, main character in La La Land, played by Emma Stone
- Mia Elliott, on the American soap opera Love Is a Many Splendored Thing
- Mia Fey, a Phoenix Wright character
- Mia Hall, main character of novel and film of If I Stay
- Mia Havero, main character and narrator of Alexei Panshin's 1968 Nebula Award-winning novel Rite of Passage
- Mia Jones, a Degrassi: The Next Generation character
- Mia Lewis, in the TV series Californication
- Mia Rio, in Yandere Simulator
- Mia St. Clair, an American Girl character
- Mia Taylor, a character in the media project Nijigasaki High School Idol Club
- Mia Thermopolis, a main character in The Princess Diaries and The Princess Diaries 2: Royal Engagement
- Mia Toretto, a main character in The Fast and The Furious
- Mia Townsend, a Need for Speed: Most Wanted character
- Mia Wallace, a Pulp Fiction character
- Mia Warren, a character in Celeste Ng's 2017 novel Little Fires Everywhere and in the 2020 miniseries of the same name
- Mia Watanabe, from Power Rangers Samurai
- Mia Winters, a Resident Evil 7 and Resident Evil 8 character
- Mia Karnstein, from Code Vein
- Mia the Kitten, in the American animated television series T.O.T.S.
- Mia Sutton, a main character from Death Note (2017 film)

== See also ==
- Pia Mia (born 1996), American singer, songwriter, model, and actress
- Mia (surname)
