= Maja =

Maja may refer to:

== People ==
- Maja (given name), a feminine given name (includes a list of people with the name)
- Charles Maja (1966–2020), South African actor
- Josh Maja (born 1998), English footballer
- Otto Maja (born 1987), Finnish street artist
- Maja, the feminine form of majo, a low-class Spaniard of the 18th and 19th century

== Places ==
- Maja, Croatia, a village near Glina
- Maja, Banten, a subdistrict in Lebak Regency, Banten, Indonesia
  - Maja railway station
- Maja, West Java, a subdistrict in Majalengka Regency, West Java, Indonesia
- Maja (Angke), a tributary of the Angke River, Jakarta, Indonesia
- Maja (peak), a mountain peak in Kosovo
- Maja (Crasna), a river in Romania
- Mája, the Hungarian name for Maia village, Bereni Commune, Mureș County, Romania
- 66 Maja, a main-belt asteroid
- Maja (Glina), a tributary to the Glina in Croatia

== Animals ==
- Maja (boa constrictor), a species in the Cuban cactus scrub
- Maja (crab), a genus of crabs in the family Majidae

== See also ==
- Maia (disambiguation)
- La maja desnuda, a painting by Spanish artist Francisco Goya
- La maja vestida, a painting by Spanish artist Francisco Goya
- Majaa, 2005 Indian Tamil-language action film
- Maya (disambiguation)
- Mya (disambiguation)
