= MIA3 =

Protein-coding gene in the species Homo sapiens

Identifiers
- Aliases: MIA3, ARNT, D320, TANGO, TANGO1, UNQ6077, melanoma inhibitory activity family member 3, MIA family member 3, ER export factor, MIA SH3 domain ER export factor 3, ODCD2
- External IDs: OMIM: 613455; MGI: 2443183; GeneCards: MIA3

Gene location (Human)
Chr.	Chromosome 1 (human)
Band	1q41	Start	222,618,097 bp
Band	1q41	End	222,668,007 bp
RNA expression pattern
Bgee	Human / Mouse (ortholog); Top expressed in: Achilles tendon; body of pancreas; stromal cell of endometrium; gastric mucosa; minor salivary glands; right lobe of liver; rectum; body of uterus; canal of the cervix; left coronary artery / n/a; More reference expression data
BioGPS	n/a
Gene ontology
Molecular function	protein binding; cargo receptor activity
Cellular component	integral component of membrane; endoplasmic reticulum membrane; membrane; endoplasmic reticulum; endoplasmic reticulum exit site; Golgi membrane; endoplasmic reticulum lumen; intracellular membrane-bounded organelle
Biological process	protein transport; negative regulation of cell adhesion; negative regulation of cell migration; wound healing; vesicle-mediated transport; positive regulation of leukocyte migration; exocytosis; endoplasmic reticulum to Golgi vesicle-mediated transport; COPII-coated vesicle cargo loading; lipoprotein transport; post-translational protein modification; transport; cell migration involved in sprouting angiogenesis; endoplasmic reticulum organization; protein secretion; vesicle cargo loading; protein localization to endoplasmic reticulum exit site; cellular response to oxidised low-density lipoprotein particle stimulus; negative regulation of leukocyte cell-cell adhesion; negative regulation of lymphocyte migration; endocytosis
Sources:Amigo / QuickGO
Orthologs
Databases	NCBI: entry; OMA: entry
Species	Human	Mouse
Entrez	375056	338366
Ensembl	ENSG00000154305	ENSMUSG00000056050
UniProt	Q5JRA6	Q8BI84
RefSeq (mRNA)	NM_001300867; NM_198551; NM_001324062; NM_001324063; NM_001324064 NM_001324065	NM_177389
RefSeq (protein)	NP_001287796; NP_001310991; NP_001310992; NP_001310993; NP_001310994 NP_940953	NP_796363
Location (UCSC)	Chr 1: 222.62 – 222.67 Mb	n/a
PubMed search
- Wikidata
View/Edit Human	View/Edit Mouse

Melanoma inhibitory activity protein 3 (MIA3), also known as transport and Golgi organization protein 1 (TANGO1), is a protein that in humans is encoded by the MIA3 gene on chromosome 1. It is ubiquitously expressed in many tissues and cell types. MIA3 localizes to the endoplasmic reticulum (ER) exit site, where it binds bulky cargo molecules such as collagens and creates mega transport carriers for the export of cargoes from the ER. This function suggests that it plays a role in assembly of extracellular matrix (ECM) and bone formation. MIA3 has been demonstrated to contribute to both tumor suppression and progression. The MIA3 gene also contains one of 27 loci associated with increased risk of coronary artery disease.. A TANGO1 like protein called TALI is expressed in liver and intestine and shown to be required for the export of bulky very Low density lipoproteins (VLDL) and chylomicrons. TANGO1 and TALI assemble into rings around COPII coats and this function is necessary for export of bulky cargoes. The discovery of TANGO1 and understanding its function has revealed that cargo export from the ER is not be vesicles but involves transient tunnels between the ER exit site and the next compartment of the secretory pathway. Biallelic Mutations in TANGO1 cause syndrome disease and complete loss of TANGO1 leads of defects in bone mineralization. These findings highlight the significance of TANGO1 in building and ER exit site, controlling the quantities and quality of cargo exported, which is necessary for life.Membrane permeant peptides of TANGO1 affect hyper collagen secretion in normal and cells of patients with scleroderma, and in a zebra fish model of wound healing. These findings raise the possibility of targeting TANGO1 to control skin scarring, wound healing and fibrosis.

== Structure ==
=== Gene ===
The MIA3 gene resides on chromosome 1 at the band 1q41 and includes 32 exons. This gene produces 4 isoforms through alternative splicing.

=== Protein ===
MIA3 is a member of the MIA/OTOR family. The full-length protein spans 1,907 amino acids and localizes to the ER exit sites. It contains an N-terminal, SH3-like domain, two predicted transmembrane domains, a coiled-coiled domain, and a C-terminal, proline-rich domain. The SH3-like domain faces the ER lumen, where it can bind cargo for COPII carrier biogenesis, while the proline-rich domain faces the cytoplasm, where it can bind the COPII components Sec23/24. Of the two predicted transmembrane domains, only one actually crosses the membrane, whereas the second likely forms a hairpin structure that is only embedded in but not crossing the membrane.

== Function ==
Unlike other members in the MIA gene family, MIA3 is broadly expressed, except in the cells belonging to the hematopoietic system. High levels of MIA3 expression are observed both in embryonic and adult tissues. MIA3 resides at the ER exit site and functions as a guide for loading the cargo molecule collagen VII into COPII carriers, which mediates the exit of secretory protein out of the ER with the help of cutaneous T-cell lymphoma–associated antigen 5 (cTAGE-5). A recent study indicates that MIA3 is also involved in the secretion of other collagens, including collagens I, II, III, IV, and IX, from chondrocytes, fibroblasts, endothelial cells, and mural cells, indicating its participation in chondrocyte maturation and bone mineralization. MIA3 has been suggested as a tumor suppressor in melanoma, colorectal cancer, and hepatoma, and induction of expression of MIA3 results in a significant decrease in motility and invasive potential. On the other hand, it has also been found that MIA3 promotes angiogenesis and lymphangiogenesis by upregulating platelet-derived growth factor beta (PDGF-b) polypeptide and neuropolin 2 in oral squamous cell carcinoma.

== Clinical significance ==
In humans, MIA3 was first discovered as an important constituent in the growth and adhesion in melanoma cells. As it is secreted from both chondrocytes and melanoma cells, it also plays a role in the metastasis of melanomas as well as cartilage development. It has been established that melanoma inhibitory gene family members serve several tumor-related functions that are subjected to a variety of human malignancies.

=== Clinical Marker ===
It was found that melanoma inhibitory activity gene family members are frequently expressed in human tumors such as squamous cell carcinoma, esophageal squamous cell carcinoma, lung cancer with nodal or distant metastasis and cervical cancer. In addition, melanoma inhibitory activity gene family expression is also associated with poor prognosis among cancer patients overall. Nevertheless, further research is needed to determine the association between melanoma inhibitory family member expression and its diagnostic, prognostic and therapeutic relevance in clinical oncology.

Additionally, a multi-locus genetic risk score study, based on a combination of 27 loci including the MIA3 gene, identified individuals at increased risk for both incidence and recurrent coronary artery disease events, as well as an enhanced clinical benefit from statin therapy. The study was based on a community cohort study (the Malmo Diet and Cancer study) and four additional randomized controlled trials of primary prevention cohorts (JUPITER and ASCOT) and secondary prevention cohorts (CARE and PROVE IT-TIMI 22).
