= Aitana =

Aitana may refer to:

- Aitana (given name), including a list of people with the name
- Aitana (singer) (born 1999), Spanish singer
- Aitana (mountain), mountain in Spain
- Aitana FC, East Timor football club
