= Mya (given name) =

- Gender: Primarily female

Origin
- Meaning: A modern, English phonetic variant of Maya or Mia or emerald in Burmese.

Other names
- Related names: Maia, Maya, Mia

Mya is a primarily feminine given name of uncertain origins. One source considers it to be a 20th-century phonetic spelling of the name Maya or Mia, names that have multiple, different meanings and origins in different languages. The American poet and civil rights activist Maya Angelou, born Marguerite, is said to have acquired her nickname as a child when her brother referred to her as "mya sister". Mya is also a Burmese name of a different origin, said by one source to mean emerald, in use for both sexes.

== Usage ==
The name has been ranked among the top one thousand names for newborn girls in the United States since 1997 and was among the two hundred most used names for American girls between 1999 and 2018.

== Notable people ==
- Mya Aye (Burmese: မြအေး), born 1966, Burmese activist and one of the leaders of the 8888 generation of pro-democracy student activists in Burma (Myanmar)
- Mya Aye (Burmese: မြအေး), (1942–2013), Burmese educator and Minister of Education from 2011 to 2013
- Mya Aye, Burmese professional golfer, born 1940
- Mya Azzopardi, born 2002, Maltese swimmer
- Mya Baker, born 1974, also known as Mya B., American filmmaker, poet, writer, director and researcher
- Mya Bollaers, Belgian actress
- Mya Breitbart, American biologist and professor of biological oceanography at the University of South Florida's College of Marine Science
- Mya Byrne, born 1978, American singer-songwriter
- Mya-Rose Craig, born 2002, British-Bangladeshi ornithologist and campaigner for equal rights
- Mya Diamond, born 1981, Hungarian pornographic actress and erotic model.
- Mya Harrison, known by the stage name Mýa, American R & B singer, born 1979
- Mya-Lecia Naylor (2002–2019), English actress, model and singer
- Mya Rose, born 1979, American indie folk-alternative artist
- Mya Sein, (Burmese: ဒေါ်မြစိန်) (1904–1988), Burmese writer, educator and historian
- Mya Taylor, born 1991, American actress and singer
- Mya Than Tint (Burmese: မြသန်းတင့်, MLCTS: mra. san: tang. (1929–1998), five-time Myanmar National Literature Award winning Burmese writer and translator
- Mya Thwe Thwe Khine (Burmese: မြသွဲ့သွဲ့ခိုင်) (2001–2021), a young Burmese woman who became the first known casualty of the 2021 Myanmar protests, which formed in the aftermath of the 2021 Myanmar coup d'état
- Mya Thwin (Burmese: မြသွင်) (1925–2017), Theravada Buddhist meditation teacher who has established centres for vipassana meditation around the world
- Mya Tun Oo (Burmese: မြထွန်းဦး), born 1961, Myanmar's incumbent Minister for Defence
