= Aitana (given name) =

Spanish feminine given name

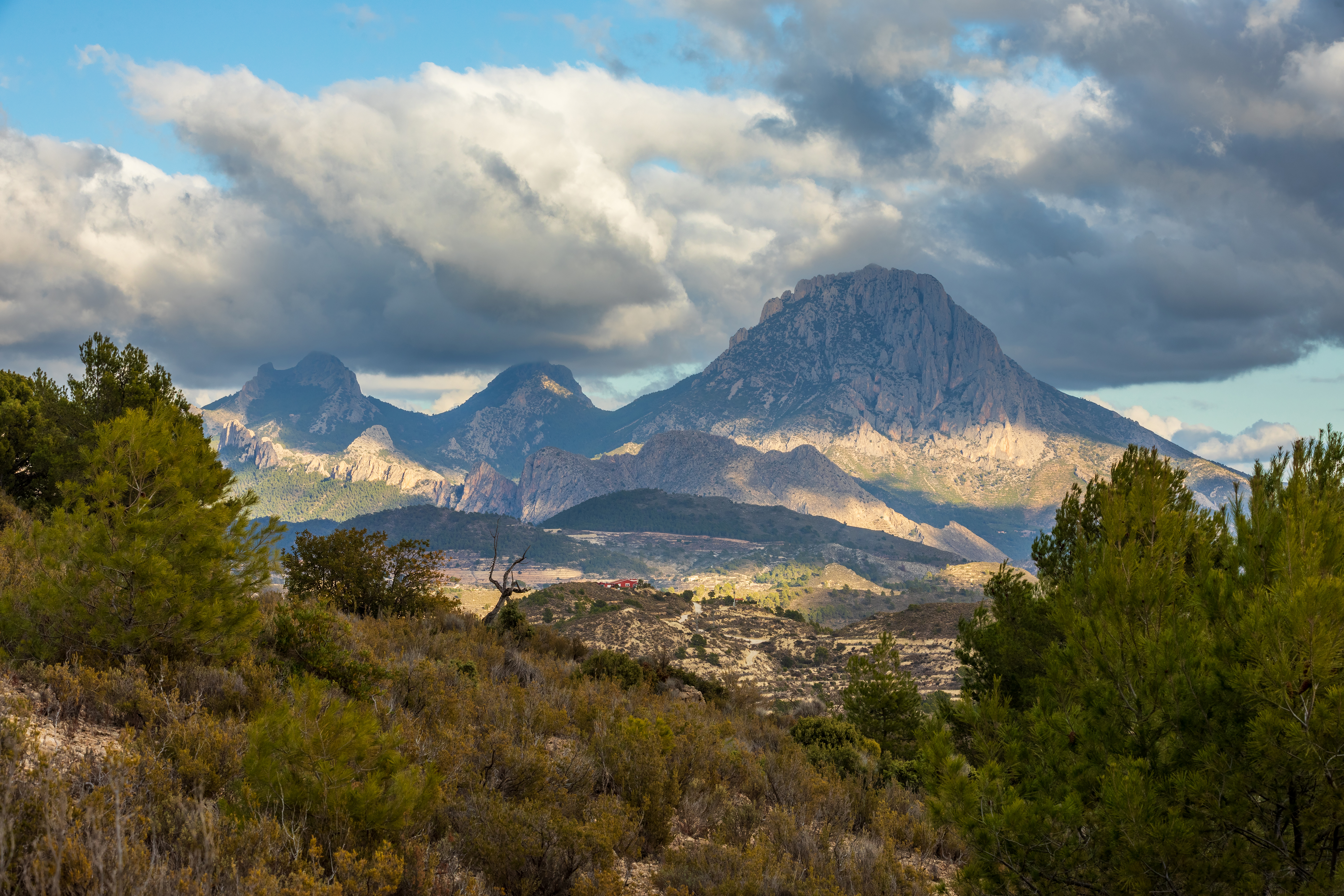
- Sierra de Aitana.
- Pronunciation: English: /aɪˈtɑːnɑː/
- Gender: Feminine
- Language: Spanish

Origin
- Meaning: Derived from a place name, Sierra de Aitana in Spain
- Region of origin: Spain

Aitana is a Spanish feminine given name. The personal name is derived from a Spanish place name, Sierra de Aitana. The exiled Spanish poet Rafael Alberti first used the name for his daughter in 1941 to commemorate his last view of his home country before he went into exile following the Spanish Civil War.

Aitana is a currently popular name among Spanish speakers. It was among the top 10 names for newborn girls in 2024 in Bolivia, Ecuador, Honduras, Paraguay, Peru, and Uruguay, has been among the top 50 names for girls in Spain since 2002, was among the top 25 names in Mexico in 2021 and 2022, and in Argentina in 2021, and has been among the top 1,000 names for girls in the United States since 2015 and among the top 100 names for girls in Puerto Rico since 2018.

Aitana López was the name chosen for a Spanish influencer created by an advertising agency using Artificial Intelligence (AI). The realistic looking influencer was designed to resemble an extroverted 25-year-old woman with dyed pink hair. Her creators named Aitana and Maia Lima, a second AI-created model, because both names contain the letters “AI”.

== Women ==
- Aitana Alberti León (1941–2026), Argentinean-born anthropologist and poet and daughter of Spanish poet Rafael Alberti and writer María Teresa León
- Aitana Bonmatí (born 1998), Catalan professional footballer from Spain
- Aitana Ocaña Morales (born 1999), Spanish singer, actress, and songwriter known professionally as Aitana
- Aitana Sánchez-Gijón (born 1968), Spanish and Italian film actress
