= Maya Gold (disambiguation) =

Maya Gold (born 1981) is a Hungarian actress.

Maya Gold may also refer to:

- Maya Gold, a chocolate brand produced by Green & Black's.
- "Maya Gold", the thirteenth movement of Mike Oldfield's Tubular Bells II
- The 2.2.2 release of the Amarok media player
