= Maïa =

Maïa is a variant of Maia. It may refer to:

- Maïa (singer), Canadian singer, part of Canadian band Ladies of the Canyon
- Maïa Hirsch (born 2003), French basketball player
- Maïa Schwinghammer (born 2001), Canadian freestyle skier
- Maïa Vidal (born 1988), American singer-songwriter
- Maia (rocket), proposed French vehicle

== See also ==
- Maia (disambiguation)
