= SH3 domain =

Small protein domain found in some kinases and GTPases

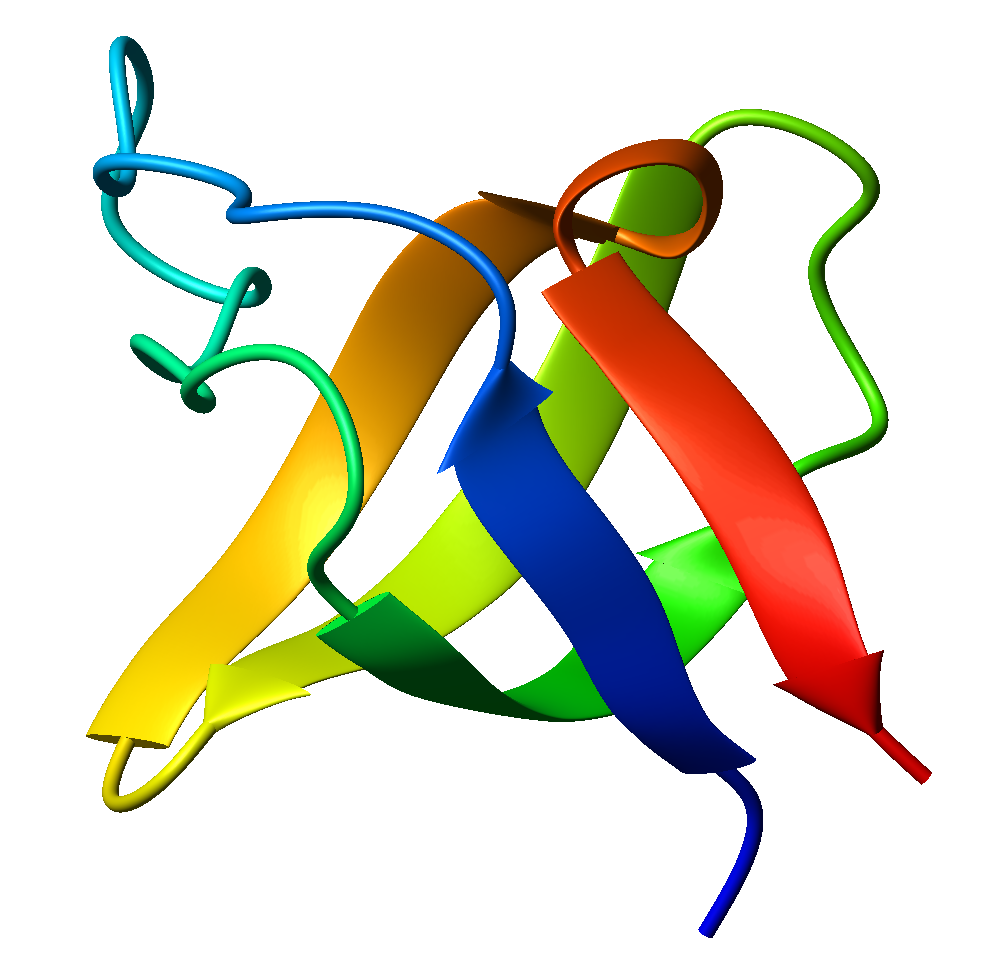
- Ribbon diagram of the SH3 domain, alpha spectrin, from chicken (PDB accession code 1SHG), colored from blue (N-terminus) to red (C-terminus).

Identifiers
- Symbol: SH3_1
- Pfam: PF00018
- Pfam clan: CL0010
- ECOD: 4.1.1
- InterPro: IPR001452
- SMART: SM00326
- PROSITE: PS50002
- SCOP2: 1shf / SCOPe / SUPFAM
- CDD: cd00174
Available protein structures:
- PDB: IPR001452 PF00018 (ECOD; PDBsum)
- AlphaFold: IPR001452; PF00018

The SRC Homology 3 domain (or SH3 domain) is a small protein domain of about 60 amino acid residues. Initially, SH3 was described as a conserved sequence in the viral adaptor protein v-Crk. This domain is also present in the molecules of phospholipase and several cytoplasmic tyrosine kinases such as Abl and Src. It has also been identified in several other protein families such as: PI3 Kinase, Ras GTPase-activating protein, CDC24 and cdc25. SH3 domains are found in proteins of signaling pathways regulating the cytoskeleton, the Ras protein, and the Src kinase and many others. The SH3 proteins interact with adaptor proteins and tyrosine kinases. Interacting with tyrosine kinases, SH3 proteins usually bind far away from the active site. Approximately 300 SH3 domains are found in proteins encoded in the human genome. In addition to that, the SH3 domain is responsible for controlling protein-protein interactions in signal transduction pathways and regulating the interactions of proteins involved in cytoplasmic signaling.

== Structure ==
The SH3 domain has a characteristic beta-barrel fold that consists of five or six β-strands arranged as two tightly packed anti-parallel β sheets. The linker regions may contain short helices. The SH3-type fold is an ancient fold found in eukaryotes as well as prokaryotes.

== Peptide binding ==
The classical SH3 domain is usually found in proteins that interact with other proteins and mediate assembly of specific protein complexes, typically via binding to proline-rich peptides in their respective binding partner. Classical SH3 domains are restricted in humans to intracellular proteins, although the small human MIA family of extracellular proteins also contain a domain with an SH3-like fold.

Many SH3-binding epitopes of proteins have a consensus sequence that can be represented as a regular expression or Short linear motif:

-X-P-p-X-P-
 1 2 3 4 5

with 1 and 4 being aliphatic amino acids, 2 and 5 always and 3 sometimes being proline. The sequence binds to the hydrophobic pocket of the SH3 domain. More recently, SH3 domains that bind to a core consensus motif R-x-x-K have been described. Examples are the C-terminal SH3 domains of adaptor proteins like Grb2 and Mona (a.k.a. Gads, Grap2, Grf40, GrpL etc.). Other SH3 binding motifs have emerged and are still emerging in the course of various molecular studies, highlighting the versatility of this domain.

== SH3 interactomes ==
SH3 domain-mediated protein-protein interaction networks, i.e., SH3 interactomes, revealed that worm SH3 interactome resembles the analogous yeast network because it is significantly enriched for proteins with roles in endocytosis. Nevertheless, orthologous SH3 domain-mediated interactions are highly rewired between worm and yeast.

== Proteins with SH3 domain ==
- Signal transducing adaptor proteins
- CDC24
- Cdc25
- PI3 kinase
- Phospholipase
- Ras GTPase-activating protein
- Vav proto-oncogene
- GRB2
- p54 S6 kinase 2 (S6K2)
- SH3D21
- ARMH3 (potentially)
- STAC3
- Some myosins
- SH3 and multiple ankyrin repeat domains: SHANK1, SHANK2, SHANK3
- YAP1
- ARHGAP12
- vexin (VXN)
- TANGO1
- Integrase
- Focal Adhesion Kinase (FAK, PTK2)
- Proline-rich tyrosine kinase (Pyk2, CADTK, PTK2beta)
- TRIP10 (cip4)
- PSD-95

== See also ==
- Src homology 2 domain-containing
- Structural domain
