= Riddle (surname) =

Riddle is a surname. Notable people with the name include:

- Albert G. Riddle (1816–1902), U.S. Representative for Ohio
- Almeda Riddle (1898–1986), American folk singer
- Chase Riddle (1925–2011), American baseball player, coach, manager, and scout
- Edward Riddle (1788–1854), English astronomer and mathematician
- Ernest Riddle (1873–1939), Australian banker
- George R. Riddle (1817–1867), American lawyer-politician
- Howard Riddle (born 1947), English judge
- Jeff C. Riddle (1863–1941), American Indian historian of the Modoc War
- Jeremy Riddle (b. 1977), American Christian musician
- Jimmy Riddle (1918–1982), American country musician
- John Paul Riddle (1901–1989), co-founder of Embry-Riddle Aeronautical University
- Johnny Riddle (1905–1998), American baseball player
- J. T. Riddle (born 1991), American baseball player
- Lincoln Ware Riddle (1880–1921), American botanist
- Matt Riddle (born 1986), American professional wrestler and mixed martial artist
- Mia Riddle, American indie-folk singer-songwriter
- Nelson Riddle (1921–1985), American bandleader
- Oscar Riddle (1877–1968), American biologist
- Paul T. Riddle (born 1953), original drummer of The Marshall Tucker Band
- Robert M. Riddle (1812–1858), mayor of Pittsburgh, Pennsylvania
- Ruth Riddle (1964–), Canadian Branch Davidian
- Samuel Riddle (1800–1888), textile manufacturer in Glen Riddle, Pennsylvania
- Samuel D. Riddle (1861–1951), stable owner at Glen Riddle Farm
- Stu Riddle (born 1976), New Zealand footballer
- Theodate Pope Riddle (1867–1946), American architect
- Toby Riddle (1848–1920), Modoc interpreter
- Troy Riddle (born 1981), American ice hockey player

== Fictional characters ==
- Lord Voldemort, the primary antagonist in J. K. Rowling's Harry Potter books, who was born "Tom Marvolo Riddle".

== See also ==
- Riddles (surname)
