= VXN =

Protein-coding gene in humans

Identifiers
- Aliases: VXN, chromosome 8 open reading frame 46, C8orf46, vexin
- External IDs: MGI: 1924232; GeneCards: VXN

Gene location (Human)
Chr.	Chromosome 8 (human)
Band	8q13.1	Start	66,493,520 bp
Band	8q13.1	End	66,518,524 bp

Gene location (Mouse)
Chr.	Chromosome 1 (mouse)
Band	1|1 A2	Start	9,671,424 bp
Band	1|1 A2	End	9,697,368 bp
RNA expression pattern
Bgee	Human / Mouse (ortholog); Top expressed in: C1 segment; Brodmann area 9; prefrontal cortex; cingulate gyrus; anterior cingulate cortex; right frontal lobe; amygdala; caudate nucleus; putamen; hypothalamus / Top expressed in: primary motor cortex; prefrontal cortex; Region I of hippocampus proper; visual cortex; primary visual cortex; superior frontal gyrus; subiculum; cingulate gyrus; hippocampus proper; lumbar subsegment of spinal cord; More reference expression data
BioGPS	n/a
Orthologs
Databases	NCBI: entry; OMA: entry
Species	Human	Mouse
Entrez	254778	76982
Ensembl	ENSG00000169085	ENSMUSG00000067879
UniProt	Q8TAG6	Q8BG31
RefSeq (mRNA)	NM_152765	NM_178399
RefSeq (protein)	NP_689978	NP_848486
Location (UCSC)	Chr 8: 66.49 – 66.52 Mb	Chr 1: 9.67 – 9.7 Mb
PubMed search
- Wikidata
View/Edit Human	View/Edit Mouse

Vexin is a protein encoded by VXN gene. VXN is found to be highly expressed in regions of the brain and spinal cord.

== Gene ==
=== Location ===
VXN is found along the plus strand of chromosome 8. The entire gene is 58,522 bp long. VXN is flanked by alcohol dehydrogenase iron containing 1 and Myb proto-oncogene like 1.

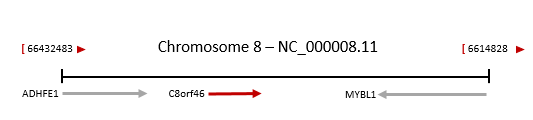
Gene neighborhood of VXN along the forward strand of chromosome 8.

== Homology ==
=== Paralogs ===
No human paralogs for VXN have been identified

=== Orthologs ===
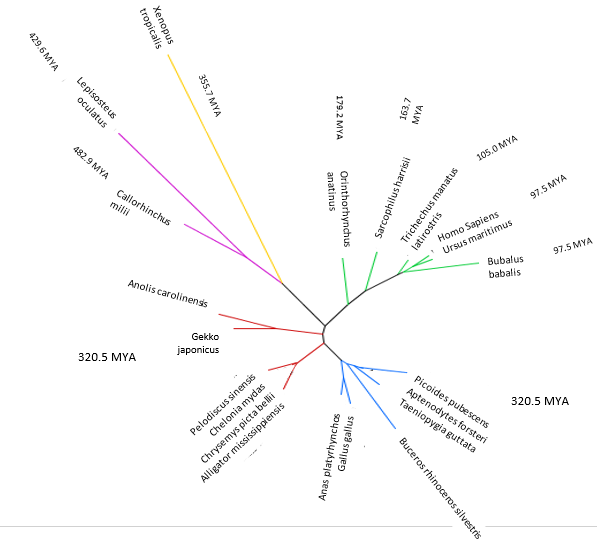
Phylogentic tree of select orthologs of the gene VXN. Estimated date of divergence is shown.

Vexin is found in all classes of vertebrates, including mammals, birds, fish, reptiles and amphibians. The most distant ortholog of VXN is in Callorhinchus milli, which diverged from the human version of the gene an estimated 482.9 million years ago. The gene has not been found in any plants, fungi or single celled organisms.

=== Homologous domains ===
The N-terminus and C-terminus are highly conserved regions across both distant and close orthologs. The orthologs of vexin all show conservation of the SH3 protein domain family as well as a domain of unknown function (DUF4648).

== mRNA ==
=== Splice variants ===
VXN does not have any alternative mRNA splice variants. The mature mRNA is approximately 3,741 base pairs in length and contains six exons.

== Protein ==
=== General properties ===
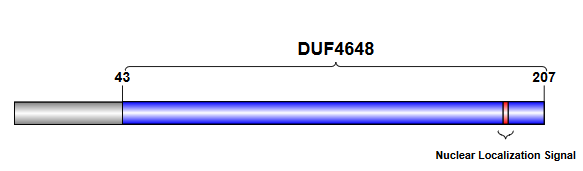
Location of the domain of unknown function and nuclear localization signal along vexin.

Vexin is 207 amino acids long, which equates to a molecular weight of 22.6 kdal. The isoelectric point of the protein is 10.42 which indicates the pH of the protein is basic. Vexin does contain a domain of unknown function (DUF4648) and is a part of the SH3 domain family, which is known to bind to proline-rich ligands. The secondary and tertiary structure of this protein is not well known.

=== Composition ===
Vexin is considered rich in arginine, and poor in phenylalanine compared to the composition of the average human protein. Vexin does contain several regions of positively charged runs and has a high concentration of basic amino acids.

=== Post-translational modifications ===
Vexin is predicted to undergo several types of post translational modifications. With a high degree of certainty, it is predicted that vexin undergoes lysine glycation, O-glycosylation, serine, threonine and tyrosine phosphorylation, SUMOylation and initial methionine acetylation.

Type of Modification	Amino Acid Position	Impact on Protein
Glycation of Epsilon Amino Groups of Lysine	Lys33, Lys41, Lys124, Lys152. Lys153, Lys193	Impairs enzymatic function of protein.
Initial Methionine Acetylation	Met1	Mediates protein stability, sorting and localization.
O-glycosylation sites	Ser25, Ser90, Ser97, Ser102, Ser113, Ser122, Ser126, Ser128 Ser130, Ser148, Ser194, Thr78, Thr101, Thr125, Thr134, Thr155	Regulates transcription and translation factors.
Phosphorylation sites	Ser22, Ser25, Ser26, Ser34, Ser35, Ser97, Ser122, Ser126, Ser130, Ser194, Thr78, Thr83, Thr138, Tyr50, Tyr158, Tyr196	Regulates protein function, cell signaling and enzymatic functions of protein
SUMOylation sites	Lys141, Lys195	Plays a role in nuclear-cytosolic transport, acts as binding site.

=== Subcellular location ===
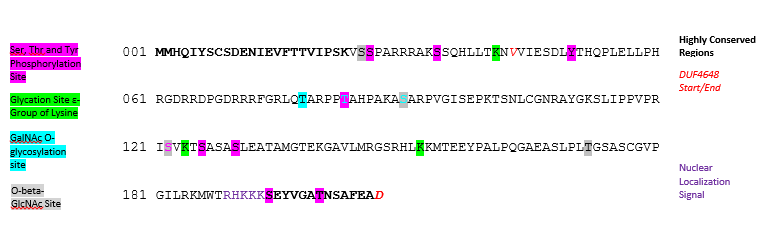
Conceptual translation of VXN depicts predicted post-translational modification sites.

Vexin is predicted to be a nuclear protein, given the classical nuclear localization signal found at amino acids Lys191 to Lys193. Vexin does not contain any transmembrane domains or signal peptides suggesting that it is an intracellular protein.

== Expression ==
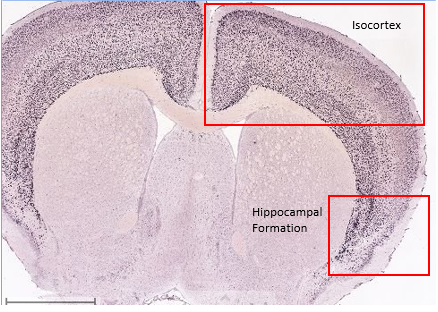
Image from Allen Brain Atlas shows the areas of elevated expression of VXN in the brain.

VXN has shown to be ubiquitously expressed in the body. The gene is expressed in 13 different types of tissue throughout the body, with the brain, spinal cord and nerves showing elevated expression of the gene. Specifically, the isocortex and hippocampal formation areas of the brain show high levels of expression. In addition to healthy tissue, vexin is also found in several disease states. These disease states include chondrosarcoma, glioma, kidney tumors, liver tumors, and germ cell tumors. VXN is only expressed in infants and adults.

== Clinical significance ==
VXN has been associated with breast cancer in humans. The gene has been researched in connection with estrogen receptor 1- enhancer (ESR1), whose expression determines if a breast cancer patient receives endocrine therapy. It is predicted that VXN has ESR1 enhancer regions that become hypermethylated and promote acquired endocrine resistance in breast cancer.
