= ARMH3 =

Protein-coding gene in the species Homo sapiens

Identifiers
- Aliases: ARMH3, chromosome 10 open reading frame 76, C10orf76, armadillo-like helical domain containing 3, armadillo like helical domain containing 3
- External IDs: MGI: 1918867; GeneCards: ARMH3

Gene location (Human)
Chr.	Chromosome 10 (human)
Band	10q24.32	Start	101,845,599 bp
Band	10q24.32	End	102,056,193 bp

Gene location (Mouse)
Chr.	Chromosome 19 (mouse)
Band	19|19 C3	Start	45,805,803 bp
Band	19|19 C3	End	45,986,927 bp
RNA expression pattern
Bgee	Human / Mouse (ortholog); Top expressed in: myocardium of left ventricle; cardiac muscle tissue of right atrium; right auricle of heart; apex of heart; monocyte; granulocyte; gastrocnemius muscle; mucosa of transverse colon; muscle of thigh; gingival epithelium / Top expressed in: interventricular septum; zygote; muscle of thigh; tail of embryo; secondary oocyte; yolk sac; genital tubercle; granulocyte; ventricular zone; lip; More reference expression data
BioGPS	n/a
Orthologs
Databases	NCBI: entry; OMA: entry
Species	Human	Mouse
Entrez	79591	71617
Ensembl	ENSG00000120029	ENSMUSG00000039901
UniProt	Q5T2E6	Q6PD19
RefSeq (mRNA)	NM_024541	NM_198296
RefSeq (protein)	NP_078817	NP_938038
Location (UCSC)	Chr 10: 101.85 – 102.06 Mb	Chr 19: 45.81 – 45.99 Mb
PubMed search
- Wikidata
View/Edit Human	View/Edit Mouse

ARMH3 or Armadillo Like Helical Domain Containing 3, also known as UPF0668 and c10orf76, is a protein that in humans is encoded by the ARMH3 gene. Its function is not currently known, but experimental evidence has suggested that it may be involved in transcriptional regulation. The protein contains a conserved proline-rich motif, suggesting that it may participate in protein-protein interactions via an SH3-binding domain, although no such interactions have been experimentally verified. The well-conserved gene appears to have emerged in Fungi approximately 1.2 billion years ago. The locus is alternatively spliced and predicted to yield five protein variants, three of which contain a protein domain of unknown function, DUF1741.

== Function ==
It has been found to contain a potential SH3-binding domain, which is known to participate in protein-protein binding interactions; however, no protein interactions have been experimentally verified with c10orf76. A 2007 gene expression study found c10orf76 expression to vary inversely with the expression of several other genes, including NFYB, CCR5, and NSBP1, suggesting that the protein may function as a transcriptional regulator.

== Homology ==
ARMH3 is well-conserved throughout Eumetazoans. Some weakly similar orthologs (approximately 35% sequence identity) were identified in Parazoa (i.e., A. queenslandica) and in Fungi, specifically Ascomycetes (i.e., A. oryzae).

The following table illustrates the sequence similarity between human c10orf76 protein and various orthologs. Similar sequences were identified with BLAST and BLAT tools.

Species	Organism common name	NCBI accession	Sequence identity	Sequence similarity	Length (AAs)	Gene common name
Homo sapiens	Human	NP_078817.2	100%	100%	689	UPF0668 protein C10orf76
Mus musculus	House Mouse	NP_938038.2	99%	99%	689	UPF0668 protein C10orf76 homolog
Danio rerio	Zebrafish	NP_956913.2	85%	93%	689	UPF0668 protein C10orf76 homolog
Apis florea	Honey bee	XP_003695991.1	51%	70%	641	Predicted: UPF0668 protein C10orf76 homolog
Amphimedon queenslandica	Sponge	XP_003383350.1	46%	67%	667	Predicted: UPF0668 protein C10orf76-like
Acyrthosiphon pisum	Pea Aphid	XP_001952575.2	40%	61%	684	Predicted: UPF0668 protein C10orf76 homolog isoform 1
Aspergillus oryzae	Fungus	XP_001820240	23%	42%	653	hypothetical protein AOR_1_2042154

== Gene ==
=== Characteristics ===
In humans, the ARMH3 gene, also known by the alias FLJ13114, spans 210,577 base pairs on the reverse strand of the long arm of chromosome 10. Its 26 alternatively spliced exons encode 5 potential transcript variants, the largest of which being 4101 base pairs in length.

A map of human chromosome 10 with c10orf76 marked with the red line.

The human ARMH3 locus is flanked on the left and right sides by HPS6 and KCNIP2, respectively. HPS6 is a protein that may play a role in organelle biogenesis, and KCNIP2 is a voltage-gated potassium channel interacting protein. The same pattern is observed in the orthologous locus in mice, as well as most other vertebrates.

=== Expression ===
The NCBI (GenBank) gene profile for c10orf76 labels the start of the first transcribed exon as the beginning of the gene. The primary promoter predicted by the El Dorado tool from Genomatix begins 519 base pairs upstream of this transcription start site. This promoter is predicted to be 658 base pairs in length and thus includes the first transcribed exon at its 3 prime end.

The c10orf76 locus is thought to be alternatively spliced into at least five unique isoforms, although it is unclear how this splicing is regulated. A second potential promoter, also predicted by El Dorado, likely drives expression of one of the shorter documented variants (positioned before exon 23).

== Protein ==
=== Characteristics ===
The largest protein variant is 689 amino acids in length. It has a molecular mass of approximately 78.7kDa and is isoelectric at pH 6.13. It may be secreted via a non-classical pathway. NCBI identifies a protein domain of unknown function between amino acids Asp435 and Leu671, known as DUF1741 (Domain of Unknown Function 1741). This domain is not known to exist in any other proteins.

=== Expression ===
A potential stem loop region at the 3 prime end of the first exon (and thus, the end of the promoter) was predicted by the Dotlet program from ExPASy. This could serve to regulate protein translation. Also, an Alu segment in the 3 prime untranslated region of the mature mRNA could serve as a potential translational regulatory mechanism.

The protein has been found to be differentially expressed in some medical conditions and in response to certain cellular signals. For example, decreased c10orf76 expression is observed in patients with chronic B-cell lymphocytic leukemia. Decreased expression is also observed in cells treated with vascular endothelial growth factor.

The protein is thought to be localized to the cytoplasm, although this is uncertain. It has also been predicted to be a 3-pass transmembrane protein. Also, a mitochondrial sorting signal was identified at the beginning of one of the protein isoforms using MitoProt II (located at Met416 of the largest protein variant).

=== Structure ===
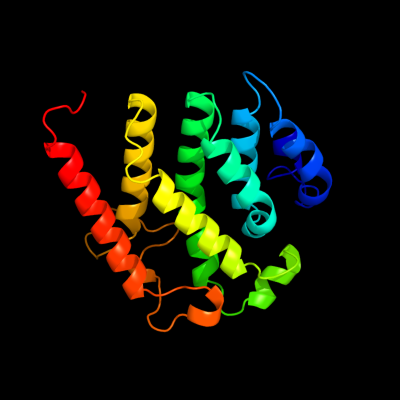
A structural prediction of c10orf76 protein from Phyre2 protein folding software. This structure is similar to that of human Symplekin, a protein thought to recruit regulatory factors to the polyadenylation machinery.

The structure of the c10orf76 protein has not been experimentally explored. The secondary structure is predicted to be completely helical in nature, with intervening regions of protein disorder. The potential SH3-binding domain is located on a predicted region of disorder, further supporting a protein-protein binding function for c10orf76. A helical region between amino acids 610-655 was predicted to be a coiled coil motif.

A Phyre2 protein structure prediction suggested that the first 200 residues of c10orf76 may share strong structural similarities with Symplekin, a nuclear-localized protein that is thought to be a scaffold component of the polyadenylation complex.

=== Predicted protein Interactions ===
The expression of c10orf76 mRNA has been found to be inversely correlated with expression of various other mRNAs, including NFYB, CCR5, and NSBP1. Although this study and the predicted SH3-binding domain suggest that c10orf76 partakes in protein-protein binding interactions, none have been experimentally verified. A short search using IntAct, MINT, and STRING also yielded zero predicted protein-protein interactions.

=== Predicted posttranslational modifications ===
There is a potential that the protein is secreted via a non-classical pathway, which may underlie the functionality of some of the posttranslational modifications. There are ten conserved potential phosphorylation sites within the protein sequence. Also, there are nine residues that are confidently (>90%) predicted by NetOGlyc to undergo O-linked glycosylation, all residing within the low complexity region between Leu325 and Ser359.

=== Regions of potential research interest ===
The protein coded by the largest mRNA variant of c10orf76 encodes a proline-rich motif containing two PxxP domains, where "P" represents a proline residue and "x" represents any other amino acid (highlighted in blue below). These domains have been shown to participate in protein-protein binding interactions, specifically via the SH3 protein binding domain. The potential SH3-binding domain exists within a low complexity region with an unusually high number of amino acids with oxygen-containing side-groups (highlighted in green below). An NetOGlyc analysis of the region suggests that these residues are likely to undergo O-linked glycosylation and thus may serve to regulate binding to the potential SH3-binding domain.

325 L V T T P V S P A P T T P V T P L G T T P P S S 359

An Alu element was identified in the 3`-UTR of the longest mRNA transcript variant It is unclear as to whether this sequence serves any functional or regulatory purpose, but there is existing evidence for Alu-mediated protein translation regulation, so this cannot be ruled out in c10orf76.

The N-terminus of a short transcript variant (exons 17-26) was predicted to have a mitochondrial sorting signal with 96% confidence using the MitoProt II tool. It is unclear as to whether this is a uniquely transcribed variant or it results from protein cleavage of the full-size protein. There are no predicted alternative promoters upstream of this variant's first exon.
