= SH3D21 =

Protein found in humans

Identifiers
- Aliases: SH3D21, C1orf113, SH3 domain containing 21
- External IDs: MGI: 1914188; GeneCards: SH3D21

Gene location (Human)
Chr.	Chromosome 1 (human)
Band	1p34.3	Start	36,306,368 bp
Band	1p34.3	End	36,329,340 bp

Gene location (Mouse)
Chr.	Chromosome 4 (mouse)
Band	4|4 D2.2	Start	126,150,602 bp
Band	4|4 D2.2	End	126,163,491 bp
RNA expression pattern
Bgee	Human / Mouse (ortholog); Top expressed in: right lobe of thyroid gland; left lobe of thyroid gland; skin of leg; skin of abdomen; minor salivary glands; right hemisphere of cerebellum; parotid gland; left ovary; right frontal lobe; right ovary / Top expressed in: seminiferous tubule; spermatid; otolith organ; utricle; hand; left colon; lip; blastocyst; molar; duodenum; More reference expression data
BioGPS	n/a
Orthologs
Databases	NCBI: entry; OMA: entry
Species	Human	Mouse
Entrez	79729	66938
Ensembl	ENSG00000214193	ENSMUSG00000073758
UniProt	A4FU49	Q7TSG5
RefSeq (mRNA)	NM_001162530; NM_024676	NM_001162533; NM_025856
RefSeq (protein)	NP_001156002; NP_078952	NP_001156005; NP_080132
Location (UCSC)	Chr 1: 36.31 – 36.33 Mb	Chr 4: 126.15 – 126.16 Mb
PubMed search
- Wikidata
View/Edit Human	View/Edit Mouse

SH3D21 is a nuclear protein that is encoded by the SH3D21 gene. In humans, this gene is located on chromosome 1 p34.3. The human mRNA transcript is 2527 base pairs and the final protein product is 756 amino acids. While the exact function of this protein remains unknown, due to the presence of three SH3 domains, it has been implicated in protein-protein interactions.

== Gene ==
SH3D21 is expressed in low levels in most tissue. Microarray analysis has shown SH3D21 expression to be decreased in TP63 knockout mice. SH3D21 has been shown to be expressed highly in the superior cervical ganglion, the dorsal root ganglia and the trigeminal ganglion. Transcription of SH3D21 is known to be upregulated in the presence of testosterone.

== Protein ==
SH3D21 contains three SH3 domains. These domains are located near the N-terminus of the protein. In humans, these SH3 domains have a common amino acid sequence Asp-Glu-Leu. This sequence motif is also conserved in other species. SH3D21 has been found to interact with Adenylate Kinase 2, Artemin, and Importin 13. The human protein has two isoforms and no paralogs. The second isoform is 645 amino acids long and is identical to the first isoform, except it is missing the first 111 amino acids. Due to this, the second isoform is missing the first, and half of the second, N-terminal SH3 domain. Secondary structure analysis of SH3D21 indicates a long alpha helical structure near the C-terminus. The purpose of this structure is unknown. SH3D21 is predicted to have many phosphorylation sites and multiple sumoylation sites throughout the entirety of the protein.

This image is a multiple sequence alignment of the three SH3 domains found in the human SH3D21 protein. Note the conserved Asp-Glu-Leu motif. This image was generated using publicly available sequence data and open source software.

== Function ==
The function of this gene is still unclear. However, research has linked SH3D21 expression changes to male infertility and ataxia–telangiectasia. Further studies have implicated the chromosomal region of 1p34.3 in Intracranial Aneurysm and as a negative prognosis sign in colorectal cancer. These studies do not, however, directly mention SH3D21.

== Homology ==
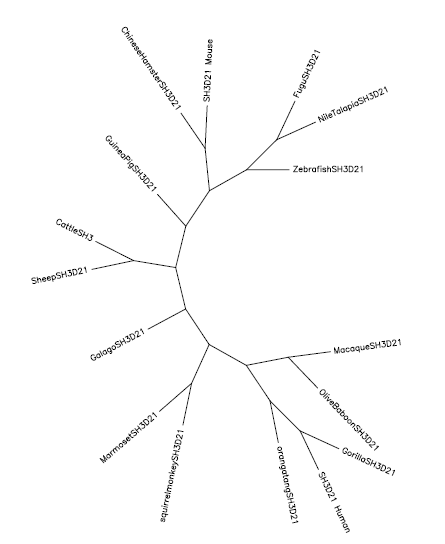
Phylogenetic tree generated using open source, free software and publicly available sequence data

SH3D21 is well-conserved in mammals. BLAST analysis found distant orthologs in Osteichthyes with a max identity of 28%. Sequence identity was calculated using available sequence data and ALIGN software.

Species	Species common name	NCBI Accession Number (Protein)	Length (aa)	Sequence identity
Homo sapiens	Human	NP_001156002	756aa	100%
Gorilla gorilla	Gorilla	XP_004025512	761 aa	97.1%
Pongo abelii	Orangutan	XP_002811093	755aa	94.9%
Macaca mulatta	Macaques	XP_001110607	755aa	91.4%
Papia anubir	Olive Baboon	XP_003891645/	761aa	91.2%
Saimiri boliviensis	Black Capped Squirrel Monkey	XP_003308029	650aa	82.0%
Bos taurus	Cattle	NP_001156006	676aa	58.70%
Cavia porcellus	Guinea pig	XP_003471528	658aa	52.60%
Oreochromis niloticus	Nile Talapia	XP_003450596	505aa	28.1%
