= MAIA =

MAIA may refer to:

- Japan Marine Accident Inquiry Agency
- Multi-Angle Imager for Aerosols (MAIA), a NASA spacecraft mission
- Islamic Armed Movement, an Islamic guerrilla group and terrorist organization in northern Algeria in the 1980s and 90s
