= Mya =

Mya or MYA may refer to:

== Brands and product names ==
- Mya (TV channel), an Italian Television channel
- Mya (program), an intelligent personal assistant created by Motorola
- Midwest Young Artists, a comprehensive youth music program

== Codes ==
- Burmese language (ISO 639-3: mya)
- Moruya Airport (IATA code: MYA), New South Wales, Australia
- The IOC, license plate, and UNDP country code for Myanmar

== People ==
- Mya (given name)
- Mya (singer) (Mya Marie Harrison, born 1979), American R&B singer-songwriter and actress
- Bo Mya (1927–2006), Myanmar rebel leader and chief commander of the Karen National Union

== Other uses ==
- Mýa (album), a 1998 album by Mýa
- Mya (bivalve), a genus of soft-shell clams
- Million years ago (Mya or mya), a dating convention used in astronomy, biology and, sometimes, geology

== See also ==
- A (motor yacht) (M/Y A), a superyacht
- Maia (disambiguation)
- Maya (disambiguation)
- Mia (disambiguation)
- Myia (fl. 500 BC), Pythagorean philosopher
