= Maiya =

The Mahiya or Maiya are a landowning community found in the state of Gujarat in India.

== See also ==
- Kota Brahmins
- Mers
- Kathi
- Manka
- Thakore
