= Saarwellingen =

- Municipality
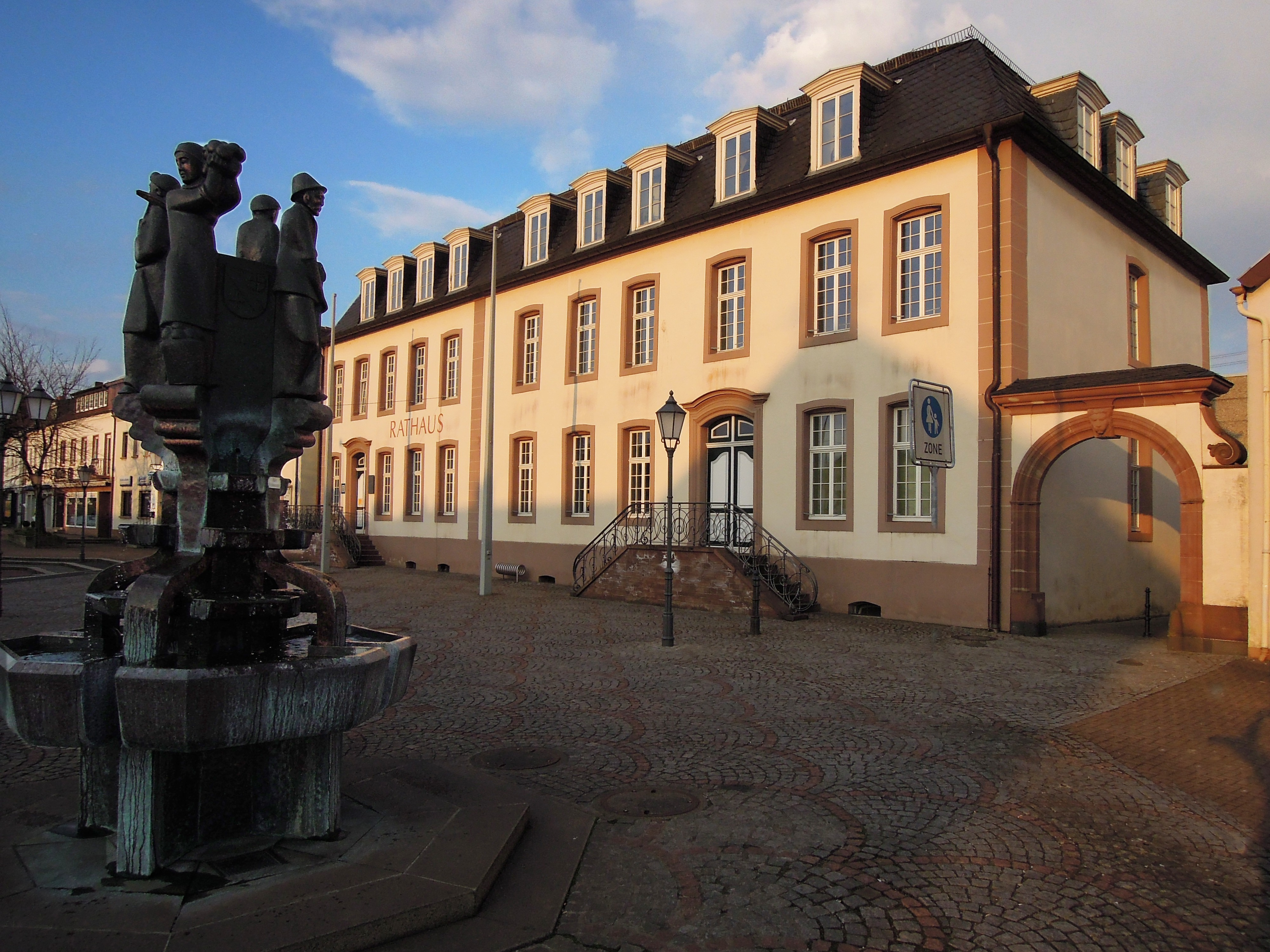
- Saarwellingen Palace, serving as a Town Hall

- Coat of arms

- Location of Saarwellingen within Saarlouis district
- Interactive map of Saarwellingen
- Location within Germany Location within Saarland
- Coordinates: 49°21′N 6°50′E
- Country: Germany
- State: Saarland
- District: Saarlouis
- Subdivisions: 3

Government
  - Mayor (2024–34): Horst Brünnet (FW)

Area
  - Total: 41.67 km^{2} (16.09 sq mi)
- Elevation: 187–332 m (614–1,089 ft)

Population (2025-12-31)
  - Total: 13,590
  - Density: 326.1/km^{2} (844.7/sq mi)
- Time zone: UTC+01:00 (CET)
  - Summer (DST): UTC+02:00 (CEST)
- Postal codes: 66788–66793
- Dialling codes: 06838
- Vehicle registration: SLS
- Website: www.saarwellingen.de

Saarwellingen (German pronunciation: [ˌzaːɐ̯ˈvɛlɪŋən]; French: Sarrevailingue [saʁvɛlɛ̃ɡ]) is a municipality in the district of Saarlouis in Saarland, Germany. As of 2022 it has a population of 13,302.

== Notable people ==
- Maya Leinenbach, German social media personality, businesswoman and cookbook author (born 2004)
