= Riddles (surname) =

Riddles is a surname. Notable people with the surname include:

- Libby Riddles (born 1956), American dog musher
- Nat Riddles (1952–1991), blues harmonica player
- Robert Riddles (1892–1983), British locomotive engineer

== See also ==
- Riddle (surname)
- Riddle (disambiguation)
