= Maya Leinenbach =

German influencer and author (born 2004)

- Born: 2004 (age 22); Saarwellingen, Saarland, Germany
- Occupations: Social media personality Businesswoman; Cookbook writer
- Years active: 2019–present
- Known for: Recipes on social media

Maya Leinenbach (born 2004) is a German social media personality, businesswoman and cookbook author. Originally from Saarwellingen, Saarland, Leinenbach became vegan in January 2019 and began posting vegan recipes on her Instagram account, "FitGreenMind", that same month. Despite being German, Leinenbach primarily speaks English in her videos in order to communicate with more people internationally. In 2020, her account gained more popularity when she began using Instagram reels, and one of her first reels went viral. In 2021, she published her first cookbook, with a second one being released in 2025. After graduating from high school in 2023, she moved to Stuttgart to focus on her career full-time, and co-founded the limited company "FitGreenMind".

== Early and personal life ==
Maya Leinenbach was born in 2004 in Saarwellingen, Saarland. She had an interest in cooking from a young age, and her parents often cooked from scratch. Leinenbach's sister was vegetarian, which Leinenbach initially struggled to understand due to her love of meat. However, Leinenbach became vegan one day in early 2019 after she completed a school project regarding the influence of nutrition and consumption on the environment. When she became vegan, she started cooking from scratch more often. She initially struggled with being vegan in rural Saarland due to its lack of vegan restaurants and of a plant-based eating culture, so she began creating her own recipes, partly inspired by the cooking style of Jamie Oliver. One of her majors in high school was physical education. In addition to cooking, she enjoys sports, nature and mountain hiking.

== Career ==
Leinenbach is a food content creator and influencer. She launched her Instagram account, Fitgreenmind, in January 2019 when she was 14-years-old. She created her account because she wanted to publish a cookbook, which was an idea she had with her mother, but believed no one would purchase it because she was unknown. She noted that the people around her were open-minded but she had occasional rude comments on her videos and that some people found it strange, though this did not deter her. She initially shared pictures and videos of vegan recipes, and one of her first Instagram Reels, which was a recipe for cauliflower Alfredo sauce, went viral with 1 million views. She is known for publishing vlogs and recipes around plant-based eating. By October 2020, she felt frustrated as she was not making progress despite working a lot to improve her videos, but this changed when she began posting reels instead, shortly after Instagram introduced them. Her followers went from 70,000 to 200,000 within two months. She initially did not speak or show herself in her videos, but began doing so when she switched to reels.

Leinenbach continued studying at school whilst posting her videos, and she was sometimes recognised by people in the school; some of her teachers also knew that she posted videos. Regarding her work routine, she explained in a 2022 interview that she filmed her videos on Saturdays, edited them on Sundays for four or five hours and wrote the captions and recipes after school on weekdays, in addition to answering messages during breaks. She added that she tested her recipes by cooking them for her family, who gave her feedback. She takes inspiration from things such as restaurants, social media platforms and her grandmother's cookbook, in addition to wanting to "veganize" non-vegan recipes and food. She wanted to create recipes that could be made with "what you have in your fridge at home" as she felt frustrated that many recipes included ingredients that she could not find her in her village. Leinenbach speaks English in her videos in order to reach a wider audience, as well as to practise her English. Early on in her career, she sold two ebooks of recipes on Elopage.

"I think it's great and fascinating that you can really have an impact and inspire others to cook something vegan more often, even if they've never tried it before."

— Leinenbach in 2024

By 2021, she had a million followers on Instagram. That same year, she published her first cookbook, titled Oh, that's vegan? Make it Maya: 50 ways to surprise your friends and family with vegan food, published on 7 October of that year. She did not release it on Amazon as she believed that the company was not very sustainable, which was important to her. In 2022, after the Russian invasion of Ukraine, Leinenbach posted a reel of her cooking pierogi, saying that she chose them as they "exist actually in every culture with small variations". That same year, she reached 2 million followers on Instagram.

In 2023, she completed her Abitur, the German high school qualification. She explained that when she was in high school, she did not consider going to university as she knew that she could pursue her food blog full-time when she graduated, although she noted in a 2024 interview that she would consider studying a degree related to the human body. That same year, Falstaff called her "Germany's most successful vegan food creator". That same year, she moved to Stuttgart and focused full-time on her social media channels, working with her manager and her marketing consultant, who she has worked with since 2020. In March 2024, they founded a limited company, Fitgreenmind, which intends to provide access to vegan products and encourage people to eat sustainably. She is responsible for creating the content whilst her two business partners manage the company and handle finances. That same year, she toured Germany with a live cooking show. Leinenbach has also won awards and collaborated with other chefs. She has said that she learned more about business matters by developing FitGreenMind and wants to develop more offline and online products, such as long-form YouTube videos and pop-up restaurants.

In 2024, the majority of Leinenbach's viewers were women between the ages of 25 and 34, with many viewers in Germany and English-speaking countries such as the UK, the US and Canada. That same year, Forbes gave her an entrepreneurship score of 3. Leinenbach released her second cookbook, Plantiful Cooking, in 2025. That same year, she visited London and reviewed her favourite restaurants to eat as a vegan.

== Bibliography ==
- Oh, that's vegan? Make it Maya: 50 ways to surprise your friends and family with vegan food (2021)
- Plantiful Cooking (2025)
