= Maja (peak) =

Mountain peak in Kosovo

Coordinates: 42.053333°N 20.758333°E

Maja is a mountain peak found in Kosovo.
