= Maya Trotz =

- Born: 25 February 1973 (age 53); Kitty, Georgetown, Guyana
- Education: BSc in Chemical Engineering MSc and PhD degrees in Civil and Environmental Engineering
- Alma mater: Massachusetts Institute of Technology (MIT) and Stanford University
- Occupation: Environmental Engineer

Maya Trotz (born 25 February 1973) is a Guyanese environmental engineer and academic at the University of South Florida.

== Early life ==
Maya Trotz was born to Ulric and Marilyne Trotz on 25 February 1973 in Kitty, Georgetown in Guyana. Her father Ulric was a chemist and involved in the establishment of the Institute of Applied Science and Technology in Guyana. Her mother died in 2021 from Covid-19, after which she urged officials to take further precautions to improve the response to Covid-19 in the Caribbean.

== Education ==
Trotz's primary education was at St Margaret's Primary and she then went on the Queen's College. Whilst Trotz had an interest in the arts she decided to pursue the sciences.

Trotz majored in Chemical Engineering at the Massachusetts Institute of Technology (MIT) with a minor in Theatre. It was during this time that she discovered Environmental Engineering leading to her post-graduate study of the subject at Stanford University.

== Career ==
On completion of her doctoral research, Trotz joined the University of South Florida as an assistant professor in 2004. She is now a Professor in Civil and Environmental Engineering at the University of South Florida. Trotz has undertaken research with organisations such as the World Wide Fund for Nature, the Inter-American Development Bank and Guyana Water Incorporated. Trotz's research centres around environmental engineering and education as a tool for sustainable development and widening participation. She has participated in research focused on the Americas and the Caribbean in particular.

In 2013 Trotz was one of the founders for the Caribbean Science Foundation, originally starting in Barbados, the foundation is now active in twelve Caribbean countries. She was also on the governing council of the foundation. During this time she was also part of the Sagicor Visionaries Challenge, named in recognition of the financial contribution to the foundation from Sagicor. Trotz is also a board member for Fragments of Hope Corp, a non-governmental organisation which is dedicated to scalable solutions for coral reef restoration in Belize.

In 2018, Trotz became the president of the Association of Environmental Engineering and Science Professors (AEESP), becoming the first African American woman to do so.

== Awards ==
In 2014 Trotz received the AEESP Award for Outstanding Contribution to Environmental Engineering and Science Education. In 2021 Trotz received the Steven K. Dentel AEESP Award for Global Outreach due to her "extensive" and "sustained portfolio of accomplishments".
