= Maya Alhawary =

Emirati educator

- Born: 10 July 1979 (age 47); United Arab Emirates
- Occupation: Chairwoman of Board of Governors of Dubai Carmel School- Director of Planning

Maya Alhawary (born 10 July 1979), is an Emirati educator. She serves as Chairwoman of Board of Governors of Dubai Carmel School - Director of Planning from the United Arab Emirates. She was chosen as the “Ambassador of Knowledge” at the UAE Red Crescent, and in 2019 was selected among 50 influential accounts in social media. She works on developing the personal skills of employees of various government agencies in the United Arab Emirates.

== Career ==
Alhawary started her career in 2012, when she was appointed as Principal and Acting Director of Dubai Women's College High School becoming the first ever Emirati woman to become a principal for the first learning environment school in the MENA Region. She was named Knowledge Ambassador to the UAE Red Crescent in 2017 where she was a volunteer lecturer. Alhawary later became Chairwoman of Board of Governors of Dubai Carmel School in 2014. She was a speaker on the TEDx platform in 2019.

Alhawary was invited to speak at the National Treasure Conference in 2018. Alhawary was one of the four panelists at "The Flow Talk Series" session held on the occasion of Emirati Women's Day and one of the panelists, as celebrated on 28 August 2019.
