= Maya & Nancy Yamout =

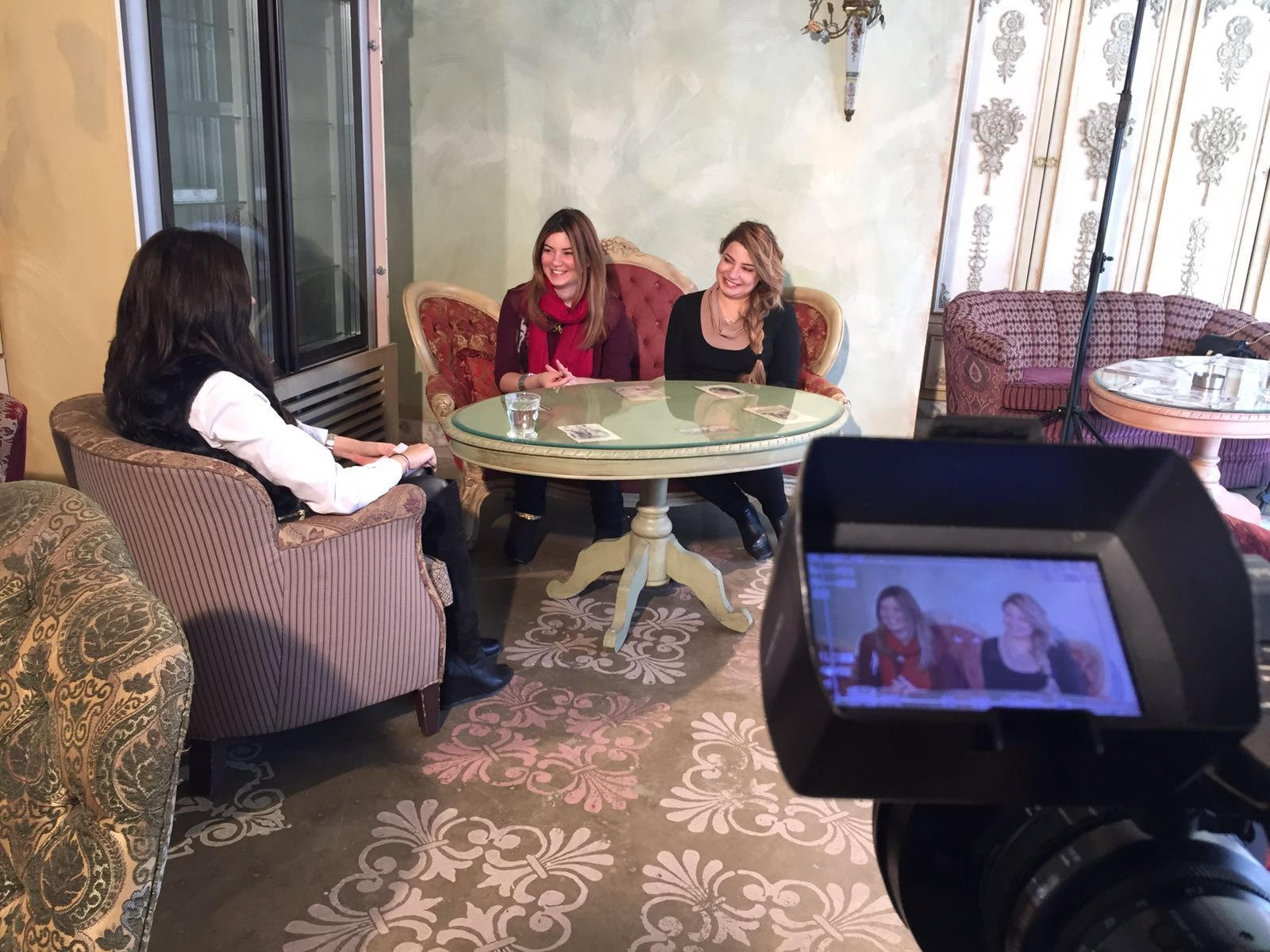
Sisters Maya and Nancy Yamout being interviewed about their research in Beirut, Lebanon

Nancy and Maya Yamout, also known as the "Mulan Sisters" or the "Kamikaze Sisters," are social workers active in Beirut, Lebanon and internationally as the president and vice president of Rescue Me - Crime Prevention.

== Rescue Me ==
Rescue Me is a rehabilitation program for accused Islamist terrorists in Roumieh Prison. The program is based on research the sisters performed during their master's degree studies. After submitting their thesis titled "The Role of Forensic Social Work in Terrorism and Knowing its Reasons and Effects on Society," the sisters created a system whereby they visit prisons holding accused terrorists to psychologically survey and rehabilitate them.
