= Maya Inchikyan =

Armenian and Soviet organic chemist (1930–2013)

Maya Grantovna Inchikyan (1 May 1930 – 13 December 2013) was an Armenian and Soviet organic chemist. Doctor of Chemical Sciences (1966), Professor (1974), Academician of the Armenian National Academy of Sciences (1996).

== Biography ==
In 1953, Inchikyan graduated from the Faculty of Chemistry of Moscow State University. The same year she started to work at the Institute of Organic Chemistry of the Academy of Sciences of the Armenian SSR. Inchikyan became a Doctor of Chemical Sciences in 1966 and a Professor in 1974.

Since 1970, Inchikyan has been the Head of the Laboratory of Organoelement Compounds at the Institute of Organic Chemistry of the National Academy of Sciences of the Republic of Armenia. Since 1971, she was a lecturer at Yerevan State University.

Her scientific works are related to the study of alkalization reactions in an aqueous medium with quaternary ammonium salts. In this area, Inchikyan together with Araksi Babayan discovered a new interaction in ammonium salts called the "rearrangement-cleavage" reaction in 1961. As a result of this interaction, inaccessible unsaturated ketones, acids, esters, enamines, and other substances were formed.

She studied the isomerism of quaternary phosphonium salts containing an unsaturated group, the primary hydrolysis, and thermal fission reactions. She obtained a new type of phosphobetins, synthesized several active plant protection products, and studied carbon-element bond reactions (nitrogen, sulfur, oxygen, halogen).

== Patents ==
Among her patents are:

- Method for producing dialkylaminodi(alkyl)boranes,
- Method for producing mixed formals,
- Method for producing triphenyl or tributylbutadien-1,3-ylphosphonium salts,
- Method for producing 1,3-butadienyldiethylphosphonates,
- Method for producing diphenylalken-2-ylphosphines.

== Awards and honors ==
In 2003, Inchikyan was awarded the state award of Armenia Order of Honor Armenia and a medal of Anania Shirakatsi for outstanding activity, significant inventions, and discoveries in the field of science. She was also awarded the title Merited scientist of the Armenian Republic in 2012.
