= Maya Pellegrini =

Chilean footballer (born 2002)

Personal information
- Date of birth: 14 November 2002 (age 23)
- Place of birth: Littleton, Colorado, U.S.
- Position: Forward

Team information
- Current team: Molfetta (futsal)

Youth career
- 2016–2018: Colorado Rush
- 2018–2020: Colorado Rapids
- 2019–2021: Colorado Academy

College career
| Years | Team | Apps | (Gls) |
| 2021 | Portland Pilots | | |
| 2022–2023 | Western Carolina Catamounts | | |

Senior career*
| Years | Team | Apps | (Gls) |
| 2023 | Universidad Católica | | |
| 2024 | Santiago Morning | | |
| 2025– | Molfetta (futsal) | | |

International career^{‡}
| 2018 | Chile U20 | | |
- * Club domestic league appearances and goals ‡ National team caps and goals as of 20 February 2024

Maya Pellegrini (born 14 November 2002) is a footballer and futsal player who plays as a forward for Femminile Molfetta in the Italian Serie A (futsal). Born in the United States, she represents Chile internationally.

== Club career ==
Born in Littleton, Colorado, United States, as a youth player, Pellegrini was with both Colorado Rush and Colorado Rapids as well as with the Colorado Academy's soccer team from 2019 to 2021.

At college level, she played for Portland Pilots in 2021 and Western Carolina Catamounts in 2022–23 in the NCAA Division I.

In August 2023, she moved to Chile and signed with the Universidad Católica women's team in the top division. The next season, she switched to Santiago Morning.

In 2025, Pellegrini moved to Italy and signed with Femminile Molfetta in the Serie A (futsal).

== International career ==
In 2018, she was part of the Chile national under-20 team.

After a training microcycle with the Chile senior team in June 2023, she received her first call-up, being a substitute player in the 4–0 loss against Brazil on 2 July.

== Personal life ==
Born in the United States, her parents are Ivonne and Gino Pellegrini, both Chileans.

She got a bachelor's degree in mechanical engineering at University of Portland.
