= Maja (given name) =

Maja (Cyrillic: Маја) is a Slavic and German feminine given name.

== Etymology ==
It can be a short form of Marija, Maria, Mary or Magdalena in Europe (specifically, in the following countries: Germany, Scandinavian countries, Slovenia, Croatia, Serbia, North Macedonia). It can also be a spelling variation of Maya.

== Notable persons with the name ==
- Maja Aleksić (born 1997), Serbian volleyball player
- Maja Alm (born 1988), Danish athlete
- Maja Apostoloska (born 1976), Macedonian writer
- Maja Åström
- Maja Berezowska, Polish painter
- Maja Blagdan (born 1968), Croatian singer
- Maja Bogdanović, Serbian-French cellist
- Maja Chwalińska (born 2001), Polish tennis player
- Maja Cvjetković (born 1985), Croatian model
- Maja Dunfjeld (born 1947), researcher and duodji craftswoman
- Maja Einstein (1881–1951), sister of Albert Einstein
- Maja Forsslund (1878–1967), Swedish folklorist and women's rights activist
- Maja Gojković (born 1963), Serbian politician
- Maja Grønbæk (born 1971), Danish handball player
- Maja Hill (born 1976), Macedonian artist
- Maja Hoffmann (born 1956), Swiss art collector and businesswoman
- Maja Hug (1928–2023), Swiss figure skater
- Maja Ivarsson (born 1979), Swedish singer
- Maja Kersnik (born 1981), Slovenian badminton player
- Maja Keuc (born 1992), Slovenian singer
- Maja Komorowska (born 1937), Polish actress
- Maja Krantz
- Maja Latinović (born 1980), Serbian model
- Maja Lidia Kossakowska (1972–2022), Polish writer
- Maja Lunde (born 1975), Norwegian writer
- Maja Lundgren
- Maja Marijana (born 1972), Serbian singer
- Maja Matevžič (born 1980), Slovenian tennis player
- Maja Nylén Persson (born 2000), Swedish ice hockey player
- Maja Ognjenović (born 1984), Serbian volleyball player
- Maja Ostaszewska (born 1972), Polish actress
- Maja Petrić
- Maja Poljak (born 1983), Croatian volleyball player
- Maja Ratkje (born 1973), Norwegian musician
- Maja Refsum (1897–1986), Norwegian sculptor
- Maja Salvador (born 1988), Filipino actress
- Maja Savić (born 1976), Montenegrin handball player
- Maja Savić (volleyball) (born 1993), Serbian volleyball player
- Maja Simanić (born 1980), Serbian volleyball player
- Maja Sokač (born 1982), Croatian handball player
- Maja Somodi (born 2004), Hungarian short-track speed skater
- Maja Stark (born 1999), Swedish golfer
- Maja Tatić (born 1970), Serbian singer
- Maja Trochimczyk (born 1957), Polish-American writer
- Maja Vojnović (born 1998), Slovenian handball player
- Maja Włoszczowska (born 1983), Polish mountain biker
- Rika Maja, Sámi noaidi (d. 1757)

== Fictional characters ==
- Maja, a character first appeared in the episode "Sky Witch" of the animated series Adventure Time

== See also ==
- Maja (disambiguation)
