= Aitana López =

AI-generated virtual influencer

- Occupation: virtual influencer

Instagram information
- Page: fit_aitana
- Followers: 391,000

TikTok information
- Page: fitaitana
- Followers: 4,826

X information
- Handle: @Fitness_Aitana
- Followers: 10,809

YouTube information
- Channel: fit_aitana_official
- Subscribers: 762
- Last updated: 2026-05-11
- Website: www.theclueless.ai/project/aitana-lopez

Aitana López is a hyper-realistic, AI-generated virtual influencer presented as a 26-year-old Scorpio from Barcelona, Spain. She was created by The Clueless, a creative agency founded by designer Rubén Cruz. López is portrayed as a bold and fearless content creator whose digital persona combines gaming, fitness, and fashion, presenting a lifestyle framed as aspirational and authentic.

== Origins and creation ==
According to Cruz, the project originated after the agency reviewed its internal processes and identified recurring disruptions in client campaigns caused by factors outside its control, frequently related to external influencers or models rather than design execution. To mitigate these issues, the agency developed its own virtual influencer to function as a fully controlled and consistently available model for brand collaborations.

López reportedly earns thousands of euros per month through subscriptions on Fanvue and through brand partnerships, with all aspects of her activity managed by a dedicated team. Media and brand assets associated with the character have been estimated to generate between US$800,000 and US$1 million in revenue. The project has also been linked to the launch of a skincare-themed brand, Vellum, described as an AI upscaling tool designed to enhance the realism of other AI-generated avatars. López has been described as appealing to brands due to the perceived authenticity and reliability of her character.

== Social media usage ==
López is an AI influencer active across multiple social media platforms, most notably Instagram, where she has more than 370,000 followers. She also maintains a presence on YouTube and TikTok. Her accounts have been noted for a blunt communication style and frequent direct engagement with followers, which has been cited as contributing to closer interaction with followers compared with other AI-generated personalities.

She shares sponsored content across fashion, lifestyle, fitness, and gaming, reportedly earning thousands of euros monthly through such collaborations. López has worked with brands internationally and has been associated with collaborations involving companies such as Amazon, Razer, and Magnific. She is also noted for her visibility within the AI and virtual influencer community.

== See also ==
- Miquela
- Virtual influencer
