= Maya Sumbadze =

Maya Sumbadze (February 29, 1972 -) is a famous Georgian artist based in Tbilisi, Georgia. She has been an active artist since 17 years old. Her works include paintings, graphic design, fashion, multimedia, and even musical vocals. She has been exhibited in cities such as Paris, Berlin, Washington D.C., Amsterdam, Vienna, Prague, Istanbul, and Tbilisi.

== Early life and education ==
Born into a family of architects, design was prevalent in Maya's life from the start to the extent that she never even thought about going in any other direction besides art. At age 15, she submitted to the Niko Nikoladze College and later the Tbilisi State Academy of the Arts. In the 1990s she lived in the Netherlands for a year and studied at the Gerrit Rietveld Academy.

== Style ==
Maya does not consider herself to have one style or one direction within the sphere of art as she claims "it all interests her". She works in graphic design as well as paintings and often received requests and order for the production of each. She has worked on projects ranging from wallpaper design for interiors, to book design, illustrations for magazines, cards, posters, calendars, bank cards and more. When her son introduced her to a digitiser, she began conducting experiments, making prints at home on different kinds of papers and colourful digital versions.

== Notable exhibits and works ==
"Legal" Exhibit, Tbilisi, Georgia, 1993.

"4 Stuck"Exhibit, State Gallery of Karvasla, Tbilisi, Georgia, 1994.

Performing songs in soundtrack for Nika Machaidze's short film "Fly Alone", music by Gogi Dzodzuashvili, 1995. Performing vocals in Gogi Dzodzuashvili's album "Mjava Message", 1996.

International Avant-Garde Fashion Assemble. Fashion Show. Award: Grand Prize, 1997.

Fashion Show at the International Festival Line, Batumi, Georgia, 1999.

Video Projection for Nika Machaidze's Live Performance in Sofia, Bulgaria, 1999.

Group Exhibit "Goslab Presents" - Orient Gallery, Tbilisi; Audio-Visual Production, 2000.

Group Exhibit "Goslab Presents" - Exit Festival, Paris, 2002.

Group Exhibit "Arteria", Tbilisi History Museum, 2002.

Group Exhibit "Tbilisi 2", Tbilisi, 2004.

Group Exhibit "Tbilisi 3", Tbilisi, 2006.

Group Exhibit "Atmosphere 41 Degree", Istanbul, 2007. Group Exhibit "Past, Present and Future", Washington D.C., 2007.

Solo Exhibit "Fast Forward", Tbilisi, 2009.

Group Exhibit "On the Way", Tbilisi, 2011.

Group Exhibit "East Mission Georgian Female Artists Films", Berlin, 2012.

Group Exhibit "Tamada Tutorial" at Meet Factory, Prague, 2012.

"Take me out" Exhibit, 2013.

"On the Way" Exhibit, 2013.

Vienna Art Fair, 2014

Istanbul Art Fair, 2015.

== Goslab ==
For a period of time from 1990 to 2000, Maya was a member of the artistic collective Goslab, which was a group that made exhibits together. Goals was a "group of friends, who wanted to play creative games and hang out the best they could in the given circumstances". It was created not long after the civil war in Georgia, which was followed by another war in Abkhazia, during a period when the country was crippled, in a time of fear, confusion, anguish, despair, and isolation. But nevertheless, there was a huge desire and eagerness to create a magical platform, where imagination could thrive and distract.

== Family and leisure ==
Maya has four kids. Her leisure interests include swimming and the beach as she loves the sea, especially the Black Sea.
