= Riddle, West Virginia =

Riddle
- Unincorporated community
- Location within the state of West Virginia Riddle (the United States)
- Coordinates: 39°11′43″N 80°58′46″W
- Country: United States
- State: West Virginia
- County: Ritchie
- Elevation: 1,181 ft (360 m)
- Time zone: UTC-5 (Eastern (EST))
  - Summer (DST): UTC-4 (EDT)
- GNIS ID: 1689046

Riddle is an unincorporated community in Ritchie County, West Virginia, United States.
