= Mya Rose =

- Birth name: Mya Rose Wilkins
- Born: 4 September 1979 (age 45)
- Genres: Folk alternative, folk rock
- Occupation(s): Singer-songwriter, record producer, guitarist, sailor
- Years active: 1995–present
- Labels: 1995–present Indie,
- Website: http://myarose.withthecurrent.net/

Mya Rose Gill (stage name Mya Rose, formerly Mya Rose Wilkins) is an indie folk-alternative artist, born 4 September 1979. She has spent the last 13 years gigging around the world from huge stages to street corners, from Korea to England, California to North Carolina. Her music is described as 'soulful vocals backed by rockin' folk with a hint of country'.

== Musical career ==
At 18 she co-created the indie rock group Slappin Patties and was the band's lead vocalist, songwriter and acoustic guitarist. While Mya was with Slappin Patties they released the album 'Take Me Home'. After the group disbanded in 2002 Mya played solo until creating a new band: Mya Rose & the Flux band. After breaking away from the Flux band in 2006 Mya continued her solo act. Also in 2006, Mya Rose wrote, recorded, & produced her first solo album: 'breaking free.' Half of this CD was recorded on her 30' O'day sloop, "Risky Business". In 2008 she completed her second solo album 'Sailin' South' aboard her boat studio "Burnett Trilogy", a 30' Pearson sloop in the harbor of Ocracoke, North Carolina while living out on the hook in the O'day.

== Major performances ==
Beaufort Music Festival, Ocrafolk Festival, Hoke County Ho Down, WOVV fundraiser concert, Fort Bragg Fair (with Slappin' Patties), 99.1 'the sound' Acoustic Lunch, Creator and host of Mango Loco and Dirty Dick's Open Mic Nights

== Critical acclaim ==
Mya Rose's music is generally well liked by most critics. Marlene Palumbo from Indienink Music described Mya's solo debut album as "Her accomplished deep sultry vocals adeptly wrap around the lyrics, to pull you right in... This is one that will be in my player many times...". Darryl Gregory from Indie-Music.com described the same album as "...The voice is great, the songs are good. I look forward to hearing the next one." Other notable positive reviews came from Rob Lucey at Carolina Currents Magazine who said "...she found a niche in the island's music scene playing her folk rock with a country tinge..." and Jamie Tunnell of the Ocracoke Observer who said "The Mya Rose Band has soulful vocals backed by rockin' folk with bluesy harmonica and vibrant sax. She sings and plays guitar from deep within her soul..."
