= Manka (caste) =

Community in India

The Manka are a community found in the state of Gujarat in India. There are Hindu and Muslim Mankas.

== History and origin ==
The Manka are said to get their name from their profession of making manka, which in the Gujarati language means the making of prayer beads. They claim to be Chavda Rajputs. The community is said to have come from Sindh in modern-day Pakistan and are now found mainly in 20 villages of Bachau and Rapar talukas of Kutch District in the Indian state of Gujrat. Some of the Manka are found in Jam Salaya district Jamnagar in Saurashtra who are mainly into fishing and seafaring work.

== Present circumstances ==
The Manka speak a dialect of Kutchi, with substantial Sindhi loan words. The Manka consist of a number of clans, the main ones being the Jabayi, Chunctria, Jesra, Payana, Chavda, Sinayi etc. The community is split along religious lines, with the Bhuj Manka being Muslim. They resemble other Kutch Muslim communities in social, ritual and religious activity. The Manka are an endogamous community, and marriages between the clans is the norm. Land is a major economic source, and agriculture is their traditional occupation.

== See also ==
- Kathi
