= Mia (surname) =

Mia is a surname of multiple origins. Notable people with the surname include:

- Abdul Awal Mia (?–2014), Bangladeshi politician
- Abdul Aziz Mia (born 1951/1952), Bangladeshi politician
- Abdul Latif Mia (?–2021), Bangladeshi politician
- Abida Mia, Malawian politician
- Abdur-Rehman Ismael Mia, real name of Ray Mia, British film-, audio-, and theatre producer
- Abul Hossain Mia, Bangladeshi politician
- Abu Taleb Mia (1936–2007), Bangladeshi politician
- Adur Rouf Mia, Bangladeshi politician
- Akhtaruzzaman Mia (born 1957), Bangladeshi politician and businessman
- Akhter Mia (1920–1984), Bangladeshi politician
- Ali Hossain Mia (born 1936/1937), Bangladeshi politician
- Aminul Islam Danesh Mia (1919–2006), Bangladeshi politician
- Arman Mia (born 1977), Bangladeshi professional footballer
- Asaduzzaman Mia (born 1960), Bangladeshi police officer
- Delwar Hossain Mia, Bangladeshi police officer
- Habibur Rahman Mia, Bangladeshi politician
- Katja Mia (born 1996), Irish model, social media influencer, and television presenter
- Kaus Mia (1931–2024), Bangladeshi tycoon
- Khaju Mia, Bangladeshi politician
- Md. Abul Kashem Mia, Bangladeshi academic and computer scientist
- Md. Abdul Matin Mia, Bangladeshi politician
- Pia Mia (born 1996), Guamanian singer, actress, and author
- Rahmat Mia (born 1999), Bangladeshi professional footballer
- Raushanul Haque Moti Mia, Bangladeshi politician
- Rubel Mia (born 1992), Bangladeshi cricketer
- Sardoine Mia (born 1998), Congolese visual artist
- Sidik Mia (1965–2021), Malawian businessman and politician

== See also ==
- Mia (given name)
