= Maya Parbhoe =

Surinamese politician (born 1988)

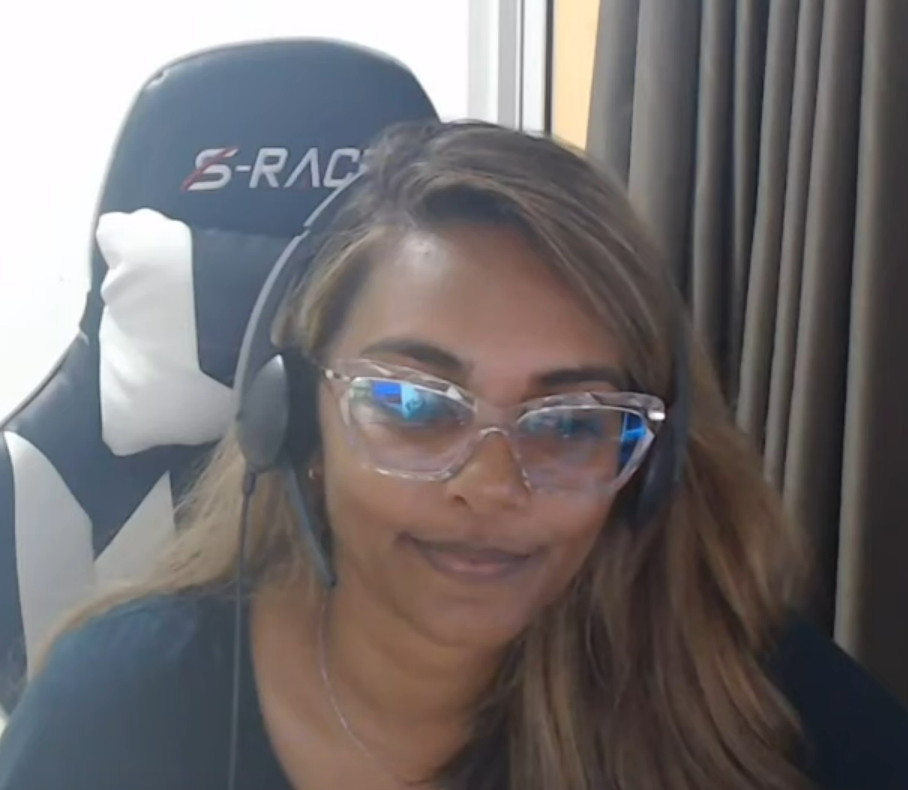
- Parbhoe in 2024

Personal details
- Born: November 25, 1988 (age 37) Paramaribo, Suriname
- Party: NPS
- Education: Erasmus Universiteit Rotterdam, Hogeschool Inholland, Florida International University
- Website: maya2025.com

Maya Parbhoe (born 1988) is a Surinamese businesswoman and politician who has been a candidate for the 2025 presidential elections of Suriname. Since December 2024 she is a member of the National Party of Suriname. She is CEO of Daedalus Labs and board member of Icarus Geo.

== Biography ==
=== Youth and studies ===
Maya Parbhoe's father owned a computer store in the mid-1990s, which is how she learned to program and tinker with computers as a child.

Her grandfather was politically active, and her father had similar ambitions.

On 4 September 2001, when Parbhoe was 12 years old, her father Winod Parbhoe, who was active in the casino business in Suriname, was murdered.

=== Entrepreneurship ===
Even before her studies, she started Quickship at the age of fifteen, a company in the field of real estate and logistics.

Since the mid-2020s, she has been the CEO of Daedalus Labs, a company in the field of bitcoin, and nostr. The company focuses on developing the infrastructure of the capital market using bitcoin technology. Additionally, she is a board member of the Surinamese engineering firm Icarus Geo.

She ensured that Suriname participates in the MIT REAP, the Regional Entrepreneurship Acceleration Program (REAP) of the Massachusetts Institute of Technology (MIT), which provides an approach to strengthening innovation-driven entrepreneurial ecosystems (innovation-driven entrepreneurial [IDE] ecosystems).

In practice, she aims to help innovate agriculture in Suriname, increase exports, and ensure that the emerging Surinamese oil sector becomes a success. Her ultimate goal for Suriname is the transformation towards prosperity, sustainability, and economic growth. However, according to her, the biggest challenge is to be taken seriously in the male-dominated world of Suriname.

In an interview with Parbode in May 2024, she shared her vision for payment systems in Suriname. The country is lagging behind in the digital transformation of the financial sector. Many Surinamese still pay in cash and do not have a debit- or credit card. As a result, Suriname has been missing out on many opportunities.

She spoke at panels in America and Europe and approached institutions and companies at the World Economic Forum in Davos to invest in Suriname, in an effort to help unlock financial opportunities for the country.

At her invitation, Canadian bitcoin entrepreneur Samson Mow visited Suriname at the end of 2023 to discuss the development of Suriname, using bitcoin, with President Chan Santokhi and Surinamese business leaders.

She is given space by party chairman Gregory Rusland to operate within the NPS and share her plans. The first version of her plans was shared through her website, where she details her plan, Save Suriname!.

== Political positions ==
Her most revolutionary plan is to replace the currency of Suriname with bitcoin, integrating it into the economy much more deeply than El Salvador, in which it is being purchased daily, held in reserve, and incubated as a medium of exchange in competition with the US dollar.

Parbhoe has stated in numerous interviews that she would like to replace taxation with funds from the sale of petroleum and other natural resources through a Sovereign Wealth Fund.
