= Riddle of the Sphinx (disambiguation) =

The Riddle of the Sphinx is an element of Greek mythology.

Riddle of the Sphinx may also refer to:

- Riddle of the Sphinx: An Egyptian Adventure, 2000 video game
  - Riddle of the Sphinx 2: The Omega Stone, 2003 video game and sequel to the 2000 game
- "The Riddle of the Sphinx" (Inside No. 9), episode of the British TV series Inside No. 9
- The Riddle of the Sphinx, 1975 album by Bloodstone
- The Riddle of the Sphinx, 2000 jazz album by Mark Gross
- Riddle of the Sphinx (video game), a 1982 Atari 2600 video game by Imagic
- "The Riddle of the Sphinx" (Westworld), an episode of the television series Westworld
- The Riddle of the Sphinx (film), a 1921 German silent adventure film
- Riddle of the Sphinx (Ninjago), an episode of Ninjago

== See also ==
- Riddles of the Sphinx, 1977 film
