= Maya Gold =

Hungarian pornographic actress (born 1981)

- Born: 11 August 1981 (age 45); Cegléd, Pest, Hungary
- Other names: Mary; Mya
- Occupations: Porn actress; model
- Years active: 2002–2004

Maya Gold (born 11 August 1981) is the stage name of a Hungarian pornographic actress. She began her career in 2002 and worked under other variants of the Maya Gold stage name, notably Maja Gold, Maya and Mya.

She won the 2003 Venus Award for Best New Starlet (Hungary).

In September 2005, she published her official autobiography in Hungarian, called Maya Gold: Az erotika üdvöskéje ("Maya Gold: The mascot of Erotica").

In late 2005, she officially announced her complete retirement from the adult industry. In fact, she stated that she had not shot any new material since early 2004 because she was in a serious relationship and was concerned about sexually transmitted infections. After finishing her career as a pornographic actress, she moved to Italy. She gave birth to a daughter in 2014.
