= Maia (given name) =

- Gender: Female

Origin
- Origin: Greek
- Meaning: "great" or "mother"

Other names
- Related names: Maria, Maija, Maiya, Maya, Mai, May, Mari

Maia is a feminine given name. It may be in reference to the mythic mother of Hermes. It is also a popular Māori name meaning "brave or confident."

Notable people with the name include:

- Maia Amano (born 2003), American trampoline gymnast
- maia arson crimew, Swiss developer and computer hacker
- Maia Asatiani, (born 1977), Georgian TV host
- Maia Bellon, American lawyer and environmentalist
- Maia Brewton (born 1977), American actress
- Maia Estianty (born 1976), Indonesian singer
- Maia Campbell (born 1976), American film and television actress
- Maia Chamberlain (born 1998), American fencer
- Maia Chiburdanidze (born 1961), Georgian chess grandmaster
- Maia Kealoha (born 2016), Hawaiian child actress
- Maia Lee (born 1983), Singaporean singer and businesswoman
- Maia Lewis, New Zealand women's cricketer
- Maia Makhateli, Georgian ballet dancer
- Maia Mitchell (born 1993), Australian actress
- Maia Morgenstern (born 1962), Romanian film and stage actress
- Maía, stage name of Colombian singer Mónica Andrea Vives Orozco
- Maia Ramsden, New Zealand athlete
- Maia Sandu (born 1972), Moldovan politician
- Maia Schwinghammer (born 2001), Canadian freestyle skier
- Maia Shibutani (born 1994), American ice dancer
- Maia Weintraub (born 2002), American national champion and Olympic foil fencer

== See also ==
- Maia (surname), a Portuguese surname
