= Mia Riddle =

American indie-folk singer-songwriter

Mia Riddle is an American indie-folk singer-songwriter born in Ventura, California. She and her eponymous six-piece band are based in Brooklyn, New York.

Current members include singer/songwriter/guitarist Mia Riddle, Dan Barry (guitar/vocals), James Rickman (bass/guitar), previous front man of ska band Slow Gherkin, David Wyss (bass/guitar), Amy Merrill (keyboard/vocals) and Jeffrey Neuberger (drums/vocals), previous member of Meowskers. The band describes their music as "equal parts desert expanse and outer-borough street lamp spirit," and their sound is influenced by bands like Fleetwood Mac, Wilco, PJ Harvey, MU330, and Neil Young.

Tours in the UK and US have included the Secret Garden Party (2007), Belladrum Tartan Heart Festival (2006, 2007) and SXSW (2009). Mia and Dan were featured live on the Bob Harris Country radio program on BBC Radio 2 in June 2008. In June 2008 the band was named "Artist of the Month" by The Deli Magazine, and were ranked #20 in the Deli Magazine Best of NYC issue.

Mia has performed with Rhett Miller and Norah Jones. The music video for the song "Open Wide" was featured in Mercedes-Benz' "Mixed Tape Music Magazine" v-log in March 2009.

== Discography ==
- Ship of Dreams EP (2005)
- Tender EP (2006)
- Tigers (2007)
- Hatchet Lake EP (2008)
- Tumble and Drag (2009)
