= Multi-Angle Imager for Aerosols =

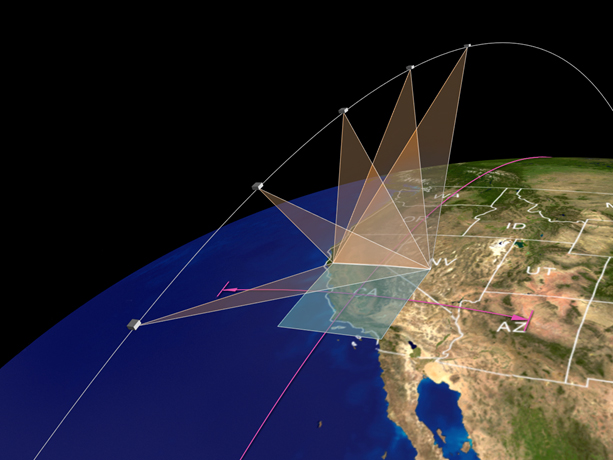
- Mission type: Earth observation
- Operator: Jet Propulsion Laboratory
- Website: https://maia.jpl.nasa.gov

Start of mission
- Launch date: November 2025 (planned)
- Rocket: Vega-C
- Launch site: Kourou ELV
- Contractor: Arianespace

Orbital parameters
- Regime: Low Earth Orbit
- Earth System Science Pathfinder

The Multi-Angle Imager for Aerosols (MAIA) is an instrument currently in development to support an investigation aimed at understanding the linkages between different types of airborne particles and human health. MAIA's twin-camera instrument will make radiometric and polarimetric measurements needed to characterize the sizes, compositions and quantities of particulate matter in air pollution. As part of the MAIA investigation, researchers will combine MAIA measurements with population health records to better understand the connections between aerosol pollutants and health problems such as adverse birth outcomes, cardiovascular and respiratory diseases, and premature deaths.

The MAIA instrument measures the radiance and polarization of sunlight scattered by atmospheric aerosols, from which the abundance and characteristics of ground-level particulate matter (PM) are derived. The instrument contains a pushbroom spectropolarimetric camera on a two-axis gimbal for multiangle viewing, frequent target revisits, and inflight calibration.

In March 2023, NASA and the Italian Space Agency (ASI) agreed to host MAIA on the PLATiNO-2 satellite, scheduled to be launched "before the end of 2024" on a Vega-C launch vehicle. By September 2023 the launch had been delayed to November 2025.

The MAIA instrument is being developed by the Jet Propulsion Laboratory, California Institute of Technology under a contract with the National Aeronautics and Space Administration (NASA). David Diner is the principal investigator. MAIA is a Venture-class investigation within NASA's Earth System Science Pathfinder Program, selected from NASA’s third Earth Venture Instrument competition.
