= Melanoma inhibitory activity =

Protein-coding gene in the species Homo sapiens

MIA
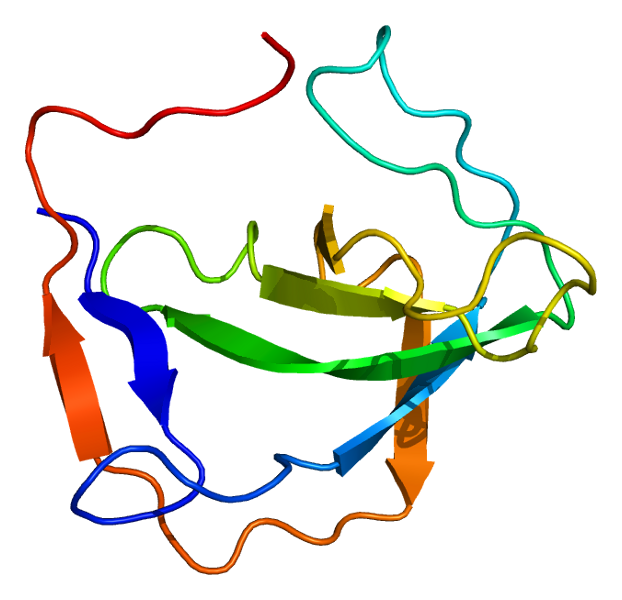

Identifiers
- Aliases: MIA, CD-RAP, Melanoma inhibitory activity, MIA SH3 domain containing
- External IDs: OMIM: 601340; MGI: 109615; GeneCards: MIA
Available structures
| PDB | Ortholog search: PDBe RCSB |
| PDB | List of PDB id codes 1HJD, 1I1J, 1K0X |

Gene location (Mouse)
| Chr. | Chromosome 7 (mouse) |
| Band | 7 A3|7 15.84 cM | Start | 26,879,167 bp |
| Band | 7 A3|7 15.84 cM | End | 26,880,582 bp |
RNA expression pattern
| Bgee | Human / Mouse (ortholog); Top expressed in: tibial nerve; pituitary gland; anterior pituitary; sural nerve; salivary gland; minor salivary glands; skin of abdomen; left coronary artery; appendix; canal of the cervix / Top expressed in: cartilage of bone; long bone; rib; neurocranium; chondrocranium; femur; humerus; lower leg; sphenoid bone; occiput; More reference expression data |
| BioGPS | n/a |
Gene ontology
| Molecular function | growth factor activity |
| Cellular component | extracellular region; extracellular space |
| Biological process | cell population proliferation; regulation of signaling receptor activity; signal transduction |
Sources:Amigo / QuickGO
Orthologs
| Databases | NCBI: entry |
| Species | Human | Mouse |
| Entrez | 8190 | 12587 |
| Ensembl | n/a | ENSMUSG00000089661 |
| UniProt | Q16674 | Q61865 |
| RefSeq (mRNA) | NM_006533; NM_001202553 | NM_019394 |
| RefSeq (protein) | NP_001189482; NP_006524 | NP_062267 |
| Location (UCSC) | n/a | Chr 7: 26.88 – 26.88 Mb |
| PubMed search |
- Wikidata
| View/Edit Human | View/Edit Mouse |

Melanoma-derived growth regulatory protein is a protein that in humans is encoded by the MIA gene.

It is a marker for melanoma.
