= Maia (surname) =

Family name

Maia is a Portuguese surname. Notable people with the surname include:

- Alfredo Maia (born 1962), Portuguese politician
- Bruna Reis Maia (born 1995), Brazilian actress and model, known as Bruna Marquezine
- Beatriz Haddad Maia (born 1996), Brazilian professional tennis player
- César Maia (born 1945), mayor of Rio de Janeiro, Brazil
- Circe Maia (born 1932), Uruguayan poet and translator
- Deidson Araújo Maia, a.k.a. Veloso, (born 1983), Brazilian footballer
- Demian Maia (born 1977), Brazilian jiu-jitsu and mixed martial arts fighter
- Gonçalo Mendes da Maia (c.1079–1170), Portuguese knight
- Luizão Maia (1949–2005), Brazilian musician
- Mel Maia (born 2004), Brazilian actress
- Miguel Maia (born 1971), Portuguese beach volleyball player
- Nuno Leal Maia (born 1947), Brazilian actor
- Salgueiro Maia (1944–1992), Portuguese captain during the Carnation Revolution
- Tim Maia (1942–1998), Brazilian musician

== See also ==
- House of Maia
- Maia (name)
