= Aqdash =

Ağdaş or Aghdash or Aqdash or Aq Dash or Agdash may refer to:

- Ağdaş, Azerbaijan, a city in Azerbaijan, capital of the Agdash District
- Agdash District, Azerbaijan, an administrative region
- Ağdaş, Jalilabad, Azerbaijan
- Ağdaş, Kalbajar, Azerbaijan
- Agdash Abbasabad, a summer camp in Khoda Afarin County, Iran
- Aqdash-e Olya, a village in Ardabil Province, Iran
- Aqdash-e Sofla, a village in Ardabil Province, Iran
- Aq Dash, East Azerbaijan, a village in Tabriz County, East Azerbaijan Province, Iran
- Aqdash, Khondab, a village in Khondab County, Markazi Province, Iran
- Aqdash, Saveh, a village in Saveh County, Markazi Province, Iran
- Aq Dash, Hamadan, a village in Hamadan County, Hamadan Province, Iran
- Aqdash, Kabudarahang, a village in Kabudarahang County, Hamadan Province, Iran
- Aqdash, Shirin Su, a village in Kabudarahang County, Hamadan Province, Iran
- Aghdash, Isfahan, a village in Isfahan Province, Iran
- Aqdash, Kalat, a village in Kalat County, Razavi Khorasan Province, Iran
- Aq Dash, Torbat-e Heydarieh, a village in Kalat County, Razavi Khorasan Province, Iran
- Aghdash, Chaldoran, West Azerbaijan Province, Iran
- Aghdash, Khoy, West Azerbaijan Province, Iran
- Aghdash, Miandoab, West Azerbaijan Province, Iran

== See also ==
- Aqdas, central religious text of the Baháʼí
