= Sefideh Khvan =

Village in East Azerbaijan province, Iran

Sefideh Khvan Persian: سفيده خوان
- Village
- Location within Iran
- Coordinates: 37°49′50″N 46°24′06″E
- Country: Iran
- Province: East Azerbaijan
- County: Tabriz
- District: Basmenj
- Rural District: Mehranrud

Population (2016)
  - Total: 1,929
- Time zone: UTC+3:30 (IRST)

Sefideh Khvan (Persian: سفيده خوان) (Note: Also romanized as Sefīdah Khvān and Sefīdeh Khvān; also known as Esperaj Khvan (اسپرج خوان), Espareh Khvān, Sefīd Khvān, and Sefīdeh Khān) is a village in Mehranrud Rural District of Basmenj District in Tabriz County, East Azerbaijan province, Iran.

== Demographics ==
=== Population ===
At the time of the 2006 National Census, the village's population was 2,213 in 548 households, when it was in Meydan Chay Rural District of the Central District. The following census in 2011 counted 2,030 people in 613 households. The 2016 census measured the population of the village as 1,929 people in 662 households.

In 2021, the rural district was separated from the district in the formation of Basmenj District, and Sefideh Khvan was transferred to Mehranrud Rural District created in the new district.
