= Hajj Abdal =

Village in East Azerbaijan province, Iran

Janqur Persian: جانقور
- Village
- Location within Iran
- Coordinates: 37°58′15″N 46°28′51″E
- Country: Iran
- Province: East Azerbaijan
- County: Tabriz
- District: Basmenj
- Rural District: Mehranrud

Population (2016)
  - Total: 937
- Time zone: UTC+3:30 (IRST)

Janqur (Persian: جانقور) (Note: Also romanized as Ḩājj ‘Abdāl; also known as Ḩājjī ‘Abdāl) is a village in Mehranrud Rural District of Basmenj District in Tabriz County, East Azerbaijan province, Iran.

== Demographics ==
=== Population ===
At the time of the 2006 National Census, the village's population was 754 in 201 households, when it was in Meydan Chay Rural District of the Central District. The following census in 2011 counted 871 people in 257 households. The 2016 census measured the population of the village as 937 people in 296 households.

In 2021, the rural district was separated from the district in the formation of Basmenj District, and Hajj Abdal was transferred to Mehranrud Rural District created in the new district.
