= Liqvan =

Village in East Azerbaijan province, Iran

Liqvan Persian: ليقوان
- Village
- Location within Iran
- Coordinates: 37°50′00″N 46°25′51″E
- Country: Iran
- Province: East Azerbaijan
- County: Tabriz
- District: Basmenj
- Rural District: Mehranrud

Population (2016)
  - Total: 5,122
- Time zone: UTC+3:30 (IRST)

Liqvan (Persian: ليقوان) (Note: Also known as Lighvān, Lighwan, and Līghwān) is a village in Mehranrud Rural District of Basmenj District in Tabriz County, East Azerbaijan province, Iran.

The village is famous for slight weather during summertime and cold weather in winter. The main occupations of the people are agriculture, dairy and gardening. Liqvan's traditional feta cheese is famous throughout Iran.

== Demographics ==
=== Population ===
At the time of the 2006 National Census, the village's population was 5,350 in 1,055 households, when it was in Meydan Chay Rural District of the Central District. The following census in 2011 counted 5,524 people in 1,553 households. The 2016 census measured the population of the village as 5,122 people in 1,543 households.

In 2021, the rural district was separated from the district in the formation of Basmenj District, and Liqvan was transferred to Mehranrud Rural District created in the new district.
