= Zarnaq, Tabriz =

Village in East Azerbaijan province, Iran

Zarnaq Persian: زرنق
- Village
- Location within Iran
- Coordinates: 37°58′52″N 46°25′49″E
- Country: Iran
- Province: East Azerbaijan
- County: Tabriz
- District: Basmenj
- Rural District: Mehranrud

Population (2016)
  - Total: 2,415
- Time zone: UTC+3:30 (IRST)

Zarnaq (Persian: زرنق) is a village in Mehranrud Rural District of Basmenj District in Tabriz County, East Azerbaijan province, Iran.

== Demographics ==
=== Population ===
At the time of the 2006 National Census, the village's population was 2,036 in 542 households, when it was in Meydan Chay Rural District of the Central District. The following census in 2011 counted 2,161 people in 640 households. The 2016 census measured the population of the village as 2,425 people in 715 households.

In 2021, the rural district was separated from the district in the formation of Basmenj District, and Zarnaq was transferred to Mehranrud Rural District created in the new district.
