= Heravi (Tabriz County) =

Village in East Azerbaijan province, Iran

Hervi Persian: هروي
- Village
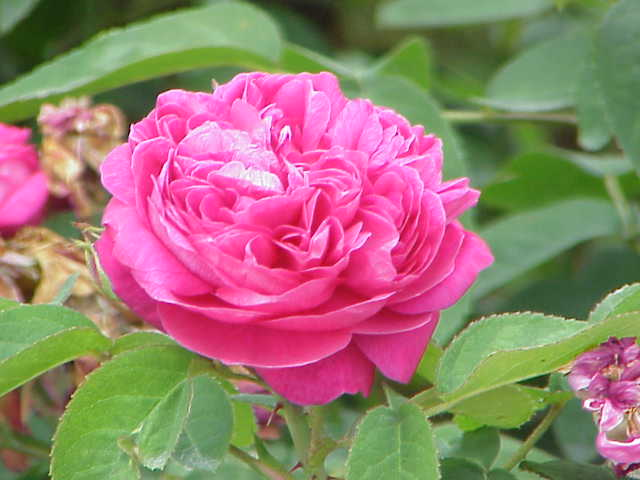
- Rosa damascena

- Location within Iran
- Coordinates: 37°55′22″N 46°28′44″E
- Country: Iran
- Province: East Azerbaijan
- County: Tabriz
- District: Basmenj
- Rural District: Mehranrud

Population (2016)
  - Total: 2,861
- Time zone: UTC+3:30 (IRST)

Hervi (Persian: هروي) (Note: Also romanized as Heravī and Hervī; also known as Herbī) is a village in, and the capital of, Mehranrud Rural District in Basmenj District of Tabriz County, East Azerbaijan province, Iran. The village's fame is due to its pleasurable climate. Heravi is also known for its damask rose.

== Demographics ==
=== Population ===
At the time of the 2006 National Census, the village's population was 2,399 in 640 households, when it was in Meydan Chay Rural District of the Central District. The following census in 2011 counted 2,649 people in 788 households. The 2016 census measured the population of the village as 2,861 people in 890 households.

In 2021, the rural district was separated from the district in the formation of Basmenj District, and Heravi was transferred to Mehranrud Rural District created in the new district.
