= Mehranrud Rural District =

Rural district in East Azerbaijan province, Iran

Mehranrud Rural District Persian: دهستان مهران‌رود
- Rural District
- Location within Iran
- Coordinates: 38°02′N 46°32′E
- Country: Iran
- Province: East Azerbaijan
- County: Tabriz
- District: Basmenj
- Established: 2021
- Capital: Heravi
- Time zone: UTC+3:30 (IRST)

Mehranrud Rural District (Persian: دهستان مهران‌رود) is in Basmenj District of Tabriz County, East Azerbaijan province, Iran. Its capital is the village of Heravi, whose population at the time of the 2016 National Census was 2,861 people in 890 households.

== History ==
In 2021, Meydan Chay Rural District and the city of Basmenj were separated from the Central District in the formation of Basmenj District, and Mehranrud Rural District was created in the new district.

== Other villages in the rural district ==
- Beyraq
- Hajj Abdal
- Janqur
- Liqvan
- Sefideh Khvan
- Shadbad-e Olya
- Zarnaq
