= Chavan, Iran =

Village in East Azerbaijan province, Iran

Chavan Persian: چاوان
- Village
- Location within Iran
- Coordinates: 37°59′26″N 46°23′29″E
- Country: Iran
- Province: East Azerbaijan
- County: Tabriz
- District: Central
- Rural District: Sard-e Sahra

Population (2016)
  - Total: 2,457
- Time zone: UTC+3:30 (IRST)

Chavan (Persian: چاوان) (Note: Also romanized as Chavān) is a village in Sard-e Sahra Rural District of the Central District in Tabriz County, East Azerbaijan province, Iran.

== Demographics ==
=== Population ===
At the time of the 2006 National Census, the village's population was 1,729 in 448 households, when it was in Meydan Chay Rural District. The following census in 2011 counted 2,201 people in 623 households. The 2016 census measured the population of the village as 2,457 people in 737 households.

Chavan was transferred to Sard-e Sahra Rural District in 2021.
