= Beyraq, East Azerbaijan =

Village in East Azerbaijan province, Iran

Beyraq Persian: بيرق
- Village
- Location within Iran
- Coordinates: 37°53′13″N 46°28′08″E
- Country: Iran
- Province: East Azerbaijan
- County: Tabriz
- District: Basmenj
- Rural District: Mehranrud

Population (2016)
  - Total: 3,498
- Time zone: UTC+3:30 (IRST)

Beyraq (Persian: بيرق) (Note: Also known as Bareh) is a village in Mehranrud Rural District of Basmenj District in Tabriz County, East Azerbaijan province, Iran.

== Demographics ==
=== Population ===
At the time of the 2006 National Census, the village's population was 3,703 in 914 households, when it was in Meydan Chay Rural District of the Central District. The following census in 2011 counted 3,855 people in 1,119 households. The 2016 census measured the population of the village as 3,498 people in 1,085 households.

In 2021, the rural district was separated from the district in the formation of Basmenj District, and Beyraq was transferred to Mehranrud Rural District created in the new district.
