= Kozanaq =

Kozanaq كزنق
- Village
- Location within Iran
- Coordinates: 38°22′08″N 46°18′29″E
- Country: Iran
- Province: East Azerbaijan
- County: Tabriz
- Bakhsh: Central
- Rural District: Esperan

Population (2006)
  - Total: 156
- Time zone: UTC+3:30 (IRST)
  - Summer (DST): UTC+4:30 (IRDT)

Kozanaq (Persian: كزنق, also Romanized as Kanzanaq; also known as Gazang, Gonzanaq, Kanzana, Kanzanagh, and Kotarnaq) is a village in Esperan Rural District, in the Central District of Tabriz County, East Azerbaijan Province, Iran. At the 2006 census, its population was 156, in 33 families.
