= Bagh-e Yaqub =

Village in East Azerbaijan province, Iran

Bagh-e Yaqub Persian: باغ يعقوب
- Village
- Location within Iran
- Coordinates: 38°00′25″N 46°26′23″E
- Country: Iran
- Province: East Azerbaijan
- County: Tabriz
- District: Basmenj
- Rural District: Meydan Chay

Population (2016)
  - Total: 815
- Time zone: UTC+3:30 (IRST)

Bagh-e Yaqub (Persian: باغ يعقوب) (Note: Also romanized as Bāgh Ya‘qūb and Bāgh-e Ya‘qūb; also known as Payagol and Payeh Gol) is a village in Meydan Chay Rural District of Basmenj District in Tabriz County, East Azerbaijan province, Iran.

== Demographics ==
=== Population ===
At the time of the 2006 National Census, the village's population was 515 in 142 households, when it was in the Central District. The following census in 2011 counted 562 people in 171 households. The 2016 census measured the population of the village as 815 people in 252 households.

In 2021, the rural district was separated from the district in the formation of Basmenj District.
