= Estiar, Tabriz =

Village in East Azerbaijan province, Iran

Estiar Persian: استيار
- Village
- Location within Iran
- Coordinates: 38°02′07″N 46°38′15″E
- Country: Iran
- Province: East Azerbaijan
- County: Tabriz
- District: Basmenj
- Rural District: Meydan Chay

Population (2016)
  - Total: 496
- Time zone: UTC+3:30 (IRST)

Estiar (Persian: استيار) (Note: Also romanized as Asteyār, Astīār, and Estīār; also known as Estiaré Mehranrood and Istiar) is a village in Meydan Chay Rural District of Basmenj District in Tabriz County, East Azerbaijan province, Iran.

== Demographics ==
=== Population ===
At the time of the 2006 National Census, the village's population was 508 in 89 households, when it was in the Central District. The following census in 2011 counted 400 people in 105 households. The 2016 census measured the population of the village as 496 people in 137 households.

In 2021, the rural district was separated from the district in the formation of Basmenj District.
