= Dizaj-e Leyli Khani =

Village in East Azerbaijan province, Iran

Dizaj-e Leyli Khani Persian: ديزج ليلي خاني
- Village
- Location within Iran
- Coordinates: 37°58′12″N 46°29′56″E
- Country: Iran
- Province: East Azerbaijan
- County: Tabriz
- District: Basmenj
- Rural District: Meydan Chay

Population (2016)
  - Total: 2,875
- Time zone: UTC+3:30 (IRST)

Dizaj-e Leyli Khani (Persian: ديزج ليلي خاني) (Note: Also romanized as Dīzaj-e Leylī Khānī; also known as Dīzaj-e Leylī Khvānī and Dīzaj-e Leylīkhān) is a village in Meydan Chay Rural District of Basmenj District in Tabriz County, East Azerbaijan province, Iran.

== Demographics ==
=== Population ===
At the time of the 2006 National Census, the village's population was 2,965 in 781 households, when it was in the Central District. The following census in 2011 counted 2,844 people in 858 households. The 2016 census measured the population of the village as 2,875 people in 878 households.

In 2021, the rural district was separated from the district in the formation of Basmenj District.
