= Gavar, Tabriz =

Village in East Azerbaijan province, Iran

Gavar Persian: گوار
- Village
- Location within Iran
- Coordinates: 38°03′58″N 46°31′15″E
- Country: Iran
- Province: East Azerbaijan
- County: Tabriz
- District: Basmenj
- Rural District: Meydan Chay

Population (2016)
  - Total: 114
- Time zone: UTC+3:30 (IRST)

Gavar (Persian: گوار) (Note: Also romanized as Gāvār and Gavār; also known as Giavar, Gyavar, and Kavār) is a village in Meydan Chay Rural District of Basmenj District in Tabriz County, East Azerbaijan province, Iran.

== Demographics ==
=== Population ===
At the time of the 2006 National Census, the village's population was 175 in 45 households, when it was in the Central District. The following census in 2011 counted 159 people in 45 households. The 2016 census measured the population of the village as 114 people in 32 households.

In 2021, the rural district was separated from the district in the formation of Basmenj District.
