= Bababaghi Hospice =

Village in East Azerbaijan province, Iran

Bababaghi Hospice Persian: اسايشگاه باباباغي
- Village
- Location within Iran
- Coordinates: 38°09′11″N 46°18′46″E
- Country: Iran
- Province: East Azerbaijan
- County: Tabriz
- District: Central
- Rural District: Esperan

Population (2016)
  - Total: 322
- Time zone: UTC+3:30 (IRST)

Bababaghi Hospice (Persian: اسايشگاه باباباغي) (Note: Romanized as Asāīyeshgāh-e Bābābāghī) is a village in Esperan Rural District of the Central District in Tabriz County, East Azerbaijan province, Iran. A hospital was established here, mainly through the efforts of Dr. Mobayyen, for individuals with leprosy. The hospital was established in 1933, with its first patients coming from Arpadarrassi.

== Demographics ==
=== Population ===
At the time of the 2006 National Census, the village's population was 409 in 150 households. The following census in 2011 counted 398 people in 116 households. The 2016 census measured the population of the village as 322 people in 122 households.

== In media ==
The House is Black, a short documentary film features footage from the leper colony. It was directed by Forugh Farrokhzad and made in collaboration with a leprosy charity.
