= Shah Bolagh =

Shah Bolagh (Persian: شاهبلاغ) may refer to:

- Shah Bolagh, East Azerbaijan
- Shah Bolagh, Hamadan
- Shah Bolagh, Barf Anbar, Fereydunshahr County, Isfahan Province
- Shah Bolagh, Pishkuh-e Mugui, Fereydunshahr County, Isfahan Province
- Shah Bolagh, Semnan

== See also ==
- Shah Bodagh
