= Kolluk Daraq =

Village in East Azerbaijan province, Iran

Kolluk Daraq Persian: كلوكدرق
- Village
- Location within Iran
- Coordinates: 38°01′26″N 46°39′34″E
- Country: Iran
- Province: East Azerbaijan
- County: Tabriz
- District: Basmenj
- Rural District: Meydan Chay

Population (2016)
  - Total: 85
- Time zone: UTC+3:30 (IRST)

Kolluk Daraq (Persian: كلوكدرق) (Note: Also romanized as Kollook Daraq, Kollūk Daraq, and Kolūk Daraq; also known as Kollūg Dareh, Kolūkh Dareh, Kūlūk Dareh, Kuluk Darreh, and Kulyukdara) is a village in Meydan Chay Rural District of Basmenj District in Tabriz County, East Azerbaijan province, Iran.

== Demographics ==
=== Population ===
At the time of the 2006 National Census, the village's population was 104 in 22 households, when it was in the Central District. The following census in 2011 counted 88 people in 24 households. The 2016 census measured the population of the village as 85 people in 24 households.

In 2021, the rural district was separated from the district in the formation of Basmenj District.
