= Nematabad, East Azerbaijan =

Village in East Azerbaijan province, Iran

Nematabad Persian: نعمت اباد
- Village
- Location within Iran
- Coordinates: 38°00′40″N 46°27′21″E
- Country: Iran
- Province: East Azerbaijan
- County: Tabriz
- District: Basmenj
- Rural District: Meydan Chay

Population (2016)
  - Total: 1,898
- Time zone: UTC+3:30 (IRST)

Nematabad (Persian: نعمت اباد) (Note: Also romanized as Ne‘matābād; also known as Nemedab and Ni‘matābād) is a village in, and the capital of, Meydan Chay Rural District in Basmenj District of Tabriz County, East Azerbaijan province, Iran. The previous capital of the rural district was the village of Kond Rud.

== Demographics ==
=== Population ===
At the time of the 2006 National Census, the village's population was 2,020 in 551 households, when it was in the Central District. The following census in 2011 counted 2,276 people in 671 households. The 2016 census measured the population of the village as 1,848 people in 618 households.

In 2021, the rural district was separated from the district in the formation of Basmenj District.
