= Tuyqun =

Village in East Azerbaijan province, Iran

Tuyqun Persian: طويقون
- Village
- Location within Iran
- Coordinates: 38°04′27″N 46°30′21″E
- Country: Iran
- Province: East Azerbaijan
- County: Tabriz
- District: Basmenj
- Rural District: Meydan Chay

Population (2016)
  - Total: 284
- Time zone: UTC+3:30 (IRST)

Tuyqun (Persian: طويقون) (Note: Also romanized as Tūyqūn) is a village in Meydan Chay Rural District of Basmenj District in Tabriz County, East Azerbaijan province, Iran.

== Demographics ==
=== Population ===
At the time of the 2006 National Census, the village's population was 313 in 79 households, when it was in the Central District. The following census in 2011 counted 295 people in 85 households. The 2016 census measured the population of the village as 284 people in 81 households.

In 2021, the rural district was separated from the district in the formation of Basmenj District.
