= Karkaj =

Neighborhood in East Azerbaijan province, Iran

Karkaj Persian: كركج
- Neighborhood
- Location within Iran
- Coordinates: 38°02′09″N 46°25′57″E
- Country: Iran
- Province: East Azerbaijan
- County: Tabriz
- District: Central
- City: Tabriz

Population (2016)
  - Total: 8,496
- Time zone: UTC+3:30 (IRST)

Karkaj (Persian: كركج) (Note: Also known in Turkish as Gargaj, Karga, Kargaj, Kargeh, and Kiarga) is a neighborhood in the city of Tabriz in the Central District of Tabriz County, East Azerbaijan province, Iran.

== Demographics ==
=== Population ===
At the time of the 2006 National Census, Karkaj's population was 8,228 in 2,162 households, when it was a village in Meydan Chay Rural District. The following census in 2011 counted 8,931 people in 2,536 households. The 2016 census measured the population of the village as 8,496 people in 2,503 households.

Karkaj was annexed by the city of Tabriz in 2018. In 2021, the rural district was separated from the district in the formation of Basmenj District.
