= Shadbad-e Olya =

Village in East Azerbaijan province, Iran

Shadbad-e Olya Persian: شادبادعليا
- Village
- Location within Iran
- Coordinates: 37°58′57″N 46°25′15″E
- Country: Iran
- Province: East Azerbaijan
- County: Tabriz
- District: Basmenj
- Rural District: Mehranrud

Population (2016)
  - Total: 2,229
- Time zone: UTC+3:30 (IRST)

Shadbad-e Olya (Persian: شادبادعليا) (Note: Also romanized as Shādbād-e ‘Olyā; also known as Shādābād-e Bālā and Shādābād-e ‘Olyā) is a village in Mehranrud Rural District of Basmenj District in Tabriz County, East Azerbaijan province, Iran.

== Demographics ==
=== Population ===
At the time of the 2006 National Census, the village's population was 1,884 in 508 households, when it was in Meydan Chay Rural District of the Central District. The following census in 2011 counted 2,046 people in 593 households. The 2016 census measured the population of the village as 2,229 people in 675 households.

In 2021, the rural district was separated from the district in the formation of Basmenj District, and Shadbad-e Olya was transferred to Mehranrud Rural District created in the new district.
