= Kujuvar =

Neighborhood in East Azerbaijan province, Iran

Kujuvar Persian: کوجووار
- Neighborhood
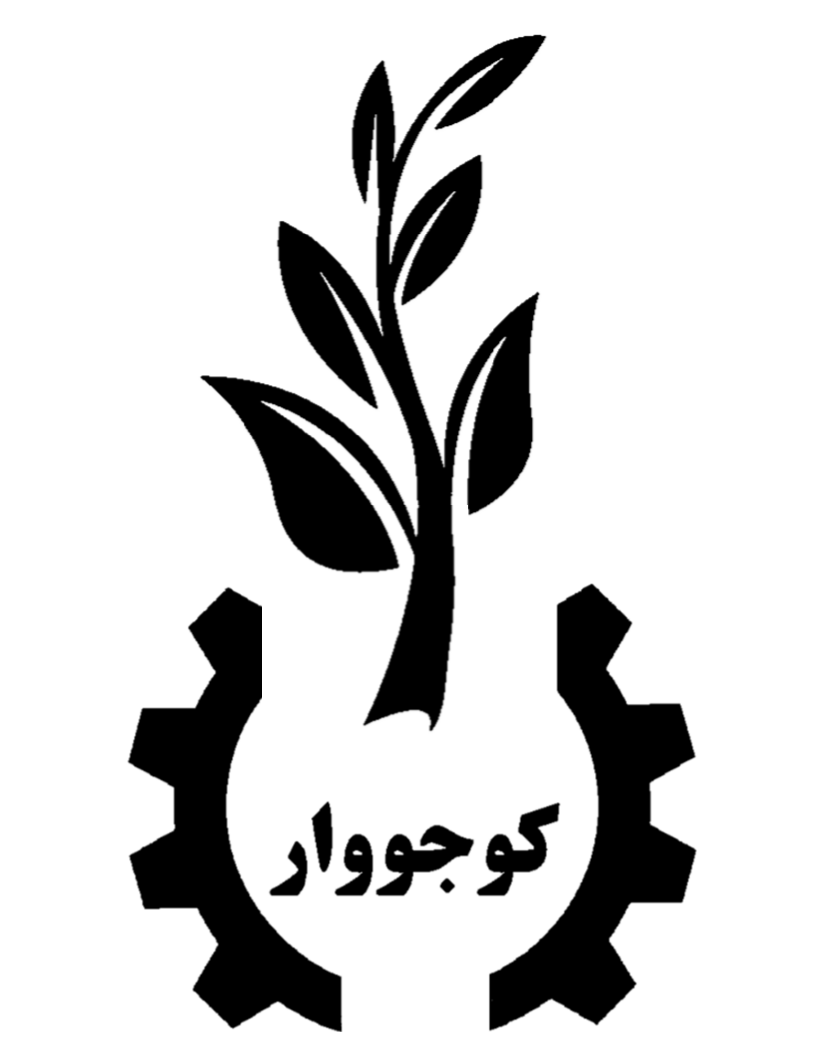
- Kujuvar Logo: Symbol of Industry and Ecosystem

- Location within Iran
- Coordinates: 38°03′40″N 46°08′18″E
- Country: Iran
- Province: East Azerbaijan
- County: Tabriz
- District: Central
- City: Tabriz
- Elevation: 1,330 m (4,360 ft)

Population (2016)
  - Total: 6,001
- Time zone: UTC+3:30 (IRST)
- Area code: 041

Kujuvar (Persian: كوجووار) (Note: Formerly known as Kojabad (كجاباد), also romanized as Kajābād, Kojāābād, and Kojābād; also known as Gujavār, Kajvān, Kojavār, Kojovār, and Kyudzhuvar; Azerbaijani: Kücüvar) is a neighborhood in the city of Tabriz in the Central District of Tabriz County, East Azerbaijan province, Iran.

== Demographics ==
=== Population ===
At the time of the 2006 National Census, Kujuvar's population was 5,661 in 1,498 households, when it was the village of Kojaabad in Aji Chay Rural District. (It had been transferred from Sard-e Sahra Rural District in 1997.) The following census in 2011 counted 5,965 people in 1,744 households, by which time the village's name had been changed to Kujuvar. The 2016 census measured the population of the village as 6,001 people in 1,881 households. Kujuvar was annexed by the city of Tabriz in 2018.
