= Kond Rud, Tabriz =

Village in East Azerbaijan province, Iran

Kond Rud Persian: كندرود
- Village
- Location within Iran
- Coordinates: 38°00′34″N 46°28′40″E
- Country: Iran
- Province: East Azerbaijan
- County: Tabriz
- District: Basmenj
- Rural District: Meydan Chay

Population (2016)
  - Total: 8,518
- Time zone: UTC+3:30 (IRST)

Kond Rud (Persian: كندرود) (Note: Also romanized as Kond Rūd; also known as Kand Roodé Mehranrood, Kondo Rūd, Kondorī, and Kunduri) is a village in, and the former capital of, Meydan Chay Rural District in Basmenj District of Tabriz County, East Azerbaijan province, Iran. The capital of the rural district has been transferred to the village of Nematabad.

== Demographics ==
=== Population ===
At the time of the 2006 National Census, the village's population was 6,758 in 1,744 households, when it was in the Central District. The following census in 2011 counted 8,725 people in 2,561 households. The 2016 census measured the population of the village as 8,518 people in 2,671 households. It was the most populous village in its rural district.

In 2021, the rural district was separated from the district in the formation of Basmenj District.
