= Malek Kian =

Village in East Azerbaijan province, Iran

Malek Kian Persian: ملک‌کیان
- Village
- Location within Iran
- Coordinates: 38°03′24″N 46°32′29″E
- Country: Iran
- Province: East Azerbaijan
- County: Tabriz
- District: Basmenj
- Rural District: Meydan Chay

Population (2016)
  - Total: 1,216
- Time zone: UTC+3:30 (IRST)

Malek Kian (Persian: ملک‌کیان) (Note: Also romanized as Malek Keyān, Malek Kīān, Maliakian, and Malyakan) is a village in Meydan Chay Rural District of Basmenj District in Tabriz County, East Azerbaijan province, Iran.

== Demographics ==
=== Population ===
At the time of the 2006 National Census, the village's population was 1,066 in 269 households, when it was in the Central District. The following census in 2011 counted 1,129 people in 325 households. The 2016 census measured the population of the village as 1,216 people in 352 households.

In 2021, the rural district was separated from the district in the formation of Basmenj District.
