= Eskandar, East Azerbaijan =

Village in East Azerbaijan province, Iran

Eskandar Persian: اسكندر
- Village
- Location within Iran
- Coordinates: 38°01′16″N 46°34′33″E
- Country: Iran
- Province: East Azerbaijan
- County: Tabriz
- District: Basmenj
- Rural District: Meydan Chay

Population (2016)
  - Total: 1,301
- Time zone: UTC+3:30 (IRST)

Eskandar (Persian: اسكندر) (Note: Also romanized as Eskandar; also known as Iskandār and Iskender) is a village in Meydan Chay Rural District of Basmenj District in Tabriz County, East Azerbaijan province, Iran.

== Demographics ==
=== Population ===
At the time of the 2006 National Census, the village's population was 1,377 in 336 households, when it was in the Central District. The following census in 2011 counted 1,318 people in 368 households. The 2016 census measured the population of the village as 1,301 people in 382 households.

In 2021, the rural district was separated from the district in the formation of Basmenj District.
