= Esperón =

Esperón is a surname. Notable people with the surname include:

- Ezequiel Esperón (1996–2019), Argentinian footballer
- Grégorio Juan Esperón (1912–2000), Argentine professional football player and coach
- Hermogenes Esperon (born 1952), retired Philippine Army general, National Security Adviser
- Ignacio Fernández Esperón (aka Tata Nacho) (1894–1968), Mexican composer
- Jose Francisco Fuentes Esperon (1966–2009), Mexican politician
- Manuel Esperón (1911–2011), Mexican songwriter and composer
- Natalia Esperón (born 1974), Mexican actress and former model
- Soledad Esperón (born 1985), retired Argentine tennis player

== See also ==
- Esparron (disambiguation)
- Esperan (disambiguation)
- Espero (disambiguation)
