= Lahijan (disambiguation) =

Lahijan (Persian: لاهیجان) or its variants may refer to:

== Iran ==
=== East Azerbaijan province ===
- Lahijan, East Azerbaijan, a village in Tabriz County
- Lahijan Rural District (Tabriz County), an administrative division of Tabriz County

=== Gilan province ===
- Lahijan, a city in Lahijan County
- Lahijan and Siahkal (electoral district)
- Lahijan County, an administrative division

=== Kerman province ===
- Lahijan, Kerman, a village in Rafsanjan County

=== West Azerbaijan province ===
- Lahijan Rural District (Piranshahr County), an administrative division of Piranshahr County
- Lahijan-e Gharbi Rural District, an administrative division of Piranshahr County
- Lahijan-e Sharqi Rural District, an administrative division of Piranshahr County
