= Khvajeh Dizaj =

Village in East Azerbaijan province, Iran

Khvajeh Dizaj Persian: خواجه ديزج
- Village
- Location within Iran
- Coordinates: 38°07′14″N 46°09′38″E
- Country: Iran
- Province: East Azerbaijan
- County: Tabriz
- District: Central
- Rural District: Aji Chay

Population (2016)
  - Total: 1,944
- Time zone: UTC+3:30 (IRST)

Khvajeh Dizaj (Persian: خواجه ديزج) (Note: Also romanized as Khvājeh Dīzaj; also known as Khajeh Dizaj, Khodza-diza, and Khvājeh Dīzeh) is a village in Aji Chay Rural District of the Central District in Tabriz County, East Azerbaijan province, Iran.

== Demographics ==
=== Population ===
At the time of the 2006 National Census, the village's population was 1,581 in 415 households. The following census in 2011 counted 1,979 people in 581 households. The 2016 census measured the population of the village as 1,944 people in 616 households.
