= Evli =

Evli (Persian: اولي) may refer to:

- Ughli, Iran
- Uli, Iran
