= Anarjan, Tabriz =

Village in East Azerbaijan province, Iran

Anarjan Persian: انرجان
- Village
- Location within Iran
- Coordinates: 37°55′42″N 46°15′13″E
- Country: Iran
- Province: East Azerbaijan
- County: Tabriz
- District: Central
- Rural District: Sard-e Sahra

Population (2016)
  - Total: 909
- Time zone: UTC+3:30 (IRST)

Anarjan (Persian: انرجان) (Note: Also romanized as Anarjān) is a village in Sard-e Sahra Rural District of the Central District in Tabriz County, East Azerbaijan province, Iran.

== Demographics ==
=== Population ===
At the time of the 2006 National Census, the village's population was 944 in 201 households. The following census in 2011 counted 652 people in 161 households. The 2016 census measured the population of the village as 909 people in 243 households.
