= Qareh Tappeh, Tabriz =

Village in East Azerbaijan province, Iran

Qareh Tappeh Persian: قره‌تپه
- Village
- Location within Iran
- Coordinates: 37°59′12″N 46°00′38″E
- Country: Iran
- Province: East Azerbaijan
- County: Tabriz
- District: Khosrowshah
- Rural District: Tazeh Kand

Population (2016)
  - Total: 486
- Time zone: UTC+3:30 (IRST)

Qareh Tappeh (Persian: قره‌تپه) (Note: Also known as Qeshlāq-e Qareh Tappeh (قشلاق قره تپه)) is a village in Tazeh Kand Rural District of Khosrowshah District in Tabriz County, East Azerbaijan province, Iran.

== Demographics ==
=== Population ===
At the time of the 2006 National Census, the village's population was 436 in 120 households. The following census in 2011 counted 486 people in 161 households. The 2016 census measured the population of the village as 486 people in 158 households.
