= Akhula =

Akhula may refer to:

- Akhula, Armenia
- Akhula, Iran
