= Kord Kandi =

Kord Kandi, Kard Kandi, Kurd Kandi, Kurdkandi, Kardkandi, Kordkandi (Persian: كردكندي), also rendered as Kurd-Kandi, may refer to various places in Iran:

- Kord Kandi, Ardabil
- Kard Kandi, Germi, Ardabil Province
- Kord Kandi, Bostanabad, East Azerbaijan Province
- Kord Kandi, Charuymaq, East Azerbaijan Province
- Kord Kandi, Tabriz, East Azerbaijan Province
- Kordkandi, Isfahan
- Kord Kandi, Chaldoran, West Azerbaijan Province
- Kord Kandi, Miandoab, West Azerbaijan Province
- Kord Kandi, Shahin Dezh, West Azerbaijan Province
- Kord Kandi, Showt, West Azerbaijan Province
- Kord Kandi, Zanjan
