= Bagh-e Maruf =

Village in East Azerbaijan province, Iran

Bagh-e Maruf Persian: باغ معروف
- Village
- Location within Iran
- Coordinates: 38°02′30″N 46°06′22″E
- Country: Iran
- Province: East Azerbaijan
- County: Tabriz
- District: Central
- Rural District: Aji Chay

Population (2016)
  - Total: 12,068
- Time zone: UTC+3:30 (IRST)
- Area code: 041
- Website: baghmaruf.ir/ bagmaruf.ir/ varzeshebagmaruf.blogfa.com/ baghmaruf.loxblog.com

Bagh-e Maruf (Persian: باغ معروف) (Note: Also romanized as Bāgh Ma‘rūf, Bāgh-e Ma‘rūf, and Bāghe Ma’roof; also known as Bal Marit) is a village in Aji Chay Rural District of the Central District in Tabriz County, East Azerbaijan province, Iran.

== Demographics ==
=== Population ===
At the time of the 2006 National Census, the village's population was 7,961 in 2,033 households. The following census in 2011 counted 11,233 people in 3,223 households. The 2016 census measured the population of the village as 12,068 people in 3,695 households. It was the most populous village in its rural district.
