= Baranlu =

Village in East Azerbaijan province, Iran

Baranlu Persian: بارانلو
- Village
- Location within Iran
- Coordinates: 37°59′54″N 46°02′25″E
- Country: Iran
- Province: East Azerbaijan
- County: Tabriz
- District: Khosrowshah
- Rural District: Tazeh Kand

Population (2016)
  - Total: 1,242
- Time zone: UTC+3:30 (IRST)

Baranlu (Persian: بارانلو) (Note: Also romanized as Bārānlū; also known as Bārā'lū) is a village in Tazeh Kand Rural District of Khosrowshah District in Tabriz County, East Azerbaijan province, Iran.

== Demographics ==
=== Population ===
At the time of the 2006 National Census, the village's population was 1,169 in 299 households. The following census in 2011 counted 1,248 people in 343 households. The 2016 census measured the population of the village as 1,242 people in 400 households.
