= Fathabad, East Azerbaijan =

Neighborhood in East Azerbaijan province, Iran

Fathabad Persian: فتح اباد
- Neighborhood
- Location within Iran
- Coordinates: 38°00′50″N 46°23′38″E
- Country: Iran
- Province: East Azerbaijan
- County: Tabriz
- District: Central
- City: Tabriz

Population (2016)
  - Total: 1,616
- Time zone: UTC+3:30 (IRST)

Fathabad (Persian: فتح اباد) (Note: Also romanized as Fatḩābād; also known as Patava) is a neighborhood in the city of Tabriz in the Central District of Tabriz County, East Azerbaijan province, Iran.

== Demographics ==
=== Population ===
At the time of the 2006 National Census, Fathabad's population was 1,610 in 461 households, when it was a village in Meydan Chay Rural District. The following census in 2011 counted 1,921 people in 580 households. The 2016 census measured the population of the village as 1,616 people in 506 households.

Fathabad was annexed by the city of Tabriz in 2018. In 2021, the rural district was separated from the district in the formation of Basmenj District.
