= Qezel Dizaj =

Village in East Azerbaijan province, Iran

Qezel Dizaj Persian: قزل ديزج
- Village
- Location within Iran
- Coordinates: 38°04′29″N 45°59′31″E
- Country: Iran
- Province: East Azerbaijan
- County: Tabriz
- District: Central
- Rural District: Aji Chay

Population (2016)
  - Total: 1,580
- Time zone: UTC+3:30 (IRST)

Qezel Dizaj (Persian: قزل ديزج) (Note: Also romanized as Qezel Dīzaj; also known as Ghezel Dizaj, Kyzyl-Diza, Qezel Dīzeh, and Qizil Dīzeh) is a village in Aji Chay Rural District of the Central District in Tabriz County, East Azerbaijan province, Iran.

== Demographics ==
=== Population ===
At the time of the 2006 National Census, the village's population was 1,333 in 231 households. The following census in 2011 counted 1,574 people in 398 households. The 2016 census measured the population of the village as 1,580 people in 365 households.
