= Mayan-e Olya, East Azerbaijan =

Village in East Azerbaijan province, Iran

Mayan-e Olya Persian: مايان عليا
- Village
- Location within Iran
- Coordinates: 38°06′20″N 46°06′43″E
- Country: Iran
- Province: East Azerbaijan
- County: Tabriz
- District: Central
- Rural District: Aji Chay

Population (2016)
  - Total: 2,871
- Time zone: UTC+3:30 (IRST)

Mayan-e Olya (Persian: مايان عليا) (Note: Also romanized as Māyān-e ‘Olyā and Maiané Olya; also known as Kichik Mayān, Māyān Bālā, Māyān-e Bālā, Māyan-e Colyā, Yukari Mayan, and Yūkhārī Māyān) is a village in Aji Chay Rural District of the Central District in Tabriz County, East Azerbaijan province, Iran.

== Demographics ==
=== Population ===
At the time of the 2006 National Census, the village's population was 2,244 in 486 households. The following census in 2011 counted 2,579 people in 676 households. The 2016 census measured the population of the village as 2,871 people in 842 households.
