= Aspos =

Village in East Azerbaijan province, Iran

Aspos Persian: اسپس
- Village
- Location within Iran
- Coordinates: 38°00′06″N 46°07′11″E
- Country: Iran
- Province: East Azerbaijan
- County: Tabriz
- District: Khosrowshah
- Rural District: Lahijan

Population (2016)
  - Total: 690
- Time zone: UTC+3:30 (IRST)

Aspos (Persian: اسپس) (Note: Also known as Asbos and Aspūs) is a village in Lahijan Rural District (Note: Formerly Shurakat-e Shomali Rural District) of Khosrowshah District in Tabriz County, East Azerbaijan province, Iran.

== Demographics ==
=== Population ===
At the time of the 2006 National Census, the village's population was 552 in 142 households. The following census in 2011 counted 649 people in 192 households. The 2016 census measured the population of the village as 690 people in 203 households.
