= Asenjan =

Village in East Azerbaijan province, Iran

Asenjan Persian: اسنجان
- Village
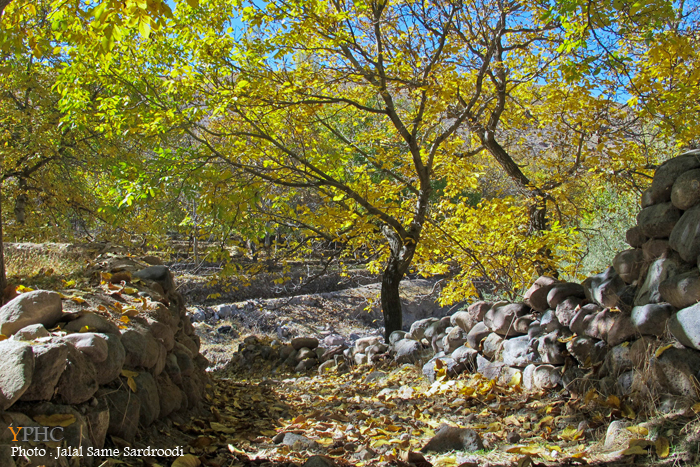
- Autumn landscape in Asenjan village

- Location within Iran
- Coordinates: 37°57′18″N 46°13′51″E
- Country: Iran
- Province: East Azerbaijan
- County: Tabriz
- District: Central
- Rural District: Sard-e Sahra

Population (2016)
  - Total: 1,745
- Time zone: UTC+3:30 (IRST)

Asenjan (Persian: اسنجان) (Note: Also romanized as Asenjān; also known as Asinjah, Asīnjān, and Espanjān) is a village in, and the capital of, Sard-e Sahra Rural District in the Central District of Tabriz County, East Azerbaijan province, Iran. The previous capital of the rural district was the village of Khelejan, now a neighborhood in the city of Tabriz.

== Demographics ==
=== Population ===
At the time of the 2006 National Census, the village's population was 1,451 in 265 households. The following census in 2011 counted 1,633 people in 397 households. The 2016 census measured the population of the village as 1,745 people in 437 households. It was the most populous village in its rural district.
