= Varnaq =

Village in East Azerbaijan province, Iran

Varnaq Persian: ورنق
- Village
- Location within Iran
- Coordinates: 37°59′33″N 46°10′41″E
- Country: Iran
- Province: East Azerbaijan
- County: Tabriz
- District: Central
- Rural District: Sard-e Sahra

Population (2016)
  - Total: 471
- Time zone: UTC+3:30 (IRST)

Varnaq (Persian: ورنق) (Note: Also romanized as Varanagh and Verana) is a village in Sard-e Sahra Rural District of the Central District in Tabriz County, East Azerbaijan province, Iran.

== Demographics ==
=== Population ===
At the time of the 2006 National Census, the village's population was 470 in 118 households. The following census in 2011 counted 495 people in 145 households. The 2016 census measured the population of the village as 471 people in 149 households.
