= Sheykh Hasan, East Azerbaijan =

Village in East Azerbaijan province, Iran

Sheykh Hasan Persian: شيخ حسن
- Village
- Location within Iran
- Coordinates: 38°01′16″N 46°06′28″E
- Country: Iran
- Province: East Azerbaijan
- County: Tabriz
- District: Khosrowshah
- Rural District: Lahijan

Population (2016)
  - Total: 2,515
- Time zone: UTC+3:30 (IRST)

Sheykh Hasan (Persian: شيخ حسن) (Note: Also romanized as Shaikh Hasan, Sheikh Ḩasan, and Sheykh Hasan; also known as Sheykh Khasan) is a village in, and the capital of, Lahijan Rural District (Note: Formerly Shurakat-e Shomali Rural District) in Khosrowshah District of Tabriz County, East Azerbaijan province, Iran. The previous capital of the rural district was the village of Lahijan, now a city.

== Demographics ==
=== Population ===
At the time of the 2006 National Census, the village's population was 2,240 in 552 households. The following census in 2011 counted 2,667 people in 811 households. The 2016 census measured the population of the village as 2,515 people in 776 households.
