= Hezehburan =

Village in East Azerbaijan province, Iran

Hezehburan Persian: هزه بوران
- Village
- Location within Iran
- Coordinates: 37°53′11″N 46°16′59″E
- Country: Iran
- Province: East Azerbaijan
- County: Tabriz
- District: Central
- Rural District: Sard-e Sahra

Population (2016)
  - Total: 834
- Time zone: UTC+3:30 (IRST)

Hezehburan (Persian: هزه بوران) (Note: Also romanized as Hezehbūrān; also known as Hezārbarān and Hezehberān) is a village in Sard-e Sahra Rural District of the Central District in Tabriz County, East Azerbaijan province, Iran.

== Demographics ==
=== Population ===
At the time of the 2006 National Census, the village's population was 962 in 266 households. The following census in 2011 counted 891 people in 268 households. The 2016 census measured the population of the village as 834 people in 267 households.
