= Nowjeh Deh, Tabriz =

Village in East Azerbaijan province, Iran

Nowjeh Deh Persian: نوجه ده
- Village
- Location within Iran
- Coordinates: 38°02′51″N 46°02′26″E
- Country: Iran
- Province: East Azerbaijan
- County: Tabriz
- District: Khosrowshah
- Rural District: Tazeh Kand

Population (2016)
  - Total: 2,397
- Time zone: UTC+3:30 (IRST)

Nowjeh Deh (Persian: نوجه ده) (Note: Also known as Navābī, Navādeh, Novābī, Novādeh Pīr, Nuvābi, and Nuvady) is a village in Tazeh Kand Rural District of Khosrowshah District in Tabriz County, East Azerbaijan province, Iran.

== Demographics ==
=== Population ===
At the time of the 2006 National Census, the village's population was 2,057 in 372 households. The following census in 2011 counted 2,272 people in 605 households. The 2016 census measured the population of the village as 2,397 people in 686 households.
