= Alvar (disambiguation) =

An alvar is a kind of biological environment poor in soil.

Alvar or Alvars may also refer to:

- Alvar (given name)
- Álvar Núñez Cabeza de Vaca, a Spanish explorer of the New World
- Alvar, Armenia, a village in Armenia
- Alvar, Iran (disambiguation), any of a number of places in Iran
- Alvars, a collection of Tamil saints
- "Alvar", a song from Tales of Us, by Goldfrapp

== See also ==
- Alva (disambiguation)
- Alwa (disambiguation)
- Alwar, city in Rajasthan, India
  - Alwar (Lok Sabha Constituency)
