= Ana Khatun =

Neighborhood in East Azerbaijan province, Iran

Ana Khatun Persian: اناخاتون
- Neighborhood
- Location within Iran
- Coordinates: 38°09′21″N 46°15′17″E
- Country: Iran
- Province: East Azerbaijan
- County: Tabriz
- District: Central
- City: Tabriz

Population (2016)
  - Total: 8,288
- Time zone: UTC+3:30 (IRST)

Ana Khatun (Persian: اناخاتون) (Note: Also romanized as Ānā Khātūn and Anakhatoon) is a neighborhood in the city of Tabriz in the Central District of Tabriz County, East Azerbaijan province, Iran.

== Demographics ==
=== Population ===
At the time of the 2006 National Census, Ana Khatun's population was 2,052 in 527 households, when it was a village in Esperan Rural District. The following census in 2011 counted 6,812 people in 1,884 households. The 2016 census measured the population of the village as 8,288 people in 2,368 households. Ana Khatun was annexed by the city of Tabriz in 2018.
