= Kord Kandi, Tabriz =

Kord Kandi كردكندي
- Village
- Location within Iran
- Coordinates: 38°20′52″N 46°21′54″E
- Country: Iran
- Province: East Azerbaijan
- County: Tabriz
- Bakhsh: Central
- Rural District: Esperan

Population (2006)
  - Total: 43
- Time zone: UTC+3:30 (IRST)
  - Summer (DST): UTC+4:30 (IRDT)

Kord Kandi (Persian: كردكندي, also Romanized as Kord Kandī; also known as Kordlar, Kūkandī, Kukendi, and Kukendy) is a village in Esperan Rural District, in the Central District of Tabriz County, East Azerbaijan Province, Iran. At the 2006 census, its population was 43, in 11 families.
