= Gomanj-e Sofla =

Gomanj-e Sofla گمانج سفلي
- Village
- Location within Iran
- Coordinates: 38°23′24″N 46°21′14″E
- Country: Iran
- Province: East Azerbaijan
- County: Tabriz
- Bakhsh: Central
- Rural District: Esperan

Population (2006)
  - Total: 377
- Time zone: UTC+3:30 (IRST)
  - Summer (DST): UTC+4:30 (IRDT)

Gomanj-e Sofla (Persian: گمانج سفلي, also Romanized as Gomānj-e Soflá and Gamanj Sofla; also known as Gamān, Gomānāb Pā’īn, Gomāneh Āshāqī, Gomānj-e Pā’īn, Gomānj Pā’īn, Gomyānāb Ashāqī, Gumianāb Ashāghi, Gyumyanab-Ashagy, Kamānj, Kamānj-e Pā’īn, Kamānj-e Soflá, Komanch Pā’īn, and Komānj Pā’īn) is a village in Esperan Rural District, in the Central District of Tabriz County, East Azerbaijan Province, Iran. At the 2006 census, its population was 377, in 96 families.
