= Yengi Kandi, Tabriz =

Village in East Azerbaijan province, Iran

Yengi Kandi Persian: ينگي كندي
- Village
- Location within Iran
- Coordinates: 38°00′27″N 46°04′17″E
- Country: Iran
- Province: East Azerbaijan
- County: Tabriz
- District: Khosrowshah
- Rural District: Lahijan

Population (2016)
  - Total: 1,596
- Time zone: UTC+3:30 (IRST)

Yengi Kandi (Persian: ينگي كندي) (Note: Also romanized as Yengī Kandī; also known as Yangi Kand, Yengī Kand, Yengikend, and Yeyīn Kand) is a village in Lahijan Rural District (Note: Formerly Shurakat-e Shomali Rural District) of Khosrowshah District in Tabriz County, East Azerbaijan province, Iran.

== Demographics ==
=== Population ===
At the time of the 2006 National Census, the village's population was 1,411 in 337 households. The following census in 2011 counted 1,492 people in 397 households. The 2016 census measured the population of the village as 1,596 people in 509 households.
