= Korjan =

Village in East Azerbaijan province, Iran

Korjan Persian: كرجان
- Village
- Location within Iran
- Coordinates: 37°59′10″N 46°15′30″E
- Country: Iran
- Province: East Azerbaijan
- County: Tabriz
- District: Central
- Rural District: Sard-e Sahra

Population (2016)
  - Total: 469
- Time zone: UTC+3:30 (IRST)

Korjan (Persian: كرجان) (Note: Also romanized as Korjān) is a village in Sard-e Sahra Rural District of the Central District in Tabriz County, East Azerbaijan province, Iran.

== Demographics ==
=== Population ===
At the time of the 2006 National Census, the village's population was 602 in 141 households. The following census in 2011 counted 574 people in 159 households. The 2016 census measured the population of the village as 469 people in 154 households.
