= Alvar, Iran =

Alvar or Alwar (Persian: الوار) in Iran may refer to:

- Alvar, Khalkhal, Ardabil Province
- Alvar, Kowsar, Ardabil Province
- Alvar, East Azerbaijan
- Alvar-e Olya, East Azerbaijan Province
- Alvar-e Sofla, East Azerbaijan Province
- Alvar, Isfahan
