= Khelejan, East Azerbaijan =

Neighborhood in East Azerbaijan province, Iran

Khelejan Persian: خلجان
- Neighborhood
- Location within Iran
- Coordinates: 38°00′41″N 46°10′25″E
- Country: Iran
- Province: East Azerbaijan
- County: Tabriz
- District: Central
- City: Tabriz

Population (2011)
  - Total: 6,365
- Time zone: UTC+3:30 (IRST)

Khelejan (Persian: خلجان) (Note: Also romanized as Khelejān and Kheljān) is a neighborhood in the city of Tabriz in the Central District of Tabriz County, East Azerbaijan province, Iran. As a village, it was the capital of Sard-e Sahra Rural District until its capital was transferred to the village of Asenjan.

== Demographics ==
=== Population ===
At the time of the 2006 National Census, Khelejan's population was 6,354 in 1,679 households, when it was a village in Sard-e Sahra Rural District. The following census in 2011 counted 6,365 people in 1,892 households. Khelejan was annexed by the city of Tabriz in 2018.
