= Shadbad =

Shadbad (Persian: شادباد) may refer to:

- Shadbad-e Mashayekh
- Shadbad-e Olya
