= Qalehcheh, East Azerbaijan =

Village in East Azerbaijan province, Iran

Qalehcheh Persian: قلعه چه
- Village
- Location within Iran
- Coordinates: 38°00′59″N 46°07′35″E
- Country: Iran
- Province: East Azerbaijan
- County: Tabriz
- District: Khosrowshah
- Rural District: Lahijan

Population (2016)
  - Total: 163
- Time zone: UTC+3:30 (IRST)

Qalehcheh (Persian: قلعه چه) (Note: Also romanized as Qal‘eh Cheh and Qal‘ehcheh; also known as Ghal’eh Cheh and Kalacha) is a village in Lahijan Rural District (Note: Formerly Shurakat-e Shomali Rural District) of Khosrowshah District in Tabriz County, East Azerbaijan province, Iran.

== Demographics ==
=== Population ===
At the time of the 2006 National Census, the village's population was 186 in 55 households. The following census in 2011 counted 209 people in 66 households. The 2016 census measured the population of the village as 163 people in 60 households.
