= Zinjanab =

Village in East Azerbaijan province, Iran

Zinjanab Persian: زينجناب
- Village
- Location within Iran
- Coordinates: 37°51′32″N 46°18′55″E
- Country: Iran
- Province: East Azerbaijan
- County: Tabriz
- District: Central
- Rural District: Sard-e Sahra

Population (2016)
  - Total: 1,693
- Time zone: UTC+3:30 (IRST)

Zinjanab (Persian: زينجناب) (Note: Also romanized as Zīnjanāb; also known as Zanjenāb) is a village in Sard-e Sahra Rural District of the Central District in Tabriz County, East Azerbaijan province, Iran.

== Demographics ==
=== Population ===
At the time of the 2006 National Census, the village's population was 1,973 in 564 households. The following census in 2011 counted 1,616 people in 528 households. The 2016 census measured the population of the village as 1,693 people in 597 households.
