= Sahlan =

Sahlan Saghalan
- Village
- Location within Iran
- Coordinates: 38°10′31″N 46°07′44″E
- Country: Iran
- Province: East Azerbaijan
- County: Tabriz
- Bakhsh: Central
- Rural District: Aji Chay

Population (2016)
  - Total: 3,664
- Time zone: UTC+3:30 (IRST)
  - Summer (DST): UTC+4:30 (IRDT)

Sahlan (Saghalan) (Azerbaijani: Sağalan, ساغالان) (Persian: سهلان), and also known as Savalan) is a village in Aji Chay Rural District, in the Central District of Tabriz County, East Azerbaijan Province, Iran. At the 2016 census, its population was 3,664.

The ancient city of Gilikhan is located near Saghalan.

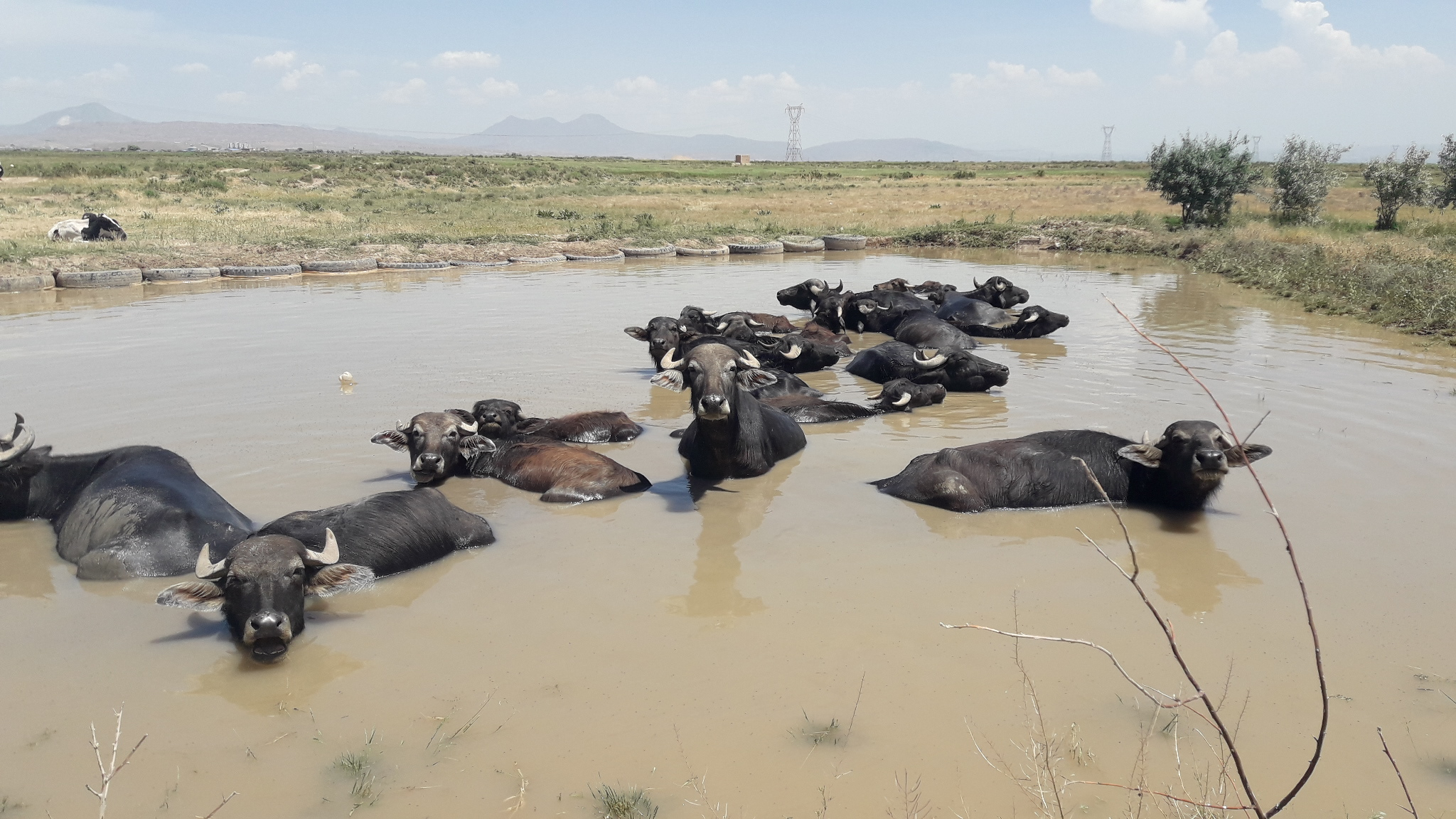

Water buffalos in Saghalan
