= Nirugah-e Hararati =

Village and thermal power station in East Azerbaijan province, Iran

Nirugah-e Hararati Persian: نيروگاه حرارتي
- Village and Thermal Power Station
- Location within Iran
- Coordinates: 38°00′02″N 46°05′45″E
- Country: Iran
- Province: East Azerbaijan
- County: Tabriz
- District: Khosrowshah
- Rural District: Lahijan

Population (2016)
  - Total: 361
- Time zone: UTC+3:30 (IRST)

Nirugah-e Hararati (Persian: نيروگاه حرارتي) (Note: Also romanized as Nīrūgāh-e Ḩarāratī; also known as Nīrūgāh-e Ḩarāratī-ye Tabrīz; English: Thermal Power Station) is a village and thermal power station in Lahijan Rural District (Note: Formerly Shurakat-e Shomali Rural District) of Khosrowshah District in Tabriz County, East Azerbaijan province, Iran.

== Demographics ==
=== Population ===
At the time of the 2006 National Census, the village's population was 658 in 183 households. The following census in 2011 counted 524 people in 162 households. The 2016 census measured the population of the village as 361 people in 114 households.
