= Esperan =

Esperan may refer to:

- Esperantido, created by Matthias Liszt in 2003
- Esperan Rural District, in Iran
  - Dash Esperan, village in Esperan Rural District
  - Yengi Esperan, village in Esperan Rural District
