= Gomanj =

Gomanj and Gamanj (Persian: گمانج), also rendered as Komanj or Komanch or Kamanj may refer to:

- Gomanj-e Olya
- Gomanj-e Sofla
