= Arpa Darrehsi, Tabriz =

Village in East Azerbaijan province, Iran

Arpa Darrehsi Persian: آرپا دره‌سی
- Village
- Location within Iran
- Coordinates: 38°05′23″N 46°25′22″E
- Country: Iran
- Province: East Azerbaijan
- County: Tabriz
- District: Basmenj
- Rural District: Meydan Chay

Population (2016)
  - Total: 1,033
- Time zone: UTC+3:30 (IRST)

Arpa Darrehsi (Persian: آرپا دره‌سی) (Note: Also romanized as Ārpā Darehsī and Ārpā Darrehsī; also known as Ārpā Darasī, Ārpā Darast, Ārpā Darreh, Ārpā Darst, Ārpādarrasi, Arpadar’ya, and Ārpeh Darreh) is a village in Meydan Chay Rural District of Basmenj District in Tabriz County, East Azerbaijan province, Iran.

== Demographics ==
=== Population ===
At the time of the 2006 National Census, the village's population was 793 in 220 households, when it was in the Central District. The following census in 2011 counted 757 people in 225 households. The 2016 census measured the population of the village as 1,033 people in 322 households.

In 2021, the rural district was separated from the district in the formation of Basmenj District.
