= Shadbad-e Mashayekh =

Village in East Azerbaijan province, Iran

Shadbad-e Mashayekh Persian: شادبادمشايخ
- Village
- Location within Iran
- Coordinates: 37°59′24″N 46°21′27″E
- Country: Iran
- Province: East Azerbaijan
- County: Tabriz
- District: Central
- Rural District: Sard-e Sahra

Population (2016)
  - Total: 5,524
- Time zone: UTC+3:30 (IRST)

Shadbad-e Mashayekh (Persian: شادبادمشايخ) (Note: Also romanized as Shādbād-e Mashāyekh; also known as Panbeh Shalvār, Pina Shalvar, Pīneh Shalvār, Shādābād-e Mashāyekh, and Shāh Ābād-e-Mashāyekh) is a village in Sard-e Sahra Rural District of the Central District in Tabriz County, East Azerbaijan province, Iran.

== Demographics ==
=== Population ===
At the time of the 2006 National Census, the village's population was 4,317 in 1,086 households, when it was in Meydan Chay Rural District. The following census in 2011 counted 4,474 people in 1,351 households. The 2016 census measured the population of the village as 5,524 people in 1,765 households.

Shadbad-e Mashayekh was transferred to Sard-e Sahra Rural District in 2021.
