= Tazeh Kand, Tabriz =

Village in East Azerbaijan province, Iran

Tazeh Kand Persian: تازه كند
- Village
- Location within Iran
- Coordinates: 37°58′45″N 46°00′13″E
- Country: Iran
- Province: East Azerbaijan
- County: Tabriz
- District: Khosrowshah
- Rural District: Tazeh Kand

Population (2016)
  - Total: 1,980
- Time zone: UTC+3:30 (IRST)

Tazeh Kand (Persian: تازه كند) (Note: Also romanized as Tāzeh Kand) is a village in, and the capital of, Tazeh Kand Rural District in Khosrowshah District of Tabriz County, East Azerbaijan province, Iran.

== Demographics ==
=== Population ===
At the time of the 2006 National Census, the village's population was 1,778 in 465 households. The following census in 2011 counted 1,873 people in 602 households. The 2016 census measured the population of the village as 1,980 people in 638 households.
