= Aq Dash, East Azerbaijan =

Aq Dash اقداش
- Village
- Location within Iran
- Coordinates: 38°17′41″N 46°25′37″E
- Country: Iran
- Province: East Azerbaijan
- County: Tabriz
- Bakhsh: Central
- Rural District: Esperan

Population (2006)
  - Total: 117
- Time zone: UTC+3:30 (IRST)
  - Summer (DST): UTC+4:30 (IRDT)

Aq Dash (Persian: اقداش, also Romanized as Āq Dāsh; also known as Agdash and Āghdāsh) is a village in Esperan Rural District, in the Central District of Tabriz County, East Azerbaijan Province, Iran. At the 2006 census, its population was 117, in 33 families.
