= Guy Bolagh-e Pain =

Guy Bolagh-e Pain گوي بلاغ پائين
- Village
- Location within Iran
- Coordinates: 38°27′56″N 46°24′27″E
- Country: Iran
- Province: East Azerbaijan
- County: Tabriz
- Bakhsh: Central
- Rural District: Esperan

Population (2006)
  - Total: 83
- Time zone: UTC+3:30 (IRST)
  - Summer (DST): UTC+4:30 (IRDT)

Guy Bolagh-e Pain (Persian: گوي بلاغ پائين, also Romanized as Gūy Bolāgh-e Pā’īn; also known as Gūy Bolāgh-e Bālā, Kūy Bolāgh-e Pā’īn, Shāh Bolāgh, Shāh Bolāgh-e Pā’īn, Shāhbolāghī Pā’īn, Shāh Bolāghī-ye Pā’īn, Shāh Bolāgh Pā’īn, Shah Bolagh Sofla, and Shakh-Bulag-ashagy) is a village in Esperan Rural District, in the Central District of Tabriz County, East Azerbaijan Province, Iran. At the 2006 census, its population was 83, in 20 families.
