= Alwa =

Alwa may refer to:

== Places ==
- al-Alwa, a village in southern Al-Hasakah Governorate, northeastern Syria
- Alodia, a kingdom of Christian Nubia, south of Nobatia and Makuria
- Alwa Mehwa, a village and former Mehwal (petty princely state) in Gujarat, western India

== Music ==
- Alwa (folk music group), Swedish folk group

== Fictional characters in ==
- Lulu (opera)
- Pandora's Box (play)
- Pandora's Box (1929 film)

== Acronym ==
- Albanian League of Writers and Artists (Albanian: Lidhja e Shkrimtarëve dhe e Artistëve)

== See also ==
- Alvar (disambiguation)
