= Suñol =

Suñol is a Spanish surname. Notable people with the name include:

- Cèlia Suñol i Pla (1899–1986), Catalan writer
- Alvar Suñol (born 1935), Spanish painter, sculptor and lithographer
- Antonio Suñol, Spanish-born Californio businessman, ranchero, and politician
- Jeronimo Suñol (1839–1902), Spanish sculptor born in Barcelona

== See also ==
- Sunol (disambiguation) – geographical locations
