= Yengi Esperan =

Village in East Azerbaijan province, Iran

Yengi Esperan Persian: ينگي اسپیران
- Village
- Location within Iran
- Coordinates: 38°16′52″N 46°20′21″E
- Country: Iran
- Province: East Azerbaijan
- County: Tabriz
- District: Central
- Rural District: Esperan

Population (2016)
  - Total: 3,515
- Time zone: UTC+3:30 (IRST)

Yengi Esperan (Persian: ينگي اسپیران) (Note: Also romanized as Yengī Asperān and Yengī Esparān; also known as Angilspirān, Isbiran, Safīdān-e Jadīd (سفيدان جديد), Sefīdān Jadīd, Sefīdān Jadīd-e, Yengī Esberān, Yengi Esīrān, and Yengi-Isperan) is a village in, and the capital of, Esperan Rural District in the Central District of Tabriz County, East Azerbaijan province, Iran.

== Demographics ==
=== Population ===
At the time of the 2006 National Census, the village's population was 3,012 in 735 households. The following census in 2011 counted 3,294 people in 892 households. The 2016 census measured the population of the village as 3,515 people in 1,092 households.
