= Ughli =

Village in East Azerbaijan province, Iran

Ughli Persian: اوغلی
- Village
- Location within Iran
- Coordinates: 38°10′27″N 46°13′18″E
- Country: Iran
- Province: East Azerbaijan
- County: Tabriz
- District: Central
- Rural District: Aji Chay

Population (2016)
  - Total: 2,651
- Time zone: UTC+3:30 (IRST)

Ughli (Persian: اوغلی) (Note: Also romanized as Ūghlī; also known as Eroqlī, Evlī, Oghlū, Ovli, and Ovly) is a village in Aji Chay Rural District of the Central District in Tabriz County, East Azerbaijan province, Iran.

== Demographics ==
=== Population ===
At the time of the 2006 National Census, the village's population was 738 in 199 households. The following census in 2011 counted 1,576 people in 421 households. The 2016 census measured the population of the village as 2,651 people in 805 households.
