= Gomanj-e Olya =

Village in East Azerbaijan province, Iran

Gomanj-e Olya Persian: گمانج عليا
- Village
- Location within Iran
- Coordinates: 38°25′16″N 46°23′35″E
- Country: Iran
- Province: East Azerbaijan
- County: Tabriz
- District: Central
- Rural District: Esperan

Population (2016)
  - Total: 225
- Time zone: UTC+3:30 (IRST)

Gomanj-e Olya (Persian: گمانج عليا) (Note: Also romanized as Gamanj Olya and Gomānj-e ‘Olyā; also known as Gomānab, Gomānj Bālā, Gomānj-e Bālā, Gomyānāb, Gumianāb, Gyumyanab, Kamanj-e Bālā, Kamānj-e ‘Olyā, Komānch Bālā, Komānj Bālā, and Kūmīnyāb) is a village in Esperan Rural District of the Central District in Tabriz County, East Azerbaijan province, Iran.

== Demographics ==
=== Population ===
At the time of the 2006 National Census, the village's population was 314 in 86 households. The following census in 2011 counted 232 people in 70 households. The 2016 census measured the population of the village as 225 people in 77 households.
