= Khavaran =

Khavaran may refer to:

- Khavaran, Fars, a city in Fars province, Iran
- Khavaran, Tehran, a neighborhood in Tehran, Iran
  - Khavavran cemetery, a cemetery that is located in the neighborhood.
- Khavaran, Tabriz, a town in Tabriz, Iran
- Khavaran District, Ray County, Tehran province
- Khavaran-e Gharbi Rural District, Ray County, Tehran province
- Khavaran-e Sharqi Rural District, Ray County, Tehran province
- Mothers of Khavaran
