= Mayan-e Sofla, East Azerbaijan =

Village in East Azerbaijan province, Iran

Mayan-e Sofla Persian: مايان سفلی
- Village
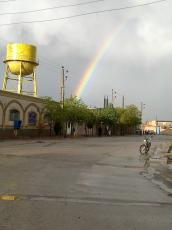
- View from Mayan-e Sofla

- Location within Iran
- Coordinates: 38°04′56″N 46°06′22″E
- Country: Iran
- Province: East Azerbaijan
- County: Tabriz
- District: Central
- Rural District: Aji Chay

Area
  - Total: 4 km^{2} (1.5 sq mi)

Population (2016)
  - Total: 6,596
  - Density: 1,600/km^{2} (4,300/sq mi)
- Time zone: UTC+3:30 (IRST)
- Area code: +9841
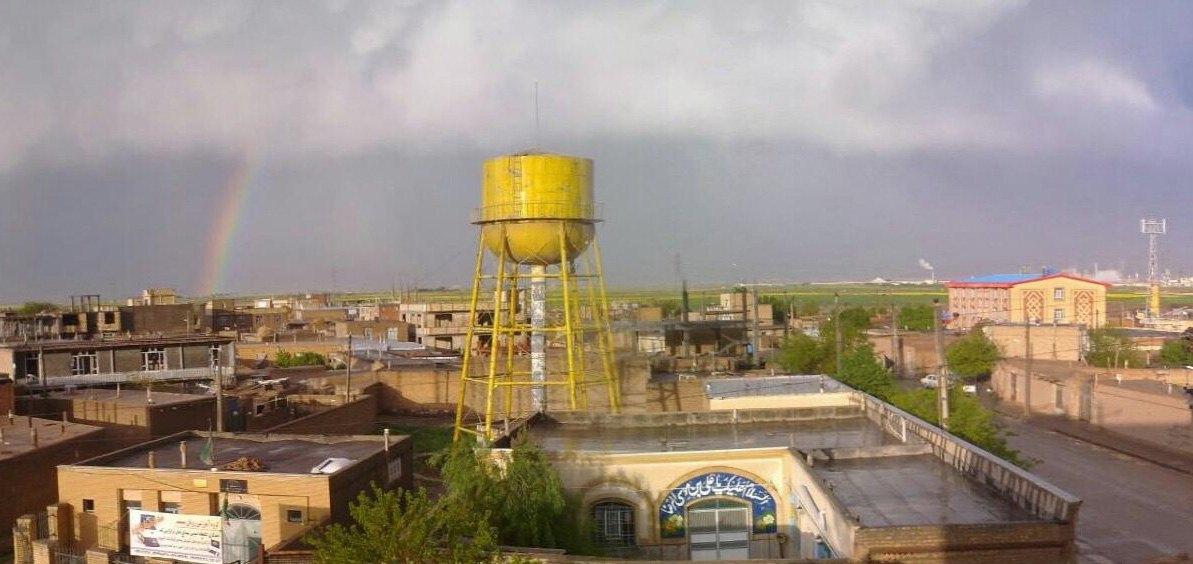
- Mayan-e Sofla (مایان سفلی): Mayan-e Sofla on Google Maps

Mayan-e Sofla (Persian: مايان سفلی) (Note: Also romanized as Māyān-e Soflá; also known as Ashaghi Mayan, Buyuk Mayān, Eshāgī Māyān, Maiané Sofla, Māyān, Māyān Pā’īn, and Māyān-e Pa‘īn) is a village in, and the capital of, Aji Chay Rural District in the Central District of Tabriz County, East Azerbaijan province, Iran.

== Demographics ==
=== Population ===
At the time of the 2006 National Census, the village's population was 6,399 in 1,236 households. The following census in 2011 counted 7,083 people in 1,694 households. The 2016 census measured the population of the village as 6,596 people in 1,965 households.

== Related links ==
- Mayan-e Sofla in the Persian Wikipedia
- Mayan-e Sofla on the Google Maps
