= Esfahlan =

City in East Azerbaijan province, Iran

Esfahlan Persian: اسفهلان
- City
- Location within Iran
- Coordinates: 37°59′31″N 46°06′36″E
- Country: Iran
- Province: East Azerbaijan
- County: Tabriz
- District: Khosrowshah
- Established: 2023

Population (2016)
  - Total: 4,939
- Time zone: UTC+3:30 (IRST)

Esfahlan (Persian: اسفهلان) (Note: Also romanized as Esfahlān) is a city in Khosrowshah District of Tabriz County, East Azerbaijan province, Iran.

== Demographics ==
=== Population ===
At the time of the 2006 National Census, Esfahlan's population was 4,102 in 1,124 households, when it was a village in Lahijan Rural District. (Note: Formerly Shurakat-e Shomali Rural District) The following census in 2011 counted 4,414 people in 1,355 households. The 2016 census measured the population of the village as 4,939 people in 1,587 households.

Esfahlan was converted to a city in 2023.
