= Bareh =

Bareh (Persian: باره) may refer to:

- Bareh, Marand, East Azerbaijan Province
- Bareh, Tabriz, East Azerbaijan Province
- Bareh, West Azerbaijan
