= Satlu =

Satlu or Satloo (Persian: ساتلو or ساعتلو) may refer to:

- Satlu, East Azerbaijan (ساتلو - Saţlū)
- Satlu, Hormozgan (ساتلو - Saţlū)
- Satlu, West Azerbaijan (ساعتلو - Sāʿtlū)
- Satlu (ساعتلو - Sāʿtlū), alternate name of Saatluy Kuh, West Azerbaijan Province
