= Akhuleh =

Village in East Azerbaijan province, Iran

Akhuleh Persian: اخوله
- Village
- Location within Iran
- Coordinates: 38°00′53″N 46°02′31″E
- Country: Iran
- Province: East Azerbaijan
- County: Tabriz
- District: Khosrowshah
- Rural District: Tazeh Kand

Population (2016)
  - Total: 2,826
- Time zone: UTC+3:30 (IRST)

Akhuleh (Persian: اخوله) (Note: Also romanized as Ākhūleh; also known as Ākholā, Ākhūlā, and Akhulu) is a village in Tazeh Kand Rural District of Khosrowshah District in Tabriz County, East Azerbaijan province, Iran.

== Demographics ==
=== Population ===
At the time of the 2006 National Census, the village's population was 2,351 in 441 households. The following census in 2011 counted 2,680 people in 800 households. The 2016 census measured the population of the village as 2,826 people in 874 households. It was the most populous village in its rural district.
