= Satellu =

Village in East Azerbaijan province, Iran

Satellu Persian: ساتللو
- Village
- Location within Iran
- Coordinates: 37°59′42″N 45°57′28″E
- Country: Iran
- Province: East Azerbaijan
- County: Tabriz
- District: Khosrowshah
- Rural District: Tazeh Kand

Population (2016)
  - Total: 1,470
- Time zone: UTC+3:30 (IRST)

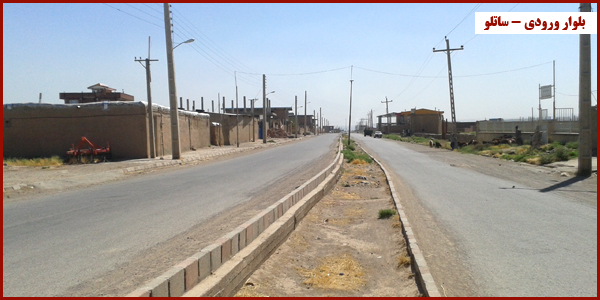
Road through Satellu village, East Azerbaijan province, Iran.

Satellu (Persian: ساتللو) (Note: Also romanized as Sātellū and Sāţellū; also known as Salţū, Satil, Sātloo, Sātlū, and Satyn) is a village in Tazeh Kand Rural District of Khosrowshah District in Tabriz County, East Azerbaijan province, Iran.

== Demographics ==
=== Population ===
At the time of the 2006 National Census, the village's population was 1,365 in 247 households. The following census in 2011 counted 1,452 people in 372 households. The 2016 census measured the population of the village as 1,470 people in 410 households.
