= Uli, Iran =

Village in East Azerbaijan province, Iran

Uli Persian: اولي
- Village
- Location within Iran
- Coordinates: 38°19′52″N 46°18′03″E
- Country: Iran
- Province: East Azerbaijan
- County: Tabriz
- District: Central
- Rural District: Esperan

Population (2016)
  - Total: 695
- Time zone: UTC+3:30 (IRST)

Uli (Persian: اولي) (Note: Also romanized as Evlī and Uli; also known as Owlá and Owlá Kandī) is a village in Esperan Rural District of the Central District in Tabriz County, East Azerbaijan province, Iran.

== Demographics ==
=== Population ===
At the time of the 2006 National Census, the village's population was 778 in 197 households. The following census in 2011 counted 700 people in 207 households. The 2016 census measured the population of the village as 695 people in 220 households.
