= Mayan-e Sofla =

Mayan-e Sofla (Persian: مايان سفلي), also known as Mayan-e Pain and Mayan Pain, may refer to:

- Mayan-e Sofla, East Azerbaijan
- Mayan-e Sofla, Razavi Khorasan
