= Alvar-e Olya =

Neighborhood in East Azerbaijan province, Iran

Alvar-e Olya Persian: الوارعليا
- Neighborhood
- Location within Iran
- Coordinates: 38°09′04″N 46°10′35″E
- Country: Iran
- Province: East Azerbaijan
- County: Tabriz
- District: Central
- City: Tabriz

Population (2016)
  - Total: 1,761
- Time zone: UTC+3:30 (IRST)

Alvar-e Olya (Persian: الوارعليا) (Note: Also romanized as Alvār-e ‘Olyā; also known as Alvār, Alvār Yūkhārī, Alvār-e Bālā, Malyy Al’var, and Yūkhārī Alvār) is a neighborhood in the city of Tabriz in the Central District of Tabriz County, East Azerbaijan province, Iran.

== Demographics ==
=== Population ===
At the time of the 2006 National Census, Ana Khatun's population was 1,309 in 357 households, when it was a village in Aji Chay Rural District. The following census in 2011 counted 1,142 people in 331 households. The 2016 census measured the population of the village as 1,761 people in 480 households. Ana Khatun was annexed by the city of Tabriz in 2018.
