= Sefidan-e Atiq =

Village in East Azerbaijan province, Iran

Sefidan-e Atiq Persian: سفيدان عتيق
- Village
- Location within Iran
- Coordinates: 38°14′48″N 46°22′40″E
- Country: Iran
- Province: East Azerbaijan
- County: Tabriz
- District: Central
- Rural District: Esperan

Population (2016)
  - Total: 268
- Time zone: UTC+3:30 (IRST)

Sefidan-e Atiq (Persian: سفيدان عتيق) (Note: Also romanized as Sefīdān-e ‘Atīq and Safīdān-Atiq; also known as Dāsh Esparān (داش اسپران), Dash Esperan, Dash-Isperan, Dāsh Ispirān, and Sefidané Atigh) is a village in Esperan Rural District of the Central District in Tabriz County, East Azerbaijan province, Iran.

== Demographics ==
=== Population ===
At the time of the 2006 National Census, the village's population was 251 in 51 households. The following census in 2011 counted 240 people in 62 households. The 2016 census measured the population of the village as 268 people in 72 households.
