= Alvar-e Sofla =

Village in East Azerbaijan province, Iran

Alvar-e Sofla Persian: الوارسفلي
- Village
- Location within Iran
- Coordinates: 38°08′32″N 46°08′41″E
- Country: Iran
- Province: East Azerbaijan
- County: Tabriz
- District: Central
- Rural District: Aji Chay

Population (2016)
  - Total: 6,916
- Time zone: UTC+3:30 (IRST)

Alvar-e Sofla (Persian: الوارسفلي) (Note: Also romanized as Alvār Soflá, Alvār-e Soflá, and Alvar-e Soflá; also known as Alvār, Alvār Ashāqī, Alvār Bozorg, Alvār Pā’īn, Alvār-e Pā’īn, and Bol’shoy Al’var) is a village in Aji Chay Rural District of the Central District in Tabriz County, East Azerbaijan province, Iran.

== Demographics ==
=== Population ===
At the time of the 2006 National Census, the village's population was 3,567 in 846 households. The following census in 2011 counted 5,946 people in 1,696 households. The 2016 census measured the population of the village as 6,916 people in 2,066 households.
