= Lahijan Rural District =

Lahijan Rural District (Persian: دهستان لاهيجان) may refer to:

- Lahijan Rural District (Tabriz County), East Azerbaijan province
- Lahijan Rural District (Piranshahr County), West Azerbaijan province

== See also ==
- Lahijan-e Gharbi Rural District, Piranshahr County, West Azerbaijan province
- Lahijan-e Sharqi Rural District, Piranshahr County, West Azerbaijan province
