= Khavaran, Tabriz =

Residential borough in Tabriz, Iran

Khavaran is an under-construction residential borough situated in the city of Tabriz and in the jurisdiction of the District 9 Submunicipality. The borough will be considered the most modern Iranian residential borough.

== Beginning of construction ==
About twenty years after acquiring the lands of the Khavaran borough, construction of the borough began officially on December 6, 2010.

Mass constructors of the chamber of commerce of Antalya Province, Turkey have also announced their willingness to invest in the borough.

== Features ==
The predicted population for habitation in the Khavaran borough is 160 thousand people and its area is announced 820 hectares. The construction pattern of the Khavaran borough is different from the general texture of the city of Tabriz; and the residential units will be founded in sizes bigger than 320 meters as villas. The Tehran-Tabriz Freeway will also pass beside the borough.

For the first time in Iran, a common tunnel will be founded for the uses of the water supply, electricity, gas and telecommunication companies in the Khavaran borough.

While the number of the floors is determined by the width of passage, parking supply and open space in the city of Tabriz, the number of the floors of a building is determined by the areas of the sectors in the Khavaran borough. Meanwhile, there is no passage shorter than 12 meters in the borough.

With an area of 820 hectares, the borough connects to the Basmenj road in the north, the Tabriz-Tehran Highway in the south, the Zarnaq road in the east and the Kasayi and Payambar-e Aazam Freeways in the west. The Khavaran borough consists of 350 hectares the Khavaran borough itself, 320 hectares of Azaran and 120 hectares the white spot (the Fathabad lands); and the village of Fathabad itself is situated inside the borough and is part of the Municipal District 9 domain.

== Ongoing projects ==
- In May 2011, the District 9 Municipality of Tabriz established a green belt with an area of approximately 10 hectares in the perimeter of the Khavaran borough.
- On June 25, 2011, the executive operation of the first water mosque in the world and the most equipped water park in Iran commenced. The design of the water mosque is founded with 90 percent water in different parts like the facade, columns, minarets, dome, walls, stairs and its other architectural parts in a space with the area of 124 thousand square meters with signs and symbols of Paradise and Islam. The water park, which is founded as the first phase of the largest welfare, recreation and service complex in the Khavaran borough, is constructed in a space with the area of 14 thousand square meters.
- The tallest Iranian tower is founded by one of the foreign direct investment companies in 65 floors, 190 meters height and a base of 59000 square meters with commercial, hotel, service, amusement park and parking applications in the Khavaran borough. The estimated foundation price of the skyscraper is 23 thousand and 520 billion rials; and the share of the Tabriz Municipality (the land and the construction license) will be seven thousand and 824 billion rials, and the investment part 15 thousand and 685 billion rials.
- The Gostaresh Foulad Football Club intends to found a forty thousand-man stadium in the district, and has provided all the arrangements. The map of the stadium is produced in a form that resembles a lot to European stadiums and will be founded with the most advanced tools.
- In addition, the Shahrdari Tabriz F.C. will make some training fields for holding exhibition games and the trainings of the team in the borough.
- By signing an accord for cooperative investment in the Health Village Project of Tabriz Municipality, a special facility for providing medical and therapeutic services will be created with an area of 10 hectares in the Khavaran region. By creating the Health Village of Tabriz Municipality and transfer of the medical and therapeutic units of the city to developing regions, the traffic of medical and therapeutic resorts will be reduced in the central spots of the city; and the quantity and quality of the medical services will also be enhanced. The special therapeutic clinics, the center of health care symposiums, geriatric center, the centers of supplying medical and hygienic gear and equipment and special medical departments, besides service and welfare centers, are some of the predicted details for launching the Health Village of Tabriz Municipality.
- A subspecialized hospital for childhood cancer.
- Founding a water park with an area of 4 hectares with an investment higher than 3000 billion rials by the private sector.
- A social security hospital with a budget higher than 5 thousand billion rials.
- The Khavaran cultural-sport facility with a base larger than 7000 square meters consisting of a Farhangsara, a multi-purpose sports arena with an area of 2000 square meters, a swimming pool with a capacity of 200 people and a bodybuilding facility.
- The Khavaran educational-service facility with a base 8000 meters wide consisting of the Khavaran symposium house with a capacity of 1500 people, two cinematic rooms with capacities of 50 people, houses for holding educational classes and a service house with an area of 1000 square meters.
- The project of founding the largest Iranian hypermarket with contributions by the French company Carrefour and a Turkish company in a land with an area of 14 hectares.
