= Tazeh Kand Rural District =

Tazeh Kand Rural District (Persian: دهستان تازه كند) may refer to:

- Tazeh Kand Rural District (Parsabad County), Ardabil province
- Tazeh Kand Rural District (Tabriz County), East Azerbaijan province
