= The House Is Black =

Iranian short documentary film (1963)

The House Is Black (Khaneh siyah ast)
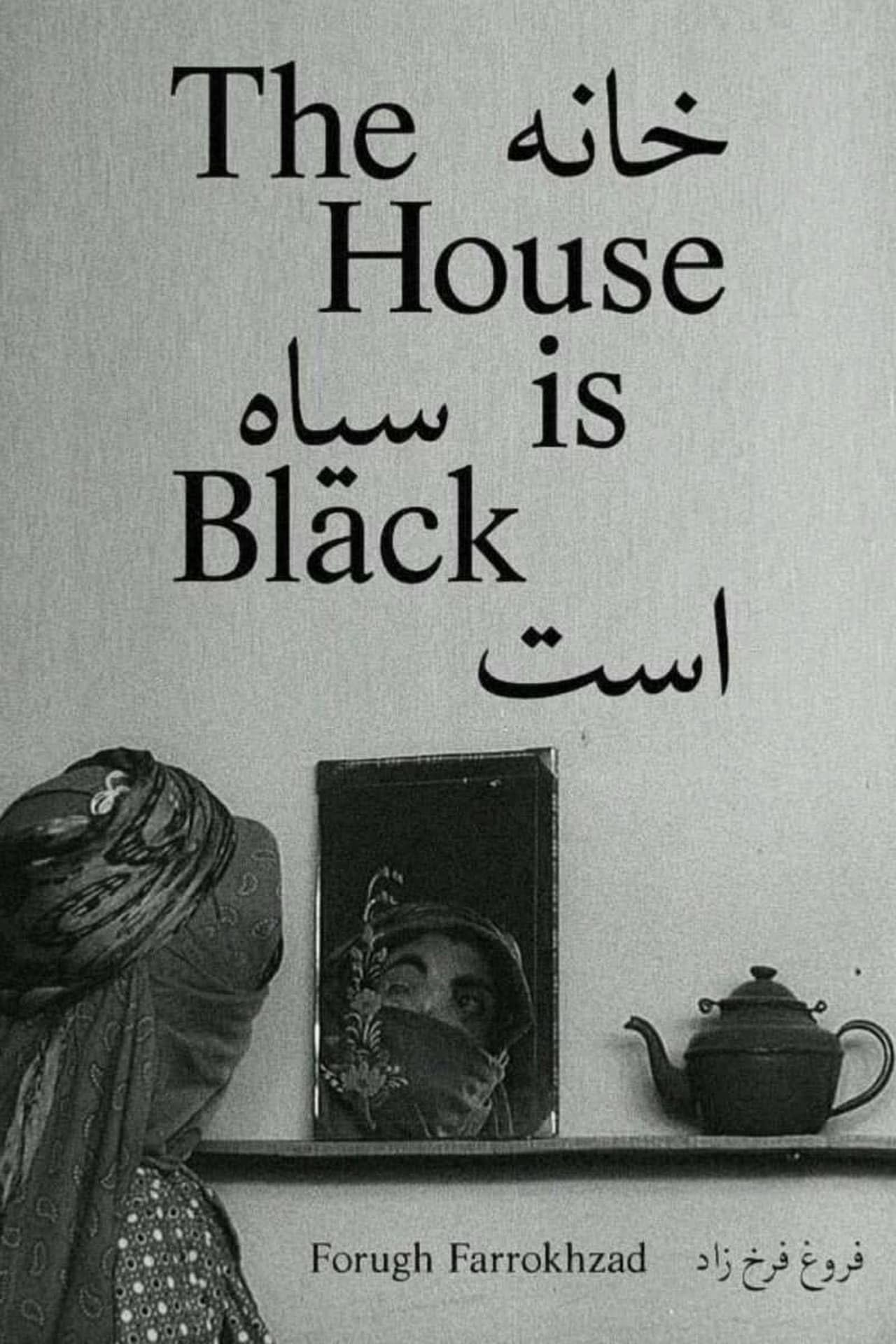
- Official poster
- خانه سیاه است
- Directed by: Forugh Farrokhzad
- Written by: Forugh Farrokhzad
- Produced by: Ebrahim Golestan
- Release date: 1963
- Running time: 22 minutes
- Country: Iran
- Language: Persian

The House Is Black (Persian: خانه سیاه است) is an acclaimed Iranian documentary short film directed by Forugh Farrokhzad.

The House Is Black, with English subtitles

The film is a look at life and suffering in a leper colony and focuses on the human condition and the beauty of creation. It is spliced with Farrokhzad's narration of quotes from the Old Testament, the Qur'an and her own poetry. The film features footage from the Bababaghi Hospice leper colony. It was the only film she directed before her death in 1967. After shooting this film she adopted a child from the colony, her son Hossein.

In 2019, a restored print of the film was debuted at the Venice International Film Festival.

== Production ==
After a stay in Europe in 1958, Forugh Farrokhzad, most well-known as a poet, returned to Iran and met and began a relationship with filmmaker Ebrahim Golestan. She worked at his film studio, where she gained an opportunity to work as an editor on his documentaries A Fire and Water and Heat, before then directing The House is Black in collaboration with a leprosy charity.

== Reception ==
On the review aggregator site Rotten Tomatoes, The House is Black has a 100% approval rating based on 7 reviews.

Although the film attracted little attention outside Iran when released, it has since been recognized as a landmark in Iranian film. Reviewer Eric Henderson described the film as "[o]ne of the prototypal essay films, The House Is Black paved the way for the Iranian New Wave." In 1963, the film was awarded the grand prize for the category documentary at the International Short Film Festival Oberhausen in West Germany. Writing for Off Screen in 2014, Roxanne Varzi noted the influence of the Italian neorealist movement on the film. A 2020 piece for The Guardian compared the isolation depicted in the film to that of the COVID-19 pandemic.

In 2024, director Jonathan Glazer chose to discuss the film on an appearance on the radio show The Treatment on KCRW, describing the film as "so coruscating, so humanist, so political that really, I can't urge you enough to see it".

In the 2022 Sight and Sound critic's poll of the greatest films of all time, The House is Black was tied for 101st place with Rio Bravo and Vagabond.

== Notes ==
- Hamid Dabashi, Masters & Masterpieces of Iranian Cinema, 451 p. (Mage Publishers, Washington, DC, 2007); Chapter II, pp. 39–70: Forough Farrokhzad; The House Is Black. ISBN 0-934211-85-X
