= Aji Chay Rural District =

Rural district in East Azerbaijan province, Iran

Aji Chay Rural District Persian: دهستان آجی چای
- Rural District
- Location within Iran
- Coordinates: 38°06′N 46°04′E
- Country: Iran
- Province: East Azerbaijan
- County: Tabriz
- District: Central
- Established: 1987
- Capital: Mayan-e Sofla

Population (2016)
  - Total: 46,054
- Time zone: UTC+3:30 (IRST)

Aji Chay Rural District (Persian: دهستان آجی چای) is in the Central District of Tabriz County, East Azerbaijan province, Iran. Its capital is the village of Mayan-e Sofla.

== Demographics ==
=== Population ===
At the time of the 2006 National Census, the rural district's population was 33,818 in 7,942 households. There were 42,460 inhabitants in 11,642 households at the following census of 2011. The 2016 census measured the population of the rural district as 46,054 in 13,752 households. The most populous of its 12 villages was Bagh-e Maruf, with 12,068 people.

=== Other villages in the rural district ===
- Alvar-e Sofla
- Khvajeh Dizaj
- Mayan-e Olya
- Qezel Dizaj
- Sahlan
- Ughli

== See also ==
Alvar-e Olya and Kujuvar, former villages and now neighborhoods of Tabriz
