= Shahr-e Jadid-e Shahriar =

City in East Azerbaijan province, Iran

Shahr-e Jadid-e Shahriar Persian: شهر جدید شهریار
- City
- Location within Iran
- Coordinates: 38°03′50″N 46°29′43″E
- Country: Iran
- Province: East Azerbaijan
- County: Tabriz
- District: Basmenj
- Established: 2015
- Time zone: UTC+3:30 (IRST)

Shahr-e Jadid-e Shahriar (Persian: شهر جدید شهریار) (Note: Also known as Shahriar, also romanized as Shahriyar, Shahriyār, and Shahryar) is a city in Basmenj District of Tabriz County, East Azerbaijan province, Iran.

A new city under construction because of the large population of the metropolis of Tabriz, new apartments and villa homes will be built. Shahriar is located on the Tabriz-Ahar road. The predicted population is 170,000 on its area of 1,500 hectares.
