= Sardrud =

City in East Azerbaijan province, Iran

Sardrud Persian: سردرود
- City
- Location within Iran
- Coordinates: 38°01′36″N 46°09′10″E
- Country: Iran
- Province: East Azerbaijan
- County: Tabriz
- District: Central

Population (2016)
  - Total: 29,739
- Time zone: UTC+3:30 (IRST)

Sardrud (Persian: سردرود) (Note: Also romanized as Sard Rood, Sardrūd, and Sardārūd; also known as Sardari) is a city in the Central District of Tabriz County, East Azerbaijan province, Iran.

== Demographics ==
=== Population ===
At the time of the 2006 National Census, the city's population was 24,858 in 6,903 households. The following census in 2011 counted 26,856 people in 8,076 households. The 2016 census measured the population of the city as 29,739 people in 9,529 households.

== Economy ==
Due to the location of Shahid Rajaei industrial town, refineries, petrochemicals, tractors, machinery, Idem and other similar industrial facilities in the vicinity of the city, many small and large industries and workshops operate in this city.

=== Agriculture ===
The agricultural products of this city include fruits such green tomatoes, grapes, apricots, walnuts, apples, peaches and pears.

=== Carpets ===
Sardrood, with its long history and the expansive production of this art: has been known as the carpet capital of Iran and the world across multiple societies throughout its history.

Sardrood handmade carpets are of great value and acceptance worldwide due to the abundance of colors and elegance used in them. These carpets are often woven in the form of portraits, art designs, paintings, landscapes and verses of the Qur'an are other common designs used in these carpets. The art of weaving carpets in the city of Sardrood is 80 years old, so that 80% of the people of this city earn money directly or indirectly from this art. Carpets are nationally registered in the list of spiritual works of the country's cultural heritage. The first and only union of carpet weavers in the country was established in 1990 in this city.

Due to the side jobs of this class and the scope of activity of the carpet manufacturers in this city, the unemployment rate in this city is close to zero and it has created 260,000 jobs in 18 provinces of the country.

More than 500 pieces of carpets in different designs and sizes are produced daily under the management of centralized and decentralized workshops.

== Antiquities ==
The ancient castle "Narin Qaleh" or the old Sardrood is the most important and at the same time the most valuable historical monument of Sardrood. This historical monument with the letters "Narin Castle", "Salasel Castle", "Salsael Castle" and "Sardor Castle" belongs to the first millennium BC and the period of the kings of Urartu, Sardor II, son of Argishti I (733-753 BC) have been. The fort had a security-protection function and was built to protect Tabriz at the time it was called "Tarmakis". This castle is located on top of a low hill on the slopes of Sahand and it has dimensions of about 700 meters by 500 meters.

In the central part, a large number of rubble is scattered, which is probably related to one of the Urartu facilities, which may have collapsed and been destroyed by an earthquake or other disasters. Considering the numerous pottery scattered on the surface of the castle and towers and fortifications and stratified walls with a diameter of 2 meters and a height of more than 6 meters, it can be guessed that the castle has been reused after destruction due to its privileged position in the Islamic era.

Existence of gray pottery from the late second and early first centuries BC and plain cream and pea pottery belonging to the Parthian period, as well as glazed pottery with Islamic motifs, especially in the 7th and 8th centuries AH, confirm the existence of civilization and human life in There have been different periods in this castle. Historical documents show that the continuation of social life existed before the terrible earthquake of 1193 AH and the castle was the same as today.

== Tourism and recreational attractions ==
The main entertainment and tourism center of this city is Marah Khoni Forest Park, which is located in a part of the traditional gardens of this city.

Due to the proximity to the metropolis of Tabriz, restaurants have emerged in this area.
