= Khosrowshah =

City in East Azerbaijan province, Iran

Khosrowshah Persian: خسروشاه
- City
- Location within Iran
- Coordinates: 37°57′05″N 46°03′03″E
- Country: Iran
- Province: East Azerbaijan
- County: Tabriz
- District: Khosrowshah

Population (2016)
  - Total: 21,972
- Time zone: UTC+3:30 (IRST)

Khosrowshah (Persian: خسروشاه) (Note: Also known as Khosrowshahr, Khusraushāh, and Khusroshāh) is a city in, and the capital of, Khosrowshah District in Tabriz County, East Azerbaijan province, Iran.

== Etymology ==
The city's name is derived from Khusrau Shah, king of the Justanids during the 10th century. The words "Khosrow" and "Shah" are both Persian words that mean "king."

== Demographics ==
=== Population ===
At the time of the 2006 National Census, the city's population was 12,794 in 3,619 households. The following census in 2011 counted 12,447 people in 3,789 households. The 2016 census measured the population of the city as 21,972 people in 6,870 households.
