= Sunol =

Sunol may refer to:

- Sunol, California
- Sunol-Midtown, California
- Sunol, Nebraska
- Sunol Regional Wilderness, Alameda County, California
- Suñol, Spanish surname
