= Sard-e Sahra Rural District =

Rural district in East Azerbaijan province, Iran

Sard-e Sahra Rural District Persian: دهستان سردصحرا
- Rural District
- Location within Iran
- Coordinates: 37°57′N 46°18′E
- Country: Iran
- Province: East Azerbaijan
- County: Tabriz
- District: Central
- Established: 1987
- Capital: Asenjan

Population (2016)
  - Total: 6,121
- Time zone: UTC+3:30 (IRST)

Sard-e Sahra Rural District (Persian: دهستان سردصحرا) is in the Central District of Tabriz County, East Azerbaijan province, Iran. Its capital is the village of Asenjan. The previous capital of the rural district was the village of Khelejan, now a neighborhood in the city of Tabriz.

== Demographics ==
=== Population ===
At the time of the 2006 National Census, the rural district's population was 12,756 in 3,234 households. There were 12,226 inhabitants in 3,550 households at the following census of 2011. The 2016 census measured the population of the rural district as 6,121 in 1,847 households. The most populous of its six villages was Asenjan, with 1,745 people.

=== Other villages in the rural district ===
- Anarjan
- Chavan (Note: Transferred from Meydan Chay Rural District after the 2016 census)
- Hezehburan
- Korjan
- Shadbad-e Mashayekh
- Varnaq
- Zinjanab
