= Alvar (given name) =

Germanic male given name

- Gender: Male
- Languages: Swedish, Finnish, Spanish
- Name day: 24 September (Estonia, Finland)

Origin
- Origin: From Old Norse Alfarr
- Meaning: Elf warrior
- Region of origin: Northern Europe, Spain

Other names
- Related names: Álvar

Alvar is a masculine given name derived from the Old Norse name Alfarr, formed of the elements alfr ("elf") and arr ("warrior"). The name is now primarily used in Estonia, Finland and Sweden.

People named Alvar include:

- Alvar Aalto (1898–1976), Finnish architect and artist
- Alvar Johannes Alev (born 1993), Estonian cross-country skier
- Alvar Larsson (born 1953), Swedish boy who disappeared in 1967
- Alvar Lidell (1908–1981), British broadcaster
- Alvar Suñol (born 1935), Spanish painter, sculptor, and lithographer
