= Alvar, East Azerbaijan =

Alvar الوار
- Village
- Location within Iran
- Coordinates: 38°25′06″N 47°13′14″E
- Country: Iran
- Province: East Azerbaijan
- County: Ahar
- Bakhsh: Central
- Rural District: Qeshlaq

Population (2006)
  - Total: 82
- Time zone: UTC+3:30 (IRST)
  - Summer (DST): UTC+4:30 (IRDT)

Alvar (Persian: الوار, also Romanized as Alvār) is a village in Qeshlaq Rural District, in the Central District of Ahar County, East Azerbaijan Province, Iran. At the 2006 census, its population was 82, in 17 families.

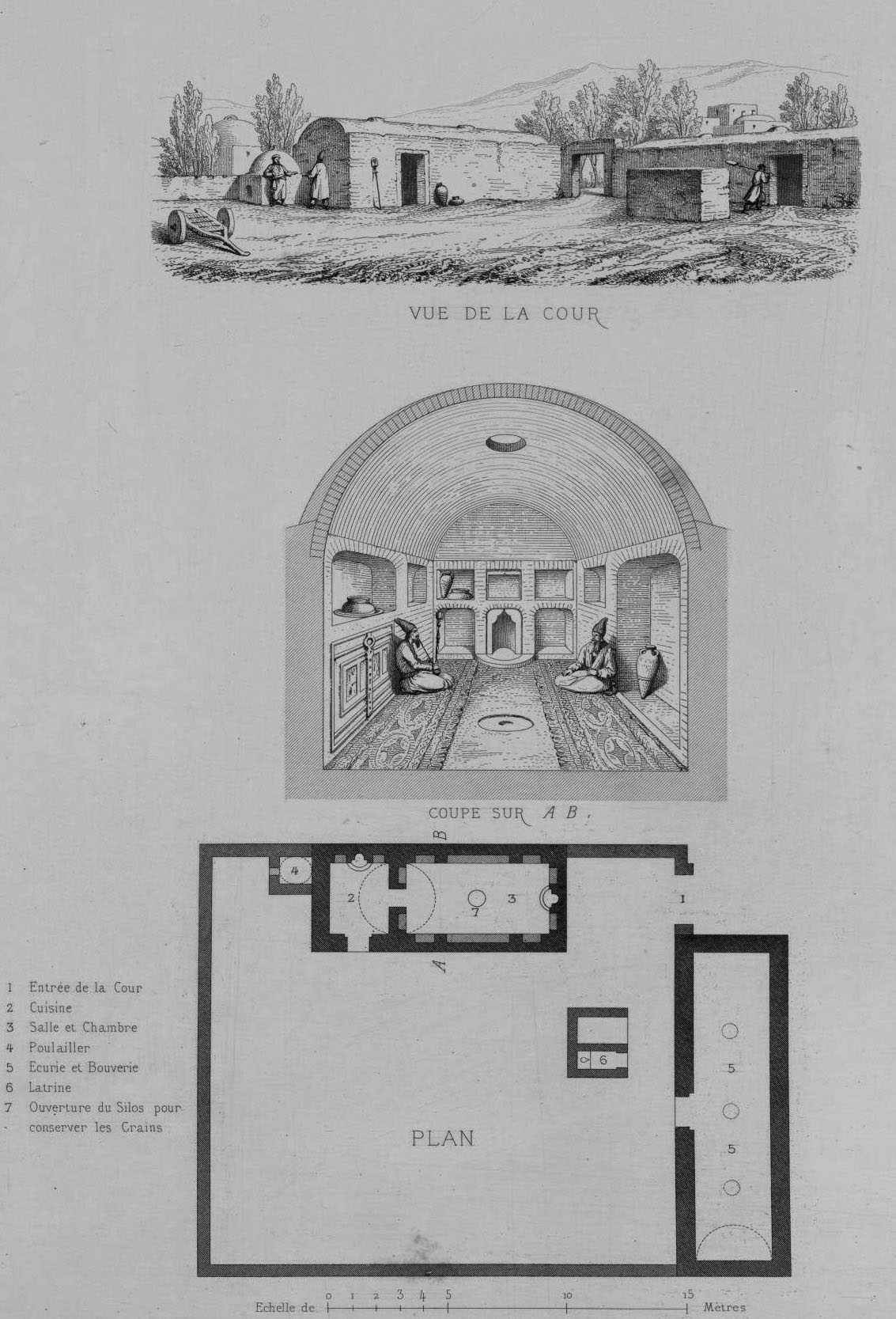
A 19th-century sketch of a house in Alvar.
