= Ağdaş, Jalilabad =

Ağdaş
- Municipality
- Location within Azerbaijan
- Coordinates: 39°05′05″N 48°30′04″E
- Country: Azerbaijan
- Rayon: Jalilabad

Population
  - Total: 2,354
- Time zone: UTC+4 (AZT)

Ağdaş (also, Agdash) is a village and municipality in the Jalilabad Rayon of Azerbaijan. It has a population of 2,354.
