= Aqdash, Kabudarahang =

Aqdash اق داش
- Village
- Location within Iran
- Coordinates: 35°11′12″N 48°25′44″E
- Country: Iran
- Province: Hamadan
- County: Kabudarahang
- Bakhsh: Central
- Rural District: Kuhin

Population (2006)
  - Total: 334
- Time zone: UTC+3:30 (IRST)
  - Summer (DST): UTC+4:30 (IRDT)

Aqdash (Persian: اق داش, also Romanized as Āqdāsh) is a village in Kuhin Rural District, in the Central District of Kabudarahang County, Hamadan Province, Iran. At the 2006 census, its population was 334, in 65 families.
