= Shah Bodagh =

Shah Bodagh شاهبداغ
- Village
- Location within Iran
- Coordinates: 34°05′21″N 47°03′17″E
- Country: Iran
- Province: Kermanshah
- County: Kermanshah
- Bakhsh: Firuzabad
- Rural District: Sar Firuzabad

Population (2006)
  - Total: 106
- Time zone: UTC+3:30 (IRST)
  - Summer (DST): UTC+4:30 (IRDT)

Shah Bodagh (Persian: شاهبداغ, also Romanized as Shāh Bodāgh) is a village in Sar Firuzabad Rural District, Firuzabad District, Kermanshah County, Kermanshah Province, Iran. At the 2006 census, its population was 106, in 17 families.
