= Lahijan, East Azerbaijan =

City in East Azerbaijan province, Iran

Lahijan Persian: لاهيجان
- City
- Location within Iran
- Coordinates: 37°59′07″N 46°05′02″E
- Country: Iran
- Province: East Azerbaijan
- County: Tabriz
- District: Khosrowshah
- Established: 2023

Population (2016)
  - Total: 5,430
- Time zone: UTC+3:30 (IRST)

Lahijan (Persian: لاهيجان) (Note: Also romanized as Lāhījān) is a city in Khosrowshah District of Tabriz County, East Azerbaijan province, Iran. As a village, it served as the capital of Lahijan Rural District (Note: Formerly Shurakat-e Shomali Rural District) until its capital was transferred to the village of Sheykh Hasan.

== Demographics ==
=== Population ===
At the time of the 2006 National Census, Lahijan's population was 3,714 in 971 households, when it was a village in Lahijan Rural District. The following census in 2011 counted 4,701 people in 1,364 households. The 2016 census measured the population of the village as 5,430 people in 1,663 households. It was the most populous village in its rural district.

Lahijan was converted to a city in 2023.
