= Aghdash, Khoy =

Aghdash اغداش
- Village
- Location within Iran
- Coordinates: 38°29′29″N 44°56′27″E
- Country: Iran
- Province: West Azerbaijan
- County: Khoy
- Bakhsh: Central
- Rural District: Rahal

Population (2006)
  - Total: 360
- Time zone: UTC+3:30 (IRST)
  - Summer (DST): UTC+4:30 (IRDT)

Aghdash (Persian: اغداش, also Romanized as Āghdāsh; also known as Āghdāsh-e Jadīd) is a village in Rahal Rural District, in the Central District of Khoy County, West Azerbaijan Province, Iran. At the 2006 census, its population was 360, in 84 families.
