= Marta Bolagh =

Marta Bolagh مرتع بلاغ
- Village
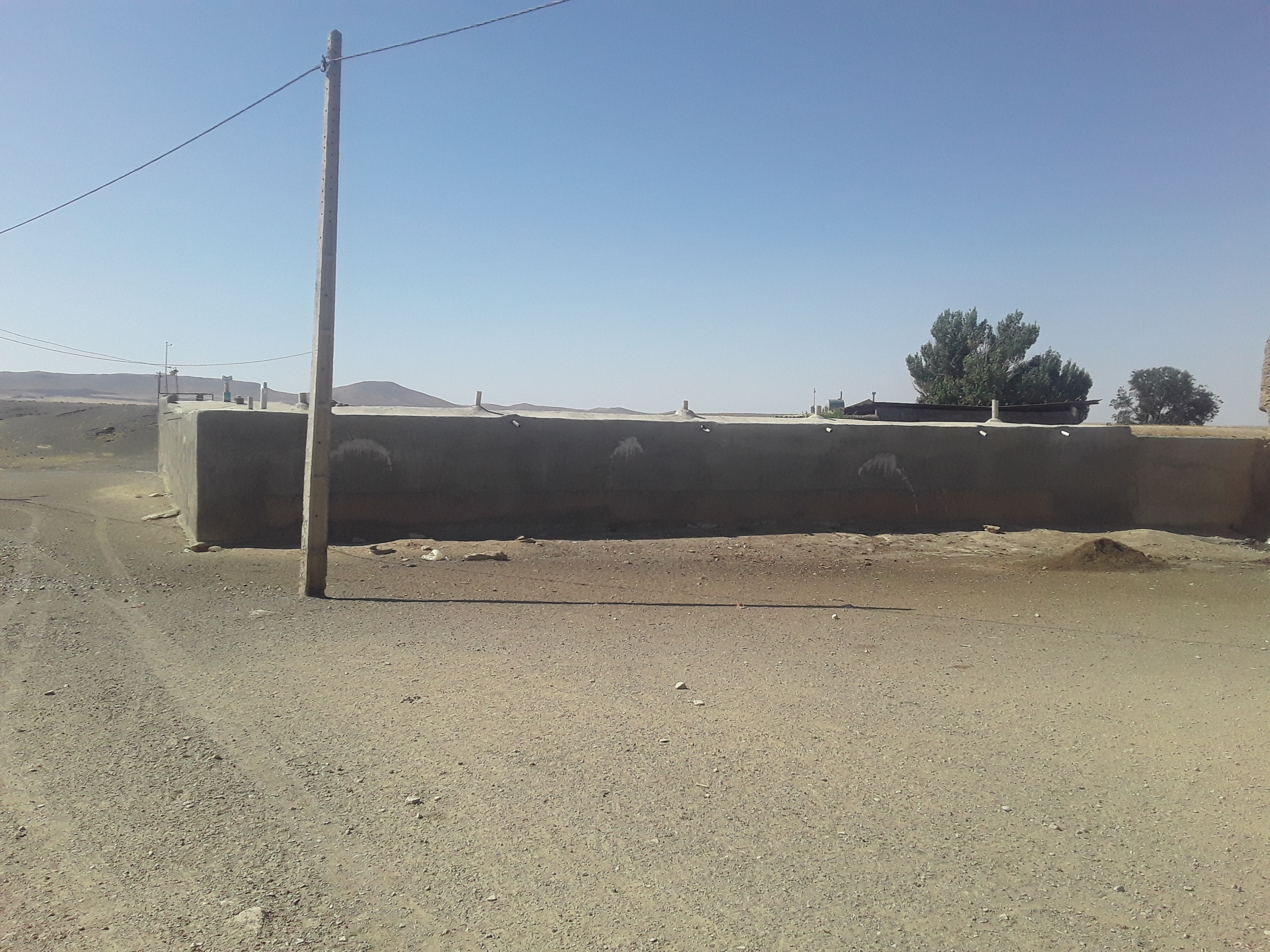
- Marta Bolagh Village

- Location within Iran
- Coordinates: 34°57′36″N 48°46′25″E
- Country: Iran
- Province: Hamadan
- County: Hamadan
- Bakhsh: Central
- Rural District: Sangestan

Population (2006)
  - Total: 75
- Time zone: UTC+3:30 (IRST)
  - Summer (DST): UTC+4:30 (IRDT)

Marta Bolagh (Persian: مرتع بلاغ, also Romanized as Marta‘ Bolāgh; also known as Marta‘ Bodāgh, Shāh Bodāgh, Shāh Bolāgh, and Shāh Bulāq) is a village in Sangestan Rural District, in the Central District of Hamadan County, Hamadan Province, Iran. At the 2006 census, its population was 75, in 17 families.
