= Kord Kandi, Charuymaq =

Kord Kandi كردكندي
- Village
- Location within Iran
- Coordinates: 37°08′13″N 46°51′55″E
- Country: Iran
- Province: East Azerbaijan
- County: Charuymaq
- Bakhsh: Central
- Rural District: Charuymaq-e Markazi

Population (2006)
  - Total: 166
- Time zone: UTC+3:30 (IRST)
  - Summer (DST): UTC+4:30 (IRDT)

Kord Kandi (Persian: كردكندي, also Romanized as Kord Kandī) is a village in Charuymaq-e Markazi Rural District, in the Central District of Charuymaq County, East Azerbaijan Province, Iran. At the 2006 census, its population was 166, in 29 families.
