= Berkarat =

Berkarat Բերքառատ
- Location within Armenia Location within Aragatsotn
- Coordinates: 40°40′53″N 44°10′08″E
- Country: Armenia
- Province: Aragatsotn
- Municipality: Tsaghkahovit

Population (2011)
  - Total: 795
- Time zone: UTC+4
  - Summer (DST): UTC+5

Berkarat (Armenian: Բերքառատ) is a village in the Tsaghkahovit Municipality of the Aragatsotn Province of Armenia.

== Gallery ==
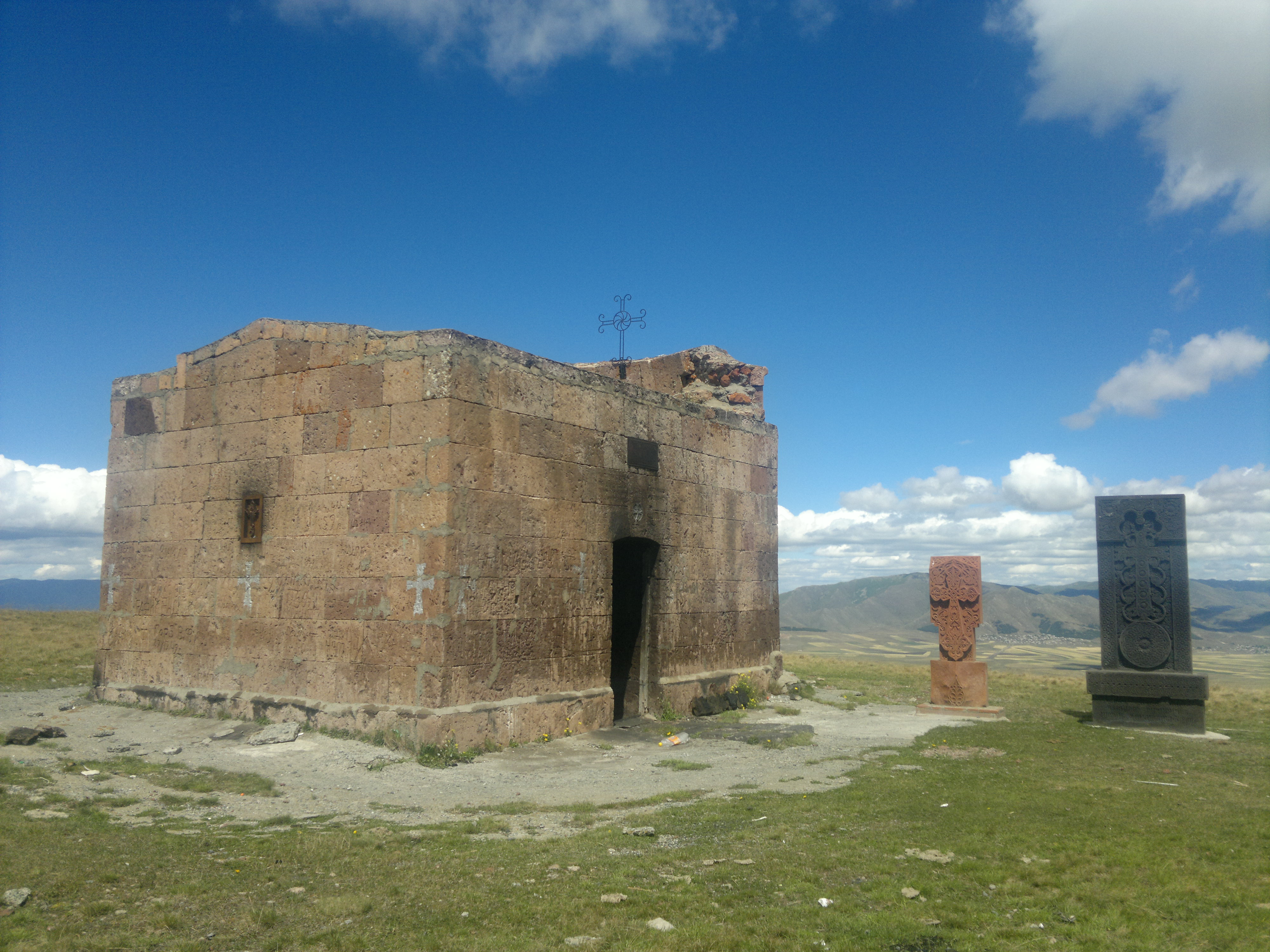
Church in Berkarat
