= Tazeh Kand Rural District (Tabriz County) =

Rural district in East Azerbaijan province, Iran

Tazeh Kand Rural District Persian: دهستان تازه كند
- Rural District
- Location within Iran
- Coordinates: 38°01′N 45°58′E
- Country: Iran
- Province: East Azerbaijan
- County: Tabriz
- District: Khosrowshah
- Established: 1997
- Capital: Tazeh Kand

Population (2016)
  - Total: 10,401
- Time zone: UTC+3:30 (IRST)

Tazeh Kand Rural District (Persian: دهستان تازه كند) is in Khosrowshah District of Tabriz County, East Azerbaijan province, Iran. Its capital is the village of Tazeh Kand.

== Demographics ==
=== Population ===
At the time of the 2006 National Census, the rural district's population was 9,156 in 1,944 households. There were 10,011 inhabitants in 2,883 households at the following census of 2011. The 2016 census measured the population of the rural district as 10,401 in 3,167 households. The most populous of its seven villages was Akhuleh, with 2,826 people.

=== Other villages in the rural district ===
- Baranlu
- Nowjeh Deh
- Qareh Tappeh
- Satellu
