= Alwa (folk music group) =

Former Swedish music group

Alwa was a Swedish folk music group which released an album in 2002 but dissolved after a brief career.

== Band Members ==
- Anna Elwing —- violin, vocal
- Karin Ohlsson —- violin
- Torbjörn Righard —- flute, saxophone
- Jonas Göransson —- guitar
- Tina Quartey —- percussion

== Discography ==
=== Albums ===
- 2002 — Alwa, Amigo, AMCD 747
