= Aqdash, Saveh =

Aqdash اقداش
- Village
- Location within Iran
- Coordinates: 35°16′48″N 49°30′53″E
- Country: Iran
- Province: Markazi
- County: Saveh
- Bakhsh: Nowbaran
- Rural District: Kuhpayeh

Population (2006)
  - Total: 157
- Time zone: UTC+3:30 (IRST)
  - Summer (DST): UTC+4:30 (IRDT)

Aqdash (Persian: اقداش, also Romanized as Āqdāsh) is a village in Kuhpayeh Rural District, Nowbaran District, Saveh County, Markazi Province, Iran. At the 2006 census, its population was 157, in 67 families.
