= Aq Dash, Torbat-e Heydarieh =

Aq Dash اقداش
- Village
- Location within Iran
- Coordinates: 35°42′36″N 59°10′49″E
- Country: Iran
- Province: Razavi Khorasan
- County: Torbat-e Heydarieh
- Bakhsh: Jolgeh Rokh
- Rural District: Bala Rokh

Population (2006)
  - Total: 135
- Time zone: UTC+3:30 (IRST)
  - Summer (DST): UTC+4:30 (IRDT)

Aq Dash (Persian: اقداش, also Romanized as Āq Dāsh; also known as Āq Dāsh-e Pā’īn) is a village in Bala Rokh Rural District, Jolgeh Rokh District, Torbat-e Heydarieh County, Razavi Khorasan Province, Iran. At the 2006 census, its population was 135, in 26 families.

== See also ==
- List of cities, towns and villages in Razavi Khorasan Province
