= Espero =

Espero may mean:

- Daewoo Espero, a car made by the South Korean company Daewoo Motors.
- La Espero, an Esperanto poem written by L. L. Zamenhof.
- Espero, a Slovak publishing house for Esperanto literature.
- Battle of the Espero Convoy, a naval battle in the Mediterranean during WWII.
