= Esparron =

Esparron may refer to the following places in France:

- Esparron, Hautes-Alpes, a commune in the department of Hautes-Alpes
- Esparron, Haute-Garonne, a commune in the department of Haute-Garonn
- Esparron-de-Pallières, a commune in the department of Var
