= Alvar Suñol =

Spanish painter, sculptor and lithographer

Àlvar Suñol Munoz-Ramos, also known as Alvar (born January 29, 1935), is a Spanish painter, sculptor and lithographer. He is one of the few remaining living Modernist artists.

== Career ==
Born in Montgat, Spain, a Catalan fishing village on the Mediterranean coast near Barcelona, Alvar first began painting at the age of 12. He was accepted to the Escuela Superior de Bellas Artes de San Jorge in Barcelona when he was 17. At age 18, he won the Young Painter's Prize in a competition sponsored by the city of Barcelona and his painting was acquired by the Museum of Modern Art in Barcelona for its permanent collection. In 1957, he had his first solo exhibition in the Galleries Layetana in Barcelona. In 1959, after serving in the Spanish Military, Alvar won a scholarship to the Institut Francais in Paris.

In 1960, Alvar met Juan Fuentes, director of the Galerie Drouant in Paris. After Fuentes sold Alvar's first set of paintings in a week, Alvar signed a contract with the gallery. It was at that time Alvar married his childhood sweetheart, Rosella Berenguer, who came to live in Paris with him. He was invited to join the School of Paris, a group of the top young artists in Spain, organized by the Charpentier Gallery. In Paris in the 1960s, he showed with other prestigious Spanish artists including Miro, Dali, and Picasso. In 1962, the Monede Gallery in New York showed Alvar's work in his first exhibition in the United States. In 1963, Alvar produced his first original lithographs for a one-man show at Galerie Drouant. He became known by art collectors for original lithographs and exhibited regularly throughout the United States, Europe, Canada and Japan. Between 1975 and 1990 his creative efforts were focused predominantly on his lithographic works. After ten years in Paris, he returned to Spain where he has lived and worked out of his studio through the present.

When he turned seventy, Alvar transitioned from lithography and rededicated himself to painting in the form of large-scale paintings encompassing a range of subjects from ethereal interiors to biblical narratives.

In 2001, he was commissioned to design a public mixed media mural of the four seasons for Tiana, a suburb of Barcelona. In 2003, he was commissioned to create a permanent public installation in the Plaza de Mallorquines, across from the train station, in Montgat, Spain, a suburb of Barcelona; he designed an 18-foot sculpture titled "Mediterranea." In 2008, he was commissioned to create a sculpture of Catalan cellist Pablo Casals that stands in the Boulogne Billancourt area of Paris.

Alvar works in watercolor, oil, ceramics, engravings, sculpture, lithography, graphite drawings, murals and monuments. His works have been on display in over 40 museums (exhibitions and permanent collections) and over 95 galleries and museums throughout the United States, Europe and Japan.

== Style and influences ==
Alvar is known for his technical expertise. He is passionate about his concept of el oficio, the commitment to his vocation and appreciation for the traditional artistic values bequeathed by the masters. Renaissance artists, especially Piero della Francesca, Vermeer and Balthus, are particularly admired by him. He views his work as an inheritance from and devotion to Catalonia, specifically Romanesque art, yet imbued with a modern sensibility. His themes, though varied, remain steadfast in their revelations about the human condition and complexities, about love and peace. Time is a prominent and recurring theme, referencing history and art history.

== Museum Shows ==
2009 Persistències: Exposicio de Dibuixos, Museo de Dibujo Julio Gabin, Castillo de Larrés, Huesca, Spain; 2008 Inauguració de l'Escultura, "A Pau Casals" al career Pau Casals, Boulogne-Villencourt, Paris, France; 2007 Alvar Suñol: Retrospectiva 1954-2008, Museu de Badalona, Barcelona, Spain; 2007 The Georgia Centet, University of Georgia, Athens, Georgia, USA 2007 Alvar: Contemporary Renaissance, A Retrospective, Albany Museum of Art, Albany, Georgia, USA; 2007 Alvar Suñol: A Retrospective, Appleton Museum of Art, Ocala, Florida, USA; 2003 Realizació de l'escultura "Mediterrània" situada a la Plaça de les Mallorquines, Montgat, Montgat, Spain; 2001 Alvar: Huellas en el tiempo, A Retrospective, Instituto Cervantes, Toulouse & Bordeaux, France; 2001 Lithographs by Alvar, Retrospective, Georgia Museum of Art, Athens, Georgia, USA; 2000 Alvar: Empremptes en el temps, Abadia de Sant Miquel del Fai, Barcelona, Spain; 1999 Heullas en el Timpo, Retrospective, Sala Moneo, Ayuntamiento de Logroño; 1999 Heullas en el Timpo, Retrospective, Centro Cultural Ibercaja, Guadalajara; 1997 Empremptes en el temps, Retrospective, Castell de Benedormiens, Castell d'Aro, Girona, Spain; 1983 Wichita Museum of Art, Wichita, Kansas, USA; 1982 Utah Museum of Fine Art, Salt Lake City, Utah, USA; 1978 Musée Hyacinthe Rigaud, Perpinyà, Spain

== Museum Collections ==
Albany Museum of Art (Albany, Georgia, USA); Appleton Museum of Art (Ocala, Florida, USA); Art Center of La Jolla (La Jolla, California, USA); Casa de Cultura (Girona, Spain); Casa-Museo de Goya (Fuendetodos, Spain); Cultural Ibercaja (Guadalajara, Spain); Colleció del Banc de Sabadell (Sabadell, Spain); Finch College (New York, USA); Fukuoka Museum (Fukuoka, Japan); Fons d'art del Castell de Benedormiens (Castell d'Aro, Spain); Gabinet des Estampes Musée de Berlin-Dahlem (Berlin, Germany); Georgia Museum of Art (Athens, Georgia, USA); Glassboro State College (Glassboro, New Jersey, USA) Huellas en el Tiempo (Logroo, Spain) Instituto Cervantes (Bordeaux & Toulouse, France); Jamestown College (Jamestown, North Dakota, USA); Kumamoto Museum (Kumamoto, Japan); Liberty University (Lynchburg, Virginia, USA); Musée Hyacinthe Rigaud (Perpignan, France); Museo de Dibujo Julio Gavín (Osca, Spain;) Museo del Grabado (Zaragoza, Spain); Museo del Grabado Contemporáneo (Marbella, Spain); Museo de Badalona (Badalona, Spain); Museu Europeu d'Art Modern (Barcelona, Spain); Museu Nacional d'Art de Catalunya (Barcelona, Spain); Museum of Biblical Art (Dallas, Texas, USA); Utah Museum of Fine Art (Salt Lake City, Utah, USA); Wichita Art Museum (Wichita, Kansas, USA)

== Retrospectives ==
2016 Una Vida Pintant 1954-2016, Castell de Calonge, Girona, Spain; 2015 Passat i Present 1954-2015, Castell de Benedormiens, Castell d'Aro, Spain; 2015 Interiors, Museu de la Mediterrània, Girona, Spain; 2014 Alvar Suñol: Una antològica des del 1954-2014, Casa de Cultura de la Diputació de Girona, Girona, Spain

== Publications ==
- The Religious Art of Alvar Suñol (2017)
- Alvar Suñol: Una Vida Pintant 1954 - 2016 (2016)
- Alvar: Yesterday Today Tomorrow (2016)
- Alvar Suñol: Passat i Present 1954 - 2015 (2015)
- Diari de Girona (2014)
- Art Gallery Premieres First European Exhibit/The Liberty Champion (2014)
- Spain's Alvar Seeks Venues for Inspiration/Art & Antiques (2013)
- Essence of Art/American Art Collector(2008)
- Alvar in Color in Poetry. With poems by Marjorie Agosin (2005)
- Alvar: Thirty Years of Lithography(2001)
- Alvar (1993)

=== Documentary ===
- "Alvar Suñol: His Vision and His Art" a documentary movie about the artist written by Dr. Betty Jean Craige and Alan Stecker (2006)
