= Basmenj =

City in East Azerbaijan province, Iran

Basmenj Persian: باسمنج
- City
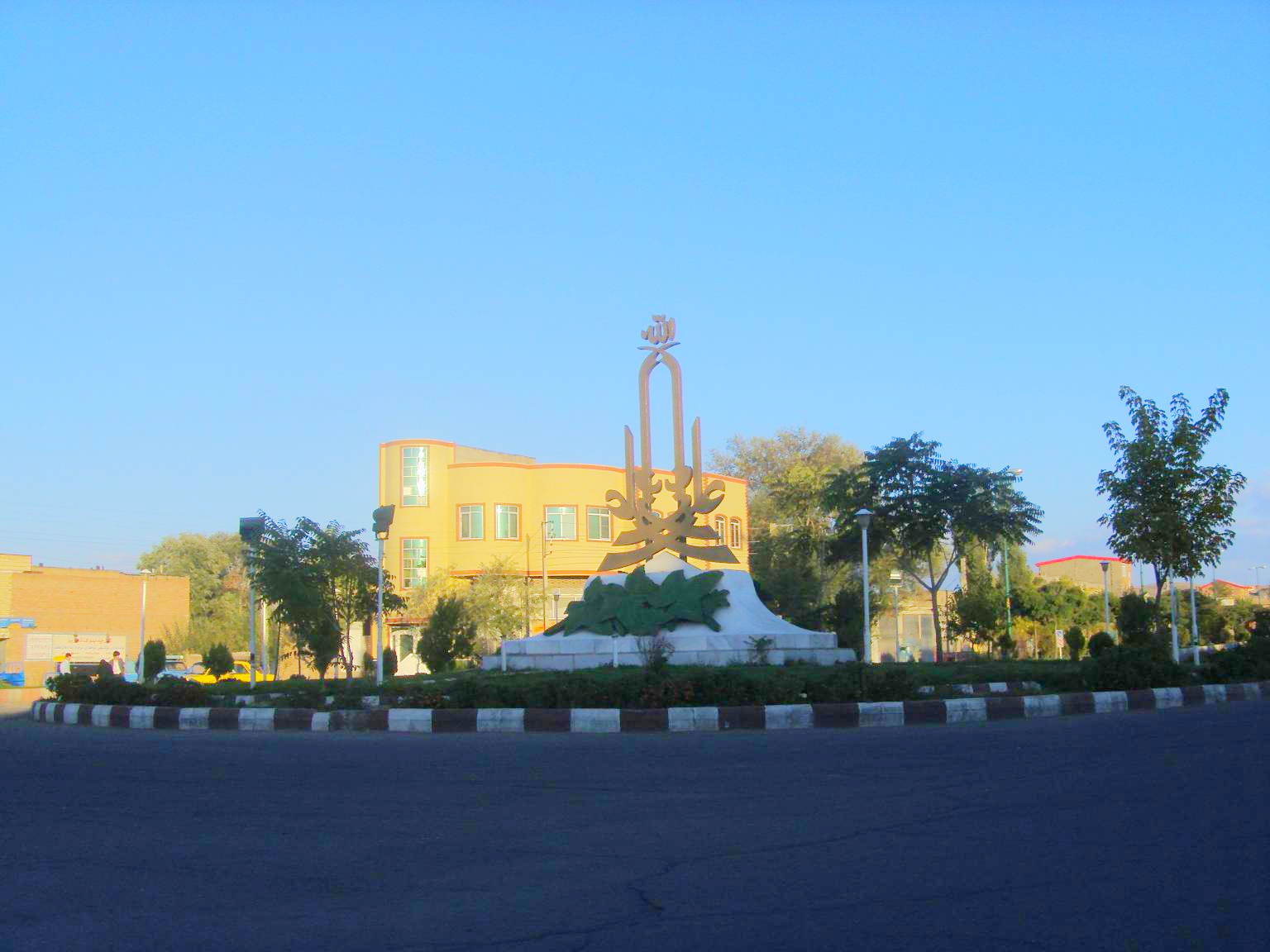

- Location within Iran
- Coordinates: 37°59′46″N 46°28′20″E
- Country: Iran
- Province: East Azerbaijan
- County: Tabriz
- District: Basmenj
- Elevation: 1,791 m (5,876 ft)

Population (2016)
  - Total: 12,692
- Time zone: UTC+3:30 (IRST)

Basmenj (Persian: باسمنج) (Note: Also romanized as Bāsmenj; also known as Bāsmej and Bāsmīnj) is a city in, and the capital of, Basmenj District in Tabriz County, East Azerbaijan province, Iran. Basmenj is located 10 kilometres (6.2 mi) southeast of Tabriz and lies at an altitude of 1,791 metres (5,876 ft), covering an area of 2 square kilometres.

== Demographics ==
=== Population ===
At the time of the 2006 National Census, the city's population was 10,736 in 2,873 households, when it was in the Central District. The following census in 2011 counted 11,190 people in 3,283 households. The 2016 census measured the population of the city as 12,692 people in 3,890 households.

In 2021, the city was separated from the district in the establishment of Basmenj District.
