= Lahijan Rural District (Tabriz County) =

Rural district in East Azerbaijan province, Iran

Lahijan Rural District Persian: دهستان لاهيجان
- Rural District
- Location within Iran
- Coordinates: 37°59′N 46°05′E
- Country: Iran
- Province: East Azerbaijan
- County: Tabriz
- District: Khosrowshah
- Established: 1987
- Capital: Sheykh Hasan

Population (2016)
  - Total: 16,290
- Time zone: UTC+3:30 (IRST)

Lahijan Rural District (Persian: دهستان لاهيجان) (Note: Formerly Shurakat-e Shomali Rural District (دهستان شوركات شمالی)) is in Khosrowshah District of Tabriz County, East Azerbaijan province, Iran. Its capital is the village of Sheykh Hasan. The previous capital of the rural district was the village of Lahijan, now a city.

== Demographics ==
=== Population ===
At the time of the 2006 National Census, the rural district's population was 14,052 in 3,713 households. There were 15,768 inhabitants in 4,607 households at the following census of 2011. The 2016 census measured the population of the rural district as 16,290 in 5,017 households. The most populous of its eight villages was Lahijan (now a city), with 5,430 people.

=== Other villages in the rural district ===
- Aspos
- Nirugah-e Hararati
- Qalehcheh
- Radar Tabriz
- Yengi Kandi
