= Esperan Rural District =

Rural district in East Azerbaijan province, Iran

Esperan Rural District Persian: دهستان اسپران
- Rural District
- Location within Iran
- Coordinates: 38°17′N 46°21′E
- Country: Iran
- Province: East Azerbaijan
- County: Tabriz
- District: Central
- Established: 1987
- Capital: Yengi Esperan

Population (2016)
  - Total: 14,393
- Time zone: UTC+3:30 (IRST)

Esperan Rural District (Persian: دهستان اسپران) is in the Central District of Tabriz County, East Azerbaijan province, Iran. Its capital is the village of Yengi Esperan.

== Demographics ==
=== Population ===
At the time of the 2006 National Census, the rural district's population was 8,403 in 2,152 households. There were 12,939 inhabitants in 3,594 households at the following census of 2011. The 2016 census measured the population of the rural district as 14,393 in 4,278 households. The most populous of its 19 villages was Ana Khatun (now a neighborhood in the city of Tabriz), with 8,288 people.

=== Other villages in the rural district ===
- Bababaghi Hospice
- Gomanj-e Olya
- Sefidan-e Atiq
- Uli
