= Khosrowshah District =

District in East Azerbaijan province, Iran

Khosrowshah District Persian: بخش خسروشاه
- District
- Location within Iran
- Coordinates: 38°00′N 46°01′E
- Country: Iran
- Province: East Azerbaijan
- County: Tabriz
- Established: 1997
- Capital: Khosrowshah

Population (2016)
  - Total: 48,663
- Time zone: UTC+3:30 (IRST)

Khosrowshah District (Persian: بخش خسروشاه) is in Tabriz County, East Azerbaijan province, Iran. Its capital is the city of Khosrowshah.

== Etymology ==
The name of the district derives from Khusrau Shah, king of the Justanids during the 10th century. The words "Khosrow" and "Shah" are both Persian words that mean "king."

== History ==
The villages of Esfahlan and Lahijan were converted to cities in 2023.

== Demographics ==
=== Population ===
At the time of the 2006 census, the district's population was 36,002 in 9,276 households. The following census in 2011 counted 38,226 people in 11,279 households. The 2016 census measured the population of the district as 48,663 inhabitants in 15,054 households.

=== Administrative divisions ===
Khosrowshah District Population
Administrative Divisions	2006	2011	2016
Lahijan RD (Note: Formerly Shurakat-e Shomali Rural District)	14,052	15,768	16,290
Tazeh Kand RD	9,156	10,011	10,401
Esfahlan (city) (Note: Became a city after the 2016 census)			
Khosrowshah (city)	12,794	12,447	21,972
Lahijan (city)			
Total	36,002	38,226	48,663
RD = Rural District
