= Meydan Chay Rural District =

Rural district in East Azerbaijan province, Iran

Meydan Chay Rural District Persian: دهستان میدان چای
- Rural District
- Location within Iran
- Coordinates: 37°51′45″N 46°27′08″E
- Country: Iran
- Province: East Azerbaijan
- County: Tabriz
- District: Basmenj
- Established: 1987
- Capital: Nematabad

Population (2016)
  - Total: 56,677
- Time zone: UTC+3:30 (IRST)

Meydan Chay Rural District (Persian: دهستان میدان چای) is in Basmenj District of Tabriz County, East Azerbaijan province, Iran. Its capital is the village of Nematabad. The previous capital of the rural district was the village of Kond Rud.

== Demographics ==
=== Population ===
At the time of the 2006 National Census, the rural district's population (as a part of the Central District) was 51,733 in 13,066 households. There were 56,199 inhabitants in 16,365 households at the following census of 2011. The 2016 census measured the population of the rural district as 56,677 in 17,411 households. The most populous of its 23 villages was Kond Rud, with 8,518 people.

In 2021, the rural district was separated from the district in the formation of Basmenj District.

=== Other villages in the rural district ===
- Arpa Darrehsi
- Bagh-e Yaqub
- Dizaj-e Leyli Khani
- Eskandar
- Estiar
- Gavar
- Kolluk Daraq
- Malek Kian
- Tuyqun

== See also ==
Fathabad and Karkaj, former villages and now neighborhoods of Tabriz
