= Basmenj District =

District in East Azerbaijan province, Iran

Basmenj District Persian: بخش باسمنج
- District
- Location within Iran
- Coordinates: 37°55′N 46°29′E
- Country: Iran
- Province: East Azerbaijan
- County: Tabriz
- Established: 2021
- Capital: Basmenj
- Time zone: UTC+3:30 (IRST)

Basmenj District (Persian: بخش باسمنج) is in Tabriz County, East Azerbaijan province, Iran. Its capital is the city of Basmenj, whose population at the time of the 2016 National Census was 12,692 people in 3,890 households.

== History ==
The new city of Shahr-e Jadid-e Shahriar was formed in 2015. In 2021, Meydan Chay Rural District and the city of Basmenj were separated from the Central District in the formation of Basmenj District.

== Demographics ==
=== Administrative divisions ===
Basmenj District
Administrative Divisions
Mehranrud RD (Note: Established after the 2016 census)
Meydan Chay RD
Basmenj (city)
Shahr-e Jadid-e Shahriar (city)
RD = Rural District
