= Central District (Tabriz County) =

District in East Azerbaijan province, Iran

Central District (Tabriz County) Persian: بخش مرکزی شهرستان تبریز
- District
- Location within Iran
- Coordinates: 38°06′N 46°18′E
- Country: Iran
- Province: East Azerbaijan
- County: Tabriz
- Capital: Tabriz

Population (2016)
  - Total: 1,724,369
- Time zone: UTC+3:30 (IRST)

The Central District of Tabriz County (Persian: بخش مرکزی شهرستان تبریز) is in East Azerbaijan province, Iran. Its capital is the city of Tabriz.

== History ==
In 2021, Meydan Chay Rural District and the city of Basmenj were separated from the district in the formation of Basmenj District.

== Demographics ==
=== Population ===
At the time of the 2006 National Census, the district's population was 1,521,239 in 414,499 households. The following census in 2011 counted 1,656,868 people in 502,004 households. The 2016 census measured the population of the district as 1,724,369 inhabitants in 548,605 households.

=== Administrative divisions ===
Central District (Tabriz County) Population
Administrative Divisions	2006	2011	2016
Aji Chay RD	33,818	42,460	46,054
Esperan RD	8,403	12,939	14,393
Meydan Chay RD (Note: Transferred to Basmenj District)	51,733	56,199	56,677
Sard-e Sahra RD	12,756	12,226	6,121
Basmenj (city)	10,736	11,190	12,692
Sardrud (city)	24,858	26,856	29,739
Tabriz (city)	1,378,935	1,495,452	1,558,693
Total	1,521,239	1,656,868	1,724,369
RD = Rural District
