= Tabriz County =

County in East Azerbaijan province, Iran

Tabriz County Persian: شهرستان تبریز
- County
- Location of Tabriz County in East Azerbaijan Province (center, green)

- Location of East Azerbaijan Province in Iran
- Coordinates: 38°06′N 46°17′E
- Country: Iran
- Province: East Azerbaijan
- Capital: Tabriz
- Districts: Central, Basmenj, Khosrowshahr

Population (2016)
  - Total: 1,773,033
- Time zone: UTC+3:30 (IRST)

Tabriz County (Persian: شهرستان تبریز) is in East Azerbaijan Province, Iran. Its capital is the city of Tabriz.

== History ==
The new city of Shahr-e Jadid-e Shahriar was formed in 2015. In 2021, Meydan Chay Rural District and the city of Basmenj were separated from the Central District in the formation of Basmenj District, including the new Mehranrud Rural District. The villages of Esfahlan and Lahijan were converted to cities in 2023.

== Demographics ==
=== Population ===
At the time of the 2006 census, the county's population was 1,557,241 in 423,775 households. The following census in 2011 counted 1,695,094 people in 513,142 households. The 2016 census measured the population of the county as 1,773,033 in 563,660 households.

=== Administrative divisions ===
Tabriz County's population history and administrative structure over three consecutive censuses are shown in the following table.

Tabriz County Population
Administrative Divisions	2006	2011	2016
Central District	1,521,239	1,656,868	1,724,369
Aji Chay RD	33,818	42,460	46,054
Esperan RD	8,403	12,939	14,393
Meydan Chay RD	51,733	56,199	56,677
Sard-e Sahra RD	12,756	12,226	6,121
Basmenj (city)	10,736	11,190	12,692
Sardrud (city)	24,858	26,856	29,739
Tabriz (city)	1,378,935	1,495,452	1,558,693
Basmenj District (Note: Established after the 2016 census)			
Mehranrud RD			
Meydan Chay RD			
Basmenj (city)			
Shahr-e Jadid-e Shahriar (city) (Note: Established in 2015)			
Khosrowshah District	36,002	38,226	48,663
Lahijan RD (Note: Formerly Shurakat-e Shomali Rural District)	14,052	15,768	16,290
Tazeh Kand RD	9,156	10,011	10,401
Esfahlan (city) (Note: Became a city after the 2016 census)			
Khosrowshah (city)	12,794	12,447	21,972
Lahijan (city)			
Total	1,557,241	1,695,094	1,773,033
RD = Rural District

== See also ==
Media related to Tabriz County at Wikimedia Commons
