= Safiabad, Torqabeh and Shandiz =

Village in Razavi Khorasan province, Iran

Safiabad Persian: صفي اباد
- Village
- Location within Iran
- Coordinates: 36°22′34″N 59°25′58″E
- Country: Iran
- Province: Razavi Khorasan
- County: Torqabeh and Shandiz
- District: Shandiz
- Rural District: Shandiz

Population (2016)
  - Total: 128
- Time zone: UTC+3:30 (IRST)

Safiabad (Persian: صفي اباد) (Note: Also romanized as Şafīābād) is a village in Shandiz Rural District of Shandiz District in Torqabeh and Shandiz County, (Note: Formerly Binalud County) Razavi Khorasan province, Iran.

== Demographics ==
=== Population ===
At the time of the 2006 National Census, the village's population was 67 in 16 households, when it was in Torqabeh Rural District of Torqabeh District in Mashhad County. The following census in 2011 counted 123 people in 33 households, by which time the district had been separated from the county in the establishment of Binalud County. (Note: Renamed Torqabeh and Shandiz County) Safiabad was transferred to Shandiz Rural District in the new Shandiz District. The 2016 census measured the population of the village as 128 people in 38 households.
