= Fiani =

Village in Razavi Khorasan province, Iran

Fiani Persian: فياني
- Village
- Location within Iran
- Coordinates: 36°22′39″N 59°25′34″E
- Country: Iran
- Province: Razavi Khorasan
- County: Torqabeh and Shandiz
- District: Shandiz
- Rural District: Shandiz

Population (2016)
  - Total: 229
- Time zone: UTC+3:30 (IRST)

Fiani (Persian: فياني) (Note: Also romanized as Fīānī) is a village in Shandiz Rural District of Shandiz District in Torqabeh and Shandiz County, (Note: Formerly Binalud County) Razavi Khorasan province, Iran.

== Demographics ==
=== Population ===
At the time of the 2006 National Census, the village's population was 26 in nine households, when it was in Torqabeh Rural District of Torqabeh District in Mashhad County. The following census in 2011 counted 80 people in 24 households, by which time the district had been separated from the county in the establishment of Binalud County. (Note: Renamed Torqabeh and Shandiz County) Fiani was transferred to Shandiz Rural District in the new Shandiz District. The 2016 census measured the population of the village as 229 people in 73 households.
