= Kalateh-ye Mown =

Village in Razavi Khorasan province, Iran

Kalateh-ye Mown Persian: كلاته معاون
- Village
- Location within Iran
- Coordinates: 36°25′12″N 59°15′29″E
- Country: Iran
- Province: Razavi Khorasan
- County: Torqabeh and Shandiz
- District: Shandiz
- Rural District: Abardeh

Population (2016)
  - Total: Below reporting threshold
- Time zone: UTC+3:30 (IRST)

Kalateh-ye Mown (Persian: كلاته معاون) (Note: Also romanized as Kalāteh-ye Mʿown) is a village in Abardeh Rural District of Shandiz District in Torqabeh and Shandiz County, (Note: Formerly Binalud County) Razavi Khorasan province, Iran.

== Demographics ==
=== Population ===
At the time of the 2006 National Census, the village's population was 29 in seven households, when it was in Shandiz Rural District of Torqabeh District in Mashhad County. The following census in 2011 counted 27 people in 17 households, by which time the district had been separated from the county in the establishment of Binalud County. (Note: Renamed Torqabeh and Shandiz County) The rural district was transferred to the new Shandiz District, and Kalateh-ye Mown was transferred to Abardeh Rural District created in the same district. The 2016 census measured the population of the village as below the reporting threshold.
