= Archang =

Neighborhood in Razavi Khorasan province, Iran

Archang Persian: ارچنگ
- Neighborhood
- Location within Iran
- Country: Iran
- Province: Razavi Khorasan
- County: Torqabeh and Shandiz
- District: Shandiz
- City: Shandiz

Population (2006)
  - Total: 1,830
- Time zone: UTC+3:30 (IRST)

Archang (Persian: ارچنگ) is a neighborhood in the city of Shandiz in Shandiz District of Torqabeh and Shandiz County, (Note: Formerly Binalud County) Razavi Khorasan province, Iran.

== Demographics ==
=== Population ===
At the time of the 2006 National Census, Archang's population was 1,830 in 523 households, when it was a village in, and the capital of, Shandiz Rural District in Torqabeh District of Mashhad County. After the census, the village was annexed by the city of Shandiz.

In 2022, the district was separated from the county in the establishment of Binalud County, (Note: Renamed Torqabeh and Shandiz County) and the rural district was transferred to the new Shandiz District.
