= Kang, Razavi Khorasan =

Village in Razavi Khorasan province, Iran

Kang Persian: كنگ
- Village
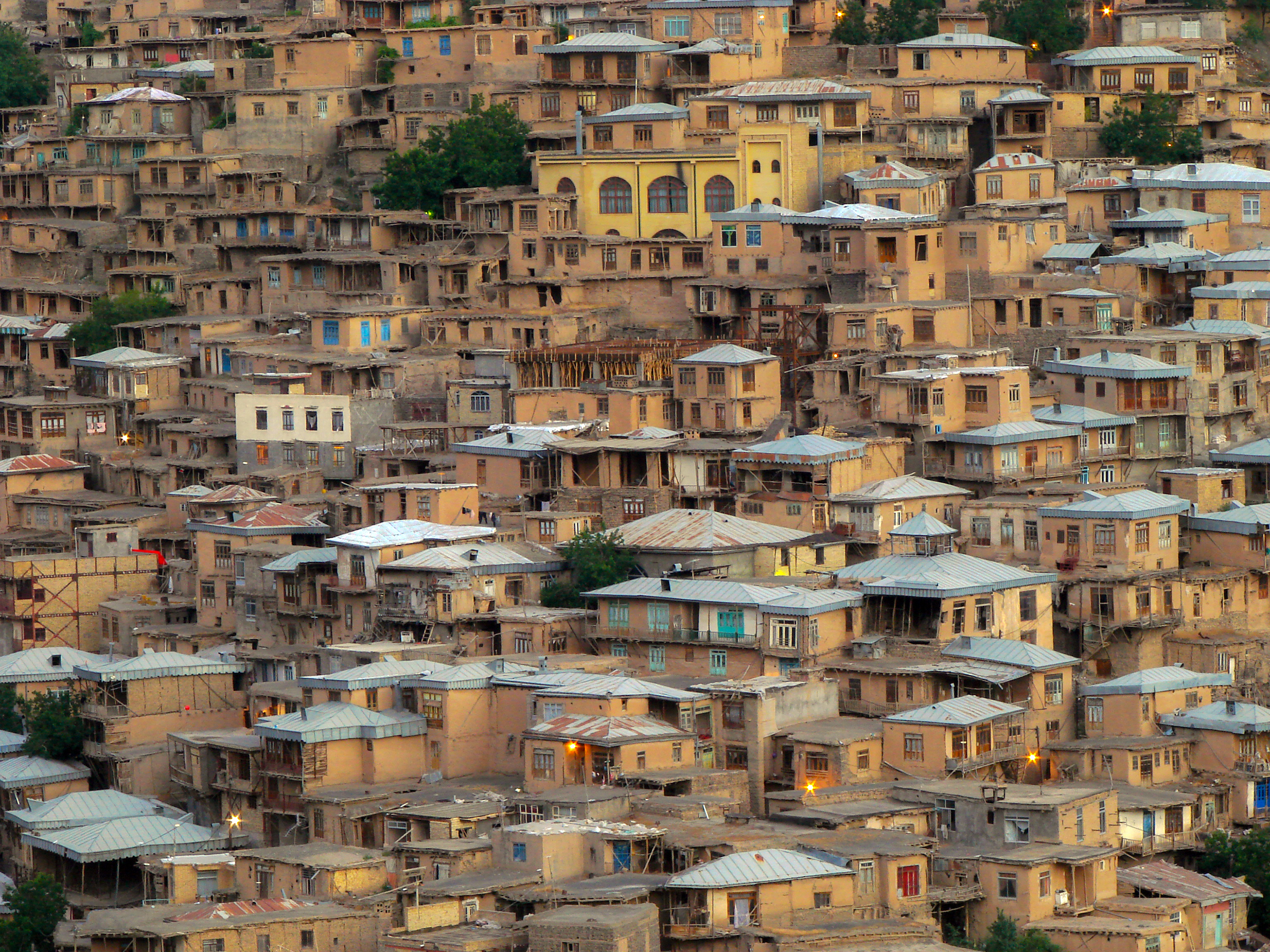
- The village of Kang

- Location within Iran
- Coordinates: 36°19′12″N 59°13′23″E
- Country: Iran
- Province: Razavi Khorasan
- County: Torqabeh and Shandiz
- District: Torqabeh
- Rural District: Jagharq

Population (2016)
  - Total: 1,463
- Time zone: UTC+3:30 (IRST)

Kang (Persian: كنگ) is a village in Jagharq Rural District of Torqabeh District in Torqabeh and Shandiz County, (Note: Formerly Binalud County) Razavi Khorasan province, Iran.

== Demographics ==
=== Population ===
At the time of the 2006 National Census, the village's population was 1,472 in 354 households, when it was in Torqabeh Rural District of Mashhad County. The following census in 2011 counted 799 people in 271 households, by which time the district had been separated from the county in the establishment of Binalud County. (Note: Renamed Torqabeh and Shandiz County) Kang was transferred to Jagharq Rural District created in the same district. The 2016 census measured the population of the village as 1,463 people in 271 households.
