= Kalateh-ye Ahan =

Village in Razavi Khorasan province, Iran

Kalateh-ye Ahan Persian: كلاته اهن
- Village
- Location within Iran
- Coordinates: 36°16′04″N 59°20′10″E
- Country: Iran
- Province: Razavi Khorasan
- County: Torqabeh and Shandiz
- District: Torqabeh
- Rural District: Jagharq

Population (2016)
  - Total: 342
- Time zone: UTC+3:30 (IRST)

Kalateh-ye Ahan (Persian: كلاته اهن) (Note: Also romanized as Kalāteh-ye Āhan) is a village in Jagharq Rural District of Torqabeh District in Torqabeh and Shandiz County, (Note: Formerly Binalud County) Razavi Khorasan province, Iran.

== Demographics ==
=== Population ===
At the time of the 2006 National Census, the village's population was 277 in 67 households, when it was in Torqabeh Rural District of Mashhad County. The following census in 2011 counted 300 people in 94 households, by which time the district had been separated from the county in the establishment of Binalud County. (Note: Renamed Torqabeh and Shandiz County) Kalateh-ye Ahan was transferred to Jagharq Rural District created in the same district. The 2016 census measured the population of the village as 342 people in 108 households.
