= Hesar-e Sorkh, Torqabeh and Shandiz =

Village in Razavi Khorasan province, Iran

Hesar-e Sorkh Persian: حصارسرخ
- Village
- Location within Iran
- Coordinates: 36°24′48″N 59°20′22″E
- Country: Iran
- Province: Razavi Khorasan
- County: Torqabeh and Shandiz
- District: Shandiz
- Rural District: Shandiz

Population (2016)
  - Total: 1,627
- Time zone: UTC+3:30 (IRST)

Hesar-e Sorkh (Persian: حصارسرخ) (Note: Also romanized as Ḩeşār Sorkh and Ḩeşār-e Sorkh) is a village in Shandiz Rural District of Shandiz District in Torqabeh and Shandiz County, (Note: Formerly Binalud County) Razavi Khorasan province, Iran.

== Demographics ==
=== Population ===
At the time of the 2006 National Census, the village's population was 937 in 245 households, when it was in Torqabeh District of Mashhad County. The following census in 2011 counted 1,570 people in 455 households, by which time the district had been separated from the county in the establishment of Binalud County. (Note: Renamed Torqabeh and Shandiz County) The rural district was transferred to the new Shandiz District. The 2016 census measured the population of the village as 1,627 people in 501 households.
