= Deh Bar, Razavi Khorasan =

Village in Razavi Khorasan province, Iran

Deh Bar Persian: دهبار
- Village
- Location within Iran
- Coordinates: 36°15′03″N 59°17′18″E
- Country: Iran
- Province: Razavi Khorasan
- County: Torqabeh and Shandiz
- District: Torqabeh
- Rural District: Jagharq

Population (2016)
  - Total: 393
- Time zone: UTC+3:30 (IRST)

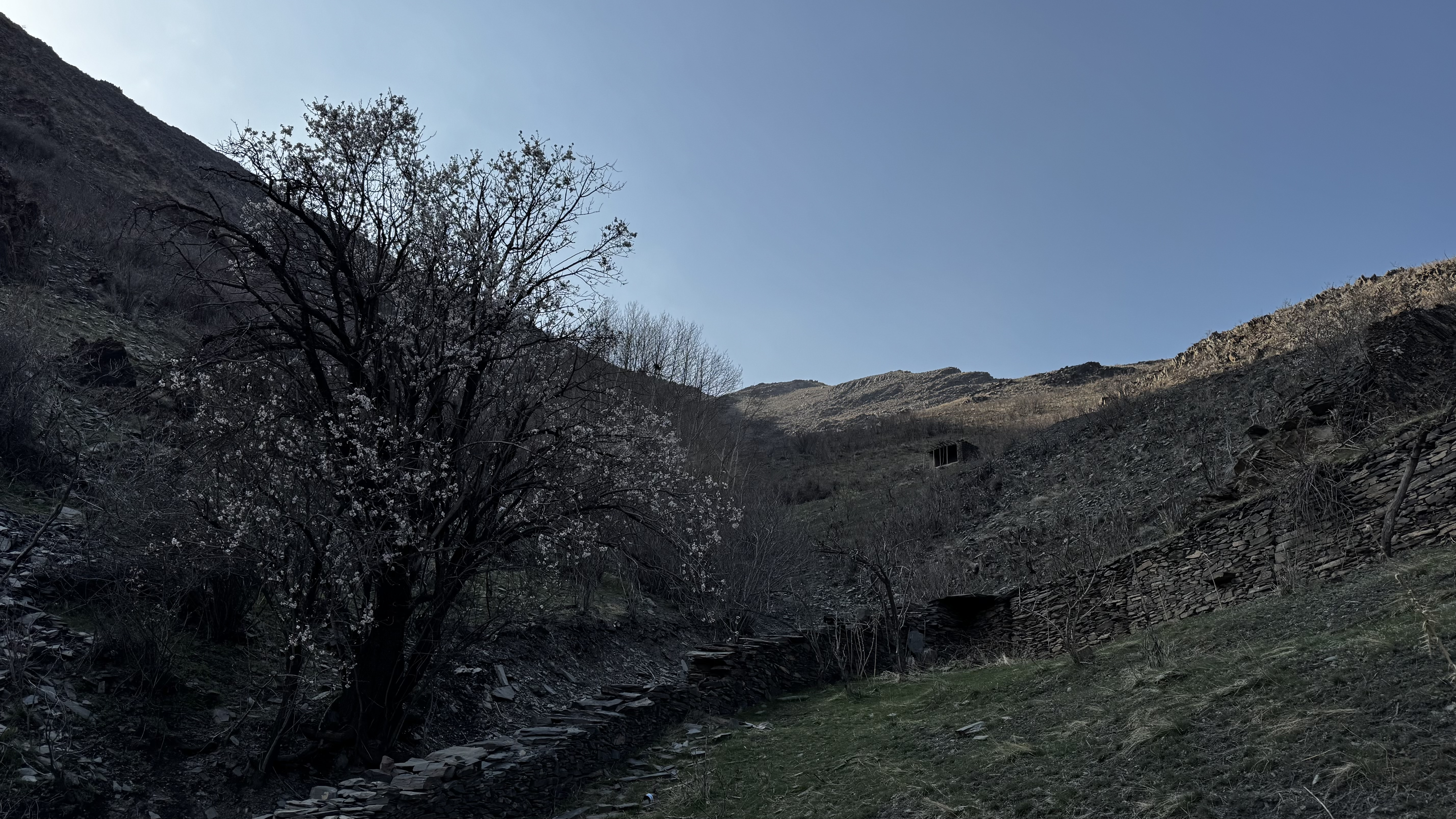
Dehbar, a village in Razavi Khorasan, 26 km from Mashhad, has fruit gardens and a 620-year-old plane tree

Deh Bar (Persian: دهبار) (Note: Also romanized as Dahbār, Deh Bār, and Dehbār) is a village in Jagharq Rural District of Torqabeh District in Torqabeh and Shandiz County, (Note: Formerly Binalud County) Razavi Khorasan province, Iran.

== Demographics ==
=== Population ===
At the time of the 2006 National Census, the village's population was 454 in 124 households, when it was in Torqabeh Rural District of Mashhad County. The following census in 2011 counted 382 people in 114 households, by which time the district had been separated from the county in the establishment of Binalud County. (Note: Renamed Torqabeh and Shandiz County) Deh Bar was transferred to Jagharq Rural District created in the same district. The 2016 census measured the population of the village as 393 people in 129 households.
