= Zoshk =

Village in Razavi Khorasan province, Iran

Zoshk Persian: زشك
- Village
- Location within Iran
- Coordinates: 36°20′11″N 59°11′57″E
- Country: Iran
- Province: Razavi Khorasan
- County: Torqabeh and Shandiz
- District: Shandiz
- Rural District: Abardeh

Population (2016)
  - Total: 1,836
- Time zone: UTC+3:30 (IRST)

Zoshk (Persian: زشك) (Note: Also known as Zoshg) is a village in Abardeh Rural District of Shandiz District in Torqabeh and Shandiz County, (Note: Formerly Binalud County) Razavi Khorasan province, Iran.

== Demographics ==
=== Population ===
At the time of the 2006 National Census, the village's population was 2,171 in 535 households, when it was in Shandiz Rural District of Torqabeh District in Mashhad County. The following census in 2011 counted 2,984 people in 808 households, by which time the district had been separated from the county in the establishment of Binalud County. (Note: Renamed Torqabeh and Shandiz County) The rural district was transferred to the new Shandiz District, and Zoshk was transferred to Abardeh Rural District created in the same district. The 2016 census measured the population of the village as 1,836 people in 582 households.
