= Abardeh-ye Olya =

Village in Razavi Khorasan province, Iran

Abardeh-ye Olya Persian: ابرده عليا
- Village
- Location within Iran
- Coordinates: 36°23′17″N 59°15′59″E
- Country: Iran
- Province: Razavi Khorasan
- County: Torqabeh and Shandiz
- District: Shandiz
- Rural District: Abardeh

Population (2016)
  - Total: 3,177
- Time zone: UTC+3:30 (IRST)

Abardeh-ye Olya (Persian: ابرده عليا) (Note: Also romanized as Abardeh ‘Olyā and Abardeh-ye ‘Olyā; also known as Abar Deh-e Bālā, Abardeh, and Abardeh-ye Bālā) is a village in, and the capital of, Abardeh Rural District in Shandiz District of Torqabeh and Shandiz County, (Note: Formerly Binalud County) Razavi Khorasan province, Iran.

== Demographics ==
=== Population ===
At the time of the 2006 National Census, the village's population was 2,152 in 630 households, when it was in Shandiz Rural District of Torqabeh District in Mashhad County. The following census in 2011 counted 3,553 people in 1,078 households, by which time the district had been separated from the county in the establishment of Binalud County. (Note: Renamed Torqabeh and Shandiz County) The rural district was transferred to the new Shandiz District, and Abardeh-ye Olya was transferred to Abardeh Rural District created in the same district. The 2016 census measured the population of the village as 3,177 people in 1,004 households, the most populous in its rural district.
