= Jagharq =

Village in Razavi Khorasan province, Iran

Jagharq Persian: جاغرق
- Village
- Location within Iran
- Coordinates: 36°18′44″N 59°19′17″E
- Country: Iran
- Province: Razavi Khorasan
- County: Torqabeh and Shandiz
- District: Torqabeh
- Rural District: Jagharq

Population (2016)
  - Total: 2,412
- Time zone: UTC+3:30 (IRST)

Jagharq (Persian: جاغرق) (Note: Also romanized as Jā Gharq and Jāgharq; also known as Jāgharg and Jāqarq) is a village in, and the capital of, Jagharq Rural District in Torqabeh District of Torqabeh and Shandiz County, (Note: Formerly Binalud County) Razavi Khorasan province, Iran.

== Demographics ==
=== Population ===
At the time of the 2006 National Census, the village's population was 2,044 in 542 households, when it was in Torqabeh Rural District of Mashhad County. The following census in 2011 counted 2,459 people in 767 households, by which time the district had been separated from the county in the establishment of Binalud County. (Note: Renamed Torqabeh and Shandiz County) Jagharq was transferred to Jagharq Rural District created in the same district. The 2016 census measured the population of the village as 2,412 people in 761 households, the most populous in its rural district.
