= Mahalleh =

Mahalleh (Arabic: محله) may refer to:

- Mahalleh-ye Akbari, Fars province
- Mahalleh-ye Now, Hormozgan province
- Mahalleh, Mazandaran, Mazandaran province
- Mahalleh Kola, Mazandaran province
- Mahalleh-ye Zoshk-e Olya, Razavi Khorasan province
- Mahalleh-ye Zoshk-e Sofla, Razavi Khorasan province
- Mahalleh-ye Baghel, Yazd province

== See also ==
- Mahalleh is a common element in Iranian place names; see
