= Sar Asiab, Torqabeh and Shandiz =

Village in Razavi Khorasan province, Iran

Sar Asiab Persian: سراسياب
- Village
- Location within Iran
- Coordinates: 36°23′59″N 59°20′14″E
- Country: Iran
- Province: Razavi Khorasan
- County: Torqabeh and Shandiz
- District: Shandiz
- Rural District: Shandiz

Population (2016)
  - Total: 1,439
- Time zone: UTC+3:30 (IRST)

Sar Asiab (Persian: سراسياب) (Note: Also romanized as Sar Āsīāb and Sarāseyāb) is a village in Shandiz Rural District of Shandiz District in Torqabeh and Shandiz County, (Note: Formerly Binalud County) Razavi Khorasan province, Iran.

== Demographics ==
=== Population ===
At the time of the 2006 National Census, the village's population was 1,453 in 374 households, when it was in Torqabeh District of Mashhad County. The following census in 2011 counted 1,588 people in 445 households, by which time the district had been separated from the county in the establishment of Binalud County. (Note: Renamed Torqabeh and Shandiz County) The rural district was transferred to the new Shandiz District. The 2016 census measured the population of the village as 1,439 people in 437 households.
