= Virani, Iran =

Village in Razavi Khorasan province, Iran

Virani Persian: ويراني
- Village
- Location within Iran
- Coordinates: 36°24′05″N 59°23′26″E
- Country: Iran
- Province: Razavi Khorasan
- County: Torqabeh and Shandiz
- District: Shandiz
- Rural District: Shandiz

Population (2016)
  - Total: 4,698
- Demonym: Viranichi (ویرانیچی)
- Time zone: UTC+3:30 (IRST)

Virani (Persian: ويراني) (Note: Also romanized as Veyrānī, Vīrānī, and Wīrāni; also known as Nūrābād (نوراباد)) is a village in Shandiz Rural District of Shandiz District in Torqabeh and Shandiz County, (Note: Formerly Binalud County) Razavi Khorasan province, Iran.

== Demographics ==
=== Population ===
At the time of the 2006 National Census, the village's population was 2,784 in 741 households, when it was in Torqabeh District of Mashhad County. The following census in 2011 counted 4,065 people in 1,135 households, by which time the district had been separated from the county in the establishment of Binalud County. (Note: Renamed Torqabeh and Shandiz County) The rural district was transferred to the new Shandiz District. The 2016 census measured the population of the village as 4,698 people in 1,353 households, the most populous in its rural district.
