= Kardineh =

Village in Razavi Khorasan province, Iran

Kardineh Persian: کردينه
- Village
- Location within Iran
- Coordinates: 36°16′06″N 59°15′08″E
- Country: Iran
- Province: Razavi Khorasan
- County: Torqabeh and Shandiz
- District: Torqabeh
- Rural District: Jagharq

Population (2016)
  - Total: 157
- Time zone: UTC+3:30 (IRST)

Kardineh (Persian: کردينه) (Note: Also romanized as Kardīneh) is a village in Jagharq Rural District of Torqabeh District in Torqabeh and Shandiz County, (Note: Formerly Binalud County) Razavi Khorasan province, Iran.

== Demographics ==
=== Population ===
The village did not appear in the 2006 National Census, when it was in Torqabeh Rural District of Mashhad County. The village again did not appear in following census of 2011, by which time the district had been separated from the county in the establishment of Binalud County. (Note: Renamed Torqabeh and Shandiz County) Kardineh was transferred to Jagharq Rural District created in the same district. The 2016 census measured the population of the village as 157 people in 55 households.
