= Mahalleh-ye Zoshk-e Sofla =

Village in Razavi Khorasan province, Iran

Mahalleh-ye Zoshk-e Sofla Persian: محله زشك سفلي
- Village
- Location within Iran
- Coordinates: 36°22′46″N 59°08′58″E
- Country: Iran
- Province: Razavi Khorasan
- County: Torqabeh and Shandiz
- District: Shandiz
- Rural District: Abardeh

Population (2016)
  - Total: 157
- Time zone: UTC+3:30 (IRST)

Mahalleh-ye Zoshk-e Sofla (Persian: محله زشك سفلي) (Note: Also romanized as Maḩalleh-ye Zoshk-e Soflá; also known as Mahalleh-ye Zoshk-e Pā‘īn) is a village in Abardeh Rural District of Shandiz District in Torqabeh and Shandiz County, (Note: Formerly Binalud County) Razavi Khorasan province, Iran.

== Demographics ==
=== Population ===
At the time of the 2006 National Census, the village's population was 105 in 28 households, when it was in Shandiz Rural District of Torqabeh District in Mashhad County. The following census in 2011 counted 60 people in 20 households, by which time the district had been separated from the county in the establishment of Binalud County. (Note: Renamed Torqabeh and Shandiz County) The rural district was transferred to the new Shandiz District, and Mahalleh-ye Zoshk-e Sofla was transferred to Abardeh Rural District created in the same district. The 2016 census measured the population of the village as 157 people in 55 households.
