= Moghan, Torqabeh and Shandiz =

Village in Razavi Khorasan province, Iran

Moghan Persian: مغان
- Village
- Location within Iran
- Coordinates: 36°08′14″N 59°22′46″E
- Country: Iran
- Province: Razavi Khorasan
- County: Torqabeh and Shandiz
- District: Torqabeh
- Rural District: Torqabeh

Population (2016)
  - Total: 998
- Time zone: UTC+3:30 (IRST)

Moghan (Persian: مغان) (Note: Also romanized as Moghān; also known as Mochān and Moqān) is a village in Torqabeh Rural District of Torqabeh District in Torqabeh and Shandiz County, (Note: Formerly Binalud County) Razavi Khorasan province, Iran.

== Demographics ==
=== Population ===
At the time of the 2006 National Census, the village's population was 828 in 258 households, when it was in Mashhad County. The following census in 2011 counted 866 people in 267 households, by which time the district had been separated from the county in the establishment of Binalud County. (Note: Renamed Torqabeh and Shandiz County) The 2016 census measured the population of the village as 998 people in 318 households.
