= Azghad =

Village in Razavi Khorasan province, Iran

Azghad Persian: ازغد
- Village
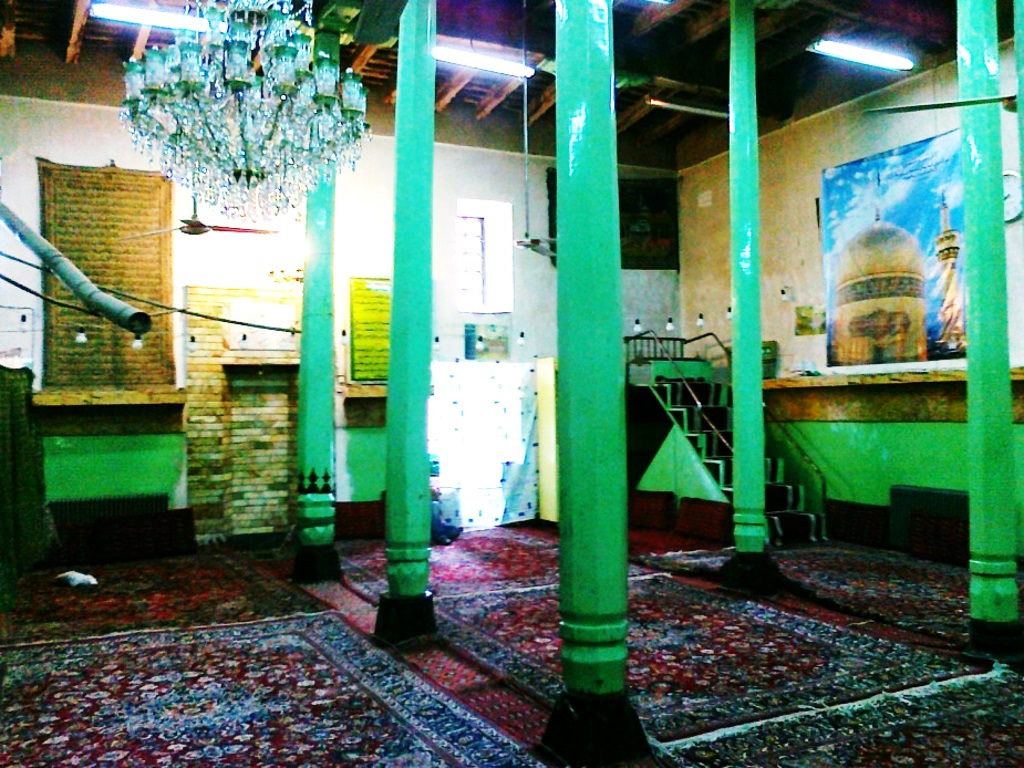
- Historical mosque of Azghad

- Location within Iran
- Coordinates: 36°11′59″N 59°20′19″E
- Country: Iran
- Province: Razavi Khorasan
- County: Torqabeh and Shandiz
- District: Torqabeh
- Rural District: Torqabeh

Population (2016)
  - Total: 500
- Time zone: UTC+3:30 (IRST)

Azghad (Persian: ازغد) (Note: Also known as Zeghey (زقی)) is a village in Torqabeh Rural District of Torqabeh District in Torqabeh and Shandiz County, (Note: Formerly Binalud County) Razavi Khorasan province, Iran.

== Demographics ==
=== Population ===
At the time of the 2006 National Census, the village's population was 447 in 140 households, when it was in Mashhad County. The following census in 2011 counted 532 people in 199 households, by which time the district had been separated from the county in the establishment of Binalud County. (Note: Renamed Torqabeh and Shandiz County) The 2016 census measured the population of the village as 500 people in 183 households.
