= Mahalleh-ye Zoshk-e Olya =

Village in Razavi Khorasan province, Iran

Mahalleh-ye Zoshk-e Olya Persian: محله زشك عليا
- Village
- Location within Iran
- Country: Iran
- Province: Razavi Khorasan
- County: Torqabeh and Shandiz
- District: Shandiz
- Rural District: Abardeh

Population (2016)
  - Total: 132
- Time zone: UTC+3:30 (IRST)

Mahalleh-ye Zoshk-e Olya (Persian: محله زشك عليا) (Note: Also romanized as Maḩalleh-ye Zoshk-e ‘Olyā; also known as Maḩalleh-ye Zoshk, Maḩalleh-ye Zoshk-e Bālā, and Mahalleh-ye Zoshke-e Bālā) is a village in Abardeh Rural District of Shandiz District in Torqabeh and Shandiz County, (Note: Formerly Binalud County) Razavi Khorasan province, Iran.

== Demographics ==
=== Population ===
At the time of the 2006 National Census, the village's population was 47 in 12 households, when it was in Shandiz Rural District of Torqabeh District in Mashhad County. The following census in 2011 counted 112 people in 35 households, by which time the district had been separated from the county in the establishment of Binalud County. (Note: Renamed Torqabeh and Shandiz County) The rural district was transferred to the new Shandiz District, and Mahalleh-ye Zoshk-e Olya was transferred to Abardeh Rural District created in the same district. The 2016 census measured the population of the village as 132 people in 40 households.
