= Mayan =

Mayan most commonly refers to:

- Maya peoples, various indigenous peoples of Mesoamerica and northern Central America
- Maya civilization, pre-Columbian culture of Mesoamerica and northern Central America
- Mayan languages, language family spoken in Mesoamerica and northern Central America
- Yucatec Maya language, language spoken in the Yucatán Peninsula and northern Belize

Mayan may also refer to:

- Mayan, Semnan, Iran
- Mayan stage, geological period that occurred during the end of the Middle Cambrian
- Mayan (band), a Dutch symphonic death-metal band
- Mayan (schooner), a 74-foot wooden sailboat designed by John Alden
- Mayan (software)

== See also ==
- List of Mayan languages
- Maya (disambiguation)
- Maayan (disambiguation)
- Mayana (disambiguation)
- Mayan Renaissance
- Mayan-e Olya, East Azerbaijan
- Mayan-e Olya, Razavi Khorasan
- Mayan-e Sofla, East Azerbaijan
- Mayan-e Sofla, Razavi Khorasan
- Mayan-e Vosta
- Mayian, the preparation ceremony one day before a Punjabi wedding
