= Kalateh-ye Derakht-e Bid =

Kalateh-ye Derakht-e Bid كلاته درخت بيد
- Village
- Country: Iran
- Province: Razavi Khorasan
- County: Torqabeh and Shandiz
- Bakhsh: Torqabeh
- Rural District: Torqabeh

Population (2006)
  - Total: 70
- Time zone: UTC+3:30 (IRST)
  - Summer (DST): UTC+4:30 (IRDT)

Kalateh-ye Derakht-e Bid (Persian: كلاته درخت بيد, also Romanized as Kalāteh-ye Derakht-e Bīd) is a village in Torqabeh Rural District, Torqabeh District, Torqabeh and Shandiz County, Razavi Khorasan Province, Iran. At the 2006 census, its population was 70, in 21 families.
