= Kalateh-ye Abdol, Torqabeh and Shandiz =

Village in Razavi Khorasan province, Iran

Kalateh-ye Abdol Persian: كلاته عبدل
- Village
- Location within Iran
- Coordinates: 36°20′48″N 59°23′37″E
- Country: Iran
- Province: Razavi Khorasan
- County: Torqabeh and Shandiz
- District: Torqabeh
- Rural District: Torqabeh

Population (2016)
  - Total: 322
- Time zone: UTC+3:30 (IRST)

Kalateh-ye Abdol (Persian: كلاته عبدل) (Note: Also romanized as Kalāteh-ye ‘Abdol) is a village in Torqabeh Rural District of Torqabeh District in Torqabeh and Shandiz County, (Note: Formerly Binalud County) Razavi Khorasan province, Iran.

== Demographics ==
=== Population ===
At the time of the 2006 National Census, the village's population was 59 in 20 households, when it was in Mashhad County. The following census in 2011 counted 253 people in 80 households, by which time the district had been separated from the county in the establishment of Binalud County. (Note: Renamed Torqabeh and Shandiz County) The 2016 census measured the population of the village as 322 people in 103 households.
