= Khadar, Razavi Khorasan =

Khadar خادر
- Village
- Location within Iran
- Coordinates: 36°23′20″N 59°18′02″E
- Country: Iran
- Province: Razavi Khorasan
- County: Torqabeh and Shandiz
- Bakhsh: Shandiz
- Rural District: Shandiz

Population (2006)
  - Total: 402
- Time zone: UTC+3:30 (IRST)
  - Summer (DST): UTC+4:30 (IRDT)

Khadar (Persian: خادر, also Romanized as Khādar) is a village in Shandiz Rural District, Shandiz District, Torqabeh and Shandiz County, Razavi Khorasan Province, Iran. At the 2006 census, its population was 402, in 121 families.
