= Shelgerd =

Shelgerd شلگرد
- Village
- Location within Iran
- Coordinates: 36°13′04″N 59°30′44″E
- Country: Iran
- Province: Razavi Khorasan
- County: Torqabeh and Shandiz
- Bakhsh: Torqabeh
- Rural District: Torqabeh

Population (2006)
  - Total: 97
- Time zone: UTC+3:30 (IRST)
  - Summer (DST): UTC+4:30 (IRDT)

Shelgerd (Persian: شلگرد, also Romanized as Shalgerd and Shalgird) is a village in Torqabeh Rural District, Torqabeh District, Torqabeh and Shandiz County, Razavi Khorasan Province, Iran. At the 2006 census, its population was 97, in 28 families.
