= Saqeshk =

Saqeshk ساقشك
- Village
- Location within Iran
- Coordinates: 36°25′58″N 59°17′59″E
- Country: Iran
- Province: Razavi Khorasan
- County: Torqabeh and Shandiz
- Bakhsh: Shandiz
- Rural District: Shandiz

Population (2006)
  - Total: 33
- Time zone: UTC+3:30 (IRST)
  - Summer (DST): UTC+4:30 (IRDT)

Saqeshk (Persian: ساقشك, also Romanized as Sāqeshk; also known as Sāgheshk, Sāqesh, Saqish, and Shākhshang) is a village in Shandiz Rural District, Shandiz District, Torqabeh and Shandiz County, Razavi Khorasan Province, Iran. At the 2006 census, its population was 33, in 11 families.
