= Kalateh-ye Ebrahimabad =

Kalateh-ye Ebrahimabad كلاته ابراهيم اباد
- Village
- Location within Iran
- Coordinates: 36°25′04″N 59°17′19″E
- Country: Iran
- Province: Razavi Khorasan
- County: Torqabeh and Shandiz
- Bakhsh: Shandiz
- Rural District: Shandiz

Population (2006)
  - Total: 203
- Time zone: UTC+3:30 (IRST)
  - Summer (DST): UTC+4:30 (IRDT)

Kalateh-ye Ebrahimabad (Persian: كلاته ابراهيم اباد, also Romanized as Kalāteh-ye Ebrāhīmābād; also known as Kalāteh-ye Ebrāhīm Khān) is a village in Shandiz Rural District, Shandiz District, Torqabeh and Shandiz County, Razavi Khorasan Province, Iran. At the 2006 census, its population was 203, in 48 families.
