= Khanrud =

Village in Razavi Khorasan province, Iran

Khanrud Persian: خانرود
- Village
- Location within Iran
- Coordinates: 36°08′23″N 59°24′11″E
- Country: Iran
- Province: Razavi Khorasan
- County: Torqabeh and Shandiz
- District: Torqabeh
- Rural District: Torqabeh

Population (2016)
  - Total: 403
- Time zone: UTC+3:30 (IRST)

Khanrud (Persian: خانرود) (Note: Also romanized as Khānrūd; also known as Eslām Rūd (اسلام رود)) is a village in Torqabeh Rural District of Torqabeh District in Torqabeh and Shandiz County, (Note: Formerly Binalud County) Razavi Khorasan province, Iran.

== Demographics ==
=== Population ===
At the time of the 2006 National Census, the village's population was 374 in 122 households, when it was in Mashhad County. The following census in 2011 counted 405 people in 142 households, by which time the district had been separated from the county in the establishment of Binalud County. (Note: Renamed Torqabeh and Shandiz County) The 2016 census measured the population of the village as 403 people in 128 households.
