= Maayan =

Maayan or Ma'ayan (Hebrew: מעיין) can refer to:

== Given name ==
- Maayan Amir (born 1978), artist and independent curator
- Maayan Davidovich (born 1988), Israeli Olympic windsurfer
- Maayan Furman-Shahaf (born 1986), Israeli high jumper and triple jumper
- Maayan Strauss (born 1982), Israeli artist
- Maayan Sheleff, Israeli independent curator and artist

== Surname ==
- Tom Maayan (born 1993), Israeli basketball player in the Israeli National League

== Places ==
- Ma'ayan Baruch, a kibbutz in northern Israel
- Ma'ayan Tzvi, a kibbutz in northern Israel

== Other ==
- Maayan (magazine), an Israeli magazine for poetry, literature, art, and ideas
- Maayan (film), a 2001 Tamil drama film
- Ma'ayan HaChinuch HaTorani, an education network in Israel

== See also ==
- Maya (disambiguation)
- Mayan (disambiguation)
