= Maya =

Maya may refer to:

== Ethnic groups ==
- Maya peoples, of southern Mexico and northern Central America
  - Maya civilization, the historical civilization of the Maya peoples
  - Mayan languages, the languages of the Maya peoples
- Maya (East Africa), a population native to the old Wej province in Ethiopia
- Sibuyanon, a Visayan population sometimes "May-" native to Sibuyan Island in the Philippines

== Religion and mythology ==
- Maya (religion), in Indian religions, relates to the illusion of reality
- Maya (mother of the Buddha) (died 563 BC), mother of the historical Buddha
- Mayasura or Maya, a Hindu demon
- Maya religion, the religious practices of the Maya peoples of parts of Mexico and Central America
  - Maya mythology, the myths and legends of the Maya civilization

== People ==
- Maya (given name), a feminine name (including a list of people and fictional characters with the name)

== Places ==
- Maya (Aldan), a river in Yakutia and the north of Khabarovsk Krai, Russia
- Maya (Uda), a river in Amur Oblast and central Khabarovsk Krai, Russia
- Maya, Uganda, a town
- Maya, Western Australia, a town
- Maya Karimata, an island in West Borneo, Indonesia
- Maya Mountains, a mountain range in Guatemala and Belize
  - Maya Biosphere Reserve, a nature reservation in Guatemala
- Mount Maya, a mountain in Kobe, Japan
  - Maya Station, a railway station in Kobe, Japan
- La Maya (mountain), an alp in Switzerland
- Al Maya or Maya, a town in Libya

== Military ==
- Japanese ships:
  - Japanese gunboat Maya, a Maya-class gunboat launched in 1886
  - Japanese cruiser Maya, a Takao-class cruiser launched in 1930
  - JS Maya, a Maya-class destroyer launched in 2018
- Aero L-29 Delfín, NATO reporting name Maya, a Czech military jet trainer aircraft
- Battle of Maya, an 1813 battle of the Peninsular War, between British and French forces

== Film and television ==
- Maya (1949 film), a French drama film directed by Raymond Bernard
- Maya (1961 film), an Indian Hindi film starring Dev Anand, Mala Sinha and Lalita Pawar
- Maya (1966 film), an American film starring Sajid Khan, Jay North, and Clint Walker
- Maya (1989 film), an Italian horror film by Marcello Avallone
- Maya (1999 film), an Indian trilingual film by Rama Narayanan
- Maya (2001 film), an Indian Hindi film by Digvijay Singh
- Maya (2015 Pakistani film), a horror film
- Maya (2015 Tamil film), an Indian Tamil-language horror film starring Nayanthara
- Maya (2018 film), a French film
- Maya (American TV series), an American television series and reboot of the 1966 film
- Maya (2012 TV series), an Indian medical soap opera television series
- Maya (2018 TV series), an Indian Tamil television series
- Maya (2026 TV series), a British thriller drama on Channel 4
- Maya the Honey Bee, a Japanese anime television series
- Maya the Bee (TV series), a French-German animated comedy television series
- Maya the Bee (film), a German-Australian animated comedy adventure film
- Maya the Bee: The Honey Games, an Australian–German animated comedy adventure film
- Maya the Bee: The Golden Orb, a German animated comedy adventure film
- Maya & Miguel, 2004 animated TV series
- Maya 3D, a 2016 Sri Lankan horror film
- "Maya" (Echo), an episode of Echo
- Maya TV, a television channel in Honduras

== Literature ==
- Maya (Surendran novel), by K. Surendran
- Maya (Campbell novel), 2010, by Alastair Campbell
- Maya, a 1999 book by Jostein Gaarder
- Maya the Bee, a 1912 children's book by Waldemar Bonsels

== Music ==
- Ang Maya (Kundiman song) (1908)
- Maya (Banco de Gaia album) (1994)
- Maya (Zubeen Garg album) (1994)
- Maya (Bipul Chettri album) (2016) or its title song
- Maya (Moheener Ghoraguli album) (1997)
- Maya (M.I.A. album) (2010)
- Maya (John Frusciante album) (2020)
- "Maya", a 1968 song by the Incredible String Band from Wee Tam and the Big Huge

== Other uses ==
- Maya language (disambiguation)
- Maya (bird), a folk taxon for several bird species in the Philippines
- Maya (mobile payments), a financial services and digital payments company based in the Philippines
- Autodesk Maya, a computer program for creating 3D graphics
- C.D. Maya, a football club in El Salvador
- Mayapada Group, an Indonesian-based conglomerate
- Washburn Maya Signature Series, a series of six-string electric guitars created by Washburn Guitars
- Most Advanced Yet Acceptable, a product design principle associated with Form follows function

== See also ==
- Mayan (disambiguation)
- List of Mayan languages
- Mahamaya (disambiguation)
- Mayya (disambiguation)
- Maaya (disambiguation)
- Mayavi (disambiguation)
- Maia (disambiguation)
- Maja (disambiguation)
- Mayer (disambiguation)
- Muia (disambiguation)
- Mya (disambiguation)
