= Now Chah =

Now Chah or Nowchah (Persian: نوچاه) may refer to:

- Now Chah, Mashhad
- Nowchah, Torqabeh and Shandiz
