= Nowchah, Torqabeh and Shandiz =

Village in Razavi Khorasan province, Iran

Nowchah Persian: نوچاه
- Village
- Location within Iran
- Coordinates: 36°20′30″N 59°25′37″E
- Country: Iran
- Province: Razavi Khorasan
- County: Torqabeh and Shandiz
- District: Torqabeh
- Rural District: Torqabeh

Population (2016)
  - Total: 823
- Time zone: UTC+3:30 (IRST)

Nowchah (Persian: نوچاه) (Note: Also romanized as Nowchāh) is a village in Torqabeh Rural District of Torqabeh District in Torqabeh and Shandiz County, (Note: Formerly Binalud County) Razavi Khorasan province, Iran.

== Demographics ==
=== Population ===
At the time of the 2006 National Census, the village's population was 726 in 185 households, when it was in Mashhad County. The following census in 2011 counted 476 people in 139 households, by which time the district had been separated from the county in the establishment of Binalud County. (Note: Renamed Torqabeh and Shandiz County) The 2016 census measured the population of the village as 823 people in 265 households.
