= Mahalleh-ye Zoshk =

Mahalleh-ye Zoshk (Persian: محله زشك) may refer to:

- Mahalleh-ye Zoshk-e Olya
- Mahalleh-ye Zoshk-e Sofla
