= Vila Shahr, Razavi Khorasan =

Vila Shahr ويلاشهر
- Village
- Location within Iran
- Coordinates: 36°20′19″N 59°25′31″E
- Country: Iran
- Province: Razavi Khorasan
- County: Torqabeh and Shandiz
- Bakhsh: Torqabeh
- Rural District: Torqabeh

Population (2006)
  - Total: 1,499
- Time zone: UTC+3:30 (IRST)
  - Summer (DST): UTC+4:30 (IRDT)

Vila Shahr (Persian: ويلاشهر, also Romanized as Vīlā Shahr) is a village in Torqabeh Rural District, Torqabeh District, Torqabeh and Shandiz County, Razavi Khorasan Province, Iran. At the 2006 census, its population was 1,499, in 381 families.
