= Astragalus zoshkensis =

Scientific classification
- Kingdom: Plantae
- Clade: Tracheophytes
- Clade: Angiosperms
- Clade: Eudicots
- Clade: Rosids
- Order: Fabales
- Family: Fabaceae
- Subfamily: Faboideae
- Genus: Astragalus
- Species: A. zoshkensis

Binomial name
- Astragalus zoshkensis Ghahr.-Nejad

Species of flowering plant

Astragalus zoshkensis is a species of flowering plant in the family Fabaceae. It is a subshrub.

The species is native to the temperate biome of north-eastern Iran. The type locality is Mashhad County, Iran.

Astragalus zoshkensis was described in 2003, from a type specimen collected in 2001. It is named for the village of Zoshk.
