= Sar Borj, Torqabeh and Shandiz =

Sar Borj سربرج
- Village
- Location within Iran
- Coordinates: 36°10′27″N 59°25′29″E
- Country: Iran
- Province: Razavi Khorasan
- County: Torqabeh and Shandiz
- Bakhsh: Torqabeh
- Rural District: Torqabeh

Population (2006)
  - Total: 175
- Time zone: UTC+3:30 (IRST)
  - Summer (DST): UTC+4:30 (IRDT)

Sar Borj (Persian: سربرج; also known as Sard Borj) is a village in Torqabeh Rural District, Torqabeh District, Torqabeh and Shandiz County, Razavi Khorasan Province, Iran. At the 2006 census, its population was 175, in 44 families.
