= Cheshmeh Puneh =

Cheshmeh Puneh (Persian: چشمه پونه) may refer to:

- Cheshmeh Puneh, Kermanshah
- Cheshmeh Puneh, Razavi Khorasan
