= Mayan-e Vosta =

Village in Razavi Khorasan province, Iran

Mayan-e Vosta Persian: مایان وسطی
- Village
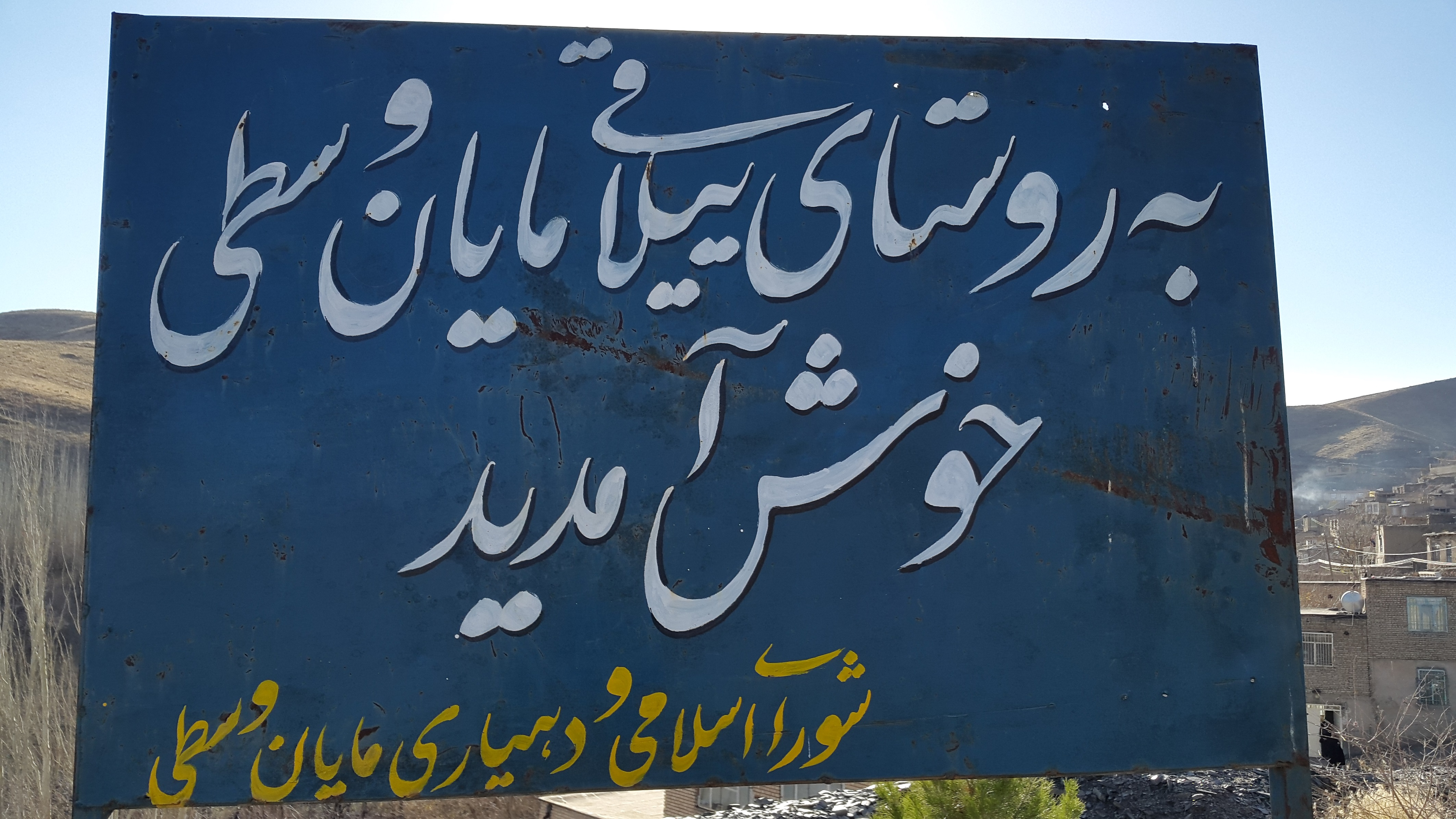
- Entrance sign to the village of Mayan-e Vosta

- Location within Iran
- Coordinates: 36°14′45″N 59°23′48″E
- Country: Iran
- Province: Razavi Khorasan
- County: Torqabeh and Shandiz
- District: Torqabeh
- Rural District: Torqabeh

Population (2016)
  - Total: 325
- Time zone: UTC+3:30 (IRST)

Mayan-e Vosta (Persian: مایان وسطی) (Note: Also romanized as Māyān-e Vosţá) is a village in Torqabeh Rural District of Torqabeh District in Torqabeh and Shandiz County, (Note: Formerly Binalud County) Razavi Khorasan province, Iran.

== Demographics ==
=== Population ===
At the time of the 2006 National Census, the village's population was 268 in 66 households, when it was in Mashhad County. The following census in 2011 counted 240 people in 59 households, by which time the district had been separated from the county in the establishment of Binalud County. (Note: Renamed Torqabeh and Shandiz County) The 2016 census measured the population of the village as 325 people in 85 households.
