= Ardameh, Torqabeh and Shandiz =

Ardameh اردمه
- Village
- Location within Iran
- Coordinates: 36°08′45″N 59°26′29″E
- Country: Iran
- Province: Razavi Khorasan
- County: Torqabeh and Shandiz
- Bakhsh: Torqabeh
- Rural District: Torqabeh

Population (2006)
  - Total: 152
- Time zone: UTC+3:30 (IRST)
  - Summer (DST): UTC+4:30 (IRDT)

Ardameh (Persian: اردمه, also Romanized as Ārdameh) is a village in Torqabeh Rural District, Torqabeh District, Torqabeh and Shandiz County, Razavi Khorasan Province, Iran. At the 2006 census, its population was 152, in 54 families.

== See also ==
- List of cities, towns and villages in Razavi Khorasan Province
