= Tajar, Iran =

Iranian village in Razavi Khorasan

Tajar تجر
- Village
- Location within Iran
- Coordinates: 36°10′24″N 59°23′31″E
- Country: Iran
- Province: Razavi Khorasan
- County: Torqabeh and Shandiz
- Bakhsh: Torqabeh
- Rural District: Torqabeh

Population (2006)
  - Total: 167
- Time zone: UTC+3:30 (IRST)
  - Summer (DST): UTC+4:30 (IRDT)

Tajar (Persian: تجر) is a village in Torqabeh Rural District, Torqabeh District, Torqabeh and Shandiz County, Razavi Khorasan Province, Iran. At the 2006 census, its population was 167, in 53 families.
