= Cheshmeh Puneh, Razavi Khorasan =

Cheshmeh Puneh چشمه پونه
- Village
- Location within Iran
- Coordinates: 36°15′47″N 59°33′08″E
- Country: Iran
- Province: Razavi Khorasan
- County: Torqabeh and Shandiz
- Bakhsh: Torqabeh
- Rural District: Torqabeh

Population (2006)
  - Total: 254
- Time zone: UTC+3:30 (IRST)
  - Summer (DST): UTC+4:30 (IRDT)

Cheshmeh Puneh (Persian: چشمه پونه, also Romanized as Cheshmeh Pūneh) is a village in Torqabeh Rural District, Torqabeh District, Torqabeh and Shandiz County, Razavi Khorasan Province, Iran. At the 2006 census, its population was 254, in 66 families.
