= Abardeh =

Abardeh or Abar Deh (Persian: ابرده) may refer to:

- Abardeh-ye Olya
- Abardeh-ye Sofla
