= Abardeh Rural District =

Rural district in Razavi Khorasan province, Iran

Abardeh Rural District Persian: دهستان ابرده
- Rural District
- Location within Iran
- Coordinates: 36°21′N 59°11′E
- Country: Iran
- Province: Razavi Khorasan
- County: Torqabeh and Shandiz
- District: Shandiz
- Established: 2007
- Capital: Abardeh-ye Olya

Population (2016)
  - Total: 6,614
- Time zone: UTC+3:30 (IRST)

Abardeh Rural District (Persian: دهستان ابرده) is in Shandiz District of Torqabeh and Shandiz County, (Note: Formerly Binalud County) Razavi Khorasan province, Iran. Its capital is the village of Abardeh-ye Olya.

== History ==
In 2007, Torqabeh District was separated from Mashhad County in the establishment of Binalud County, (Note: Renamed Torqabeh and Shandiz County) and Abardeh Rural District was created in the new Shandiz District.

== Demographics ==
=== Population ===
At the time of the 2011 National Census, the rural district's population was 7,866 in 2,318 households. The 2016 census measured the population of the rural district as 6,614 in 2,127 households. The most populous of its nine villages was Abardeh-ye Olya, with 3,177 people.

=== Other villages in the rural district ===
- Abardeh-ye Sofla
- Gorakhk
- Kalateh-ye Mown
- Mahalleh-ye Zoshk-e Olya
- Mahalleh-ye Zoshk-e Sofla
- Zoshk
