= Tajar =

Tajar may refer to:

- Spanish and Venetan language word for the act of cutting
- Tajar, Iran, village in Razavi Khorasan province, Iran
- Alor Tajar, also known as "Tajar", subdistrict of Kota Sedar District, Kedah, Malaysia
- Tajar Tetova, Albanian military commander
- Tajar Zavalani, Albanian historian, publicist, and writer

== See also ==
- Huétor-Tájar, town in Granada, Spain
