= Maaya =

Maaya may refer to:

- Maaya (given name), a feminine Japanese given name
- Maaya (1972 film), an Indian Malayalam film
- Maaya (2014 film), an Indian Telugu film

== See also ==
- Maya (disambiguation)
