= Najafi =

Najafi may refer to:

- Najafi (surname)
- Najafi, Iran, a village
- Najaf Qoli, Lorestan, a village
