= Vilashahr =

Vilashahr or Vila Shahr (Persian: ويلاشهر) may refer to:

- Vilashahr, Isfahan
- Vila Shahr, GOLESTAN
- Vila Shahr, Razavi Khorasan
