= Mandip Singh Soin =

Indian explorer and mountaineer

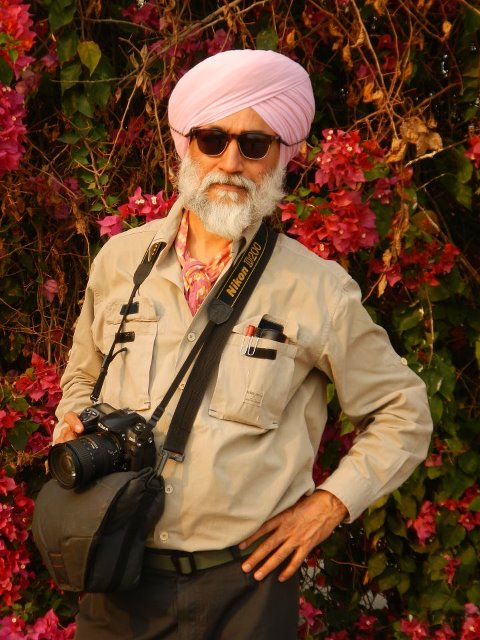

Mandip Singh Soin FRGS (born 9 March 1957) is a prominent Indian mountaineer, explorer, adventure travel expert, environmentalist, speaker and a Fellow of the Royal Geographical Society. He has spent over fifty years in the field of adventure, having gone on expeditions to all the seven continents of the world. His mountaineering ascents and explorations include several Indian “firsts” like the first Indian ascent of Mount Meru in 1986 in the Himalayas as well as several first Indian ascents in the French and Swiss Alps, Italian Dolomites, Wales and Scotland. He is a strong advocate of responsible tourism and the Founder President of the erstwhile Ecotourism Society of India (now the Responsible Tourism Society of India).

== Adventurer and explorer ==
At 14, Mandip started participating in climbing expeditions while he was studying at The Air Force School under Hari Dang, a well known educationist and a mountaineer. Mandip’s own first big climb was the Kuari Pass Trek, made famous by the likes of Lord Curzon, Bill Tilman and Eric Shipton at the turn of the 20th century, which he took on as a schoolboy in 1972. He would go on to win the 'Rock Gibbon’ award for rock climbing at The Air Force School, 1973.

Later while studying at St. Stephen's College, Delhi and during his early climbing years, he started playing an activist’s role for several environmental causes along with his expeditions.

In 1979, he co-founded a national and international award-winning travel company, Ibex Expeditions Pvt. Ltd, offering adventure & safari travels in India and later also to the more discerning parts of the world. Through Ibex Expeditions, Mandip pioneered several unique journeys, such as the now famous frozen river (Chadar) trek on the Zanskar river in 1994, which paved the way for winter tourism in Ladakh and many more.

In 1988, he along with two team members, undertook a Mountain Rescue training project in North Wales, Scotland and Chamonix, under the aegis of an INLAKS Foundation grant. His team established a project called HELP (Himalayan Evacuation and Lifesaving Project) and Sir Edmund Hillary was patron of the project which helped reinforce Rescue systems in the Indian Himalaya.

He also undertook a cycling expedition from Delhi to Kathmandu in 1981. Led the first crossing on camel back of the Indian Thar desert from Jaisalmer to the Rann of Kutch in 1986, and the first elephant back expedition in the jungles of Kerala in 1990.

In 1992, he became the first Indian to be conferred the Ness Award for expeditions and exploration by the Royal Geography Society, UK.

In 1992, he was also nominated ‘Person of the Year’ and 'India's Most Versatile Adventurer' by Limca Book of Records

In 2012, he was conferred the highest civilian honor in India for Adventure by the President of India – the Tenzing Norgay National Adventure Award for Lifetime Achievement.

In 2015, he became the only Indian to be honored by the “Citation of Merit” from the famous Explorers’ Club, USA, at the 111th Explorers’ Club Annual Dinner.

== Environmentalist ==
Mandip has campaigned for the cause of environmental protection with concern for forests, wildlife, nature, communities and sustainable tourism in India. He is the Honorary Founder President of the former Ecotourism Society of India (now the Responsible Tourism Society of India, better known as RTSOI), and former member of international committees such as the Pacific Asia Travel Association, Member of the World Travel Market Responsible Tourism Day's advisory panel and a Trustee of the Himalayan Environment Trust.

Over the last fifty years, he has visited over 50 National Parks and sanctuaries all over India, Sri Lanka, South Africa etc. to assess the ecotourism potential and lay out strategies for the Government of India and the tourism industry in India and worldwide. For example, the travel ban on the fragile and precious Nicobar Islands in the Bay of Bengal, home to the Nicobarese tribe and the reclusive Shompen, came out of his team’s recommendation to the Indian government after an exploratory trip in 2003 — and Soin has continued to urge the government and private tour operators alike to "do the right thing for sustainable tourism" in the Andaman and Nicobar Islands (particularly in light of the new Great Nicobar Island Development Project) and in Lakshadweep as well.

As Chairman of Pacific Asia Travel Association India Chapter's Environment & Ecotourism Committee, Soin was successful in getting the Indian travel industry to sign an environmental pledge in 1992.

Soin has also been a member of the jury for the tiger conservation awards instituted by the Pacific Asia Travel Association (PATA) and WWF-India and has served as a judge for the Tourism for Tomorrow Award for the World Tourism and Travel Council for over 15 years.

Sitting on the governing council of the Responsible Tourism Society of India, which has an MOU with the Government of India and the UNEP, Soin also travels the world to lecture on sustainable travel and tourism.

Of late, he has been campaigning for global agreement on the protection of Antarctica through the international citizens' campaign #AntarcticaMatters, ahead of the resetting of terms for the Antarctic Treaty in 2048. Soin launched the initiative while on an Antarctica expedition in 2017, leading 30 travellers.

== Expeditions ==
- All India Rock Climbing Expedition, 1984.
- Led first crossing of the Thar desert on camel back, 1986.
- Member of the first Indian ascent of Mt Meru in the Garhwal Himalaya, 1986.
- Led first Elephant Expedition, Kerala, 1990.
- Led Indo British Frozen River Zanskar & Winter Expedition with Lord John Hunt as Patron, 1994. The expedition was awarded the Explorer's Club Flag and opened Tourism in winter for Ladakh.
- International Friendship Expedition: Indo Pakistan Friendship Expedition, in the Swiss Alps under the aegis of the World Conservation Union (IUCN) and the World Climbing & Mountaineering Federation (UIAA) 2002. Climbed Monch and championed the cause of creating the Siachen glacier between India and Pakistan, into a peace park.
- Led International Ecotourism & Volcano Expedition, Andaman and Nicobar Islands to present low impact tourism strategy as a sustainable option to the Government of India, 2003. This led to the presentation of a white paper on eco-sensitive tourism in the Andaman Islands to the government, which included the recommendation of keeping the Nicobar Islands closed to tourism—which was accepted and the Nicobar remains off-limits to tourists.
- Led a 2-week trip into the Borneo rainforest in December 2006, which included a climb up the highest mountain in South-East Asia – Mt Kinabalu (4095 meters) in Sabah, Borneo, and exploring the rain forests of Sukau, where he was able to study the orangutan and proboscis monkeys, before rafting down the Padas River.
- River Ecotourism Expedition on the Chambal River with the Madhya Pradesh Ecotourism Board to convert local bandits to Naturalists, 2007.
- Anniversary climbs in the Swiss Alps in 2007 in the Zermatt region and along the ‘Thermometer Egg’ route on the south face of the Riffelhorn, the Pigne de la Le, and the Allalinhorn to commemorate 60 years of India’s Independence, 75 years of the Himalayan Club, 125 years of St Stephen's College, Delhi, and 150 years of the Alpine Club of UK.
- Led a 2-week multi-adventure journey in Arunachal Pradesh in 2008, from Tawang in the East to Pasighat and beyond, trekking through tribal villages and rainforests and rafting down the Siang River.
- Led an 18-day expedition in Mongolia in 2009, designed to follow in the footsteps of Genghis Khan — on foot, on camel back and on horseback — through the Gobi Desert and the High Steppes of eastern Mongolia, including an ascent of the 1,686m Zorgol Hairhan in the Bayan-Onjuulsoun area of the Tuv province.
- Led a 15-day expedition on the Tsiribihina River in Madagascar in 2010 in the style of early explorers sailing out of Arabia – travelling by pirogue, exploring bat caves and climbing the jagged limestone pinnacles of the Tsingy de Bemaraha (a UNESCO World Heritage site), looking for endemic lemurs and chameleons, sailing a dhow off the Mozambique Channel.
- Led a 2-week Peru expedition in 2012, exploring the Amazon rainforest in Tambopata; trekking with the Andean community in the Sacred Valley; rafting the Vilcanota (Urubamba) River; visiting Machu Picchu and walking up the Huayna Picchu.
- Led a 10-day river rafting expedition over the grade 5 rapids of the Zanskar River in Ladakh, India, in 2013.
- Also in 2013, climbed ‘Big Daddy’, the second-highest dune in Namibia in October, followed by a wildlife safari from the Skeleton Coast to the Namib Desert.
- In November 2013, undertook a fortnight-long journey in Morocco, from the World Heritage Sites of Fez and Volubilis to traversing the Sahara desert on camelback, making an attempt on Mt Toubkal in the High Atlas Mountains, and going deep-sea fishing off the coast of Agadir in the Atlantic.
- Led a wildlife safari through the principal national parks of Namibia in June 2014 and studied their community-based conservation practices in Otjiwarongo, Etosha, Grootberg, Twyfelfontein, Swakopmund, and Walvis Bay, including tracking a rhino on foot.
- Led an adventure journey into Chile in 2015 to the Atacama Desert, hiking in Patagonia to the Torres del Paine and rafting the Petrohue river.
- Led a Trans-Siberian Express-themed trip from Moscow to Ulaanbaatar and to the southern Gobi Desert in Mongolia, looking for dinosaur eggs and climbing the highest dune in the Gobi desert in 2016.
- Led 30 explorers to the Antarctica Peninsula over two weeks in autumn 2017, hiking and travelling by Zodiac, and launching the #AntarcticaMatters initiative to help create awareness around the importance of protecting Antarctica as a neutral zone that serves no nation’s commercial or martial interests as the Antarctic Treaty System is due to evolve in 2048.
- Undertook a zip-wire descent and rafting expedition down the Juramento river in Salta, Argentina, in 2017.
- Visited Willpattu National Park in Sri Lanka in 2019, trekked the Horton Plains and rafted down the Kitulgala river.
- Conducted an overland safari across Ladakh, India, in 2021, travelling from Leh to Nubra and Pangong Tso.

== Awards ==
- The Duke of Edinburgh’s Award (gold), New Delhi, India,1979.
- 'India's Most Versatile Adventurer' by The Limca Book of Records 1992 and 2008.
- The Ness Award from the Royal Geographical Society, UK, in 1992 for Mountaineering, Polar expeditions & encouragement of Youth exploration.
- Best Green Leader, Pacific Asia Writers Association, London, UK, 2000.
- The International Institute for Peace Award for the Indo-Pakistan friendship expedition in the Swiss Alps 2002
- Awarded by Sir Edmund Hillary for his contribution to Himalayan Environment, India, 2003.
- Achievement Award from the International Institute for Peace through Tourism, Switzerland, 2003, after the Indo-Pakistan Peace Climb in the Swiss Alps as part of the Summit for Siachen.
- 'Arjuna Award of Adventure' – The Tenzing Norgay Lifetime Achievement National Award for Adventure 2012
- The Lifetime Achievement Award from the Adventure Tour Operators Association of India (ATOAI) in 2013.
- Citation of Merit by The Explorers Club, New York, USA, in March 2015.

== Appointments and memberships ==
- Founder President, The Ecotourism Society of India. (ESOI)
- Member, Board of Directors, Adventure Travel Conservation Fund (ATCF)
- Senior Vice-President, Adventure Tour Operators Association of India. (ATOAI)
- Trustee, Himalayan Environment Trust. (HET)
- Member, Judging Panel, Tourism for Tomorrow Awards, World Travel and Tourism Council
- Fellow, Royal Geographical Society, UK.
- Former Chairman, South Asia Chapter, Explorers Club USA
- Member, Indian Mountaineering Foundation (IMF)
- Member, Access & Conservation Committee, Union Internationale des Associations d'Alpinisme (UIAA)
- Member, International Committee of PATA for Sustainability and Social Responsibility.
