= Ardameh =

Ardameh (Persian: اردمه) may refer to:

- Ardameh, Miyan Jolgeh, Iran
- Ardameh, Torqabeh and Shandiz, Iran
