= Mayan-e Olya =

Mayan-e Olya (Persian: مايان عليا) may refer to:

- Mayan-e Olya, East Azerbaijan
- Mayan-e Olya, Razavi Khorasan
