= Mayan-e Olya, Razavi Khorasan =

Village in Razavi Khorasan province, Iran

Mayan-e Olya Persian: مایان علیا
- Village
- Location within Iran
- Coordinates: 36°13′00″N 59°22′22″E
- Country: Iran
- Province: Razavi Khorasan
- County: Torqabeh and Shandiz
- District: Torqabeh
- Rural District: Torqabeh

Population (2016)
  - Total: 329
- Time zone: UTC+3:30 (IRST)

Mayan-e Olya (Persian: مایان علیا) (Note: Also romanized as Māyān-e ‘Olyā) is a village in Torqabeh Rural District of Torqabeh District in Torqabeh and Shandiz County, (Note: Formerly Binalud County) Razavi Khorasan province, Iran.

== Demographics ==
=== Population ===
At the time of the 2006 National Census, the village's population was 293 in 82 households, when it was in Mashhad County. The following census in 2011 counted 340 people in 114 households, by which time the district had been separated from the county in the establishment of Binalud County. (Note: Renamed Torqabeh and Shandiz County) The 2016 census measured the population of the village as 329 people in 112 households.
