= Pigne de la Lé =

Mountain in Switzerland

- Location within Switzerland

Highest point
- Elevation: 3,396 m (11,142 ft)
- Prominence: 113 m (371 ft)
- Coordinates: 46°4′58″N 7°36′39″E

Geography
- Location: Valais, Switzerland
- Parent range: Pennine Alps

The Pigne de la Lé is a mountain of the Swiss Pennine Alps, located south of Zinal in the canton of Valais. It lies north of the Grand Cornier, on the range between the Moiry Glacier and the valley of Zinal.

== Access roads ==
To get there you will use the same road as in the case of the nearby Garde de Bordon and Sasseneire, from Sierre in the Rhone valley. This is the only access which will take you to the parking at the end of the road above the Moiry lake and at the altitude of 2350 m.

== Climbing Pigne de la Lé ==
The normal route starts at the mentioned parking. From there you will follow the signs toward the Moiry hut (2825 m). After the hut you can climb the mountain following the rocky ridge or the glacier route. The former is shorter and you will not need any special equipment in the summer time. The latter is a glacier route all the time.

== Other peaks to climb around ==
There are many peaks which you can climb once you are at the Moiry lake area. I would point out these:

- Garde de Bordon.
- Sasseneire.
- Becs de Bosson.

== Huts ==
- Moiry hut.
- Becs de Bosson hut.
