= Becs de Bosson =

Mountain in Switzerland

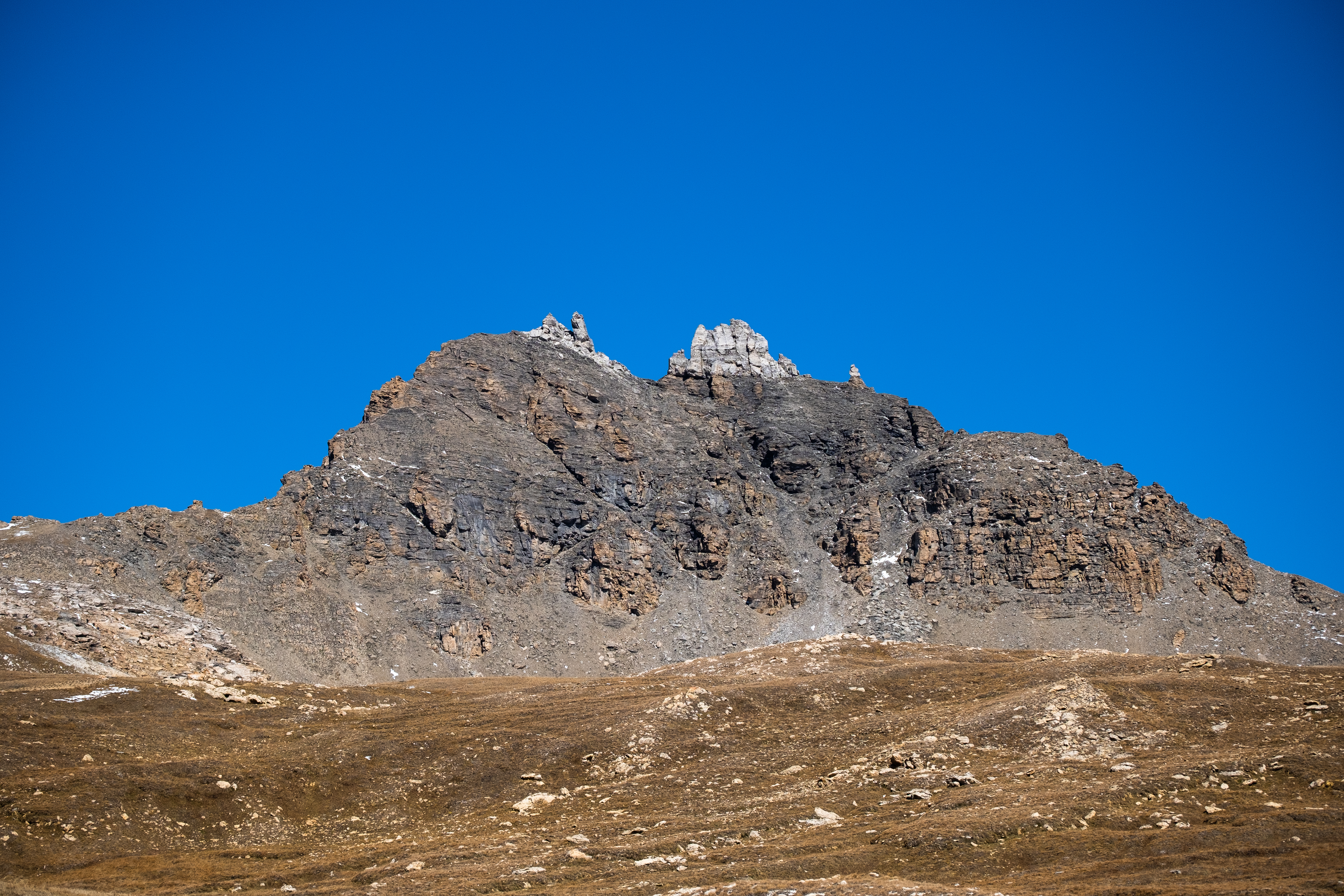
- From the Pas de Lona trail

Highest point
- Elevation: 3,149 m (10,331 ft)
- Prominence: 362 m (1,188 ft)
- Parent peak: Monte Rosa
- Listing: Alpine mountains above 3000 m
- Coordinates: 46°10′5″N 7°31′6″E

Geography
- Location within Switzerland
- Location: Valais, Switzerland
- Parent range: Pennine Alps

The Becs de Bosson are a multi-summited mountain of the Pennine Alps, located between St-Martin and Grimentz, in the canton of Valais.

== Access roads ==
There are two roads from the Rhone valley. One road is from Sierre towards the Moiry lake, the same you will use to climb Garde de Bordon, Sasseneire, and Pigne de la Le. The approach is from Sion to the Val d’Hérens.

== Getting to the summit ==
You have numerous routes from the nearby valleys in the east and in the west. They all lead towards Cabane Becs de Bosson which is at 2985 m above the sea level. The hut is directly under the summit. The most convenient approach is from the dam of the Moiry lake (2249 m) because of such a high access by car.

The final section of the route to the summit starts at Col des Becs de Bosson (2942 m). This part is a short rock scramble and with several exposed sections, not for beginners.
