= Sar Borj =

Sar Borj (Persian: سربرج) may refer to:

- Sar Borj, Bardaskan
- Sar Borj, Torqabeh and Shandiz
