= Jagharq Rural District =

Rural district in Razavi Khorasan province, Iran

Jagharq Rural District Persian: دهستان جاغرق
- Rural District
- Location within Iran
- Coordinates: 36°17′N 59°17′E
- Country: Iran
- Province: Razavi Khorasan
- County: Torqabeh and Shandiz
- District: Torqabeh
- Established: 2007
- Capital: Jagharq

Population (2016)
  - Total: 5,847
- Time zone: UTC+3:30 (IRST)

Jagharq Rural District (Persian: دهستان جاغرق) is in Torqabeh District of Torqabeh and Shandiz County, (Note: Formerly Binalud County) Razavi Khorasan province, Iran. Its capital is the village of Jagharq.

== History ==
In 2007, Torqabeh District was separated from Mashhad County in the establishment of Binalud County, (Note: Renamed Torqabeh and Shandiz County) and Jagharq Rural District was created in the same district.

== Demographics ==
=== Population ===
At the time of the 2011 National Census, the rural district's population was 4,755 in 1,481 households. The 2016 census measured the population of the rural district as 5,847 in 1,822 households. The most populous of its 10 villages was Jagharq, with 2,412 people.

=== Other villages in the rural district ===
- Deh Bar
- Kalateh-ye Ahan
- Kang
- Kardineh
- Noqondar
