= Mayana =

Mayana may refer to:

- Mayana, Iran, a village in Kermanshah Province, Iran
- Mayana Moura (b. 1982), Brazilian actress
- Mayana Zatz (b. 1947), Brazilian molecular biologist and geneticist
- Mayana (bug), a genus of true bug in family Oxycarenidae

== See also ==
- Mayan (disambiguation)
