= La Maya (mountain) =

Mountain in Switzerland

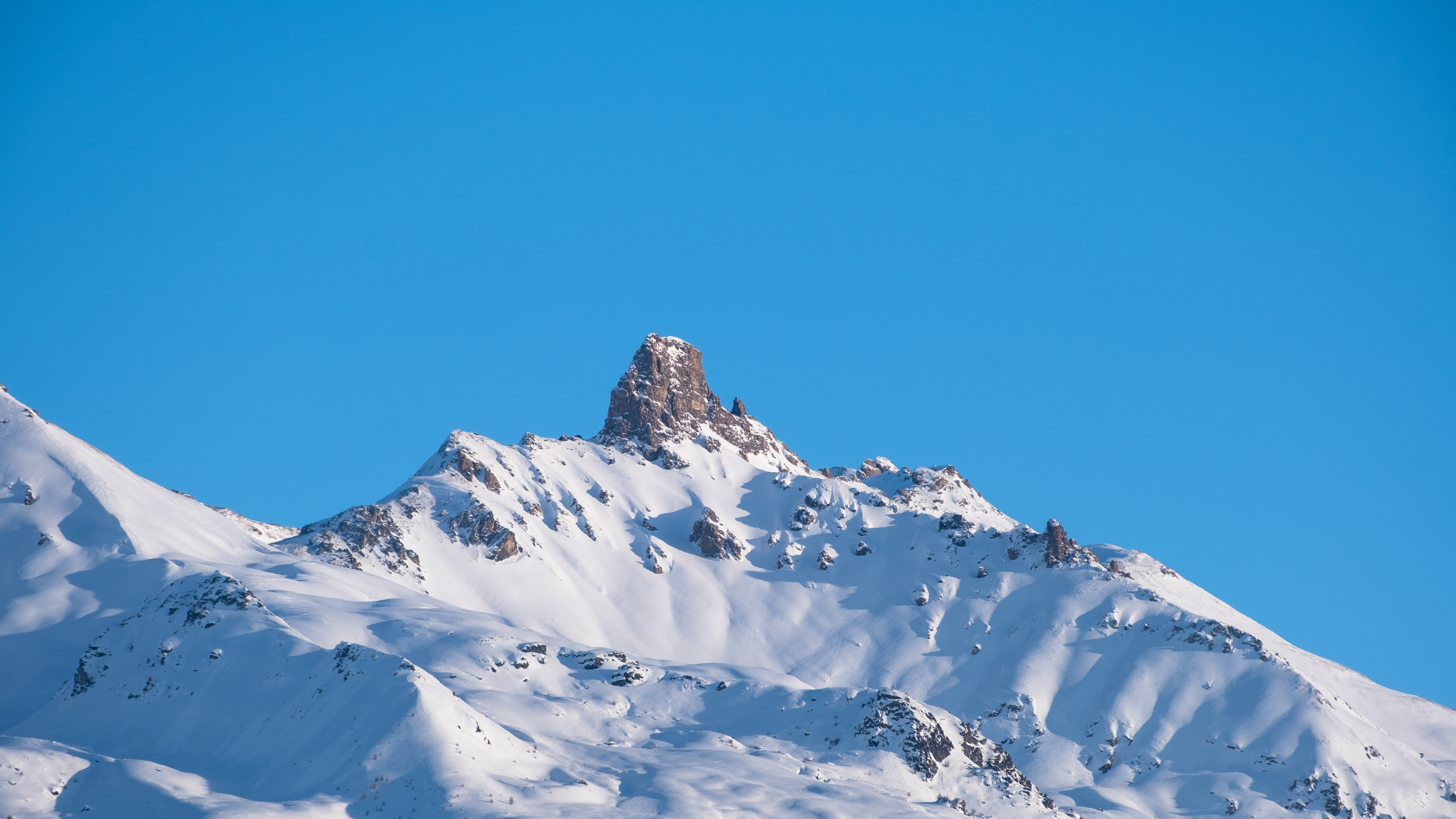
- La Maya from the Soie Castle

Highest point
- Elevation: 2,916 m (9,567 ft)
- Prominence: 96 m (315 ft)
- Parent peak: Becs de Bosson
- Coordinates: 46°10′18″N 7°29′30.2″E

Geography
- Location within Switzerland
- Location: Valais, Switzerland
- Parent range: Pennine Alps

La Maya is a mountain of the Pennine Alps, overlooking St-Martin in the canton of Valais. It lies between the Val d'Hérens and the Val de Réchy, west of the Becs de Bosson.
