= Mayya =

Mayya may refer to:

- "Mayya" (song), a Hindi song from the 2006 Indian film Guru
- Mayya (rural locality), a rural locality (a selo) in Megino-Kangalassky District of the Sakha Republic, Russia

== See also ==
- Maya (disambiguation)
