= Mahamaya (disambiguation) =

Mahamaya may refer to:

- Mahāmāyā Tantra, a Buddhist tantra
- Mahamaya (film), a 1944 Indian Tamil language film
- Mahamaya, Chhattisgarh, a small town in Durg district, Chhattisgarh, India
  - Mahamaya Temple, a Hindu temple in Chhattisgarh, India
- Mahamaya Chhara Irrigation Extension Project, an irrigation project in Bangladesh
- Mahamaya Dham, a Hindu temple in Assam, India
- Mahamaya Girls' College, Kandy, Sri Lanka
- Mahamaya Kalika Devasthan Kasarpal, a temple complex in Kasarpal, India

== See also ==
- Maha (disambiguation)
- Maya (disambiguation)
