= Mayavi (disambiguation) =

Mayavi is an Indian comics strip published in the Malayalam language.

Mayavi may also refer to:

- Mayavi (1965 film), an Indian Malayalam-language film
- Mayavi (2007 film), an Indian Malayalam-language film by Shafi
- Mayavi (TV series), a 2006–2007 Indian television series
- MayaVi, a scientific data visualizer written in Python

== See also ==
- Maya (disambiguation)
- Maayavi, a 2005 Indian Tamil-language film
- Maayavan, a 2017 Indian Tamil-language film
