= Now Chah, Mashhad =

Now Chah نوچاه
- Village
- Location within Iran
- Coordinates: 36°26′17″N 59°36′03″E
- Country: Iran
- Province: Razavi Khorasan
- County: Mashhad
- Bakhsh: Central
- Rural District: Tabadkan

Population (2006)
  - Total: 118
- Time zone: UTC+3:30 (IRST)
  - Summer (DST): UTC+4:30 (IRDT)

Now Chah (Persian: نوچاه, also Romanized as Now Chāh) is a village in Tabadkan Rural District, in the Central District of Mashhad County, Razavi Khorasan Province, Iran. At the 2006 census, its population was 118, in 31 families.
