= Maya language (disambiguation) =

A Mayan language is one of a group of languages spoken by the Mayan people of Mesoamerica.

Mayan language may also refer to:

== America ==
- Yucatec Maya language or Maya, a Mayan language spoken in the Yucatán Peninsula
- Maya script, ancient written Mayan
  - Mayan Numerals (Unicode block)

== Africa ==
- Maya language (Nigeria), a Niger-Congo language of Nigeria
- Yendang languages of eastern Nigeria, also called Maya languages

== Asia ==
- Maiya language, a Kohistani variety of Pakistan

== Papua ==
- Maia language, a Madang language of Papua New Guinea
- Ma'ya language, an Austronesian language of Southwest Papua, Indonesia

== Australia ==
- Badimaya language or Parti-Maya, an aboriginal language of Australia
- Mayi-Kutuna language, an aboriginal language of Australia

== Computers ==
- Maya Embedded Language, the language used in the Autodesk Maya software, also known as MEL

== See also ==
- Maya (disambiguation)
