= Torqabeh =

City in Razavi Khorasan province, Iran

Torqabeh Persian: طرقبه
- City
- Location within Iran
- Coordinates: 36°18′51″N 59°22′21″E
- Country: Iran
- Province: Razavi Khorasan
- County: Torqabeh and Shandiz
- District: Torqabeh

Population (2016)
  - Total: 20,998
- Time zone: UTC+3:30 (IRST)

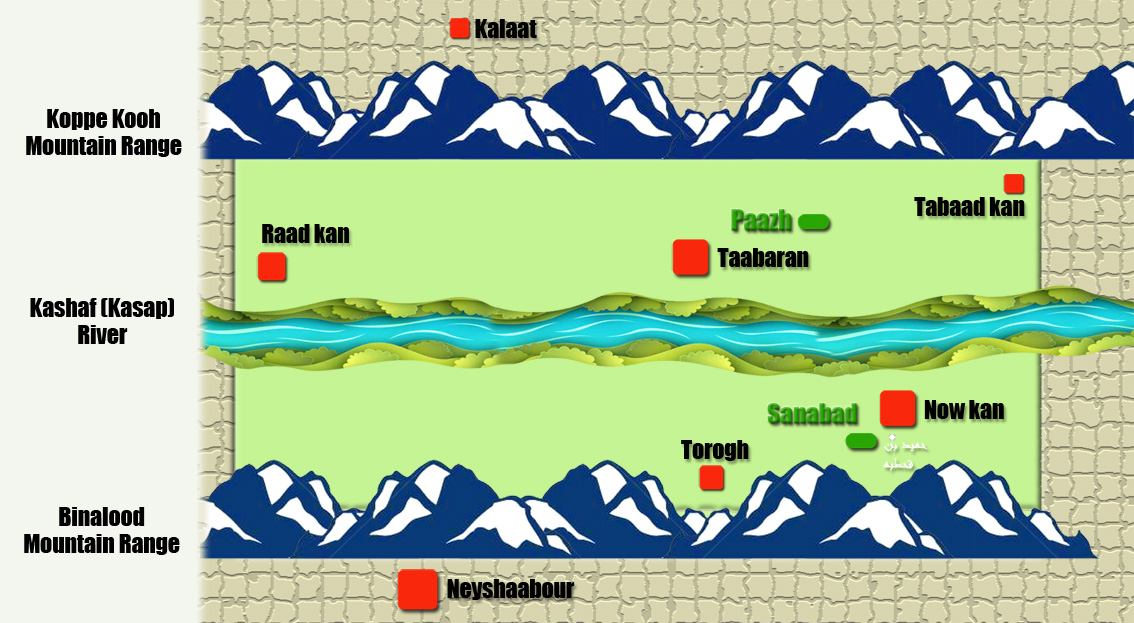
Location of Toroq in Toos (ancient Susia) region.

Torqabeh (Persian: طرقبه) (Note: Also romanized as Ţoroqbeh, Ţorqabeh, and Torqebeh; also known as Targhobeh) is a city in Torqabeh District of Torqabeh and Shandiz County, (Note: Formerly Binalud County) Razavi Khorasan province, Iran, serving as capital of both the county and the district.

== Population ==
At the time of the 2006 National Census, the city's population was 13,158 in 3,668 households, when it was in Mashhad County. The following census in 2011 counted 16,718 people in 5,067 households, by which time the district had been separated from the county in the establishment of Binalud County. (Note: Renamed Torqabeh and Shandiz County) The 2016 census measured the population of the city as 20,998 people in 6,612 households.
