= Estarabad Mahalleh =

Estarabad Mahalleh استرابادمحله
- Village
- Location within Iran
- Coordinates: 36°30′44″N 52°48′02″E
- Country: Iran
- Province: Mazandaran
- County: Qaem Shahr
- Bakhsh: Central
- Rural District: Balatajan

Population (2006)
  - Total: 188
- Time zone: UTC+3:30 (IRST)
  - Summer (DST): UTC+4:30 (IRDT)

Estarabad Mahalleh (Persian: استرابادمحله, also Romanized as Estarābād Maḩalleh; also known as Mahalleh) is a village in Balatajan Rural District, in the Central District of Qaem Shahr County, Mazandaran Province, Iran. At the 2006 census, its population was 188, in 55 families.
