= Mahalleh Kola =

Mahalleh Kola محله كلا
- Village
- Location within Iran
- Coordinates: 36°37′12″N 52°55′17″E
- Country: Iran
- Province: Mazandaran
- County: Juybar
- Bakhsh: Central
- Rural District: Siyahrud

Population (2006)
  - Total: 451
- Time zone: UTC+3:30 (IRST)
  - Summer (DST): UTC+4:30 (IRDT)

Mahalleh Kola (Persian: محله كلا, also Romanized as Maḩalleh Kolā) is a village in Siyahrud Rural District, in the Central District of Juybar County, Mazandaran Province, Iran. At the 2006 census, its population was 451, in 126 families.
