= Alor Tajar =

Coordinates: 6°05′36.2″N 100°25′54″E

Alor Tajar الور تاجر
- Subdistrict
- Interactive map of Alor Tajar الور تاجر
- Country: Malaysia
- State: Kedah
- District: Kota Setar

Alor Tajar, also known as Tajar, is a subdistrict, located in Kota Setar District, Kedah, Malaysia.

This district is located adjacent to Derga parish, Pendang and Pokok Sena districts. There are Kampong 29 parishes in this area. The total area is 41,750 km^{2}. Most of the land is used for agriculture, such as paddy cultivation. The population is of 9.441 people and a number of dwellings estimated to reach 1.652.

== Infrastructure Facilities ==
- Sekolah Menengah Kebangsaan Tajar
- Sekolah Kebangsaan Darul Hikmah (formerly SK Tok Sibil).
- Sekolah Kebangsaan Gelam
- Kuarters SMK Tajar.

== Road Networks ==
- Jalan Datuk Kumbar
- Jalan Alor Mengkudu
- Jalan Titi Haji Idris
- Jalan Kampung Jelai
- Jalan Kampung Tok Keling

== Village List ==
- Kampung Alor Binjal
- Kampung Pulau Binjal
- Kampung Bok-Bok
- Kampung Gelam
- Kampung Jelai
- Kampung Padang
- Kampung Tok Sibil
- Kampung Tok Keling
