= Maaya (given name) =

- Gender: Female

Origin
- Origin: Japanese
- Meaning: Different meanings depending on the kanji used

Other names
- Alternative spelling: マアヤ

Maaya (written: 真綾 or 真礼) is a feminine Japanese given name. Notable people with the name include:

- Maaya Sakamoto (坂本 真綾; born 1980), Japanese singer-songwriter, actress and voice actress
- Maaya Uchida (内田 真礼; born 1989), Japanese actress and voice actress
- Maaya Sako (佐古 真礼; born 2002), Japanese footballer
