= Maayan Amir =

Israeli artist, researcher and senior lecturer

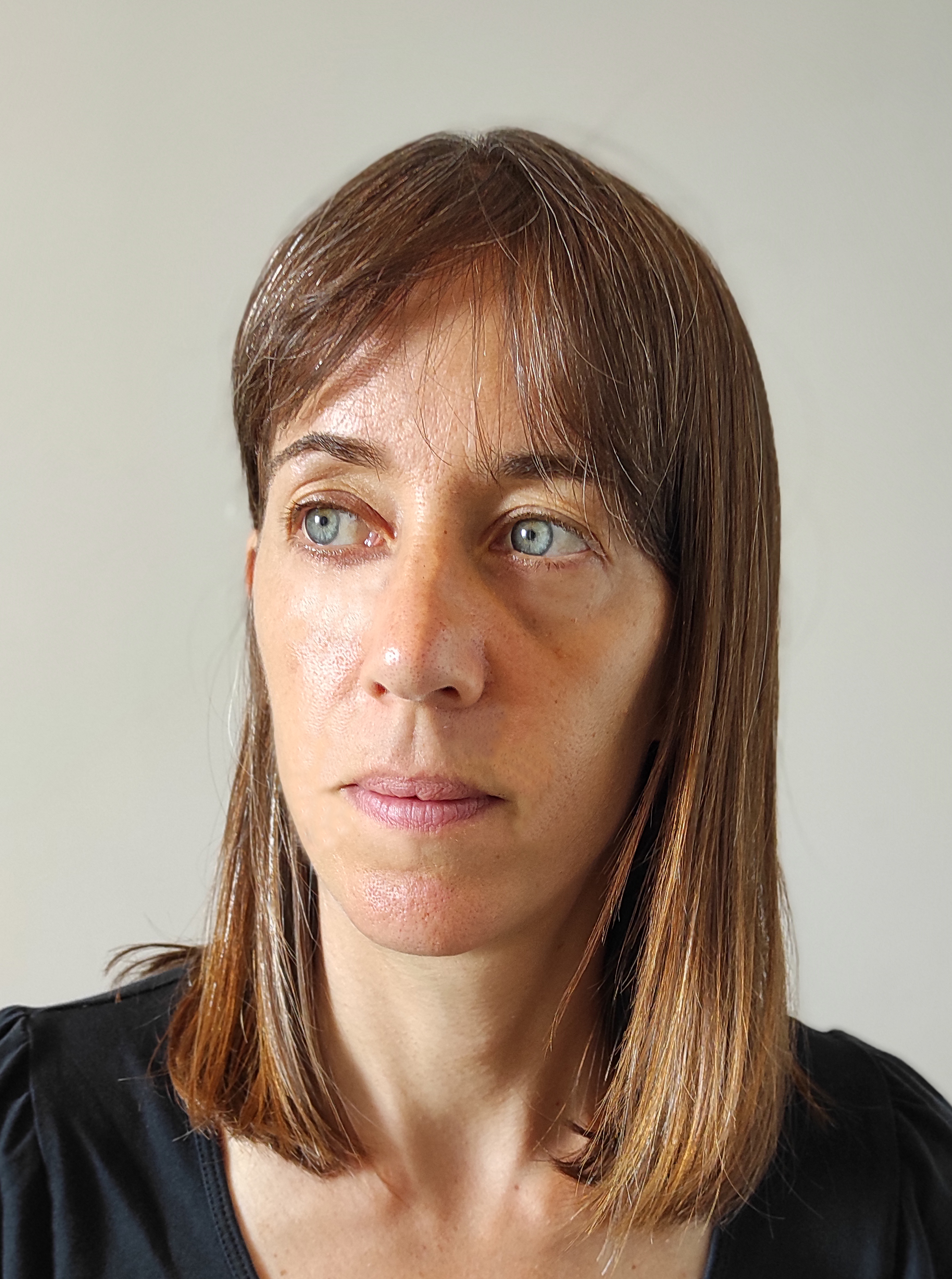
- Maayan Amir, 2018
- Born: 1978 (age 47–48); Hadera, Israel
- Education: Goldsmiths, University of London
- Known for: Researcher, Curator, Art, Video art
- Website: exterritory.wordpress.com

Maayan Amir, (Hebrew: מעין אמיר; born in 1978) Hadera, Israel, is an artist, researcher, and senior lecturer at Ben-Gurion University of the Negev (BGU), Arts Department.

== Biography ==
Amir, known for collaborative work with Ruti Sela, exhibited widely including at the Sydney, Istanbul and Berlin Biennales, New Museum Triennial, Centre Pompidou, Tate Modern, and more. Holder of UNESCO's 2011 Young Artist Award, Amir holds a Ph.D. from Goldsmith's University of London, and edited "Documentary" in 2008. As a curator and essayist, she explores state power, art and ideology, contributing to Forensic Architecture at Goldsmiths. Focused on extraterritoriality, Amir extends the concept to various spheres like representation and information regimes, defining "extraterritorial images", recognized with the IAVC/JVC Early Career Researcher Prize in 2020, she now serves at BGU as a curator and lecturer, previously heading Haifa University's MFA Fine Art Program and teaching at Tel-Aviv University.

== Exterritory project ==
Exterritory, founded by Sela and Amir in 2009, explores extraterritorial phenomena through video art and interdisciplinary collaborations. Its initiatives aim to transcend border restrictions, fostering encounters among artists from conflict zones. The project, showcased internationally, includes symposia and an anthology on extraterritoriality, drawing acclaim from scholars like Zygmunt Bauman.

== Publications - books and chapters ==
- 2018 (ed. With Ruti Sela) Extraterritorialities in Occupied Worlds, Punctum Books, Santa Barbara.
- 2014 “Extraterritorial Images.” In Forensis: The Architecture of Truth, Sternberg Press, London.
- 2011 (with Ruti Sela) “Exterritory”. In Solution 196-213: United States of Palestine-Israel, ed. Joshua Simion, Sternberg Press, London.
- 2008 (ed. with Ruti Sela) Documentally: An Anthology of Essays on Israeli Documentary Film, in Hebrew, Am-Oved, Tel Aviv.
