= Muia =

Myia or Muia (Ancient Greek: Μυῖα) may refer to:

== People ==
- Myia, a philosopher, daughter of Theano and Pythagoras
- Myia, a poet from Sparta
- Myia, the nickname of the ancient Greek poet Corinna

== Insect ==
- Μυῖα, ancient Greek for fly

== Mythology ==
- Myia (mythology), a girl who was transformed into a fly by Selene
