= Japanese ship Maya =

At least three warships of Japan have borne the name Maya:

- Japanese gunboat Maya, was a Maya-class gunboat launched in 1886 and struck in 1911
- Japanese cruiser Maya, was a Takao-class cruiser launched in 1930 and sunk in 1944
- JS Maya, is a Maya-class destroyer launched in 2018
