= Sasseneire =

Mountain in Switzerland

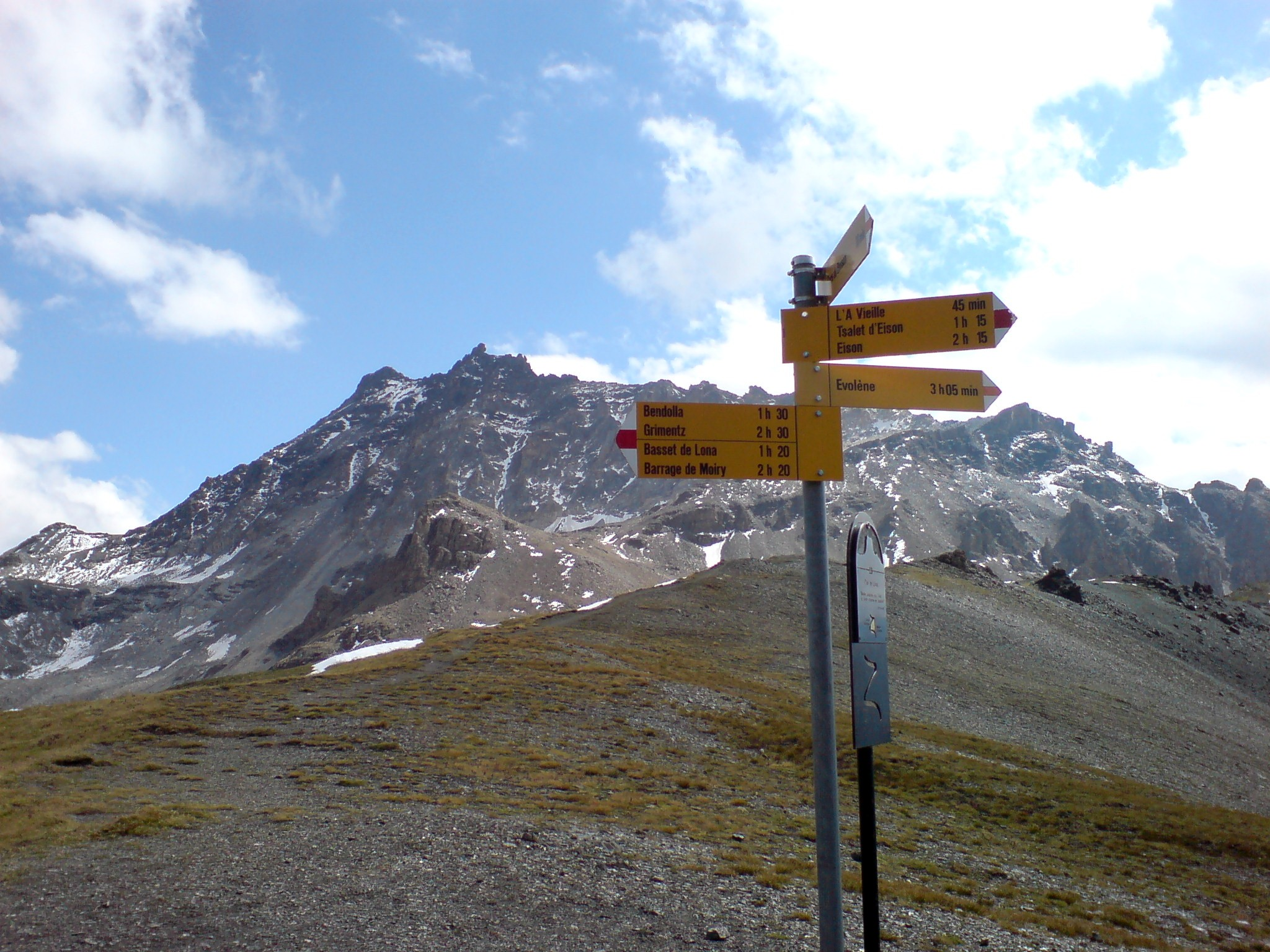
- From Pas de Lona (north side)

Highest point
- Elevation: 3,254 m (10,676 ft)
- Prominence: 386 m (1,266 ft)
- Parent peak: Monte Rosa
- Isolation: 5.94 km (3.69 mi)
- Listing: Alpine mountains above 3000 m
- Coordinates: 46°08′19.1″N 7°31′31.4″E

Geography
- Location within Switzerland
- Location: Valais, Switzerland
- Parent range: Pennine Alps

The Sasseneire is a mountain of the Swiss Pennine Alps, overlooking Evolène in the canton of Valais. It lies on the range between the valleys of Hérens and Anniviers.

== Climbing routes ==
Normal mountaineering routes to Sasseneire are from Val de Moiry on the east and from Val d’Herens on the west. Both routes lead to Col de Torrent which is at 2916 m above the sea level. A very convenient start point is the dam at the Moiry lake, with the car access and with the bus service from Grimentz. You need 2.5 hours from the dam to the Col de Torrent.

It takes approximately one hour from the Col to the summit by following the ridge in a northerly direction. Near the top is the only slightly exposed section, a stone boulder in between the two peaks to reach to cross, with a fairly decent drop on both sides.
