= Shandiz =

City in Razavi Khorasan province, Iran

Shandiz Persian: شانديز
- City
- Location within Iran
- Coordinates: 36°23′46″N 59°18′33″E
- Country: Iran
- Province: Razavi Khorasan
- County: Torqabeh and Shandiz
- District: Shandiz

Population (2016)
  - Total: 13,987
- Time zone: UTC+3:30 (IRST)

Shandiz (Persian: شانديز) (Note: Also romanized as Shāndīz; formerly Shāhī Deh) is a city in, and the capital of, Shandiz District in Torqabeh and Shandiz County, (Note: Formerly Binalud County) Razavi Khorasan province, Iran.

== Demographics ==
=== Population ===
At the time of the 2006 National Census, the city's population was 6,402 in 1,706 households, when it was in Torqabeh District of Mashhad County. The following census in 2011 counted 10,428 people in 3,056 households, by which time the district had been separated from the county in the establishment of Binalud County. (Note: Renamed Torqabeh and Shandiz County) Shandiz was transferred to the new Shandiz District The 2016 census measured the population of the city as 13,987 people in 4,342 households.

== Climate ==
The climate of Shandiz is moderate, and due to the green nature, vegetation, thick and dense trees, the river, the southern and western heights of the city, it has cool weather in summers and very cold winters. Its average annual temperature is 25 degrees Celsius.
