= Garde de Bordon =

Mountain in Switzerland

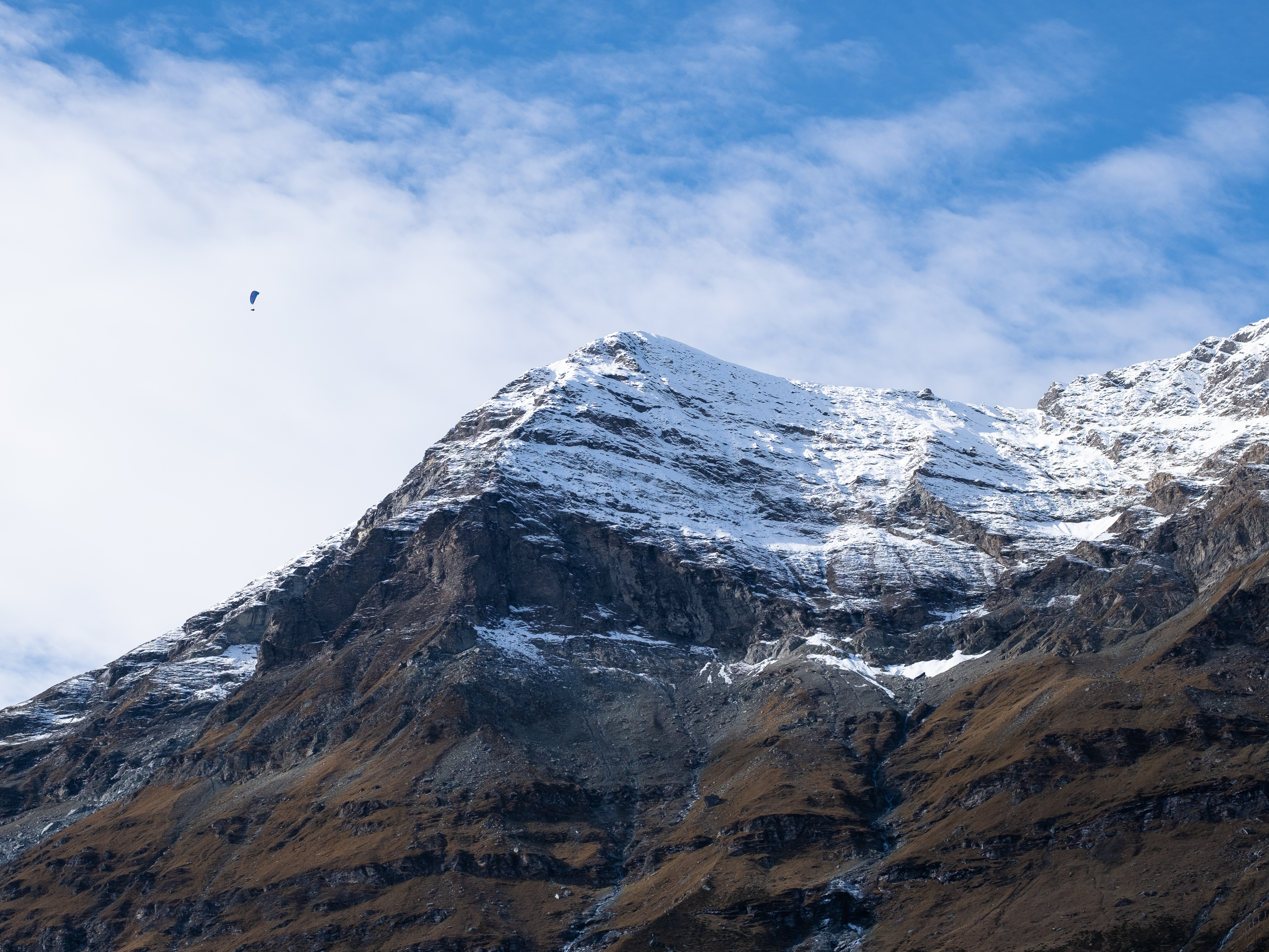

Highest point
- Elevation: 3,310 m (10,860 ft)
- Prominence: 249 m (817 ft)
- Parent peak: Monte Rosa
- Coordinates: 46°07′15″N 7°35′50″E

Geography
- Location within Switzerland
- Location: Switzerland
- Parent range: Pennine Alps

The Garde de Bordon is a mountain in the Pennine Alps.

== Access ==
To get to the mountain, visitors follow the road from the Rhone valley, from Sierre and through Val d’ Anniverse in the direction of Grimentz. The other option is to continue to Zinal.

== Climbing ==
The mountain is climbed either from the Zinal side, or from the Moiry lake where the route starts directly at the dam. In both cases a climber's first goal is Col de Sorebois (2835 m). There are cairns marking the route.
