= Shandiz Rural District =

Rural district in Razavi Khorasan province, Iran

Shandiz Rural District Persian: دهستان شانديز
- Rural District
- Location within Iran
- Coordinates: 36°26′N 59°22′E
- Country: Iran
- Province: Razavi Khorasan
- County: Torqabeh and Shandiz
- District: Shandiz
- Established: 1986

Population (2016)
  - Total: 15,693
- Time zone: UTC+3:30 (IRST)

Shandiz Rural District (Persian: دهستان شانديز) is in Shandiz District of Torqabeh and Shandiz County, (Note: Formerly Binalud County) Razavi Khorasan province, Iran. Its capital was the village of Archang, now a neighborhood in the city of Shandiz.

== Demographics ==
=== Population ===
At the time of the 2006 National Census, the rural district's population (as a part of Torqabeh District in Mashhad County) was 15,431 in 4,132 households. There were 12,687 inhabitants in 3,591 households at the following census of 2011, by which time the district had been separated from the county in the establishment of Binalud County. (Note: Renamed Torqabeh and Shandiz County) The rural district was transferred to the new Shandiz District. The 2016 census measured the population of the rural district as 15,693 in 4,585 households. The most populous of its 18 villages was Virani, with 4,698 people.

=== Other villages in the rural district ===
- Chah Khaseh
- Chaheshk
- Dehnow
- Farahabad
- Fiani
- Hesar-e Sorkh
- Safiabad
- Sar Asiab
- Suran
