= Torqabeh Rural District =

Rural district in Razavi Khorasan province, Iran

Torqabeh Rural District Persian: دهستان طرقبه
- Rural District
- Location within Iran
- Coordinates: 36°14′N 59°25′E
- Country: Iran
- Province: Razavi Khorasan
- County: Torqabeh and Shandiz
- District: Torqabeh
- Established: 1986
- Capital: Hesar

Population (2016)
  - Total: 6,499
- Time zone: UTC+3:30 (IRST)

Torqabeh Rural District (Persian: دهستان طرقبه) is in Torqabeh District of Torqabeh and Shandiz County, (Note: Formerly Binalud County) Razavi Khorasan province, Iran. Its capital is the village of Hesar.

== Demographics ==
=== Population ===
At the time of the 2006 National Census, the rural district's population (as a part of Mashhad County) was 15,348 in 4,150 households. There were 6,029 inhabitants in 1,953 households at the following census of 2011, by which time the district had been separated from the county in the establishment of Binalud County. (Note: Renamed Torqabeh and Shandiz County) The 2016 census measured the population of the rural district as 6,499 in 2,371 households. The most populous of its 33 villages was Hesar, with 1,718 people.

=== Other villages in the rural district ===
- Azghad
- Kalateh-ye Abdol
- Khanrud
- Mayan-e Olya
- Mayan-e Sofla
- Mayan-e Vosta
- Moghan
- Nowchah
