= Shandiz District =

District in Razavi Khorasan province, Iran

Shandiz District بخش شاندیز
- District
- Location within Iran
- Coordinates: 36°23′N 59°16′E
- Country: Iran
- Province: Razavi Khorasan
- County: Torqabeh and Shandiz
- Established: 2007
- Capital: Shandiz

Population (2016)
  - Total: 36,294
- Time zone: UTC+3:30 (IRST)

Shandiz District (Persian: بخش شاندیز) is in Torqabeh and Shandiz County, (Note: Formerly Binalud County) Razavi Khorasan province, Iran. Its capital is the city of Shandiz.

== History ==
In 2007, Torqabeh District was separated from Mashhad County in the establishment of Binalud County, (Note: Renamed Torqabeh and Shandiz County) which was divided into two districts of two rural districts each, with the city of Torqabeh as its capital.

== Demographics ==
=== Population ===
At the time of the 2011 National Census, the district's population was 30,981 people in 8,965 households. The 2016 census measured the population of the district as 36,294 inhabitants in 11,054 households.

=== Administrative divisions ===
Shandiz District Population
| Administrative Divisions | 2011 | 2016 |
|---|---|---|
| Abardeh RD | 7,866 | 6,614 |
| Shandiz RD | 12,687 | 15,693 |
| Shandiz (city) | 10,428 | 13,987 |
| Total | 30,981 | 36,294 |
RD = Rural District
