= Mashhad County =

County in Razavi Khorasan Province, Iran

Mashhad County Persian: شهرستان مشهد
- County
- Kuhsangi Street in the city of Mashhad

- Location of Mashhad County in Razavi Khorasan province (top right, green)

- Location of Razavi Khorasan province in Iran
- Coordinates: 36°22′N 59°50′E
- Country: Iran
- Province: Razavi Khorasan
- Capital: Mashhad
- Districts: Central, Ahmadabad, Razaviyeh

Area
  - Total: 9,169 km^{2} (3,540 sq mi)

Population (2016)
  - Total: 3,372,660
  - Density: 367.8/km^{2} (952.7/sq mi)
- Time zone: UTC+3:30 (IRST)

Mashhad County (Persian: شهرستان مشهد) is in Razavi Khorasan province, Iran. Its capital is the city of Mashhad, which is also the capital of the province.

== History ==
In 2007, Torqabeh District was separated from the county in the establishment of Binalud County. (Note: Renamed Torqabeh and Shandiz County)

== Demographics ==
=== Population ===
At the time of the 2006 National Census, the county's population was 2,848,637, in 746,652 households. The following census in 2011 counted 3,069,941 people in 889,034 households. The 2016 census measured the population of the county as 3,372,660, in 1,021,068 households. It is the most populous county in the province and the second most populous in the country, behind Tehran County.

=== Administrative divisions ===
Mashhad County's population history and administrative structure over three consecutive censuses are shown in the following table.

Mashhad County Population
Administrative Divisions	2006	2011	2016
Central District	2,679,938	2,991,644	3,280,368
Darzab RD	12,886	12,192	13,112
Kardeh RD	7,096	6,115	5,354
Kenevist RD	29,184	22,538	27,987
Miyan Velayat RD	20,397	23,502	29,751
Tabadkan RD	71,170	83,159	105,285
Tus RD	128,405	77,880	97,695
Mashhad (city)	2,410,800	2,766,258	3,001,184
Ahmadabad District	51,267	28,118	32,988
Piveh Zhan RD	17,262	17,768	20,589
Sarjam RD	32,844	8,863	10,343
Binalud (city)			
Malekabad (city)	1,161	1,487	2,056
Razaviyeh District	67,093	50,169	59,232
Abravan RD	13,561	14,209	14,905
Meyami RD	44,348	25,070	28,890
Pain Velayat RD	6,399	6,348	6,587
Razaviyeh (city)	2,785	4,542	8,850
Torqabeh District (Note: Transferred to Binalud County, renamed Torqabeh and Shandiz County)	50,339		
Shandiz RD	15,431		
Torqabeh RD	15,348		
Shandiz (city)	6,402		
Torqabeh (city)	13,158		
Total	2,848,637	3,069,941	3,372,660
RD = Rural District

== See also ==
Media related to Mashhad County at Wikimedia Commons
