= Torqabeh District =

District in Razavi Khorasan province, Iran

Torqabeh District Persian: بخش طرقبه
- District
- Location within Iran
- Coordinates: 36°15′N 59°23′E
- Country: Iran
- Province: Razavi Khorasan
- County: Torqabeh and Shandiz
- Capital: Torqabeh

Population (2016)
  - Total: 33,344
- Time zone: UTC+3:30 (IRST)

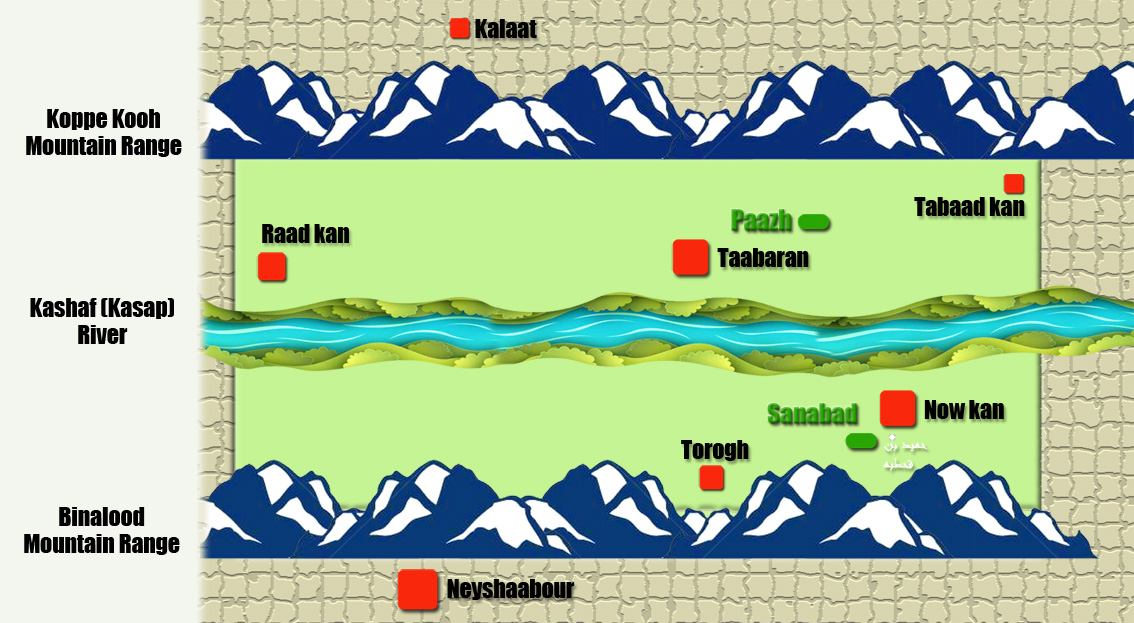
Location of Toroq in Toos (ancient Susia) region.

Torqabeh District (Persian: بخش طرقبه) is in Torqabeh and Shandiz County, (Note: Formerly Binalud County) Razavi Khorasan province, Iran. Its capital is the city of Torqabeh.

== Demographics ==
=== Population ===
At the time of the 2006 National Census, the district's population (as a part of Mashhad County) was 50,339 in 13,656 households. The following census in 2011 counted 27,502 people in 8,501 households, by which time the district had been separated from the county in the establishment of Binalud County. (Note: Renamed Torqabeh and Shandiz County) The 2016 census measured the population of the district as 33,344 inhabitants in 10,805 households.

=== Administrative divisions ===
Torqabeh District Population (Note: As a part of Mashhad County at the 2006 census)
Administrative Divisions	2006	2011	2016
Jagharq RD		4,755	5,847
Shandiz RD (Note: Transferred to Shandiz District)	15,431		
Torqabeh RD	15,348	6,029	6,499
Shandiz (city)	6,402		
Torqabeh (city)	13,158	16,718	20,998
Total	50,339	27,502	33,344
RD = Rural District
