= Torqabeh and Shandiz County =

County in Razavi Khorasan province, Iran

Torqabeh and Shandiz County Persian: شهرستان طرقبه شاندیز
- County
- Location of Torqabeh and Shandiz County in Razavi Khorasan province (center right, purple)

- Location of Razavi Khorasan province in Iran
- Coordinates: 36°18′N 59°20′E
- Country: Iran
- Province: Razavi Khorasan
- Established: 2007
- Capital: Torqabeh
- Districts: Shandiz, Torqabeh

Area
  - Total: 1,158 km^{2} (447 sq mi)

Population (2016)
  - Total: 69,640
  - Density: 60.14/km^{2} (155.8/sq mi)
- Time zone: UTC+3:30 (IRST)

Torqabeh and Shandiz County (Persian: شهرستان طرقبه شاندیز) (Note: Formerly Binalud County (شهرستان بینالود)) is in Razavi Khorasan province, Iran. Its capital is the city of Torqabeh.

== History ==
In 2007, Torqabeh District was separated from Mashhad County in the establishment of Binalud County, (Note: Renamed Torqabeh and Shandiz County) which was divided into two districts of two rural districts each, with Torqabeh as its capital. The county was renamed Torqabeh and Shandiz County in 2022.

== Demographics ==
=== Population ===
At the time of the 2011 National Census, the county's population was 58,483 people in 17,457 households. The 2016 census measured the population of the county as 69,640 in 21,861 households.

=== Administrative divisions ===
Torqabeh and Shandiz County's population history and administrative structure over two consecutive censuses are shown in the following table.

Torqabeh and Shandiz County Population
Administrative Divisions	2011	2016
Shandiz District	30,981	36,294
Abardeh RD	7,866	6,614
Shandiz RD	12,687	15,693
Shandiz (city)	10,428	13,987
Torqabeh District	27,502	33,344
Jagharq RD	4,755	5,847
Torqabeh RD	6,029	6,499
Torqabeh (city)	16,718	20,998
Total	58,483	69,640
RD = Rural District

== See also ==
Media related to Torqabeh and Shandiz County at Wikimedia Commons
