= Reisbach =

Reisbach may refer to:

- Reisbach (Saar), a small town in Saarland, Germany
- Reisbach (Vils), a city in Bavaria, Germany in the district of Dingolfing-Landau
- Reisbach (Palatinate), a river of Alsace, France, and Rhineland-Palatinate, Germany
- Wolfsindis of Reisbach, regional saint of the Middle Ages in Bavaria

== See also ==
- Schachten (disambiguation)
