= 1712 =

1712 in various calendars
- Gregorian calendar: 1712; MDCCXII
- Ab urbe condita: 2465
- Armenian calendar: 1161; ԹՎ ՌՃԿԱ
- Assyrian calendar: 6462
- Balinese saka calendar: 1633–1634
- Bengali calendar: 1118–1119
- Berber calendar: 2662
- British Regnal year: 10 Ann. 1 – 11 Ann. 1
- Buddhist calendar: 2256
- Burmese calendar: 1074
- Byzantine calendar: 7220–7221
- Chinese calendar: 辛卯年 (Metal Rabbit); 4409 or 4202 — to — 壬辰年 (Water Dragon); 4410 or 4203
- Coptic calendar: 1428–1429
- Discordian calendar: 2878
- Ethiopian calendar: 1704–1705
- Hebrew calendar: 5472–5473
- Hindu calendars
- Vikram Samvat: 1768–1769
- Shaka Samvat: 1633–1634
- Kali Yuga: 4812–4813
- Holocene calendar: 11712
- Igbo calendar: 712–713
- Iranian calendar: 1090–1091
- Islamic calendar: 1123–1124
- Japanese calendar: Shōtoku 2 (正徳２年)
- Javanese calendar: 1635–1636
- Julian calendar: Gregorian minus 11 days
- Korean calendar: 4045
- Minguo calendar: 200 before ROC 民前200年
- Nanakshahi calendar: 244
- Thai solar calendar: 2254–2255
- Tibetan calendar: ལྕགས་མོ་ཡོས་ལོ་ (female Iron-Hare); 1838 or 1457 or 685 — to — ཆུ་ཕོ་འབྲུག་ལོ་ (male Water-Dragon); 1839 or 1458 or 686

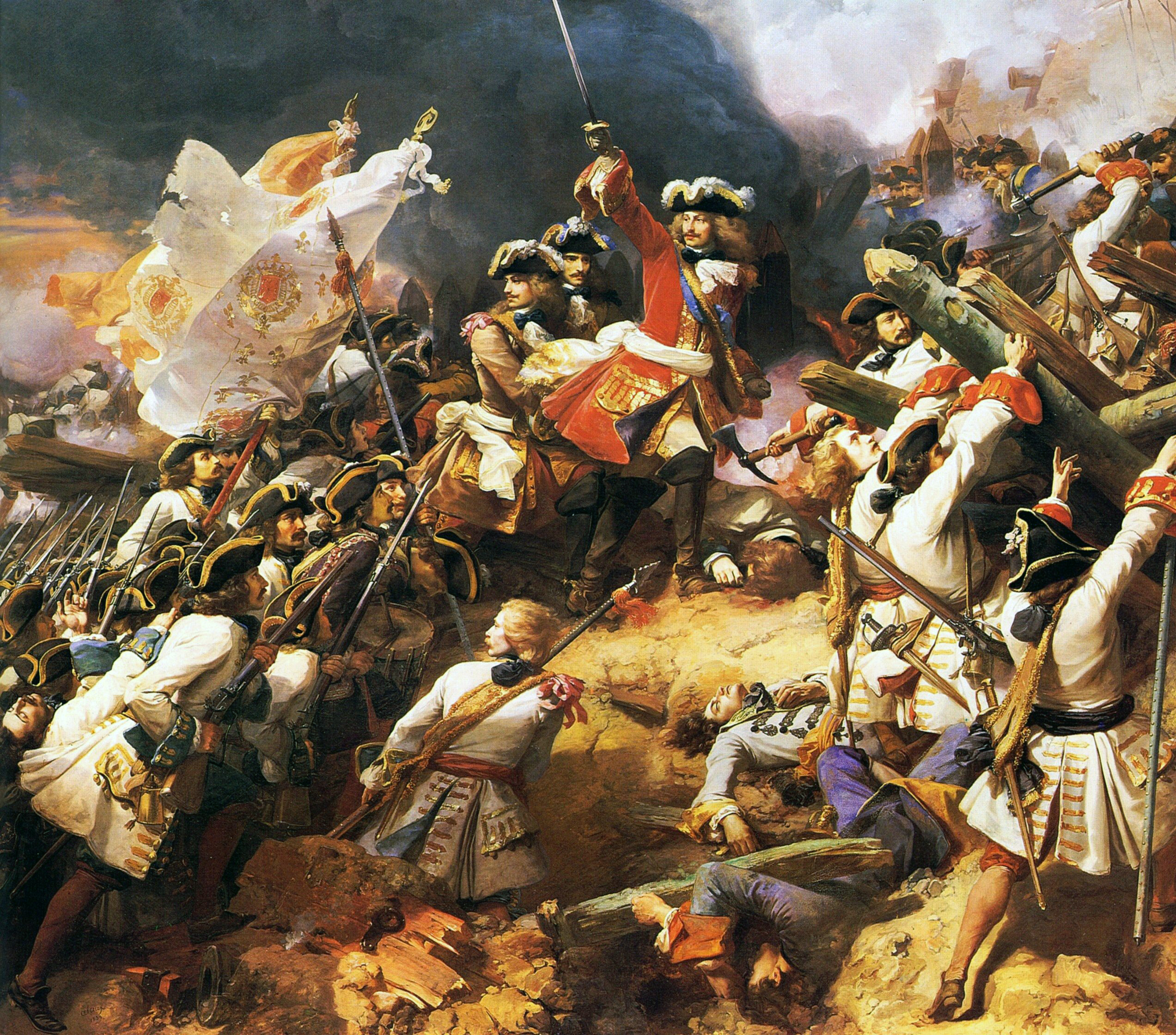
July 24: Battle of Denain

1712 (MDCCXII) was a leap year starting on Friday of the Gregorian calendar and a leap year starting on Tuesday of the Julian calendar, the 1712th year of the Common Era (CE) and Anno Domini (AD) designations, the 712th year of the 2nd millennium, the 12th year of the 18th century, and the 3rd year of the 1710s decade. As of the start of 1712, the Gregorian calendar was 11 days ahead of the Julian calendar, which remained in localized use until 1923.

In the Swedish calendar it began as a leap year starting on Monday and remained so until Thursday, February 29. By adding a second leap day, Friday, February 30, Sweden reverted to the Julian calendar and the rest of the year (from Saturday, March 1) was in sync with the Julian calendar. Sweden finally made the switch from the Julian to the Gregorian calendar in 1753. This year had 367 days.

== Events ==
=== January–March ===
- January 8 – Total eclipse of the sun visible from 60.6°S 49.2°E
- January 12 – The premiere of the opera Idoménée by André Campra takes place at the Théâtre du Palais-Royal in Paris.
- January 16 – A military engineering school is established in Moscow which is to become the A.F. Mozhaysky Military-Space Academy.
- January 26 – The Old Pummerin, a 18,161 kg bell newly installed in the Stephansdom, St. Stephen's Cathedral, in Vienna, is rung for the first time to mark the entry of Charles VI to Vienna from Frankfurt after his coronation as Emperor. It takes a quarter-hour for 16 men pulling on the bell rope to swing the heavy bell back-and-forth enough for the clapper to strike; the resulting forces endanger the tower so the architect orders that in future the bell be rung only by pulling its clapper.
- February 10 – Huilliche uprising of 1712: Huilliche people in Chile's Chiloé Archipelago rise up against Spanish encomenderos as vengeance for perceived injustices.
- Early March – Start of the Cassard expedition, a sea voyage by French Navy captain Jacques Cassard during which he ransacks Santiago in the Cape Verde Islands and pillages Montserrat, Antigua, Surinam, Berbice, Essequibo, St. Eustatius and Curaçao, returning to France with loot worth over nine million francs.
- March 3 – Scottish Episcopalians Act 1711 comes into effect, leading to incorporation of the Scottish Episcopal Church.
- March 11 (February 30 Swedish Style, February 29 on the Julian calendar) – Sweden temporarily adopts the rare February 30, as a day to adjust the Swedish Calendar back to the Julian calendar.
- March 15 – HMS Dragon, a 38-gun fourth rate frigate of the British Royal Navy, is wrecked on Les Casquets rocks to the west of Alderney.
- March 30 – Anne, Queen of Great Britain administers the Royal touch (a ritual with the intent to cure illness) for the last time; 300 scrofulous people are touched, the last of whom is Samuel Johnson.

=== April –June ===
- April 6–7 – New York Slave Revolt of 1712: An insurrection in New York City results in nine whites being killed, and 21 slaves and other blacks being convicted and executed.
- April 11 – Great Northern War: the Battle of Fladstrand takes place at sea near Fladstrand, Jylland, between Swedish and Danish forces.
- May 15 – Curuguaty in Paraguay is founded by Juan Gregorio de Bazán y Pedraza on the banks of the Curuguaty River.
- May 19 – Peter the Great moves the capital of Russia from Moscow to Saint Petersburg.
- May 22 – Charles VI, Holy Roman Emperor is crowned King of Hungary.
- June 5 – Reus in Catalonia, Spain is given the title of imperial city by Elisabeth Christine, wife of Archduke Charles.
- June 10 – Kurtkulağı Caravanserai in Adana Province, Turkey, is restored and 50 soldiers are appointed to guard it.
- June 11 – Chatham, Barnstable County, Massachusetts is incorporated as a town.
- June 17 – The newly built St Ann's Church, Manchester, England, is consecrated by the Bishop of Chester.

=== July–September ===
- July 8 – The British Royal Navy 50-gun ship HMS Advice is launched at Deptford Dockyard.
- July 20 – Jesus College, Oxford, England, inherits the extensive library of its Principal Jonathan Edwards on his death.
- July 24
  - Battle of Denain: The French defeat a combined Dutch-Austrian force.
  - Battle of Villmergen: The Reformed cantons of Switzerland defeat the Catholic cantons.
- August 1 – The Stamp Act 1712 is passed in the United Kingdom, imposing a tax on publishers, particularly of newspapers.
- August 11 – The Peace of Aarau is signed by Catholics and Protestants, ending the Toggenburg War and establishing Protestant dominance in Switzerland, while preserving the rights of Catholics.
- August 23 – The British Royal Navy 60-gun ship HMS Rippon is launched at Deptford Dockyard.
- September – Composer George Frideric Handel re-locates to London with the permission of his patron, the future King George I of Great Britain.
- September 8 – A severe hurricane buffets Bermuda for eight hours, destroying most of the churches.

=== October–December ===
- October 3 – In Scotland a warrant is issued for the arrest of outlaw Rob Roy MacGregor by Advocate Sir James Stewart.
- October 31 – King Philip V of Spain establishes the Biblioteca Nacional de España as the Palace Public Library (Biblioteca Pública de Palacio) in Madrid.
- November 4 – The Bandbox Plot aims to kill British Lord Treasurer Robert Harley, Earl of Oxford but is foiled by Jonathan Swift (author of Gulliver’s Travels).
- November 22 – The first performance of George Frideric Handel's opera Il pastor fido takes place at the Queen's Theatre in the Haymarket, London.
- December 7 – The charter of Buchach Monastery in Ukraine, founded by Stefan Aleksander Potocki and his wife Joanna née Sieniawska, is signed in Lublin.
- December 20 – Great Northern War: the Battle of Gadebusch is Sweden's final great victory in the war, preventing the loss of the city of Stralsund to Danish and Saxon forces.
- December 27 – The premiere of the opera Callirhoé by André Cardinal Destouches takes place at the Théâtre du Palais-Royal in Paris.
- December 28 – Total eclipse of the sun visible from 21.5°S 159.0°E

=== Date unknown ===
- The first known working Newcomen steam engine is built by Thomas Newcomen with John Calley, to pump water out of mines in the Black Country of England, the first device to make practical use of the power of steam to produce mechanical work.
- After many years of settlement, the Town on Queen Anne's Creek is established as a courthouse for Chowan County, North Carolina. The town is renamed Edenton in 1720, and incorporated in 1722.
- The VOC Zuytdorp is wrecked off the coast of Western Australia.
- John Arbuthnot creates the character of John Bull to represent Britain.
- A translation of the 1662 Book of Common Prayer into Irish, made by John Richardson (1664–1747), is published.

== Births ==
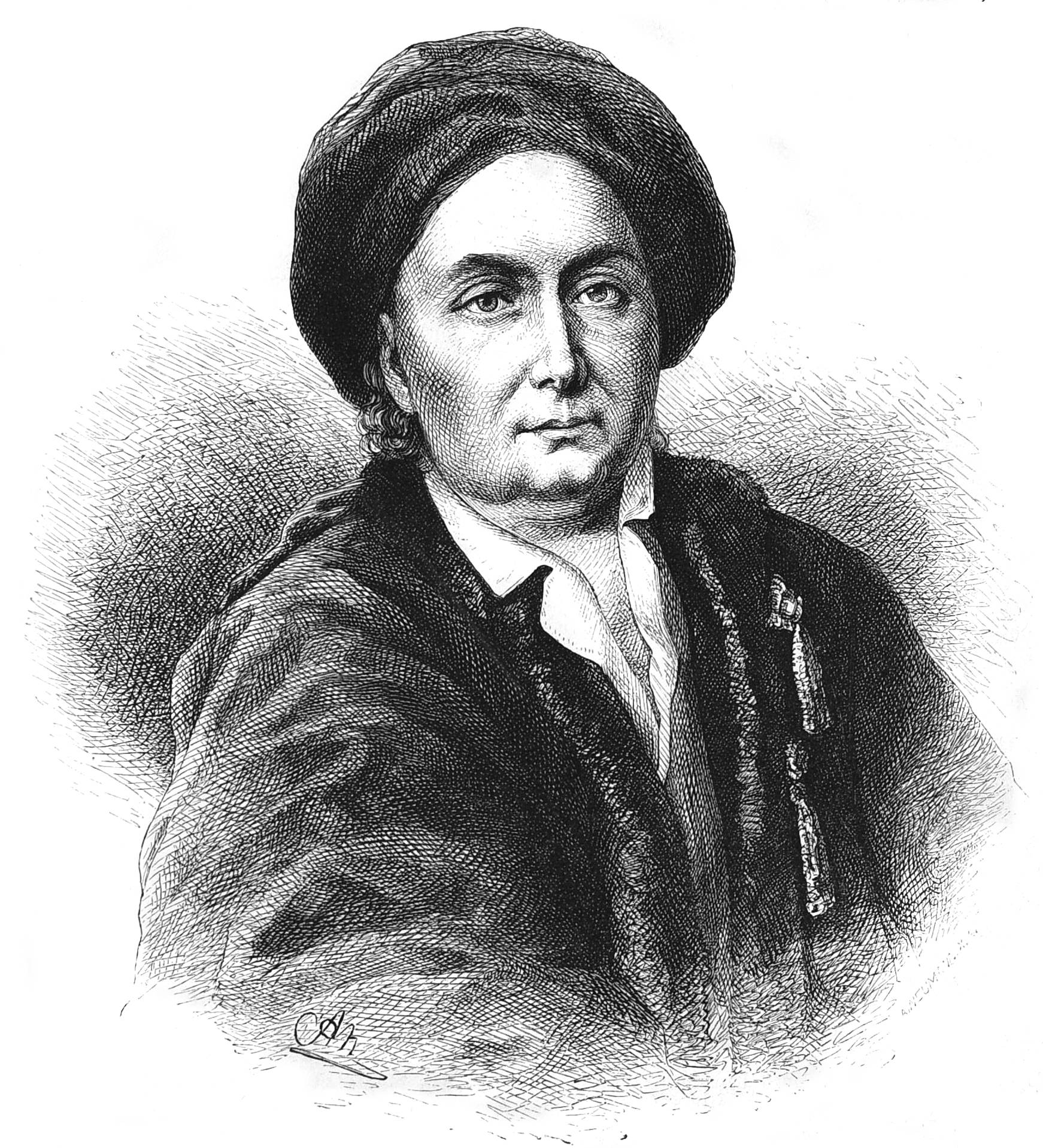
Ludwig van Beethoven the Elder born 5 January

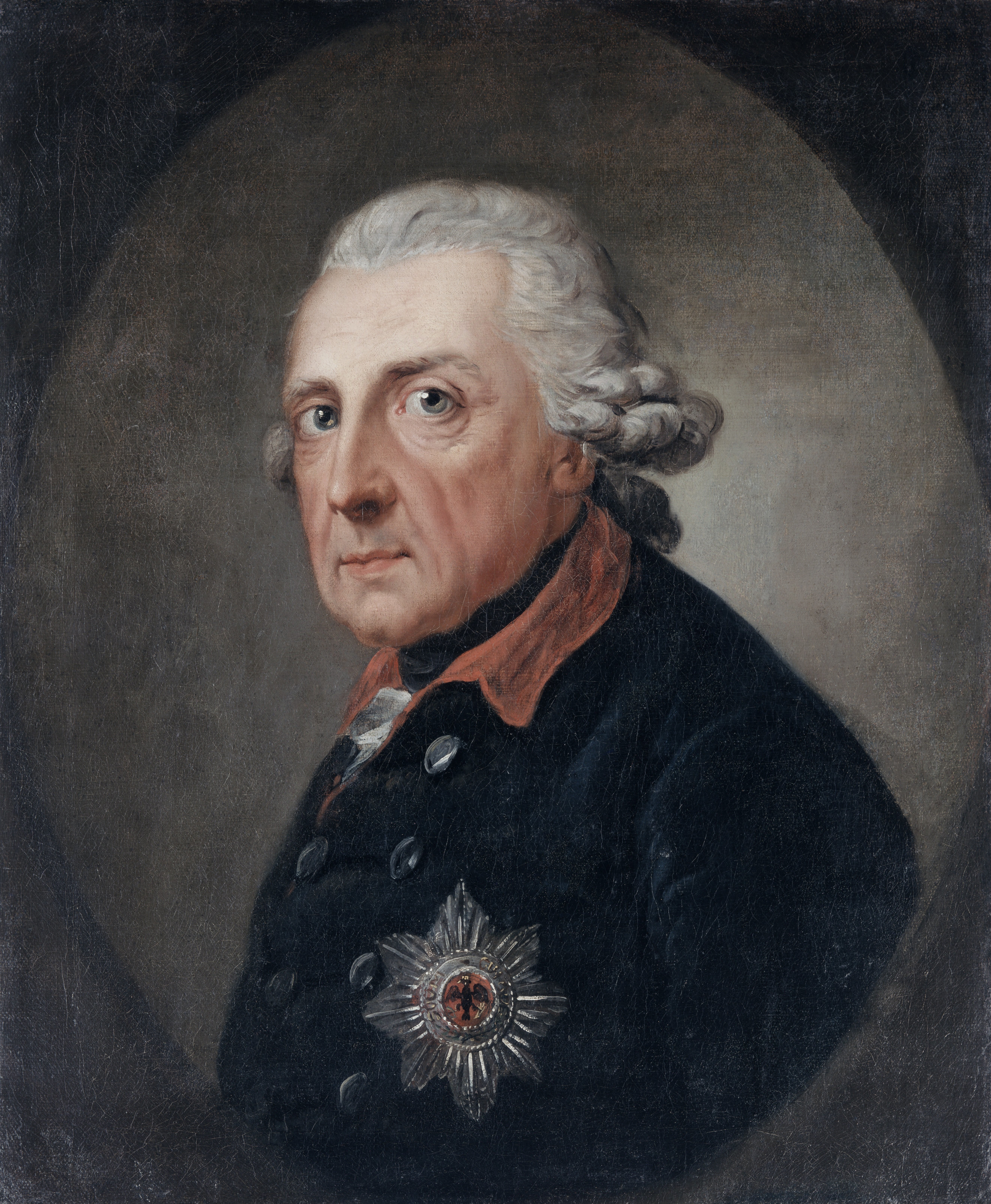
Frederick the Great born 24 January

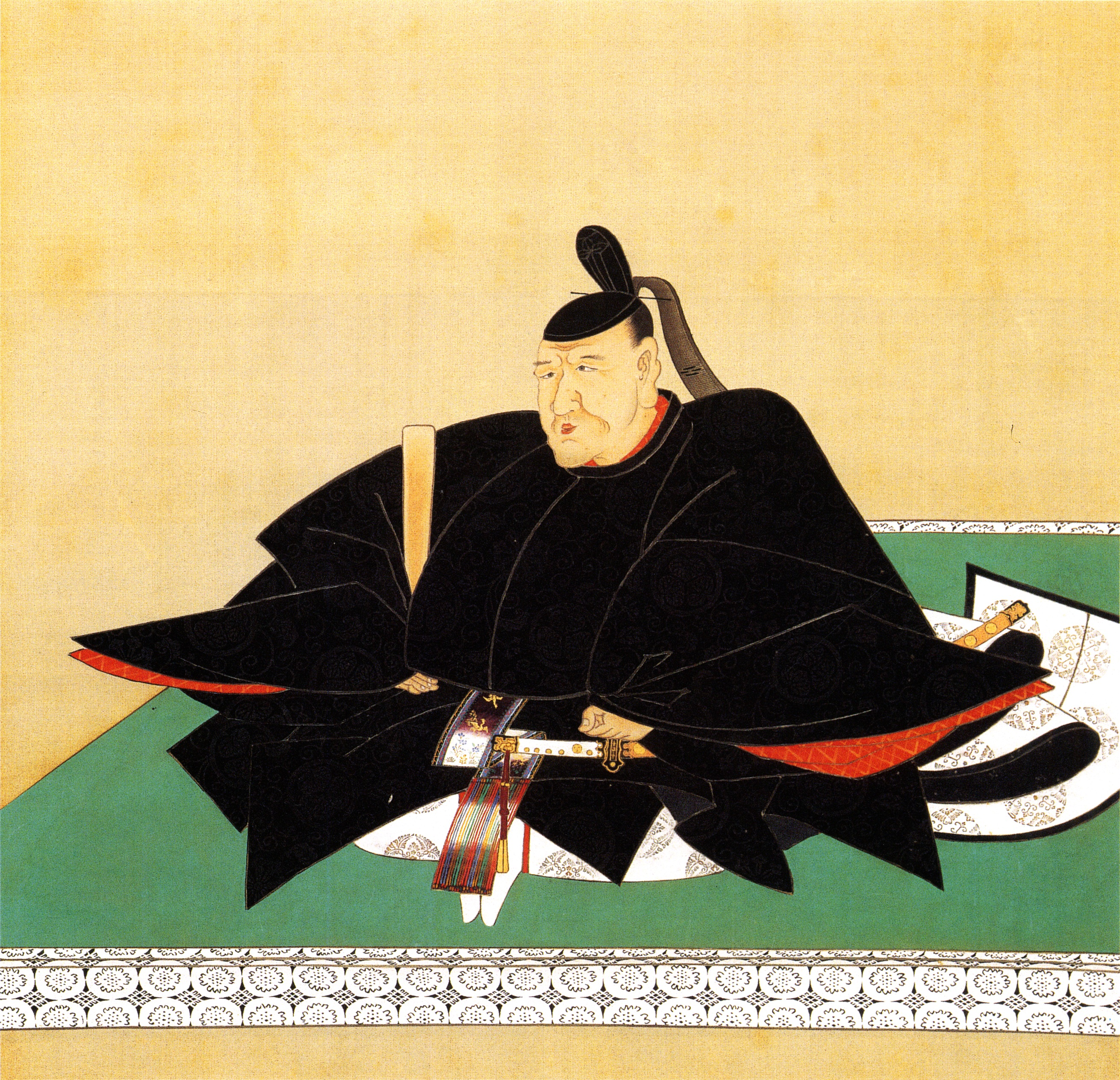
Tokugawa Ieshige born 28 January

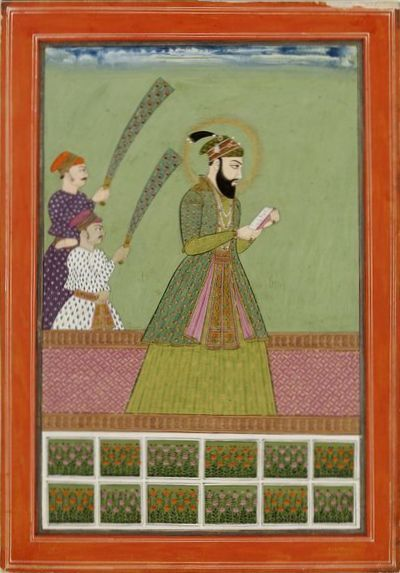
Nasir Jung born 26 February

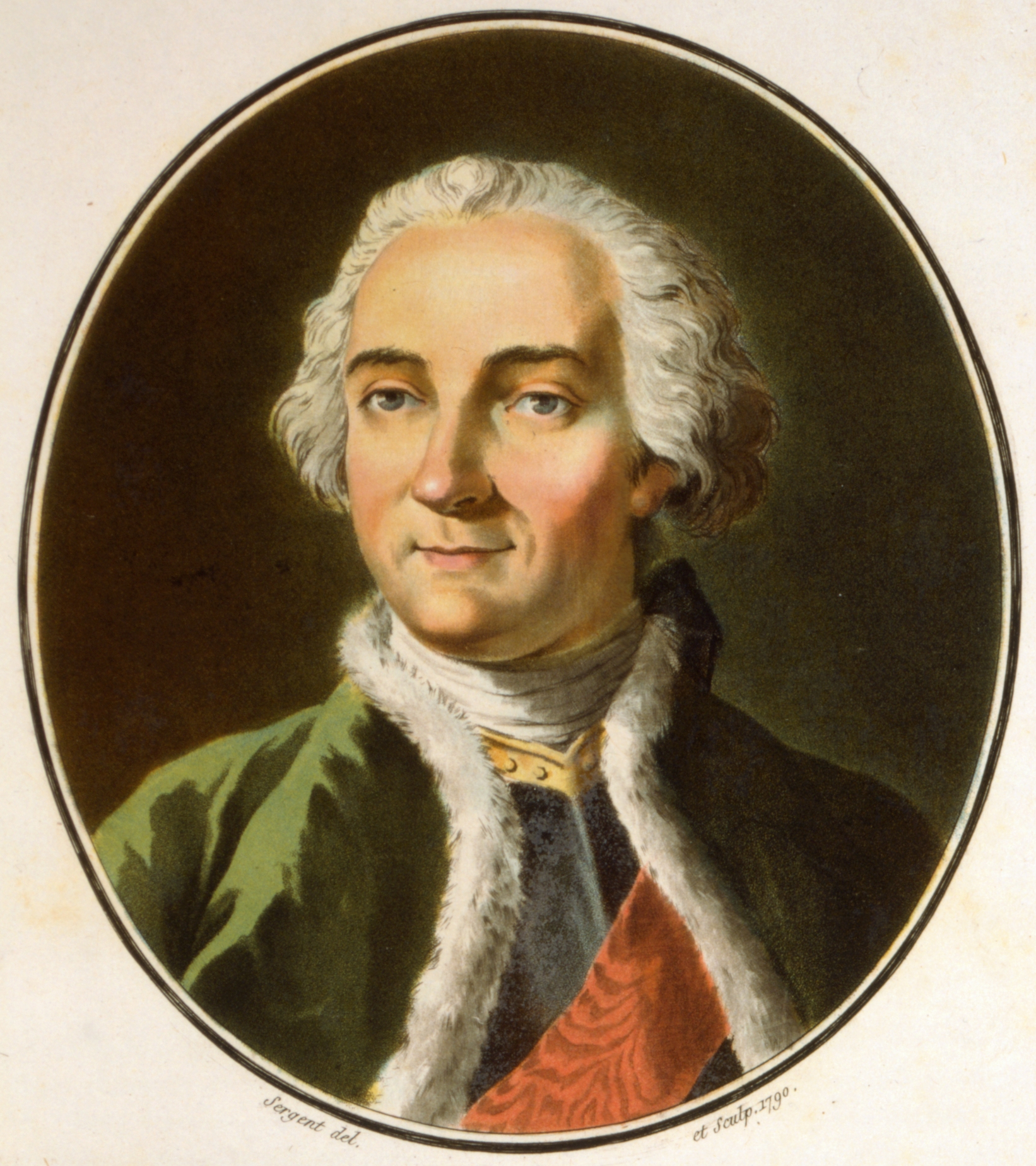
Louis-Joseph de Montcalm born 28 February

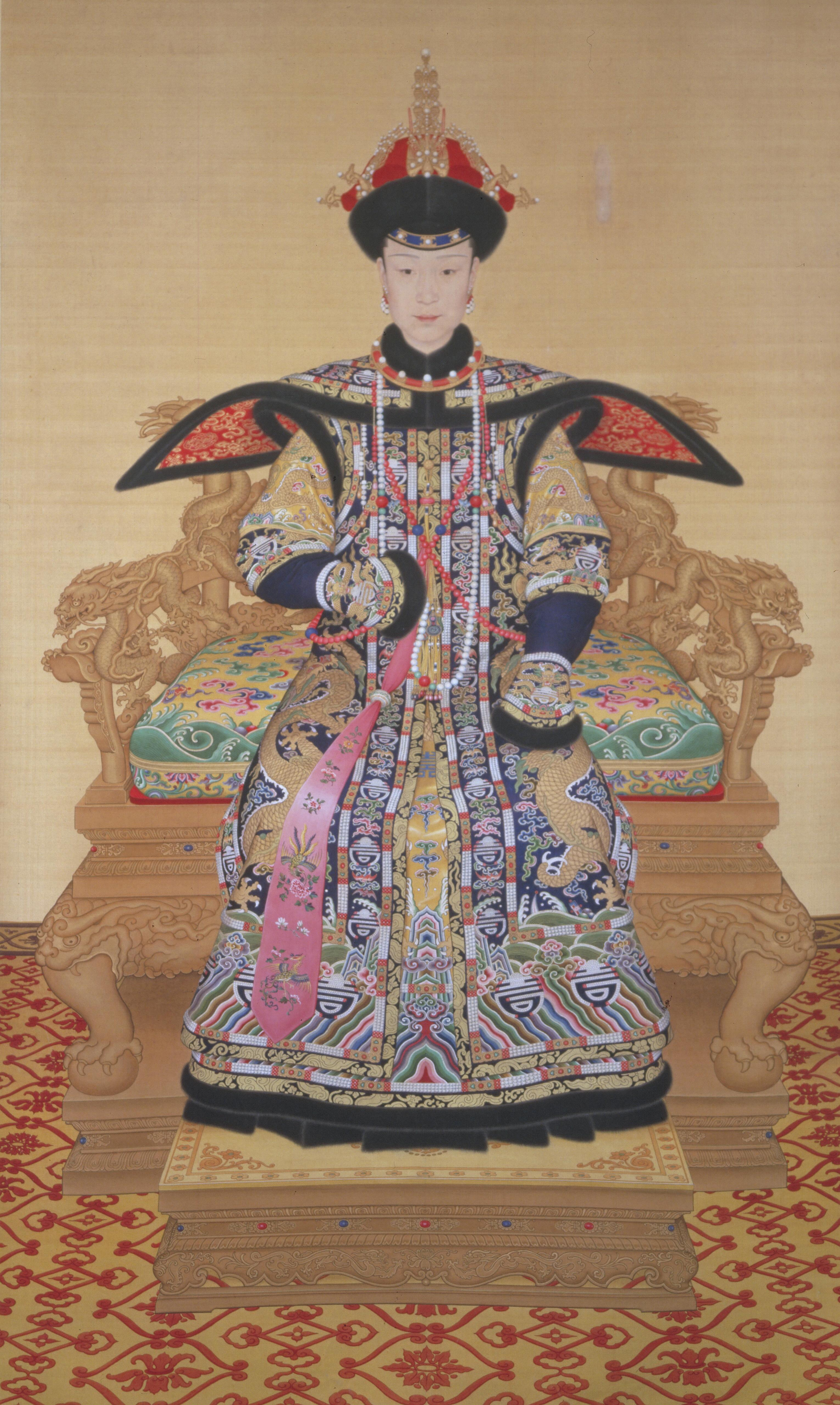
Empress Xiaoxianchun born 28 March

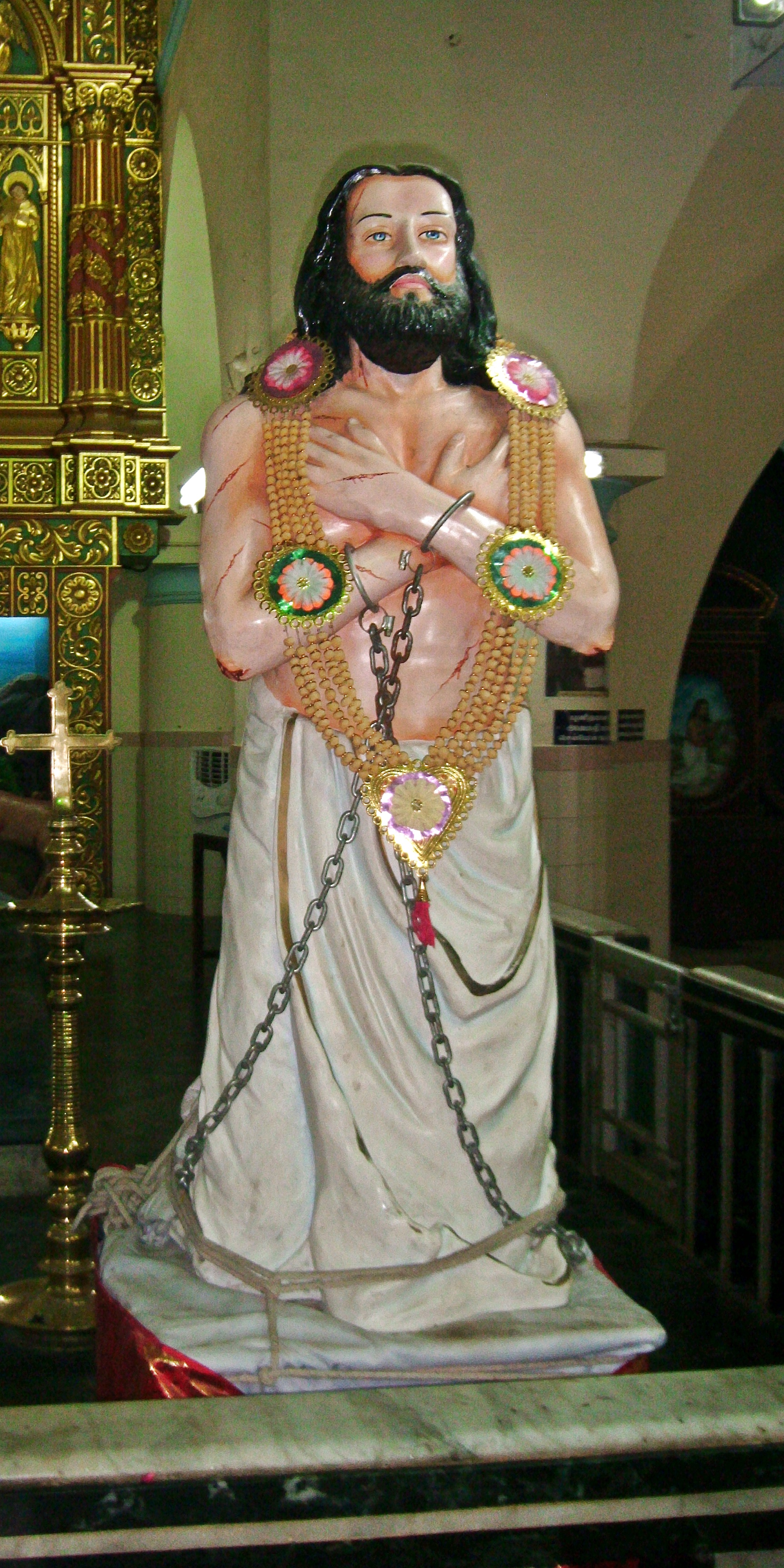
Devasahayam Pillai born 23 April

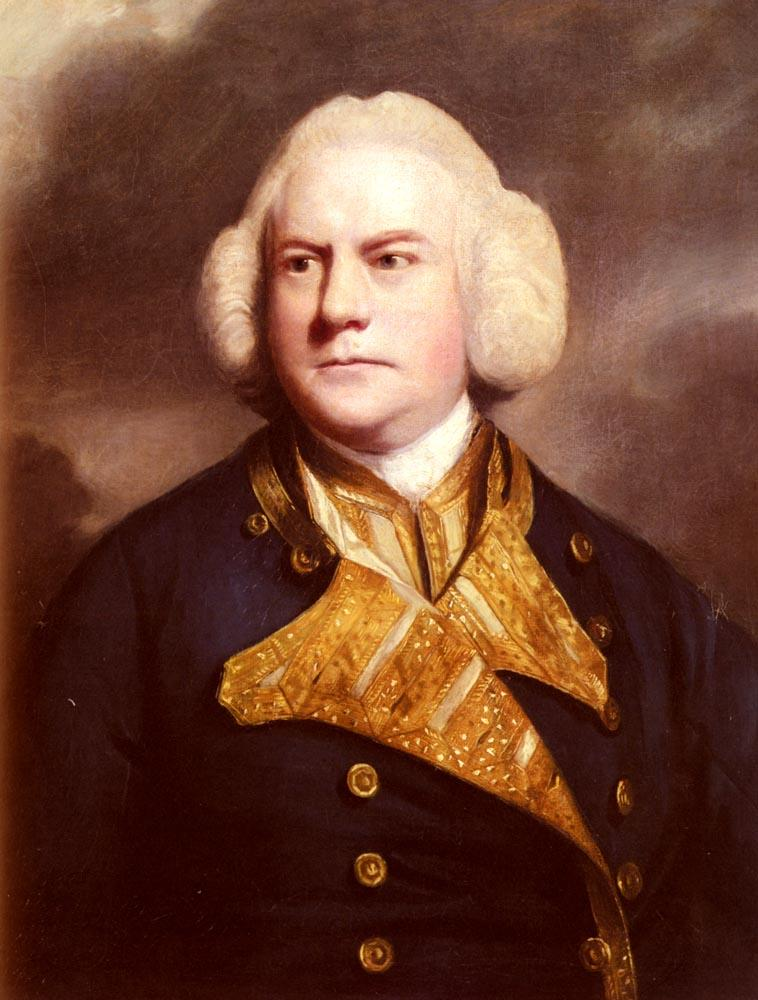
Thomas Cotes (Royal Navy officer) born 4 June

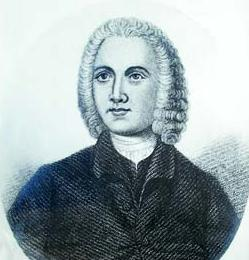
Benjamin Ingham born 11 June

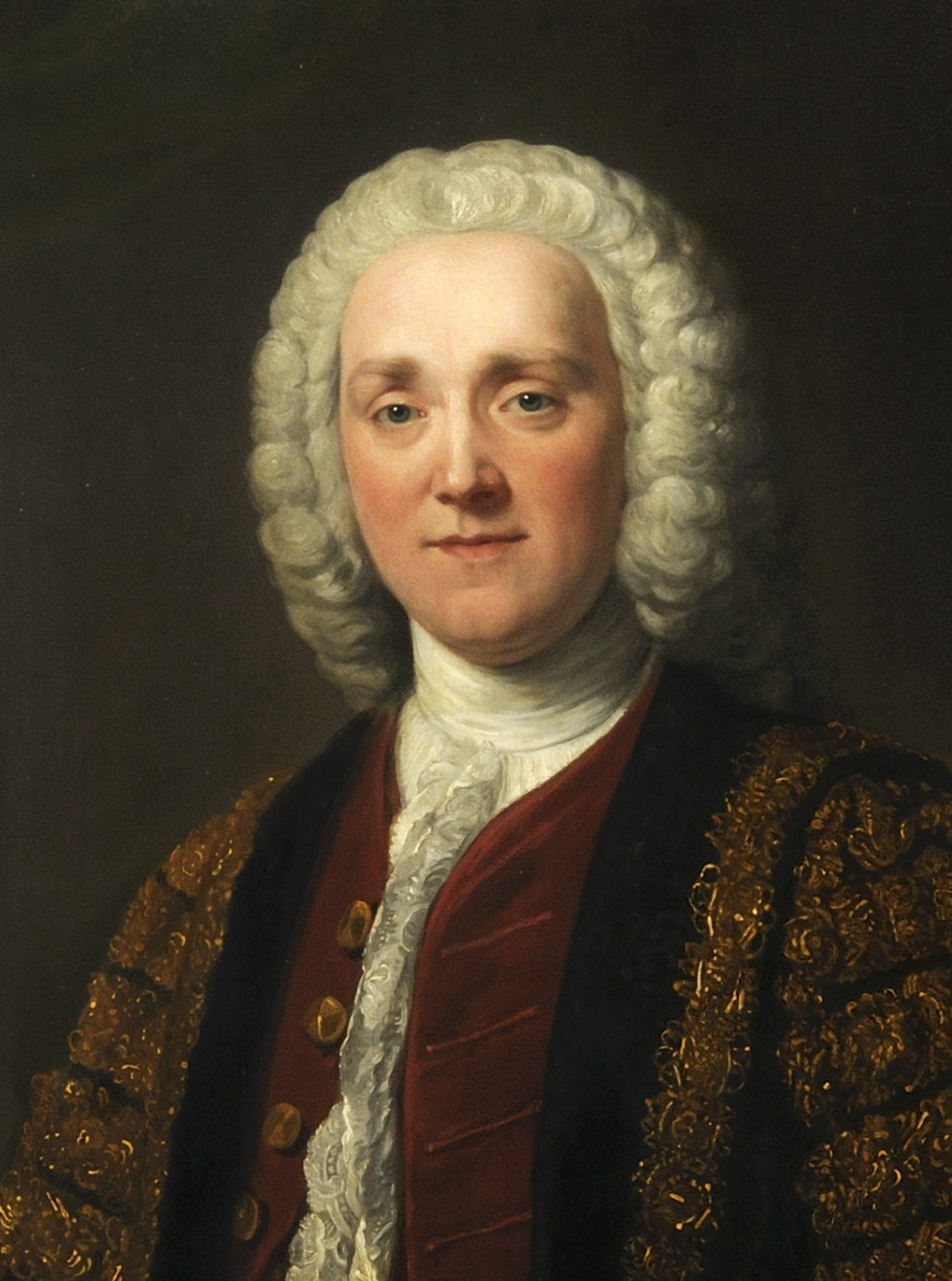
George Grenville born 14 October

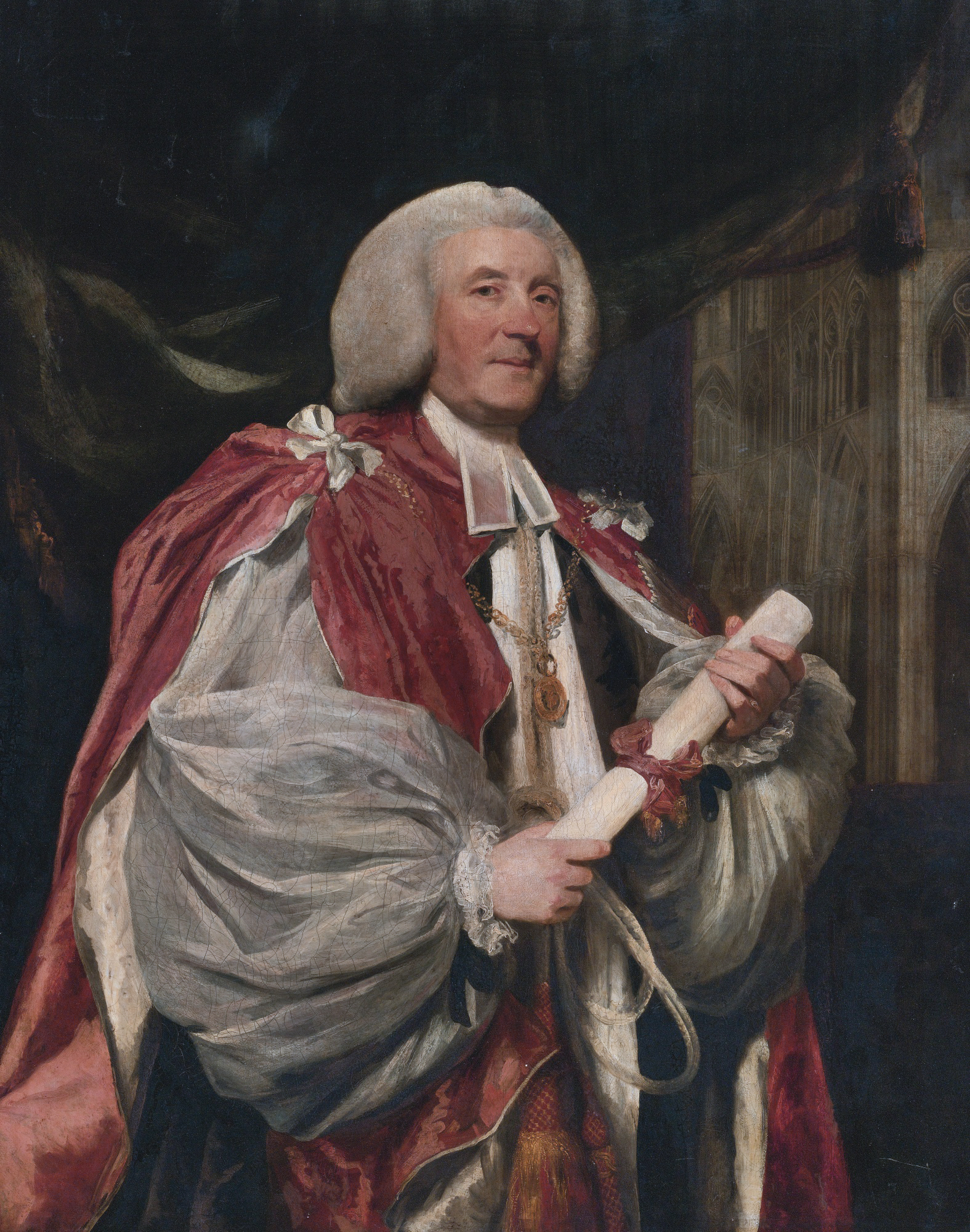
John Thomas (bishop of Rochester) born 14 October

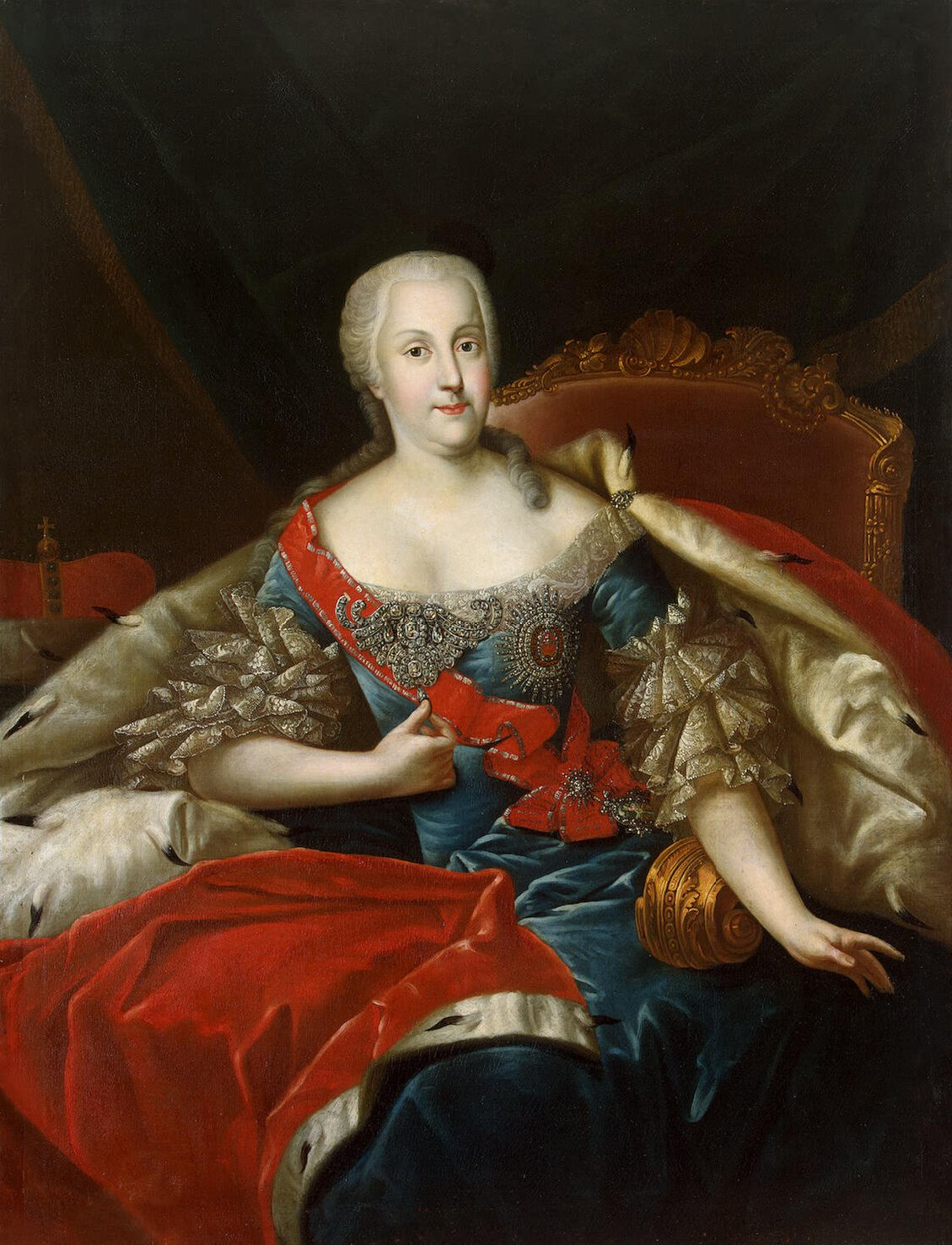
Joanna Elisabeth of Holstein-Gottorp born 24 October

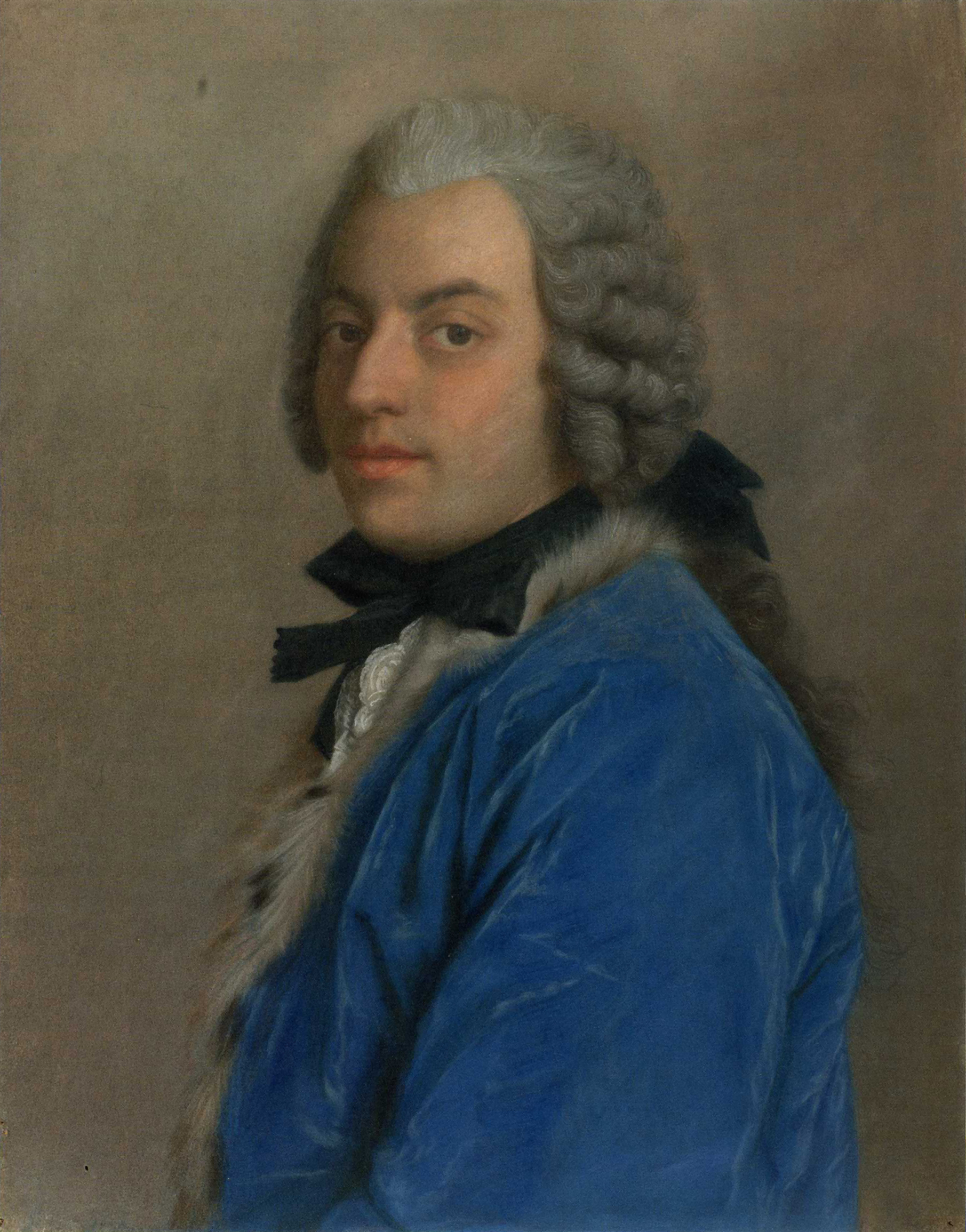
Francesco Algarotti born 11 December

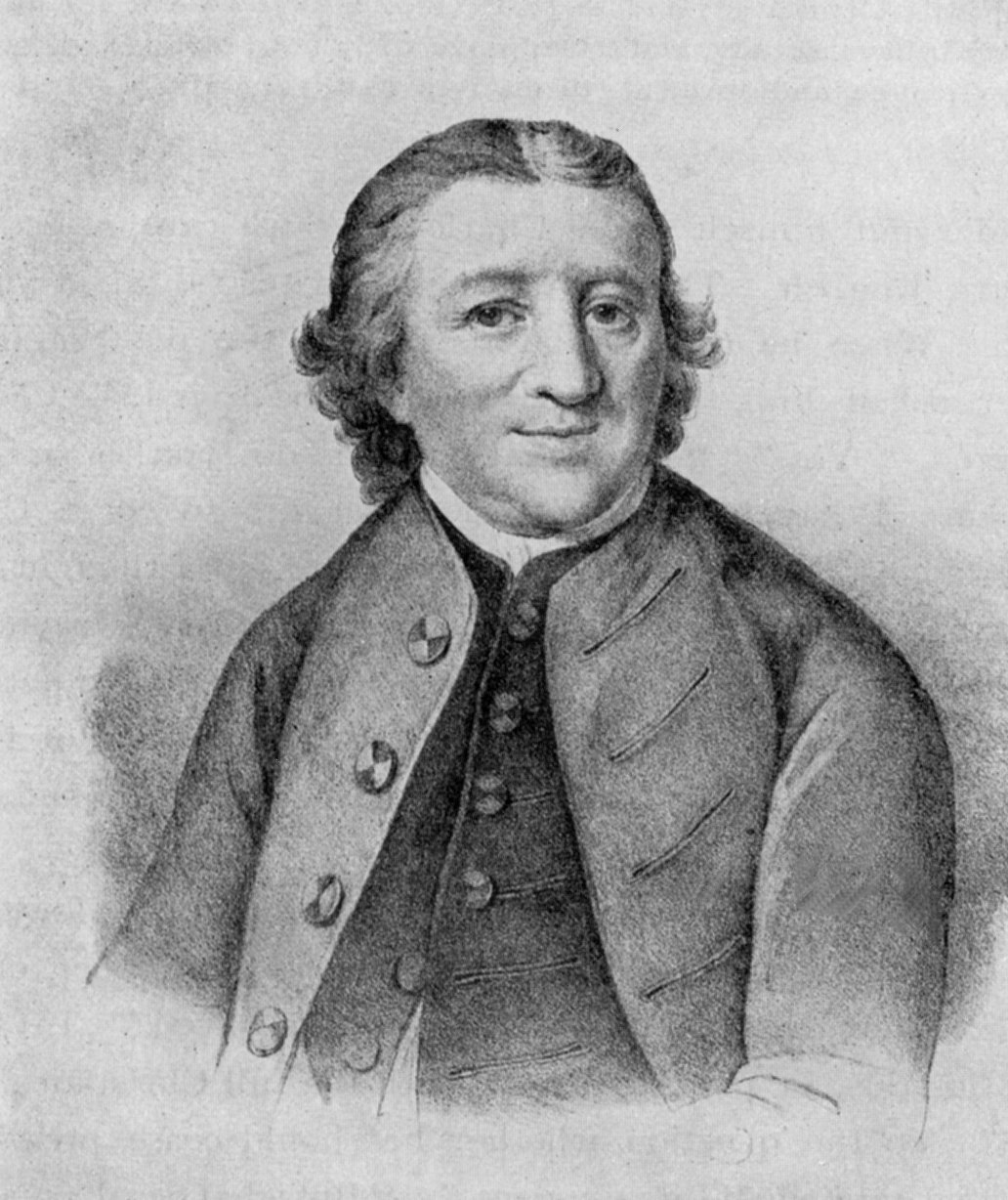
Peter Boehler born 31 December

=== January–March ===
- January 1 – Sir Richard Acton, 5th Baronet, English baronet (d. 1791)
- January 2 – Marie-Angélique Memmie Le Blanc, French feral child (d. 1775)
- January 5
  - Ludwig van Beethoven the Elder, Flemish-born German professional singer and music director, grandfather of the well known composer of the same name (d. 1773)
  - Hongzhou, Manchu prince of the Qing dynasty (d. 1770)
- January 17 – John Stanley, English composer and organist (d. 1786)
- January 24
  - Frederick the Great, King of Prussia (1740–1786) (d. 1786)
  - Charles Moore, 1st Earl of Charleville, Irish peer (d. 1764)
  - Georg Friedrich Schmidt, German engraver and designer (d. 1775)
- January 26 – James Habersham, merchant and statesman in the British North American colony of Georgia (d. 1775)
- January 28 – Tokugawa Ieshige, ninth shōgun of the Tokugawa shogunate of Japan (d. 1761)
- January 29 – Ralph Bigland, English officer of arms (d. 1784)
- February 2 – Lydia Taft, American suffragist (d. 1778)
- February 12 – Felton Hervey, aristocratic English politician (d. 1773)
- February 19 – Arthur Devis, English painter (d. 1787)
- February 20 – Sir Cordell Firebrace, 3rd Baronet, English landowner and politician (d. 1759)
- February 22 – Péter Bod, Hungarian theologian and historian (d. 1768)
- February 26 – Nasir Jung, Nizam of Hyderabad State (d. 1750)
- February 28 – Louis-Joseph de Montcalm, French general (d. 1759)
- March 4 – Joachim Friedrich Henckel, Prussian surgeon at Charité hospital in Berlin (d. 1779)
- March 8 – John Fothergill, British botanist (d. 1780)
- March 12
  - Sir Hew Dalrymple, 2nd Baronet, Scottish politician and MP for Haddington Burghs on two occasions (d. 1790)
  - Ioan II Mavrocordat, prince of Moldva (d. 1747)
- March 14 – Charles-Antoine Jombert, French bookseller and publisher (d. 1784)
- March 15 – Lambert Krahe, German history painter and art collector (d. 1790)
- March 19
  - Joseph Frye, American general (d. 1794)
  - Henry Gervais, Anglican priest in Ireland (d. 1790)
- March 22 – Edward Moore, English dramatist (d. 1757)
- March 27
  - Claude Bourgelat, French veterinary surgeon (d. 1779)
  - Jane Mecom, American correspondent, youngest sister of Benjamin Franklin and one of his closest confidants (d. 1794)
- March 28 – Empress Xiaoxianchun, empress consort of Qing dynasty China (d. 1748)
- March 31 – Anders Johan von Höpken, Swedish politician (d. 1789)

=== April–June ===
- April 8 – Pierre Pouchot, French military engineer officer (d. 1769)
- April 23 – Devasahayam Pillai, beatified Indian Catholic (d. 1752)
- April 28 – James Hewitt, 1st Viscount Lifford, Lord Chancellor of Ireland (d. 1789)
- May 2 – Thomas Bond, American physician and surgeon (d. 1784)
- May 5 – Janusz Aleksander Sanguszko, magnate in the Polish-Lithuanian Commonwealth (d. 1775)
- May 9 – William Pitcairn, Scottish physician and botanist (d. 1791)
- May 12 – Charles William Frederick, Margrave of Brandenburg-Ansbach (d. 1757)
- May 13 – Count Johann Hartwig Ernst von Bernstorff, German-Danish statesman (d. 1772)
- May 17 – Jean-Baptiste Greppo, French canon and archaeologist (d. 1767)
- May 18 – Increase Moseley, American politician (d. 1795)
- May 27 – Sir Thomas Cave, 5th Baronet of England (d. 1778)
- May 28 – Jacques Claude Marie Vincent de Gournay, French economist (d. 1759)
- May 29 – Thomas Dimsdale, English physician, banker (d. 1800)
- June 4 – Thomas Cotes, British Royal Navy officer, Commander-in-Chief of the Jamaica Station (d. 1767)
- June 7 – Infante Philip of Spain, Spanish infante (d. 1719)
- June 11 – Benjamin Ingham, American missionary (d. 1772)
- June 14
  - Samuel Blair, Ulster-born American pastor (d. 1751)
  - Sayat-Nova, Armenian musician and poet (d. 1795)
- June 15 – Andrew Gordon, Scottish Benedictine monk (d. 1751)
- June 21 – Luc Urbain de Bouëxic, comte de Guichen, French admiral (d. 1790)
- June 22 – Michael Heltzen, Norwegian mining engineer (d. 1770)
- June 25 – Exupere Joseph Bertin, French anatomist (d. 1781)
- June 26 – Johann Andreas Silbermann, German organ-builder (d. 1783)
- June 28 – Jean-Jacques Rousseau, Genevan philosopher (d. 1778)

=== July–September ===
- July 4 – George Hadow, British historian (d. 1780)
- July 9 – Charles-Étienne Pesselier, French playwright and librettist (d. 1763)
- July 12
  - Sir Francis Bernard, 1st Baronet, British Colonial governor of New Jersey and Massachusetts Bay (d. 1779)
  - Thomas Estcourt Cresswell, English politician (d. 1788)
- July 18 – Karl Frederick, Duke of Saxe-Meiningen, German noble (d. 1743)
- July 19 – Carl Fredrik Mennander, Swedish bishop (d. 1786)
- July 21 – Johann Karl Philipp von Cobenzl, Habsburg politician (d. 1770)
- July 24 – Richard Handcock, Irish priest (d. 1791)
- July 25 – Vincenzo Miotti, Italian physicist and astronomer (d. 1787)
- July 26
  - George Montagu, 1st Duke of Montagu, English peer (d. 1790)
  - William Pery, 1st Baron Glentworth, Anglican bishop (d. 1794)
- July 31 – Johann Samuel König, German mathematician (d. 1757)
- August 2 – Prince George of Kartli, Georgian prince (d. 1786)
- August 12
  - Jonas Hanway, English traveller and philanthropist (d. 1786)
  - Karl Jakob Weber, Italian archaeologist (d. 1764)
- August 15 – César Gabriel de Choiseul, French officer (d. 1785)
- August 24 – Michel-Barthélémy Ollivier, French painter and engraver (d. 1784)
- August 26 – Tadeusz Franciszek Ogiński, Polish noble (d. 1783)
- August 27 – William Graham, 2nd Duke of Montrose, member of the peerage of Scotland, son of James Graham (d. 1790)
- August 30 – George Montgomerie, British Member of Parliament (d. 1766)
- September 4 – Jan Verbruggen, Dutch master gun-founder in the Netherlands and later at the Royal Arsenal in Woolwich (d. 1781)
- September 11 – Giovanni Targioni Tozzetti, Italian naturalist (d. 1783)
- September 15 – Pierre Simon Fournier, French punch-cutter (d. 1768)
- September 22 – François-Joseph-Gaston de Partz de Pressy, French cleric (d. 1789)
- September 25 – James Veitch, Lord Elliock, Scottish politician (d. 1793)
- September 26
  - Alexander Hamilton, Scottish-born doctor and writer in colonial Maryland (d. 1756)
  - Dominique de La Rochefoucauld, French Catholic cardinal (d. 1800)

=== October–December ===
- October 1 – William Shippen Sr., American physician, anatomist and public figure (d. 1801)
- October 5 – Francesco Guardi, Italian painter (d. 1793)
- October 8 – Alison Cockburn, Scottish poet (d. 1794)
- October 14
  - George Grenville, Prime Minister of Great Britain (1763–1765) (d. 1770)
  - John Thomas, English churchman (Dean of Westminster, Bishop of Rochester) (d. 1793)
- October 15 – Leslie Corry, Irish politician (d. 1741)
- October 17
  - Landgravine Eleonore of Hesse-Rotenburg, countess (d. 1759)
  - Age Wijnalda, Dutch Mennonite minister (d. 1792)
- October 18 – Jeremias van Riemsdijk, Dutch colonial governor (d. 1777)
- October 19
  - Pedro, Prince of Brazil, second child of John V of Portugal and Maria Ana of Austria (d. 1714)
  - Zenobia Revertera, Italian noble and courtier (d. 1779)
- October 20 – Gregor Zallwein, Bavarian-born expert on canon law (d. 1766)
- October 21 – James Steuart, Scottish economist (d. 1780)
- October 22 – James Hamilton, 8th Earl of Abercorn, member of the peerage of Scotland and landowner in Ireland (d. 1789)
- October 24
  - Joanna Elisabeth of Holstein-Gottorp, German duchess (d. 1760)
  - Jonathan Nichols Jr., Rhode Island colonial deputy governor (d. 1756)
- October 29 – Paolo Gamba, Italian painter (d. 1782)
- October 30
  - Christian Wilhelm Ernst Dietrich, German painter and art administrator (d. 1774)
  - Giovanni Pietro Francesco Agius de Soldanis, Maltese linguist, historian and cleric (d. 1770)
- October 31 – Prince Moritz of Anhalt-Dessau, German prince of the House of Ascania (d. 1760)
- November 4
  - Charles de Fitz-James, Marshal of France (d. 1787)
  - Charles Louis de Marbeuf, French general (d. 1786)
- November 7 – Antoine Choquet de Lindu, French architect (d. 1790)
- November 11 – Hugolín Gavlovič, Slovak Franciscan priest, author of religious, moral and educational writings (d. 1787)
- November 20 – Guillaume Voiriot, French portrait painter (d. 1799)
- November 24
  - Ali II ibn Hussein, fourth leader of the Husainid Dynasty, ruler of Tunisia (d. 1782)
  - Charles-Michel de l'Épée, French priest and educator of the deaf (d. 1789)
- November 27 – Fernando de Sousa e Silva, fourth Patriarch of Lisbon (d. 1786)
- December 1 – George Boscawen, British Army general and politician (d. 1775)
- December 3
  - Joseph Relph, English poet (d. 1743)
  - William Sawyer, English professional cricketer (d. 1761)
- December 9 – Alexander Murray of Elibank, Scottish Jacobite intriguer, fourth son of Alexander Murray (d. 1778)
- December 11 – Francesco Algarotti, Venetian philosopher (d. 1764)
- December 12
  - Prince Charles Alexander of Lorraine, Lorraine-born Austrian general and soldier (d. 1780)
  - François-Antoine Devaux, Lorraine-born poet and man of letters (d. 1796)
  - John Turner, Massachusetts politician and delegate from Pembroke (d. 1794)
- December 25 – Pietro Chiari, Italian playwright (d. 1785)
- December 31
  - Peter Boehler, German-English Moravian bishop and missionary (d. 1775)
  - Charles, Prince of Nassau-Usingen (1718–1775) and Nassau-Saarbrücken (1728–1735) (d. 1775)

== Deaths ==
- January 5 – Richard Jones, 1st Earl of Ranelagh, Irish politician (b. 1641)
- January 10 – John Houblon, first Governor of the Bank of England (1694-1697) (b. 1632)
- February 2 – Martin Lister, English naturalist, physician (b. c. 1638)
- February 12 – Marie Adélaïde of Savoy, wife of Louis, Duke of Burgundy (b. 1685)
- February 18 – Louis, duc de Bourgogne, heir to the throne of France (b. 1682)
- February 22 – Nicolas Catinat, French military commander and Marshal of France under Louis XIV (b. 1637)
- February 27 – Bahadur Shah I, Mughal Emperor of India (b. 1643)
- March 2 – Lorenzo Magalotti, Italian philosopher (b. 1637)
- March 18 – Azim-ush-Shan, Mughal prince (b. 1664)
- March 25 – Nehemiah Grew, English naturalist (b. 1641)

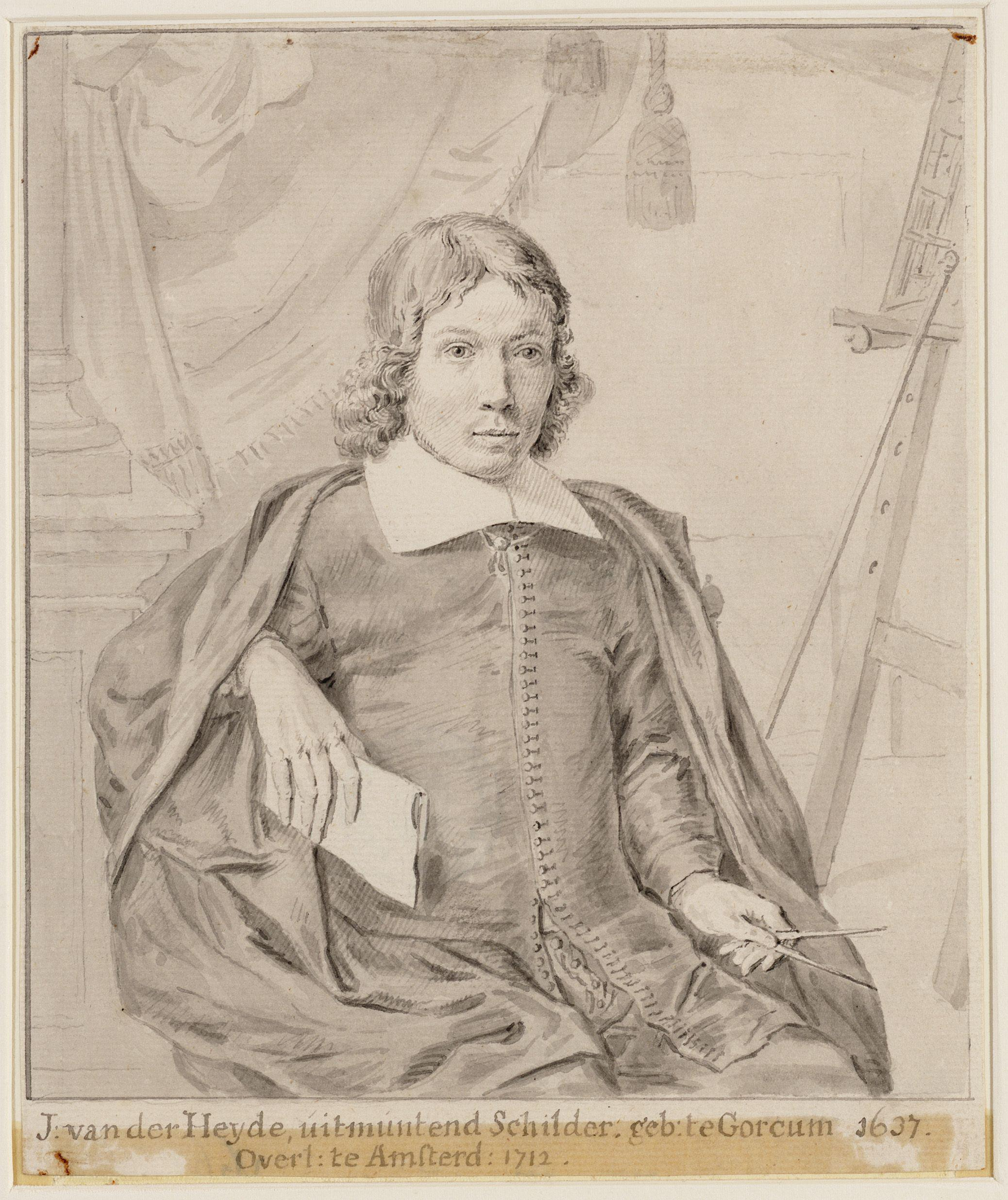
Jan van der Heyden

- March 28 – Jan van der Heyden, Dutch painter (b. 1637)
- March 30 – Johann Friedrich Mayer, German Lutheran theologian (b. 1650)
- April 9 – Giuseppe Archinto, Italian cardinal, Archbishop of Milan (b. 1651)
- April 11 – Richard Simon, French Biblical critic (b. 1638)
- April 27 – John Crowne, English playwright (b. 1641)
- April 29 – Juan Bautista Cabanilles, Spanish composer (b. 1644)
- April 30 – Philipp van Limborch, Dutch Protestant theologian (b. 1633)
- May 6 – Henric Piccardt, Dutch lawyer (b. 1636)
- May 20 – Christian Ernst, Margrave of Brandenburg-Bayreuth (1655–1712) (b. 1644)
- June 10 – Christian Franz Paullini, German physician (b. 1643)
- June 11 – Louis Joseph, Duke of Vendôme, French military commander (b. 1654)
- June 24 – Simon van der Stel, last Commander and first Governor of the Cape Colony (b. 1639)
- July – Baltacı Mehmet Pasha, Ottoman (Turkish) grand vizier (b. 1662)
- July 1 – William King, English poet (b. 1663)
- July 4 – Johann Kasimir Kolbe von Wartenberg, Prussian politician (b. 1643)

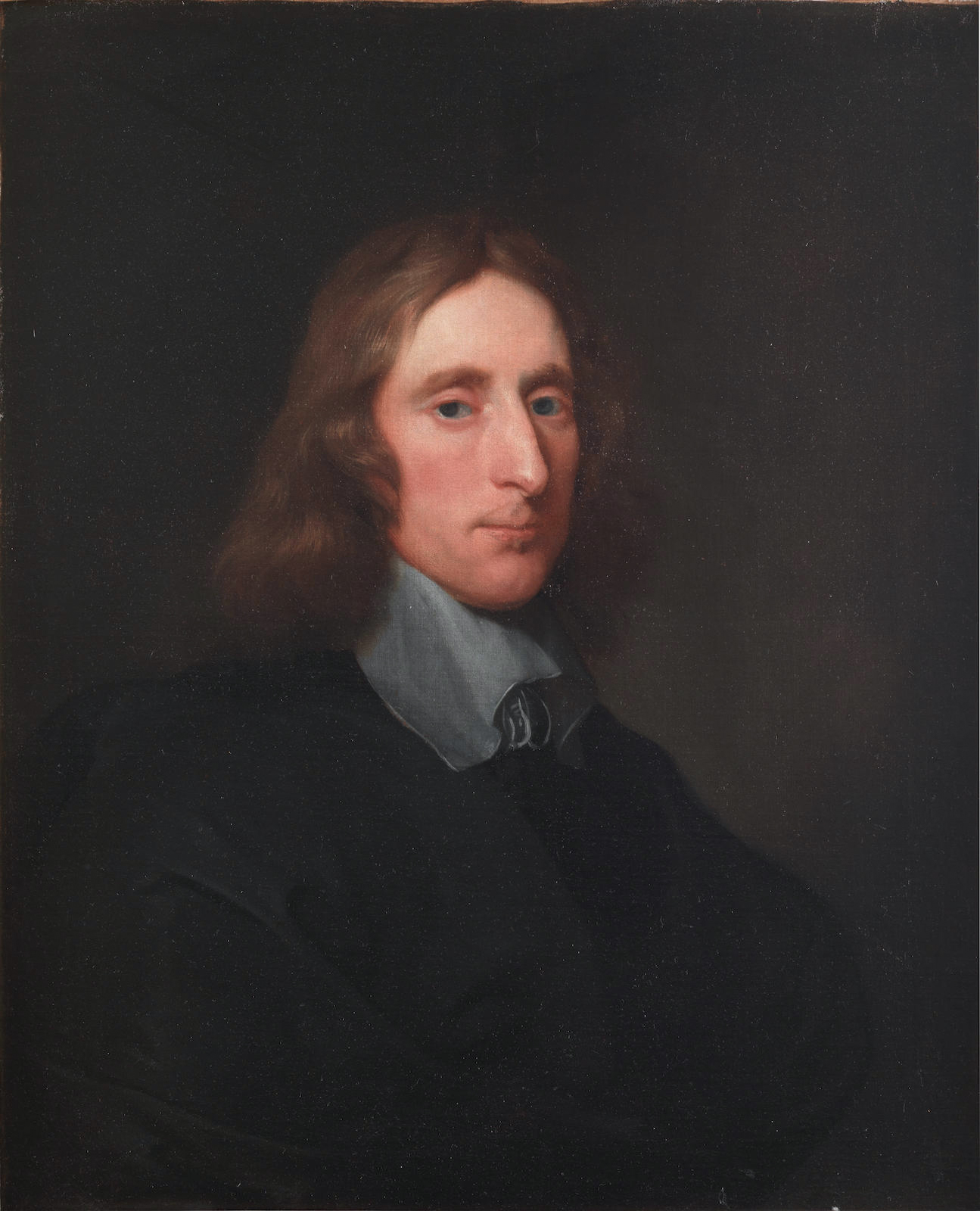
Richard Cromwell

- July 12 – Richard Cromwell, Lord Protector of England, Scotland, and Ireland (b. 1626)
- July 13 – Isaac de Porthau, Gascon black musketeer of the Maison du Roi (b. 1617)
- July 28 – Theodorus Janssonius van Almeloveen, Dutch classical scholar (b. 1657)
- July 26 – Thomas Osborne, 1st Duke of Leeds, English statesman (b. 1631)
- August 3 – Joshua Barnes, English scholar (b. 1654)
- August 7 – Friedrich Wilhelm Zachow, German composer (b. 1663)
- August 11 – Magdalena Sibylla of Hesse-Darmstadt, German regent (b. 1652)
- August 18 – Richard Savage, 4th Earl Rivers, English soldier (b. c. 1660)
- August 26 – Sebastian Anton Scherer, German organist and composer (b. 1631)
- August 29 – Gregory King, English statistician (b. 1648)
- September 9 – Edward Hyde, Governor of North Carolina (b. c. 1650)

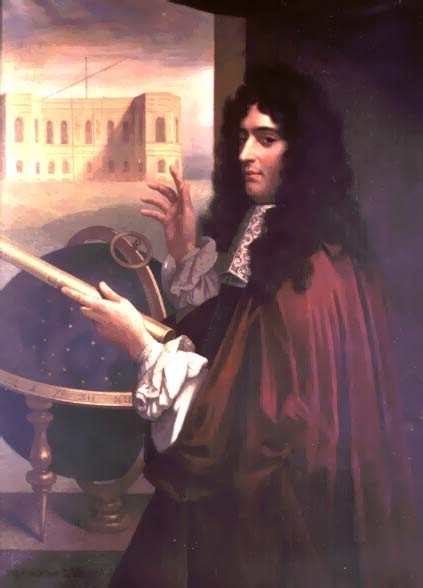
Giovanni Domenico Cassini

- September 14 – Giovanni Domenico Cassini, Italian-French astronomer and engineer (b. 1625)
- September 15 – Sidney Godolphin, 1st Earl of Godolphin, English politician (b. c.1645)
- September 23 – Thomas Halyburton, Scottish theologian (b. 1674)
- October 4 – Philip Reinhard, Count of Hanau-Münzenberg (b. 1664)
- October 25 – Ōkubo Tadatomo, Japanese daimyō (b. 1632)
- October 30 – Daniel Erich, German organist and composer (b. 1649)
- November 5 – Charles Honoré d'Albert, duc de Luynes, French noble (b. 1646)
- November 12 – Tokugawa Ienobu, Japanese Edo shōgun (b. 1662)
- November 15
  - James Hamilton, 4th Duke of Hamilton, Scottish peer (b. 1658)
  - Charles Mohun, 4th Baron Mohun, English politician (b. 1675)
- November 19 – Wolfgang Carl Briegel, German organist and composer (b. 1626)
- November 20 – Humphrey Humphreys, British bishop (b. 1648)
- November 26 – Pietro Dandini, Italian painter (b. 1646)
- November 30 – Sir Henry Furnese, 1st Baronet, English merchant and politician (b. 1658)

=== Unknown date ===
- William Joliffe, English politician (b. 1622)
