= Weißgerber =

Weißgerber or Weissgerber is a German language occupational surname for a tanner and may refer to:

- Andreas Weißgerber (1900–1941), Austrian-Hungarian violinist
- Josip Weissgerber (1922–1985), Croatian Jesuit, philosopher, writer and missionary
- Katharine Weißgerber (1818–1886), German humanitarian
- Leo Weissgerber (1899–1985), German linguist
- Tycho Weißgerber (1952), German fencer
