= Wessobrunn Abbey =

Benedictine monastery near Wessobrunn, Bavaria, Germany

Coordinates: 47°53′N 11°02′E

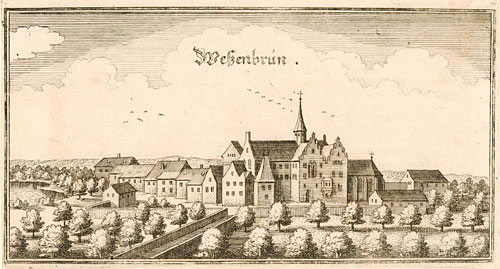
Wessobrunn Abbey 1640 (anonymous print)

Wessobrunn Abbey (Kloster Wessobrunn) was a Benedictine monastery near Weilheim in Bavaria, Germany.

It is celebrated as the home of the famous Wessobrunn Prayer and also of a Baroque school of stucco workers and plasterers in the 18th century.

== History ==
The monastery was founded in 753. According to legend, it was founded after Duke Tassilo III of Bavaria, while hunting nearby, had a vision of three springs, which his servant Wezzo duly discovered the next day. (The name means Wesso or Wezzo's spring(s)). The three springs are still to be seen, but there is otherwise no evidence of the truth of the story. It is likely that the founders were a local noble family called Rott.

The first monks came from Niederaltaich Abbey under Ilsung, the first abbot. The church was dedicated to Saints Peter and Paul. During the rule of the second abbot, Adelmar (799–831), the monastery was transferred from the Diocese of Brixen to that of Augsburg.

In 788 Wessobrunn became a Carolingian Empire Imperial abbey (i.e., independent of other terrorial lordships and answerable only to the monarchy) In about 900 it became a property of the Bishop of Augsburg.

In 955 the abbey was destroyed by the Hungarians, on which occasion Abbot Thiente and six of his monks suffered martyrdom, while the remaining three fled to Andechs with the sacred relics. The site was then occupied by canons until 1065, when the provost Adalbero restored the Rule of St. Benedict and governed as abbot until his death in 1110. In the first year of his abbacy the monastic church was rebuilt and was dedicated by Bishop Embrico of Augsburg.

Adalbero was succeeded by Sigihard (1110–28), during whose reign a separate church was built for the people of the surrounding area, dedicated to Saint John the Baptist in 1128.

Under Blessed Waltho (1129–57) Wessobrunn enjoyed its first era of great spiritual and temporal prosperity. He was responsible for a number of unusually fine buildings. Also under Waltho the nunnery attached to the abbey between about 1100 and 1220 was of note as the home of Blessed Wulfhildis and Diemoth.

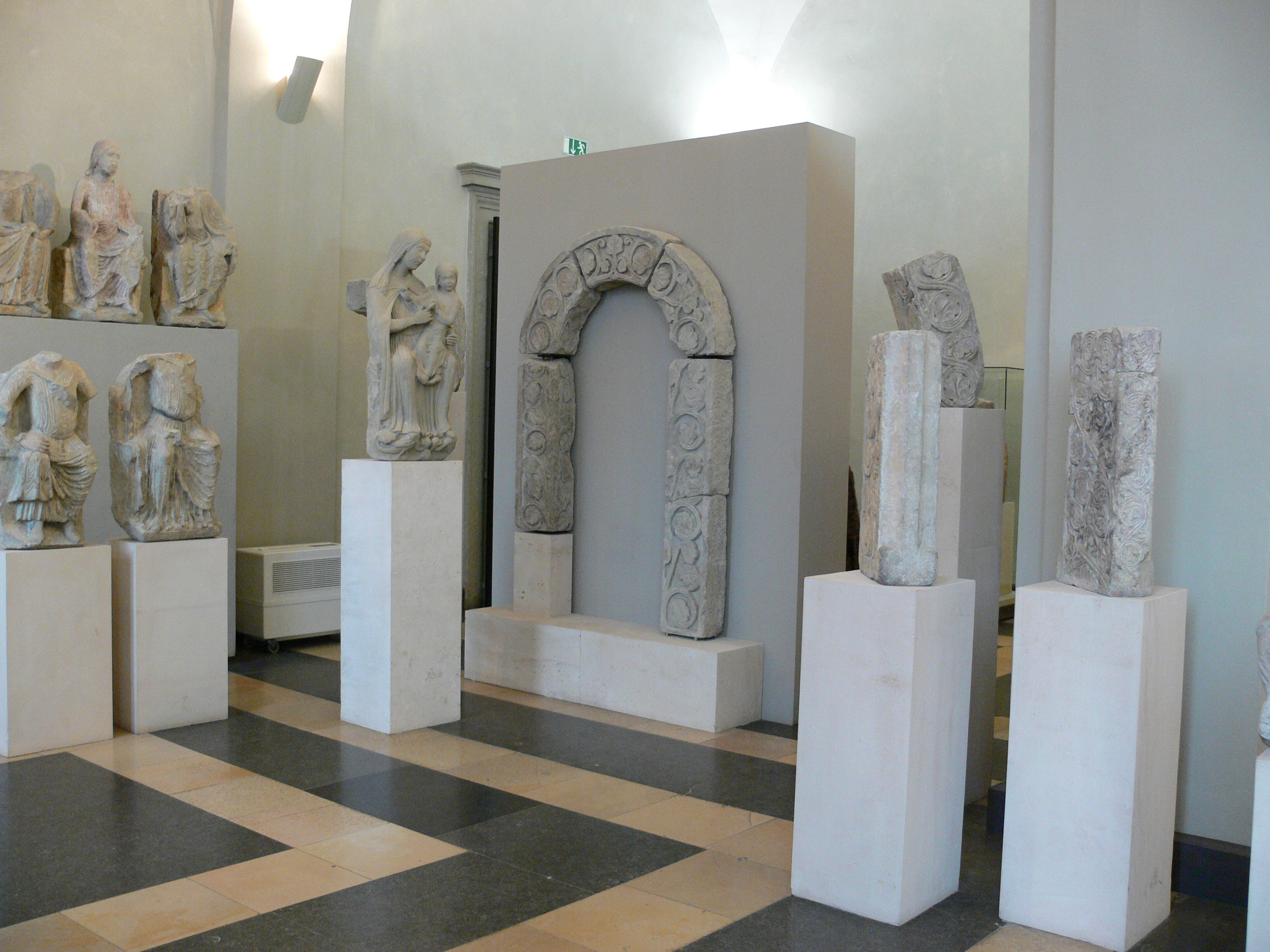
Fragments of medieval sculpture from the former abbey church, now in the Bavarian National Museum

In or around 1220 the church burnt down, and the monastery complex was extensively rebuilt at this time.

In 1401 the abbots of Wessobrunn were granted the right of pontifical insignia. A new era of great prosperity began with the accession of Ulrich Stocklin (1438–43), who had previously been a monk at Tegernsee Abbey and acquired considerable fame as a writer of sacred hymns. Abbot Heinrich Zach (1498–1508) installed a printing press at the monastery.

In 1680 Abbot Leonard Weiss (1671–96) began the rebuilding of the church and monastery on a far more lavish scale in the Baroque style, using the abbey's own stuccoists. He was also instrumental in the formation of the Bavarian Congregation in 1684 and joined his abbey to it.

The abbey was dissolved in 1803 in the course of the secularisation of Bavaria, when it came into the possession of a certain De Montot. From 1810 the site was extensively exploited for building materials to rebuild the nearby town of Weilheim, which had been damaged in a fire. What remained in 1861 was saved by Professor Johann Nepomuk Sepp, who bought the site and preserved it. In 1900 it was acquired by Baron von Cramer-Klett.

== Literary production ==
From the 16th century to the secularisation of Wessobrunn in 1803, its monks displayed a continuous rare literary activity and some of them acquired fame as authors and teachers in various schools of Germany. Among the best known are: the historians Stephan Leopolder (d. 1532) and Cölestin Leutner (d. 1759); the theologians Thomas Ringmayr (d. 1652), Thomas Erhard (d. 1743), Veremund Eisvogl (d. 1761), Alphonse Campi (d. 1769), Ulrich Mittermayr (d. 1770), Virgil Sedlmayr (d. 1772), Sympert Schwarzhuber (d. 1795); the canonists Gregor Zallwein (d. 1766) and Johann Kleinmayern (the last abbot of Wessobrunn; d. 1810); and the librarian and scientist Anselm Ellinger (d. 1816). Among these Leutner, Campi, Eisvogl, and Mittermayr collaborated in the edition of a large concordance of the Bible which was published in 1751.

== Wessobrunn Prayer ==
This famous piece of Christian literature was not produced at Wessobrunn itself but was preserved in the monastic library for centuries, until at the secularisation the library contents were transferred to the Bavarian State Library, where the manuscript is now located.

== See also ==
- Carolingian art
- List of Carolingian monasteries
- Wessobrunner School
- Wolfsindis of Reisbach
