= Miotti =

Miotti is an Italian surname. Notable people with the surname include:

- Domingo Miotti (born 1996), Argentine rugby union player
- Vincenzo Miotti (1712–1787), Italian physicist and astronomer
