= Schwarzenholz =

District of Saarwellingen, Saarland, Germany

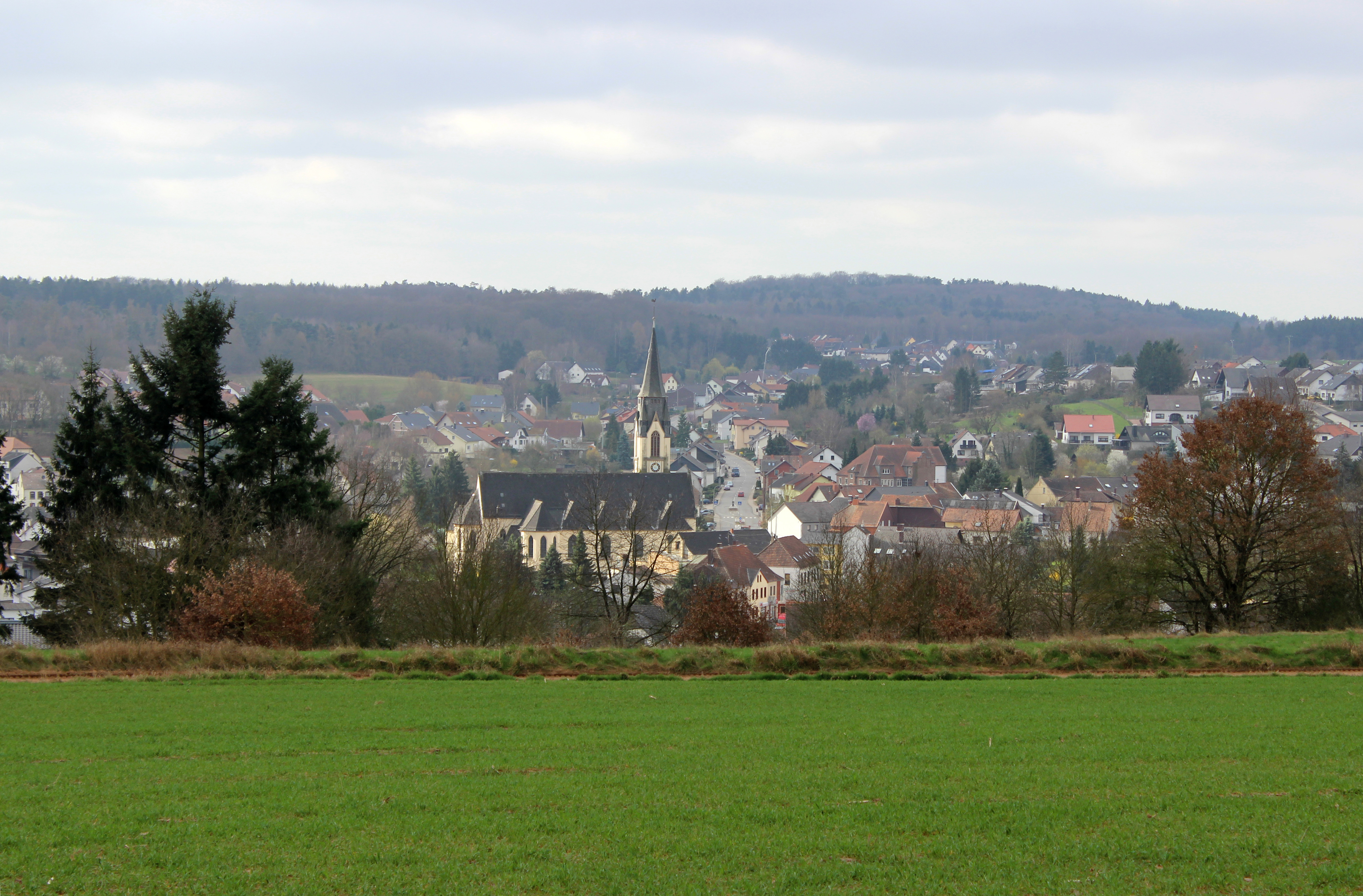
Schwarzenholz

Schwarzenholz is the second largest district of the municipality of Saarwellingen in Saarland, Germany.

== History ==
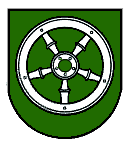
Coat of arms of Schwarzenholtz

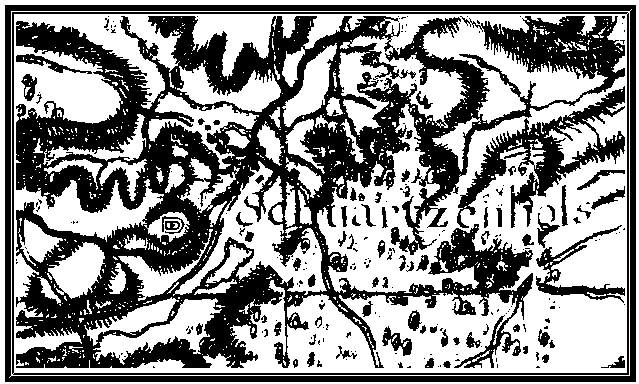
Drawing of a 1737 map of the town of Schwarzenholz.

From the Middle Ages Schwarzenholz was owned by Fraulautern Abbey, which had been granted Imperial immediacy because its possessions in Schwarzenholz after a trial in the highest Imperial court, the Reichskammergericht.

The most famous daughter of the village is Katharine Weißgerber, called Schultze Kathrin, the Good Samaritan of the Battle of Spichern in early August 1870.

== Etymology ==
The last part of the word -olc or -holc denotes a fenced gentleman while the first part names the owner from the time of the first settlement: Suarto. Suarcenholc was therefore the enclosed master of the Suartos.

In various documents (gift and purchase certificates of the abbey Fraulautern ) from the period 1235-1279 is the name: Suarcenholf, Suarcenoth, Swarcenholc, Suarzenhoch, Suarzenholch.

== Geography ==
Schwarzenholz has a healthy village structure and is an attractive residential area surrounded by forests, and has direct motorway access to the A 8, so that the larger cities in the area (Saarbrücken, Neunkirchen, Saarlouis, Dillingen, Merzig, Völklingen) and the neighbouring countries France and Luxembourg are all reachable in 30 minutes or less.

Two general practitioners, a dentist, two banks, two grocery stores, two hairdressing salons, a bakery, a butchery, eight catering establishments, two driving schools, two florists, a stationery shop with post office, a car repair shop, a travel agency, a carpentry, an interior decorator and many other companies can be found in town. Next to the kindergarten is the school building of the former elementary school, which closed its doors in 2008; since then, the children of Schwarzenholz have to take the bus to Reisbach, where the Astrid Lindgren Elementary School is located. The place has a multi-purpose hall, named after Schultze Kathrin, another sports hall and an artificial turf pitch, on which the football team FV 1929 Schwarzenholz e. V. play their matches.

Other sports clubs are the gymnastics club, the table tennis club and the cycling club Spanische Bergziege ("Spanish mountain goats"). Cultural associations include the Musikverein Harmonie and the men's choral society "Deutsche Eintracht".

The parish church of St. Bartholomew in the Bartholomäusstrasse is a protected monument and was built in 1914-1915 by Ludwig Becker and Anton Falkowski.

== Politics ==
The mayor of Schwarzenholz has been Josef Werth (SPD) since the last local election, whose party holds six of the eleven seats in the local council and thus the absolute majority of the seats; his deputy is Rudi Schmitt (SPD). The CDU won three seats in the local elections in 2009; the FWG and the left have one each.

== Parish Church ==
St. Bartholomew is the name of a parish and parish and the associated parish church in Saarwellingen district Schwarzenholz. The Parish and church belong to the Diocese of Trier and, the church is heritage listed as a single monument.
