= Johann Nepomuk Sepp =

German historian and politician (1816-1909)

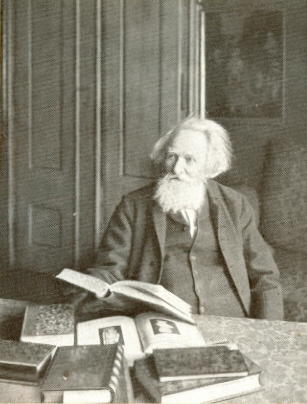
Johann Nepomuk Sepp

Johann Nepomuk Sepp (7 August 1816 – 5 June 1909) was a German historian and politician, and a native of Bavaria.

== Life ==
Johann Nepomuk Sepp was born in Bad Tölz, Bavaria, to a tanner and dyer, Josef Bernhard Sepp and his wife Maria Victoria Oefele. He studied philosophy and Catholic theology, law, philology and history at the Ludwig-Maximilians-Universität München, from 1834 to 1836 and from 1837 to 1839. In 1836, he interrupted his university studies for a trip to Switzerland and Italy, after which he entered the Gregorianum seminary in Munich. In 1839, he was awarded a Ph.D., and established himself as a private scholar in Bad Tölz. From 1844 to 1846, he taught as lecturer at the Ludwig-Maximilians-Universität München.

After he had traveled to Syria, Palestine and Egypt in 1845 and 1846, he was appointed assistant professor at the Ludwig-Maximilians-Universität München in 1846, but was dismissed in 1847, along with seven of his colleagues, as a result of their involvement in opposition to the elevation of Lola Montez, mistress of Ludwig I of Bavaria, to the nobility. Sepp had his teaching qualification withdrawn and was banished from the Bavarian capital.

In 1848, he was elected to the Frankfurt National Assembly, and in 1849 to the Bavarian Chamber of Representatives. In 1850, after the resignation of King Ludwig I of Bavaria, Sepp was rehabilitated, and from 1850 until 1864 and from 1864 until 1867 was associate professor of history at the Ludwig-Maximilians-Universität München. In 1861, he bought the partially destroyed Wessobrunn Abbey, which was then being used as a quarry, in order to preserve it for posterity.

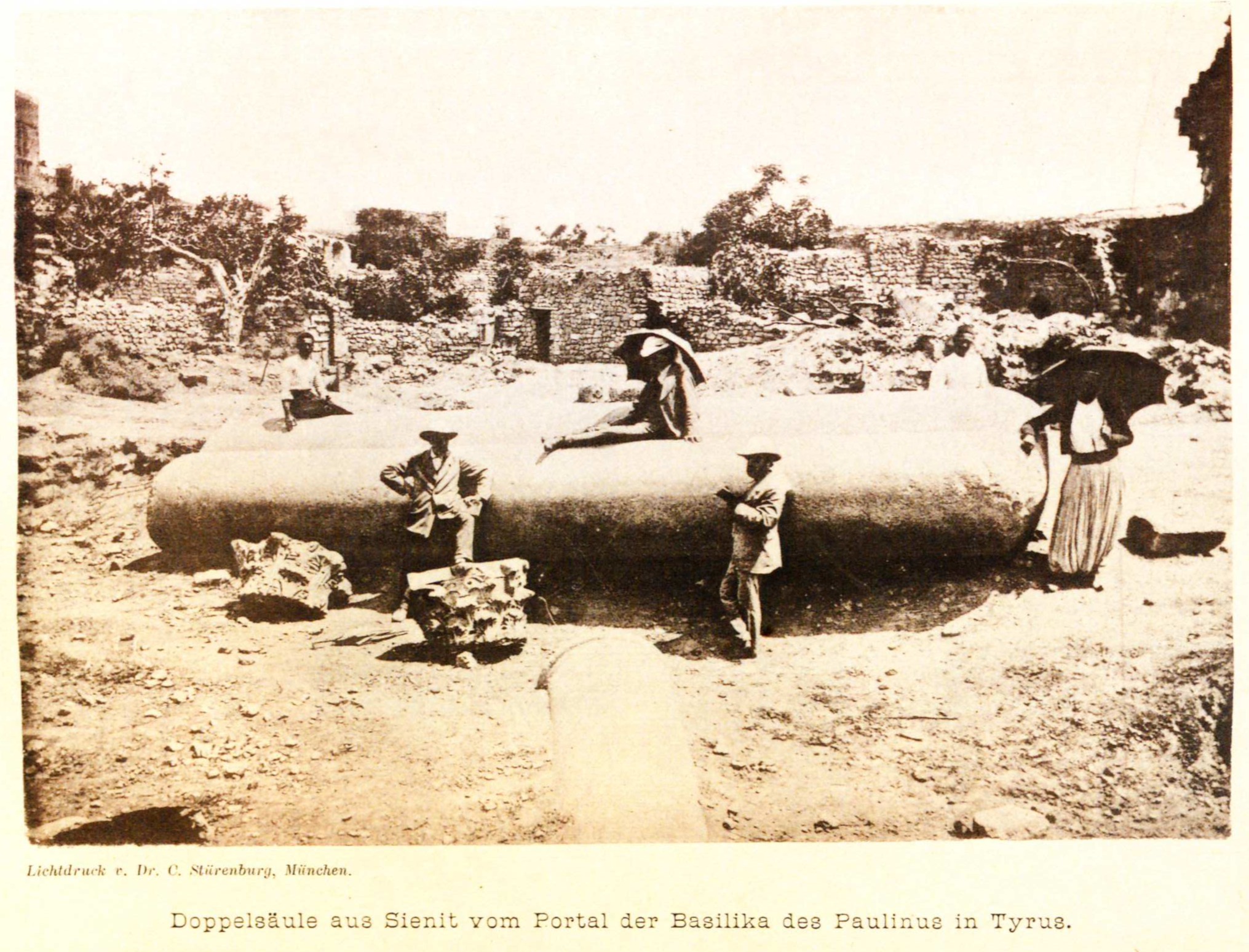
Sepp's expedition to excavate the bones of Holy Roman Emperor Frererick Barbarossa in the ruins of the Cathedral of Tyre, 1874

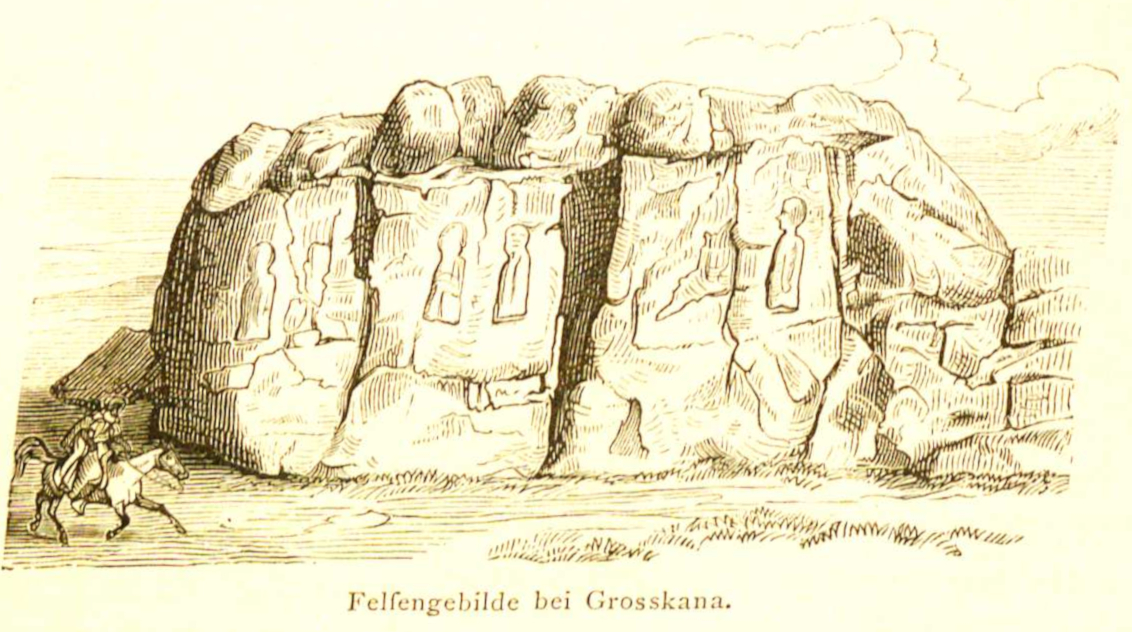
Early-Christian Bas-reliefs of the Apostles in Qana, Lebanon, drawn by Sepp in 1879

Sepp retired suddenly in December 1867 "for personal reasons". He was appointed to the Zollparlament in 1868, and in 1869 again elected to the Bavarian Chamber, where he was one of the most influential representatives of the German national cause during the critical period between 1870 and 1871. In 1872, he undertook a new journey to Palestine on behalf of the new German Empire. In 1874, Sepp went to Tyre, Lebanon to excavate the remains of Frederick Barbarossa buried in a cathedral there, during the reign of German Emperor Wilhelm I.

Sepp was highly literate and a capable publicist. He was sometimes prone to original and idiosyncratic interpretations of history, so was respectfully nicknamed by colleagues "die umgestürzte Bücherkiste" ("the overturned bookcase"). His final major work, his contribution to German folklore, appeared in 1890: "The Religion of the Ancient Germans. Their continued existence in folk tales, processions and festivities to the present". This was a kind of view in hindsight, a compressed, comparative survey of a lifetime of accumulated and processed historical anthropological and religious knowledge; like most of his works, it has not enjoyed a new edition. Still frequently cited today is his study of the myths, legends, customs and manners of Bavaria, the Altbayerischer Sagenschatz of 1876. This work, although heavily compressed and eclectic, attempted an overview of the mythology of Bavaria, with literary references. Sepp also published under the pseudonym "Eusebius Amort der Jüngere".

From the 1830s, Sepp belonged to the circle of Joseph Görres in Munich. In 1847, he was also founder of the Akademische Tafelrunde in Munich. While in the Frankfurt National Assembly he belonged to the Catholic Club, and from 1849 to 1856 to the "Society for Constitutional Monarchy and Religious Freedom in Munich", whose spokesman he was at times.

Johann Nepomuk Sepp was buried in the Alter Südfriedhof in Munich. His tombstone has been preserved.

His son, Bernhard Sepp, was also a historian.

== Selected works ==
- Das Leben Jesu Christi. Regensburg 1842–1846, 7 Bände; 2. Auflage 1853–1862, 6 Bände
- Das Heidenthum und dessen Bedeutung für das Christenthum. Regensburg 1853, 3 Bände
- Thaten und Lehren Jesu mit ihrer weltgeschichtlichen Beglaubigung. Schaffhausen 1864
- Geschichte der Apostel vom Tod Jesu bis zur Zerstörung Jerusalems. 2. Auflage, Schaffhausen 1866
- Das Hebräer-Evangelium oder die Markus- und Matthäus-Frage. Schaffhausen 1870
- Jerusalem und das Heilige Land. Schaffhausen 1862–1863, 2 Bände; 2. Auflage, Regensburg 1872–1876
- Neue architektonische Studien und historisch-topographische Forschungen in Palästina. Würzburg 1867
- Ludwig Augustus, König von Bayern. Schaffhausen 1869
- Deutschland und der Vatikan. Staats- und Volksmännern, sowie Kirchenobern zur ernsten Erwägung. München 1872.
- Altbayerischer Sagenschatz. München 1876
- Görres und seine Zeitgenossen. Nördlingen 1877
- Meerfahrt nach Tyrus zur Ausgrabung der Kathedrale mit Barbarossas Grab. Leipzig 1879
- Ein Volk von zehn Millionen, oder der Bayernstamm. München 1882
- Der bayrische Bauernkrieg mit den Schlachten von Sendling und Aidenbach. München
- Festschrift anläßlich der Enthüllung des Denkmals für Kaspar Winzerer (III) in Bad Tölz. 1887
- Die Religion der alten Deutschen. Ihr Fortbestand in Volkssagen, Aufzügen und Festbräuchen bis zur Gegenwart. München 1890
- Der Schmied von Kochel. Bühnenstücke in 5 Akten, 1898
- Schmiedbalthes. Balthasar Maier im Türkenkriege und der Held in der Sendlinger Bauernschlacht. Gelegentlich der Errichtung seines Monumentes, 1900
- Festschrift zur zweiten Jahrhundertwende der Schlacht bei Sendling. München 1905

== Bibliography ==
- Dr. Joh. Nepomuk Sepp (1816–1909). Ein Bild seines Lebens nach seinen eigenen Aufzeichnungen. 2 volumes. Regensburg 1917
- Heinrich Best and Wilhelm Weege: Biographisches Handbuch der Abgeordneten der Frankfurter Nationalversammlung 1848/49. Düsseldorf 1996, pp. 317f.
- Meyers Konversations-Lexikon. 4th edition 1888–1890, vol. 14, Verlag des Bibliographischen Instituts, Leipzig and Vienna, p. 869 (online version)
- Monika Fink-Lang: „Dem Geiste nach verpflichtet“. Die Görres-Schüler Johann Nepomuk Sepp und Michael Strodl. In: Helmut Flachenecker und Dietmar Grypa (ed.): Schule, Universität und Bildung. Festschrift für Harald Dickerhof zum 65. Geburtstag. Regensburg 2007, pp. 243–293
