= Schachten (disambiguation) =

Schachten is a German word for a type of pasture.

Schacten may also refer to:

== Places in Germany ==
- Schachten (Arnstorf), village in the market borough of Arnstorf, Rottal-Inn, Bavaria
- Schachten (Grebenstein), village in the borough of Grebenstein, Kassel, Hesse
  - Rittergut Schachten, a listed manor estate in the Grebenstein village of Schachten

== People ==
- Sebastian Schachten (born 1984), German footballer
- Werner Schachten (born 1954), German footballer

== See also ==
- Schacht (disambiguation)
