= Katharine Weißgerber =

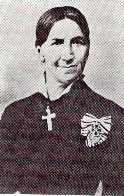
- Katharine Weissgerber
- Born: 3 August 1818; Schwarzenholz, Maienstrasse
- Died: 6 August 1886 (aged 68); Saarbrücken
- Occupation: Humanitarian
- Known for: Awarded the Cross of Merit for women and virgins

Katharine Weissgerber (3 August 1818 – 6 August 1886), also known as Schultze Kathrin and the Good Samaritan of the Battle of Spichern, was a 19th-century German humanitarian. Katharine Weißgerber for her courage and their commitment during the Battle of Spichern on the Spicher Heights (6 August 1870) was awarded in Saarbrücken the Cross of Merit for women and virgins.

== Early life ==
The daughter of the linen weaver and miner Peter Weißgerber and Maria Katharina Lauer. She was born on 3 August 1818 as the fifth child in Schwarzenholz, Maienstrasse (now Schulze-Kathrin-Straße Street).

She received the name Schultze Kathrin from her job as a home help and nanny with the Schultz family in Saarbrücken. Her employer Carl Jacob Schultz operated a manufactory goods shop in Saarbrücken in today's street "Am Schlossberg" opposite the long side of the Saarbrücken Castle Church. Schultz had been in the Lützow Freikorps in the liberation wars, then served as a sergeant in the 9th Hussar regiment in Saarbrücken. After the war he married the pewter daughter Magdalena Catharina Korn in 1825 in Saarbrücken. Today there is a parking lot on the grounds of the residential and commercial building of the family Schultz.

== Battle of Spichern ==
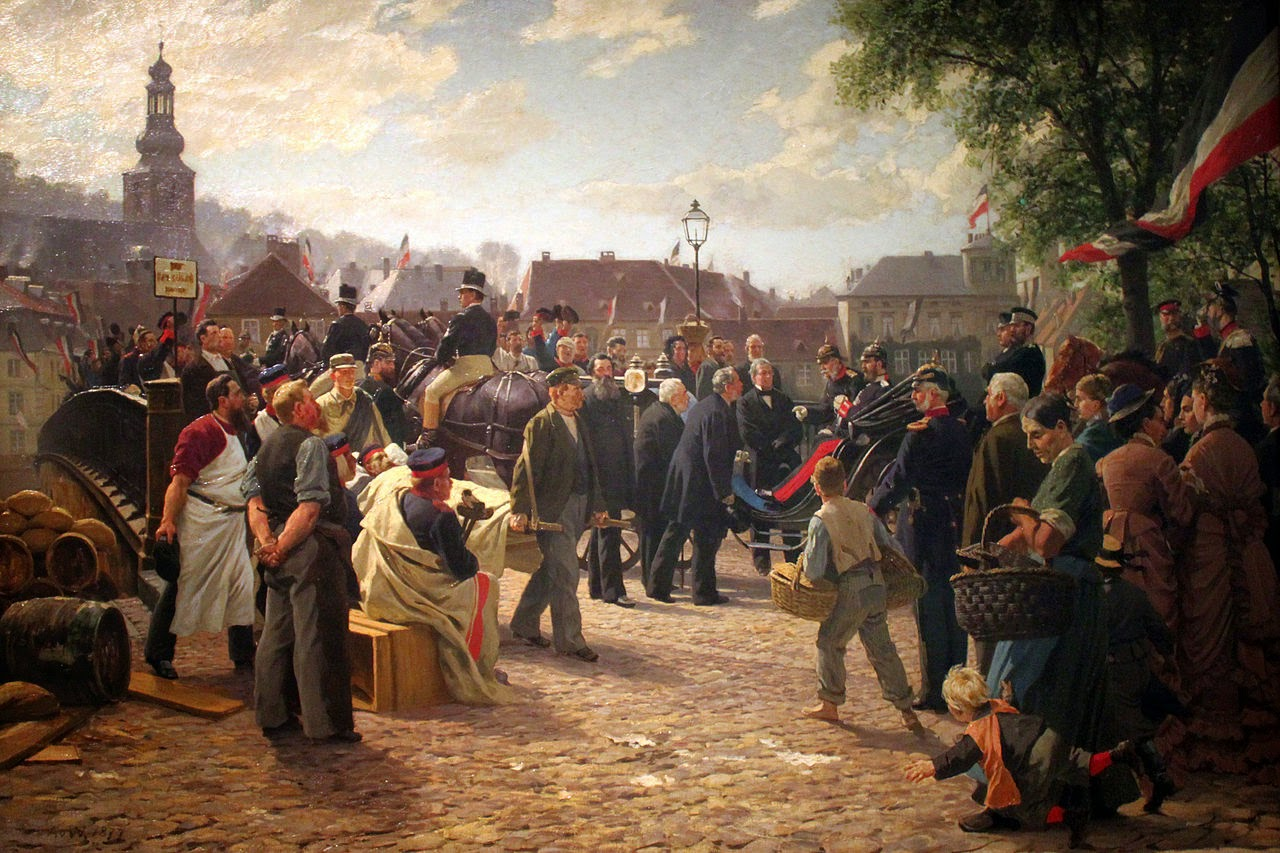
Farbskizze zu „The arrival of King Wilhelms I. in Saarbrücken on 9. August 1870“ (Deutsches Historisches Museum)

France declared war on Prussia on 19 July 1870, French troops crossed the border near Saarbrücken the same day and bombarded the city on 28 July. On 2 August, the French troops invaded the city of Schwarenholz. Katharine Weißgerber brought an injured person to safety and sought a priest for the dying in a hail of bullets.

Prussian troops arrived and began the counter-offensive on 6 August. In the middle of the fray, Katharine Weißgerber took care of the wounded soldiers of both nations. Her work was reported to the Prussian King Wilhelm, who awarded her the Cross of Merit for women and virgins (i.e. unmarried women).

== Death ==
Despite the honorable recognition Weisgerber died poor and sick and almost forgotten in Saarbrücken. After her death a call for donations allowed the setting of a proper burial, now part of the German-French Garden in Saarbrücken. Her tombstone bears the inscription:Dem heldenmütigen Mädchen zum ehrenden Gedächtnis gewidmet von ihren Mitbürgern

== Memorials ==
- In Saarbrücken a school is named after her, the "Katharine-Weißgerber-Schule
- In addition, a street in the state capital is named after her.
- In Saarwellingen district a street named after her.

There is a plaque on her birthplace, which had to be demolished because of dilapidation in the meantime. In front of the fire station in Bartholomäusstraße is a small monument with her portrait. The pharmacy across the street from the monument and the multi-purpose hall in the town bear their name.

- The Seniorenstift in the district of Saarwellingen received the name Schulze-Kathrin-Hof at the suggestion of the then Saarwellingen mayor Werner Geibel. It is noteworthy that in Saarwellingen the spelling of her name is handled slightly modified, without the t in Schultze. Initiatives to correct this, have been rejected by the mayor.
