= Wolfsindis of Reisbach =

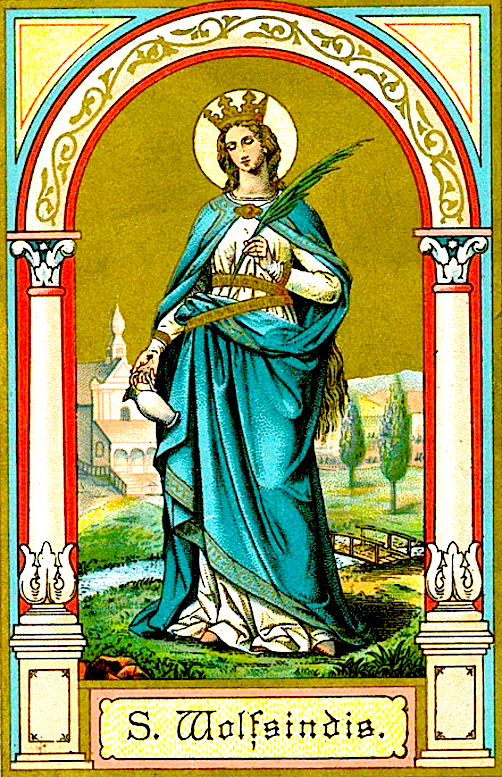
Saint Wolfsindis of Reisbach, ca. 1900.

Wolfsindis of Reisbach is a regional saint of the Middle Ages in Lower Bavaria, who is revered as holy virgin and martyr. Her veneration dates back to the 7th or 8th century.

According to legend, Wolfsindis became a Christian in secret and was slain by her heathen father, whereupon a spring rose up at that spot. A different tradition recounts that, as a Christian virgin, she was bound to the tail of a horse by a rejected suitor and dragged to death.

The saint and her grave were revered at least since the 8th century, when the Bavarian duke Tassilo III (748–788) gave Reisbach to Wessobrunn Abbey in 760. At this place a church synod took place in 798/799. Wolfsindis is further mentioned in a Wessobrunnian necrology from the 10th century, an indenture of Regensburg's bishop Heinrich I (1132–1155) from 1139 and a necrology of the Abbey of Saint Gall from the 12th century. Since 1753 the holy day of Wolfsindis is celebrated in Reisbach and neighbouring Dirnaich. September 2 ihas been observed as Wolfsindis' death and feast day since old times. There are no doubts about her historicity, but there are questions about her martyrdom. The cult of the saint is connected to a spring cult: In the 18th and 19th century many healings were attributed to the water that nowadays flows from below the altar of the small church erected in 1822.
