= Schacht =

Schacht is a German surname, derived from the common noun meaning "mine shaft".

== Surname ==
- Emil Schacht (1854–1915), American architect
- Hermann Schacht (1814–1864), German botanist and pharmacist
- Hjalmar Schacht (1877–1970), German financial expert in the Weimar Republic and Nazi Germany
- Joseph Schacht (1902–1969), German Catholic scholar of Islamic law
- Henry Schacht (born 1933/1934), American businessman
- Richard Schacht (born 1941), American philosopher
- Chris Schacht (born 1946), Australian politician

== Other uses ==
- Schacht (automobile), an American manufacturer of automobile, trucks and fire trucks from 1904 to 1940
- Schacht-Audorf, in Schleswig-Holstein, Germany
- Schacht v. United States, a United States Supreme Court case (1970)
