= Reisbach (Saar) =

- Town
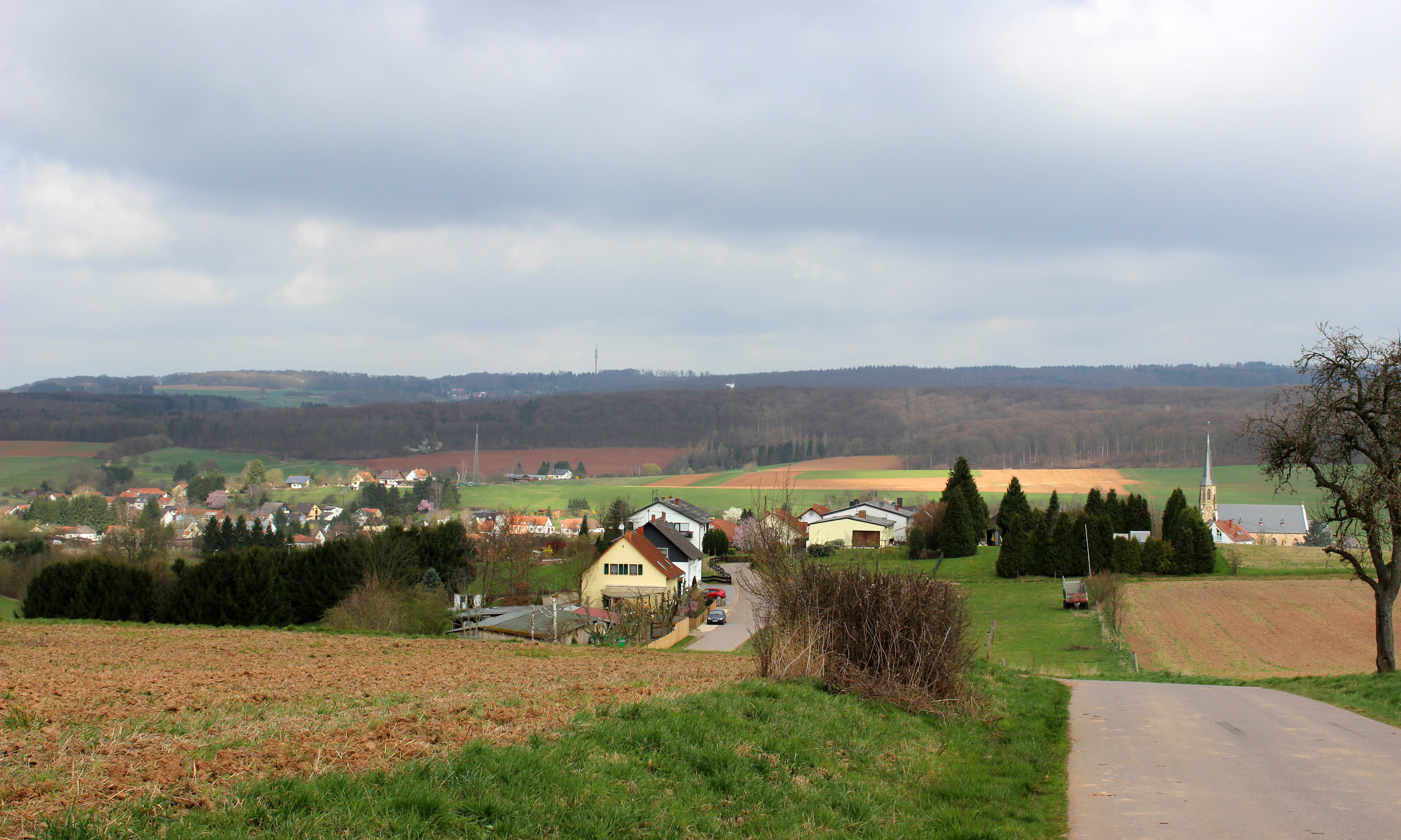
- View over Reisbach in the Northwestern direction

- Coat of arms

- Location within Germany
- Coordinates: 49°21′41″N 06°52′47″E
- Country: Germany
- State: Saarland
- District: Saarlouis
- Municipality: Saarwellingen

Area
  - Total: 13.40 km^{2} (5.17 sq mi)
- Elevation: 231 m (758 ft)

Population (2025-11-14)
  - Total: 2,436
  - Density: 181.8/km^{2} (470.8/sq mi)
- Postal code: 66793
- Dialling code: 06838

Reisbach is a small town, belonging to the district of Saarlouis in the Bundesland Saarland.

== History ==
The village was formed on April 1, 1937, when the two townships of Reisweiler and Labach were joined together as "Reisbach". Reisweiler was first mentioned as "Reisweiler" in 1154. The Germanic name "Radi" means "father of the town council", which, together with the "-ville" suffix meaning "farmland", yields the meaning of "Reisweiler" as "Radi's Farmland". The first written documentation about Labach dates from the 13th century, when it was known under the name "Loupach" or "Loupbach". The name is composed from "Loup" meaning "foliage" (German "Laub") and "Bach" meaning "creek". Since January 1, 1974, Reisbach has formed the municipality of Saarwellingen, together with Saarwellingen proper and Schwarzenholz with a combined 14,000 inhabitants.

Its population was 2,552 in 1961 and 2,662 in 1970.

== Coat of arms ==
The coat of arms represents the rulerships over the two villages: The base is the coat of arms of the Lords of Saarbrücken (Lisdorf), the diagonal bar, while the red and gold colors stem from the coat of arms of the Lords of Zweibrücken. The two fields formed by the diagonal bar stand for the two villages which form Reisbach: the upper field for Labach, with the crossed circle of Fraulautern Abbey; the lower field for Reisweiler, with the cross of the Lords of Bolchen. Reisbach was given the right to bear a coat of arms on September 27, 1964 by the Minister of the Interior Ludwig Schnur.
