= Gregor Zallwein =

Priest and expert on canon law (1712–1766)

Personal life
- Born: October 20, 1712 Oberviechtach, Oberpfalz, Holy Roman Empire
- Died: August 6, 1766 Salzburg, Prince-Archbishopric of Salzburg
- Known for: Expert on canon law
- Occupation: Benedictine monk, canon law professor

Religious life
- Religion: Roman Catholic
- Order: Benedictine

Gregor Zallwein (20 October 1712, Oberviechtach, Oberpfalz - 6 or 9 August 1766, Salzburg) was an Austrian expert on canon law.

== Early life ==
He studied Humanities in Ratisbon and Freising. He took vows at the Benedictine Abbey of Wessobrunn, on 15 November 1733, and was ordained priest on 27 October 1731. He studied canon law at Salzburg from 1737 to 1739.

== Career ==
He became master of novices at his monastery in 1739, and became prior in 1744. Upon the request of the Prince-bishop of Gurk, Joseph Maria Count of Thun, he was sent as professor of canon law to the newly erected seminary at Salzburg in Carinthia. From 1749 until his death he was professor of canon law at the Benedictine University of Salzburg, where he held at the same time the office of "Rector magnificus" from 1759.

== Perspective and publications ==
Unlike most German canonists of his time, he laid great stress on the sources and historical development of canon law. Though his juristic writings are at times not clear, his lectures were highly valued and attended by students from foreign countries. His chief work is Principia juris eccles. universalis et particularis Germaniae (4 vols., Augsburg, 1763; 2nd ed. by Kleimayern, Augsburg, 1781; 3rd ed., Augsburg, 1831). His other canonical works are: Disputatio prima de jure canonico... (Salzburg, 1753); Fontes originarii juris canonici, adjuncta historia ulare Germaniae (Salzburg, 1757); Dissertatio de statu ecclesiae, de hierarchia... (Salzburg, 1757).

== Literature ==
- Wolfgang Winhard (1998). "Zallwein, Gregor". In Bautz, Traugott (ed.). Biographisch-Bibliographisches Kirchenlexikon (BBKL) (in German). Vol. 14. Herzberg: Bautz. cols. 336–339. ISBN 3-88309-073-5.
