= Vincenzo Miotti =

Italian physicist and astronomer

Vincenzo Miotti (25 July 1712, Murano – 15 February 1787, Murano) was an Italian physicist and astronomer.

== Life ==
Born in the parish of Santo Stefano on Murano to Daniele Miotti and Angela Licini, he was the first of three brothers and two sisters. He came from a wealthy family of glaziers which owned a furnace, but he left the family business in the hands of his brother Alvise, preferring a career in the church.

After studying in the patriarchal seminary in Venice at San Cipriano, run by the Somaschi Fathers, he distinguished himself in classics, mathematics, physics and astronomy. He joined the Camaldolese cultural circle at San Michele in Isola, where he met Angelo Calogerà and Fortunato Mandelli.

He became a priest at Santa Maria e San Donato and led a cloistered life, declining the many academic posts offered to him and devoting himself to designing and building instruments for physics and astronomy demonstrations, which were used and highly valued by Jérôme Lalande, Paolo Frisi, Ruggiero Giuseppe Boscovich and Alessandro Volta. Mainly made of card and wood, few of them now survive, though one for demonstrating the tautochrone curve of a cycloid and another for parabolic motion do remain. Many small fragments and gadgets also survive in the Murano Glass Museum.
