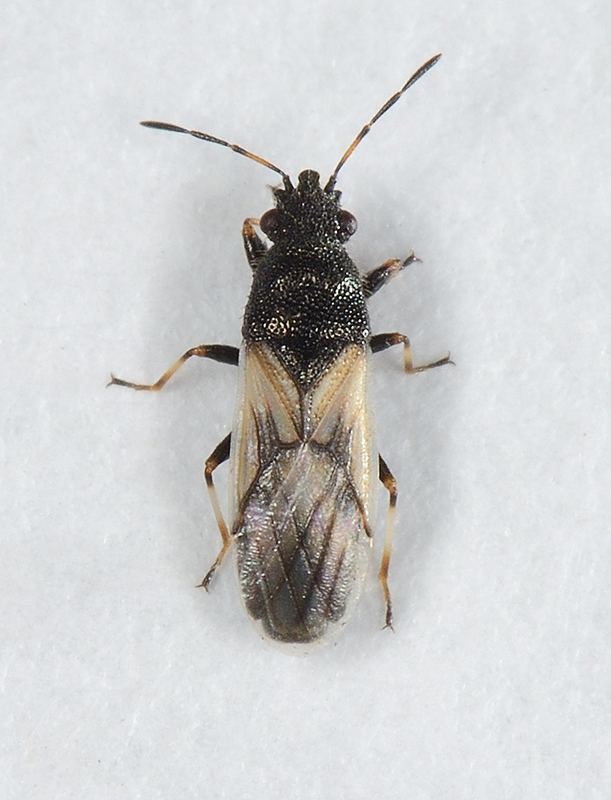

Scientific classification
- Kingdom: Animalia
- Phylum: Arthropoda
- Class: Insecta
- Order: Hemiptera
- Suborder: Heteroptera
- Family: Oxycarenidae
- Genus: Metopoplax
- Species: M. ditomoides

Binomial name
- Metopoplax ditomoides (A. Costa, 1847)

= Metopoplax ditomoides =

Species of true bug

Metopoplax ditomoides is a species of true bug in the family Oxycarenidae. Large numbers have been known to invade buildings near riparian areas during migrations from marshes.< "Pests of Landscape Trees and Shrubs." 2016. S.H. Dreistadt, J. C. Clark, T. A. Martin, M. L. Flint. University of California Statewide Integrated Pest Management Program. Oakland: UC ANR Publication 3359, 143.>

== Description ==
There is a dark forebody on this small ground bug, while its forewings are rather contrasting with the dark forebody. Its head, pronotum, and scutellum are densely punctured and covered with short white hairs.
