= Crophius disconotus =

Scientific classification
- Domain: Eukaryota
- Kingdom: Animalia
- Phylum: Arthropoda
- Class: Insecta
- Order: Hemiptera
- Suborder: Heteroptera
- Family: Oxycarenidae
- Genus: Crophius
- Species: C. disconotus

Binomial name
- Crophius disconotus (Say, 1832)

Synonyms
- Lygaeus disconotus Say, 1832

Species of true bug

Crophius disconotus is a species of true bug in the family Oxycarenidae. It is found in Central America and North America.
