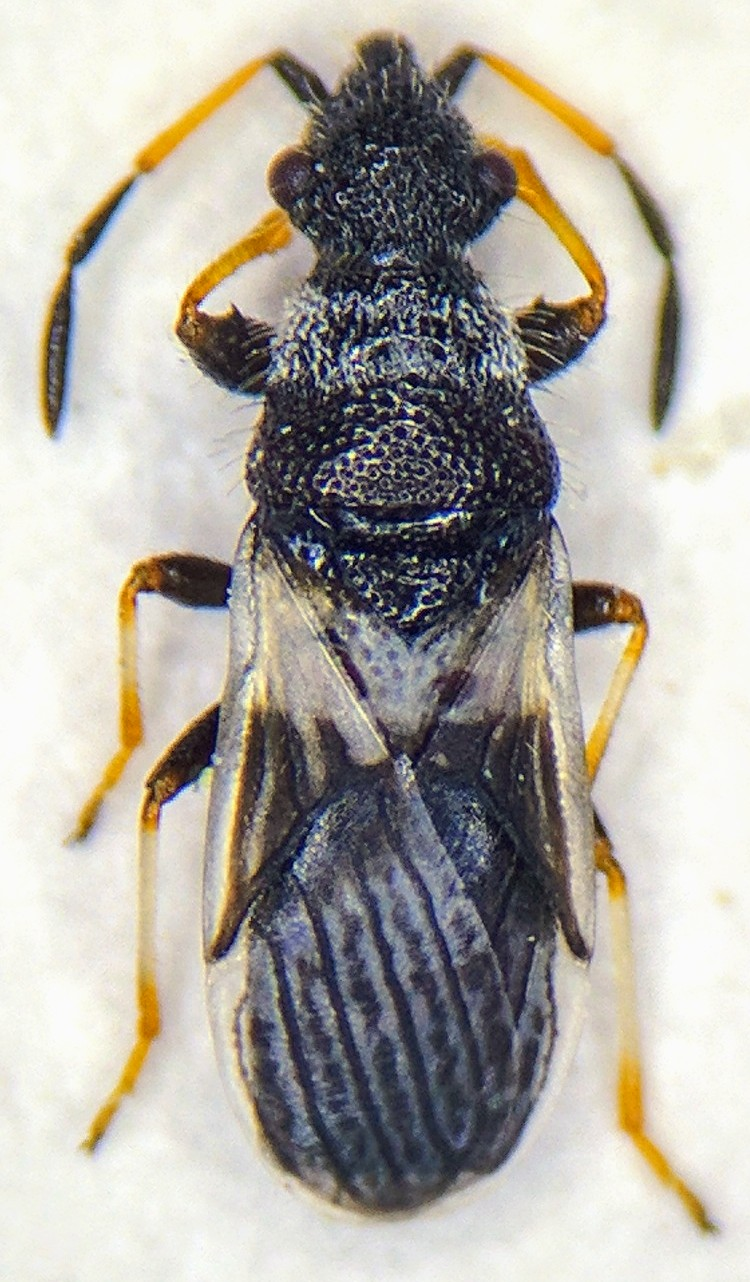

Scientific classification
- Domain: Eukaryota
- Kingdom: Animalia
- Phylum: Arthropoda
- Class: Insecta
- Order: Hemiptera
- Suborder: Heteroptera
- Infraorder: Pentatomomorpha
- Superfamily: Lygaeoidea
- Family: Oxycarenidae
- Genus: Microplax
- Species: M. albofasciata

Binomial name
- Microplax albofasciata (A. Costa 1847)

= Microplax albofasciata =

Species of true bug

Microplax albofasciata is an insect--a species of True bug in the genus Microplax, a member of family Oxycarenidae. It is native from the Mediterranean north to the Channel Islands and Germany. It was first documented in the United States (in California) in 2012.
