= Crophius schwarzi =

Scientific classification
- Domain: Eukaryota
- Kingdom: Animalia
- Phylum: Arthropoda
- Class: Insecta
- Order: Hemiptera
- Suborder: Heteroptera
- Family: Oxycarenidae
- Genus: Crophius
- Species: C. schwarzi

Binomial name
- Crophius schwarzi Van Duzee, 1910

Species of true bug

Crophius schwarzi is a species of true bug in the family Oxycarenidae. It is found in North America.
