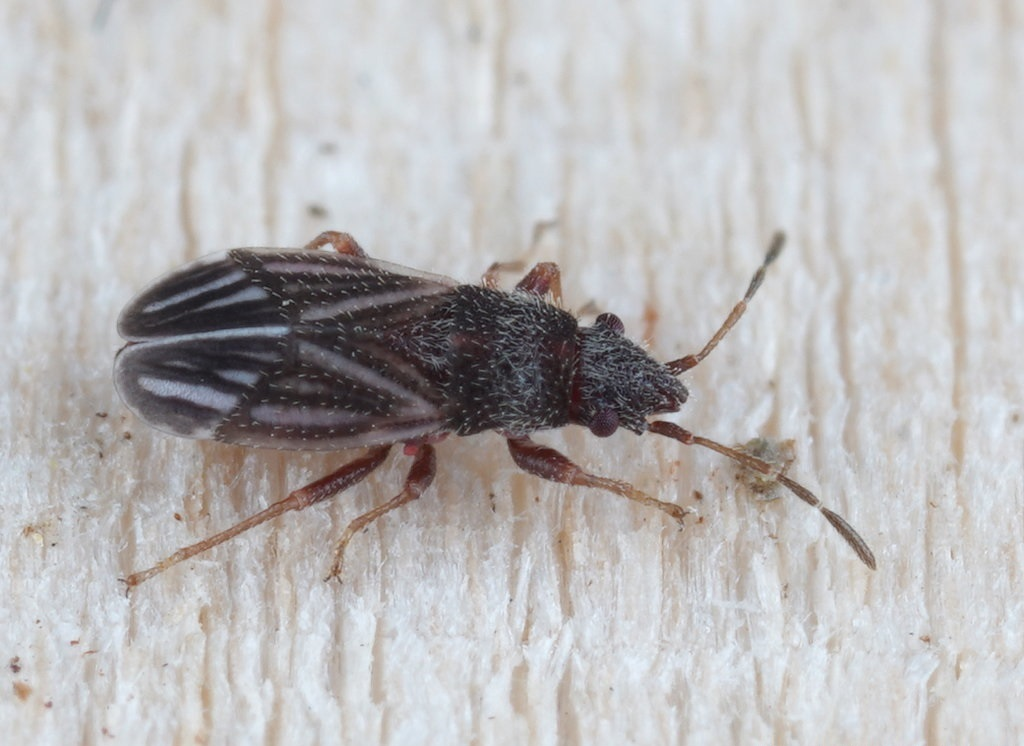
- Tropidophlebia costalis

Scientific classification
- Domain: Eukaryota
- Kingdom: Animalia
- Phylum: Arthropoda
- Class: Insecta
- Order: Hemiptera
- Suborder: Heteroptera
- Family: Oxycarenidae
- Genus: Tropidophlebia; Kerzhner, 1964

= Tropidophlebia =

Genus of true bugs

Tropidophlebia is a genus of true bugs belonging to the family Oxycarenidae.

The species of this genus are found in Europe.

Species:

- Tropidophlebia costalis (Herrich-Schaeffer, 1850)
- Tropidophlebia subcarinata Muminov, 1973
