= Macroplax =

Scientific classification
- Domain: Eukaryota
- Kingdom: Animalia
- Phylum: Arthropoda
- Class: Insecta
- Order: Hemiptera
- Suborder: Heteroptera
- Family: Oxycarenidae
- Genus: Macroplax; Fieber, 1860

Genus of true bugs

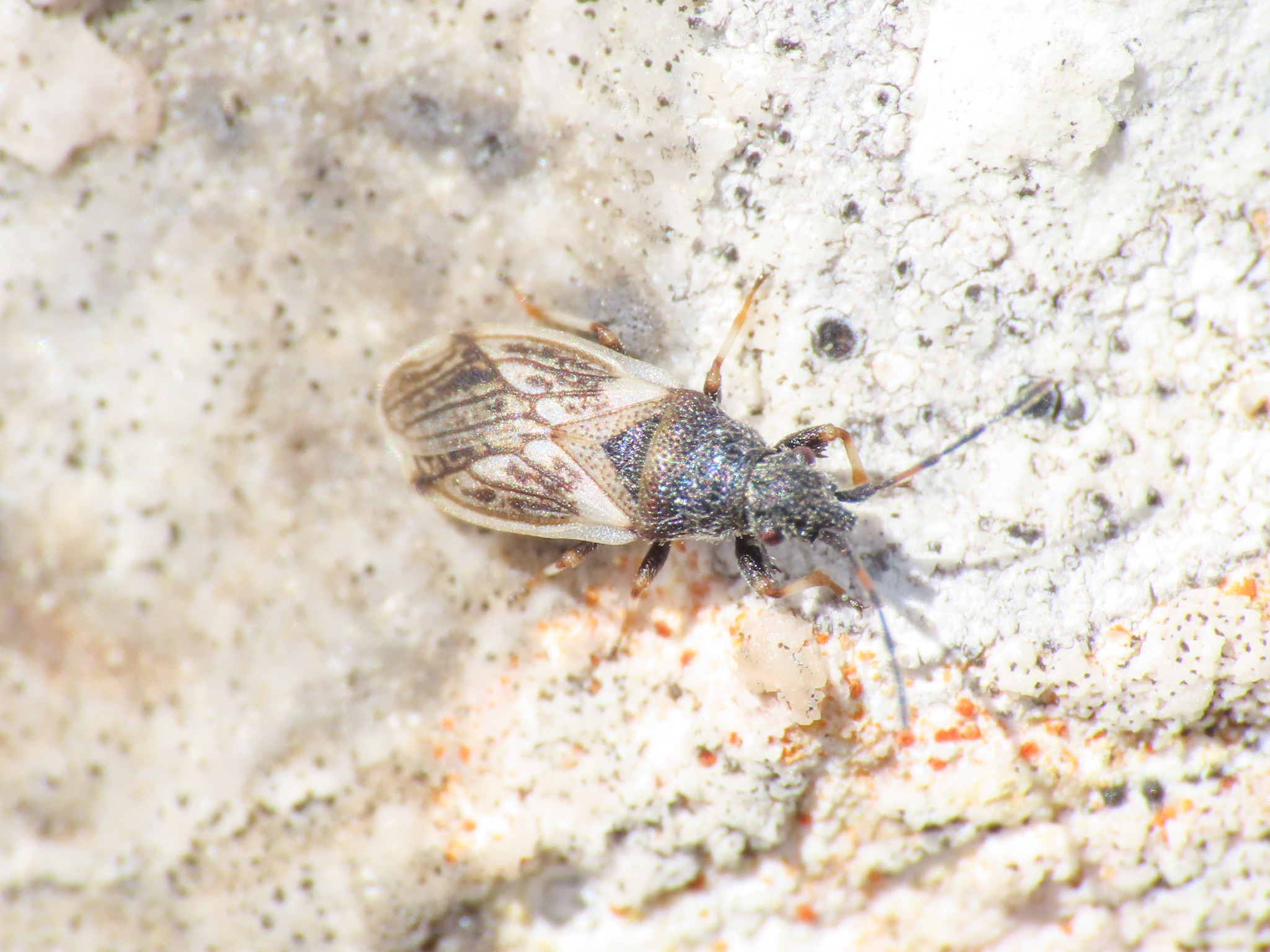
Macroplax preyssleri (Heteroptera, Oxycarenidae)

Macroplax is a genus of true bugs belonging to the family Oxycarenidae.

The species of this genus are found in Europe.

Species:

- Macroplax blancae Hoberlandt, 1943
- Macroplax capensis Slater, 1972
