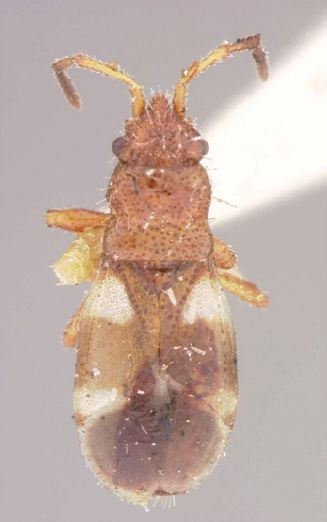
- Dycoderus picturatus

Scientific classification
- Domain: Eukaryota
- Kingdom: Animalia
- Phylum: Arthropoda
- Class: Insecta
- Order: Hemiptera
- Suborder: Heteroptera
- Family: Oxycarenidae
- Genus: Dycoderus; Uhler, 1901
- Species: D. picturatus

Binomial name
- Dycoderus picturatus Uhler, 1901

= Dycoderus =

Genus of true bugs

Dycoderus is a genus of Nearctic true bugs in the family Oxycarenidae. There is one described species in Dycoderus, D. picturatus.

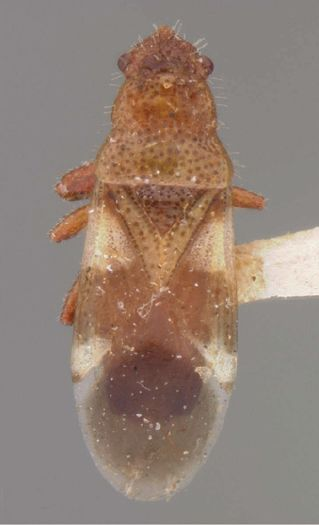
Dycoderus picturatus
