= Camptotelus =

Scientific classification
- Kingdom: Animalia
- Phylum: Arthropoda
- Clade: Pancrustacea
- Class: Insecta
- Order: Hemiptera
- Suborder: Heteroptera
- Family: Oxycarenidae
- Genus: Camptotelus; Fieber, 1860

Genus of true bugs

Camptotelus is a genus of true bugs belonging to the family Oxycarenidae.

The genus was first described by Fieber in 1860.

The species of this genus are found in Europe.

Species:

- Camptotelus lineolatus (Schilling, 1829)
