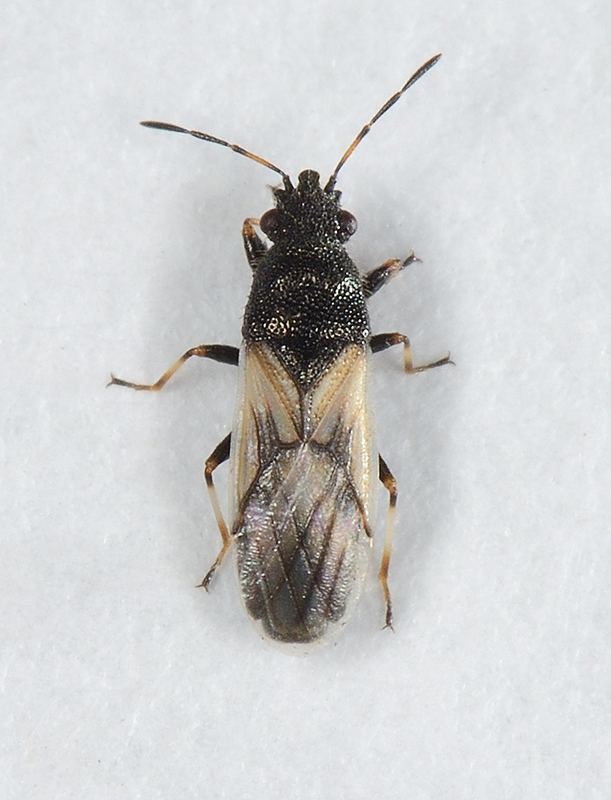
- Metopoplax ditomoides

Scientific classification
- Kingdom: Animalia
- Phylum: Arthropoda
- Class: Insecta
- Order: Hemiptera
- Suborder: Heteroptera
- Family: Oxycarenidae
- Genus: Metopoplax; Fieber, 1860

= Metopoplax =

Genus of true bugs

Metopoplax is a genus of true bugs in the family Oxycarenidae. There are at least three described species in Metopoplax.

== Species ==
These three species belong to the genus Metopoplax:

- Metopoplax ditomoides (A. Costa, 1847)^{c g b}
- Metopoplax fuscinervis Stal, C., 1872^{c g}
- Metopoplax origani (Kolenati, F.A., 1845)^{c g}

Data sources: i = ITIS, c = Catalogue of Life, g = GBIF, b = Bugguide.net
