= Crophius =

Scientific classification
- Domain: Eukaryota
- Kingdom: Animalia
- Phylum: Arthropoda
- Class: Insecta
- Order: Hemiptera
- Suborder: Heteroptera
- Family: Oxycarenidae
- Genus: Crophius; Stal, 1874

Synonyms
- Mayana Distant, 1893

Genus of true bugs

Crophius is a genus of true bugs in the family Oxycarenidae. There are about 16 described species in Crophius.

== Species ==
These 16 species belong to the genus Crophius:

- Crophius albidus Barber, 1938
- Crophius angustatus Van Duzee, 1910
- Crophius bermani Vinokurov, 1975
- Crophius bohemani (Stal, 1859)
- Crophius coleopteroides Kormilev, 1950
- Crophius convexus Barber, 1938
- Crophius disconotus (Say, 1831)
- Crophius fasciatus (Fieber, 1837)
- Crophius impressus Van Duzee, 1910
- Crophius leucocnemis (Berg, 1879)
- Crophius meridana (Brailovsky, 2014)
- Crophius patagonica (Dellapé & Cheli, 2007)
- Crophius scabrosus (Uhler, 1904)
- Crophius schwarzi Van Duzee, 1910
- Crophius sitesi (Brailovsky, 2014)
- Crophius tumidus Scudder, 2016
