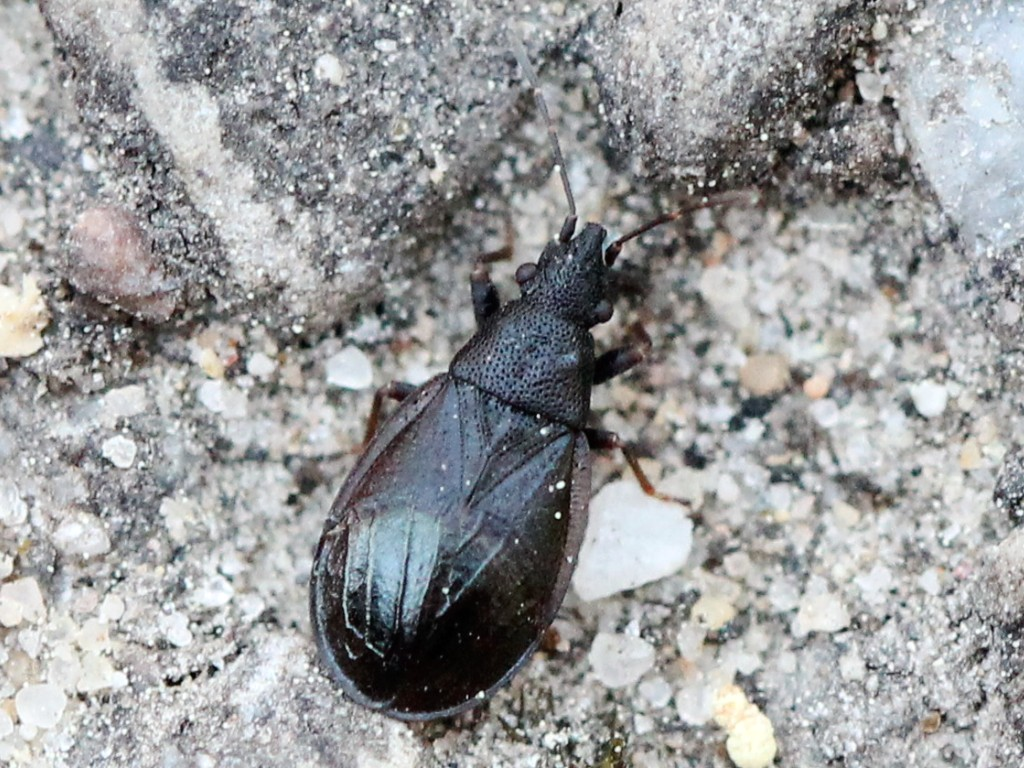
- Philomyrmex insignis

Scientific classification
- Kingdom: Animalia
- Phylum: Arthropoda
- Class: Insecta
- Order: Hemiptera
- Suborder: Heteroptera
- Family: Oxycarenidae
- Genus: Philomyrmex; Sahlberg, 1848

= Philomyrmex =

Genus of true bugs

Philomyrmex is a genus of true bugs belonging to the family Oxycarenidae.

The species of this genus are found in Northern Europe.

Species:

- Philomyrmex insignis Sahlberg, 1848
