= Mayana (bug) =

Scientific classification
- Domain: Eukaryota
- Kingdom: Animalia
- Phylum: Arthropoda
- Class: Insecta
- Order: Hemiptera
- Suborder: Heteroptera
- Family: Oxycarenidae
- Genus: Mayana; Distant, 1882

Genus of true bugs

Mayana is a genus of true bugs in the family Oxycarenidae. There are at least three described species in Mayana.

== Species ==
These three species belong to the genus Mayana:

- Mayana costatus Distant, W.L., 1893^{c g}
- Mayana diruptus Distant, W.L., 1882^{c g}
- Mayana ramosus Barber, H.G., 1938^{c g}

Data sources: i = ITIS, c = Catalogue of Life, g = GBIF, b = Bugguide.net
