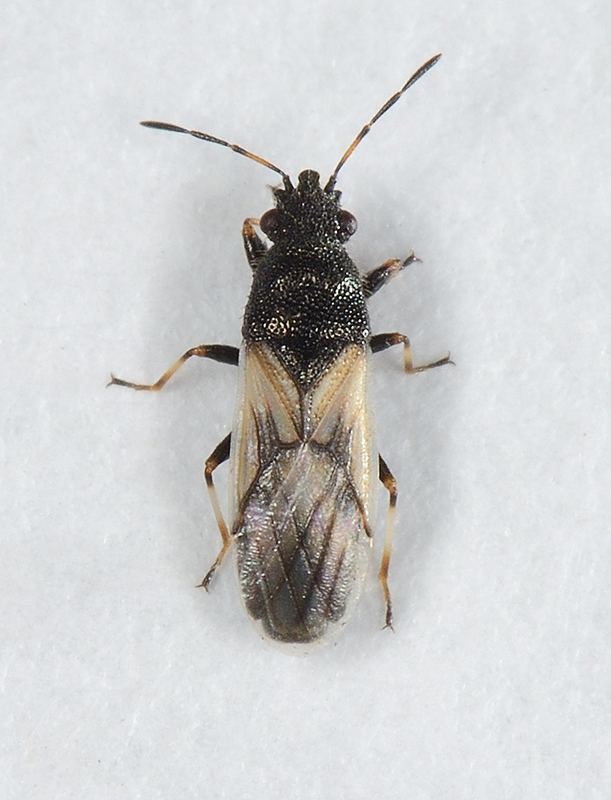
- Metopoplax ditomoides

Scientific classification
- Kingdom: Animalia
- Phylum: Arthropoda
- Class: Insecta
- Order: Hemiptera
- Suborder: Heteroptera
- Infraorder: Pentatomomorpha
- Superfamily: Lygaeoidea
- Family: Oxycarenidae; Stål, 1862

= Oxycarenidae =

Family of true bugs

Oxycarenidae is a family of true bugs in the order Hemiptera with a world-wide distribution. There are more than 140 described species in Oxycarenidae.

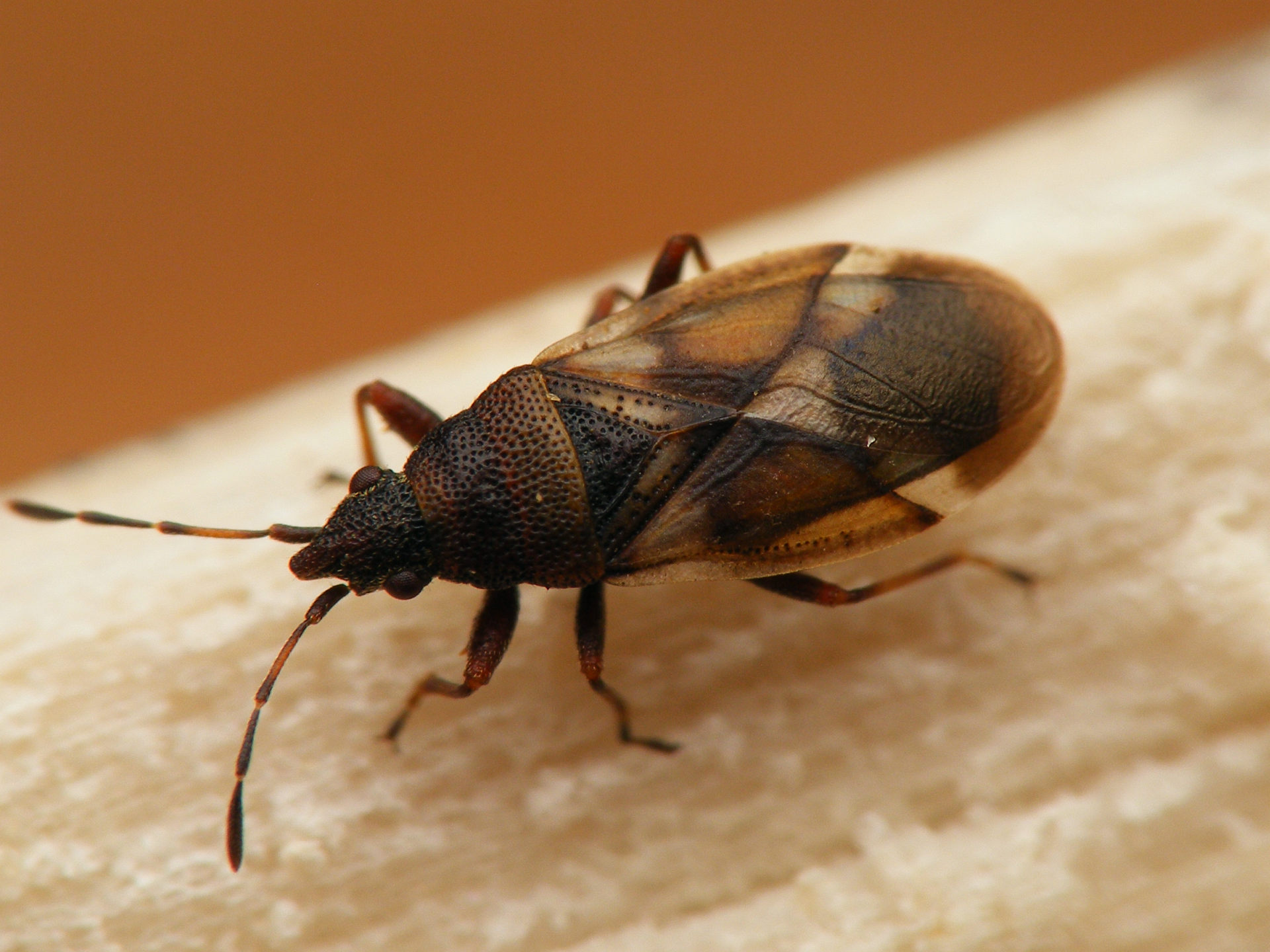
Oxycarenus modestus

== Genera ==
These following genera (26 in 2025) belong to the family Oxycarenidae:

- Anomaloptera Amyot & Serville, 1843
- Auchenodes Horvath, 1891
- Barberocoris Miller, 1956
- Bethylimorphus Lindberg, 1953
- Bianchiella Reuter, 1907
- Bogdiana Kerzhner, 1964
- Brachyplax Fieber, 1860
- Bycanistellus Reuter, 1890
- Camptotelus Fieber, 1860
- Crophius Stal, 1874
- Dycoderus Uhler, 1901
- Jakowleffia Puton, 1875
- Leptodemus Reuter, 1900
- Macroplax Fieber, 1860
- Macropternella Slater, 1957
- Mayana Distant, 1893
- Metopoplax Fieber, 1860
- Microplax Fieber, 1860
- Neaplax Slater, 1974
- Neocamptotelus Hoberlandt, 1987
- Neocrophius Henry & Dellapé, 2015
- Notocoderus Henry & Dellapé, 2009
- Oxycarenus Fieber, 1837
- Philomyrmex Sahlberg, 1848
- Tropidophlebia Kerzhner, 1964
- Urvaschia Hopp, 1987
- † Procrophius Scudder, 1890
