= Lilly (given name) =

Lilly is a feminine given name which is borne by:

== People ==
=== Female ===
- Lilly Adong (born 1976), Ugandan politician
- Lilly Ajarova (born 1969), Ugandan conservationist and tourism expert
- Lilly Among Clouds (born 1990), German singer-songwriter
- Lilly Appelbaum Malnik (born 1928), Belgian-American Holocaust survivor
- Lilly Aspell (born 2007), British actress and equestrian show jumper
- Lilly Bartlam (born 2006), Canadian actress
- Lilly Becher (1901–1978), German writer, journalist, and communist activist
- Lilly Be'Soer, Papua New Guinean women's rights activist
- Lilly Bølviken (1914–2011), Norwegian judge and women's rights advocate
- Lilly Brændgaard (1918–2009), Danish fashion designer and businesswoman
- Lilly Burns, American television producer
- Lilly Daché (c. 1892–1989), French-born American milliner and fashion designer
- Lilly de Castella, 19th-century Australian colonist and winemaker
- Lilly de Jongh Osborne (1883–1975), Costa Rican writer, lecturer, collector, and scholar
- Lilly Dubowitz (1930–2016), Hungarian-born British paediatrician
- Lilly Engström (1843–1921), Swedish pedagogue and women's rights activist
- Lilly Fenichel (1927–2016), American painter
- Lilly Flohr (1893–1978), Austrian stage- and film actress and singer
- Lilly Frazer (1854/1855–1941), French-born British writer and translator
- Lilly Ghalichi, American entrepreneur and blogger; contestant on Shahs of Sunset
- Lilly Goodman (born 1980), Dominican singer and songwriter
- Lilly Goren, American political scientist, historian, and professor
- Lilly Hafgren (1884–1965), Swedish operatic soprano
- Lilly Hartley, American documentary film producer and actress
- Lilly Heber (1879–1944), Norwegian literary critic and historian, novelist, and magazine editor
- Lilly Hellström (1866–1930), Swedish schoolteacher, children's newspaper editor, and suffragist
- Lilly Hiatt (born 1984), American singer-songwriter; daughter of singer-songwriter John Hiatt
- Lilly Higgins, Irish judge on The Great Irish Bake Off
- Lilly Hoffmann, maiden name of Sigrid Onégin (1889–1943), Franco-German operatic dramatic contralto
- Lilly Irani, Iranian-American academic, computer scientist, and associate professor of communication
- Lilly Jacobson (born 1988), American former baseball player
- Lilly Kaden (born 2001), German sprinter
- Lilly Kahil (1926–2002), Swiss-French archaeologist and classicist
- Lilly Kilvert (born 1950), American production designer
- Lilly King (born 1997), American swimmer
- Lilly Krug (born 2001), German film- and television actress and social media personality
- Lilly Lamprecht (1887–1976), Danish operatic soprano
- Lilly Ledbetter (1938–2024), American activist
- Lilly Lippeatt (born 2004), American artistic gymnast
- Lilly Loca, New Zealand contestant on House of Drag
- Lilly Marcou (born 1936), French historian
- Lilly Marks, American health administrator
- Lilly Martin Spencer (1822–1902), American painter
- Lilly Maxwell (c. 1800–1876), British suffragist
- Lilly McElroy (born 1980), American photographer
- Lilly Mills (born 2001), Australian cricketer
- Lilly Ogatina Valahoe Poznanski (1942–1989), Solomon Islander politician
- Lilly Otasevic (born 1969), Serbian Canadian artist
- Lilly Platt (born 2008), British-born Dutch environmentalist
- Lilly Pulitzer (1931–2013), American entrepreneur, fashion designer, and socialite
- Lilly Reale (born 2003), American soccer player
- Lilly Reich (1885–1947), German designer of textiles, furniture, interiors, and exhibition spaces
- Lilly Rivlin, Israeli journalist, writer, and filmmaker
- Lilly Rotärmel (born 2003), German former rhythmic gymnast
- Lilly Sanathanan, Indian statistician
- Lilly Scholz (1903–1994), Austrian pair skater
- Lilly Scott, American contestant on American Idol season 9
- Lilly Singh (born 1988), Canadian YouTuber, television host, comedian, and author
- Lilly Stein, Austrian convicted member of the Duquesne Spy Ring
- Lilly Steiner (1884–1961), Austrian painter and graphic artist
- Lilly Steinschneider (1891–1975), Hungarian aviator
- Lilly Stepanek (1912–2004), Austrian stage actress
- Lilly Stoephasius (born 2007), German skateboarder
- Lilly Stoffelsma (born 2002), German field hockey player
- Lilly Sullivan (disappeared 2025), Canadian missing girl
- Lilly Tartikoff (born 1953), American activist, socialite, restaurateur, and fundraiser for breast cancer
- Lilly Téllez (born 1967), Mexican politician and journalist
- Lilly Tempelsman, Belgian-American wife of businessman Maurice Tempelsman
- Lilly Van der Meer, Australian actress
- Lilly Wachowski (born 1967), American film- and television director, writer, and producer
- Lilly Wächter (1899–1989), German politician and official
- Lilly Walleni (1875–1920), Swedish mezzo-soprano
- Lilly Winwood, English daughter of musician Steve Winwood
- Lilly Wust (1913–2006), German housewife
- Lilly Yokoi (1929–2026), Japanese American bicycle acrobat
- Lilly Yue, American government statistician

=== Male ===
- Lilly Butler (?–1792), Irish Anglican priest
- Lilly Wigg (1749–1828), English botanist
- Lilly Williams, American former Negro league professional baseball player

== Fictional characters ==
- Lilly, in the role-playing video game Grandia
- Lilly, in the 2013 adventure video game Lilly Looking Through
- Lilly, in the 2003 US musical comedy film The Fighting Temptations, played by Beyoncé (Lilly) and Chloe Bailey (Young Lilly)
- Lilly (Ninjago), in the Danish-Canadian animated TV series Ninjago, voiced by Erin Mathews
- Lilly the Witch, the titular character of the series of the same name
- Lilly Bainbridge, in the US horror TV-series It: Welcome to Derry, played by Clara Stack
- Lilly Chambler, in the US post-apocalyptic horror drama TV series The Walking Dead, played by Audrey Marie Anderson
- Lilly Chillman, the Yellow Ranger in the US TV series Power Rangers Jungle Fury, played by Anna Hutchison
- Lilly Harper, in the US TV series I'll Fly Away, played by Regina Taylor
- Lilly Kane, in the US teen noir mystery drama TV series Veronica Mars, played by Amanda Seyfried
- Lilly Kane (The King of Fighters), in the arcade game series The King of Fighters
- Lilly Mattock, in the UK TV soap opera EastEnders, played by Barbara Keogh
- Lilly Moscovitz, in the young adult novel The Princess Diaries, played by Heather Matarazzo in the 2001 US coming-of-age comedy film
- Lilly Rush, in the US police procedural crime drama TV series Cold Case, played by Kathryn Morris, Christina Cellner, Makenna Barrett, Harley Graham, and Megan Helin
- Lilly Satou, in the visual novel Katawa Shoujo
- Lilly Sinclair, in the US TV sitcom Bosom Buddies, played by Lucille Benson
- Lilly Truscott, in the US teen sitcom Hannah Montana, played by Emily Osment
- Lilly Turner, the titular character of the 1933 US pre-Code melodrama film of the same name, played by Ruth Chatterton
- Lilly Wing, in the 1998 novel Seize the Night
- Lily, the sister of Maxwell in the Scribblenauts franchise

== See also ==
- Lily (name)
- Lillie (name)
- Lili (given name)
