= Lily (name) =

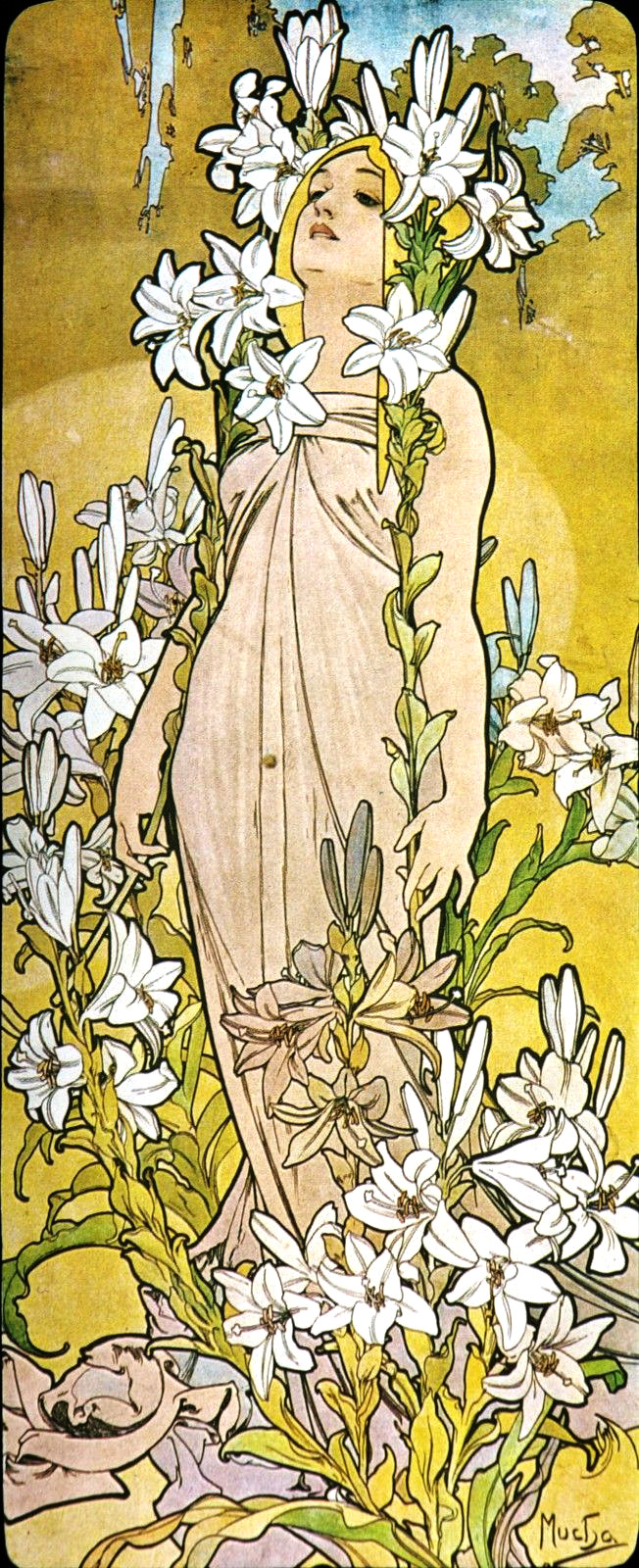
- Lily, an Art Nouveau illustration by Alfons Mucha, 1898.
- Pronunciation: English: /lɪliː/
- Gender: Female

Origin
- Meaning: lilium

Other names
- Alternative spelling: Lili, Lilli, Lillie, Lilly
- Related names: Lilia, Liliana, Liliane, Liliann, Lilibet, Lilibeth, Lilja, Lillian, Lilliana, Lilliane, Lillianne, Lillybeth, Lilyana, Lilyann, Lilyanna, Lilybeth, Lilymae, Lilyrose, Tigerlily

Lily is a feminine given name usually derived from lily, the flower. The name became particularly popular along with other flower names for girls during the 1800s and early 1900s. The lily also has associations with and has been symbolic of innocence and purity in Christian art. Names beginning with or containing the letter L have also been particularly fashionable for girls. It is also occasionally used as a diminutive for other names such as Elizabeth.

The popularity of the name increased steadily in most countries in western Europe and English-speaking countries during the late 20th and early 21st centuries.

The name is often used in combination with other names, sometimes spelled with a hyphen and sometimes without. Well-used combination names in use in countries such as Canada and the United States include those influenced by Lillian or Liliana or considered a combination of Lily and the names Anna, Ann, or Anne, such as Liliann, Lilianna, Lili-Ann, Lili-Anne, Lillianna, Lillianne, Lillyana, Lillyann, Lilly-Ann, Lillyanna, Lillyanne, Lilly-Anne, Lilyana, Lilyanna, Lily-Anne and Lily-Ann.

Other popular combination names in use include Lily-Rose, a combination of Lily and the name Rose, which is particularly well used in Quebec, Canada, where it was the 65th most popular name for newborn girls in 2022 and ranked among the top 300 names overall for girls in Canada in 2021, placing 297th on the popularity chart with 105 uses for Canadian girls that year, and its spelling variants Lili-Rose, which had nine uses in Canada in 2021, and Lilirose, Lilly-Rose, and Lilyrose. The name Lilyrose or Lily-Rose is also well used in England and Wales, where it has ranked among the top 1,000 names for girls since 2001 and among the top 500 names since 2006, and in France, where it has ranked among the top 500 names for French girls since 2004. It ranked among the top 200 names for newborn girls in Belgium in 2021. The name has also seen increased use in the United States, though it has not ranked among the top 1,000 names for American girls. Thirty-five American girls were given the name Lilyrose in 2022 and eleven American girls were called Lillyrose that year.

Other related or associated names include, among others, Lilia, Lilibet, Lilibeth, Lilika, Lilith, Lilja, Lilou, and Tigerlily.

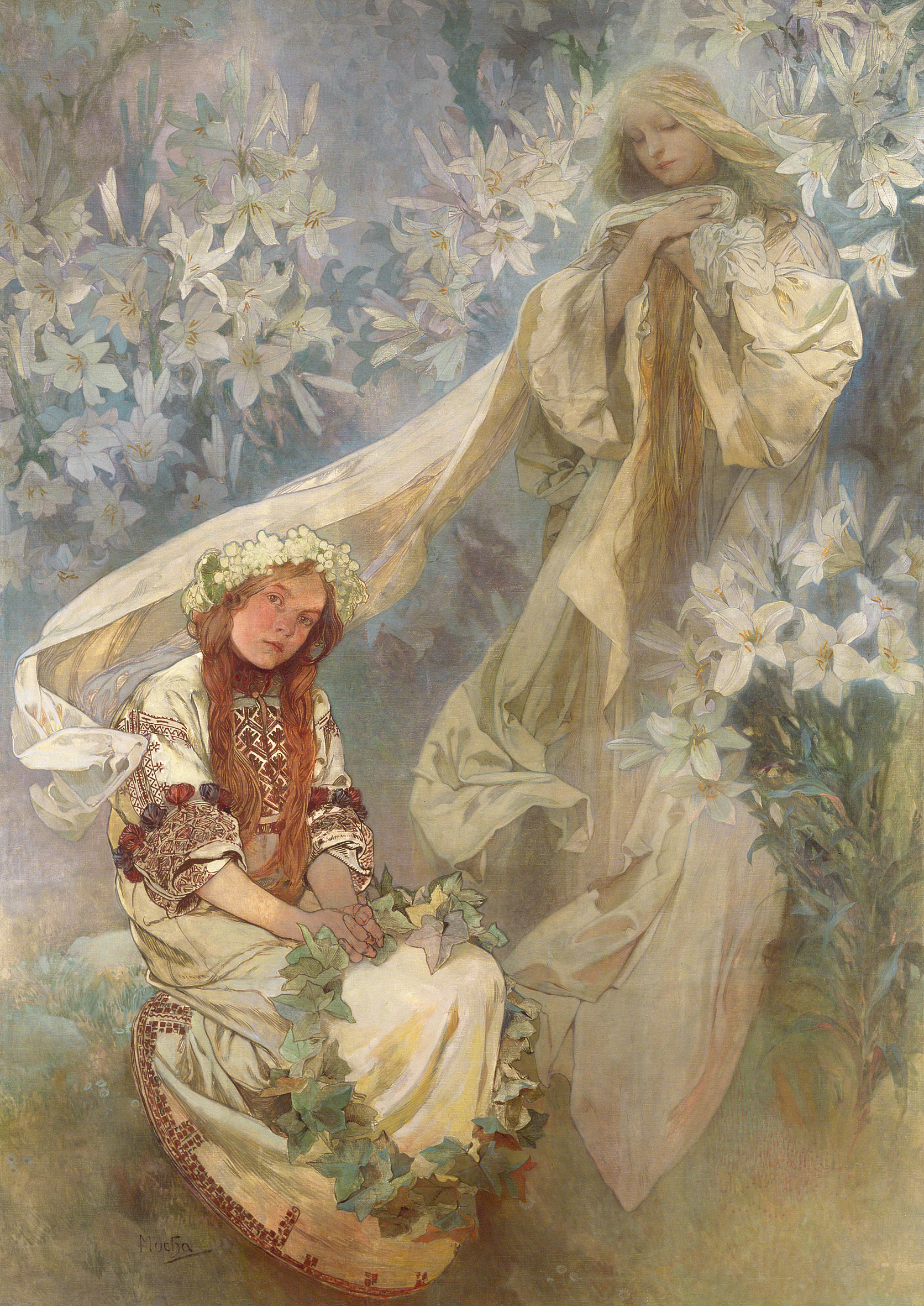
Madonna of the Lilies, 1905, by Alfons Mucha.

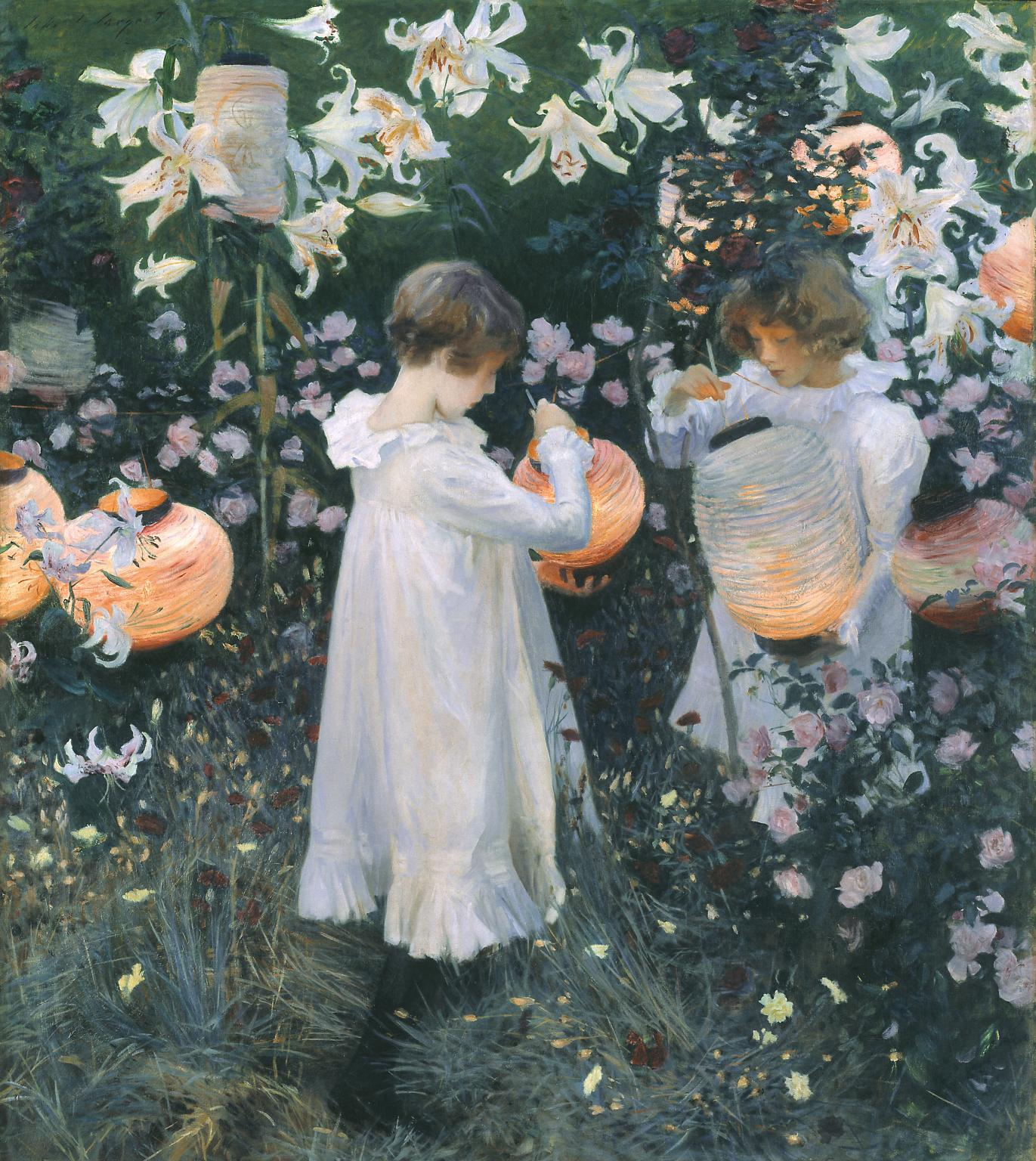
Carnation, Lily, Lily, Rose by John Singer Sargent, 1885.

== People ==
- Lily Abegg (1901–1974), Swiss journalist
- Lily Addison (1885–1982), Australian tennis player
- Lily Afshar (1960–2023) Iranian-American classical guitarist
- Lily Ah Toy (1917–2001), Australian pioneer and businesswoman
- Lily Aldridge (born 1985), American fashion model
- Lily Allen (born 1985), English singer, songwriter, actress and author
- Lily-Rose Aslandogdu (born 2003), English actress
- Lily Anderson (1922–1982), Irish social campaigner and communist
- Lily Atkinson (1866–1921), New Zealand temperance campaigner, suffragist, and feminist
- Lily Auchincloss (1922–1996), American journalist, philanthropist, and art collector
- Lily Beaurepaire (1892–1979), Australian swimmer and diver
- Lily Berglund (1928–2010), Swedish singer
- Lily Blatherwick (1854–1934), English painter
- Lily Bloom, French actress
- Lily Bouwmeester (1901–1993), Dutch theater and film actress
- Lily Braun (1865–1916), German feminist writer
- Lily Brayton (1876–1953), English actress
- Lily Brett (born 1946), Australian novelist
- Lily Brown (born 1981), American poet
- Lily Burana, American writer
- Lily Butters (1895–1980), Canadian philanthropist
- Lily Cahill (1888–1955), American actress
- Lily Carlstedt (1926–2005), Danish javelin thrower
- Lily Castel (born 1937), Belgian singer
- Lily Chakravarty (born 1941), Indian film actress
- Lily Chan (born 1983), Chinese singer
- Lily Chitty (1893–1979), British archaeologist and independent scholar
- Lily Chung (born 1964), Hong Kong based actress
- Lily Cole (born 1988), English fashion model
- Lily Collins (born 1989), English-American actress and model
- Lily D'Ambrosio (born 1964), Australian politician
- Lily Dampier (died 1915), Australian actor of stage and screen
- Lily Delianedis (born 2001), American ice hockey player
- Lily-Rose Depp (born 1999), French-American actress and model
- Lily Dick (born 1999), Australian women's national rugby sevens team player
- Lily Donaldson (born 1987), British fashion model
- Lily Dougall (1858–1923), Canadian author and feminist
- Lily E. Kay (1947–2000), Polish-American science historian
- Lily Eberwein (1900–1980), Sarawakian nationalist and women's right activist
- Lily Elise (born 1991), American singer-songwriter
- Lily Elsie (1886–1962), English actress and singer
- Lily Eskelsen García (born 1955), American teacher and trade union leader
- Lily Fabiola de la Rosa (born 1970), Mexican politician
- Lily Fayol (1914–1999), French singer
- Lily Franky (born 1963), Japanese illustrator, writer, and actor
- Lily Frost (contemporary), Canadian singer
- Lily Furedi (1896–1969), Hungarian-American artist
- Lily Garafulic (1914–2012), Chilean sculptor
- Lily Gladstone (born 1986), American actress
- Lily Goddard (1916–2002), Austrian author and designer
- Lily Gower (1877–1959), Welsh croquet player
- Lily Ann Granderson (1816–after 1870), American historical educator
- Lily Haass (1886–1964), American YWCA worker in Shanghai, China
- Lily Halpern (born 1991), American performer and singer
- Lily Hanbury (1873–1908), English stage performer
- Lily Hevesh, American YouTuber and domino artist
- Lily Hoshino, Japanese manga artist
- Lily Ho (actress) (born 1946), Chinese actress
- Lily Ho Ngo Yee (born 1988), Hong Kong actress
- Lily Hoy Price (born 1930), Canadian writer
- Lily Inglis (1926–2010), Canadian architect
- Lily Irene Jackson (1848–1928), American artist and arts organizer
- Lily Isabel Maude Addison (1885–1968), Australian architect
- Lily James (born 1989), English actress
- Lily Jan (born 1947), Professor of Molecular Physiology
- Lily Ki (born 1991), American internet personality
- Lily Kann (1893–1978), German-born British actress
- Lily Kelly Napangardi (born c.1948), Australian Aboriginal artist
- Lily Kempson (1897–1996), Irish trade union activist
- Lily King (born 1963), American novelist
- Lily Koppel (born 1981), American writer
- Lily Koros Tare, Kenyan medical administrator
- Lily Kronberger (1890–1974), Hungarian figure skater
- Lily Kwok (1918–2007), Chinese-born restaurateur
- Lily Laight (born 2001), British child actress
- Lily Laita (1969–2023), artist and art educator in New Zealand
- Lily Laskine (1893–1988), French harpist
- Lily Laverock (1880–1969) Scottish Canadian journalist, impresario and suffragist
- Lily Leung (1929–2019), actress in Hong Kong
- Lily Li (born 1950), Hong Kong actress
- Lily Lind (1882–1916), nurse from New Zealand who served in France in World War I
- Lily Lodge (1930–2021), American actress, acting coach, and etiquette consultant
- Lily Loveless (born 1990), English actress
- Lily Luik (born 1985), Estonian long-distance runner
- Lily Lyoonjung Lee (born 1969), Korean-American competitive figure skater
- Lily Marinho (1921–2011), Brazilian television arts patron, philanthropist, and socialite
- Lily Mariye (born 1964), American actress
- Lily McNicholas (1909–1998), Irish nurse in the Second World War
- Lily Monteverde (born 1938), Filipino film producer
- Lily Neo (born 1953), Singaporean medical practitioner and politician
- Lily Oddie (1937–2021), Canadian provincial politician
- Lily Osman Adams (1865–1945), Canadian painter
- Lily Owsley (born 1994), English international field hockey player
- Lily Parr (1905–1978), English footballer
- Lily Pastré (1891–1974), French heiress and patron of the arts
- Lily Peters (died 2022), American female murder victim
- Lily Phillips (born 2001), British pornographic actress
- Lily Pincus (1898–1981), German-British social worker, marital psychotherapist and author
- Lily Pons (1898–1976), French-American actress
- Lily Postlethwaite (born 2001), Australian rules footballer
- Lily Poulett-Harris (1873–1897), Australian sportswoman and educationalist
- Lily Pringsheim (1887–1954), German politician
- Lily Rabe (born 1982), American actress
- Lily Rani Biswas (born 1989), Bangladeshi women's cricketer
- Lily Renée (1921–2022), Austrian-American artist
- Lily Ross Taylor (1886–1969), American academic and author
- Lily Safra (1934–2022), Brazilian philanthropist
- Lily Saxby, British stage and film actress
- Lily Serna (born 1986), Australian mathematician and television presenter
- Lily Spencer-Churchill, Duchess of Marlborough (1854–1909), American heiress and socialite
- Lily Sullivan, Australian actress
- Lily Tembo (1981–2009), Zambian musician, radio presenter, journalist, and charity worker
- Lily Thomas (1927–2019), Indian lawyer
- Lily Tien (born 1967), Taiwanese actress
- Lily Tobias (1887–1984), British writer and activist
- Lily Tomlin (born 1939), American actress
- Lily Tuck (born 1938), American novelist
- Lily van den Broecke (born 1992), British rower
- Lily Venson (1924–2011), American journalist
- Lily Vorperian (born 1919), Syrian-born Armenian embroiderer
- Lily Wangchuk (born 1972), Bhutanese politician, diplomat, and activist
- Lily Weiding (1924–2021), Danish actress
- Lily C. Whitaker (1850–1932), American educator, writer
- Lily Yam (born 1947), Hong Kong civil servant and government official
- Lily Yeats (1866–1949), Irish embroiderer
- Lily Yeh (born 1941), Chinese American artist
- Lily Yip (born 1963), Chinese-born American table tennis player and coach
- Lily Young, professor of environmental microbiology at Rutgers, The State University of New Jersey in New Brunswick
- Lily Yulianti Farid (born 1971), Indonesian writer and journalist
- Lily Yuriko Nakai Havey (born 1932), American water color artist and author
- Lily Zhang (born 1996), American table tennis player
- Lily (singer, born 2002), stage name of Lily Jin Park Morrow, South Korean-Australian singer, member of K-pop group Nmixx

== Fictional characters ==
- Lily, a character in the Playhouse Disney TV series Johnny and the Sprites
- Lily (software), a Vocaloid mascot based on Yuri Masuda
- Lily, in the 2012 Japanese anime TV series Smile PreCure!
- Lily Aldrin, in the US TV series How I Met Your Mother
- Lily Bart, in Edith Wharton's 1905 novel The House of Mirth
- Lily Butterfield, in the UK soap opera Emmerdale
- Lily Chen, in the UK children's program Fireman Sam
- Lily Cruz, in the Philippine soap opera Wildflower
- Lily Drinkwell, in the UK soap opera Hollyoaks
- Lily Duncan, in the Canadian-French-Chinese children's animated TV series Mona the Vampire
- Lily Flores, in the New Zealand prime-time soap opera Shortland Street
- Lily Frankenstein, in the UK-US TV series Penny Dreadful
- Lily Hoshikawa, in the MAPPA idol anime series Zombie Land Saga
- Lili Marleen, 'the girl under the lantern' in а popular WWII song
- Lily Munster, in the US TV series The Munsters
- Lily Potter (née Evans), Harry's mother in J. K. Rowling's Harry Potter series
- Lily Luna Potter, Harry's daughter in Harry Potter
- Lily Pritchett-Tucker in the US TV series Modern Family
- Lily Rowan, in Rex Stout's Nero Wolfe series
- Lily C. Sherbet, in the Japanese anime/manga/sim
- Lily Stone, in the 2000 children's fantasy adventure film Thomas and the Magic Railroad, played by Mara Wilson
- Lily Walker (Doctors), on the soap opera Doctors
- Lily Winters, in the US soap opera The Young and the Restless
- Lily van der Woodsen, in the US TV series Gossip Girl

== Names with the same meaning ==
Some equivalents for the name Lily from other cultures include:

- Azucena (Spanish)
- Crina (Romanian)
- Đurđica (Croatian)
- Kielo (Finnish)
- Nari (Korean)
- Susan (Hebrew)
- Yuri (Japanese)

== See also ==
- Lili (disambiguation)
- Lilith (disambiguation)
- Lille (disambiguation)
- Lilley (disambiguation)
- Lilli (disambiguation)
- Lillie (disambiguation)
- Lily (disambiguation)
- Lilly (disambiguation)
- Nari (Korean name), a Korean feminine name meaning "lily"
- Yuri (Japanese name), a Japanese feminine name meaning "lily"
