= Lillie (name) =

Lillie is both a surname and a given name. Notable people with the name include:

== Surname ==
- Arthur Lillie (1831–1911), British soldier, Buddhist and author
- Axel Lillie (1603–1662), Swedish soldier and politician
- Beatrice Lillie (1894–1989), Canadian-born comic actress
- Denis G. Lillie (1884–1963), British biologist and Antarctic explorer
- Dennis Lillie (born 1945), Australian cricketer
- Ella Fillmore Lillie (1884–1972), American artist
- Frank Rattray Lillie (1870–1947), American zoologist
- Harold Lilie, American bridge player
- Jacqueline Lillie (born 1941). French artist and jeweller working in glass
- Jim Lillie (1861–1890), American baseball player
- John Lillie (minister) (1806–1866), Presbyterian minister in Australia
- John Lillie (politician) (1847–1921), American politician from Washington State
- John Scott Lillie (1790–1868), British Army officer
- Joseph Christian Lillie (1760–1827), Danish architect
- May Lillie (1869–1936), American Wild West entertainer
- Mildred Lillie (1915–2002), American judge
- Vanessa Lillie, American Cherokee writer

== Given name ==
- Lillie Berg (1845–1896), American musician, musical educator
- Lillie P. Bliss (1864–1931), American art collector and historian
- Lillie Burke (died 1949), American educator
- Lillie Hayward (1891–1977), American actress
- Lillie Langtry, 18th-19th century British actress
- Lillie Leatherwood (born 1964), American sprinter
- Lillie McCloud (born 1958), American singer
- Lillie May Nicholson (1884–1964), American painter
- Lillie Sullivan (1855–1903), American scientific illustrator
- Lillie, a nickname of suspected terrorist Mohammed Nazir Bin Lep

== Fictional characters ==
- Lillie, a character from the video game Pokémon Sun and Moon
- Lillie: A Lightship from the children's television series TUGS.

== See also ==
- Lily (name)
- Lilly (given name)
- Lili (given name)
