= Tiger lily =

Tiger lily or Tiger Lily may refer to:

== Plants ==
- Lilium, a genus of plants in the family Liliaceae
  - Lilium lancifolium, a lily native to northern Asia and to Japan
  - Lilium bulbiferum, a lily native to Europe
  - Lilium catesbaei, a lily species native to south-eastern North America
  - Lilium columbianum, a lily native to western North America
  - Lilium henryi, an orange lily native to central China
  - Lilium superbum, a lily native to eastern and central North America
- Daylilies, plants of the genus Hemerocallis, often called "golden needles", widely used in Asian cooking
  - Hemerocallis fulva, a daylily species native to Asia, and widely naturalized in North America

== People ==
- Tigerlily (given name)
- Tigerlily (DJ) (born 1992), Australian DJ
- Tiger Lily Hutchence-Geldof (born 1996), English-Australian singer-songwriter
- Lillie Devereux Blake (1833–1913), American suffragist, reformer, and writer

== Fiction ==
- Tiger Lily (Peter Pan), a Native American princess character from Peter Pan
- Tiger Lily, a character from the Rupert Bear comics
- The tiger-lily, a "live flower" in Through the Looking-Glass and What Alice Found There by Lewis Carroll
- Tiger Lily White, stage name of a fictional burlesque dancer portrayed by Lucille Ball in the film Dance, Girl, Dance
- Dr. Berenice "Tigerlily" Jones, a minor character in the webcomic Skin Horse by Jeffrey Wells and Shaenon Garrity
- Tigerlily Sakai, a character from the Stitch! anime

== Music ==
- The Tiger Lillies, a 1989 London band
- Tiger Lily (band), a 1970s British glam rock band
- Tigirlily Gold (formerly Tigirlily), an American country music duo
- Tiger Lily, a 1980s band founded by Laura Molina
- Tigerlily, a 1995 album by Natalie Merchant
- Tigerlily (Lillix album), 2010
- "Tiger Lily", a song by Luna from the 1994 album Bewitched
- "Tigerlily", a song by Bertine Zetlitz from the 2000 album Beautiful So Far
- "Tiger Lily", a song by The Bluetones from the 2000 album Science & Nature
- "Tiger Lily", a song by Matchbook Romance from the 2003 album Stories and Alibis
- "Tigerlily", a song by La Roux from the 2009 album La Roux
- "Tigerlily", a song by Tara VanFlower from the 2005 album My Little Fire-Filled Heart

== Places ==
- Tiger Lily, Alberta, Canada
- Tiger Lily, California, a place in El Dorado County, California, United States

== Other ==
- The Tiger Lily, a 1919 silent film drama
- 17768 Tigerlily, an asteroid
- Tigerlily (clothing), a clothing label owned by Billabong
- Tigerlily (given name), the personal name
- Tiger Lilies, an 1867 novel written by Sidney Lanier
- What's Up, Tiger Lily?, a 1966 film by Woody Allen

== See also ==
- Leopard lily (disambiguation)
