= Lilja (surname) =

Lilja is a Swedish and Finnish surname, meaning lily in both Swedish, Icelandic and Finnish.

== Geographical distribution ==
As of 2014, 58.1% of all known bearers of the surname Lilja were residents of Sweden (frequency 1:1,643), 22.9% of Finland (1:2,324), 11.5% of the United States (1:305,627), 3.0% of Denmark (1:18,091) and 1.0% of Norway (1:51,943).

In Sweden, the frequency of the surname was higher than national average (1:1,643) in the following counties:

1. Blekinge County (1:733)
2. Jönköping County (1:1,003)
3. Östergötland County (1:1,006)
4. Örebro County (1:1,308)
5. Skåne County (1:1,315)
6. Västmanland County (1:1,337)
7. Kalmar County (1:1,351)
8. Kronoberg County (1:1,357)
9. Gotland County (1:1,426)

In Finland, the frequency of the surname was higher than national average (1:2,324) in the following regions:

1. Satakunta (1:1,051)
2. Tavastia Proper (1:1,238)
3. Päijänne Tavastia (1:1,402)
4. Lapland (1:1,635)
5. Uusimaa (1:1,772)

== People ==
- Ann-Charlotte Lilja (born 1946), Swedish swimmer
- Lars Lilja (born 1954), Swedish social democratic politician
- Liisa Lilja (born 1992), Finnish paratriathlete
- Lisa Lilja (born 1996), Swedish sprinter
- Efva Lilja (born 1956), Swedish artist and professor of choreography
- Karl-Erik Lilja (born 1957), retired Swedish ice hockey player
- George Lilja (born 1958), American football offensive lineman
- James Lilja (born 1966), American gynecologic oncologist and musician
- Arto Lilja (born 1973), Finnish ski-orienteering competitor
- Max Lilja (born 1975), Finnish cello player
- Niklas Lilja, race driver and factory test driver
- Arto Lilja (born 1973), Finnish ski-orienteering competitor
- Andreas Lilja (born 1975), Swedish professional ice hockey defenceman
- Ryan Lilja (born 1981), American football center and guard
- Jakob Lilja (born 1993), Swedish ice hockey player
- Kim Lilja (born 1994), Swedish ice hockey player
- Lilja Brothers: Four brothers who enlisted in the United States Marine Corps from Natick, Massachusetts PFC George Lilja: Awarded the Navy Cross for Valor, Purple Heart, Presidential Unit Citation, Asiatic-Pacific Campaign Medal, and World War II Victory Medal. First Sgt. Ralph Lilja: Honored with the Purple Heart, Asiatic-Pacific Campaign Medal, Presidential Unit Citation, and World War II Victory Medal. Gunnery Sgt. Edwin Lilja: Received the Asiatic-Pacific Campaign Medal and Presidential Unit Citation. PFC Verner A. Lilja, Jr.: Awarded the Purple Heart.
