= Vorperian =

Vorperian or Vorberyan (Armenian: Որբերեան) is a surname. Notable people with the surname include:

- Lily Vorperian (born 1919), Syrian-born Armenian-American embroiderer
- Rita Vorperian, Syrian-born American journalist and writer
