= Lilou =

Given name

- Pronunciation: lee-LOO
- Gender: Feminine

Origin
- Origin: Catalan, French, Occitan
- Meaning: "lily" or combination of Lily and Louise
- Region of origin: France

Other names
- Related names: Leeloo, Leelou, Liliane, Lili, Liló, Lili, Lillie, Lilu, Lily, Louise, Lulu, Lylou, Malou, Milou.

Lilou is a French feminine given name. It is rising in popularity in France, where it is ranked in the top 50 names given to baby girls. It is sometimes considered a diminutive of the name Lily or a combination of the names Lily and Louise. It may also have originated as a short form of names ending in the sound "lee" such as Aurélie, Amélie, Aline, Élise, Élie, Coralie, or Liliane, following the French way of forming short forms of names by adding the suffix "ou" to affectionate names.

Actress Milla Jovovich played a character called Leeloo in the 1997 French science fiction film The Fifth Element, which might also have influenced use of the name in France.

== Women ==
- Lilou Macé (born 1977), French-American author
- Lilou Roy-Lanouette (born 2010), Canadian child actress

== See also ==
- B-boy Lilou, stage name of Algerian-French b-boy breakdancer Ali Ramdani (born 1984)
