= Leopard lily =

Leopard lily is a common name for several plants and may refer to:

- Dieffenbachia, a genus containing species cultivated as ornamental houseplants
- Fritillaria atropurpurea, native to the Western US
- Ledebouria socialis, a species native to South Africa
- Lilium catesbaei, a lily species native to southeastern North America
- Lilium pardalinum, a lily species native to western North America
- Iris domestica, a cultivated species also known as Belamcanda chinensis

== See also ==
- Leopard plant
- Tiger lily (disambiguation)
