= Lilibet =

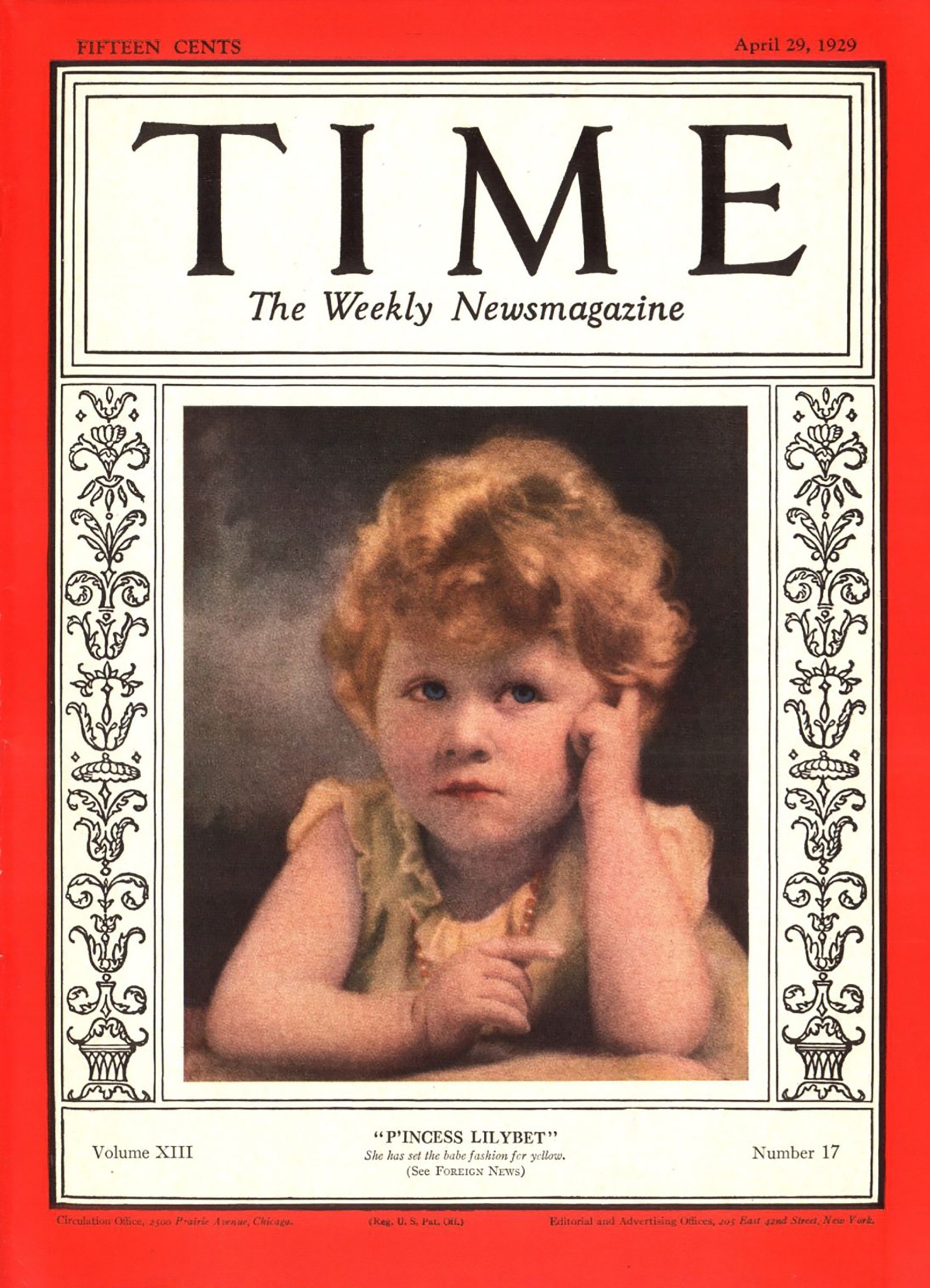
- Queen Elizabeth II, pictured at the age of three on the 29 April 1929 edition of the American news magazine Time. Her nickname was spelled Lilybet on the magazine cover.
- Pronunciation: English: /lɪliːbɛt/ or English: /lɪləbɛt/
- Gender: female

Origin
- Origin: Hebrew, Scandinavian
- Meaning: Diminutive of Elizabeth; modern Scandinavian combination of name elements Lili and Bet

Other names
- Related names: Lillibet, Lilibeth, Lillybeth, Lilybet, Lilybeth

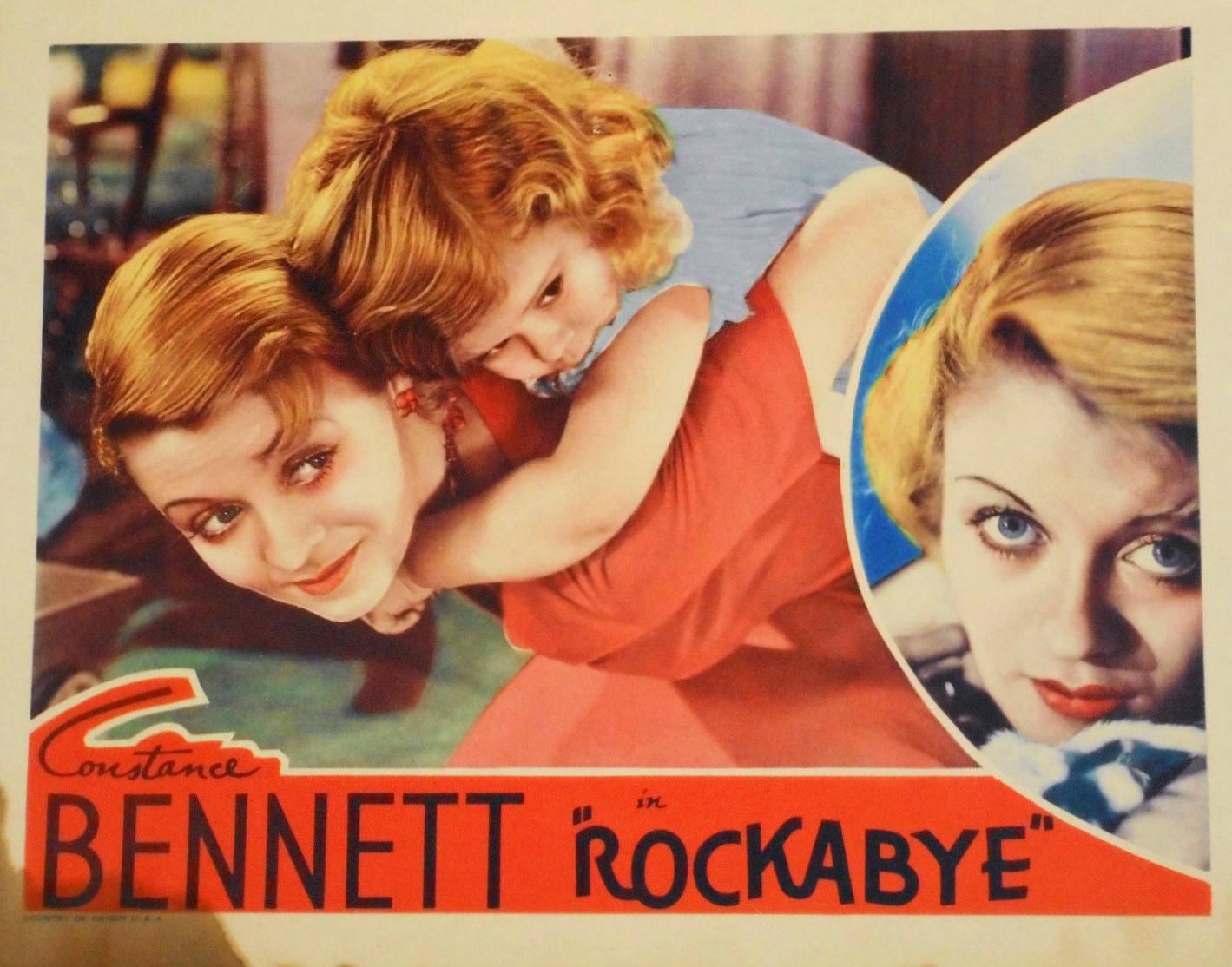
Constance Bennett portrayed Judy Carroll and June Filmer portrayed her would-be adoptive daughter Lilybet in the popular 1932 American film drama Rockabye.

Lilibet or Lillibet is a feminine given name, often a nickname for the given name Elizabeth. It was the childhood nickname of Queen Elizabeth II, who called herself "Lilibet" when she was a toddler because she had difficulty pronouncing her full name. Her great-granddaughter Princess Lilibet of Sussex was named in her honor. The name has also been spelled Lilybet in some sources. It is alternatively described as a modern combination of the name elements Lili or Lily and Bet or Beth, all of which can also be derivations of Elizabeth. Lilli is a Danish, Finnish, Norwegian, and Swedish diminutive of Elisabet, a usual version of Elizabeth throughout Scandinavia, and is also a Scandinavian diminutive of other names containing the element li such as Cecilia, Emilia, Julie, Karolina, and Olivia.

== Usage ==
The name has been in rare, occasional use worldwide. According to one report, there were 141 women named Lilibet in the United States prior to 2021, including eight American women who were born in 1999.

It was widely known since 1929 that Lilibet was the pet name of Queen Elizabeth II. The spelling Lilybet was used for the nickname of a child character named Elizabeth in the popular 1932 American film Rockabye. American director Lilibet Foster, born in 1965, was named in honor of Queen Elizabeth II. Additional attention to the name also came from the 1960 children's photographic picture book Lilibet, Circus Child, by Swedish author Astrid Lindgren and photographer Anna Riwkin-Brick. The children's book tells the story of a young girl named Lilibet who lives and plays in a traveling circus and wants to become a circus equestrienne. The book was translated into other languages and published in other countries during the 1960s.

Usage of the name increased in the United States following the birth of the Queen’s great-granddaughter in 2021. Fewer than five American girls were given the name in 2020. Twelve American girls, including Princess Lilibet, were given the name in 2021. The name increased in usage again the following year, in 2022, when twenty-five newborn American girls received the name. Forty-one American girls were named Lilibet in 2023; 27 newborn American girls were given the name in 2024; 47 newborn American girls were given the name in 2025.

Usage of the similar name Lilibeth also increased significantly in the United States, from 13 uses in 2020 to a peak of 69 uses for American girls in 2022. Some American parents apparently wanted to avoid imitating the royal family but still liked the name and used Lilibeth as a compromise. Spelling variants Lilybeth and Lillybeth also increased in use from 2020 to 2023 in the United States.

Six newborn Canadian girls were given the name Lilibet in 2023, seven newborn Canadian girls were given the name in 2024, and 11 newborn Canadian girls were given the name in 2025. Use of the name Lilibet has also increased in the United Kingdom. Fewer than three newborn girls were given the name in the United Kingdom in previous years, but the name was used for eight newborn girls in England and Wales in 2021 after the birth of Princess Lilibet. There were 29 girls born in 2022 in England and Wales who were named Lilibet. Another 33 girls born in England and Wales in 2023 were named Lilibet. No girls born in Scotland were given the name in 2021, but one girl was named Lilibet in Scotland in 2022 and two Scottish girls were given the name Lilibet in 2023. However, the name remains rare throughout the English-speaking world. The name is also used elsewhere. Both Lilibet and variant Lillibeth have been in occasional use for girls in Sweden, Finland, and Denmark. Two newborn girls were named Lilibet in Poland in 2022.

Increased usage of the name and its variants coincided with publicity about the British royal family. An official photograph of Princess Lilibet was released to the media to celebrate her first birthday in June of 2022. The child and her family were also featured in the Netflix documentary Harry & Meghan released in December of 2022, which was the most watched premiere for a Netflix show in the United Kingdom in 2022. Queen Elizabeth II died on 8 September 2022.

== Notable people ==
- Elizabeth II (1926–2022), Queen of the United Kingdom and other Commonwealth realms (nicknamed "Lilibet" by family)
- Lilibet Foster (born 1965), American director, producer and writer
- Princess Lilibet of Sussex (born 2021), granddaughter of King Charles III
- Zheng Haohao (born 2012), Chinese skateboarder and Olympian whose English nickname is Lilibet

== Fictional characters ==
- Lilibet, the name used for the central character of the 1960 children's book Lilibet, Circus Child by Swedish author Astrid Lindgren and photographer Anna Riwkin-Brick.
- Lilybet, a child character played by June Filmer in the 1932 American film Rockabye

== See also ==
- Lilibeth, a similar name or nickname
