= Milou (given name) =

Origin
- Origin: Dutch, French
- Meaning: Combination of Marie and Louise

Other names
- See also: Lilou, Louise, Malou, Marie.

Milou is a feminine given name, a contraction of the names Marie and Louise, but historically a nickname for Émile or Émilie, and also a feminine form of the Czech word milý ("kind, dear"). It is also the name of a dog in the comic strip The Adventures of Tintin. It is a currently popular name for girls in the Netherlands.
