= Granderson =

Granderson is a surname. Notable people with the surname include:

- Carl Granderson (born 1996), American football player
- Curtis Granderson, Major League Baseball player
- Lily Ann Granderson, 19th century teacher
- LZ Granderson, American sportswriter
- Rufus Granderson, American football player
