= Lilja =

Lilja is an Icelandic, Swedish, and Faroese name, the equivalent of the English Lily. It is in regular use in Iceland, Finland, Sweden, Denmark, Norway, and the Faroe Islands. It is also a Finnish and Swedish surname with the same meaning. Liljá is a Sámi spelling of the name.

As a given name, it may refer to:

- Lilja Dögg Alfreðsdóttir (born 1973), the Icelandic Minister of Education, Science and Culture
- Guðfríður Lilja Grétarsdóttir (born 1972), Icelandic politician, a member of Althing
- Lilja Guðmundsdóttir (born 1955), Icelandic middle-distance runner
- Lilja Rafney Magnúsdóttir (born 1957), Icelandic politician
- Lilja Sigurdardottir (born 1972), Icelandic crime-writer and playwright
- María Lilja Þrastardóttir (born 1986), Icelandic journalist, author and women's rights activist
- Lilja Katsuragi (葛城リーリヤ, Katsuragi Rīriya), a character in the game Gakuen Idolmaster

== Other uses ==
- Lilja, religious poem by Eysteinn Ásgrímsson

== See also ==
- Lilja (surname), Swedish and Finnish surname, meaning lily in both Swedish and Finnish
- Iselilja
