= Liliana =

Liliana is a form of Lillian used in various countries.

Notable people and fictional characters with the name include:

== People ==
- Liliana Abud, Mexican actress in telenovelas and cinema
- Liliana Allen (born 1970), Cuban track and field athlete, competing for Mexico
- Liliana Leah Archibald (1928–2014), English insurance broker
- Liliana Ayalde, American diplomat, former United States ambassador to Brazil
- Liliana Berezowsky (born 1944), Canadian sculptor
- Liliana V. Blum (born 1974), Mexican short story writer
- Liliana Campos (born 1971), Portuguese television presenter and model
- Liliana Castro (born 1979), Ecuadorian-born Brazilian actress
- Liliana Cavani (born 1933), Italian film director and screenwriter
- Liliana Chalá (born 1965), female athlete from Ecuador
- Liliana Díaz Mindurry (born 1953), Argentine writer
- Liliana Delfino, Marxist of Argentina
- Liliana Dobrescu (born 1971), freestyle swimmer from Romania
- Liliana Fellner (born 1957), Argentine Justicialist Party politician
- Liliana Gafencu (born 1975), Romanian rower who has won three Olympic gold medals
- Claudia Liliana González (born 1970), Colombian actress
- Liliana Heker (born 1943), Argentine writer
- Liliana Herrero (born 1948), Argentine musician
- Liliana Kostova, Bulgarian football striker
- Liliana Lewińska (born 2008), Polish rhythmic gymnast
- Liliana Lovell (born 1967), entrepreneur, founder of the Coyote Ugly Saloon and Ugly Inc
- Liliana Lozano (1978–2009), Colombian actress and beauty queen
- Liliana Martinelli (born 1970), female discus thrower from Argentina
- Liliana Mayo (born 1952), Peruvian psychologist and special education teacher
- Liliana Mumy (born 1994), American teen actress and voice actress
- Liliana Năstase (born 1962), Romanian heptathlete
- Liliana Negre de Alonso (born 1954), Argentine politician
- Liliana Olivero (born 1956), member of the provincial legislature in Córdoba Province, Argentina
- Liliana Ortega (born 1965), Venezuelan professor, human rights lawyer and advocate
- Liliana Palihovici (born 1971), Moldovan politician
- Liliana Popescu (born 1982), Romanian middle-distance runner
- Liliana Porter (born 1941), contemporary artist from Argentina
- Liliana Queiroz (born 1985), Portuguese model
- Liliana Rojas-Suarez (born 1954), Peruvian-born economist
- Liliana Ronchetti (1927–1974), Italian basketball player
- Liliana Santos (born 1980), Portuguese actress and model
- Liliana Zagacka (born 1977), Polish triple jumper

== Fictional characters ==
- Liliana Vess, necromancer in the trading card game Magic: The Gathering
- Lilliana Hoffman, the main protagonist in Snow White: A Tale of Terror

== See also ==
- Ljiljana, the Serbian form of Liliana
- Lobocla liliana, commonly called Marbled Flat, a hesperiid butterfly which is found in Asia
- Macomona liliana, or the large wedge shell, a bivalve mollusc of the family Tellinidae
- Tomb of Liliana Crociati de Szaszak, tomb in Recoleta Cemetery, Buenos Aires, Argentina, known for its unusual design
