= Ljiljana =

Ljiljana (Cyrillic script: Љиљана) is a feminine given name. It may refer to:

- Ljiljana Aranđelović (born 1963), Serbian politician and former presidential candidate in the Serbian presidential election, 2004
- Ljiljana Blagojević (born 1955), actress
- Ljiljana Buttler (1944–2010), singer born in former Yugoslavia
- Ljiljana Čolić (born 1956), former Minister for Education and Sport in the Government of Serbia
- Ljiljana Crepajac (1931–2018), Serbian classical scholar, philologist, a full-time professor at the University of Belgrade
- Ljiljana Gardijan (born 1988), Serbian footballer
- Ljiljana Ljubisic, Canadian paralympic athlete
- Ljiljana Zelen Karadžić (1945–2026), the wife of the war crimes suspect and former Bosnian Serb leader Radovan Karadžić
- Ljiljana Mugoša (born 1962), former Yugoslav handball player
- Ljiljana Nikolovska (born 1964), singer of Croatian and Macedonian origin
- Ljiljana Petrović (1939–2020), singer
- Ljiljana Raičević (born 1947), human rights and women's rights activist
- Ljiljana Ranković (born 1993), Serbian volleyball player
- Ljiljana Smajlović (born 1956), Serbian journalist
- Ljiljana Vukajlović, Serbian pianist and accompanist

== See also ==
- Liliana English form of Ljiljana
