= John Lillie =

John Lillie may refer to:

- John Lillie (minister) (1806–1866), Presbyterian minister in Australia
- John Lillie (politician) (1847–1921), American representative from Washington State
- John Scott Lillie (1790–1868), British Army officer

== See also ==
- John Lilly (disambiguation)
- John Lilley (disambiguation)
