= John Lilly =

John Lilly may refer to:

- John C. Lilly (1915–2001), American physician, psychoanalyst and writer
- John Lilly (computer scientist) (born 1971), former chief executive officer of the Mozilla Corporation
- John Lilly (priest) (died 1825), Archdeacon of Hereford
- John Lilly (writer) (c. 1553–1606), English writer

== See also ==
- John Lilley (disambiguation)
- John Lillie (disambiguation)
