= Lilibeth =

- Pronunciation: English: /lɪliːbɛθ/
- Gender: female

Origin
- Meaning: diminutive of Elizabeth or combination of Lily and Beth

Other names
- Related names: Beth, Elizabeth, Lilibet, Lily, Lillybeth, Lilybeth

Lilibeth is a feminine given name. It often a nickname for the given name Elizabeth. It can also be a combination of the names Lily and Beth.

The name has historically been particularly well-used among Hispanic cultural groups. Usage of the name increased after Prince Harry, Duke of Sussex and Meghan, Duchess of Sussex gave their daughter the similar name Lilibet in 2021. There were 13 American girls called Lilibeth in 2020, 46 American girls given the name in 2021, 69 American girls who were given the name in 2022, and 57 American girls given the name in 2023.

== Notable people ==
People with the given name or nickname include:

- Lilibeth Chacón (born 1992), Venezuelan racing cyclist
- Lilibeth Morillo (born 1969), Venezuelan singer-songwriter, actress, and television host
- Lilibeth Cuenca Rasmussen (born 1970), Danish video and performance artist

== See also ==
- Lilibet, a similar name or nickname
