= Malou =

Malou is a feminine given name and a French surname. As a given name, it is a contraction of the compound name Marie-Louise. The name has been well used for girls in Denmark and in the Philippines, where it is considered a contraction of María Lourdes. Malu is a variant spelling.

== Given name ==
- Malou Aamund (born 1969), Danish politician
- Malou Ejdesgaard (born 1991), Danish former tennis player
- Malou de Guzman (born 1958), Filipino actress
- Malou Hansson (born 1983), Swedish actress, model and Miss Sweden 2002
- Malou Jacob, Filipino playwright
- Malou Lovis Kreyelkamp (born 1999), German singer
- Malou Pheninckx (born 1991), Dutch women's field hockey player
- Malou Prytz (born 2003), Swedish singer
- Malou Marcetto Rylov (born 2003), Danish footballer

== Nickname ==
- Malou Acosta-Alba, 21st century Filipino politician
- Marie Louise Asseu (1966–2016), Ivorian actress, film director and producer
- Malou von Sivers (born 1953), Swedish journalist and television host

== Surname ==
- Emmanuel Malou (born 1993), South Sudanese-Australian basketball player
- Jean-Baptiste Malou (1809–1864), Belgian theologian and Bishop of Bruges, brother of Jules Malou
- Jules Malou (1810–1886), Belgian statesman, Prime Minister of Belgium

== Stage name ==
- Malou (model) (born 1984), Danish former porn actress

== Fictional characters ==
- Marie Louise 'Malou' Beaucaire, protagonist of the film Passport to Shame (1958)
