= Nari (Korean name) =

- Hangul: 나리
- RR: Nari
- MR: Nari

Nari, also spelled Naree, is a Korean given name. The word itself is a native Korean word meaning "lily" and does not have corresponding hanja. However, since Korean given names can be created arbitrarily, it may also be a name with hanja (e.g. 娜悧).

People with this name include:

- Naomi Nari Nam (born 1985), American figure skater of Korean descent
- Na Ry (born 1985), South Korean beauty pageant winner
- Naree Song (born 1986), South Korean golfer
- Park Na-ri (born 1988), South Korean swimmer
- Kim Na-ri (born 1990), South Korean tennis player
- Jong Na-ri, North Korean swimmer, bronze medalist in synchronized swimming at the 2014 Asian Games

== See also ==
- List of Korean given names
- Lily (name)
