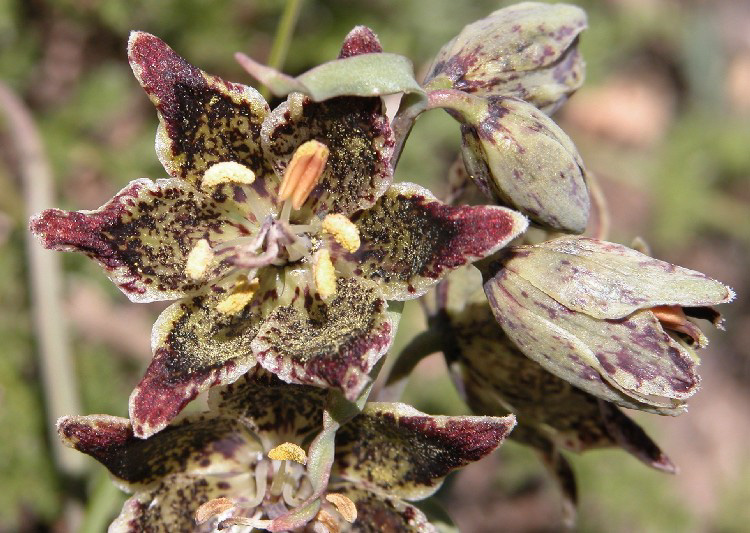

Scientific classification
- Kingdom: Plantae
- Clade: Tracheophytes
- Clade: Angiosperms
- Clade: Monocots
- Order: Liliales
- Family: Liliaceae
- Subfamily: Lilioideae
- Tribe: Lilieae
- Genus: Fritillaria
- Species: F. pinetorum

Binomial name
- Fritillaria pinetorum Davidson

Synonyms
- Fritillaria atropurpurea var. pinetorum (Davidson) I.M.Johnst.

= Fritillaria pinetorum =

Species of flowering plant

Fritillaria pinetorum, the pinewoods fritillary or Davidson's fritillary, is an uncommon species of fritillary.

It is endemic to California, USA, where it is found in shady mountain forests in the Sierra Nevada (from Sierra County to Kern County) and the San Gabriel Ranges from Santa Barbara County to San Bernardino County. There are also isolated populations in eastern Inyo County and in Modoc County.

== Description ==
Fritillaria pinetorum grows an erect stem 10–40 cm (3.9–15.7 in) high with 4 to 20 narrow, straight or curling leaves. The erect flower has six tepals each 1–2 cm long and yellow-mottled purple in color. It is similar in appearance to Fritillaria atropurpurea.
