= John Lilley (disambiguation) =

John Lilley is an American guitarist and singer songwriter, best known for being a member of rock band The Hooters.

John Lilley may also refer to:

- John Lilley (ice hockey) (born 1972), American ice hockey player
- John Lilley (soldier) (1826–1902), Medal of Honor recipient
- John M. Lilley (born 1939), university administrator

== See also ==
- Jon Lilley (born 1947), former Australian rules footballer
- John Lilly (disambiguation)
- John Lillie (disambiguation)
