= Leopard plant =

Leopard plant is a common name for several plants and can refer to:

- Drimiopsis maculata, native to Tanzania to South Africa
- Farfugium japonicum syn. Ligularia tussilaginea, also known as green leopard plant, native to Japan
- Ligularia, a genus with numerous species known as leopard plant

== See also ==
- Leopard pitcher-plant
- Leopard lily
