= Lili (given name) =

Lili is a feminine given name. Notable people with the name include:

- Lilí Álvarez (1905–1998), Spanish athlete, author, and journalist
- Lili André (born 1970), Swedish politician
- Lili Bitner, American politician
- Lili Bosse, mayor of Beverly Hills, California
- Lili Boulanger (1893–1918), French composer
- Lili Chookasian (born 1921), American operatic contralto
- Lili Damita (1904–1994), French actress
- Lili Elbe (1882–1931), one of the first identifiable recipients of male-to-female sex reassignment surgery, possibly intersex
- Lili Estefan, Cuban-American television personality
- Lili Frohlich-Bume (1886–1981), Austrian art historian
- Lili Golestan (born 1944), Iranian translator and gallerist
- Lili Haydn (born 1975), Canadian violinist, vocalist, composer, guitarist, and actress
- Lili Iskandar (born 2002), Lebanese footballer
- Lili Ivanova (born 1939), Bulgarian singer
- Lili Kraus (1903–1986), Hungarian-born British pianist
- Li Lili (1915–2005), Chinese actress
- Lili Massaferro (1926–2001), Argentine actress and militant
- Lili Milani (born 1981), Estonian geneticist
- Lili Muráti (1914–2003), Hungarian actress
- Lili Novy (1885–1958), Slovenian poet and translator of poetry
- Lili Päivärinta (born 1966), Swedish singer and artist
- Lili Qiu (born 1975), Chinese computer scientist
- Lili Reinhart (born 1996), American actress
- LiLi Roquelin, French-born American trip-hop singer-songwriter and pianist
- Lili Simmons, (born 1993), American actress
- Lili St. Cyr (1918–1999), American burlesque stripper
- Lili Tampi (born 1970), Indonesian retired badminton player
- Lili Taylor (born 1967), American actress
- Alizée (born 1984), French singer nicknamed Lili
- Princess Lilibet of Sussex (born 2021), daughter of Prince Harry, Duke of Sussex, and Meghan, Duchess of Sussex, nicknamed Lili

== See also ==
- Lily (name)
- Lilly (given name)
- Lillie (name)
