= This Womb Like Liquid Honey =

Studio album by Tara VanFlower
- Released: August 24, 1999
- Genre: Dark wave
- Length: 54:41
- Label: Projekt

Tara VanFlower chronology
This Womb Like Liquid Honey (1999)	My Little Fire-Filled Heart (2005)

This Womb Like Liquid Honey is the debut studio album of Tara VanFlower, released on August 24, 1999, by Projekt Records.

== Reception ==
Professional ratings
Review scores
Source	Rating
AllMusic	3/5 stars

AllMusic awarded the This Womb Like Liquid Honey three out of five stars and called it "a dreamlike, hazy surrealism envelops songs like "Opal Star," "Bugbear" and "Zygote the Nothing" as they catalog Vanflower's many vocal and musical moods, which embrace sweetness, seductiveness and madness."

== Track listing ==
All tracks are written by Tara VanFlower.

No.	Title	Length
1.	"Opal Star"	0:59
2.	"Pink Fingers"	5:18
3.	"This Womb Like Liquid Honey"	6:42
4.	"Little Bleu Cherry Girl"	4:56
5.	"Bugbear"	3:38
6.	"Elephant"	4:27
7.	"Ezekiel 37:1–14"	5:27
8.	"Black Fuzzy"	3:51
9.	"Galactipus"	5:43
10.	"Zygote the Nothing"	4:23
11.	"The Old Hag"	4:29
12.	"Talitha Koum"	4:47

== Personnel ==
Adapted from the This Womb Like Liquid Honey liner notes.

Musicians

- Tara VanFlower – vocals, instruments, effects
- Mike VanPortfleet – programming, engineering, mixing

Production and design

- Sam Rosenthal – design

== Release history ==
Region	Date	Label	Format	Catalog
United States	1999	Projekt	CD	PROJEKT 93
