= Lilly Yue =

US government statistician

Lilly Qinli Yue is a US government statististician, known for her work on "real-world evidence" on health care from non-clinical sources such as billing data and product registries. She is deputy director of the Division of Biostatistics in the Center for Devices and Radiological Health of the Food and Drug Administration.

== Education and career ==
Yue has a bachelor's degree in mathematics, a master's degree in stochastic operations research, and a master's degree in mathematical statistics. She completed a Ph.D. at Texas A&M University in 1996, with the dissertation Chemometric Calibration and Partial Least Squares supervised by Michael Longnecker.

She was a senior statistician at Eli Lilly and Company before moving to the Food and Drug Administration in 1998.

== Recognition ==
Yue was elected as a Fellow of the American Statistical Association in 2014. In 2020, as part of the RWE Methods Group at the FDA, she was a recipient of the FDA's Excellence in Data Science Group Award, "for extraordinary achievements in the timely development and active promotion of novel statistical methods for leveraging real-world evidence to support regulatory decision-making".
