= Helen Tse =

British author and restaurateur (born 1977)

Helen Tse MBE (born 1977) is a British author and restaurateur. Her most noted work has been Sweet Mandarin, a memoir of three generations of Chinese women, beginning with her grandmother, Lily Kwok, establishing themselves in the Manchester area.

== Early life ==
Before becoming an author and restaurateur, Tse studied law at Cambridge University and then worked in finance and law for Clifford Chance and PricewaterhouseCoopers. In 2006, she won a Young Accountant of the Year award and in 2008 she was awarded an honorary doctorate from Staffordshire University for her "contribution to literature".

Tse is one of three granddaughters of Lily Kwok; the others are Lisa and Janet. All three have continued in the hospitality business with Sweet Mandarin, a Chinese restaurant they opened together in 2004 in Manchester's Northern Quarter, where "Lily Kwok's Chicken Curry" remains a menu item.

== Writing ==
In 2007 Helen Tse published a family memoir, also called Sweet Mandarin, about her grandmother's life and career. In collaboration with Lisa Tse she has also published cookbooks based on their grandmother's recipes: Dim Sum: Small Bites Made Easy and Sweet Mandarin Cookbook

Tse was appointed Member of the Order of the British Empire (MBE) in the 2014 New Year Honours for services to the food and drink sector.

== Selected publications ==
- 2007: Sweet Mandarin: the Courageous True Story of Three Generations of Chinese Women and Their Journey from East to West. London: Ebury Press ISBN 9780091913618
- 2014: (with Lisa Tse) Sweet Mandarin Cookbook. Kyle Books ISBN 9780857832092
- 2015: (with Lisa Tse) Dim Sum: Small Bites Made Easy. Kyle Books ISBN 9780857832689
