= Lilly Be'Soer =

Papua New Guinean activist

Lilly Kolts Be'Soer is a women's rights activist from Papua New Guinea.

== Biography ==
Be'Soer was born and raised in what is now Jiwaka Province in the highlands of Papua New Guinea. She founded Voice for Change, a non-governmental organisation which focuses on ending violence against women and girls. Be'Soer is a member of the United Nations Women Asia Pacific Civil Society Advisory Group and the Jiwaka Provincial Committee on Budgeting and Planning, Chair of the Family Violence Support Group in South Whagi District of Jiwaka Province and a member of the Pacific Women's Network Against Violence Against Women. Be'Soer also established a committee to address violence related to witchcraft and sorcery and she is the General-Secretary of the United Nations Women Highlands Regional Human Rights Defenders Network. She is the director of the Rural Women's Development Initiative in Papua New Guinea.

Be'Soer has also assisted with facilitating mediation in tribal conflicts and wars. In January 2012, she coordinated a peace agreement in Jiwaka Province between clans of the Kondika tribe who had been at war since 2009. The agreement included the resettlement of about 500 internally displaced families.

=== Recognition ===
In 2010 Be'Soer received the Pacific Human Rights Defenders Award.
