= Lilly Platt =

British-born Dutch environmentalist

- Born: 18 April 2008 (age 17)
- Known for: Environmentalism

Lilly Platt (born 18 April 2008) is a British-born Dutch environmentalist. Platt is known for her youth and for going on peaceful strikes to voice out environmental concerns. She is the Global Ambassador of YouthMundus, Earth.org, and WODI; youth ambassador for Plastic Pollution Coalition and How Global; and child ambassador for the World Cleanup Day. Platt initially went viral on social media after posting litter of plastic she picked up—sorted accordingly. Over the years she has picked up more than 100,000 of pieces of litter.

Platt was born in Britain. Her family moved to Netherlands when she was seven years old.

== Environmentalism ==
In 2015, Platt was walking along a park in the Netherlands with her grandfather when she noticed litter of plastic scattered on the ground. She decided to count them to practice her Dutch. They gathered 91 pieces of plastic within 10 minutes. Her grandfather further told her how the trash ends up as plastic soup. The said incident triggered her environmental initiative, and at 7 years old, she started Lilly's Plastic Pickup. Through Lilly's Plastic Pickup, she picks up litter and sorts them meticulously. She posts them on social media so as to raise awareness on the issue. Over the years Platt has picked up more than 100,000 pieces of trash, ranging from bottles, cigarette packets, drink cartons etc. Through Lilly's Plastic Cleanup, Platt also shares the effect of plastic on wildlife and the ecosystem. Since going viral her initiative has garnered international acclaim.

Ever since she was a child, Platt has shown fondness for animals, particularly those considered physically unappealing. She was bullied in school because of this, and only one of her peers showed interest in her cleanup activities. Platt then moved to The King's School where many of her classmates participated in her clean-up efforts.

In the 2019 Dutch elections, Platt's grandfather voted on her behalf, as she is campaigning for the ban of plastic. Platt took a video and encouraged others to do the same.

In September 2018, Platt saw Greta Thunberg's protest outside the Swedish Parliament concerning the enforcement of Paris Agreement. She was inspired and decided to go on strike too. After a few weeks, Greta Thunberg joined Platt's strikes in the Netherlands, considering the Netherlands had been one of the highest emitters of greenhouse gas in the European Union. Both were invited to Brussels where they attended a climate rally outside the European Parliament.

Every Friday, Platt goes on strike outside government buildings to protest regarding the climate crisis, with or without company.
