= Crina =

Crina is a Romanian female given name. Notable people with the name include:

- Crina Georgescu (born 1960), Romanian volleyball player
- Crina Pintea (born 1990), Romanian handball player
- Crina Violeta Serediuc (born 1971), Romanian rower

== See also ==
- Rina (given name)
