= Malou (model) =

Danish model and actress (born 1984)

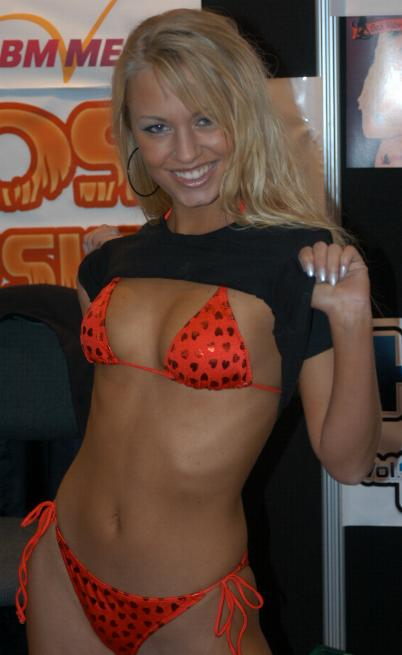
- Malou at the 2005 Adult Entertainment Expo
- Born: 1984 (age 40–41); Copenhagen, Denmark

Malou (born 1984 in Copenhagen) is a Danish former softcore porn actress and she also appeared in fetish pictures. She first got noticed in 2003 and in 2004 she became the front page girl for the magazine Eurotic. In 2005 she moved to the United States to work as a promo girl for sex products made by the company Black Video Media. Malou today resides in Copenhagen.
