= Liliana V. Blum =

Mexican short story writer

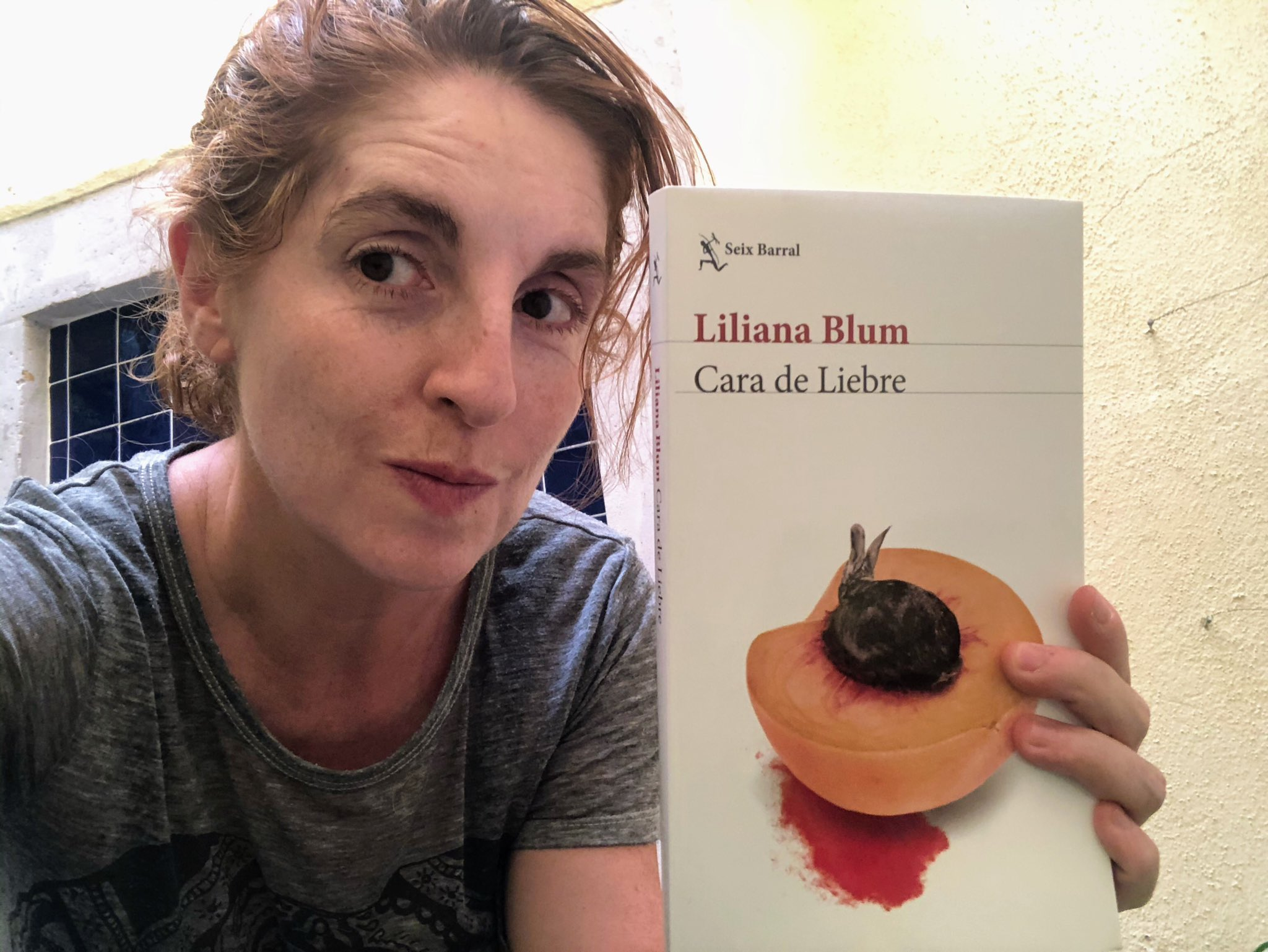
Image of Liliana Blum

Liliana Blum (born 1974) is a Mexican short story writer.

== Biography ==
Liliana Blum was born in Durango, Mexico, in 1974. Blum received her bachelor's degree in Comparative literature from the University of Kansas and her master's degree from Tec de Monterrey.

She is the author of the novels El monstruo pentápodo (Tusquets Editores, 2017) and Pandora (Tusquets Editores, 2015), as well of the novelle Residuos de espanto (Ficticia Editores 2013) and the short story collections No me pases de largo (Literal Publications, 2013), Yo sé cuando expira la leche (IMAC Durango, 2011), El libro perdido de Heinrich Böll (Editorial Jus, 2008), Vidas de catálogo (Fondo Editorial Tierra Adentro, 2007), ¿En qué se nos fue la mañana? (Institituto Tamaulipeco para la Cultura y las Artes, 2007), La maldición de Eva (Ediciones de Barlovento, 2003), and The Curse of Eve and Other Stories (Host Publications, 2008), translated by Toshiya Kamei. English translations of her stories have appeared in various literary journals, including Eclectica, Mslexia, storySouth, Blackbird, and The Dirty Goat.

The Curse of Eve and Other Stories is Blum's first book to appear in English. It contains 24 stories, most of which have female protagonists.

Writers who influenced her work include Rosario Castellanos, Margaret Atwood, and Bret Easton Ellis.

In 2005, her story "Kisses on the Forehead" was selected for storySouth's Million Writers Award Notable Stories.

== Bibliography ==
- The Curse of Eve and Other Stories translated by Toshiya Kamei (Host Publications ISBN 978-0-924047-53-4; casebound and 978-0-924047-54-1; trade paper)
