= Lillie May Nicholson =

American painter (1884–1964)

- Born: August 29, 1884 near Aromas, California, U.S.
- Died: November 28, 1964 (aged 80); Oakland, California, U.S.
- Other name: Lillie De Wolf
- Education: California State Normal School, California School of Fine Arts
- Occupations: Painter, educator
- Spouse: Paul DeWolf (divorced)

Lillie May Nicholson (1884–1964) was an American painter and educator from Northern California. Her artwork is in the collections of the Monterey Museum of Art, the Smithsonian American Art Museum, and the White House Collection. She is also known as Lillie De Wolf.

== Biography ==
Nicholson was born near Aromas, California on August 29, 1884, on the family ranch. In 1907, she graduated from the California State Normal School in San Jose and moved to Honolulu, Hawaii where she taught school for two years (1908–1910). Then she taught in Watsonville, California (1910–1911) and studied watercolor painting with L. Minnie Pardee for a year. Soon she was off to Kyoto, Japan studying art under J. Taguchi from 1911 to 1916.

After returning to California, she continued her art studies for five years at the California School of Fine Arts (which later became the San Francisco Art Institute). There she was greatly influenced by Gottardo Piazzoni. During 1921–1922 she traveled and painted in Italy and France.

She was married to Paul DeWolf in 1925 for only one year. Even though the union was short-lived she was sometimes known as Lillie De Wolf. From 1923 to 1938 she maintained a studio in Pacific Grove, California and specialized in coastal scenes and the fishing industry around Monterey. Considered an Impressionist, she chose vivid colors and used loose horizontal brush strokes.

In 1938, she changed careers and closed her art studio. After moving to Oakland, California, she became an aircraft mechanic and inspector at the Alameda Naval Air Station.

== Death and legacy ==
She lived her last 20 years in the Sutter Hotel in Oakland, California, and she died there on November 28, 1964. She was buried in Pioneer Cemetery in Watsonville.

Her work was thought to be lost until 1979 when trunks were "rediscovered" at the family ranch and found to contain many surviving artworks. Two of her pieces are held by the White House Historical Association as part of its White House Collection.

== Exhibitions ==
Nicholson's works have appeared on exhibit during and after her lifetime.

- Carmel Arts and Crafts Club, 1923–1928
- Arizona State Fair, 1927
- California State Fair, 1926–1928
- Santa Cruz Art League, 1928
- Monterey Peninsula Museum, 1981 (solo)
- Oakland Museum, 1981
- University of California, Santa Cruz, 1985
- Santa Cruz Museum, 1986 (retrospective)
