= Lilia (name) =

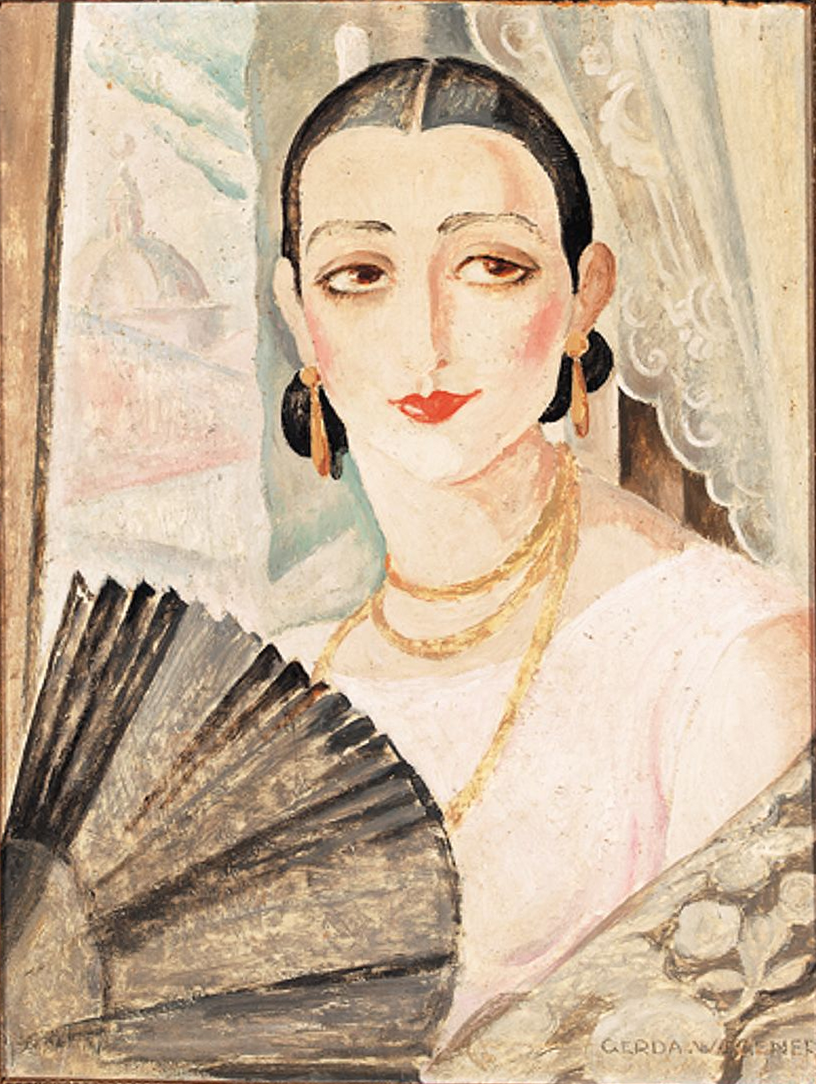
Portrait of Lili Elbe with a Fan by Gerda Wegener

Lilia is a feminine given name. Notable people with the name include:

- Lilia Abadjieva (born 1966), Bulgarian theatre director
- Lilia al-Atrash (born 1977), Syrian actress
- Lilia Amarfi (1949–2010), Soviet and Russian operetta actress
- Lilia Bolocan (born 1972), Moldovan politician
- Lilia Buckingham (born 2003), American Internet personality, actress, dancer, author, and producer
- Lilia Capocaccia (1932–2024), Italian herpetologist, museum director
- Lilia Carrillo (1930–1974), Mexican painter
- Lilia Cosman (born 2007), Romanian artistic gymnast
- Lilia Cuntapay (1935–2016), Filipina actress
- Lilia Estrin Dallin (1898–1981), Russian Trotskyist
- Lilia Dizon (1928–2020), Filipina actress
- Lilia Gildeeva (born 1976), Russian television journalist
- Lilia Gorilskaya (born 1988), Ukrainian handball player
- Lilia Ignatova (born 1965), Bulgarian rhythmic gymnast
- Lilia Izquierdo (born 1967), Cuban volleyball player
- Lilia Kopylova (born 1978), Russian dancer
- Lilia Luciano (born 1984), Puerto Rican television journalist
- Lilia Maraviglia (born 1969), Bulgarian actress
- Lilia Merodio Reza (born 1978), Mexican politician
- Lilia Michel (1926–2011), Mexican actress
- Lilia Osterloh (born 1978), American tennis player
- Lilia Podkopayeva (born 1978), Ukrainian artistic gymnast
- Lilia Prado (1928–2006), Mexican actress
- Lilia Shevtsova, Soviet-American Kremlinology expert
- Lilia Skala (1896–1994), Austrian actress
- Lilia Tarawa, former member of Gloriavale Christian Community, author, speaker, entrepreneur
- Lilia Vaygina-Efremova (born 1977), Ukrainian biathlete
- Lilia Esquilin (born 2010), family blogger and dancer
