= Lilou Macé =

French-American author

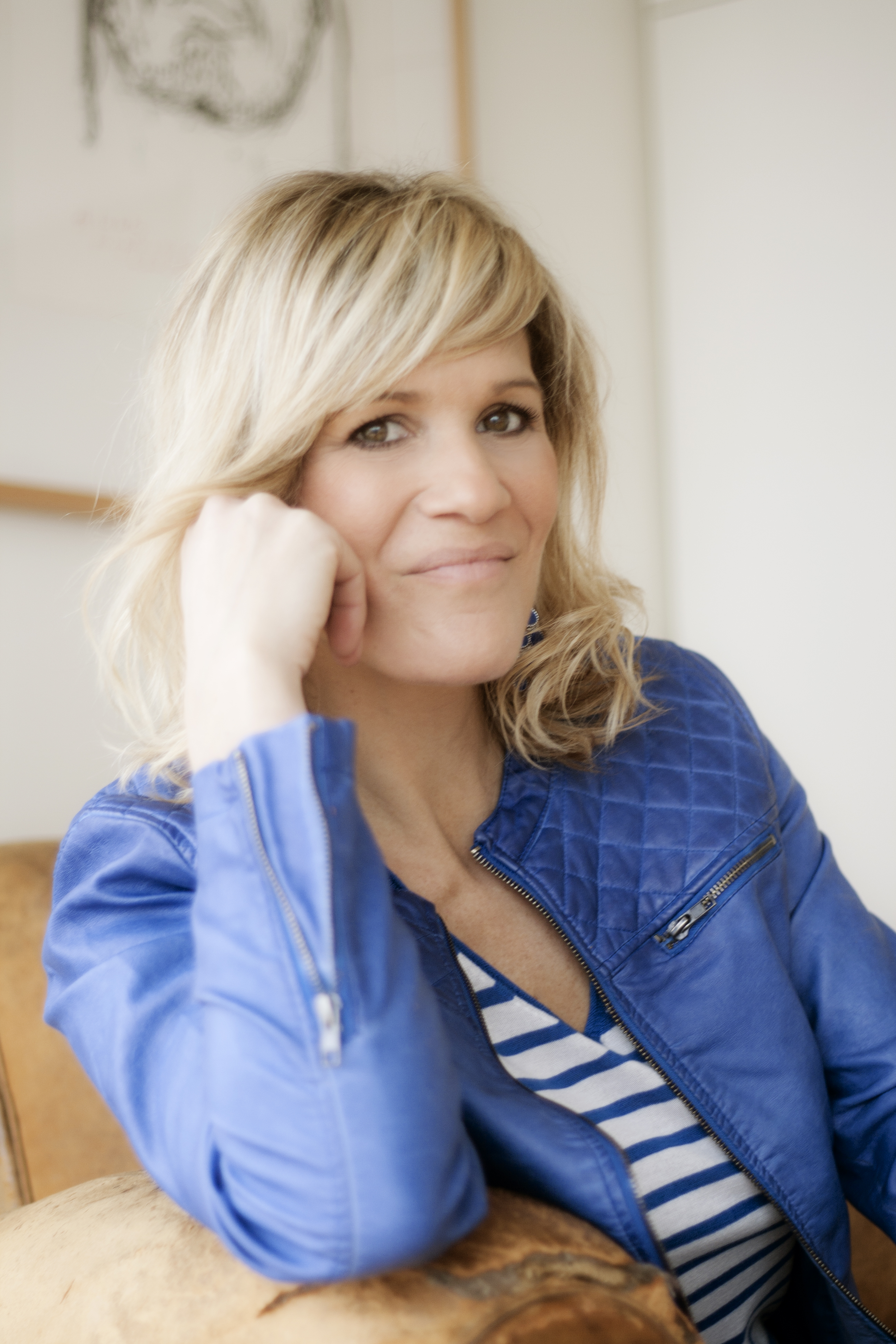
Lilou Macé (2013)

Lilou Macé (born August 20, 1977) is a French-American New-Age author, webTV host, video blogger, speaker and interviewer.

== Biography ==
Macé was born in Santa Barbara, California, to French parents, Jean-Yves Macé and Irène Martin. Moving back to France, Lilou grew up primarily in Nantes and Cholet. She also spent part of her youth in Scottsdale, Arizona. During her four-year bachelor's degree in European Business Studies (1996-2000), Mace studied at ESC La Rochelle and Oxford Brookes University and wrote her final year dissertation called How to create a strong brand online, graduating in 2000 with honours. She did a major in International Marketing and completed a 14-month internship for Nortel Networks in Maidenhead, UK and in Silicon Valley.

== Early career ==
Between November 2000 and October 2006, Lilou resided in Florida, mainly in Fort Lauderdale, Florida and moved to Chicago in October 2006, where she lived until the end of July 2008. Between January 2000 and June 2008, Lilou was self-employed, creating online branding, website design and online marketing for the hospitality industry. After the short experience in the marketing area, Lilou decided to create and focus on her YouTube channel. Her videos, based on bringing positive messages about life, career and love, gathered many hundreds of thousands of followers on several platforms, like YouTube, Facebook and Twitter. Soon after the breakthrough, Lilou Mace decided to leave her old life and focus mainly on her new YouTuber and Vlogger career.

== Juicy Living Tour ==
Shortly after moving to Chicago, on 9 November 2006, Mace met Oprah Winfrey during an episode of The Oprah Winfrey Show on the theme of “Dream Jobs”. This experience inspired her to start interviewing and a few months later, with no television or broadcasting background, Macé went on to produce and host a new-age cable TV show on CAN TV called My Juicy Life. This show aimed at inspiring people to fully live their purpose and passions in life, and featured authors such as John Gray, Sonia Choquette, and Karyn Calabrese. Ever since, she has been interviewing and video-blogging on YouTube. This became a new-age online show called the Juicy Living Tour, broadcast on YouTube and supported via donations.

The Juicy Living Tour is now called Lilou Macé TV. Mace travels the world and interviews people that share their life story, lessons and advice to live a fulfilled life. Mace has over 3000 videos and interviews online in English, French, Korean, Italian, Spanish, Japanese and has 42 million video views. In France Mace's show is called La Télé de Lilou. Her channel is also active in South America, mainly Argentina, Uruguay and Brazil.

== Author ==
In July 2008, Macé was offered a position in London as Internet Marketing Director for a luxury hotel sales-and-marketing company based in the United Kingdom. She moved back to Europe to take up this position, and only seven months later, on 16 February 2009, lost her job. The event proved to be life-changing. It inspired her to write her first book I Lost My Job and I Liked It: 30-Day Law-of-Attraction Diary of a Dream Job Seeker. Macé announced the publication of her book at the 2009 London Book Fair, where she printed the first copies on the Espresso Book Machine.

In Fall 2011, Macé's new book I Had No Money and I Liked it was published by her publishing company Juicy Living Publishing and at the end of October 2012, her book was launched in France, Belgium, Switzerland and Quebec by Tredaniel Editions.

== Interviews ==
Macé has interviewed hundreds of New Agers from all over the world about contemporary spirituality and the creation of a "happy, healthy and fulfilling life". She posts these interviews on Lilou Macé TV website and YouTube channel which has 42-million video views. Some of her more notable guests are Wayne Dyer, Jack Canfield, Carl Johan Calleman, Marianne Williamson, Barbara Marx Hubbard, Eben Alexander, Pierre Rabhi, Christian "Tal" Schaller, Bruce Lipton and Anne Givaudan. Macé organizes live interviews in front of an audience at the Theatre des Feux de la Rampe in Paris, where once a month the French audience can assist her with the interviews. She regularly organizes conferences and is invited all around the world to speak and interview. Macé offers all her interviews for free and is supported by donations.

== Bibliography ==
- I Lost My Job and I Liked It: 30-Day Law-of-Attraction Diary of a Dream Job Seeker, Juicy Living Publishing, 2009, ISBN 0956254608
- I Had No Money and I Liked It: the Abundant Journey of an Open Heart, Juicy Living Publishing, 2011, ISBN 0956254667
- Je n'ai pas de religion et ça me plait : Comment cocréer une vie qui a du sens, Ed. Trédaniel, 2014, ISBN 978-2-8132-0693-0
- Je suis célibataire et ça me plait, Ed. Trédaniel, 2016
- J'ai perdu mon job et ça me plait, Ed. Trédaniel, 2011
- Je n'ai pas d'argent et ça me plait : Vivre au coeur de l'abondance ici et maintenant, Ed. Trédaniel
- L'Oeuf de Yoni : Le féminin révélé et libéré - Tome 1, Ed. Trédaniel
- J’ai dit oui et ça me plaît: renaître et accoucher de soi-même, Ed. Trédaniel
- Je suis enceinte et ça me plait, Ed. Trédaniel
- Mon agenda de grossesse, Ed. Leducs
- Le défi des 100 jours : cahier d'exercices pour vivre la magie au quotidien, Ed. Trédaniel
- Le défi des 100 jours : cahier d'exercices pour une vie extraordinaire, Ed. Trédaniel
- Le défi des 100 jours : cahier d'exercices pour développer votre intuition, Ed. Trédaniel
- Le défi des 100 jours : cahier d'exercices pour trouver sa mission de vie et se réaliser pleinement, Ed. Trédaniel
- Le défi des 100 jours : cahier d'exercices pour réinventer sa façon de manger et pratiquer une alimentation consciente, Ed. Trédaniel
