= Lilly Jacobson =

American baseball player

Medal record

Women's baseball

Representing United States

Women's Baseball World Cup
Gold medal – first place	2006 Taiwan	2006 Tournament
Bronze medal – third place	2008 Japan	2008 Tournament

Lilly Jacobson (born June 27, 1988) is a former member of the United States women's national baseball team.

== Playing career ==
Growing up, she played in the Albany, California Little League (like former US national team member Tamara Holmes). She would also play in the Reno, Nevada Little League, and in the Babe Ruth League.

At Wooster High School in Reno, Jacobson played on the men's baseball team. She also earned letters in golf, skiing and basketball. While there, she was one of ten recipients of the Northern Nevada Student-Athletes of the Year Award. After her senior year of high school (2006), she was contacted by Jim Glennie about attending the Western Regional Tryouts for Team USA.

Qualifying for the Team USA roster as a relief pitcher, she was converted to designate hitter by manager Julie Croteau. As a side note, she was one of four teenagers to qualify for the Team USA roster in 2006.

She would attend Vassar College in Poughkeepsie, New York on a golf scholarship. As a sophomore at Vassar, she played on the baseball team. She would eventually join the University of California at Berkeley in 2009, competing on their club team.

Jacobson also played with the New England Women's Red Sox. Under the tutelage of head coach Kevin Marden, she was part of the Red Sox team that captured the 2012 Roy Hobbes Championship.

== Awards and honors ==
- 2008 Women's World Cup All-Tournament Team (Outfield)

== Bibliography ==
- Ring, Jennifer (2015). "Chapter 13: Lilly Jacobson". A Game of Their Own: Voices of Contemporary Women in Baseball. Lincoln and London: University of Nebraska Press. pp. 211–239. ISBN 978-0803244801.
