= Lilly Sanathanan =

Indian statistician

Lalitha (Lilly) Padman Sanathanan is an Indian statistician.

Sanathanan's early research concerned estimation of population size from sampled data, in the context of particle physics. She completed her Ph.D. in 1969, at the University of Chicago; her dissertation, Estimating Population Size in the Particle Scanning Context, was supervised by David Lee Wallace. After several years as an assistant and associate professor at the University of Illinois Chicago, she moved to Argonne National Laboratory in the late 1970s.

By 1991 she had shifted career direction, to drug development. After working as a senior statistician at Abbott Laboratories, associate director of statistics for Ciba-Geigy, and director of research statistics for Smith, Kline & French, she became a director in the Center for Drug Evaluation and Research of the Food and Drug Administration. She was named a Fellow of the American Statistical Association in 1990. In 1991 she returned to private industry, as vice president of biostatistics and clinical data systems at the Institute for Biological Research and Development in Irvine, California. She later founded ClinWorld, a binational (US and Indian) clinical research organisation, which was purchased by Indian health corporation Sami Labs (now the Sami-Sabinsa Group) in 2003.

In 2008 she published a self-help book, Life Vest, in Bangalore. She continues to operate a Florida-based statistics firm, STATLINK, and is a contributor to a cross-cultural podcast, the Global India Podcast.
