= My Little Fire-Filled Heart =

Studio album by Tara VanFlower
- Released: May 6, 2005
- Genre: Dark wave
- Length: 65:46
- Label: Silber

Tara VanFlower chronology
This Womb Like Liquid Honey (1996)	My Little Fire-Filled Heart (2005)	Beneath the Moon (2006)

My Little Fire-Filled Heart is the second studio album by Tara VanFlower, released in May 6, 2005, by Silber Records.

== Reception ==
Professional ratings
Review scores
Source	Rating
AllMusic	4/5 stars

AllMusic awarded the My Little Fire-Filled Heart four out of five stars and said it "continues in the same striking, loving vein as her first – it's the sound of someone confounding expectations based on her group work to make her own personal, entrancing statement. "

== Track listing ==
All tracks are written by Tara VanFlower, except "The Honour of Silence" by Douglas Pearce.

No.	Title	Length
1.	"Ligertily"	0:54
2.	"Yaya"	3:18
3.	"Rabbit"	6:48
4.	"The Honour of Silence" (Death in June cover)	3:52
5.	"Naked King"	5:48
6.	"Silverback"	6:53
7.	"The Girl From the Green Dimension"	7:37
8.	"I Lost the Moon"	6:27
9.	"A Rusted Nail Through the Wrist"	4:03
10.	"A Conversation With Death"	8:01
11.	"Wren"	11:28
12.	"Tigerlily"	0:37

== Personnel ==
Adapted from the My Little Fire-Filled Heart liner notes.

Musicians

- Tara VanFlower – vocals, mixing, photography

Production and design

- Mike VanPortfleet – mastering, design

== Release history ==
Region	Date	Label	Format	Catalog
United States	2005	Silber	CD	silber 093
