= Liliana Díaz Mindurry =

Argentine writer

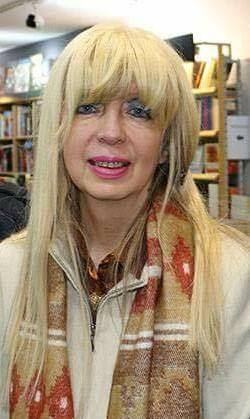
Liliana Díaz Mindurry (2017)

Liliana Díaz Mindurry (born 1953) is an Argentine writer.

== Biography ==
Liliana Díaz Mindurry was born in Buenos Aires, Argentina in 1953. She earned a law degree at the University of Buenos Aires, where she had previously taught philosophy of law. She was forced to flee to France during the military dictatorship. She stayed there for seven years, until democracy was restored to Argentina. Since then, she has devoted herself exclusively to writing. She leads the literary group Malosayres. She has received several prizes.

Since 1989, she has coordinated literary workshops at various institutions and since the mid-1980s she has been publishing steadily a personal narrative with a strong poetic tone.

She has been translated into German and Greek. Some of her poems have been published in Medellín, Colombia, and Salzburg, Austria.

== Awards and honours ==
- Juan Rulfo Prize (1993 and 1994)
- First Municipal Prize of Buenos Aires (1991)
- First prize, Embassy of Greece (1990)
- Antorchas Foundation Prize (1991)
- First prize, National Fund for the Arts (1994)
- Planeta Prize (1998)
- Mexican Cultural Center prize

== Works ==
Buenos Aires, ciudad de la magia y de la muerte (1985), La resurrección de Zagreus (1988), La estancia del sur (1990), Sinfonía en llamas (1990), Paraíso en tinieblas (1991), En el fin de las palabras (1992), A cierta hora (1993), Retratos de infelices (1993), Wonderland (1993), Lo extraño (1994), Ultimo tango en Malos Ayres (1998), Lo indecible (1998), Pequeña música nocturna (1998), Summertime (2000), Hace Miedo Aquí.
