= Lilly Adong =

Ugandan politician and member of Parliament (born 1976)

Member of the Parliament of Uganda
- Incumbent
- Assumed office 2011

Personal details
- Born: February 2, 1976 (age 50)
- Citizenship: Ugandan
- Party: Independent politician
- Education: Makerere University; Institute of Housing & Urban Development Studies in Rotterdam; Law Development Center, Kampala; Uganda Management Institute
- Occupation: Politician

Lilly Adong (born 2 February 1976) is a Ugandan politician and member of Parliament since 2011, she serves as a woman representative in the Parliament of Uganda for the Nwoya district.

She is an independent politician.

== Education ==
Adong earned her Bachelor's degree of arts in education at Makerere University in 2000. In 2003, she was awarded a diploma in strategic environmental education from the Institute of Housing & Urban Development Studies in Rotterdam.

Later, in 2005, she earned a certificate in law at the Law Development Center in Kampala. In 2008, she did a postgraduate diploma in conflict management and peace studies at Gulu University. In 2010 she did a postgraduate diploma in public administration and management at the Uganda Management Institute. She did a masters of public administration and management studies at the Uganda Management Institute in 2014.

== Other responsibilities ==
She served as a District Disaster Preparedness Coordinator in the office of the prime minister in Amuru District from 2009 to 2010.

From 2003 to 2009, she served as a Senior Assistant Secretary in Amuru and Gulu District local governments.

From 2006 to 2007, she served as a clerk to council (Amuru district local government).
