= Lili Milani =

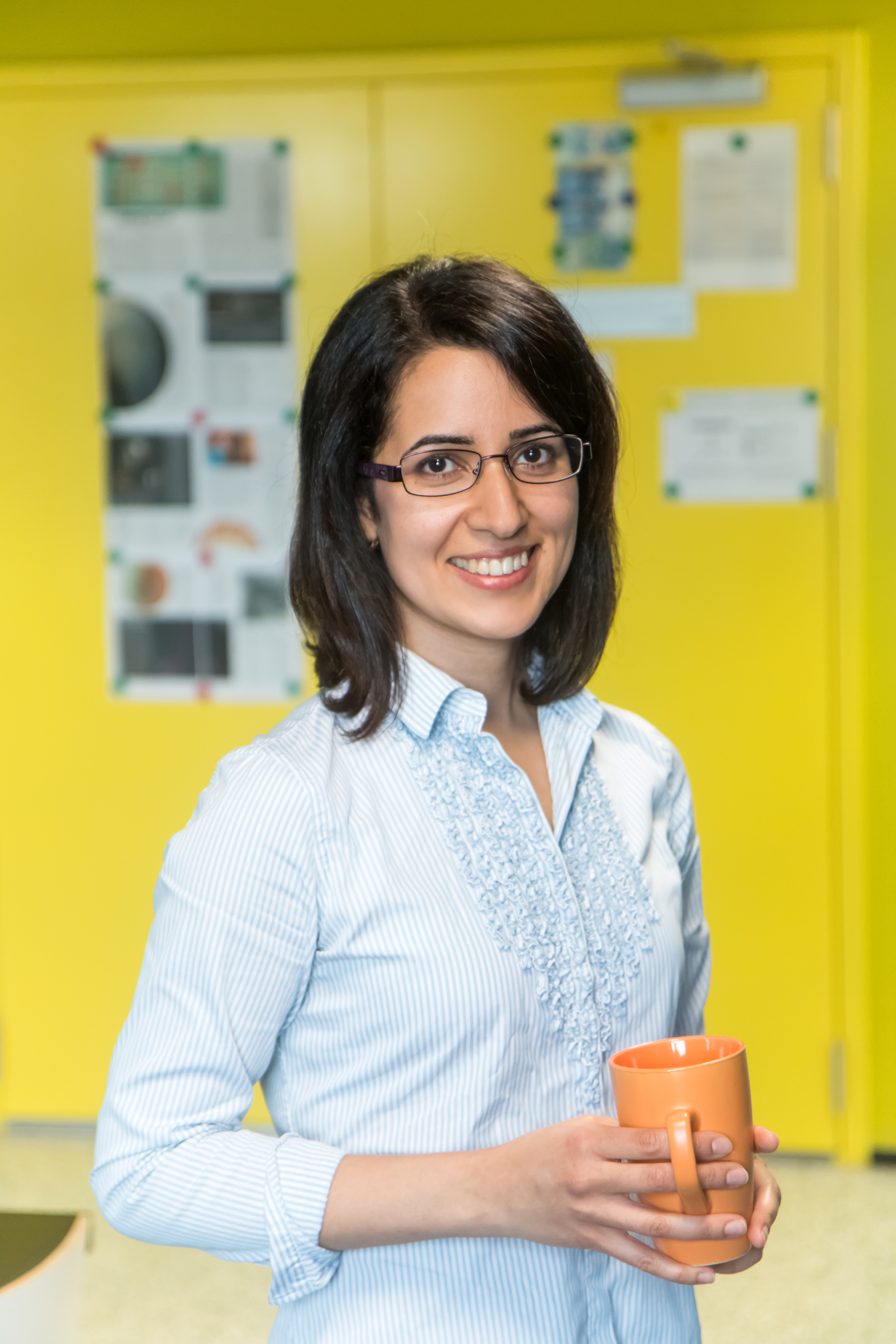
- Born: 27 November 1981 (age 44); Sweden
- Education: Uppsala University
- Occupation: Geneticist
- Employer: University of Tartu

Lili Milani (born 27 November 1981) is an Estonian geneticist. She is a pharmacogeneticist and professor at the University of Tartu and director of the Estonian gene database.

== Biography ==
Lili Milani was born in Sweden to Iranian immigrants, where her father was a university lecturer in physics. In 1994, her father moved to Tallinn University of Technology, and the family followed him to Estonia. Lili Milani attended school in Estonia and, after graduating, university. From 2000, she studied genetic engineering at the University of Tartu. During her studies, she worked as a research assistant at the Department of Pathological Anatomy and Forensic Medicine. She graduated in 2004 with a Bachelor of Science degree. She then pursued doctoral studies at Uppsala University. Simultaneously, she worked as a research assistant at the WCN SNP Genotyping Unit . She received her PhD from Uppsala University in 2009 and subsequently remained there as a postdoctoral researcher . After a period of parental leave, Milani returned to the University of Tartu in 2010 as a postdoctoral researcher and simultaneously worked at the Estonian Genetic Database located there. From 2011, she headed the sequencing and genotyping department at the Genetic Database. After a brief period as an assistant professor at Uppsala University, she returned to Tartu in 2018, where she took over the management of the Genetic Database and a research professorship at the university. In 2021, she was appointed full professor of pharmacogenetics.

== Research ==
Milani's research focuses on epigenetics and pharmacogenetics. In particular, she investigates the influence of genetic variations on drug metabolism and prescription adherence. Her research also examines medication adherence and the development of adverse drug reactions. She participates in research projects addressing the prevention and treatment of cardiovascular diseases and mental disorders.
