= Jacqueline Lillie =

French artist and glass jewellery designer

Jacqueline I. Lillie
- Born: Jacqueline I. Lillie ca. 1941; Marseille, France
- Education: University of Applied Arts Vienna
- Occupation(s): Artist and jeweller

Jacqueline I. Lillie (born 1941) is a French artist and jeweller of Austrian-descent, working in glass. Her work is held in the permanent collection of the Metropolitan Museum of Art in New York City, USA, the Corning Museum of Glass in New York, USA and the National Gallery of Australia.

== Biography ==
Lillie was born in Marseille, France, to immigrant Austrian parents. She studied metalwork with Professor Hagenauer at the Academy of Applied Arts in Vienna, Austria.
