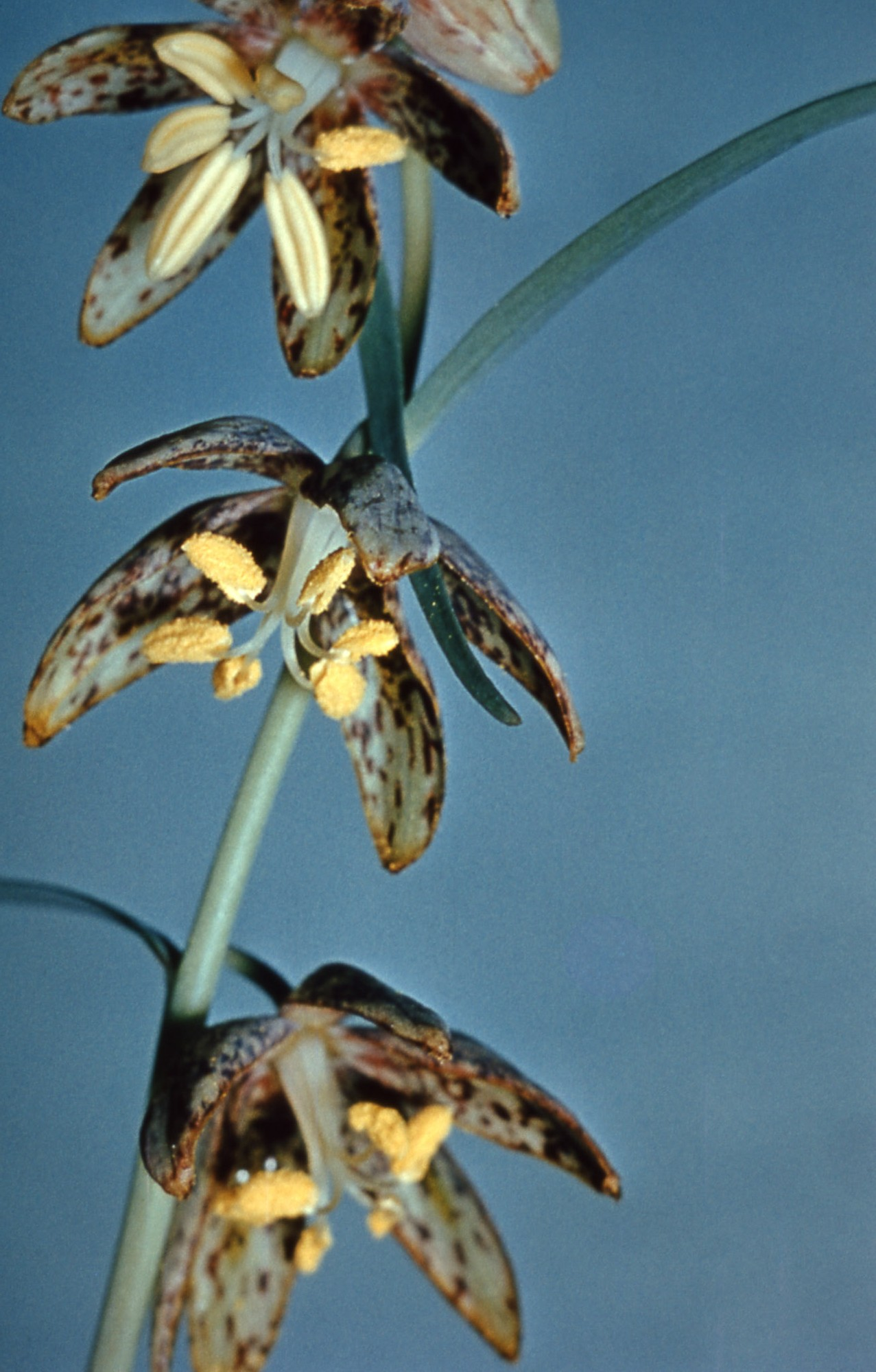

Conservation status
- Secure (NatureServe)

Scientific classification
- Kingdom: Plantae
- Clade: Tracheophytes
- Clade: Angiosperms
- Clade: Monocots
- Order: Liliales
- Family: Liliaceae
- Subfamily: Lilioideae
- Tribe: Lilieae
- Genus: Fritillaria
- Species: F. atropurpurea

Binomial name
- Fritillaria atropurpurea Nutt.

Synonyms
- Amblirion album (Nutt.) Sweet; Fritillaria adamantina M.Peck; Fritillaria alba Nutt.; Fritillaria atropurpurea var. gracillima (Smiley) D.W.Taylor; Fritillaria gracillima Smiley; Fritillaria linearis J.M.Coult. & Fisher

= Fritillaria atropurpurea =

Plant species in the lily family

Fritillaria atropurpurea is a species of fritillary known by several common names, including spotted fritillary, purple fritillary, spotted mountainbells, spotted missionbells, and leopard lily.

== Distribution ==
Fritillaria atropurpurea is native to the Western United States, where it is often found beneath trees in moldy leaf litter at elevations of 1000–3200 m. This species has the widest distribution of fritillaries in North America, growing from California, Arizona and New Mexico north to Oregon and North Dakota.

== Description ==
Fritillaria atropurpurea stems are 10–20 cm (3 7/8–7 7/8 in) in height and bear narrow, pointed leaves. The nodding flower has spreading tepals each one or two centimeters long which are yellowish or cream colored with heavy dark purple-brown mottling. The center of the flower has a central style surrounded by stamens with very large yellow anthers.

This species is similar to Fritillaria pinetorum, but it has nodding flowers compared with the latter's erect blooms.
