= Arto Lilja =

Finnish ski orienteering competitor

Medal record

Representing Finland

Men's Ski-orienteering

World Championships
Bronze medal – third place	2004 Östersund	Middle
Bronze medal – third place	2004 Östersund	Relay

World Cup
Bronze medal – third place	2003	Overall WC

Arto Lilja (born 16 April 1973) is a Finnish ski-orienteering competitor. He won a bronze medal in the middle distance at the 2004 World Ski Orienteering Championships. He placed third in the overall World Cup in 2003.

== See also ==
- Finnish orienteers
- List of orienteers
- List of orienteering events
