= Lily Kwok =

Chinese-born restaurateur

Lily Kwok (26 September 1918 – 8 December 2007), also known as Sui King Kwok and Sui King Leung, was a Chinese-born restaurateur in the Manchester area.

== Early life and family ==
Sui King Leung was born in the Guangdong province of China, in a family of six daughters. Her father was a small businessman, who manufactured and sold soy sauce to restaurants in Hong Kong. The family moved to Hong Kong when Sui King Leung was a girl. When her father was killed by rivals, she and her sisters were considered ineligible to inherit his factory; instead, the daughters supported themselves with sewing, making deliveries, and domestic service.

Sui King Leung married Kwok Chan in 1946, when she was seventeen. They had three children together. When the Kwoks separated in the early 1950s, Sui King Kwok went back into domestic service, this time as a caregiver in an English family, the Woodmans. She started using the name "Lily Kwok" in their household. When the Woodmans returned to England in 1953, Lily Kwok went with them.

== Career in England ==
Lily Kwok continued to work for the Woodmans at their home in Somerset. In 1959, the Woodmans gave Lily Kwok a loan to start a restaurant in Middleton, near Manchester. Lung Fung was one of the first Chinese restaurants in the United Kingdom, and became a popular late-night stop for musicians and celebrities. She soon added two satellite locations for takeaway, in Bury and Blackburn. In the 1970s she was forced the sell all three locations to settle gambling debts. She opened another restaurant, Lung Fung Too, and left that business to her family when she retired in 1993.

== Legacy ==
Lily Kwok died in 2007, in Rochdale, aged 89 years. Her three granddaughters, Lisa, Janet, and Helen Tse, have continued in the hospitality business with Sweet Mandarin, a Chinese restaurant they opened together in 2004 in Manchester, where "Lily Kwok's Chicken Curry" remains a menu item. In 2007 Helen Tse published a family memoir, also called Sweet Mandarin about her grandmother's life and career, which has subsequently gone on to be adapted into a stage play by the Royal Exchange Theatre, Yellow Earth and Black Theatre Live. Lisa Tse and Helen Tse have also published cookbooks based on their grandmother's recipes.
