= Michael Longnecker =

American scientist and the George P

Michael T. Longnecker is an American scientist specialized in animal science and entomology at Texas A&M University. He is the George P. Mitchell '44 Endowed Chair in Statistics Science at Texas A&M University, and also a published author of 8 books which are held in 566 libraries, the highest held book being in 449 libraries worldwide.
