= Lilly Williams =

American baseball player

- Infielder

Negro league baseball debut
- 1940, for the Philadelphia Stars

Last appearance
- 1941, for the Philadelphia Stars
- Stats at Baseball Reference

Teams
- Philadelphia Stars (1940–1941)

Lilly Williams is an American former Negro league infielder who played in the 1940s.

Williams played for the Philadelphia Stars in 1940 and 1941. In his ten recorded games, he posted eight hits and three RBI in 25 plate appearances.
