= Ljiljana Gardijan =

Serbian footballer (born 1988)

Personal information
- Date of birth: 28 December 1988 (age 37)
- Position: Goalkeeper

Team information
- Current team: Sloga Zemun

Senior career*
Years	Team	Apps	(Gls)
- Spartak Subotica
- Pomurje
- Vllaznia
- Pomurje
- Sloga Zemun

International career^{‡}
2009–	Serbia	9	(0)
- * Club domestic league appearances and goals ‡ National team caps and goals as of 18 September 2020.

Ljiljana Gardijan (Serbian: Љиљана Гардијан; born 28 December 1988) is a Serbian footballer who plays as a goalkeeper for Women's Super League club ŽFK Sloga Zemun and the Serbia women's national team.

== Club career ==
Gardijan has played for ŽFK Spartak Subotica in Serbia, for ŽNK Pomurje in Slovenia and for KFF Vllaznia Shkodër in Albania.

== International career ==
Gardijan capped for Serbia at senior level during the 2011 FIFA Women's World Cup qualification.
