= Liisa Lilja =

Finnish paratriathlete

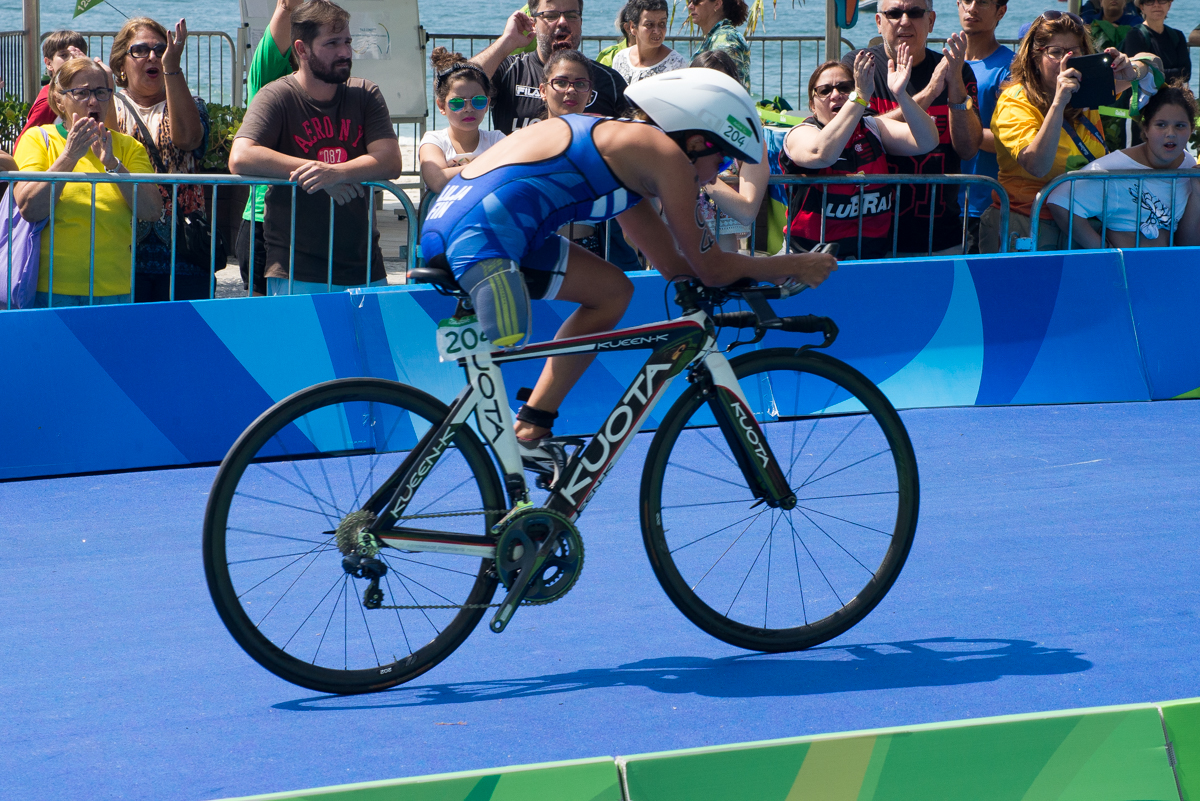
- Lilja at 2016 Summer Paralympics

Personal information
- Born: 26 August 1992 (age 33) Pori, Finland

Sport
- Country: Finland
- Sport: Paratriathlon
- Disability: Bone cancer survivor
- Disability class: PTS2
- Coached by: Tommi Martikainen
Medal record
Women's paratriathlon
Representing Finland
World Championships
Gold medal – first place	2017 Rotterdam	PTS2
Silver medal – second place	2016 Rotterdam	PT2
Bronze medal – third place	2021 Abu Dhabi	PTS2
European Championships
Gold medal – first place	2017 Kitzbühel	PTS2
Silver medal – second place	2015 Geneva	PT2
Silver medal – second place	2016 Lisbon	PT2
Silver medal – second place	2019 Valencia	PTS2
Silver medal – second place	2021 Valencia	PTS2

Liisa Lilja (born 26 August 1992) is a Finnish paratriathlete who competes in international elite events. She is a World silver medalist, European champion and competed at the 2016 Summer Paralympics finishing in fourth place.

Lilja was diagnosed with bone cancer in her right leg when she was eight years old and her right leg got amputated above the knee when she was ten years old. She began rehabilitation by doing swimming lessons and started competing in paratriathlon internationally in 2014.

== Training accident ==
In November 2018, Lilja was involved in a car accident in Torrevieja, Spain while on a cycling training session. She was riding downhill at 40 mph and collided with a car that was on the wrong side of the road, the driver of the vehicle was convicted of drink driving when he was given a blood test. Lilja spent a few days in hospital after breaking two bones in her left leg. She was unable to train fully for three months.
