= Lilly Wigg =

English botanist (1749–1828)

Lilly Wigg (25 December 1749 – 28 March 1828) was an English botanist.

== Life ==
Wigg was born in Smallburgh, Norfolk, on 25 December 1749, the son of a shoemaker. He received a good village education, and was brought up to his father's trade, but moved to Great Yarmouth before he was twenty, where until 1801 he kept a small school in Fighting-cock Row. He acquired some knowledge of Latin, Greek, and French, was a skilled arithmetician, and wrote a beautifully neat copperplate hand. Through his love of botany and skill as a collector he became acquainted with Dr John Aikin, Thomas Jenkinson Woodward, Sir James Edward Smith and Dawson Turner. He was particularly interested in the study of seaweed, of which he created a collection from examples found on the beach.

In 1801 Turner engaged him as a clerk in Gurneys & Turner's bank at Yarmouth, a position which he occupied for the rest of his life. For nearly twenty years Wigg was collecting material for a history of edible plants, some of which, in manuscript, has subsequently been kept in the botanical department of the British Museum, now housed with all of the former BM botany library in the Natural History Museum. Another manuscript Flora Cibaria, consisting of extracts from books of travel, has been kept at Kew Gardens. Wigg also studied the birds and fishes of the Norfolk coast.

He was elected an associate of the Linnean Society of London as early as 1790. James Edward Smith acknowledged contributions from him to English Botany (1790–1814), styling him "a most ingenious and accurate observer … eminently skilful in detecting, as well as in preserving, specimens of marine algae". He also contributed to William Withering's Botanical Arrangement (1787–1792). Dawson Turner named after him Fucus (later Naccaria) Wigghii.

Wigg died in Great Yarmouth on 28 March 1828.
