= Kim Lilja =

Swedish ice hockey player

- Born: January 6, 1994 (age 31) Luleå, Sweden
- Height: 6 ft 3 in (191 cm)
- Weight: 187 lb (85 kg; 13 st 5 lb)
- Position: Left wing
- Shoots: Left
- SHL team: Luleå HF
- NHL draft: Undrafted
- Playing career: 2014–present

Kim Lilja (born January 6, 1994) is a Swedish ice hockey player. He is currently playing with Luleå HF of the Swedish Hockey League (SHL).

Lilja made his Swedish Hockey League debut playing with Luleå HF during the 2013–14 season.
