= Rita Vorperian =

Syrian-born American journalist and writer (1937/1938–2026)

- Ռիթա Որբերեան
- Born: 1937 or 1938; Aleppo, Syria
- Died: October 14, 2026 (aged 88)
- Citizenship: American
- Education: Karen Yeppe Armenian High School; UCLA
- Occupations: Journalist, Writer, Translator, and Researcher
- Title: Executive Director of the Armenian Relief Society
- Term: 1998 to 2005
- Mother: Lily Vorperian
- Awards: Mesrob Mashtots Medal (2011); Woman of the Year award of the 27th Congressional district (2002)

Rita Vorperian (Armenian: Ռիթա Որբերեան; 1937 or 1938 – October 14, 2026) was a Syrian-born American journalist, writer, translator and researcher. She served as teaching fellow and lecturer in Western Armenian at UCLA. Vorperian was the executive director of the Armenian Relief Society in the Western United States from 1998 to 2005 and later the senior administrator.

== Life and work ==
Of Armenian descent, Rita Vorperian was born in Aleppo, Syria, to Lily Vorperian, and graduated from the local Karen Yeppe Armenian High School. She continued her studies at the St. Joseph University in Beirut where she studied Armenology. After moving to the United States, Vorperian enrolled and graduated UCLA, where she received Bachelor of Arts degree in Near Eastern Studies, Master's degree in Near Eastern Languages and Cultures, and a Doctoral Degree in the field of Armenian literature and literary criticism. Her dissertation is titled A Feminist Reading of Krikor Zohrab. She had a strong interest in feminist topics, about which she made many presentations and contributed articles in Armenian publications in the United States and abroad. She was a senior lecturer at UCLA from 1983 to 2000.

Vorperian was an active journalist and submitted to many Armenian newspapers such as Aztag in Beirut, Azat Or in Greece, Asbarez in Los Angeles, Artsakank in Cyprus, and Hairenik in Watertown, Massachusetts. She also contributed to Pakine in Beirut with literary works.

She was one of the moderators for the University of California, Los Angeles World Conference in Contemporary Armenian Literature on April 7–8, 2011.

Vorperian spoke seven languages including Armenian, French, Arabic, Turkish, English, Spanish and Russian. She was a translator of numerous Armenian books such as Javakhk: A World That Cares by Jennifer Salmassian.

She was also one of the founding members of the Western United States branch of the Armenian Hamazkayin Cultural Organization.

Vorperian died on October 14, 2026, at the age of 88.

== Recognition ==
On March 25, 2011, she was awarded the Mesrob Mashtots Medal, the highest award for culture in Armenia, from the Archbishop of the Western Prelate of the Armenian church on behalf of Aram I, Catholicos of the Holy See of Cilicia for her literary accomplishments and dedication to the Armenian community.

On March 20, 2002 during the second session of the 107th Congress of the House of Representatives, Representative Adam Schiff awarded Rita Vorperian the Woman of the Year award of the 27th Congressional district for her accomplishments as a humanitarian and advocate for women's rights.

Business Life magazine named her a "Woman of Achievement".
