= Lilly Marks =

American business person

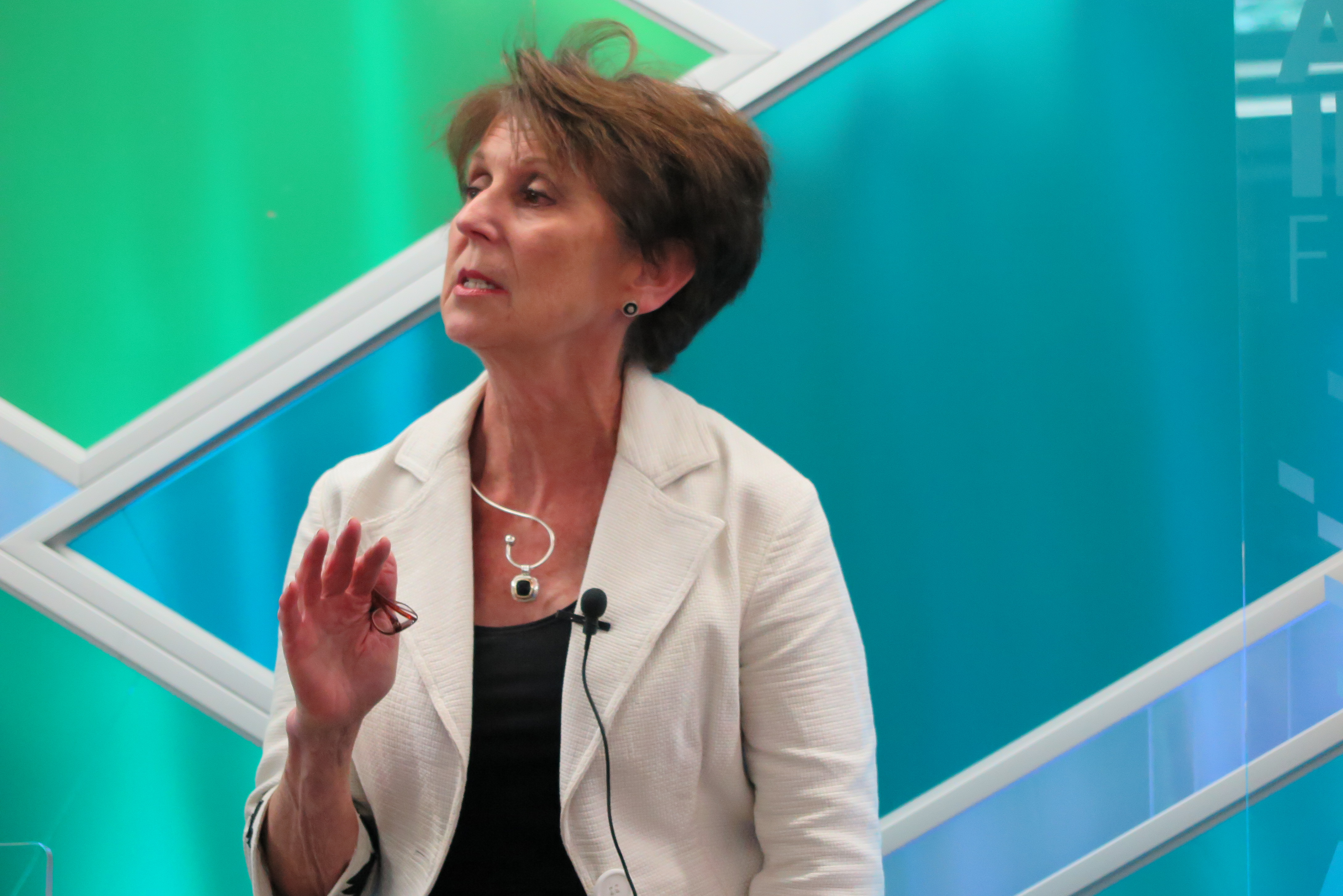

Head of Anschutz Medical Campus
- Incumbent
- Assumed office May 2010

Personal details
- Profession: health administration

Lilly Marks is an executive at the Anschutz Medical Campus. She has expertise in medical finance. Marks serves on the board of the Federal Reserve Bank of Kansas City Denver Branch.
