= Tigerlily (given name) =

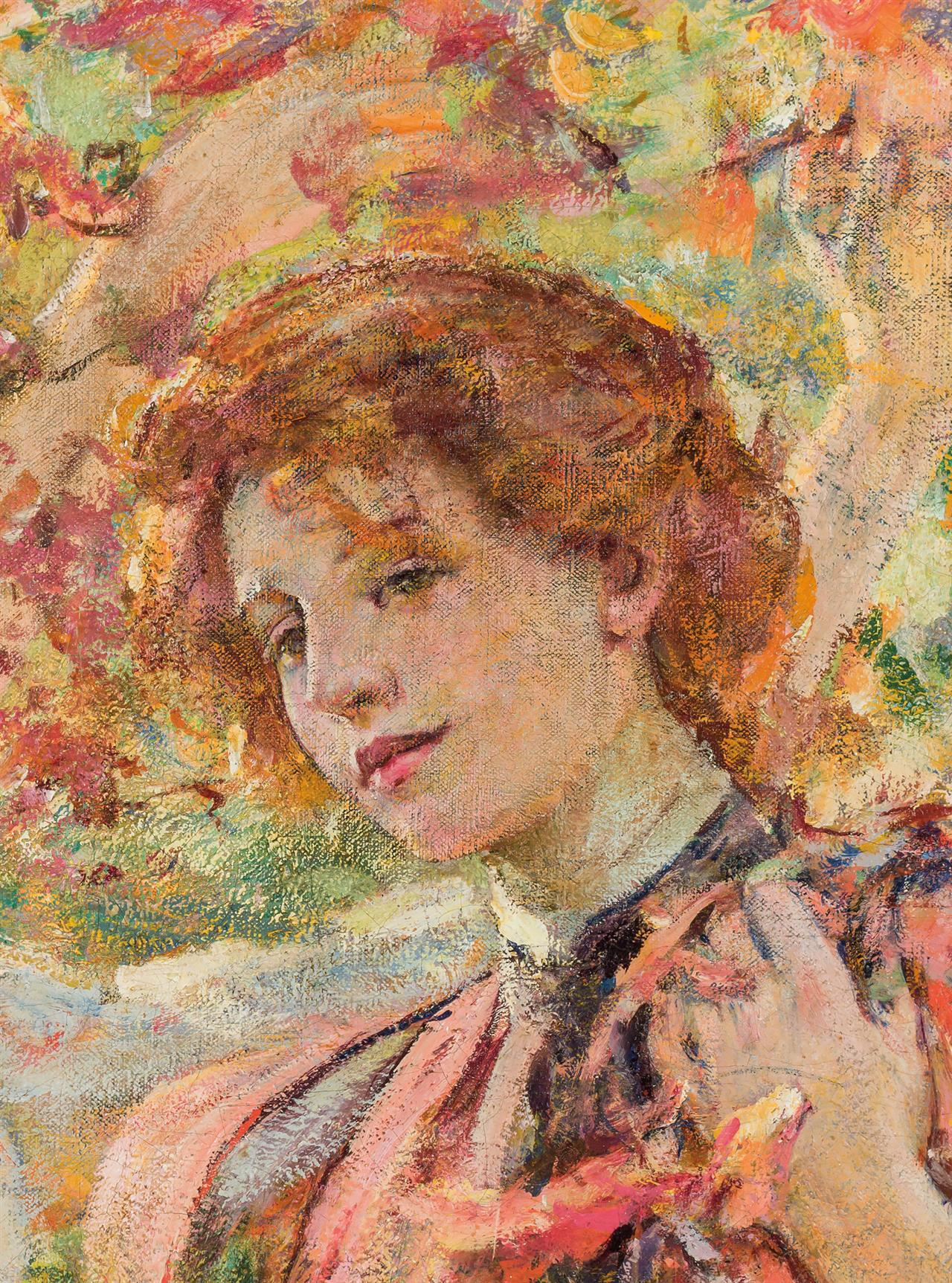
- Tiger Lily by Robert Lewis Reid.
- Gender: Feminine
- Language: English

Origin
- Meaning: English botanical name taken from the name of the flower.

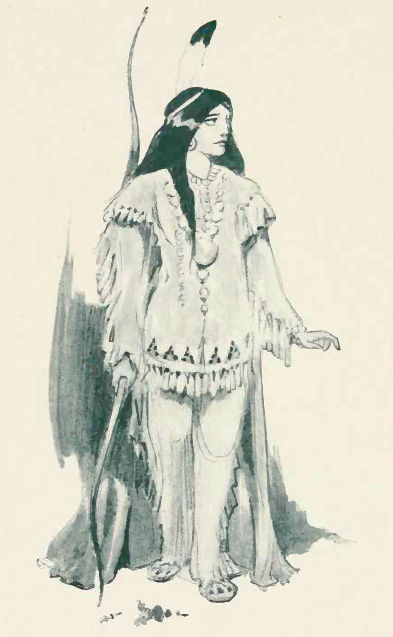
Tiger Lily is a character in J. M. Barrie's 1904 play Peter Pan, or The Boy Who Wouldn't Grow Up, his 1911 novel Peter and Wendy, and their various adaptations.

Tigerlily or Tiger Lily is an English feminine given name used in reference to the flower known as the tiger lily due to its coloration that resembles a tiger. (Note: It is a flower name also used in other languages such as the Mandarin Chinese name Xuān (萱) from xuān cǎo (萱草). The flower is said to be associated with motherhood in Chinese culture.) It was the name of a character in J. M. Barrie's 1904 play Peter Pan, or The Boy Who Wouldn't Grow Up, his 1911 novel Peter and Wendy, and their various adaptations. More attention was drawn to the name after its use by Michael Hutchence and Paula Yates for their daughter in 1996. More recently, the name caused comment when American Tigerlily Taylor Abdelfattah appeared on the American reality television series 90 Day Fiancé: Before the 90 Days in 2024. Abdelfattah said her young sons chose her name due to their liking for the character of Tiger Lily in the 1953 The Walt Disney Company film based on Barrie's Peter Pan. Abdelfattah was born Mariko Moss but later legally changed her first name to Tigerlily. It is a name with an image of bold and unconventional beauty, bordering on the outlandish, in Western countries. It is considered a "guilty pleasure" name by some.

== Usage ==
The name has been in occasional use in English-speaking countries since at least the 1990s but has never been ranked among the most popular names for newborn girls. There were 17 newborn American girls who received the name in 2020, 11 in 2021, 9 in 2022, 12 in 2023, 14 in 2024, and 14 in 2025. Three newborn girls were named Tigerlily in Northern Ireland in 2022.

== Women ==
- Tigerlily Taylor Abdelfattah (born Mariko Leigh Moss in c. 1982), American reality television show personality
- Heavenly Hiraani Tiger Lily Hutchence Geldof (born 1996), British and Australian singer-songwriter, daughter of the Australian singer-songwriter from INXS, Michael Hutchence, and British TV presenter Paula Yates, and adoptive daughter of Irish singer-songwriter and activist Bob Geldof.
- Tigerlily Taylor (born 1994), British model, daughter of Queen drummer Roger Taylor

== Stage name ==
- Tigerlily (DJ), stage name of Dara Kristen Hayes, an Australian DJ and record producer

== Pen name ==
- Pen name of Lillie Devereux Blake (1833–1913), American woman suffragist, reformer, and writer

== Fictional characters ==
- Tiger Lily (Peter Pan), a character in J.M. Barrie's Peter Pan
- Dr. Berenice “Tigerlily” Jones, a mad scientist character in the webcomic Skin Horse
- Tiger Lily White, the stage name of burlesque performer Bubbles in the 1940 American comedy-drama film Dance, Girl, Dance

== See also ==
- Tigirlily Gold, stage name of American country music duo Krista and Kendra Slaubaugh
