= Lily Ann Granderson =

American slave

Lily Ann Granderson born in 1816 as a slave in Petersburg, Kentucky as a slave. , Lily also was known as Milia Granderson, her birth name was Lily Ann Granson. She received the name Milia Granderson after she was sold into slavery. Although Lily faced many issues due to being an African American woman she persevered and became an educator. She created a space for other African American to also learn. Known as an American education/ a pioneering educator who taught other enslaved people how to read and influenced the founding of Jackson State University.

== Education and Literacy Development ==
For enslaved African Americans to acquire knowledge and take advantage of any opportunity, literacy was an essential tool. The role played by Lilly Ann Granderson as an educator demonstrated that education could be imparted to the slaves despite the limitations to learning. She educated other slaves on how to read and write. The teachings of Granderson turned out to be one of the significant ways of resistance to the oppression that was imposed upon African slaves. Granderson conducted classes for groups of children during the nights, passing to them her ability to read and write gained while being a slave. Thus, students were capable of spreading knowledge among other members of their community. Moreover, some of them managed to use their ability to write in order to forge travel papers for escaping from the slavery regime.

She chose to conduct her private lessons from 11 pm to 2 am. By doing this she was able to avoid being detected when teaching many slaves. She made sure that the doors and windows of the school were locked during her lessons and kept the number of her students at only twelve. Her main goal for doing this was to ensure that her lessons remained secret. Her influence was not only confined to the classroom she also taught skills that could be used in order to survive. Some of her students used their reading and writing skills to write travel passes in an attempt to free themselves from slavery. In addition to being an educator for students, her knowledge gave slaves knowledge which were denied to them elsewhere.

== Family Background ==
Lily Ann Granderson's grandmother was a free woman of Native American descent. After she died, Granderson's mother was sold into slavery at three years of age. Little is known about Granderson's father, except that he was a white man from one of the First Families of Virginia (FFV). Later, after she had given birth to Granderson, her mother moved to Kentucky where Granderson was enslaved doing domestic work. Granderson and the master's family became close, and the master's children even taught her how to read and write, a common method used by enslaved people to gain literacy.

When her master died, Granderson was shipped down to Mississippi where she was sold to another enslaver. On this plantation, Granderson worked in the fields, causing her to fall ill. She requested to be removed from the field and placed somewhere where the work would not put a strain on her health. The slave master granted her permission to work in the kitchen at his home. In this position, Granderson was required to make a trip into town from the plantation every day, as the slave master's home was not located directly on the plantation but in town. It was during this time that Granderson opened up her school for enslaved peoples.

== Contributions and legacy ==
Granderson used her trips into town to start her school for slaves. It was against the law in Mississippi to educate slaves out of fear of rebels and runaways. To get around this law, Granderson held classes late at night, when enslaved children could sneak out to attend class. Class size was limited to twelve children at a time. After the children had learned how to read and write, they "graduated," making room for twelve more children. Granderson operated this class for about seven years without being discovered.

Word eventually got out about this late-night class for slaves, but there was not a penalty for Granderson's actions. Although there was a law against the education of slaves, there was a loophole in this Mississippi law that applied to Granderson's case. While it was against Mississippi law for white people and free slaves to educate another slave, the law did not forbid enslaved people from educating other enslaved people. As a result of this, Granderson recovered from this setback and opened a Sabbath school in addition to her late-night school. Through her efforts, hundreds of students became literate and were able to use their literacy to acquire freedom.

She is also accredited with heavily influencing the creation of what is today Jackson State University (formerly known as Natchez Seminary). At 54 years of age, she became one of the first African Americans to open an account at the Freedman's Bank.

== Personal life ==
Granderson was Married to a man name Oliver Granderson, this is where she got her last name Granderson from.
