= Lily Vorperian =

Syrian-born Armenian-American embroiderer (1918–2008)

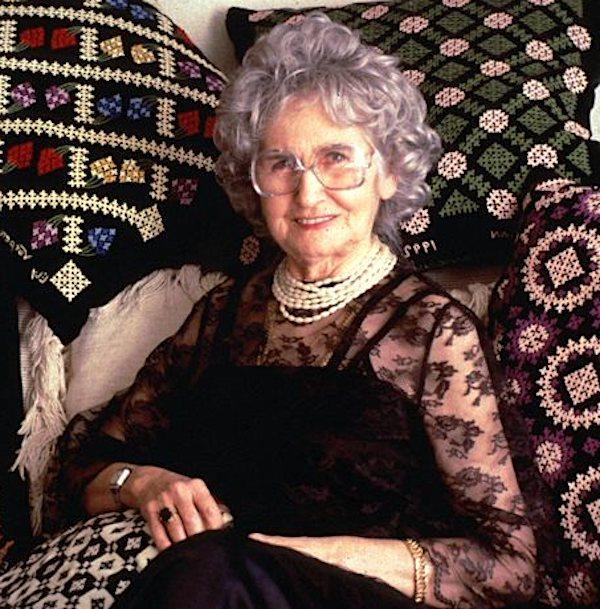
- Vorperian in 1994
- Born: Lily Kambourian; 1918; Aleppo, Syria
- Died: 2008 (aged 89–90); Glendale, California, U.S.
- Awards: National Heritage Fellowship (1994)

Lily Vorperian (née Kambourian; 1918–2008) was a Syrian-American embroiderer known for her work in Marash-style embroidery, for which she was given a National Heritage Fellowship by the National Endowment for the Arts in the 1990s.

== Embroidery ==
Vorperian first learnt embroidery when she was twelve from older women in the Armenian refugee community either who worked at the textile factory her parents ran in Syria or came to her house to receive aid distributed from her parents' home. They taught her eighteen different styles of regional embroidery, but Kambourian took to the Marash style "because it was the hardest". She carried on embroidering in her adult life and after her move to the United States. In 1986, took part in a folk arts program in Los Angeles and she was given a National Heritage Fellowship by the National Endowment for the Arts in 1994.

Her work included traditional Armenian designs such as khachkars flowers, geometric designs, the Armenian alphabet, and lines from Armenian poetry. A re-occurring theme of her later pieces was the Armenian genocide and people. She embroidered for seven to eight hours each day, with the remaining hours going towards planning new designs. A 1995 review of Vorperian's embroidery in The Los Angeles Times noted the complexity of her work and said that to call her an embroiderer was akin to "calling Coco Chanel a dressmaker". She refused to sell her designs, preferring instead to keep the majority of her work and occasionally loan individual pieces to museums, though in 1990 she embroidered a copy of the logo of the Armenian Relief Society for the organization to display.

In 1995, Vorperian's art was put on display alongside two other Armenian artists at the Fresno Metropolitan Museum of Art and Science. The exhibit was called "In Silver and Threads: Patterns of Armenian Tradition" and was sponsored by the National Endowment for the Arts, the Armenian National Committee of America, and the Armenian Studies program at California State University.

In 2022, her son, Hratch Vorperian, published a book dedicated to her embroidery.

== Personal life and death ==
Born Lily Kambourian in Aleppo, Syria, she was the youngest of three children in an Armenian family from Marash. Her mother, Zekia, had spent time in Germany and worked as a translator for the German military in Turkey, and her father, Haroutioun Kambourian, was a textile merchant. They survived the Armenian genocide, fleeing Turkey for Syria a few years before their youngest daughter's birth. Kambourian grew up in an Armenian refugee community in Aleppo. She married a local businessman, Haroutioun Vorperian, in 1937. The couple had four children, including Rita Vorperian. Haroutioun died in 1953, and Lily Vorperian was forced to sell her belongings to look after their children.

Vorperian moved to Beirut in 1964, and was forced to move to the United States in 1978 due to the Lebanese Civil War. She eventually settled in Glendale, California.

Vorperian died in Glendale, California in 2008.
