= John Lillie (politician) =

American politician

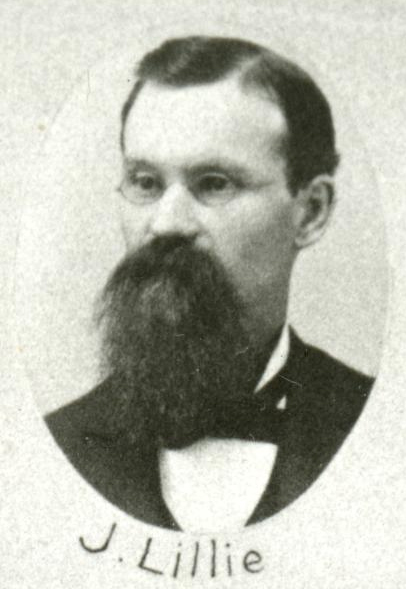
- Lillie in 1895

Member of the Washington House of Representatives for the 31st district
- In office 1895–1897

Personal details
- Born: September 12, 1847 Dumfriesshire, Scotland
- Died: May 13, 1921 (aged 73) Port Townsend, Washington, United States
- Party: Republican

John Lillie (September 12, 1847 – May 13, 1921) was an American politician in the Washington state. He served in the Washington House of Representatives from 1895 to 1897.
