= Lilith (disambiguation) =

Lilith is a character in Jewish mythology.

Lilith, Lillith, or Lilit may also refer to:

== Fictional characters ==
=== In anime ===
- Lilith (Neon Genesis Evangelion), an angel character
- Lilith, a small fairy in the Rosario + Vampire manga and anime series
- Lilith (Darkstalkers), a character in Darkstalkers
- Lilith Aileron, in Tales of Destiny
- Lilith Asami, in Trinity Seven

=== In film and television ===
- Lilith (Supernatural), a fictional demon in Supernatural
- Lilith, a villain in the Doctor Who episode "The Shakespeare Code"
- Lilith, a character in Tales from the Crypt Presents: Bordello of Blood
- Lilith, the host of the TV series Femme Fatales
- Lilith, the vampire Goddess in season five of True Blood
- Lilith, a demon referred to as the mother of all demons who is the main villain in season 3 of Shadowhunters
- Lilith, also known as Madam Satan, in Chilling Adventures of Sabrina (2018–2020)
- Lilith, a demon in episode 4 of season 5 of Lucifer
- Lilith Clawthorne, a character from the animated fantasy series The Owl House
- Lilith Hughes, mother of Cassie Hughes in the Sky One series Hex
- Lilith Sternin, on Cheers and Frasier
- Lillith Sullivan, main character in the film Case 39
- Dark Lilith, a disguise in Scooby-Doo! Mystery Incorporated

=== In games ===
- Lilith (World of Darkness), mother of all demons in the World of Darkness series of games
- Lilith (Dungeons & Dragons), a consort she-devil in Dungeons & Dragons
- Lilith, aka Lil, the protagonist of Lil' Guardsman
- Lilith, a succubus in Darkstalkers
- Lilith, a Siren in the Borderlands series
- Lilith, a character in Darksiders II
- Lilith, a character in Devil May Cry
- Lilith, a character in The Secret World
- Lilith, the "Mother of Monsters," a playable master in Malifaux
- Lilith, a character in The Binding of Isaac: Afterbirth
- Lilith, a character from Fire Emblem Fates
- Lilith, antagonist of Amazing Princess Sarah
- Lilith (Diablo), the main antagonist of Diablo IV

=== In literature ===
- Lilith (Marvel Comics), two characters in the Marvel Comics universe
- Lilith (DC Comics), a supervillain in the DC Comics universe
- Lilith, a demon in the City of Fallen Angels
- Lilith, the title character in the Lilith's Brood science-fiction trilogy by Octavia E. Butler
- Lilith, a villain in the Nightside series by S. Green
- Lilith, a character in the play She Kills Monsters by Qui Nguyen
- Lilith, a character in Sinfest
- Lilith, a character in Trinity Blood
- Lilith, a character in Yami to Bōshi to Hon no Tabibito
- Lilith Clay, a superheroine in the DC Comics universe
- Lilith Clay, also known as Judy, from the Girl Genius comic/webcomic
- Dr. Lilith Ritter, a character in Nightmare Alley
- Lilith Weatherwax, a character in Witches Abroad

== Music ==
- Lilith (album), a 2017 album by Butcher Babies
- Lilith (opera), a 2001 opera by Deborah Drattell
- "Lilith", a song by Chelsea Grin from Evolve
- "Lilith", a song by Halsey from If I Can't Have Love, I Want Power
- "Lilith", a song by Therion from Les Fleurs du Mal
- "Lilith/Eve", a song by Machines of Loving Grace from Concentration
- Lilith, a dark ambient music project of Scott Gibbons
- "Lilith", a song by Varien
- "Lilith", a song by Bea Duarte from Mulheres Que Correm

== People with the given name ==
- Lilith (given name), the given name, including a list of people with this name
- Lilit (given name), the given name, including a list of people with this name

== Publications ==
- Lilith (magazine), a Jewish feminist magazine
- Lilith (novel), an 1895 gothic novel by George MacDonald

== Other uses ==
- 1181 Lilith, an asteroid
- Lilith (computer), a computer designed in the late 1970s by Niklaus Wirth at ETH Zürich
- Lilith (film), a 1964 film set in an asylum based on a novel by the same name by J. R. Salamanca
- Lilith (fictitious moon), an invisible moon from astrology
- Lilith (Lurianic Kabbalah), characters called Lilith in the teachings of 16th century rabbi Isaac Luria
- Lilith (painting), an 1889 painting by John Collier
- Lilith (play), an acclaimed 1919 play by George Sterling

== See also ==
- Lady Lilith, a painting by Dante Rossetti
- Lilith in popular culture
- Lilith Fair, an annual concert tour from 1997 to 1999
- The Lilith Project, by David deFeis from the heavy metal band Virgin Steele
