= Varien discography =

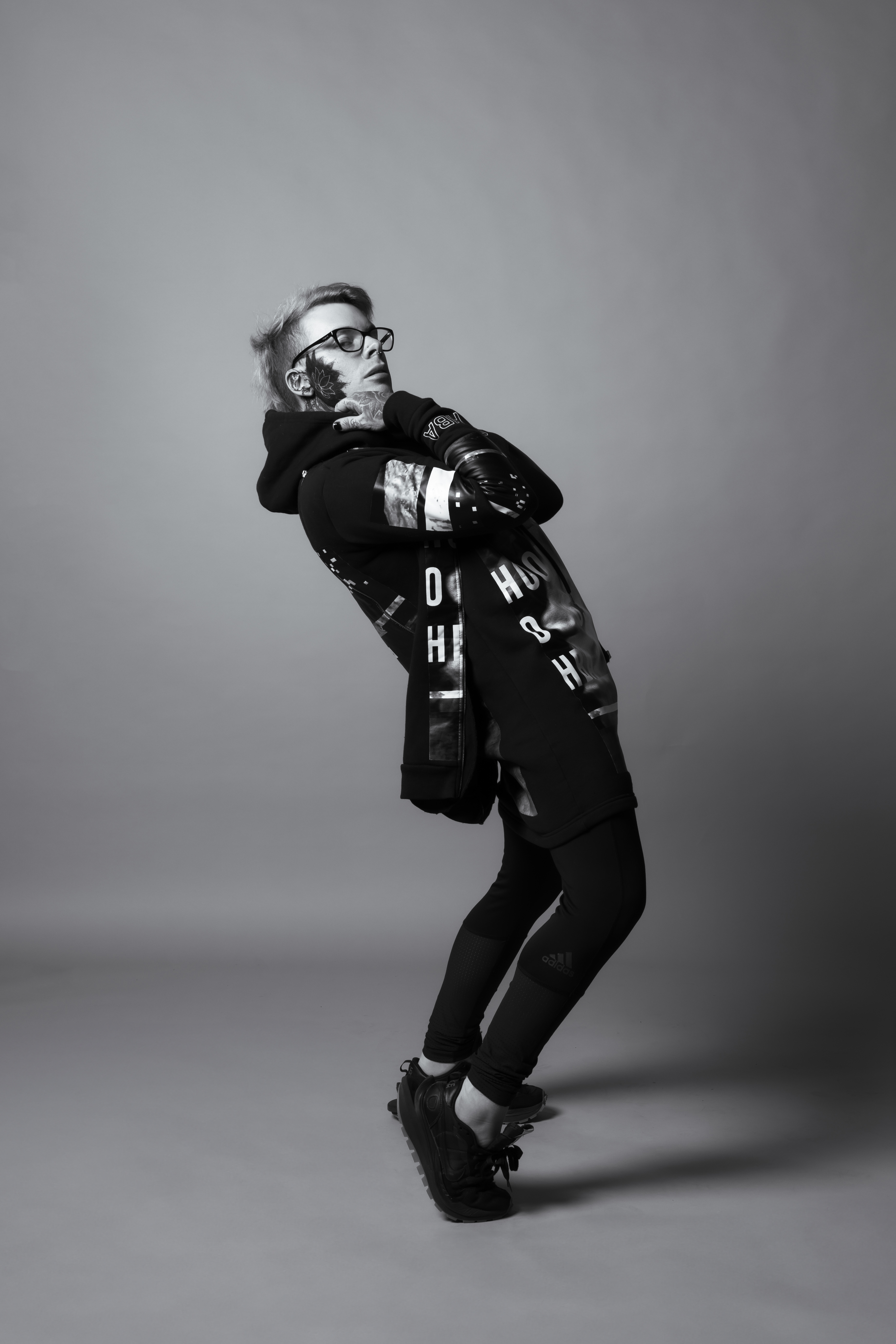
Varien in 2023

The discography of American composer, musician, singer, producer, and multi-instrumentalist Varien. Genres have been cited as industrial, metal, orchestral, neofolk, and ambient music. This includes material that has been credited under their stage names Chrono Rabbit, Halo Nova, Koinu, as well as their names Nick Kaelar and Nikki Kaelar.

== Discography ==
=== Studio albums ===
Title	Details
The Ancient & Arcane	Released: August 5, 2015; Label: Monstercat; Format: Digital
La Douleur Exquise Nick Kaelar	Released: September 29, 2017; Label: Subterra Records; Format: Digital
The Second Industrial Revolution	Released: December 6, 2019; Label: Self-released; Format: Digital
In the Realm of Hungry Ghosts	Released: June 8, 2023; Label: Self-released; Format: Digital

=== Extended plays ===
Title	Details
Pick Your Poison, Vol. 01	Released: February 6, 2013; Label: Subterra Records; Format: Digital
It's Showtime!, Vol. 01 as Chrono Rabbit	Released: February 6, 2013; Label: Subterra Records; Format: Digital
Pick Your Poison, Vol. 02	Released: January 23, 2014; Label: Subterra Records; Format: Digital
Mirai Sekai (with 7 Minutes Dead)	Released: September 1, 2014; Label: Monstercat; Format: Digital
My Prayers Have Become Ghosts	Released: October 31, 2016; Label: Monstercat; Format: Digital
Into Oblivion as Nick Kaelar	Released: December 6, 2016; Label: Subterra Records; Format: Digital
Death Asked a Question	Released: October 26, 2018; Label: Most Addictive Records; Format: Digital

=== Singles ===
==== As Varien ====
Title	Year	Album	Label
Cloak and Dagger	2011	Monstercat 003 – Momentum	Monstercat
Throne of Ravens	2011	Monstercat 005 – Evolution	Monstercat
"Skrillex Orchestral Suite"	2011	Bangarang	
Mirrors	2012	Monstercat 005 – Evolution	Monstercat
The Alchemist's Nightmare	2012	Monstercat 006 – Embrace	Monstercat
Seduction	2012	Monstercat 007 – Solace	Monstercat
Resurrection of the Dagger	2012	Monstercat 009 – Reunion	Monstercat
The Anthem (with Project 46 & Ephixa)	2012	Monstercat 009 – Reunion	Monstercat
Nights in Bangalore	2012	Non-album single	Play Me Records
Morphine	2012	Monstercat 011 – Revolution	Monstercat
Lilith	2012	Monstercat 012 – Aftermath	Monstercat
Nights in Bangalore Pt. 2	2013	Monstercat 012 – Aftermath	Monstercat
Toothless Hawkins (And His Robot Jazz Band) (with Raizhell)	2013	Monstercat 013 – Awakening	Monstercat
The Scarlet Dawn	2013	Monstercat 016 – Expedition	Monstercat
Memories of Melodies Past	2013	Monstercat – The Best of 2013	Monstercat
Metalworks	2013	Non-album single	FiXT/Position Music
Moonlight (with SirensCeol) [featuring Aloma Steele]	2014	Monstercat 017 – Ascension	Monstercat
Valkyrie (featuring Laura Brehm)	2014	Monstercat 018 – Frontier	Monstercat
Gunmetal Black	2014	Monstercat 018 – Frontier	Monstercat
Valkyrie II: Lacuna (featuring Cassandra Kay)	2014	Monstercat 019 – Endeavour	Monstercat
Mirai Sekai Pt. 3 – Aeon Metropolis	2014	Mirai Sekai, Monstercat 019 – Endeavour	Monstercat
Whispers in the Mist (featuring Aloma Steele)	2014	Monstercat 020 – Altitude	Monstercat
Aether and Light	2015	Monstercat 022 – Contact	Monstercat
Supercell (featuring Veela)	2015	The Ancient & Arcane, Monstercat 023 – Voyage	Monstercat
Hypnotique (featuring Charlotte Haining)	2015	The Ancient & Arcane, Monstercat 023 – Voyage	Monstercat
Beyond the Surface	2015	Non-album single	Self-released
Valkyrie III: Atonement (featuring Laura Brehm)	2015	Monstercat 024 – Vanguard	Monstercat
We Are the Lights (with Mr FijiWiji)	2015	Monstercat 025 – Threshold	Monstercat
Sacred Woods (featuring Skyelle)	2016	Monstercat 027 – Cataclysm	Monstercat
TEVA833	2016	My Prayers Have Become Ghosts, Monstercat 029 – Havoc	Monstercat
Catherine (with K?D)	2017	Non-album singles	Self-released
Wrath of God (with Teri Miko) [featuring Flowsik]	2017	Non-album singles	Spinnin' Records
Mutiny	2017	Non-album singles	Outerloop Records
Blood Hunter	2018	Non-album singles	Self-released
The Dark Harvest	2018	Non-album singles	Self-released
Of Foxes and Hounds	2018	Non-album singles	Self-released
Claws	2018	Non-album singles	Self-released
Monarch Butterfly	2018	Non-album singles	Self-released
Never Ending (with SWARM)	2018	Non-album singles	Self-released
Eventide (with Diskord)	2018	Non-album singles	Circus Records
Oh, Sparrow	2018	Non-album singles	Self-released
Death Asked a Question	2018	Death Asked a Question	Most Addictive Records
Born of Blood, Risen of Ash	2019	Non-album singles	Lowly Palace
Can You Feel My Heart (feat. Andrew Zink)	2019	Non-album singles	Self-released
Hush the Storms Away (feat. STRIX)	2019	Non-album singles	Self-released
A Pale White Horse	2019	Non-album singles	Self-released
One Shot, One Kill	2019	Non-album singles	Metanoia Music
"Phoenix"; LSDREAM & Varien	2019	Non-album singles	Wakaan

==== As Halo Nova ====
Title	Year	Album	Label
The Force	2011	Monstercat 001 – Launch Week	Monstercat
Triceracops	2011	Monstercat 002 – Early Stage	Monstercat
Totally Radical	2011	Monstercat 002 – Early Stage	Monstercat

==== As Koinu ====
Title	Year
Milkshakes and Chill	2016
Storm the Gates (with Sakuraburst)	2016
#SHIBESQUAD	2016
Gainax Bounce	2016
Tomodachi	2016
Kuroneko	2016

== Remixes ==
Title	Details
"Tokyo (Varien Remix)" (from Tokyo (The Remixes by Gareth Emery)	Released: March 5, 2012; Label: Armada Music; Format: Digital
"Louder Than Words (Varien Remix)" (from Space & Time EP by Celldweller)	Released: December 11, 2012; Label: FiXT; Format: Digital
"Wake/E-Bow" (Varien Remix) (from Cataclasm (The Remixes) by Crywolf)	Released: July 29, 2016; Label: Okami Records; Format: Digital

== Film, television, and video games ==
Kaelar's music has appeared in the following works:

Year	Title
2012	Intervention
2013	Breaking Amish: Los Angeles
2013	Pain & Gain
2013	The Tomorrow People
2013	The Challenge: Rivals II
2013	NASCAR Race Hub
2013	Runner Runner
2014	America's Next Top Model
2014	300: Rise of an Empire
2014	PlanetSide 2
2014	The Purge: Anarchy
2014	Face Off
2014	M.A.V.
2014	Monsters: Dark Continent
2014	Bones
2014	The Loft
2015	The Walking Dead
2015	Furious 7
2017	Injustice 2
2017	Doki Doki Literature Club!
2018	America's Got Talent
2018	The Return of Superman (TV series)
2019	Replicas
2021	Doki Doki Literature Club Plus! (Lead Composer)
2021	Heart of the Woods (Vocal Engineer)
2022	Sprawl (Lead Composer)
2023	Goddess of Victory: Nikke (Composer)
