= Return to Amish =

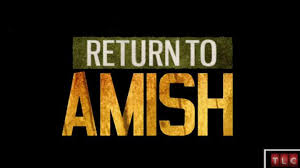
- Genre: Reality
- Country of origin: United States
- Original language: English
- No. of seasons: 7
- No. of episodes: 59

Production
- Running time: 42–90 minutes
- Production company: Hot Snakes Media

Original release
- Network: TLC
- Release: May 22, 2014 – May 16, 2023

Related
- Breaking Amish

Return to Amish is an American reality television series on the TLC television network that debuted May 22, 2014. It is a spinoff and continuation series to Breaking Amish which ran four seasons from 2012 to 2014. The series deal with the original cast members of Breaking Amish returning to their hometowns and trying to adjust to living in their Amish communities once again, but come across problems or make choices along the way that interfere with that goal and thus remain shunned for the time being.

== Production ==
On May 1, 2014, it was announced that Breaking Amish was spawning a spin-off, entitled Return to Amish following the Breaking Amish cast members of seasons one and two who all lived in Pennsylvania at the time of production, except for Kate, who resided in New York City. The two-hour premiere debuted on June 1, 2014, with the season airing seven episodes.

A second season of Return to Amish premiered on May 31, 2015. On June 14, 2016, the show was renewed for a third season with a premiere date of July 10, 2016. A trailer released by TLC revealed much of the original cast returning, including Mary and Sabrina, who appeared in seasons one, two and three, but was absent from the fourth. The fourth season was originally set to be Mary's last and it possibly being the final season altogether.

The show's fifth season premiered on November 18, 2018. Jeremiah, Mary, and Sabrina returned but not Abe and Rebecca. The returning three cast members were joined by several new cast members: Dawn, Shelly, Lowell, and Ada. Cast member Matt from the fourth season of Breaking Amish makes guest appearances this season. The season follows Jeremiah and his wife Carmela as they travel across country running their donut business with the help of Amish and Mennonite workers who are eager to break loose into the English world. Critics have claimed some of the episodes have scripted elements.

On November 14, 2022, it was announced that the seventh season would premiere on March 14, 2023.

== Cast ==
Cast	Community	Details	Seasons
Abe Schmucker	Ex-Amish	From Punxsutawney, Pennsylvania.	1-4
Jeremiah Raber	Ex-Amish	Adopted by an Amish family, grew up in Holmes County, Ohio.	1-7
Kate Stoltzfus	Ex-Amish	Daughter of a bishop, grew up in Lancaster, Pennsylvania, previously spent some time in Florida. Currently lives in New York City.	1-3
Rebecca Schmucker	Ex-Amish	From Punxsutawney, Pennsylvania.	1-4
Sabrina High	Ex-Mennonite	Adopted by a Mennonite family, born to Puerto Rican and Italian parents.	1-7
Mary Schmucker	Amish	From Punxsutawney, Pennsylvania.	1-5
Chester Schmucker	Amish	From Punxsutawney, Pennsylvania.	1-4
Katie Ann Schmucker	Amish	From Punxsutawney, Pennsylvania.	1-3
Andrew Schmucker	Ex-Amish	From Punxsutawney, Pennsylvania.	1-3
Chapel Peace Schmucker	"English"	From Punxsutawney, Pennsylvania.	1-3
Carmela Mendez Raber	English	From Vancouver, Washington Married to Jeremiah Raber. Escaped from Branhamism, had four children prior to marrying Jeremiah	3-7
Ada Byler	Amish	From Punxsutawney, Pennsylvania.	5-7
LaShell Yoder	ex-Amish	From Belleville, Pennsylvania. Adopted by a Mennonite family.	5
Dawn Martin	ex-Mennonite	From Mifflinburg, Pennsylvania.	5
Lowell Hoover	ex-Mennonite	From Bedford, Pennsylvania. Adopted by a Mennonite family.	5
Jethro Nolt	ex-Mennonite	Was on Breaking Amish, returns in season 6 as Sabrina's partner and father of two of her children	6
Maureen Byler	Amish	From Punxsutawney, Pennsylvania. Granddaughter of Ada Byler	6-7
Rosanna Miller	ex-Amish	From Punxsutawney, Pennsylvania.	6-7
Danny Byler	ex-Amish	From Punxsutawney, Pennsylvania.	6-7
Fanny Schmucker	Amish	From Punxsutawney, Pennsylvania. Rosanna Miller's cousin and Mary Schmucker's Niece.	7
Kenneth Detweiler	Amish	From Munfordville, Kentucky.	7
Johnnie Detweiler	Amish	From Punxsutawney, Pennsylvania.	7
Daniel Miller	Amish	From Hopkinton, Iowa.	7

== Episodes ==
=== Series overview ===
Season	Episodes	Originally released	
Season	Episodes	First released	Last released
1	9	May 22, 2014	July 20, 2014
2	8	May 31, 2015	July 19, 2015
3	8	July 10, 2016	August 28, 2016
4	6	April 30, 2017	May 4, 2017
5	8	November 18, 2018	January 13, 2019
6	10	March 22, 2021	June 24, 2021
7	10	March 14, 2023	May 16, 2023

=== Season 1 (2014) ===
No. overall	No. in season	Title	Original release date	U.S. viewers (millions)
1	1	"Return to Amish: Our Journey So Far"	May 22, 2014	N/A
We revisit the men and women of Breaking Amish reliving the journey Abe, Jeremiah, Rebecca, Kate, and Sabrina took when they decided to leave their homes and communities to follow their dreams.
2	2	"Home is where the beef is"	June 1, 2014	N/A
Abe and ex-Amish friends and family get back together at Mary's for Christmas where her husband Chester is in for a rude awakening. Andrew has a score to settle with Jeremiah, Rebecca and Sabrina are expecting big things, and a big opportunity awaits Kate in New York.
3	3	"Shunned & The City"	June 8, 2014	N/A
Mary takes an impromptu trip to New York City. Katie Ann tags along with Mary and Kate in the big apple where she talks to a New York guy. In Punxy Abe, Rebecca, Sabrina, and Jeremiah talk babies and shunning .... While Andrew and Chapel have an important appointment.
4	4	"I'm Amish, What Are You?"	June 14, 2014	N/A
Abe and Rebecca introduce their newborn baby to their family, but when Sabrina shows up her pregnancy takes a scary turn. Jeremiah takes on the Schmucker ladies, and Mary argues with Chester about the church, while Chapel gets some news.
5	5	"Six More Weeks of Winter"	June 22, 2014	N/A
Chapel gets heartbreaking news and must figure out a way to tell Andrew. Mary and Jeremiah showcase their business idea at the local Groundhog's Day Festival. Sabrina gets some questionable advice, while Kate stays focused on her career back in New York.
6	6	"Brother, Where Art Thou?"	June 29, 2014	N/A
A major decision is made in Andy and Chapel's relationship, but will Abe and Rebecca be there to support? Mary takes her mind off the family shunning by opening up a store with Jeremiah and the wait is over for Sabrina when her baby girl is born.
7	7	"Rebel Without a Clue"	July 6, 2014	N/A
Jeremiah makes an impactful decision regarding his life. Meanwhile Andy lets loose in an interesting way at his bachelor party, while Chapel goes wedding dress shopping. Later Mary and Chester unleash unexpected news.
8	8	"Second Chances"	July 13, 2014	N/A
In the season finale Andrew and Chapel prepare for their big day, but nothing runs smoothly. Rebecca gives some important advice, while Abe worries about the wedding activities. Jeremiah makes a final commitment and will Mary and Chester show up for the big day?
9	9	"The Shunning Truth"	July 20, 2014	N/A
The men and women of Return to Amish are together again for a revealing one-hour reunion special. Hosted by NBC's Michelle Beadle, we'll delve into the lives of each person and hear what they've been up to since the show ended. Note: This is Sabrina's final episode until Season 3.

=== Season 2 (2015) ===
Sabrina High does not return full-time but does make guest appearances. Mary Schmucker has stated this will be her final season. Rebecca Schmucker has stated it will also be the final season for her and Abe.

No. overall	No. in season	Title	Original release date	U.S. viewers (millions)
10	1	"Broken Family"	May 31, 2015	N/A
Mary's shunning by the Amish church continues, due to attending Andrew's wedding. Abe and Rebecca don't feel connected to the Amish community. Jeremiah (who is still living the Amish lifestyle) and Katie Ann are trying to live by the rules, but find sticking to their Amish roots to be difficult. In NYC Kate decides to get a nose job to fix her deviated septum from her childhood injury. Mary begins searching for a location for a Bed & Breakfast.
11	2	"Under Arrest"	June 7, 2015	N/A
12	3	"A Real Emergency"	June 14, 2015	N/A
13	4	"Mother Schmucker's B&B"	June 21, 2015	N/A
14	5	"Other Side of the Fence"	June 28, 2015	N/A
15	6	"A Secret"	July 5, 2015	N/A
16	7	"Ultimatum"	July 12, 2015	N/A
17	8	"Big Decisions"	July 19, 2015	N/A

=== Season 3 (2016) ===
No. overall	No. in season	Title	Original release date	U.S. viewers (millions)
18	1	"Judgment Day"	July 10, 2016	N/A
Mary is banished by the church. She realizes that she must leave Punxsy but Chester decides to remain. The family finds her a house in Lancaster. Kate gets a job as a fashion designer intern in New York with Cynthia Rowley.
19	2	"Banished"	July 17, 2016	N/A
The family travels to New York to visit Kate for three weeks. Mary's daughter Esther arrives in New York as well.
20	3	"Dental Dilemma"	July 24, 2016	N/A
Abe requires expensive dental treatment and Rebecca goes to work to help pay for it. Kate is hampered by her lack of computer skills. Esther considers leaving the church.
21	4	"You Lie!"	July 31, 2016	N/A
Sabrina speaks to a class at NYU about her experiences growing up Mennonite. Esther begins to try out some of the English ways. Mary enjoys a night on the town.
22	5	"Breaking Dad"	August 7, 2016	N/A
Jeremiah's kids visit him in New York. Mary hopes to settle the family arguments. Abe is not happy about Rebecca working, even though it is to help him. Sabrina has not been on a date in years, so Jeremiah asks her out.
23	6	"Rebels Without a Claus"	August 14, 2016	N/A
The family leaves New York and arrives back in Lancaster in time for Old Christmas Day. Jeremiah accuses Kate of thinking she is better than the rest of them, which offends her.
24	7	"The Announcement"	August 21, 2016	N/A
Mary tries to find a new church. Sabrina wins back her parental rights. Kate is flown to LA for a fashion event. Abe decides to get his teeth pulled. Jeremiah announces that he is engaged to Carmela. Esther is hurt in a car accident.
25	8	"License to Wed"	August 28, 2016	N/A
In this 2-hour episode, Mary announces that she has decided to return to Punxsy to be with Chester, even though the Amish community may not accept her. Kate has a hard time at the fashion show but does a great job. Carmela gets a chance to meet the family and they treat her to an Amish dinner. Carmela reveals that she grew up in a cult and all compare her experience to their Amish and Mennonite upbringing. Kate does not come to the wedding. Despite some bumps, the wedding takes place successfully. In the epilogue, Jeremiah and Carmela are happy in their marriage. Abe is still doing long haul trucking, leaving Rebecca with the kids. Mary moved back to Punxsy with Chester, but is still banished by the church. Kate is doing well in New York and has still not spoken with Jeremiah. Sabrina is still clean and sober and her daughter has been returned to her. Esther left the Amish church and ran off to Ohio with her boyfriend. Two months after the wedding, Sabrina reveals that she is pregnant.

=== Season 4 (2017) ===
- For this season, the episodes are all two hours long (including commercials).

No. overall	No. in season	Title	Original release date	U.S. viewers (millions)
26	1	"Mary With Children"	April 30, 2017	N/A
Sabrina's daughter has been taken away again, and she wants to have a home birth. Rebecca decides to get a GED but finds that she has a lot of work to do, especially in math and science. Jeremiah sinks all of his money into a piece of land in Florida, but a man informs him that he cannot build on it because it is a swamp.
27	2	"I Got You Abe"	May 7, 2017	N/A
Rebecca and Abe go in for counseling, and later Mary is included in the sessions. Mary buys a Trans Am, learns to drive and leaves for Florida with Abe to visit Jeremiah. Jeremiah learns that the neighbors lied to him so they could maintain their privacy and he can build after all.
28	3	"Fun in the Shun"	May 14, 2017	N/A
Abe helps Jeremiah build his deck, then all go to Sarasota for some rest and relaxation. Mary tries out as many "English" activities as she can. Andrew considers telling Chester what Mary is up to but thinks better of it. Meanwhile, Sabrina worries about what will become of her baby. Rebecca works on her GED prep and then decides to fly to Sarasota.
29	4	"From Here to Maternity"	May 21, 2017	N/A
Rebecca and Carmela resolve their differences. Jeremiah and Carmela do tests to see if they can conceive via IVF. Back in Pennsylvania, Mary organizes a baby shower for Sabrina but Rebecca and Abe refuse to attend. Sabrina wants to sign over guardianship of her baby to her Mennonite parents. However, the baby is born four weeks early before the paperwork is ready and the state moves to take custody. Rebecca prepares to take her GED exam.
30	5	"Chasing Raber"	May 28, 2017	N/A
Jeremiah and Carmela begin their IVF process. Jeremiah focuses on the house instead of Carmela, which leads to arguments. Carmela packs up her kids and drives to Washington. Jeremiah flies there to meet her and she says she wants marriage counseling. Meanwhile, Rebecca takes her GED exam and fails it, but surprisingly Abe is supportive. Sabrina signs over her parental rights. Jeremiah and Carmela see a counselor and get into an argument while there, which leads the counselor to question whether they should stay together.
31	6	"Amish Pair-O-Dice"	June 4, 2017	N/A
Mary offers to take Jeremiah and Carmela to Las Vegas for the honeymoon they never had. On the morning of the flight Mary breaks her ankle so Abe accompanies them as well. While there Jeremiah asks Carmela to renew their vows and she accepts, though she is skeptical that it will fix their relationship problems. Eventually Rebecca and Sabrina join them and all reconcile and enjoy the vow ceremony. In the epilogue, Sabrina continues to have substance abuse problems. She was arrested on a probation violation. She hopes to get her parental rights back. Rebecca is continuing to work on her GED and then plans to attend college. Abe gave up his long distance truck driving job and now stays home with Rebecca and the children. Word of Mary's driving and trip to Las Vegas got back to Punxsy, and now Chester is in danger of being banished from the church. Jeremiah and Carmela separated after an incident that happened after filming ended, and they hope to reconcile.

=== Season 5 (2018–19) ===
- For this season, the episodes return to the hour-long format (including commercials) of the first five seasons with the exception of the season premiere and the sixth, seventh and eighth episodes, which run two hours like the previous season episodes.

No. overall	No. in season	Title	Original release date	U.S. viewers (millions)
32	1	"Leaving Everything Behind"	November 18, 2018	N/A
Mary decides to try to return to the Amish church to reduce the pressure on Chester and to be able to participate in her Amish daughter Katie Ann's wedding. This means she must cut ties with ex-Amish Jeremiah. Jeremiah and Carmela start an Amish donut business at fairs but need help and partner with Ada. Ada insists that they use only Amish or Mennonite staff. Dawn, Shelly and Lowell quietly leave the church and their families and join the business. Sabrina hears of this and demands a job as well.
33	2	"Donut Season"	November 25, 2018	N/A
Jeremiah wants to introduce his new recruits to the English world gradually, so he flies them to Sarasota. Jeremiah and Carmela stay at the house while Dawn, Shelly and Lowell go to a bar. Ada arrives the next morning and discovers that Shelly did not return that night. Meanwhile, Sabrina learns that her father has just died and goes to Wilmington DE for the funeral. Sabrina was told in the past that her mother had committed suicide because of her, which left Sabrina with huge guilt and possibly led to her drug problems. At the funeral she hears that none of that was true.
34	3	"Sabrina's Surprise"	December 2, 2018	N/A
Shelly had called her boyfriend Matt to tell him that she was uncomfortable working with her ex Lowell. Matt arrived in Sarasota to give her an opportunity to leave with him, but she decided to stay and rejoined the others at the house. Dawn, Shelly and Lowell shop for bathing suits and hit the beach. Mary sells all of her "English" items and gives up her drivers license, then approaches the Bishop to ask for reinstatement. Sabrina arrives at the house and again asks for a job, and Ada hires her over Jeremiah's reservations. Lowell's girlfriend Lisa informs him that she is pregnant. As Lowell contemplates fatherhood, Jeremiah asks him if perhaps the baby is not his? This sets off a huge fight all through the house.
35	4	"Jeremiah's Dark Past"	December 9, 2018	N/A
The fight is resolved but all wonder what kind of boss Jeremiah will be. They set off for their first donut sale in New Orleans. Jeremiah instructs Dawn, Shelly and Lowell to be home before dark but they ignore him and explore the French Quarter. Mary attends a church service with her family and it goes well although she cannot eat with the congregation afterwards because she is shunned. Jeremiah and company eat beignets at Cafe du Monde and say they are not really donuts. Shelly contacts her birth mother via phone and is told a different story of why she was adopted, then wonders whom to believe. Afterwards several describe the feelings of being adopted. Dawn is troubled because her husband keeps contacting her, and Ada gives her some words of advice. When it comes time to set up the donut stand, the equipment doesn't work and Sabrina is a no-show.
35	5	"Going Full English"	December 23, 2018	N/A
Ada arrives and plugs in the equipment and they start selling donuts. The Bishop informs Mary that people are accusing her of trying to bribe her way back into the church by giving away Tupperware. Mary confronts her neighbor over this. Her neighbor thinks that Mary will just go back to being English as soon as the wedding is over, which Mary denies. Jeremiah takes the group out for a "historical" tour of New Orleans which turns out to be a tour of haunted houses. (Jeremiah knew it was a haunted tour all along.) This offends Lowell's beliefs and he quits the tour. Sabrina shows up the next morning with Mennonite dress and is ready to work, but is sent home because she was sick the day before and they don't want her handling food. Lowell gets a stylish haircut and new clothes. Jeremiah becomes more and more stressed and moody and takes it out on Carmela. Finally she has had enough and she leaves him.
37	6	"Forgive Me, Carmela"	December 30, 2018	N/A
Carmela agrees to meet Jeremiah and he apologizes for his behavior. No donuts will be sold today as they work through their issues, so Shelly uses the downtime to get a makeover. She wants to look English for her visit with her birth mother and also so she can go out on the town. She does not want to do anything permanent in case she wants to go back to being Mennonite. Afterwards she invites everyone to join her on a party bus. Sabrina gets sick again and goes to the hospital, and learns that she is pregnant and suffers a miscarriage. On her doctors' advice, she returns to Lancaster and enters a treatment program (and is doing well). Ada knows that Mary is the only one who can talk sense to Jeremiah and Carmela so she is invited to the house. Lowell tells his parents about Lisa's pregnancy and they are not happy about it. Mary takes a turn selling donuts and does very well. They pull up stakes and move to Nashville. Dawn feels comfortable there and gets a makeover, with Mary and Ada along for advice. Later her husband Keith shows up at the house and after some initial concern he decides to join Dawn as they all go out to clubs. They have a good time and Keith and Dawn rekindle their romance. All prepare to return home.
38	7	"Stay Amish or Go English?"	January 6, 2019	N/A
Ada invites everyone to her house and Lowell, Shelly and Dawn all state that they intend to leave the church. Lowell tells Lisa of his decision which disappoints her because she intends to remain in the church. Lowell tells his parents as well and they say he should stop coming around. As he is leaving he pets his dog who still accepts him. Shelly's boyfriend Matt proposes and she accepts. Dawn admits to Keith that she has been taking birth control pills all along and she intends to have a career and delay having children. She urges Keith to leave the church as well. Lisa distrusts the prenatal advice she has been receiving from her church midwife and she goes to an English facility, where she learns that she will be having twin boys. Shelly meets her birth mother and family, who tell her that her adoption was illegal because her birth mother never signed any papers while she was in prison. Shelly asks her Mennonite mother about this and she says its true that no papers were signed, but that her birth mother never came back to take responsibility after she was released from prison. This made Shelly respect her Mennonite mother even more. Mary learns that she has been reinstated in the Amish church.
39	8	"No Turning Back"	January 13, 2019	N/A
The Mennonites bombard Shelly with religious tracts to try to convince her to stay in the church. Matt and Shelly shop for a suit and dress and are questioned about whether they are ready for marriage. Shelly invites her Mennonite mother to the wedding but doesn't know if she will come. Matt and Shelly meet with an African-American pastor but Matt admits to him that he is not very religious. While checking the wedding venue, Matt declares that he is not ready for marriage and leaves, but soon returns. He admits that his divorce from his ex-wife is not yet final. Shelly says they should marry now and legalize it later. Lisa gets a makeover for the wedding, but does not want Lowell to think she will stay that way. On the morning of the wedding their pastor calls and says he cannot perform the ceremony. Their friend Jonas agrees to do it. Shelly's Mennonite mother does attend the wedding, but later tells Jeremiah that she thought Shelly's dress was immodest. Shelly's feelings are hurt when she is told this. Lowell and Lisa's twins are born prematurely. In the epilogue, Jeremiah and Carmela continue to go to marriage counseling. Jeremiah thinks the people he thought were his biological parents may not be related to him. He wants to take a DNA test and search for his real parents. Sabrina completed rehab and is in a new relationship. The twins are strong after 12 weeks in the NICU. Lisa's father unexpectedly left the Amish church which means she must help her mother more, and makes it harder for her to join Lowell in the English world. Shelly and Matt are adjusting to married life. Shelly learns that she has a biological sister in Arizona and is looking forward to meeting her. Dawn and Keith joined a Christian missionary trip to rekindle their marriage. Dawn's parents reconnected with her and accept her English lifestyle. Ada is gearing up for another donut season with Jeremiah and wants it to be successful. Mary reunited with her Amish son David and is accepted back in the Amish church ... for now.

=== Season 6 (2021) ===
No. overall	No. in season	Title	Original release date	U.S. viewers (millions)
40	1	"The Panic in Amish Park"	March 22, 2021	N/A
Ada gathers her family and friends together at her home in Sarasota Florida to ride out the pandemic. We learn what has happened to the cast since the previous season. Sabrina is expecting again. Rosanna is overwhelmed by the reality of leaving her family and suffers a panic attack.
41	2	"The Past Isn't the Past"	March 29, 2021	N/A
Jeremiah and Carmela travel to Ohio to connect with Dennis, who claims to be his biological father. Ada, Maureen and Rosanna enjoy a day at the beach. Jethro arranges a baby shower for Sabrina and plans to propose.
42	3	"The Time Has Come"	April 5, 2021	N/A
Jeremiah has to know if Dennis is really his biological father, and considers asking him to take a DNA test. Ada, Maureen and Rosanna go to work cleaning houses. Maureen and Rosanna go to dinner with some locals and wonder if they are truly curious about the Amish lifestyle with their questions or are mocking them. Sabrina goes into labor.
43	4	"The DNA Test Request"	April 12, 2021	N/A
Sabrina delivers her baby Skyler. Maureen and Rosanna get into a heated argument. Jeremiah asks Dennis to take the DNA test, and he complies. Later Jeremiah views the results and throws the phone down.
44	5	"The Truth About Jeremiah's Dad"	April 19, 2021	N/A
Jeremiah learns that Dennis is not his father, and that his biological father was murdered. Maureen and Rosanna shop for swimsuits, and Rosanna makes a friend. The pandemic worsens in Florida and all but Sabrina and Jethro move to Ada's house in Pennsylvania. Sabrina is upset that Jethro has been texting other women and they have a fight and he leaves.
45	6	"The Most Awkward First Kiss Ever"	April 26, 2021	N/A
46	7	"The Black Sheep"	May 3, 2021	N/A
47	8	"The Family Resemblance"	May 10, 2021	N/A
48	9	"The Last Time You See Family"	May 17, 2021	N/A
49	10	"The English Makeover"	May 24, 2021	N/A
Rosanna and Maureen get complete English makeovers and are very happy with the results. Jeremiah is content now that he knows where he came from, and he and Carmela want to have a baby. Daniel proposes to Maureen and she accepts.

=== Season 7 (2023) ===
No. overall	No. in season	Title	Original release date	U.S. viewers (millions)
50	1	"Karma Carmela Chameleon"	March 14, 2023	N/A
51	2	"Daniel, My Brother"	March 21, 2023	N/A
52	3	"Fannie, Are You OK?"	March 28, 2023	N/A
53	4	"Come On, Maureen"	April 4, 2023	N/A
54	5	"Meet You All the Way, Rosanna Rosanna"	April 11, 2023	N/A
55	6	"Smooth Oper-Ada"	April 18, 2023	N/A
56	7	"Johnny B. Goode"	April 25, 2023	N/A
57	8	"What's the Frequency, Kenneth"	May 2, 2023	N/A
58	9	"Jeremiah Was a Bullfrog"	May 9, 2023	N/A
59	10	"Funky Cold Sabrina"	May 16, 2023	N/A

== See also ==
- Amish in the City
- Breaking Amish
