= Mav =

Mav or MAV may refer to:

- Micro air vehicle, a type of remotely controlled unmanned aerial vehicle
- Mojave Aerospace Ventures, the holding company for the SpaceShipOne space flight effort
- Migraine-associated vertigo, vertigo or dizziness associated with migraine headache
- Municipal Association of Victoria
- MAV, stage name for Swedish country singer Anders Lundström
- Magyar Államvasutak (MÁV), the Hungarian national railway company Hungarian State Railways
- MAV, Minoan Air ICAO code
- MAV or Mars Ascent Vehicle:
  - A component of the NASA-ESA Mars sample-return mission
  - The lander in the novel The Martian and 2015 film based on the book
- M.A.V. (video game)
- Mav Cacharel (born 1957), Congolese soukous singer
- Mav Weller (born 1992), Australian rules footballer
- Mav Stevens (born 1982), Australian heavy metal guitarist

== See also ==
- Mavs, nickname for the Dallas Mavericks
