= Lilith (comics) =

Lilith, in comics, may refer to:

- Lilith (Marvel Comics), two comic book characters in the Marvel Comics
- Lilith (DC Comics), a supervillain in the DC Comics universe
- Lilith Clay, a superhero in the DC Comics universe

== See also ==
- Lilith (disambiguation)
