= Cynthia Rowley =

American fashion designer (born 1958)

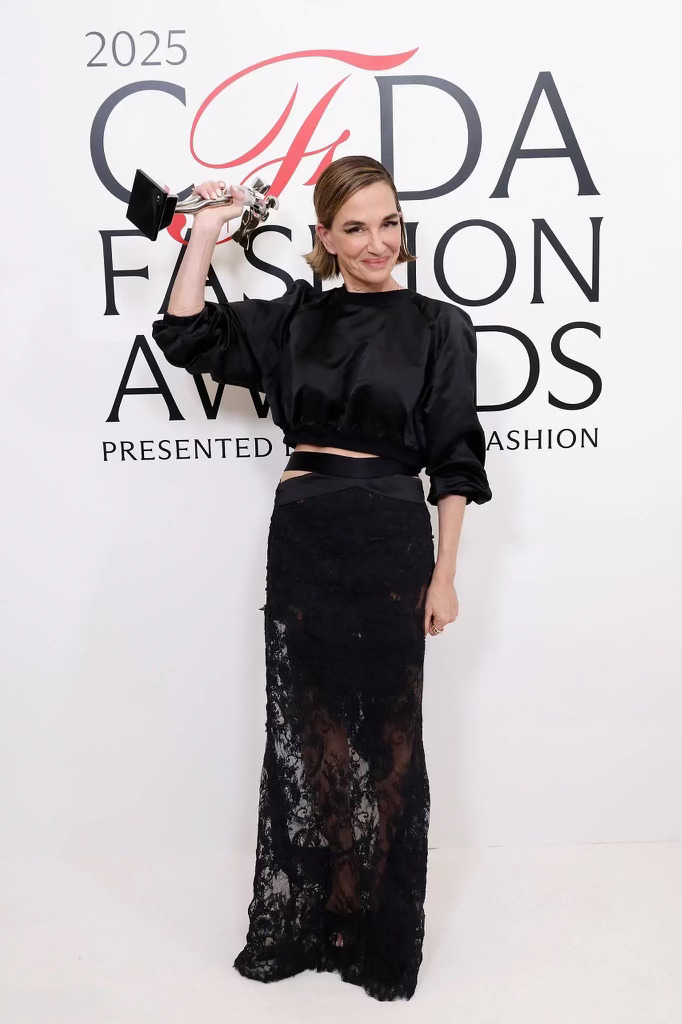
- Rowley at the CFDA Fashion Awards in 2006
- Born: July 29, 1958 (age 68); Barrington, Illinois, U.S.
- Education: School of the Art Institute of Chicago (BFA)
- Occupation: Fashion designer
- Children: 2

Cynthia Rowley (born July 29, 1958) is an American fashion designer, known for her books, television appearances and "flirty" and "carefree" women's clothing designs.

== Early life and education ==
Rowley is a native of Barrington, Illinois, a northwestern suburb of Chicago. She is one of three children born to Ed Rowley, a former science teacher, and his wife, Clementine, who was a painter. Rowley made her first dress at age seven. Her grandparents included the designer of the Pabst Blue Ribbon logo and a painter. She graduated from Barrington High School and earned a Bachelor of Fine Arts from the School of the Art Institute of Chicago in 1981. Rowley was kicked out of her junior year art show at SAIC because her use of wings in her design. In an interview with the Chicago Tribune, Rowley said that Marshall Field's had bought her first collection while she was still a student at SAIC.

== Career ==
In 1981, Rowley won an SAIC fellowship award in her senior year and used the money to move from Chicago to New York City. She then launched her career with $3,000 in seed money from one of her grandmothers.

Since Rowley launched her first capsule collection in 1988, has grown to include women's wear, handbags, glasses, color cosmetics, fragrance, wetsuits and swimwear, home furnishings, bedding products, and office accessories.

The designer also created a line of home accessories called Swell, based on a book series she co-wrote with friend Ilene Rosenzweig, which made its debut at Target in 2003. In 2011 Rowley presented the Mr. Powers collection, a limited menswear range named after her husband Bill Powers.

Rowley's fashions are presented bi-annually at New York Fashion Week. Signature Cynthia Rowley stores are in New York City, Montauk, Houston, Greenwich, CT, and Newport Beach as well as at the company's web store.

Rowley's designs were described by The New York Times as "flirty, vibrantly colored dresses and tops in wispy materials" that have "a whiff of the carefree, simple spirit" of Claire McCardell.

=== Awards ===
The Council of Fashion Designers of America honored Rowley with a Perry Ellis Award for New Fashion Talent in 1994. In 2012, Rowley was given the School of the Art Institute of Chicago's Legend of Fashion award. In 2015, Rowley won the Designer of the Year award at the 37th Annual American Apparel and Footwear Association American Image Awards. | In 2023, Rowley received an honorary doctorate from the Art Institute of Chicago.

=== Media ===
Rowley has appeared as a judge on the reality television programs 24 Hour Catwalk, America's Next Top Model, Project Runway and Design Star and has been a guest on The Today Show, Good Morning America, The Oprah Winfrey Show, Gossip Girl, Celebrity Jeopardy, and the Late Show with David Letterman, among other programs. The TV series Return to Amish on the TLC network follows ex-Amish Kate Stoltzfus as she interns at Rowley's design company.

She has written and co-written several books:

- Slim: A Fantasy Memoir (Random House, 2007)
- The Swell Dressed Party (with co-author Ilene Rosenzweig, Atria, 2005)
- Swell Holiday (with Rosenzweig, Atria, 2003)
- Home Swell Home (with Rosenzweig, Atria, 2002)
- Swell: A Girl's Guide to the Good Life (with Rosenzweig, Time Warner, 1999)

== Personal life ==
Rowley's first husband was photographer Tom Sullivan, who died of cancer at the age of 32 in 1994. Rowley married Brooklyn sculptor William Keenan Jr., with whom she had a daughter, Kit Keenan (born 1999). Kit released her own line of clothing in 2018, titled KIT. In 2019, Cynthia and Kit created a podcast together called Ageless. In 2021, Kit was a contestant on The Bachelor, where she alluded to having a well-known mother After Rowley and Keenan Jr. divorced, she married William "Bill" Powers, an art dealer, writer, and owner of the Half Gallery in Manhattan's Upper East Side, on September 17, 2005, at the home of photographer Peter Beard.
