= Breaking Amish: Brave New World =

American reality television series

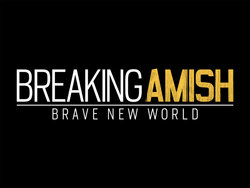
- Genre: Reality
- Country of origin: United States
- Original language: English
- No. of seasons: 1
- No. of episodes: 10

Production
- Running time: 42 to 44 minutes
- Production company: Hot Snakes Media

Original release
- Network: TLC
- Release: May 12 – July 14, 2013

Related
- Breaking Amish

Breaking Amish: Brave New World is an American reality television series on TLC. The series is a spin-off of Breaking Amish and encompasses the original cast from season one as they relocate and reside in Pinecraft, a small neighborhood located within Sarasota, Florida where there is a community of ex-Amish and Amish. It chronicles the lives of the cast as they endure the realities of living in new surroundings and face new situations involving work, friendship, romance, and lifestyle. It also includes the drama that develops between cast members as they undergo various experiences.

== Cast ==
Cast	Age^{1}	Community	Details
Rebecca Byler	21	Amish	From Punxsutawney, Pennsylvania. He has one daughter and married Abe in the season finale of Breaking Amish, and is currently expecting her second child.
Kate Stoltzfus	22	Amish	Daughter of a bishop, grew up in Lancaster, Pennsylvania, previously spent some time in Florida.
Abe Schmucker	23	Amish	From Punxsutawney, Pennsylvania. Married Rebecca on the season finale of Breaking Amish, and is currently expecting a child with her.
Sabrina High	26	Mennonite	Adopted by a Mennonite family, born to Puerto Rican and Italian parents.
Jeremiah Raber	33	Amish	Adopted by an Amish family, grew up in Holmes County, Ohio.

^Note 1: Age at the time of filming.

== Episodes ==
No. in season	Title	Original release date	U.S. viewers (millions)
1	"Nothing to Lose"	May 12, 2013	2.14
2	"Shunned & on the Run"	May 19, 2013	1.87
3	"Facing Demons"	May 26, 2013	1.63
4	"Flirting With Disaster"	June 2, 2013	2.34
5	"What's the Beef?"	June 9, 2013	1.89
6	"Forbidden Fruit"	June 16, 2013	1.70
7	"Devil in a Red Dress"	June 23, 2013	2.15
8	"A Brother's Secret"	June 30, 2013	2.07
9	"The Shunning Truth — Part 1"	July 7, 2013	2.38
10	"The Shunning Truth — Part 2"	July 14, 2013	2.07

== Reception ==
Allison Keene of The Hollywood Reporter says the show is struggling with authenticity.
