= Lilita =

- Lilita Bērziņa
- Lilita Ozoliņa
- Lilita Zatlere
- Elisa María Avelina "Lilita" Carrió, or Elisa Carrió, Argentine lawyer, professor, and politician
- Lillian ("'Lilly"' or "'Lilita"') Somoza de Sevilla Sacasa, or Lillian Somoza de Sevilla Sacasa

== Fictional characters ==
- Lilita Morgan, vampire from Canadian single-frame comedy-drama web series Carmilla

== See also ==
- Lilith
- Lilit (given name)
- Lolita
