= Lilith (given name) =

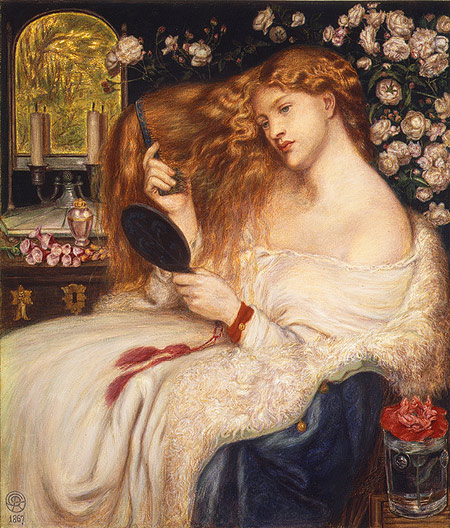
- Lady Lilith by Dante Gabriel Rossetti, 1867.
- Gender: Female
- Language: Akkadian from lilû

Origin
- Meaning: spirit, demon

Other names
- Related names: Lilit, Lilita, Lillith

Lilith is a feminine given name sometimes given in reference to Lilith, a character in Jewish folklore who was said to be the first wife of the first man Adam who disobeyed him, was banished from the Garden of Eden, and who became a mythical she-demon. The mythological tale has inspired modern feminists.

It was also the name of Lilith Fair, a concert tour and traveling music festival from 1997 to 1999 that featured only female artists and female-led bands.

Lilith and Black Moon Lilith are placements in modern astrology that are said to represent women's liberation.

Its similarity in sound to the etymologically unrelated, popular name Lily might also have increased awareness of the name. Other names starting with the letter L as well as mythological names have been well used by new parents in recent years.

Lillith is a spelling variant. Other variants include the Armenian Lilit and the Latvian Lilita.

== Usage ==
Lilith has been among the top 1,000 names in use for newborn girls in the United States since 2010 and among the top 300 names since 2021. It has been among the top 1,000 names in use for newborn girls in England and Wales since 2015. It ranked among the top 500 names for newborn girls in Canada in 2021.

== People ==
- Lilith Martin Wilson (1886–1937), American politician
- Lilith Nagar (born 1935), Israeli Arabic-language television host, actress, and singer
- Lilith Norman (1927–2017), Australian children's writer
- Lilith Saintcrow (born 1976), American author
- Lilith Stangenberg (born 1988), German stage and film actress
- Lilita Bērziņa (1903–1983), Latvian stage and film actress

== Notable fictional characters ==
- Lilith Clay, also known as Omen, a DC Comics super heroine
- Lilith (Marvel Comics)
- Lilith Sternin, a character on the television series Cheers and Frasier
- Lilith (Supernatural)
- Lilith Iyapo, a character in the Lilith's Brood science fiction book trilogy by Octavia Butler
- Lilith Clawthorne, a character from The Owl House

== See also ==
- Lilit (given name)
- Lilita Zatlere (born 1953), Latvian businesswoman
- Lilith (disambiguation)
