= Chromehounds =

2006 video game

- Developer: FromSoftware
- Publisher: Sega: JP: FromSoftware
- Director: Takuji Yoshida
- Producer: Toshifumi Nabeshima
- Artists: Isao Saito; Hisao Yamada
- Composer: Kota Hoshino
- Platform: Xbox 360
- Release: JP: June 29, 2006; EU: July 7, 2006; NA: July 11, 2006; AU: July 18, 2006
- Genre: Mech simulator
- Modes: Single-player, multiplayer

Chromehounds is a 2006 mech simulator video game developed by FromSoftware and published by Sega for the Xbox 360. The game is set in an alternate universe where mecha known as HOUNDs battle for control of Neroimus, a fictional region near the Black Sea. Chromehounds features a system for personalized customization of the player's mecha and an online campaign mode where players wage war in a persistent world over Xbox Live. The game's online servers were shut down in January 2010. The game's online server functionality was partly restored in May 2025 using Xenia Canary emulation.

== Gameplay ==
Chromehounds is a mech combat simulation game where the player controls customizable mechs, called HOUNDs, from a third-person perspective. The game offers opportunities for strategic thinking, as there are sometime multiple objectives for each mission. Both the single player and online game modes occupy different points in the game's timeline: the Single Player "Offline" story mode chronicles events just prior to the outbreak of the Neroimus War, the game's central conflict, while the Xbox Live "Online" mode takes place during the actual war.

There are six different mech classes known as Role Types (RT) to choose from in Chromehounds. Each class of mech has its own set of unique missions in the single-player campaign mode. Several types of other mechs and vehicles can be found including real world vehicles such as the M1A1 Abrams, Leopard 1A5, T-72B1, and Merkava Mk.I main battle tanks.

=== Garage mode ===
Chromehounds features a garage mode where the player can customize HOUNDs. While the garages in each mode are functionally identical, HOUNDs constructed in single-player is limited to the parts won in single-player missions.

New parts for HOUNDs can be unlocked by completing single-player missions, purchased in in-game shops and some parts are available for free/pay download on Xbox Live Marketplace. Special parts can also be bid on in the Lottery. These include experimental parts developed by the player's own country, but have been discontinued by all three nations, and captured parts won in battle. Every day winners are chosen randomly and the bidding begins again. The selection of captured parts changes every day, and occasionally old experimental parts are moved to the normal shop and new ones are placed in the lottery to replace them. Bids are limited on a squad basis and higher ranked squads are allowed to place more bids (all experimental parts are now able to be purchased in the in-game shops, in their respective countries).

=== Neroimus War ===
The Neroimus War was an online campaign mode which involves the three countries fighting for the region of Neroimus. Players can join or make a squad, the equivalent of a clan or guild in other online games, to participate. The map of Neroimus is divided into several areas connected by paths. Each area is divided into several maps. Players may launch a mission within any enemy area adjacent to a friendly area, or in any friendly area which is under attack. Victory yields merit points, which raise your rank, captured parts for the lottery, and capture points. When a country has gained a certain amount of capture points on a map, 25,000 to 32,000 for normal battlegrounds and 50,000 for capital cities, that map is turned over to the country. An area belongs to the country which has the most capture points in its maps. When a capital city falls, all areas under that country become part of the conquering country, and players may only fight to reclaim their capital, or seek asylum in another country. The War ends when one country controls the entire map or after two months have passed. After a war ends, squads may choose to change alliance to a different country, and then the next War begins.

On August 7, 2009, Sega announced that the online servers would be shut down on January 6, 2010. From that point on, the Neroimus War mode ceased to function and players were only able to access the offline single-player mode.

== Plot ==
Chromehounds takes place in an alternate history that diverges in 1945, with the founding of weapons manufacturer Rafzekael in the wake of World War II. In 1980, Rafzekael unveiled the first Advanced Combat Vehicle (ACV), a mech based on a stolen American design for a bipedal tank. ACV technology was distributed to the world's major powers in 1981 after a series of massive solar flares caused catastrophic disruptions to global infrastructure that resulted in violent geopolitical upheavals, and ACVs were rapidly developed into more powerful weapons called HOUNDs. By 1992, a trio of new countries emerge in the Neroimus region on the southeast coast of the Black Sea: the Democratic Republic of Tarakia, the Republic of Morskoj, and the Kingdom of Sal Kar.

The player is the Mercenary, who is recruited by Rafzekael's mercenary division in 2000 and learns the ropes of HOUND piloting from Edgardo Gilardino, a legendary veteran who helped forge Rafzekael mercenaries' reputation as the best of the best. In 2003, the Mercenary's unit is deployed to the Neroimus region as local tensions soar due to internal instabilities and a series of skirmishes along the three countries' shared borders. Over the course of their deployment, portrayed across six sequential campaigns in which the Mercenary advances through different HOUND roles, the border dispute intensifies and the Mercenary realizes that the deteriorating situation in Neroimus is being orchestrated by an unknown third party. The Mercenary also encounters two members of Cerberus Squad, a legendary three-man HOUND unit known for its powerful weapons and ruthless tactics.

Once the player has completed all six campaigns, the final mission becomes available. In 2006, Sal Kar builds a forward base in the mountainous Tagin region, where the borders of all three Neroimus countries meet. Tarakia and Morskoj denounce the base's presence as an act of aggression, but Sal Kar claims it is a defensive measure necessitated by the ongoing border skirmishes. Five months later, the completed Sal Kari base comes under attack by an unknown HOUND unit, and amid the confusion all three countries mobilize for full-scale war. Rafzekael sends the Mercenary to destroy the interlopers and discovers they are Cerberus Squad, whose third member is revealed to be Edgardo. The Mercenary is outmatched, but manages to defeat their former mentor. Before Edgardo dies, he acknowledges the Mercenary's skill, but asserts that the attack on the Sal Kari base has made war inevitable, which will satisfy his mysterious employer. His prediction proves correct: citing the attack as a casus belli, Sal Kar, Tarakia, and Morskoj declare war on each other, igniting the Neroimus War for regional supremacy (which serves as the basis for the game's eponymous online multiplayer mode).

== Reception ==
Reception

Aggregate score
Aggregator	Score
Metacritic	71/100

Review scores
Publication	Score
Electronic Gaming Monthly	6.33/10
Eurogamer	4/10
Famitsu	33/40 (X360) 32/40
Game Informer	7/10
GamePro	3/5
GameRevolution	C
GameSpot	7.9/10
GameSpy	3.5/5
GameTrailers	7.4/10
GameZone	7.4/10
IGN	6.9/10
Official Xbox Magazine (US)	6.5/10
Detroit Free Press	3/4
USA Today	6.5/10

The game received "average" reviews according to the review aggregation website Metacritic. Most gaming critics complimented the game's online play and customization options, but criticized it for having a poor story, average graphics, and slow-paced gameplay. In Japan, Famitsu gave it a score of 33 out of 40, while Famitsu X360 gave it a score of one nine, two eights, and one seven for a total of 32 out of 40.

Maxim gave it a score of four stars out of five, saying, "Not unlike when you used to select frilly ensembles for your little sister's Barbie collection (when no one was looking), Chromehounds lets you play big, bad burly man." Detroit Free Press gave it three stars out of four and said that it "will suck you into its wartime world if you let it. And once you've adjusted to the game's quirks and interface, you'll find it very enjoyable." However, USA Today gave it a score of six-and-a-half stars out of ten, calling it "a war worth avoiding. Online play is enjoyable, and the details on the mechs are superb. But much like these giant metal 'soldiers,' the game lacks life." The Sydney Morning Herald gave it two-and-a-half stars out of five and said that it "offers a smattering of explosive action" as long as players "don't fall asleep at the wheel".

The game was awarded Game of the Month in the August 2006 issue of Newtype USA. During the 10th Annual Interactive Achievement Awards, the Academy of Interactive Arts & Sciences nominated Chromehounds for "Outstanding Achievement in Online Gameplay".

== Spiritual successor ==
In 2012, developer Bombdog Studios embarked on creating a spiritual successor to Chromehounds titled M.A.V. (Modular Assault Vehicle). Over the course of its development, a core community of old Chromehounds players formed around the title.
