= Phillippi Creek =

Tidal creek in Florida

Coordinates: 27°16′16″N 82°32′17″W

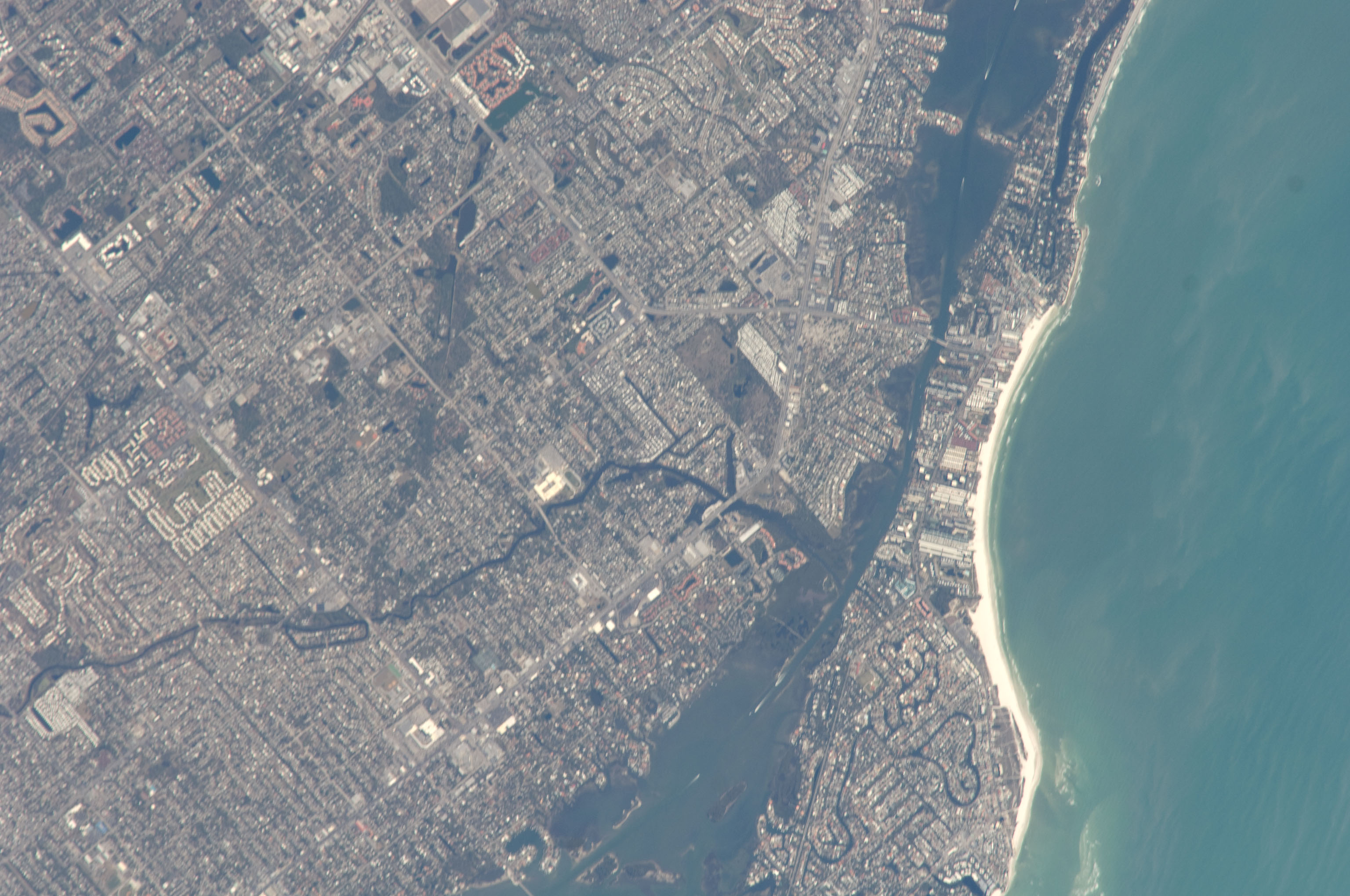
Aerial view of Phillippi Creek connecting to Roberts Bay and the intercoastal waterway by Siesta Key taken from ISS Expedition 18

Phillippi Creek is a 7.2-mile (11.6 km) tidal creek in Sarasota, Florida. In 2026 it is being dredged to prevent flooding during storms. A railroad trestle is being removed next to a Legacy Trail crossing.

Named for Phillippi Bermudez who had a fishing rancho in the area, Phillippi Creek is used for fishing and paddlesports including kayaking and stand-up paddleboarding. Phillippi Estate Park, including the Edson Keith Estate, are along the creek. A seasonal farmers' market event is held there on Wednesdays, from October through to April.

Phillippi Creek was dredged and damned in the 1880s and 1960s.

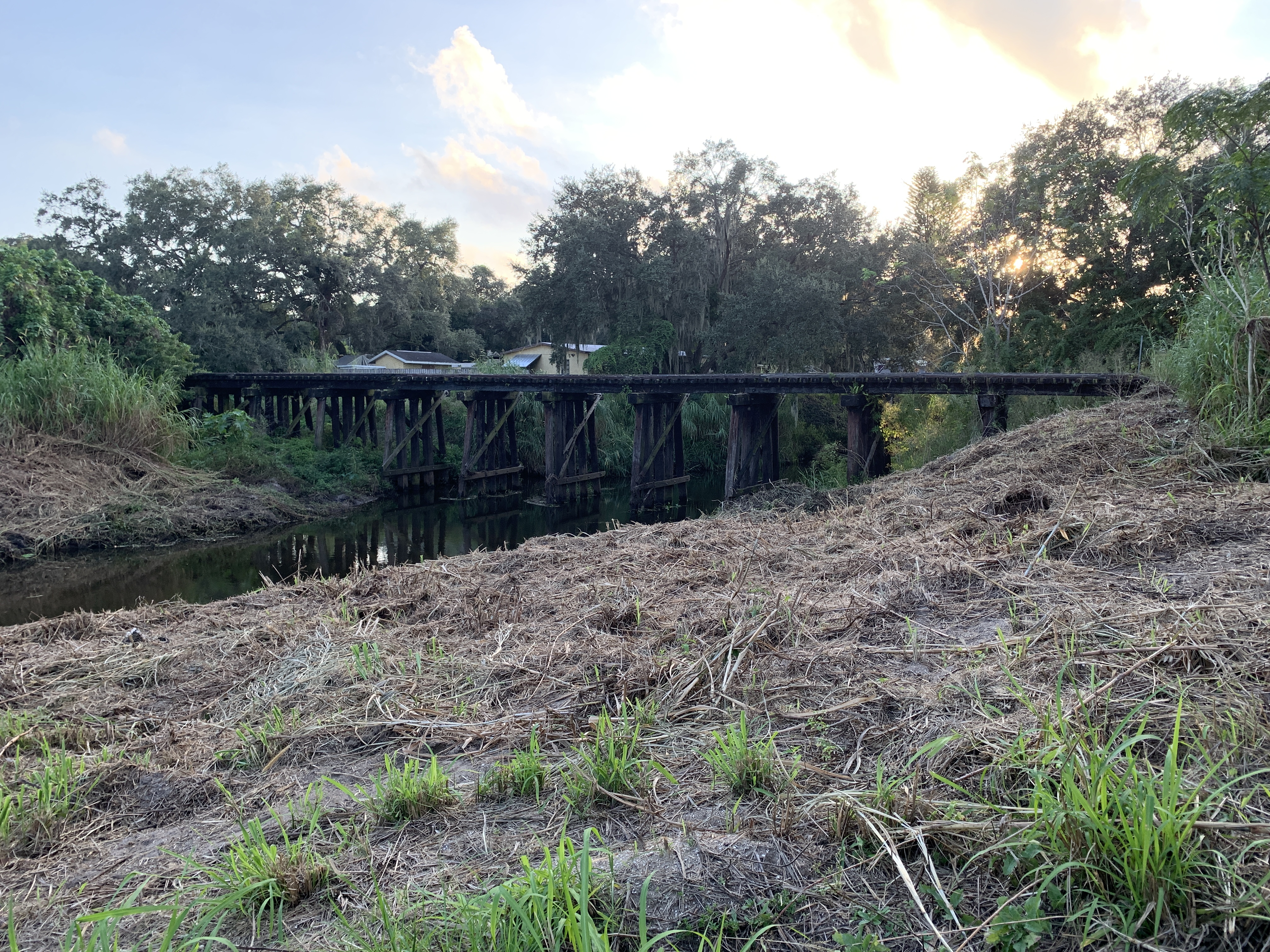

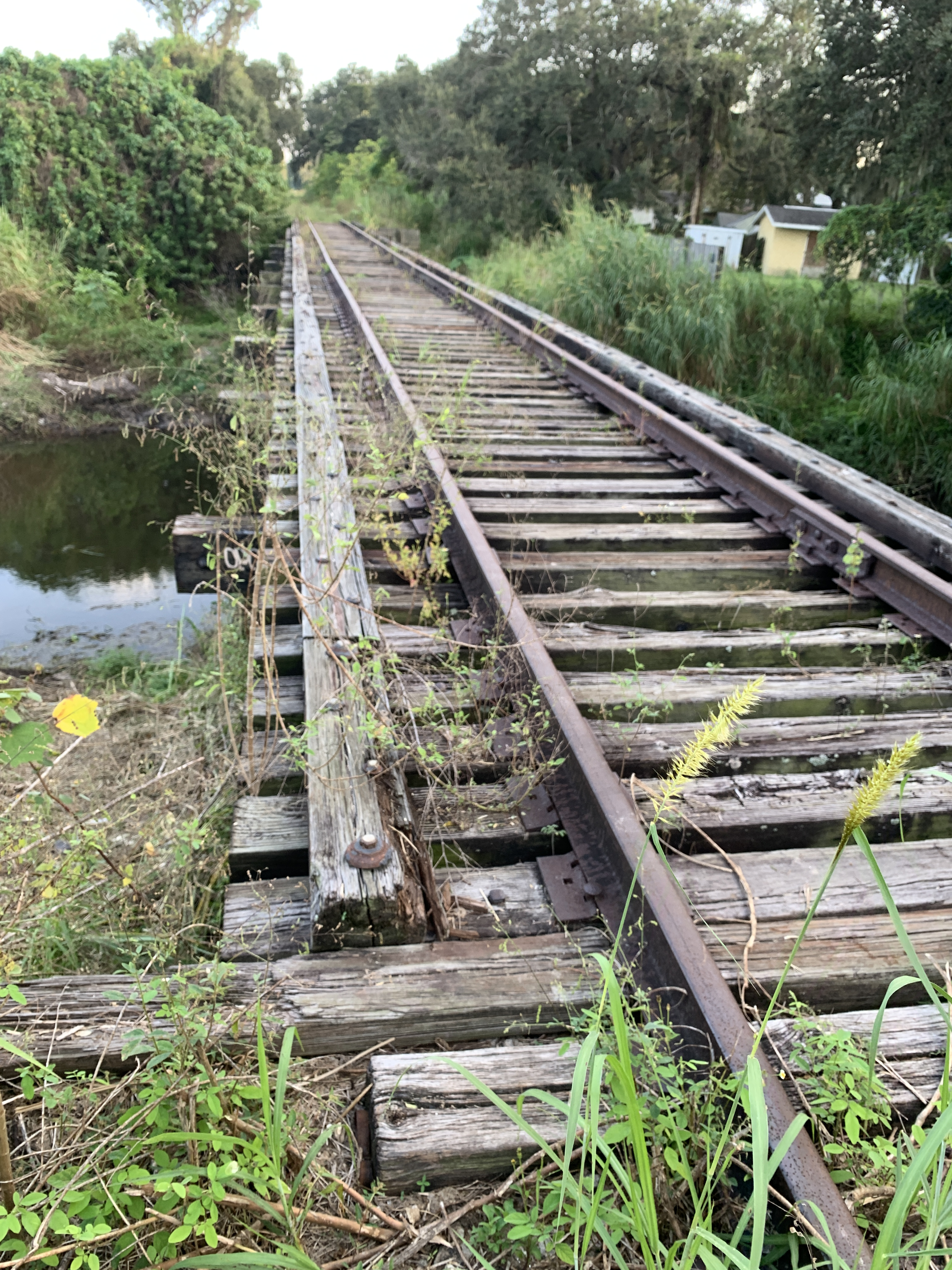
Railroad bridge across it

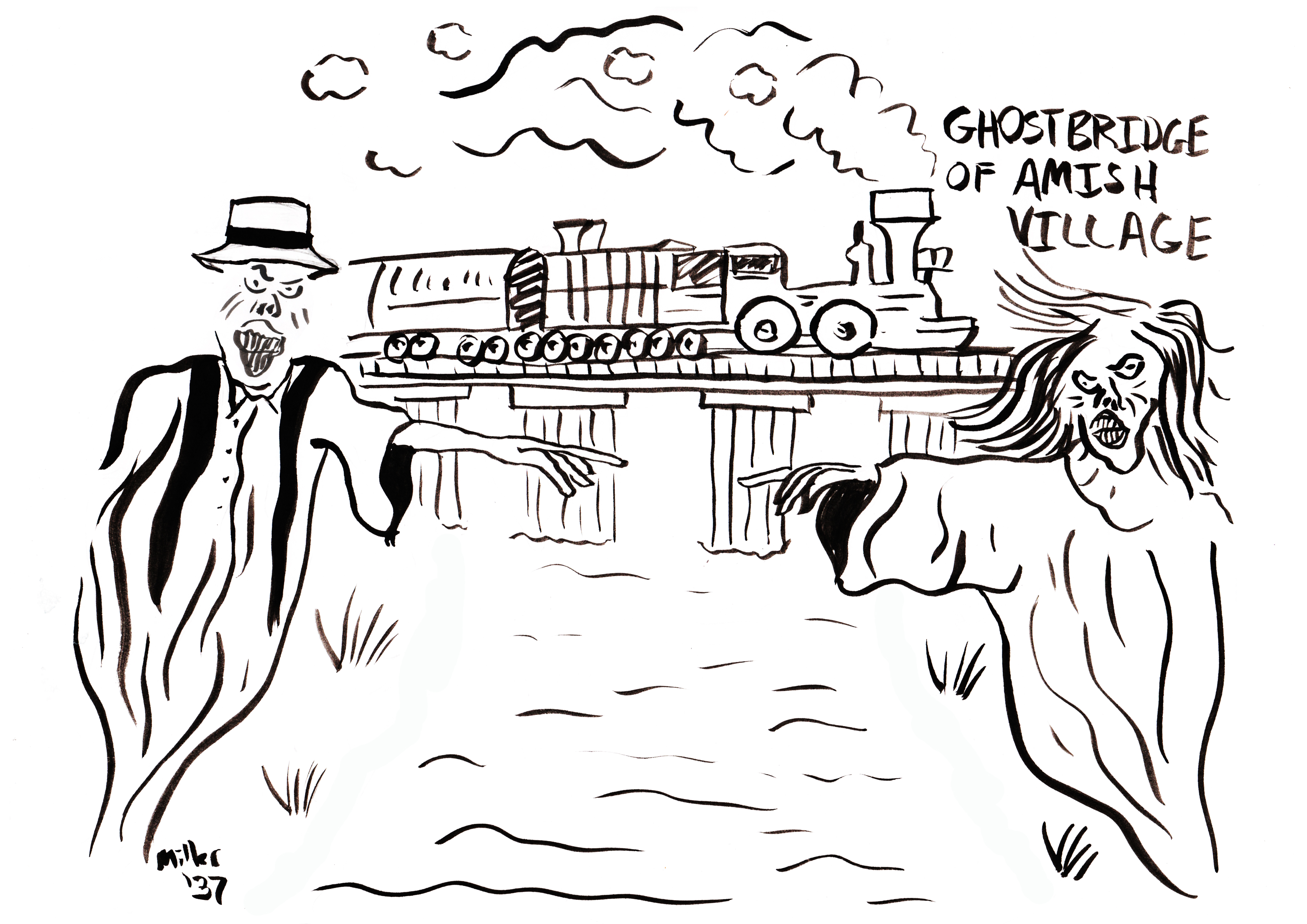
"Ghost bridge of Amish Village" cartoon

It flows from the Fruitville, Florida area through various neighborhoods including Southgate, Pinecraft, Florida, River Forest, Forest Lakes, and Maine Colony.

It passes by the Pinecraft Park, Riverview High School and the Victor Lundy designed Southgate Community Center. Artist Syd Solomon lived along it. Dams helped irrigate citrus. Dredged and channelized water moves faster down it and flooding has been a problem.

The Phillippi Creek Basin, also known as Roberts Bay North Watershed, drains about 57 square miles (150 km^{2}).

Homes flooded along it in 2024 as a result of major storms including Hurricane Debby. In 2025 Sarasota County received a federal permit to dredge it. Sarasota County budgeted about $17 million to remove sediment deposits from the creek. In 2025 Sarasota County spent about $2.5 million to acquire 2.4 acres (0.97 ha) of property on Ashton Road for a new park along Phillippi Creek that will provide boating access.

Florida State Road 758 crosses the creek. Phillippi Creek Oyster Bar is along it.

== See also ==
- Flood Control Act of 1965
- 1962 Atlantic hurricane season
