= Fruitville, Florida =

- Census-designated place
- Location in Sarasota County and the state of Florida
- Coordinates: 27°19′58″N 82°27′41″W
- Country: United States
- State: Florida
- County: Sarasota

Area
  - Total: 7.13 sq mi (18.46 km^{2})
  - Land: 6.83 sq mi (17.68 km^{2})
  - Water: 0.30 sq mi (0.78 km^{2}) 4.21%
- Elevation: 30 ft (9.1 m)

Population (2020)
  - Total: 15,484
  - Density: 2,268.9/sq mi (876.04/km^{2})
- Time zone: UTC−05 (Eastern Time Zone)
  - Summer (DST): UTC−04 (EDT)
- ZIP code: 34232
- Area code: 941
- FIPS code: 12-25000
- GNIS feature ID: 2402510

Fruitville is a census-designated place (CDP) in Sarasota County, Florida, United States. The population was 15,484 at the 2020 census, up from 13,224 at the 2010 census. It is part of the North Port–Bradenton–Sarasota, Florida Metropolitan Statistical Area.

== History ==
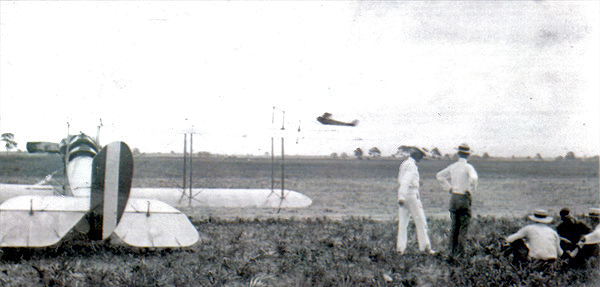
Army "Jenny" planes and observers at Franklin Field in Sarasota.

Aerial photograph of Fruitville farms in 1948.

An 1857 map of the "Country in the Vicinity of Manatee" during the Third Seminole War shows settlers near what is now Fruitville. The area had a large sawgrass swamp that was bounded on the east by Tatum Ridge (named for the George Tatum Sr., 1822–1910), north and west by Phillippi Creek with its headwaters in the Meadows residential development through Circus Hammock and Bobby Jones municipal golf course and Bee Ridge to the south. This marshland was home to wild Florida Cracker cattle.

In 1923, the Sarasota-Fruitville drainage district was established (see also Bertha Palmer family). The new district provided around 8,000 acres of land for cultivation near the community of Fruitville. The farm land was formed by draining the historic wetland and dredging a drainage canal to Phillippi Creek, which drained roughly 26,000 acres. This area was later reclaimed as a wetland, and became the Celery Fields Regional Stormwater Facility.

After the Civil War, a new wave of pioneers began to settle in Florida thanks to a growing citrus industry. In 1876, Charles Reaves (1847–1931) settled in what is now considered Fruitville. According to some sources, he was the one who named the area Fruitville after the abundance of fruit in the area. In 1895, Reaves would go on to become the postmaster for the area's 115 residents.

The first church in what is now Sarasota County was the Friendship Baptist Church established by Reverend John Wright Hendry (1836–1907). The church was chartered in 1875 and a small pine log structure was used for the congregation until a new church was erected in 1876, using some of the original lumber from the first church. From 1877 to 1891, Isaac Alderman Redd (1835–1912) was pastor of the Friendship Baptist Church which first met in the Bee Ridge community. In 1887, the Florida Mortgage and Investment Company of Scotland donated land in Fruitville to the church for the establishment of the community's first cemetery.

Also in 1887, Charles and his wife Martha Tatum Reaves (daughter of George Tatum Sr.,1853-1935) converted their corncrib into Fruitville's first school for their three children and seven neighbors. They went on to hire Miss Josie Clower as the first teacher in the area. After citizens petitioned for a modern school building, funding was granted from the Works Progress Administration to build Fruitville Elementary in 1941. Rural schools in the nearby villages of Tatum Ridge and Old Miakka were closed, with their students bussed to the new school in Fruitville.

A map from 1902 shows Fruitville on the map as a community.

In May 1918, Franklin Field (named after then-mayor George Franklin) began operating as a military airfield during World War I. The Franklin airfield was located north of Fruitville Road and east of what is now Tuttle road. The airfield was an auxiliary landing station for the U.S. Army Air Service and housed, at the least, several Curtiss JN "Jenny" planes. With the war over, the airfield saw less and less traffic and was likely unused by 1920. In 1924 the land was developed for a new subdivision.

The first municipal airport in Sarasota county was located in Fruitville. It was dedicated in 1929, located on a 160-acre site near the intersection of 12th Street and Beneva Road (then named Oriente Avenue). The airport was renamed Lowe Field after Johnny Lowe purchased the land during World War II. After the war, most civilian air traffic moved to the Sarasota-Bradenton Airport. Lowe Field closed in 1961 and the land was sold.

Throughout the 1960s and 70s, there was a migrant camp called Sababo in Fruitville that supplied much of the labor force for area's farm industry. A major crop in the area was celery. In 1966, there was an estimated 2,000 migrant workers in Sarasota County. To provide healthcare and education to this population, on December 5, 1966, the Fruitville Area Medical and Educational (FAME) Center was opened.

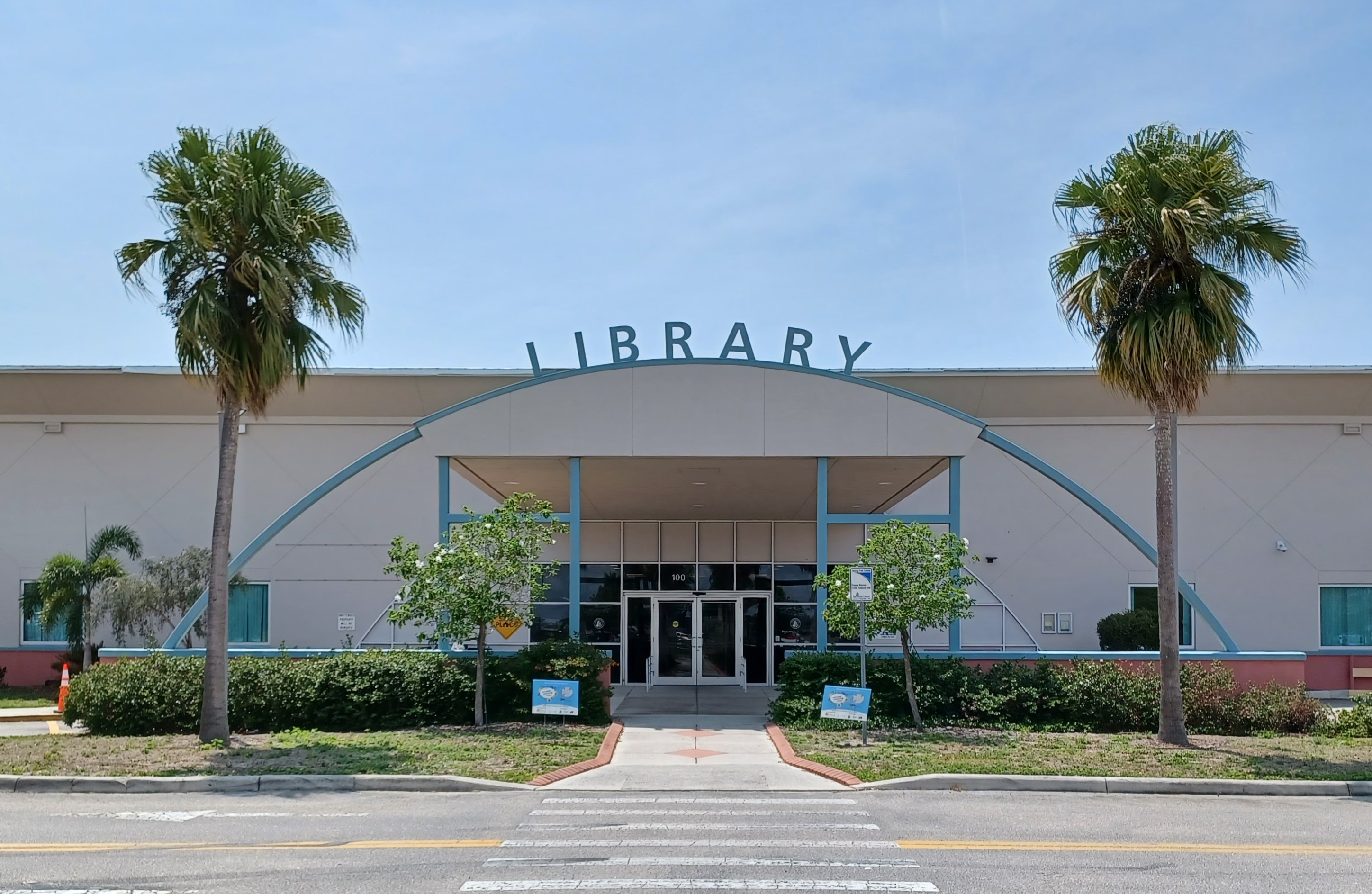
Fruitville Library

In November 1990, Litchfield's Cinema 10 opened in the Sarasota Commons, the community's first modern movie theater. As a promotion, the theater offered tickets for only 50 cents during its opening. Some of the films shown for its pre-opening weekend were Pretty Woman and Back to the Future III.

On December 8, 2001, the Fruitville Library was opened to serve the Fruitville community as a part of the Sarasota County Library System. The library was initially called East County Library throughout its land-use planning process before the Sarasota County Commission renamed the library a month prior to its opening.

== Geography ==
According to the United States Census Bureau, the CDP has a total area of 7.13 square miles (18.46 km^{2}), of which 6.83 square miles (17.68 km^{2}) is land and 0.30 square miles (0.78 km^{2}), or 4.21%, is water.

== Demographics ==
Historical population
Census	Pop.	Note	%±
1960	2,131		—
1970	1,531		−28.2%
1980	3,070		100.5%
1990	9,808		219.5%
2000	12,741		29.9%
2010	13,224		3.8%
2020	15,484		17.1%

=== 2020 census ===
As of the 2020 census, Fruitville had a population of 15,484. The median age was 45.2 years. 17.3% of residents were under the age of 18 and 22.7% of residents were 65 years of age or older. For every 100 females there were 90.4 males, and for every 100 females age 18 and over there were 88.4 males age 18 and over.

100.0% of residents lived in urban areas, while 0.0% lived in rural areas.

There were 6,629 households in Fruitville, of which 22.8% had children under the age of 18 living in them. Of all households, 44.7% were married-couple households, 18.0% were households with a male householder and no spouse or partner present, and 29.4% were households with a female householder and no spouse or partner present. About 31.0% of all households were made up of individuals and 14.3% had someone living alone who was 65 years of age or older.

There were 7,578 housing units, of which 12.5% were vacant. The homeowner vacancy rate was 0.8% and the rental vacancy rate was 20.6%.

Racial composition as of the 2020 census
Race	Number	Percent
White	12,503	80.7%
Black or African American	399	2.6%
American Indian and Alaska Native	58	0.4%
Asian	410	2.6%
Native Hawaiian and Other Pacific Islander	14	0.1%
Some other race	714	4.6%
Two or more races	1,386	9.0%
Hispanic or Latino (of any race)	1,890	12.2%

=== Demographic estimates ===
According to U.S. Census Bureau QuickFacts, there were 2.32 persons per household, 1,172 veterans, and 12.9% of residents were foreign born. QuickFacts also reported that 4% of residents were under age 5 and 45% were between ages 18 and 64.

The median value of owner-occupied housing units was $275,600 and the median gross rent was $1,639. Median household income was $72,512, and 7.6% of the population lived below the poverty threshold. 92.6% of households had a computer and 88.1% had a broadband internet subscription.

Of residents age 25 and older, 91.0% had a high school degree or higher and 33.0% had a bachelor's degree or higher. Of residents under age 65, 6.8% lived with a disability and 17.2% did not have health insurance.

== Education ==
Fruitville is home to several public and private schools including:

- Fruitville Elementary
- Julie Rohr Academy
- Learning Academy of Sarasota
- McIntosh Middle School
- Sarasota Academy of the Arts
- Sarasota Christian School
- Saint Martha's Catholic School
- Saint Mary Academy
- Cardinal Mooney High School

It is also home to the Fruitville Library, a branch of the Sarasota County Library System.
