= Lilit (given name) =

- Lilit Bleyan
- Lilit Galstyan
- Lilit Haroyan
- Lilit Harutyunyan
- Lilit Hovhannisyan (born 1987), Armenian pop singer
- Lilit Karapetyan
- Lilit Makunts
- Lilit Manukyan
- Lilit Martirosyan
- Lilit Mkrtchian (born 1982), Armenian chess player
- Lilit Mkrtchyan (shooter)
- Lilit Phra Lo
- Lilit Pipoyan (born 1955), Armenian musician
- Lilit Soghomonyan
- Lilit Stepanyan
- Lilit Teryan

== See also ==
- Lilita
- Lilith
- Lilith (given name)
