= Kate Stoltz =

American model and designer

- Occupations: Model, designer
- Known for: Breaking Amish
- Website: www.katestoltz.com

Kate Stoltzfus, known professionally as Kate Stoltz, is an American model, designer, and television personality based in New York City. She was one of the five stars of the reality show Breaking Amish and has appeared on one of the show sequels Breaking Amish: Brave New World.

== Early life and education ==
Stoltz was born Katie Stoltzfus to an Amish family. Kate Stoltz was the middle child in a family of seven children, and spent her days working on the farm and sewing clothing for herself and her immediate family.

== Career ==
=== Television ===
Stoltz starred in Breaking Amish, a reality television show on the TLC network. She appeared in the first two seasons and participated in the first three seasons of the follow-up show Return to Amish, which premiered on June 1, 2014.

=== Modeling ===
Stoltz moved to New York City to pursue a career in modeling. She worked for Union Bay, Spiegel, Bella, and Gypsy Sisters. She posed for Maxim magazine in July 2013.

=== Kate Stoltz label ===
She began her own fashion line in 2015, called the Kate Stoltz label. The label focuses on made to measure luxury women's wear.
