= Amazing Princess Sarah =

2014 video game

- Developer: Haruneko
- Publisher: Haruneko
- Designer: Giovanni Simotti
- Engine: XNA
- Platforms: Xbox 360, Windows, Windows Phone, Xbox One, Nintendo Switch, PlayStation 4
- Release: Xbox 360; July 9, 2014; Windows; August 15, 2014; Windows Phone; December 9, 2014; Xbox One; January 29, 2016; Switch; November 12, 2021; PS4; May 20, 2022
- Genres: Platform-adventure, Metroidvania
- Mode: Single-player

Amazing Princess Sarah is a platform-adventure video game developed and released by Haruneko for the Xbox 360's Xbox Live Indie Games, Microsoft Windows (Steam and Desura), and Windows Phone 7/8 in 2014. On June 17 of 2015, it was announced that the game was selected to become part of Microsoft's ID@Xbox program.

== Gameplay ==
The gameplay involves 2D platforming with limited combat while navigating though several castle stages. Throwing certain enemies will have different affects. Additionally, each stage has a boss fight with some being out run sections with other evolving actual combat. The game unlocks new modes each time the game is completed, changing the design of the princess, title screen, and adding new challenges to the playthrough.

== Plot ==
Demon queen Lilith has seduced and kidnapped the king of Kaleiya. Princess Sarah embarks on a quest to destroy Lilith's forces and rescue her father.

== Reception ==
It took the game 10 days to be greenlit on Steam.

Alex Carlson of Hardcore Gamer gave the Windows version a score of 3/5, stating "underdog... competent, if uninspired indie platformer (...) Amazing Princess Sarah is well-worth five bucks if you love old-school gems like Castlevania but if you’re not into that classic retro scene, [it] will do as much to convince you of the genre’s flaws as it convinces you of its strengths."

Crystal Steltenpohl of Diehard GameFan wrote about the Xbox 360 version, "The (mostly) fun level design, interesting gameplay, and strong visuals bring together an experience that will remind you of older Metroidvania games while keeping it fresh. (...) The game is only $1. It's practically a steal. If you like these types of games, this is one I wouldn't recommend passing up on."

According to Rob Hamilton of HonestGamers, who gave it a 8/10 wrote "The game's not perfect, but thanks to its low asking price, it's a great way to enjoy a flashback to the games you may have enjoyed during your childhood."
