= Lilith (Lurianic Kabbalah) =

Demonic women in Jewish mysticism

In the teachings of Rabbi Isaac Luria, it is said that there are many Liliths. Manasseh Matlub Sithon said "many Liliths and demons are abroad, and go up and down."

The greatest of these is the wife of Adam Kadmon, a being that God used as an avatar to create the Universe in all its ten or more dimensions, hence a multiverse.

Another, more demonic Lilith, known as the woman of whoredom, is found in the Zohar book 1:5a. She is Samael (Satan)'s feminine counterpart.

The Lilith that most are familiar with is the wife of Adam in the Alphabet of Ben Sira (8th to 10th centuries CE), known as Adam haRishon, "the first man", among kabbalists.

There are mixed views of Lilith in the Zohar. In one account she is Samael's counterpart and a mother of demons. In another she is seen seducing the fallen angels as Naamah; the angels Azza and Azazael after they challenge the Shekhinah (the feminine dwelling presence of God) over the creation of man. This is alluded in the Zohar book 1 :19a-b, 23a-b, 27a-b respectively. When Lilith and Naamah (another aspect of Lilith) were with Adam in his 130-year separation from Eve after the fall, they had daughters born from their union. These were the nashiym, the liliyot(F), the liloth spirits who were the ones who seduced the Watchers. These daughters along with Lilith and Naamah are restored to Adam through the Wisdom of Solomon, the aspect of the Shekhinah, (referred to as the two prostitutes and the Nashiym in chapters 4 and 5 in the Zohar the Book of Concealment the Sifra di Tsniuta).

According to the translation of Rabbi Isaac Luria, Isaiah 34:14-15 means “The wild-cat shall meet with the jackals And the satyr shall cry to his fellow, Yea, Lilith shall repose there And find her a place of rest." From these passages rabbi Isaac Luria believed that Lilith was to be restored to Adam through the marriage of Leah to Jacob — Jacob was Adam, Leah was Lilith, and Rachel was Eve. It must be understood this one of many interpretations concerning the Zohar and of Lilith.

== See also ==
- Lilith
- Lurianic Kabbalah
