= Pinecraft, Florida =

Census-designated place in Florida

Pinecraft
- Census-designated place
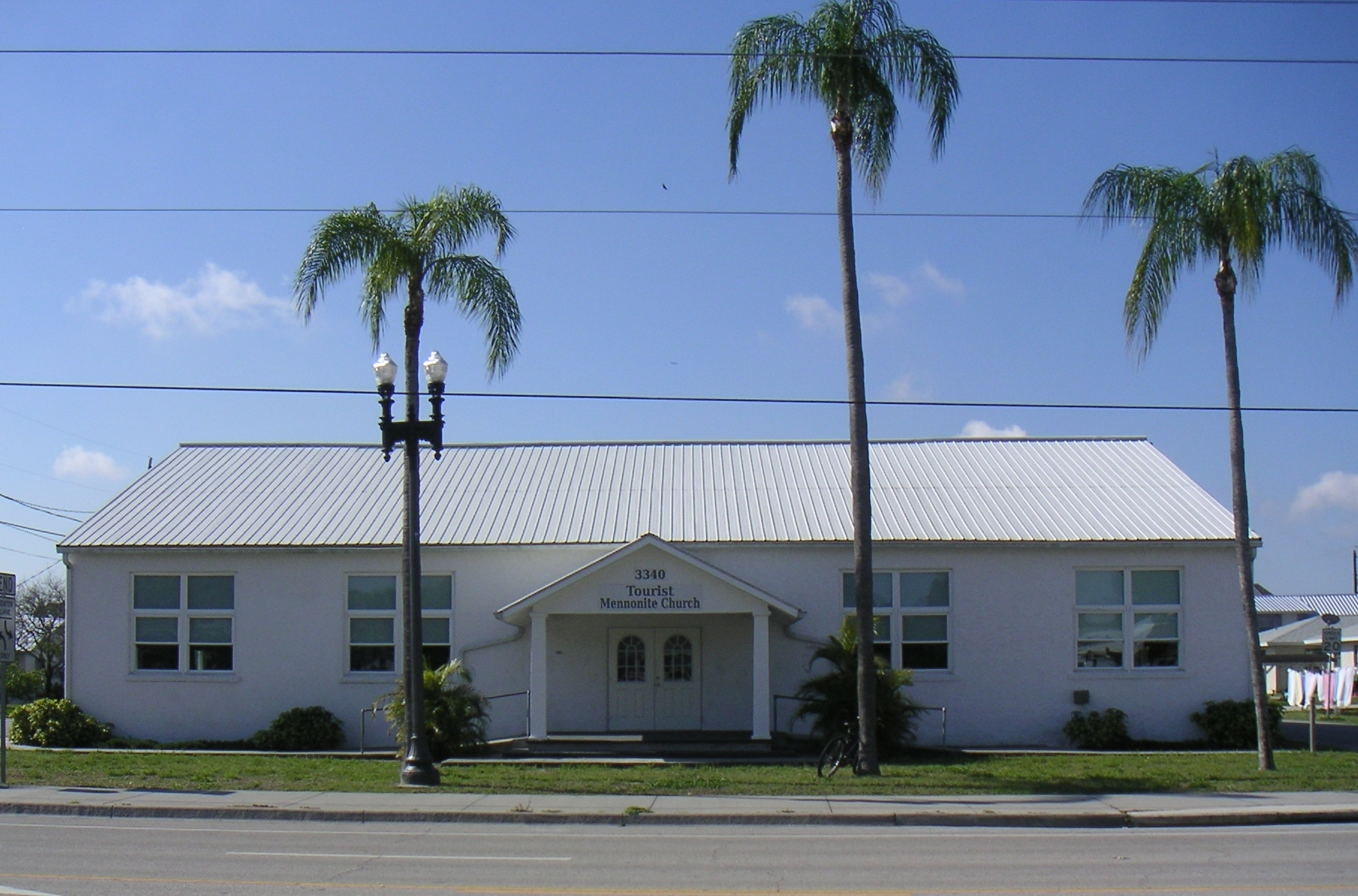
- Mennonite Tourist Church

- Location within the state of Florida
- Coordinates: 27°19′21″N 82°30′04″W
- Country: United States
- State: Florida
- County: Sarasota

Area
  - Total: 0.27 sq mi (0.69 km^{2})
  - Land: 0.26 sq mi (0.68 km^{2})
  - Water: 0.0039 sq mi (0.01 km^{2})
- Elevation: 13 ft (4.0 m)

Population (2020)
  - Total: 486
  - Density: 1,857.6/sq mi (717.23/km^{2})
- Time zone: UTC−05 (EST)
  - Summer (DST): UTC−04 (EDT)
- Area code: 941
- FIPS code: 12-56525
- GNIS feature ID: 2805188

Pinecraft is a census-designated place located in Sarasota County. The population was 486 at the 2020 census. It is part of the North Port-Bradenton-Sarasota, Florida Metropolitan Statistical Area. The neighborhood is a popular winter vacation spot for many North American Amish and Mennonites, particularly from Indiana, Ohio, and Pennsylvania.

== History ==
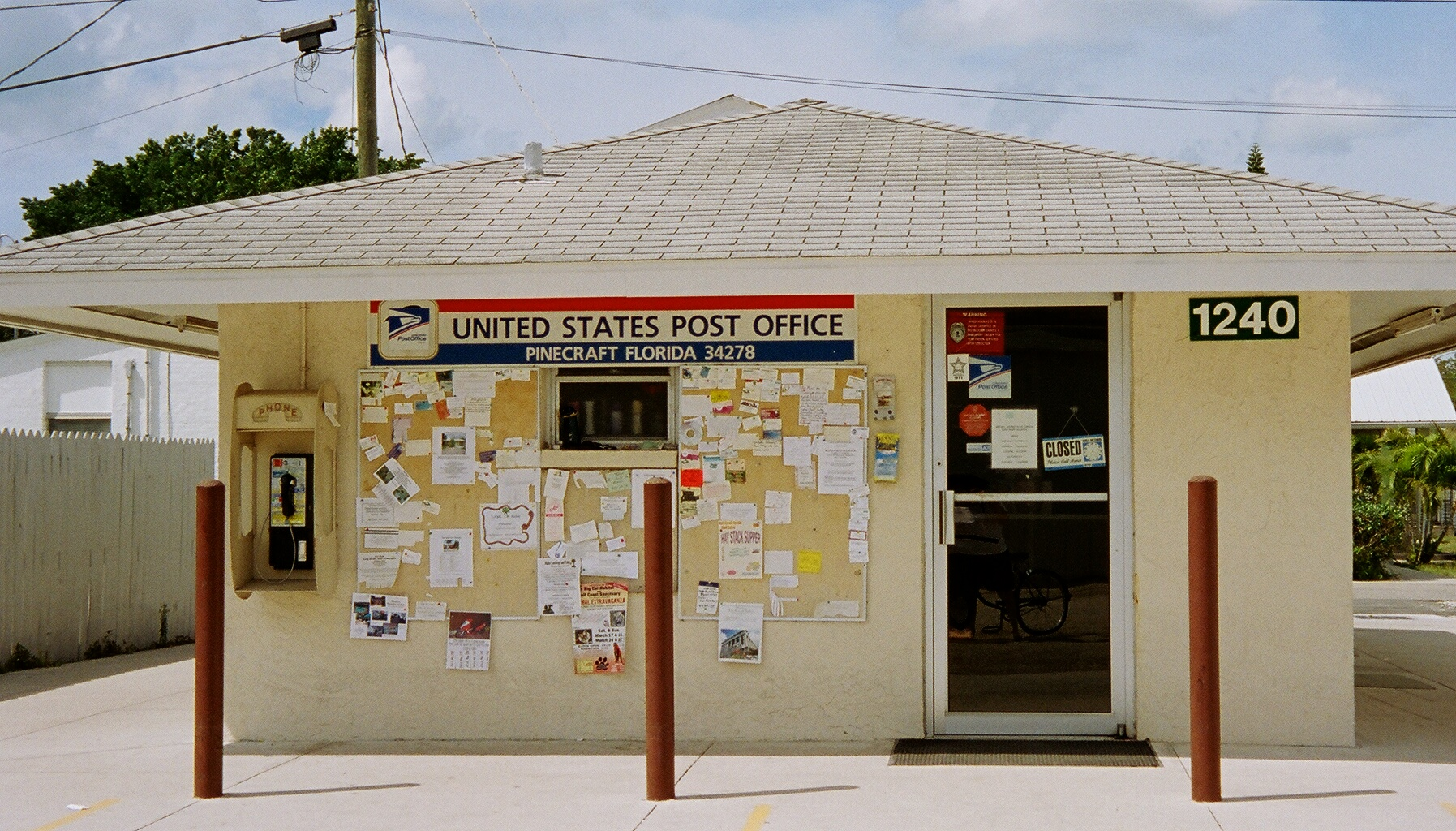
Pinecraft Post Office, closed in 2016

Historical population
Census	Pop.	Note	%±
2020	486		—
U.S. Decennial Census

"Pinecraft" became the new name in 1925-1926 in Sarasota National Tourist Camp, consisting at the time of 466 campsites, most of them 40 by 40 feet (12 m × 12 m) in size, with a small public park at the present site of Pinecraft Park, a community house, and a water tank. At that time, Pinecraft was about 1/2 square mile (1.3 km^{2}) in size, bounded on the north by Bahia Vista Street (Bay Vista Street), on the west by Phillippi Creek, on the south by Second Avenue South (roughly parallel with the current Schrock Street), and on the east by Yoder Street (at the time Eleventh Street, later Lee Drive).

Sometime after 1926, another tourist camp called Homecroft was laid out on adjacent property west and north of Pinecraft, which sometime after 1946 was incorporated into Pinecraft. Homecroft, about 1/4 mile by 1/2 mile in size, was bounded by Hacienda Street on the north, Yoder Street (then Lee Drive) on the west, Schrock Street (then Acacia Street) on the south, and Beneva Road (then Beneva Drive) on the east.

The transition from camps to residential areas occurred gradually, with major housing construction beginning in the early 1940s, continuing briskly through the 1940s and into the 1950s. The roads were paved around 1949–1950. In 1949 single lots at Pinecraft sold for $200, corner lots for $225.

== Mennonite and Amish churches ==
The Mennonite Tourist Church at 3340 Bahia Vista Avenue has been a landmark from the time it was purchased by Mennonites in 1946 for $7,500, equivalent to $124,000 in 2025. Prior to the purchase, the Kruppa bakery occupied the land. The church had attendance at the first Sunday services of 531 people. It was used by both Mennonites and Amish in separate services for a period of time. Starting in 1947 it was also used as a school for children vacationing in Florida, though by 1949 or 1950 the county built a school for Pinecraft children at the corner of Beneva Road and Bahia Vista Street. The Amish have a separate church located at 1325 Hines Avenue.

== Transportation ==
Amish from Indiana and Ohio travel to Pinecraft on buses of the Crossroad Tours company of Shipshewana, Indiana, and Pioneer Trails company of Millersburg, Ohio, which has "Florida Line Runs" all months except June and July. From Pennsylvania many Amish travel on buses of Elite Coach of Lancaster County, Pennsylvania, whose "Florida Line Run" has once-weekly journeys from January through March, and on those of Melard Coach, which provides transportation most weekends from late December through March. Both Elite Coach and Melard Coach provide service from multiple points in Lancaster County.

== Media ==
Season 2 of Breaking Amish, Breaking Amish: Brave New World, was filmed in Pinecraft. The season aired on television between May and July 2013. It was received with overall backlash from the community. One of the restaurant staples in Pinecraft, Der Dutchman, released a statement emphasizing that the corporate office didn't support the production. This release was given after the restaurant had already allowed filming within the restaurant.

== Education ==
The school district is Sarasota County Schools.

== Demographics ==
Pinecraft first appeared as a census designated place in the 2020 U.S. census.

== See also ==
- Sarasota Christian School, a Mennonite school in Sarasota

== Literature ==
- Stevick, Richard A. (2007). Growing Up Amish: the Teenage Years. Baltimore. pp. 120–124.
- Hostetler, John A. (1993). Amish Society. Baltimore. pp. 358–360.
