= Lilit Bleyan =

Armenian songwriter, singer

- Born: Lilit Bleyan; June 2, 1978 (age 47); Yerevan, Armenia
- Genres: soul, pop, jazz
- Occupations: Singer, songwriter
- Instrument: Vocals
- Years active: 2010–present
- Website: http://lilitbleyan.com/

Lilit Bleyan (Armenian: Լիլիթ Բլեյան; born 2 June 1978) is an Armenian singer-songwriter. She writes and performs songs in Armenian, Spanish and English. Her first album, “In another City,” was released in November 2011. A second album with primarily Spanish songs was released in November 2013.

== Biography ==
Born in Yerevan in 1978, her first songs were written when she could barely talk. She graduated from the class of violin of a musical school and at the age of 14 started singing in the chamber choir “Alan Hovhannes” in Yerevan. During her school years, she started learning Spanish independently after becoming attracted to some Spanish songs. This passion for languages led her to the Yerevan State University, where she graduated as a specialist in Spanish and English languages. During her university studies, she participated in musical events and shows as part of a duet with a friend. Still, music and songwriting continued as only hobbies in this period.

In parallel with university, Lilit graduated from TV journalism special courses and soon became one of the young faces of independent TV A1plus in Yerevan. She started as a journalist and went on to become a TV observer and news section editor and also made some individual projects for TV.

In 2010, she released a single in Armenian titled “Waiting Trains.” The song was an immediate success and led Lilit to think of recording a full album. This was realized in 2011 with her first album, which consisted of 9 acoustic songs in Armenian and Spanish. Soon, she decided to leave journalism and focus on songwriting and singing.

Her second album, consisting of primarily Spanish and English songs, was released on 19 November 2013.

== Discography ==
=== In Another City (2011) ===
1. Քաղաքից քաղաք – From Town to Town
2. Տրամադրություն - Mood
3. Սպասող գնացքներ – Waiting Trains
4. Երազելով ծովի մասին – Dreaming of the Sea
5. Մութ սենյակում – In a Dark Room
6. Սպասելով ամռանը – Waiting for the Summer
7. Հին հետքերով – Old Traces
8. Siempre tu' (իսպաներեն) - Siempre tu' (Spanish)
9. Սպասող գնացքներ (իսպաներեն) – Waiting Trains (Spanish version)

=== Paciencia (2013) ===
1. El corazón como prisión
2. Volverás
3. Por el Mediterráneo
4. Paciencia
5. Coloreando
6. Un Día
7. Una semana en Barcelona
8. Christmas Night
9. El Después
10. Castillo de arena
11. Falling
12. Siempre Tú (from the album “In another City”)
13. Christmas Night – Armenian version
