= The Ancient & Arcane =

Studio album by Varien
- Released: August 5, 2015
- Recorded: 2014–15
- Genres: Future bass; future house; swing house; glitch hop; trap; breakbeat
- Length: 29:47
- Label: Monstercat
- Producer: Nikki Kaelar

Varien chronology
Mirai Sekai (2014)	The Ancient & Arcane (2015)	My Prayers Have Become Ghosts (2016)

Singles from The Ancient & Arcane
- 1. "Supercell" Released: July 22, 2015; 2. "Hypnotique" Released: August 5, 2015

The Ancient & Arcane is the debut studio album by American electronic music producer Varien. The album was released on August 5, 2015, by independent electronic music label Monstercat.

== Background and composition ==
On July 22, 2015, Monstercat released Supercell, the first single from Kaelar's upcoming album, The Ancient & Arcane. The song was released alongside a music video featuring, as Matthew Meadow of Your EDM states, "A woman behind a computer screen, writing code, as she realizes that her code is sentient, personified by Varien himself".

In a Reddit AMA held on August 4, what happened to a psytrance song he was working on, in which Kaelar responded "That psy-trance thing ended up becoming the entire album idea for The Ancient & Arcane". Ryan Middleton of Music Times questioned Kaelar about his influences surrounding the album, which Kaelar responded:

Well, my love for video games exposed me to all genres at a super early age; the scoring in video games is actually a huge reason I got into music. As I learned theory, I realized that the only major difference between genres was instrumentation and arrangement, and that melodies can be carried to any genre and still work.

So keeping that in mind, you have to look at this album as essentially an amalgamation of all of my influences, with none being more important than the other.

When speaking about the album, Kaelar commented on the production process of The Ancient & Arcane, stating:

The Ancient & Arcane is really a free flowing amalgamation of influences and inspirations for me that I’ve held true for a long time. A lot of people will think this is a ‘reinvention of Varien’ when in reality, the genre-less nature of this album in whole is really what I’m all about.

== Reception and release ==
Matthew Meadow of Your EDM praised the single Supercell, stating "The beauty of this track is in the writing, production and arrangement, effortlessly conveying a deep message and dancey atmosphere" and described Kaelar's performance in the music video "blissfully enticing". Sean Reis of EDM Sauce stated "Featuring the beautiful vocals of Veela, Supercell was already a massive release, but now accompanied by such an in depth music video? Supercell and the rest of The Ancient & Arcane album are truly works of art!" Nick Pesavento of By The Waves stated "The entire song is dreamy and with the beautiful vocals, this track could weave a spell of calm over an audience with ease".

Jordan Diaz of Dancing Astronaut stated "Incorporating elements of Latin jazz, electro swing and Japanese future bass, among others, Varien emblazons his sonic finesse for his premiere full-length body of work". Alex Zimmerman of Only the Beat stated "Varien’s debut album The Ancient & Arcane takes it back to the days of meaningful, journey filled albums, mixing several genres, emotions and everything in between to create a one-of-a-kind album. Listen below and let your mind wander".

Paige Endykiewicz praised the album, stating:

The entire production of this LP is spellbinding and captivating to say the least. So much heart, soul and creativity was involved with the making of this release. I am truly thankful that Nick Pittsinger, known to most as Varien, is in existence to bring us all something that wanders so far outside of the EDM realm. All of the vocalists chosen did an outstanding job as well, bringing such amazing feelings into these songs. Congratulations Varien on such a well thought out, and well felt through masterpiece.

== Track listing ==
No.	Title	Length
1.	"The Ancient & Arcane"	2:43
2.	"Snowlight"	4:03
3.	"Supercell" (featuring Veela)	3:34
4.	"Transmissions from Lemuria"	3:37
5.	"Hypnotique" (featuring Charlotte Haining)	4:21
6.	"Firefly" (Intermission)	2:11
7.	"Kamisama" (featuring Miyoki)	4:09
8.	"Ghost Spores" (featuring Laura Brehm)	5:09
Total length:		29:47
