= M.A.V. (video game) =

MAV - Modular Assault Vehicle
- Developer: Bombdog Studios
- Publisher: Bombdog Studios
- Composer: Varien
- Engine: Unity
- Platform: Windows
- Genre: Mech simulator
- Modes: Single-player, multiplayer

Modular Assault Vehicle is a third-person shooter game created by American indie studio Bombdog studios as a spiritual successor to Chromehounds.

== Plot ==
The game is set in the near future, after a comet impacts with the Jovian moon Europa. A mining colony / terraforming colony is established on the now habitable moon to harvest resources to send back to a failing Earth. Due to the dire state of the planet Earth, the miners are quickly enslaved and forced into work camps. Eventually, these miners use the mining machines themselves to form a revolution.

== Gameplay ==
Gameplay has been said to be similar to Chromehounds, but with several modernizations and improvements. Limbs and weapons blow off when destroyed and tactical mistakes can be punishing.
