= Breaking Amish =

American reality television series

- Also known as: Breaking Amish: Brave New World; Breaking Amish: LA; Breaking Amish: Brooklyn
- Genre: Reality
- Country of origin: United States
- Original language: English
- No. of seasons: 4
- No. of episodes: 44

Production
- Running time: 44 minutes
- Production company: Hot Snakes Media

Original release
- Network: TLC
- Release: September 9, 2012 – November 20, 2014

Related
- Return to Amish

Breaking Amish is an American reality television series on the TLC television network that debuted September 9, 2012. The series revolves around five young Anabaptist adults (four Amish and one Mennonite) who move to New York City in order to experience a different life and decide whether to return to their communities or remain outside them and face ostracism by their families and friends. It follows the cast members as they experience life in New York and face new situations involving work, friendship, romance, and lifestyle, plus the drama that develops among cast members as they undergo various experiences.

The cast members' move to New York City differs from Rumspringa, the rite of passage in which some 16-year-old Amish are allowed to experience the outside world and to decide whether or not they wish to remain with their home communities.

A news report on February 25, 2013, stated that TLC had ordered a second season of Breaking Amish with the original cast. Breaking Amish: Brave New World is considered the second season by TLC.

A third season of Breaking Amish, entitled Breaking Amish: Los Angeles, debuted on July 21, 2013, with an entirely different cast. The only connections with the new cast and the original cast were Abe's brother Andrew Schmucker and Jeremiah's ex-girlfriend Iva being two of the main cast members.

A fourth and final season of the show entitled Breaking Amish: Brooklyn debuted on September 18, 2014, with a new cast as well. One of the cast members, Matt, would go on make appearances in the fifth season of the spinoff series Return to Amish.

== Controversy ==
It has been reported that the relationships between cast members were portrayed falsely and that there were many inconsistencies between fact and the reality that was represented in the television program. The production has been forthcoming with some of the 'non-Amish' activities in the background of the cast. As episodes progressed, the production steadily revealed other aspects of the cast's past activities, including items not previously released as spoilers by other media outlets.

Some of the information shared on air by the cast during the production:

=== Season 1 ===
- In episode 1 it is shown that Kate had spent time in Florida, driving and getting a DUI.
- In the extended version of episode 3 Jeremiah states that he was kicked out of the Amish three different times, dressing 'English' each time. ('English' was typically used in the series to mean "non-Anabaptist.")
- In episode 6 Jeremiah states, when Abe talks about marrying Rebecca, that he was once married.
- In episode 7 Abe and Rebecca discuss how they used to sneak off – with her boyfriend and with others – to dress 'English' and go bowling.
- In episode 7 Rebecca discusses how Abe once moved to Kentucky and she to North Dakota, renewing their friendship when they returned to their Amish community.
- In episode 8 Sabrina discusses the fact that she had been married, in 2009, to a Mennonite man – and that marrying a best friend does not always work out.
- In episode 10 Rebecca states that she had been married directly after her 18th birthday in 2009 and divorced in July 2012. She also mentions that she has a daughter.
- In episode 12 the group discuss the fact that many Amish teenagers will sneak out and dress 'English', and so it is no surprise to find pictures of them, or many other teenage Amish, during excursions outside of the community.

== Cast ==
=== Season 1 ===
Cast	Age^{1}	Details
Abe Schmucker	22	From Punxsutawney, Pennsylvania.
Jeremiah Raber	32	Adopted into an Amish community in Holmes County, Ohio.
Kate Stoltzfus	21	Daughter of a bishop, grew up in Lancaster, Pennsylvania, previously spent some time in Florida.
Rebecca Byler	20	From Punxsutawney, Pennsylvania.
Sabrina High	26	Adopted from Puerto Rico into a Mennonite community.

=== Season 2 ===
Cast	Age^{1}	Details
Rebecca Byler-Schmucker	21	From Punxsutawney, Pennsylvania. Has two daughters. Married Abe in the season finale of Breaking Amish.
Kate Stoltzfus	22	Daughter of a bishop, grew up in Lancaster, Pennsylvania, previously spent some time in Florida.
Abe Schmucker	23	From Punxsutawney, Pennsylvania. Married Rebecca on the season finale of Breaking Amish, and currently has two children with her.
Sabrina High	26	Adopted by a Mennonite family, born to Puerto Rican and Italian parents.
Jeremiah Raber	33	Adopted by an Amish family, grew up in Holmes County, Ohio.

Abe's mother Mary Schmucker, his little sister Katie Ann Schmucker and older brother Andy Schmucker are major recurring cast members this season ^Note 1: Age at the time of filming.

=== Season 3 ===
Cast	Age	Details
Betsy	21	Adopted into an Amish community in Holmes County, Ohio, recently married at the start of season.
Devon	21	From an Amish community in Shipshewana, Indiana.
Iva	19	From an Amish community in Lancaster, Pennsylvania. Appeared as an ex-girlfriend of Jeremiah in previous seasons.
Lizzie	21	From an Amish community in Lancaster, Pennsylvania. Sister of Samuel. Pregnant at the start of season.
Matthew	24	From a Mennonite community in East Earl, Pennsylvania.
Samuel	26	From an Amish community in Lancaster, Pennsylvania. Brother of Lizzie.

Iva's boyfriend Sam is a recurring cast member this season ^Note 1: Age at the time of filming.

=== Season 4 ===
Cast	Age	Details
Barbie	22	From an Amish community in Munfordville, Kentucky.
Bates	21	From an Amish community in Orwell, Ohio.
Matt	22	Adopted from Bulgaria into an Amish community in Winesburg, Ohio. Married to a Mennonite woman who is pregnant at start of the season.
Miriam	26	From an Amish community in Middlefield, Ohio. Has an 8 year old son with an English ex.
Vonda	29	From an Amish community in Middlebury, Indiana.

Matt's wife Courtney and her mother Venus are recurring cast members this season ^Note 1: Age at the time of filming.

== Episodes ==
Season	Episodes	Originally released	
Season	Episodes	First released	Last released
1	12	September 9, 2012	November 18, 2012
2	10	May 12, 2013	July 14, 2013
3	12	July 21, 2013	September 29, 2013
4	10	September 18, 2014	November 20, 2014

=== Season 1 (2012) ===
No. overall	No. in season	Title	Original release date	U.S. viewers (millions)
1	1	"Jumping the Fence"	September 9, 2012	3.09
The premiere of a reality series following five men and women from Amish and Mennonite communities as they seek the possibility of leaving their old lives behind for new ones in New York City, though they also run the risk of saying good-bye to their family and friends forever.
2	2	"What Have We Gotten Ourselves Into?"	September 16, 2012	2.88
The Amish find themselves in chaotic and vibrant New York City. Romance may be in the offing as the newcomers adjust to life in New York City, but their fresh start also comes with an air of tension.
3	3	"Breaking All the Rules"	September 23, 2012	2.78
The cast breaks Amish & Mennonite rules by buying "English" clothes and getting tattoos. The cast grows more comfortable in the city when they get wardrobe makeovers and tattoos, and Kate and Rebecca mull modeling careers, but surprise visits by Abe's and Rebecca's families could put an end to this experiment. Also, Jeremiah has his first driving lesson.
4	4	"New Beginnings"	September 30, 2012	3.00
Rebecca confronts a difficult episode from her past. Kate succumbs to the pressure of being shunned by her family. Sabrina tries to find out more about her ethnic background. Jeremiah continues his driving lessons with a different instructor.
5	5	"What Is Really Happening?"	October 7, 2012	2.43
The cast discusses the pros and cons of the Amish life. Abe accompanies Jeremiah to a strip club. Rebecca uncovers Kate's Florida DUI arrest record which Kate must confront. Sabrina continues to look towards exploring her ethnic background.
6	6	"Good vs. Evil"	October 14, 2012	3.21
Kate wears a bikini for her first photo shoot. Abe wants to take his relationship with Rebecca a step further. Sabrina, along with Kate, Abe and Rebecca visit the Museum of Sex.
7	7	"Final Days"	October 21, 2012	3.38
Kate finds she is ousted from the others. Sabrina learns the whereabouts of her biological father, though she and Jeremiah keep a secret from the rest. Rebecca reveals a part of her past that she is not really in the mood to discuss. The cast makes a tough decision while packing their bags.
8	8	"Decision Time"	October 28, 2012	3.87
The men and women go home to decide whether they will return to their communities or leave them behind for a new life, which may mean saying good-bye to their families and friends forever.
9	9	"Party Time"	November 4, 2012	3.33
Sabrina uncovers her late birth mother's letters. Kate begins to accept the reality of her situation. Abe and Rebecca plan their eventual wedding. Jeremiah and Sabrina plan bachelor and bachelorette parties respectively for the engaged.
10	10	"Finale"	November 11, 2012	3.80
Cast members' tempers flare following pre-wedding parties. Abe and Rebecca get frustrated on wedding plans. Jeremiah is curious of how Sabrina feels about their relationship.
11	11	"The Shunning Truth — Part 1"	November 11, 2012	3.88
Michelle Beadle hosts as the cast reunites to discuss their first time in NYC, and even relates to relationships with their families and friends, their possible brushes with the law and the authenticity of their Amish or Mennonite lives.
12	12	"The Shunning Truth — Part 2"	November 18, 2012	3.06
Michelle Beadle hosts as the cast continues to speak about their lives, their cultural origins and the rumors and allegations that need to be addressed.

=== Season 2: Brave New World (2013) ===
A subtitle is added to this season entitled: Brave New World. All of the cast members from the first season return as they relocate and reside in Pinecraft, a small neighborhood located within Sarasota, Florida where there is a community of ex-Amish and Amish.

No. overall	No. in season	Title	Original release date	U.S. viewers (millions)
13	1	"Nothing to Lose"	May 12, 2013	2.14
Abe, Jeremiah, Rebecca, Sabrina, and Kate have all had a difficult time adjusting to their new lives since leaving the Amish and Mennonite communities. Jeremiah hatches a plan to get the gang back together and give them all a chance at redemption.
14	2	"Shunned & on the Run"	May 19, 2013	1.87
The group reunites for the first time since leaving New York, but they are not prepared for life on the road in close quarters. Meanwhile, when the Bishop shows up unannounced back in Punxy, Abe's mother Mary is faced with the most difficult decision of her life.
15	3	"Facing Demons"	May 26, 2013	1.63
The cast has great expectations when they finally make it down to Florida, but there's trouble in paradise.Jeremiah's surprise visitor has an ulterior motive for showing up, and Kate comes to Sabrina's rescue when she gets caught in the middle
16	4	"Flirting With Disaster"	June 2, 2013	2.34
Lingering sexual tension between Sabrina and Jeremiah raises some eyebrows, and the heat is on when Sabrina has a sudden confrontation with his ex. Hope for a fresh start in Florida takes a turn when unexpected and unwanted guests come knocking.
17	5	"What's the Beef?"	June 9, 2013	1.89
Sabrina gets a call from a private investigator with surprising new information about her biological family. Abe chases his dream of becoming a professional bull rider and Jeremiah faces the consequences of his illicit affair.
18	6	"Forbidden Fruit"	June 16, 2013	1.70
A surprise modeling gig in Miami offers Kate an escape from the others, or so she thinks. Katie Ann has a surprise of her own in store for Mary and a big decision about her future. Jeremiah discovers footage of Kate that leaves everyone in shock.
19	7	"Devil in a Red Dress"	June 23, 2013	2.15
Sparks fly when Katie Ann decides to get an "English" makeover and picks Kate over Abe and Rebecca to go with her. Sabrina tries to find her long lost family, and herself, in Puerto Rico with Jeremiah along for the ride. Abe finally goes bull riding.
20	8	"A Brother's Secret"	June 30, 2013	2.07
In the season finale Jeremiah comes back from Puerto Rico with a heavy heart and Sabrina makes a surprising decision about her future. An unexpected visitor from home shows up to check on Mary and Katie Ann. And the group finally make decisions about what's next.
21	9	"The Shunning Truth — Part 1"	July 7, 2013	2.38
The cast gather for a two-part reunion special and ready to set the record straight in this explosive two-part reunion special hosted by NBC's Michelle Beadle. Plus sparks fly when the cast is brought face to face with two mystery guests.
22	10	"The Shunning Truth — Part 2"	July 14, 2013	2.07
In part two of the reunion special host Michelle Beadle dives deeper into the complicated relationships the cast has with each other, their own families, and two surprise guests. Tensions rise as more shocking secrets are revealed.

=== Season 3: Los Angeles (2013) ===
No. overall	No. in season	Title	Original release date	U.S. viewers (millions)
23	1	"Family Secrets"	July 21, 2013	N/A
We meet a new group of Amish and Mennonite young adults, Matt, Devon, Iva, Betsy, and Lizzie, who are prepared to start new lives in the English world.
24	2	"Exodus"	July 28, 2013	N/A
The cast heads to Los Angeles and tries to start a new journey for themselves. Lizzie realizes she has to come out with the truth that she is pregnant.
25	3	"Black Sheep"	August 4, 2013	N/A
Lizzie's brother Sam comes by demanding to see her and his attitude causes everyone else to mind their own business. Andrew Schmucker makes his debut to the house and doesn't give a friendly welcome which already causes the others to find him as a problem.
26	4	"Metamorphosis"	August 11, 2013	N/A
The group undergoes a make-over to transition from their Amish appearance to an English one. Betsy's behavior begins to spiral out of control.
27	5	"Exile"	August 18, 2013	N/A
Betsy is confronted by her bad actions that happened one night that no one else realized. Iva is distraught and is relieved when her fiance Sam comes by to make her happy, but is told even more surprising news. In the midst of the drama, the group decides to go to Las Vegas to have fun.
28	6	"Sin City"	August 25, 2013	N/A
While in Las Vegas, Matt is afraid of getting into bad habits that could ruin his good character. Betsy is on the verge of revealing secrets that could destroy the relationship between all of the cast members.
29	7	"Judgment Day"	September 1, 2013	N/A
When Iva's fiance Sam bids the others a farewell, tensions build up among them. Matt interns for a fashion designer. When a baby shower for Lizzie is made, it is nearly ruined by Devon's mischievous behavior.
30	8	"Into the Fire"	September 8, 2013	N/A
After Devon is rejected from the house, Matt goes to preach about forgiving others to a crowd of skeptics. Betsy discovers some news from a genealogist that leads to her traveling to Mexico. Matt tries to hold it together in his first fashion industry presentation.
31	9	"Paradise Lost"	September 15, 2013	N/A
The group travels back home from Los Angeles. Matt has a conflict with his parents. Andrew goes to visit his mother. Lizzie finally goes into labor and her baby's father makes a visit to support her through the painful moment.
32	10	"Cast Off"	September 22, 2013	N/A
Sam does not like Lizzie's choices and goes to confront her baby's father. Andrew has to deal with his probation officer making sure he's not getting into trouble. Matt hosts a get-together for the group and tensions flare.
33	11	"Redemption"	September 29, 2013	N/A
Sam makes a confession to Betsy on behalf of what went down in Los Angeles and has to deal with the consequences. Matt discovers that there is a warrant out for his arrest. The cast go to see Lizzie's baby and are shocked to see that the father is black.
34	12	"The Shunning Truth"	September 29, 2013	N/A
The cast members gather together with Michelle Beadle in a reunion special to journey back over the course of the season and get to the bottom of some relationship and drama issues.

=== Season 4: Brooklyn (2014) ===
No. overall	No. in season	Title	Original release date	U.S. viewers (millions)
35	1	"Road Not Taken"	September 18, 2014	N/A
We are introduced to Barbie, Bates, Vonda, Miriam, and Matt in their hometowns as they prepare to leave for Brooklyn.
36	2	"On The Run"	September 25, 2014	N/A
The group meets each other and makes their way to New York for the first time.
37	3	"Bright Lights, Big Sinners"	October 2, 2014	N/A
As they explore New York, flirtation begins for some of the cast, despite existing relationships.
38	4	"House Divided"	October 9, 2014	N/A
After a romantic encounter with Miriam, Matt must come clean to his housemates about being married. Meanwhile, Vonda gets troubling news from home while the group learns about Matt's Bulgarian roots.
39	5	"Forgive And Forget"	October 16, 2014	N/A
Matt's wife Courtney and her mother Venus are in Brooklyn seeking details about what happened between Matt and Miriam. Bates tries his hand at being a tour guide, and Vonda attempts online dating.
40	6	"Out With The Old"	October 23, 2014	N/A
Miriam's sister and son arrive in New York for a visit and she leaves with them when they return home. Matt is confused about his marriage while Bates faces relationship problems. Vonda, Barbie, Matt, and Bates get English makeovers.
41	7	"Make Things Right"	October 30, 2014	N/A
The boys head back home to figure out their respective relationships. Matt and Courtney have a 'counseling' session with Venus. Bates checks in with Miriam and convinces her to return to New York with him.
42	8	"What Tomorrow May Bring"	November 6, 2014	N/A
The cast pursues their passions: Miriam heads to a construction site, Bates takes an improv class, and Matt prepared to jam with a bar band. Miriam gets a makeover and returns home to be with her son.
43	9	"Seizing The Moment"	November 13, 2014	N/A
Bates gets a concerning message from his ex-girlfriend. Vonda goes out with her dance instructor. Matt plays with a band to Venus' dismay.
44	10	"Light At The End Of The Day"	November 20, 2014	N/A
The group struggles with returning Amish or staying in the English world.

== See also ==
- Amish in the City
- Return to Amish
