= Tornado outbreak of February 24−25, 1961 =

Destructive outbreak of tornadoes

Meteorological history
- Duration: February 24−25, 1961

Tornado outbreak
- Tornadoes: 14
- Max. rating: F2 tornado
- Duration: 22 hours and 20 minutes
- Highest winds: 97 mph (156 km/h); Ardmore
- Largest hail: 1.75 in (4.4 cm); Watson, Louisiana

Overall effects
- Casualties: 11 injuries
- Damage: $460,030 (1961 USD)
- Areas affected: Southeastern United States
- Part of the tornado outbreaks of 1961

A destructive outbreak of 14 tornadoes hit the Southeast. Seven of the 14 tornadoes were significant (F2+) and multiple populated areas were struck. Overall, the outbreak injured 11 and caused $460,030 (1961 USD) in damage.

== Confirmed tornadoes ==
Confirmed tornadoes by Fujita rating
FU	F0	F1	F2	F3	F4	F5	Total
0	1	6	7	0	0	0	14

=== February 24 event ===
List of confirmed tornadoes – Friday, February 24, 1961 (Note: All dates are based on the local time zone where the tornado touched down; however, all times are in Coordinated Universal Time and dates are split at midnight CST/CDT for consistency.) (Note: Prior to 1994, only the average widths of tornado paths were officially listed.)
F#	Location	County / Parish	State	Start coord.	Time (UTC)	Path length	Max. width	Summary
F2	W of Pinehurst to SW of Unadilla	Dooly	GA	32.20°N 83.83°W	19:40–?	4.9 miles (7.9 km)	200 yards (180 m)	Tornado moved through mostly rural areas, ending south-southeast of Snow Spring. Three homes and two barns were destroyed and trees and utility lines were downed. Damage was estimated $25,000.
F2	Lizella to W of West Oak	Bibb	GA	32.80°N 83.82°W	20:30–?	3.8 miles (6.1 km)	30 yards (27 m)	A tornado moved through Lizella, destroying one house and damaging two others. Losses totaled $25,000.
F2	Danville/Allentown	Twiggs	GA	32.60°N 83.25°W	20:30–?	1 mile (1.6 km)	50 yards (46 m)	Tornado struck Danville and Allentown, damaging several residencies and outhouses and uprooting trees. There was $25,000 in damage.
F2	Ararat to Milan	Chauncey	GA	32.08°N 83.13°W	21:45–?	0.5 miles (0.80 km)	600 yards (550 m)	Short-lived, but large tornado moved through Ararat, blowing the roofs off of five houses and causing $25,000 in damage.
F2	Hurtsboro to Hatchechubbee to Seale to Flournoys	Russell	AL	32.23°N 85.40°W	22:30–?	25.6 miles (41.2 km)	10 yards (9.1 m)	See section on this tornado – Four people were injured and losses totaled $25,000.
F1	Jackson to Savannah River Site	Aiken	SC	33.32°N 81.78°W	23:30–?	0.5 miles (0.80 km)	60 yards (55 m)	A tornado moved through Jackson, causing heavy damage in a trailer camp. Five people were injured, two of which were hospitalized, and damages were estimated at $25,000 in damage. The tornado did not have a visible condensation funnel.
F1	McBean	Richmond	GA	33.25°N 81.95°W	23:30–?	1 mile (1.6 km)	100 yards (91 m)	Tornado demolished a post office and damaged two homes, causing $25,000 in damage.
F1	New Ellenton	Aiken	SC	33.42°N 81.68°W	00:00–?	0.5 miles (0.80 km)	50 yards (46 m)	Tornado may have come from the same cell that formed the Jackson tornado. The area struck was sparsely populated, but losses still reached $2,500. Two people were injured. The tornado did not have a visible condensation funnel.
F2	Western Butler	Taylor	GA	32.55°N 84.25°W	00:45–?	2 miles (3.2 km)	30 yards (27 m)	Destructive tornado moved through the west side of Butler, damaging 10 homes and causing $25,000 in damage.
F0	Woodford	Orangeburg	SC	33.67°N 81.12°W	01:00–?	0.5 miles (0.80 km)	37 yards (34 m)	A brief, weak tornado caused $30 in damage in Woodford.

=== February 25 event ===
List of confirmed tornadoes – Saturday, February 25, 1961
F#	Location	County / Parish	State	Start coord.	Time (UTC)	Path length	Max. width	Summary	Refs.
F1	Egypt Lake-Leto	Hillsborough	FL	28.00°N 82.50°W	14:00–?	0.3 miles (0.48 km)	50 yards (46 m)	A brief tornado caused $2,500 in damage in Northwestern Tampa. A large building was unroofed near the Tampa International Airport, but that was listed as a strong wind event.	
F1	Holden Heights	Orange	FL	28.50°N 81.40°W	15:45–?	0.1 miles (0.16 km)	10 yards (9.1 m)	A brief tornado hit Southwestern Orlando, causing $2,500 in damage.	
F1	SE of Piney Wood	Pender	NC	34.55°N 78.08°W	17:06–?	0.1 miles (0.16 km)	10 yards (9.1 m)	A brief tornado touched down just southeast of Piney Wood, where a farm building was shifted 60 feet off its foundation. Damages was estimated at $2,500.	
F2	Oak Hill	Fayette	WV	37.98°N 81.15°W	18:00–?	3 miles (4.8 km)	100 yards (91 m)	Strong tornado struck Oak Hill. Rosedale Elementary School was obliterated, roofs and antennas were ripped off houses, and large trees were uprooted. One small house was shifted off its foundation and telephone and electric power services were disrupted. Damage was estimated at $250,000. Multiple towns may have been hit, but the exact track of the tornado is unknown. The tornado was very unusual as it was followed almost immediately by a snowstorm that bought 4 to 6 in (10 to 15 cm) of snow to the area.	

=== Hurtsboro–Hatchechubbee–Seale–Flournoys, Alabama ===
Hurtsboro–Hatchechubbee–Seale–Flournoys, Alabama
F2 tornado
- on the Fujita scale

Overall effects
- Injuries: 4
- Damage: $25,000 (1961 USD)
- Areas affected: East-Central Alabama

This strong F2 tornado first touched down in Hurtsboro and moved east-northeast. It hit Southern Wende, before moving directly through the town Hatchechubbee, which was heavily damaged. It then hit Northern Colbert before moving through Seale, which was also heavily damaged. The tornado then struck Southern Lato before striking Nuckols, again causing heavy damage. The tornado then crossed over Lake Bickerstaff and dissipated in Flournoys. Although it moved mostly through rural areas, the tornado left several homes obliterated while others were heavily damaged and many trees were blown down or broken off. Four people were injured and damage estimates totaled $25,000. The NWS Birmingham list the tornado's maximum width as 100 yd (91 m).

== Non-tornadic impacts ==
The only report of hail from this event came out of Watson, Louisiana on February 24, where golf-ball sized hail was confirmed. Strong winds were much more common during the event. February 25 saw a wind gust of 97 mph (156 km/h) was recorded just southwest of Winston-Salem, North Carolina in the suburb Ardmore. A 85 miles per hour (137 km/h) wind gust was also recorded in Edgewood in Roanoke, Virginia.

== See also ==
- List of North American tornadoes and tornado outbreaks
- Tornado outbreak of February 23–24, 2016
