= Georgia State Route 230 =

State highway in Georgia, United States

State Route 230
- SR 230 highlighted in red

Route information
- Maintained by GDOT
- Length: 59.2 mi (95.3 km)
- Existed: 1944–present

Major junctions
- West end: SR 27 west-southwest of Vienna
- I-75 / US 41 / SR 7 in Unadilla; US 129 / US 341 / SR 11 / US 129 Alt. / US 341 Bus. in Hawkinsville
- East end: SR 87 east-northeast of Abbeville

Location
- Country: United States
- State: Georgia
- Counties: Dooly, Pulaski, Dodge

Highway system
- Georgia State Highway System; Interstate; US; State; Special
← SR 229	→ SR 231

State Route 230 (SR 230) is a 59.2-mile-long (95.3 km) west–east state highway in the central part of the U.S. state of Georgia. It travels in a northern arc through portions of Dooly, Pulaski, and Dodge counties.

== Route description ==
SR 230 begins at an intersection with SR 27 in the unincorporated community of Drayton, which is in southwestern Dooly County and west of Vienna. Here, the roadway continues as River Road. This was a former section of SR 230. It heads northwest along River Road, crossing Turkey Creek, until it turns northeast. Here, the "River Road" name continues to the northwest. SR 230 continues to the northeast until it reaches Byromville, where it has a brief concurrency with SR 90. It continues heading northeast, before heading east to its intersection with SR 329 northeast of the unincorporated community of Snow Spring, which is west of Unadilla. In Unadilla is an interchange with Interstate 75 (I-75) and a very brief concurrency with US 41/SR 7. East of Unadilla, the road crosses into Pulaski County. Then, it enters Hawkinsville. It has an intersection with US 129/US 341/SR 11, which begins a concurrency with all three. Farther east is an intersection with SR 27/SR 257, which both join the concurrency. A short distance later is an intersection with US 129/US 129 Alternate/SR 11/SR 11 Business/SR 112, where US 129/SR 11 leave the concurrency to the south. Just before crossing the Ocmulgee River is an intersection with US 341 Business/SR 26, where SR 26 joins the concurrency. Shortly after crossing the river, this major concurrency meets its eastern end. US 129 Alternate/SR 26/SR 112/SR 257 head to the northeast, US 341/SR 27 continue to the east, and SR 230 departs to the southeast. Farther to the southeast, SR 230 enters Dodge County. About 6 miles (9.7 km) after the county line, it meets its eastern terminus, an intersection with SR 87.

The section that is concurrent with US 341 is the only section of SR 230 that is part of the National Highway System, a system of routes determined to be the most important for the nation's economy, mobility and defense.

== History ==
SR 230 was established in 1944 along an alignment from SR 90 in Byromville to US 41/SR 7 in Unadilla. In 1950, this original section was paved. By 1960, the road's western terminus was extended to an intersection with US 280/SR 30 southeast of its current western terminus, and its eastern terminus was extended along its current alignment to its current eastern terminus. It was paved from a point about 4 miles (6.4 km) southeast of Byromville to the Pulaski-Dodge county line. and by 1963, the section within Dodge County was paved. By 1966, it was completely paved from Drayton to its eastern terminus. By 1977, the section between US 280/SR 30 and SR 27 was decommissioned.

== Major intersections ==
County	Location	mi	km	Destinations	Notes
Dooly	Drayton	0.0	0.0	SR 27 – Americus, Vienna	Western terminus; roadway continues as River Road.
Dooly	Byromville	9.6	15.4	SR 90 west – Montezuma	Western end of SR 90 concurrency
Dooly	Byromville	9.7	15.6	SR 90 east – Vienna	Eastern end of SR 90 concurrency
Dooly		19.3	31.1	SR 329 west – Montezuma	Eastern terminus of SR 329
Dooly	Unadilla	20.8	33.5	I-75 (SR 401) – Valdosta, Macon	I-75 exit 122
Dooly	Unadilla	21.6	34.8	US 41 south / SR 7 south (Pine Street)	Western end of US 41/SR 7 concurrency
Dooly	Unadilla	21.6	34.8	US 41 north / SR 7 north (Pine Street)	Eastern end of US 41/SR 7 concurrency
Pulaski	Hawkinsville	38.6	62.1	US 129 north / US 341 west / SR 11 north (341st Boulevard)	Western end of US 129/SR 11 and US 341 concurrencies
Pulaski	Hawkinsville	39.0	62.8	SR 27 west / SR 257 west (Mc Cormick Avenue)	Western end of SR 27/SR 257 concurrency
Pulaski	Hawkinsville	39.3	63.2	US 129 south / SR 11 south / SR 112 south / US 129 Alt. north / SR 11 Bus. north (Jackson Street South) – Abbeville, Rochelle	Eastern end of US 129/SR 11 concurrency; western end of US 129 Alt./SR 112 concurrency
Pulaski	Hawkinsville	39.5	63.6	US 341 Bus. north / SR 26 west	Western end of SR 26 concurrency; eastern terminus of US 341 Bus.
Pulaski		40.2	64.7	US 129 Alt. north / SR 26 east / SR 112 north / SR 257 east / US 341 south / SR 27 east (Eastman Highway) – Cochran, Eastman	Eastern end of US 129 Alt./SR 26/SR 112/SR 257 and US 341/SR 27 concurrencies
Dodge		59.2	95.3	SR 87 (Abbeville Highway) – Eastman	Eastern terminus
1.000 mi = 1.609 km; 1.000 km = 0.621 mi: Concurrency terminus
