= Georgia State Route 329 =

Highway in Georgia, United States

State Route 329
- SR 329 highlighted in red

Route information
- Maintained by GDOT
- Length: 9.5 mi (15.3 km)
- Existed: June 1, 1963–present

Major junctions
- West end: SR 26 east of Montezuma
- East end: SR 230 west of Unadilla

Location
- Country: United States
- State: Georgia
- Counties: Macon, Dooly, Houston

Highway system
- Georgia State Highway System; Interstate; US; State; Special
← SR 328	→ SR 330

State Route 329 (SR 329) is a 9.5-mile-long (15.3 km) east-to-west state highway in the central part of the U.S. state of Georgia. It travels within portions of Macon and Dooly counties, with a portion along the Dooly–Macon county line and the Dooly–Houston county line.

== Route description ==
SR 329 begins at an intersection with SR 26 east of Montezuma (and just west of Five Points in Macon County. It travels east, through Five Points, and then travels along the Dooly–Macon county line. Just over 2,000 feet (610 m) after Mims Road, it begins to travel along the Dooly–Houston county line. Just before intersecting the western terminus of County Line Road, it begins to curve to the southeast and enters Dooly County proper. After traveling through Emerich and intersecting the eastern terminus of Leavens Road, it curves back to the east and meets its eastern terminus, an intersection with SR 230 west of Unadilla (and northeast of Snow Spring.

SR 329 is not part of the National Highway System, a system of roadways important to the nation's economy, defense, and mobility.

== History ==
SR 329 was built in the early 1960s on an alignment that was farther to the north than it travels today. It began at SR 26 and traveled to the east to the intersection with County Line Road northwest of Emerich, where it does today. There, it followed County Line Road along the Dooly–Houston county line until it intersected US 41/SR 7, north-northwest of Unadilla. Also, the Macon County portion was paved. In 1970, the highway was re-routed along its current path.

== Major intersections ==
County	Location	mi	km	Destinations	Notes
Macon		0.0	0.0	SR 26 – Montezuma, Henderson	Western terminus
Dooly–Macon	No major junctions				
Dooly–Houston	No major junctions				
Dooly		9.5	15.3	SR 230 – Byromville, Unadilla	Eastern terminus
1.000 mi = 1.609 km; 1.000 km = 0.621 mi
