= Akin House =

Akin House may refer to:

- Elihu Akin House - Historic house in Dartmouth, Massachusetts
- Daniel F. Akin House - Historic house in Farmington, Minnesota
- Mrs. Henry F. Akin House - Historic house in Maywood, Illinois
- Leonard–Akin House - Historic house in Vienna, Georgia
