= Dooly County School District =

School district in Georgia (U.S. state)

Address
- 202 Cotton St Vienna, Georgia, 31092-1550; United States
- Coordinates: 32.09031°N 83.793002°W

District information
- Grades: Pre-school - 12
- Superintendent: Craig Lockhart
- Accreditations: Southern Association of Colleges and Schools; Georgia Accrediting Commission

Students and staff
- Enrollment: 1,545
- Faculty: 92

Other information
- Telephone: (229) 268-4761
- Fax: (229) 268-6148
- Website: dooly.k12.ga.us

Dooly County High School

Location
- 713 North 3rd Street; Vienna, (Dooly County), Georgia 31092; United States

Information
- Type: Public high school
- Principal: Dr. Rodney McBride
- Staff: 25.00 (FTE)
- Enrollment: 347 (2023-24)
- Student to teacher ratio: 13.88
- Colors: Red and gold
- Nickname: Bobcats
- Website: Dooly County High School

Dooly County School District is a public school district in Dooly County, Georgia, United States, based in Vienna. It serves the communities of Byromville, Dooling, Lilly, Pinehurst, Unadilla, and Vienna.

== Schools ==
The Dooly County School District has one elementary school, one middle school, and one high school.

=== Elementary school ===
- Dooly County K-8 Academy

=== Middle school ===
- Dooly County K-8 Academy

=== High school ===
- Dooly County High School
