= Vienna High and Industrial School =

American high school

- Vienna High and Industrial School; Georgia SP Vienna High and Industrial School
- U.S. National Register of Historic Places
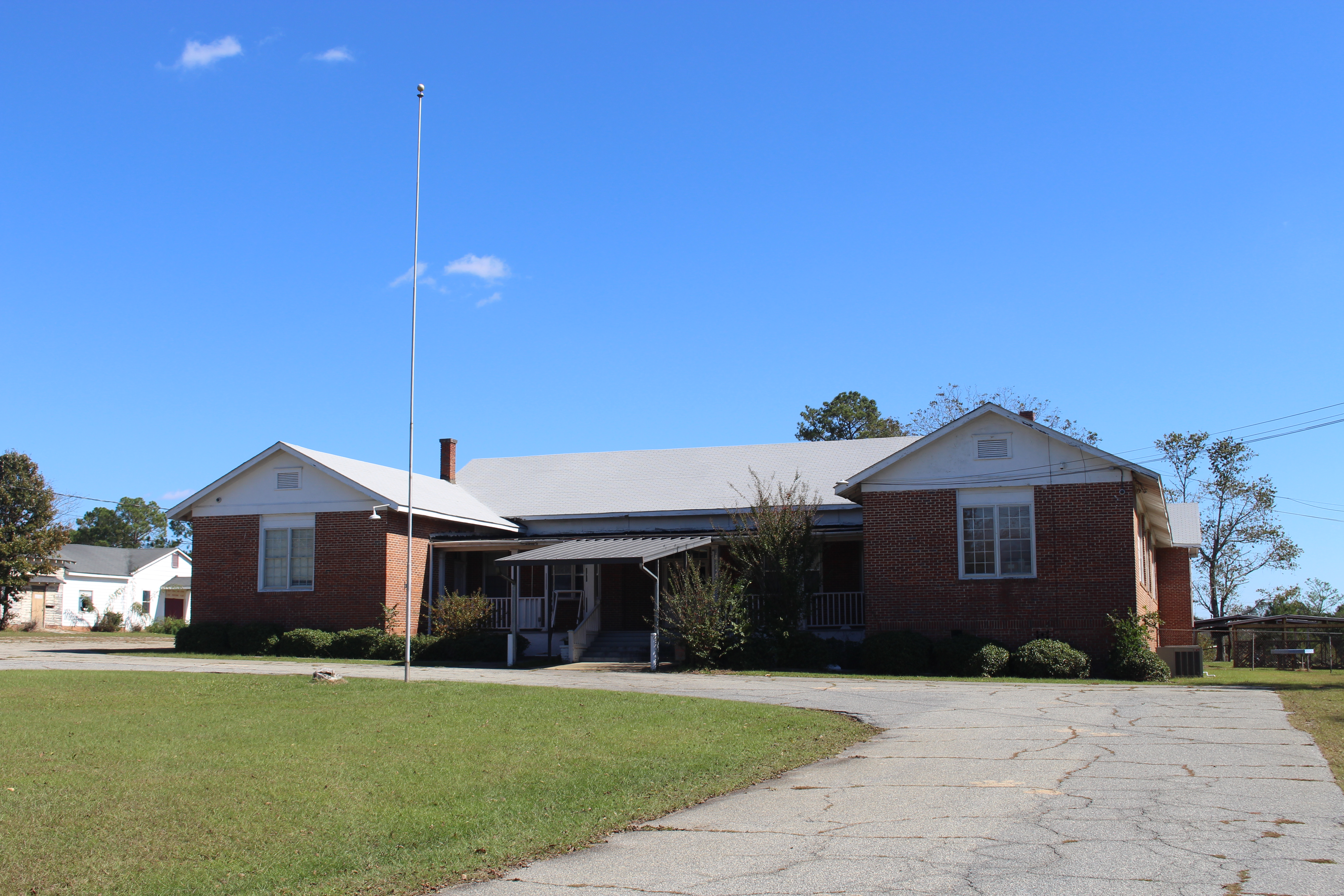
- Location: 216 9th Street, Vienna, Dooly County, Georgia, U.S.
- Coordinates: 32.093395°N 83.783521°W
- Built: 1959
- Architect: Stevens and Wilkinson
- NRHP reference No.: 12001056
- Added to NRHP: December 19, 2012

Vienna High and Industrial School was a school for African Americans on the east side of Vienna, Georgia in Dooly County. It also went by the names Georgia SP Vienna High and Industrial School, Vienna High School, and Vienna Elementary School.

It was listed on the National Register of Historic Places in 2012, for its significant contributions in the areas of architecture, education, black ethnic heritage, and social history. A state historical marker commemorates its history.

== History ==
The Vienna High and Industrial School was built in 1959, after the Vienna County Training School became overcrowded. It is among the largest “equalization” schools in the state of Georgia. It was the only school available to African-American students in Dooly County from 1959 until 1970.

The school campus consisted of three buildings and was designed in the International style by Stevens and Wilkinson, an Atlanta architecture firm. The firm designed various schools, in addition to other projects. At the time of its build the school building had a flat roof, and banks of metal-framed windows; and was constructed with steel framing, concrete-block walls, and brick veneer.

Napoleon Williams was its principal. After desegregation the building was home to the integrated Vienna High School.

== See also ==
- National Register of Historic Places listings in Dooly County, Georgia
