= National Register of Historic Places listings in Dooly County, Georgia =

Map of Georgia with Dooly County highlighted

This is a list of properties and districts in Dooly County, Georgia that are listed on the National Register of Historic Places (NRHP).

This National Park Service list is complete through NPS recent listings posted April 25, 2025.

== Current listings ==
	Name on the Register	Image	Date listed	Location	City or town	Description
1	William H. Byrom House	William H. Byrom House	February 14, 1997 (#97000053)	Main St., near the jct. of GA 90 and the Seaboard Coast RR; 32°12′05″N 83°54′24″W	Dooly	
2	County Training School	County Training School	April 7, 2010 (#10000158)	190 Ninth St. 32°05′30″N 83°47′03″W	Vienna	Not demolished. See Georgia MPS County Training School National Archives photos and Google Street as of 2022.
3	Dooly County Campground		March 1, 2024 (#100009997)	21 Parsonage Road; 32°06′51″N 83°50′09″W	Vienna vicinity	
4	Dooly County Courthouse	Dooly County Courthouse	September 18, 1980 (#80001013)	GA 27; 32°05′28″N 83°47′51″W	Vienna	
5	Leonard-Akin House	Leonard-Akin House	February 14, 1997 (#97000054)	309 E. Union St. 32°05′28″N 83°47′28″W	Vienna	
6	Lilly Historic District	Lilly Historic District	January 5, 1998 (#97001558)	Roughly bounded by CSX RR tracks, and Church, Montezuma, Third, and School Sts. 32°08′54″N 83°52′41″W	Lilly	
7	Stovall-George-Woodward House	Stovall-George-Woodward House	April 27, 1979 (#79000716)	305 Union St. 32°05′28″N 83°47′30″W	Vienna	
8	Vienna High and Industrial School	Vienna High and Industrial School	December 19, 2012 (#12001056)	216 9th St. 32°05′36″N 83°47′00″W	Vienna	
9	Vienna Historic District	Vienna Historic District	January 28, 2005 (#04001557)	Roughly centered on the downtown commercial district and includes residential areas and the rail line 32°05′34″N 83°47′33″W	Vienna	
