= Montravius Adams =

American football player (born 1995)

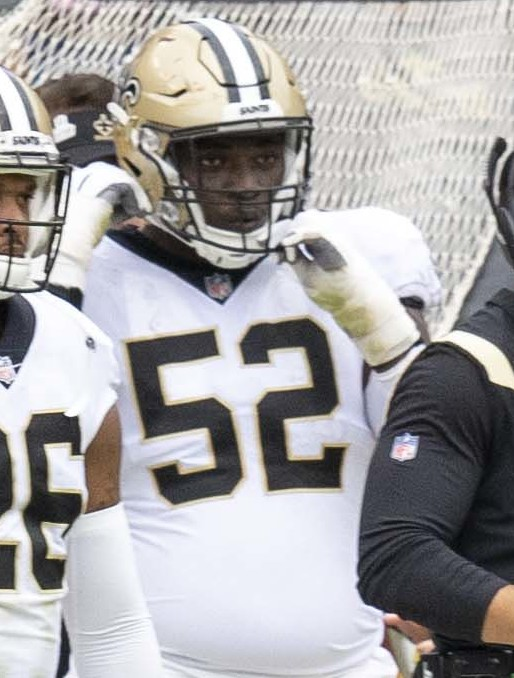
- Adams with the New Orleans Saints in 2021

Profile
- Position: Defensive tackle

Personal information
- Born: July 24, 1995 (age 31); Americus, Georgia, U.S.
- Listed height: 6 ft 4 in (1.93 m)
- Listed weight: 304 lb (138 kg)

Career information
- High school: Dooly County (Vienna, Georgia)
- College: Auburn (2013–2016)
- NFL draft: 2017: 3rd round, 93rd overall pick

Career history
- Green Bay Packers (2017–2020); New England Patriots (2021)*; New Orleans Saints (2021); Pittsburgh Steelers (2021–2024)
- * Offseason or practice squad member only

Awards and highlights
- First-team All-SEC (2016)

Career NFL statistics
- Total tackles: 123
- Sacks: 2.5
- Forced fumbles: 2
- Fumble recoveries: 1
- Pass deflections: 7
- Stats at Pro Football Reference

Montravius Adams (born July 24, 1995) is an American professional football defensive tackle. He played college football for the Auburn Tigers.

== Early life ==
Adams attended Dooly County High School in Vienna, Georgia. As a senior, he recorded 127 tackles, 34 tackles for loss and 7.5 sacks, leading the Bobcats to an 11–3 record and an appearance in the Class A state title game. In addition to being named All-State for the second straight year, he was selected as a participant in the 2013 Under Armour All-America Game.

Adams was rated by Rivals.com as a five-star recruit and the 3rd best defensive lineman in his class. Early on, he leaned towards signing with Clemson (the first school to make an offer), but on National Signing Day in February 2013, Adams committed to play college football for Auburn University.

== College career ==
Adams played in 13 games as a true freshman at Auburn in 2013 and had 20 tackles. In his first career snap, in the season opener against Washington State on August 31, he sacked Cougars quarterback Connor Halliday. At the conclusion of the season, he was named a Freshman All-American by 247 Sports. As a sophomore in 2014, he played in 13 games and made 10 starts, recording 43 tackles, 8 tackles for loss, 3 sacks and an interception. As a junior in 2015, Adams became a permanent starter at nose tackle, and had 44 tackles, 3 tackles for loss, 2.5 sacks and 2 forced fumbles. As a senior, he recorded 44 tackles, 8.5 tackles for loss, 4.5 sacks, 1 forced fumble, 1 interception, 2 blocked kicks, and a touchdown as team captain. SECCounty.com called him "the most consistent force for [an] Auburn defense that went from punchline to power in 2016." He was subsequently named first-team All-SEC, and a second-team All-American (by AP, CBS Sports and AFCA) at the conclusion of the season.

Adams participated in the 2016 Senior Bowl, recording six tackles, one tackle for loss and a fumble recovery.

== Professional career ==
Pre-draft measurables
Height	Weight	Arm length	Hand span	40-yard dash	10-yard split	20-yard split	20-yard shuttle	Three-cone drill	Vertical jump	Broad jump	Bench press
6 ft 3 5/8 in (1.92 m)	304 lb (138 kg)	32 3/4 in (0.83 m)	9 1/4 in (0.23 m)	4.87 s	1.71 s	2.82 s	4.89 s	7.62 s	29 in (0.74 m)	9 ft 0 in (2.74 m)	22 reps
All values are from NFL Combine

=== Green Bay Packers ===
Adams was selected by the Green Bay Packers in the third round, 93rd overall, in the 2017 NFL draft. He signed his rookie contract on July 5, 2017. He underwent foot surgery in August after suffering a stress fracture on the second day of training camp and missed the entire preseason as a result. On November 11, 2018, Adams recorded his first career sack on Miami Dolphins quarterback Brock Osweiler in a 31–12 victory. He was placed on injured reserve on November 25, 2020.

=== New England Patriots ===
On March 19, 2021, Adams signed with the New England Patriots. On August 31, the Patriots released Adams.

=== New Orleans Saints ===
On September 6, 2021, Adams signed with the New Orleans Saints. He was released on November 16 and re-signed to the practice squad.

=== Pittsburgh Steelers ===
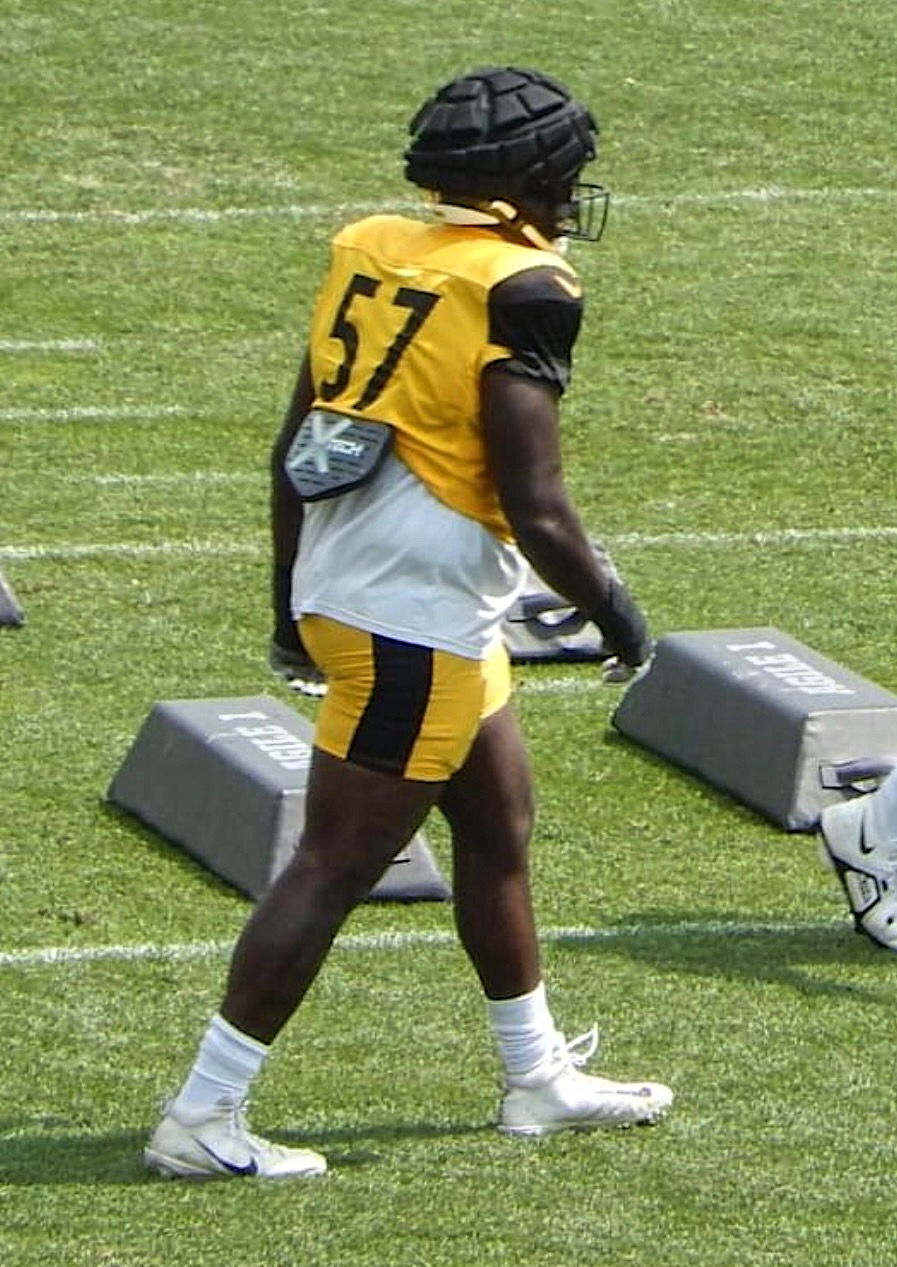
Adams in 2023 with the Steelers

On November 30, 2021 Adams was signed by the Pittsburgh Steelers off the Saints practice squad. He appeared in five regular season games with the Steelers and made his first Steelers post-season appearance in their 41-24 playoffs loss to the Kansas City Chiefs.

On March 22, 2022, Adams signed a two-year contract extension with the Steelers. He went on to play in all 17 regular season games making 12 tackles with one being for a loss as he started in a career high nine games. In 2023, Adams made 11 solo tackles and 13 assisted tackles in 13 games played. He also recorded a forced fumble against the Cleveland Browns. He made his third career post-season appearance on January 15, 2024. He recorded one assisted tackle as the Steelers lost 17-31 to the Buffalo Bills.

On March 19, 2024, Adams re-signed with the Steelers on a two-year contract. He made his first sack as a member of the Steelers on September 8, 2024 against Kirk Cousins as the Steelers defeated the Atlanta Falcons 18-10. In Week 7's victory over the New York Jets, Adams suffered a knee injury that led to him being placed on the team's injured reserve list. He was activated from injured reserve on December 14, 2024.

On April 28, 2025, it was announced that the Steelers were releasing Adams.

== NFL career statistics ==
Year	Team	Games		Tackles				Interceptions				Fumbles			
Year	Team	GP	GS	Comb	Solo	Ast	Sck	PD	Int	Yds	TD	FF	FR	Yds	TD
2017	GB	7	0	2	1	1	0.0	0	0	0	0	0	0	0	0
2018	GB	16	1	20	11	9	1.5	0	0	0	0	1	0	0	0
2019	GB	14	2	11	4	7	0.0	3	0	0	0	0	1	0	0
2020	GB	8	0	11	6	5	0.0	0	0	0	0	0	0	0	0
2021	NO	5	1	7	1	6	0.0	1	0	0	0	0	0	0	0
2021	PIT	5	4	8	6	2	0.0	1	0	0	0	0	0	0	0
2022	PIT	17	9	26	12	14	0.0	1	0	0	0	0	0	0	0
2023	PIT	13	8	24	11	13	0.0	1	0	0	0	1	0	0	0
2024	PIT	11	0	14	9	5	1.0	0	0	0	0	0	0	0	0
Total		96	25	123	61	62	2.5	7	0	0	0	2	1	0	0
Source: pro-football-reference.com

== Personal life ==
Adams has two sons. On April 28, 2017, Adams and his high school sweetheart, Lateisha Gray, had their first child, Montravius Adams, Jr.

Adams is the son of Debbie Young and Bruce Granville.
