= Dooling, Georgia =

- Town
- Location in Dooly County and the state of Georgia
- Coordinates: 32°13′48″N 83°55′44″W
- Country: United States
- State: Georgia
- County: Dooly

Government
  - Type: Mayor-council government
  - Mayor: Joseph Pavlo
  - Councilmember: Amanda Cromer
  - Councilmember: Judith Ross-Volner
  - Councilmember: Nancy Allen

Area
  - Total: 0.46 sq mi (1.20 km^{2})
  - Land: 0.46 sq mi (1.20 km^{2})
  - Water: 0 sq mi (0.00 km^{2})
- Elevation: 371 ft (113 m)

Population (2020)
  - Total: 68
  - Density: 147.0/sq mi (56.74/km^{2})
- Time zone: UTC-5 (Eastern (EST))
  - Summer (DST): UTC-4 (EDT)
- FIPS code: 13-23480
- GNIS feature ID: 2406387

Dooling is a town in Dooly County, Georgia, United States. The population was 68 at the 2020 census.

== History ==
The Georgia General Assembly incorporated the place in 1907 as the "Town of Dooling". The community was named after the maiden name of Ellen Dooling, the wife of a first settler. A post office called Dooling was established in 1890, and remained in operation until 1960.

== Geography ==
Dooling is located in northwestern Dooly County at 32°13′48″N 83°55′42″W (32.229962, -83.928311). It is 9 miles (14 km) southeast of Montezuma, the nearest city, 12 miles (19 km) west of Unadilla, and 14 miles (23 km) northwest of Vienna, the Dooly County seat.

According to the United States Census Bureau, the town of Dooling has a total area of 0.46 square miles (1.2 km^{2}), all land.

== Demographics ==
Historical population
Census	Pop.	Note	%±
1990	28		—
2000	163		482.1%
2010	154		−5.5%
2020	68		−55.8%
U.S. Decennial Census; 1850-1870 1870-1880; 1890-1910 1920-1930; 1940 1950 1960; 1970 1980 1990; 2000 2010 2020

=== Racial and ethnic composition ===
Dooling town, Georgia – Racial and ethnic composition Note: the US Census treats Hispanic/Latino as an ethnic category. This table excludes Latinos from the racial categories and assigns them to a separate category. Hispanics/Latinos may be of any race.
Race / Ethnicity (NH = Non-Hispanic)	Pop 2000	Pop 2010	Pop 2020	% 2000	% 2010	% 2020
White alone (NH)	47	36	20	28.83%	23.38%	29.41%
Black or African American alone (NH)	108	101	46	66.26%	65.58%	67.65%
Native American or Alaska Native alone (NH)	0	0	0	0.00%	0.00%	0.00%
Asian alone (NH)	0	0	1	0.00%	0.00%	1.47%
Native Hawaiian or Pacific Islander alone (NH)	0	0	0	0.00%	0.00%	0.00%
Other race alone (NH)	0	0	0	0.00%	0.00%	0.00%
Mixed race or Multiracial (NH)	1	2	0	0.61%	1.30%	0.00%
Hispanic or Latino (any race)	7	15	1	4.29%	9.74%	1.47%
Total	163	154	68	100.00%	100.00%	100.00%
