= Travis Glover =

American football player (born 2000)

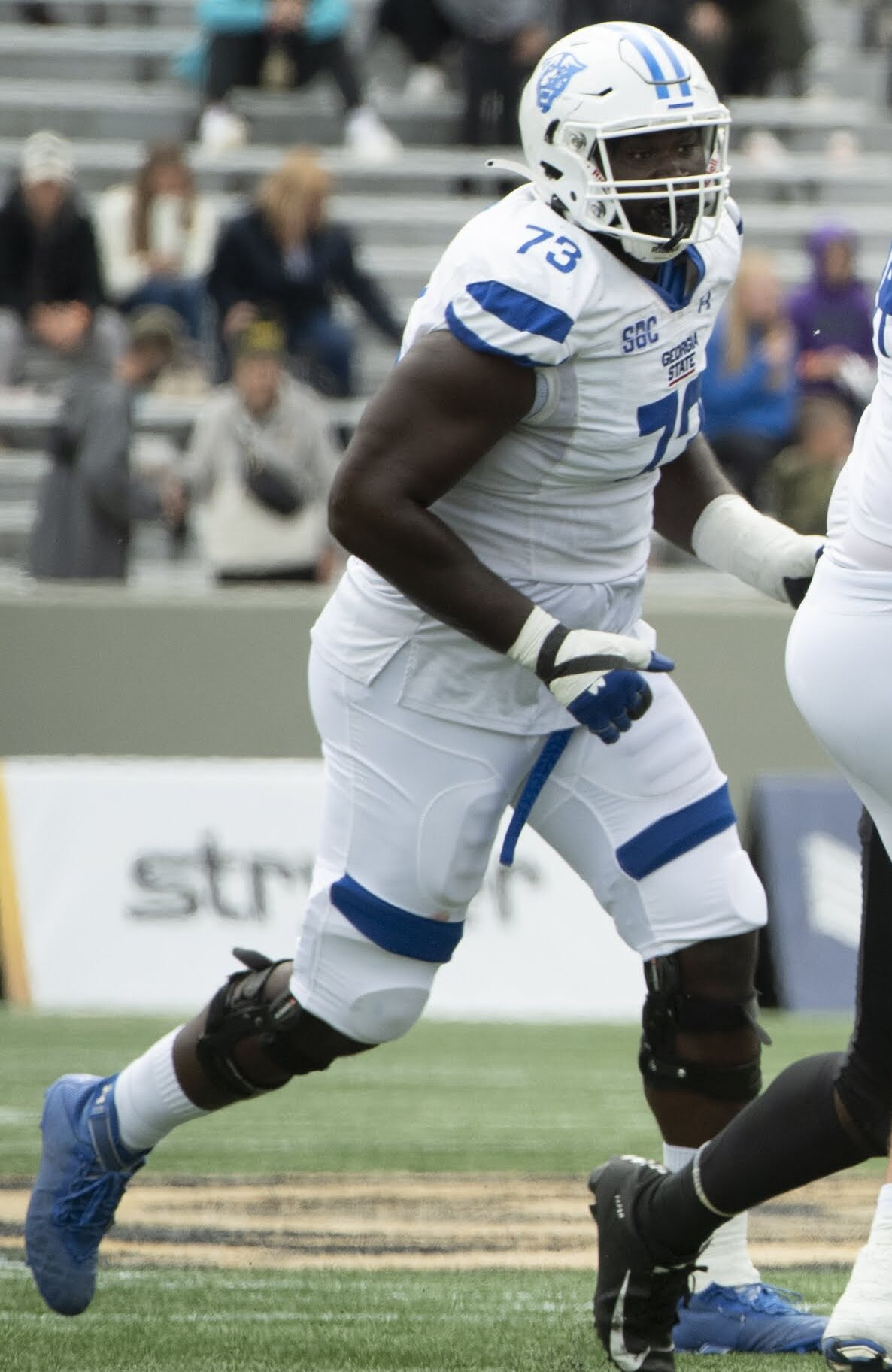
- Glover with Georgia State in 2022

No. 79 – Green Bay Packers
- Position: Guard
- Roster status: Active

Personal information
- Born: August 17, 2000 (age 26); Vienna, Georgia, U.S.
- Listed height: 6 ft 6 in (1.98 m)
- Listed weight: 317 lb (144 kg)

Career information
- High school: Dooly County (GA)
- College: Georgia State (2018–2023)
- NFL draft: 2024: 6th round, 202nd overall pick

Career history
- Green Bay Packers (2024–present)

Awards and highlights
- First team All-Sun Belt (2023)

Career NFL statistics as of Week 10, 2026
- Games played: 12
- Games started: 5
- Stats at Pro Football Reference

Travis Centel Glover Jr. (born August 17, 2000) is an American professional football guard for the Green Bay Packers of the National Football League (NFL). He played college football for the Georgia State Panthers and was selected by the Packers in the sixth round of the 2024 NFL draft.

== Early life ==
Glover was born on August 17, 2000, and grew up in the small town of Vienna, Georgia. He attended Dooly County High School where he became a starting lineman as a junior, playing both ways. He was chosen to the Georgia Elite Classic all-star game that year and later was named first-team all-state and all-region as a senior, when he assisted in getting Dooly County to the second round of the state playoffs. Glover additionally played basketball and was a member of the track and field squad. He was ranked a three-star recruit and committed to play college football for the Georgia State Panthers.

== College career ==
Glover redshirted as a true freshman at Georgia State in 2018. The following year, he won the starting job and started all 13 games while being the second-ever Georgia State player chosen to the Football Writers Association of America (FWAA) Shaun Alexander Freshman All-America team. After having been a right tackle during 2019, he moved to left tackle in 2020 and started all 10 games, then remained in that position and started all 13 games in 2021. He played at both right tackle and left guard during the 2022 season, starting nine of the 11 games he played in while missing another due to injury. He returned for a final season in 2023, having been granted an extra year of eligibility due to the COVID-19 pandemic. He started all 12 games in 2023 and was chosen first-team All-Sun Belt Conference. He ended his collegiate career having totaled 57 starts, second in team history. He was invited to both the Hula Bowl and the 2024 Senior Bowl.

== Professional career ==
Pre-draft measurables
Height	Weight	Arm length	Hand span	Wingspan	40-yard dash	10-yard split	20-yard split	20-yard shuttle	Three-cone drill	Vertical jump	Broad jump	Bench press
6 ft 6 in (1.98 m)	317 lb (144 kg)	34 3/4 in (0.88 m)	9 3/4 in (0.25 m)	7 ft 0 3/8 in (2.14 m)	5.31 s	1.81 s	3.06 s	4.84 s	8.09 s	27.5 in (0.70 m)	8 ft 4 in (2.54 m)	20 reps
All values from Pro Day

Glover was selected in the sixth round (202nd overall) of the 2024 NFL draft by the Green Bay Packers. On May 14, he signed his contract with the Packers. He played in seven games as a rookie as a backup and on special teams.

On August 6, 2025, Glover was placed on injured reserve.
