= Findlay, Georgia =

Unincorporated community in Georgia, U.S.

Coordinates: 32°09′15″N 83°46′18″W

Findlay is an unincorporated community in Dooly County, in the U.S. state of Georgia.

== History ==
A post office called Findlay was established in 1889, and remained in operation until 1905. The community was named after one Mr. Findlay, the proprietor of a local sawmill.
