= Perry Earl Murray =

American politician

Perry Earl Murray (December 16, 1899 – 1955) was a state legislator in Florida. He served in the Florida House of Representatives and Florida Senate, including as President of the Florida Senate. Murray lived in Frostproof, Florida. Florida legislators paid tribute to him on the occasion of his untimely death. He was a Democrat.

He was born in Vienna, Georgia. He studied at Georgia Normal College and Business Institute and received an LLB from Mercer University. He moved to Frostproof in 1926 after working for a few years as a lawyer in Macon.
