= Dooly State Prison =

Medium security facility in Georgia, US

Coordinates: 32°16′51″N 83°43′01″W

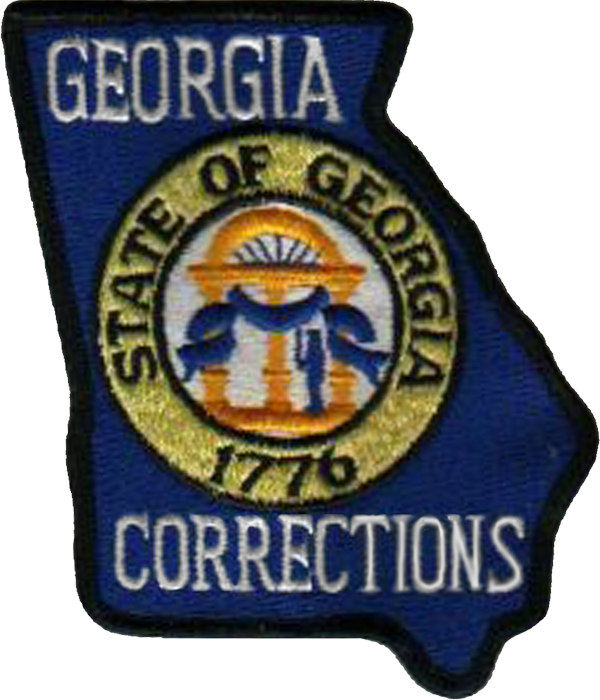
- Interactive map of Dooly State Prison
- Location: 1412 Plunket Road Unadilla, Georgia
- Status: open
- Security class: medium
- Capacity: 1702
- Opened: 1994
- Managed by: Georgia Department of Corrections

Dooly State Prison (DSP) is a medium security facility located in Unadilla, Georgia, United States. The complex began its construction in 1993 and opened in 1994. It houses male inmates who are not suitable for a county prison due to their offense or physical limitations, primarily sex offenders. It can house up to 1702 prisoners in dorms that are triple bunks, double bunks, with some single beds. There is a separate unit for incorrigible inmates.

Dooly has many different types of programs to help inmates and certain inmates are given the opportunity to participate in various activities. It also provides educational services and medical, recreation, library, chapel, and general work programs for all inmates assigned.

== Habitation ==
The maximum housing capacity is 1702. It consists of nine living units of which the bottom range are 24 triple cells (72 beds), and the top range are doubled-bunked cells 120 beds per cell (240 beds), and one open living unit with four separate living areas, which contain 368 beds. There is one block that contains 71 beds, the isolation/segregation Unit. The Fast Track Unit is double bunked and houses 256 beds.

== Programs ==
All Dooly's prisoners have the right to participate in different kinds of recreational programs offered by the prison, such as bee keeping. Some of these programs help improve the inmate's life and their chances after prison. Education is an option and inmates can learn to read and write, as well as earn their GED.

Other individual and group activities are offered, such as counseling for sex offenders, family violence, or substance abuse. Dooly also offers re-entry skills and allows their inmates to practice different religion practices. Vocational activities such as food service, plumber, and electrical helper are also offered.

== Visitation ==
Dooly State Prison allows inmates visitation days on Saturdays, Sundays, and state holidays. Visitors must be an immediate family member or another person that the inmate has placed on a visitors list. Special visits are allowed if there are special circumstances but must be approved by the warden at least 48 hours in advance. Visitors should schedule and confirm an appointment prior to their visit. The only personal items permitted during visitation is one car key and an identity document. Dress code for all visitors are long sleeve shirts with no writings or drawings, no gym wear, if sandals are worn there must be straps on the back; basic colors such as white or gray are best.

== Controversies ==
In 1996 eleven prisoners filed a lawsuit against the Dooly State Prison guards. They alleged that the guards “engaged in sadistic and degrading abuse”. However, due to the passage of the Prison Litigation Reform Act which states that “no federal action may be brought by a prisoner for mental or emotional injury suffered while in custody, without a prior showing of physical injury” the lawsuit was rejected in an “8-4 ruling” by the federal appeals court in Atlanta.

In February 2014, inmate Mitchell Lavern Ludy, serving a life sentence for murder, placed a lawsuit against the institution stating that he was denied kosher food during Passover. Ludy asserted he was raised a Jew and claimed he was “a victim of religious persecution and mental and emotional distress” as a consequence of being denied the ability to celebrate the holiday. Officers argued that he was not allowed kosher food due to the section of the prison in which he was housed. Ludy, however, declared that “a memo was distributed saying Muslims housed in the same area could observe their holy month” He also declared in his statement that he previously told officers about replacing his food before the actual holiday date so they could take measures in doing so when the time came. Ludy placed his lawsuit for $16 million but in May 2016, signed an agreement to settle the case for $200.

In February 2016, Dooly was one of nine Georgia state prisons implicated in an FBI sting operation. This operation led to the indictment of 46 correctional officers on federal charges, ten of whom were Dooly State Prison employees. During the raid, FBI officers found contraband inside the prison such as “cellphones, weapons and drugs”, much of which was illegally brought inside the prison by the officers.
