= Pinehurst, Georgia =

- City
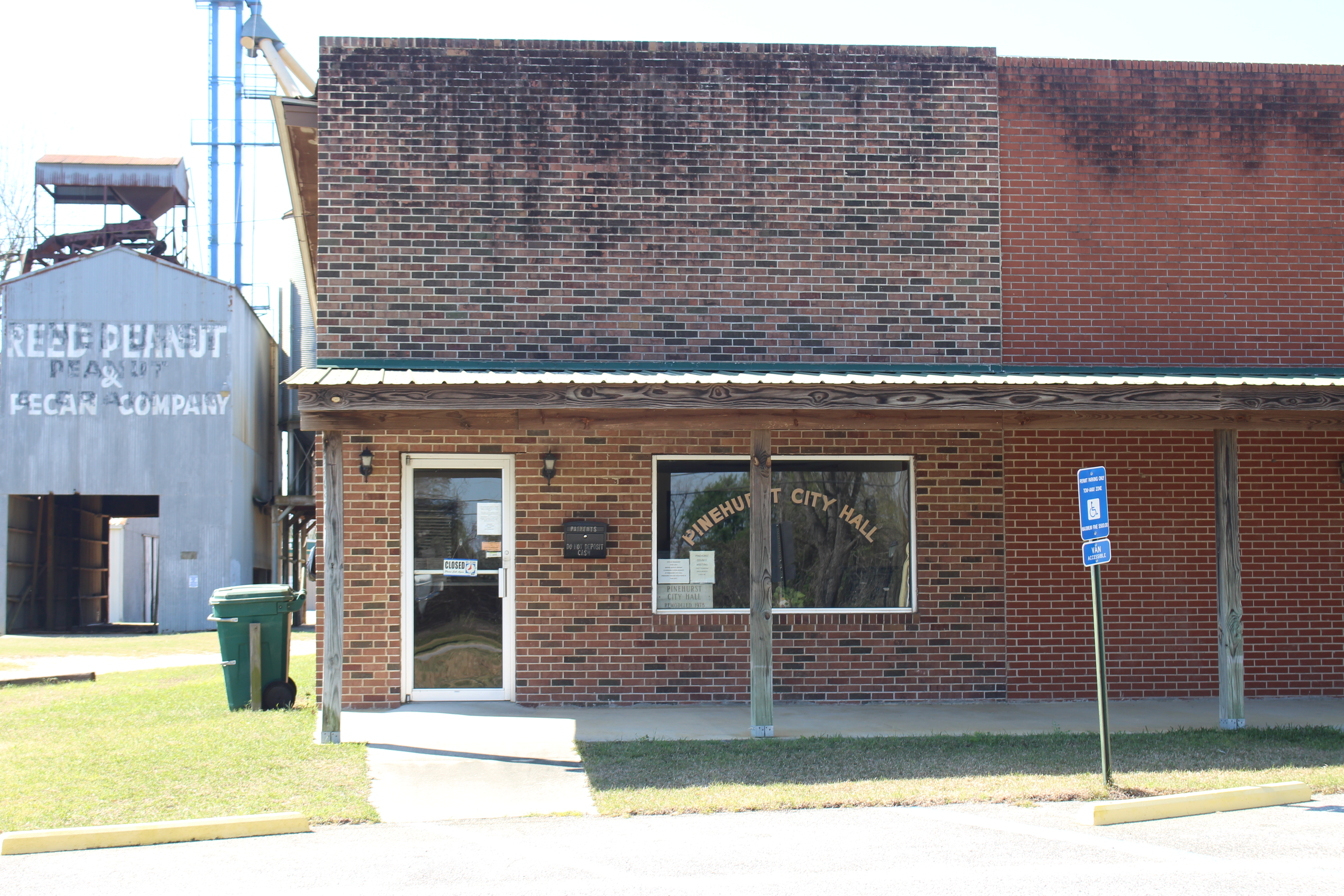
- Pinehurst City Hall

- Location in Dooly County and the state of Georgia
- Coordinates: 32°11′40″N 83°45′40″W
- Country: United States
- State: Georgia
- County: Dooly

Area
  - Total: 1.02 sq mi (2.64 km^{2})
  - Land: 1.02 sq mi (2.63 km^{2})
  - Water: 0.0039 sq mi (0.01 km^{2})
- Elevation: 413 ft (126 m)

Population (2020)
  - Total: 309
  - Density: 303.8/sq mi (117.29/km^{2})
- Time zone: UTC-5 (Eastern (EST))
  - Summer (DST): UTC-4 (EDT)
- ZIP code: 31070
- Area code: 229
- FIPS code: 13-60984
- GNIS feature ID: 0320662
- Website: cityofpinehurstga.com

Pinehurst is a city in Dooly County, Georgia, United States. The population was 305 in 2024.

== History ==
The Georgia General Assembly incorporated Pinehurst in 1895. The community was named for the pine trees abundant in Georgia.

== Geography ==
Pinehurst is located northeast of the center of Dooly County at 32°11′40″N 83°45′40″W (32.194472, -83.761112). U.S. Route 41 passes through the center of town as Pine Avenue, leading north 5 miles (8 km) to Unadilla and south 8 miles (13 km) to Vienna, the county seat. Interstate 75 passes just east of the town limits, with access from Exit 117; I-75 leads north 48 miles (77 km) to Macon and south 56 miles (90 km) to Tifton.

According to the United States Census Bureau, the city has a total area of 1.0 square mile (2.6 km^{2}), all land.

== Demographics ==
Historical population
Census	Pop.	Note	%±
1900	330		—
1910	451		36.7%
1920	596		32.2%
1930	519		−12.9%
1940	474		−8.7%
1950	430		−9.3%
1960	457		6.3%
1970	405		−11.4%
1980	431		6.4%
1990	388		−10.0%
2000	307		−20.9%
2010	455		48.2%
2020	309		−32.1%
U.S. Decennial Census

As of the census of 2000, there were 307 people, 145 households, and 87 families residing in the city. By 2020, its population was 309.
