= Mrs. Henry F. Akin House =

Historic house in Illinois, United States

- U.S. National Register of Historic Places
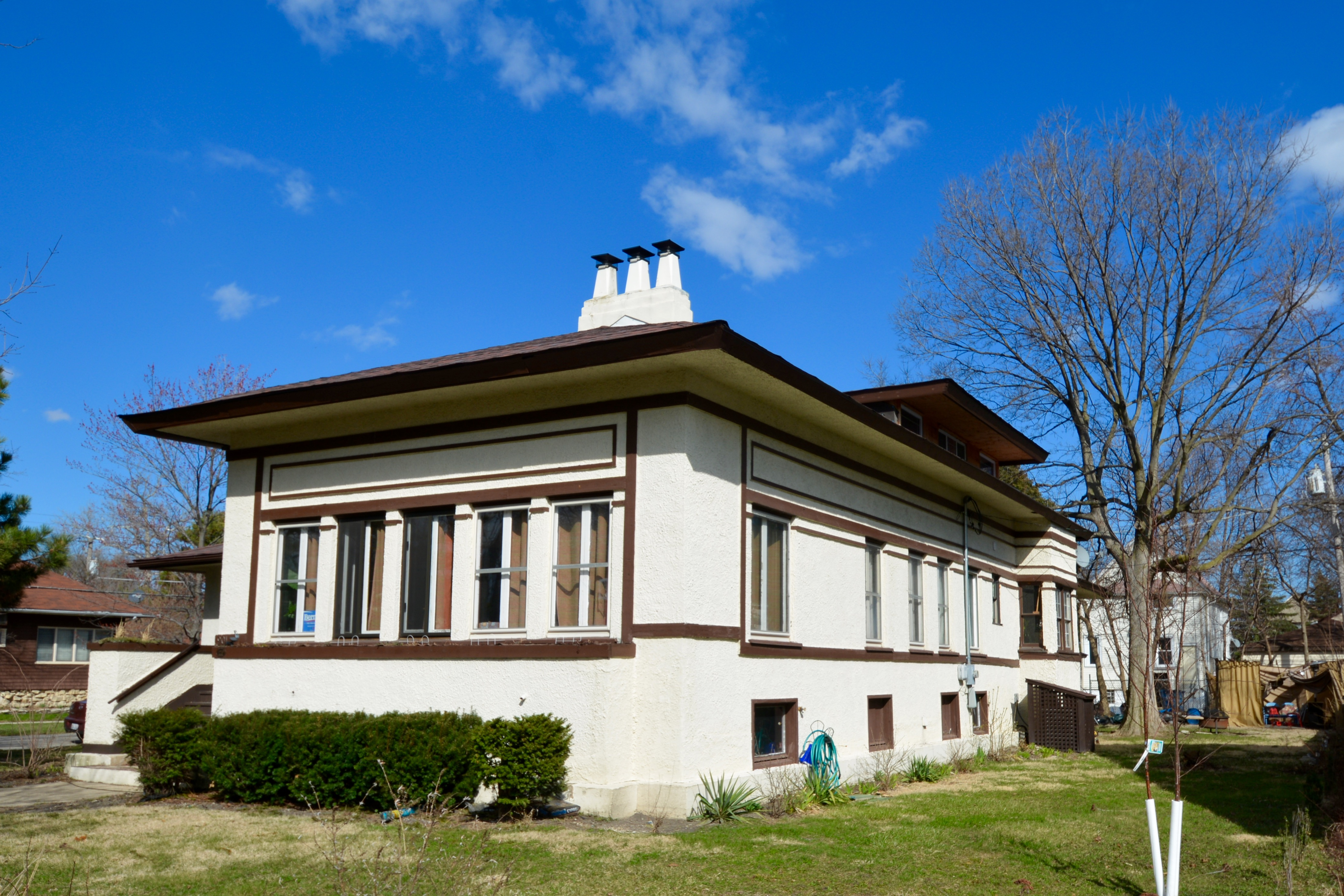

- Location within Chicago metropolitan area Location within Illinois Location within the United States
- Location: 901 South 8th Avenue, Maywood, Illinois
- Coordinates: 41°52′46″N 87°50′31″W
- Area: less than one acre
- Built: c. 1910
- Architect: Tallmadge & Watson
- Architectural style: Prairie School
- MPS: Maywood MPS
- NRHP reference No.: 92000487
- Added to NRHP: May 22, 1992

The Mrs. Henry F. Akin House is a historic house at 901 South 8th Avenue in Maywood, Illinois. The house was built circa 1910 for Elizabeth R. Akin, the wife of former Maywood mayor Henry F. Akin. Tallmadge and Watson, Chicago-area architects who were pioneers of the Prairie School style, designed the home. The one-story bungalow features a stucco exterior, wood banding which forms geometric shapes, casement windows, and overhanging eaves, all typical elements of early Prairie works. The house is one of three in Maywood designed by prominent Prairie School architects and the only bungalow of the three.

The house was added to the National Register of Historic Places on May 22, 1992.
