= Drayton, Georgia =

Unincorporated community in Georgia, U.S.

Coordinates: 32°04′27″N 83°57′20″W

Drayton is an unincorporated community in Dooly County, in the U.S. state of Georgia.

== History ==
The community was named after William Drayton (1776–1846), an American congressman. A post office called Drayton was established in 1836, and remained in operation until 1901. The Georgia General Assembly incorporated the place in 1869 as the "Town of Drayton". The town's municipal charter was dissolved in 1995.
