= Byromville, Georgia =

- Town
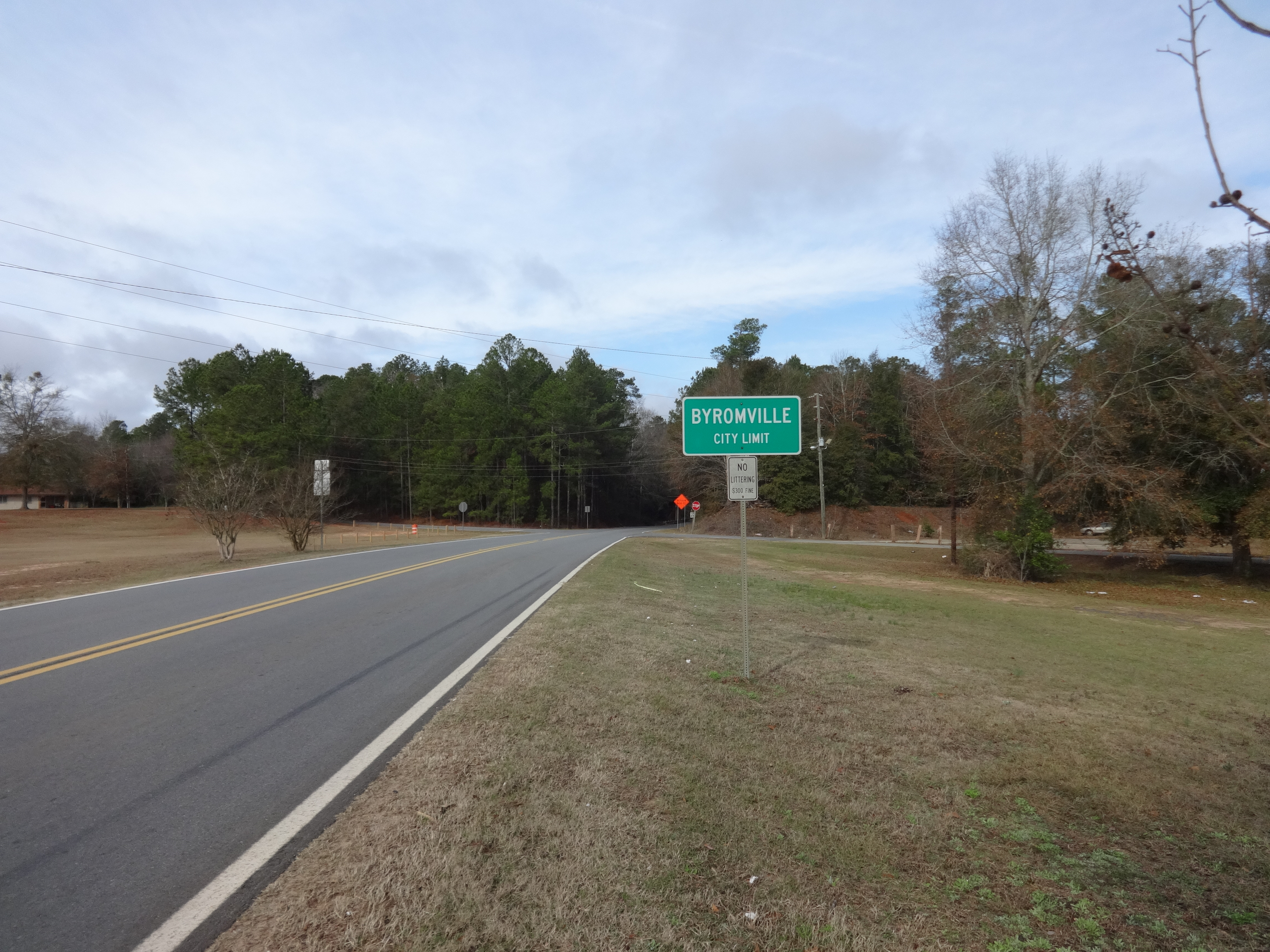
- Byromville city limit on GA90

- Location in Dooly County and the state of Georgia
- Coordinates: 32°12′5″N 83°54′29″W
- Country: United States
- State: Georgia
- County: Dooly

Area
  - Total: 0.36 sq mi (0.94 km^{2})
  - Land: 0.36 sq mi (0.94 km^{2})
  - Water: 0 sq mi (0.00 km^{2})
- Elevation: 381 ft (116 m)

Population (2020)
  - Total: 422
  - Density: 1,165.9/sq mi (450.17/km^{2})
- Time zone: UTC-5 (Eastern (EST))
  - Summer (DST): UTC-4 (EDT)
- ZIP code: 31007
- Area code: 478
- FIPS code: 13-12232
- GNIS feature ID: 0354929

Byromville is a town in Dooly County, Georgia, United States. The population was 546 at the 2010 census, up from 415 in 2000. In 2020, its population was 422.

== History ==
The Georgia General Assembly incorporated the Town of Byromville in 1905. The town was named in honor of early resident William H. Byrom.

== Geography ==
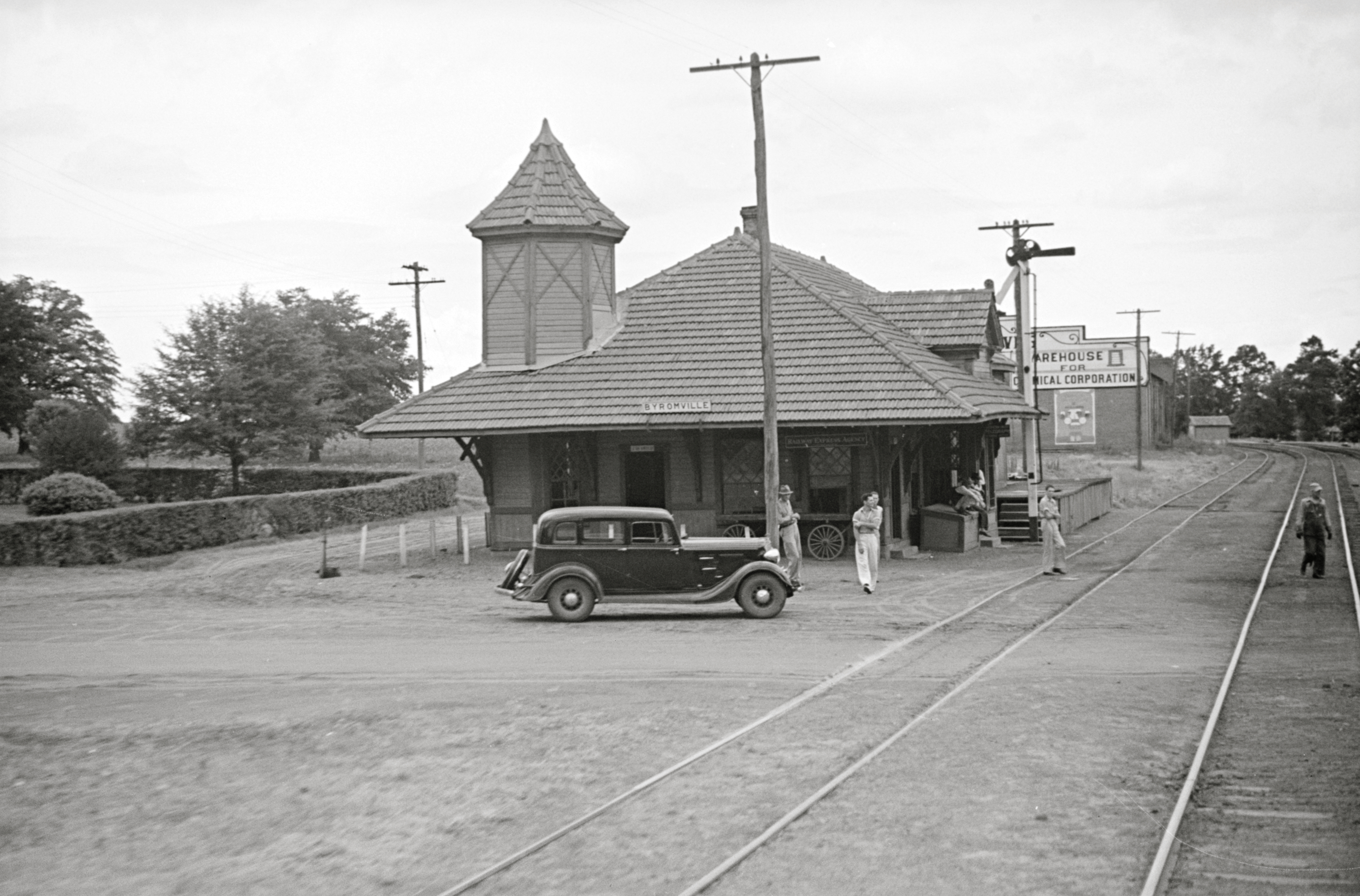
Byromville train station circa 1939

Byromville is located in northwestern Dooly County at 32°12′5″N 83°54′29″W (32.201496, -83.908028). Georgia State Route 90 passes through the center of town, leading southeast 11 miles (18 km) to Vienna, the county seat, and northwest 10 miles (16 km) to Montezuma. SR 230 leads northeast from Byromville 12 miles (19 km) to Unadilla and southwest 10 miles (16 km) to SR 27 at Drayton. Located nearly halfway between the cities of Cordele and Perry Georgia. And about an hour and a half from Alabama, about 3 hours from South Carolina, about an hour and a half from Florida, 4 hours from Tennessee and North Carolina. And 2 hours from Atlanta.

According to the United States Census Bureau, the town has a total area of 0.94 square kilometres (0.36 sq mi), all land.

== Demographics ==
Historical population
Census	Pop.	Note	%±
1910	300		—
1920	414		38.0%
1930	315		−23.9%
1940	275		−12.7%
1950	288		4.7%
1960	349		21.2%
1970	419		20.1%
1980	567		35.3%
1990	452		−20.3%
2000	415		−8.2%
2010	546		31.6%
2020	422		−22.7%
2023 (est.)	335	▼	−20.6%
U.S. Decennial Census

=== Racial and ethnic composition ===
Byromville town, Georgia – Racial and ethnic composition Note: the US Census treats Hispanic/Latino as an ethnic category. This table excludes Latinos from the racial categories and assigns them to a separate category. Hispanics/Latinos may be of any race.
Race / Ethnicity (NH = Non-Hispanic)	Pop 2000	Pop 2010	Pop 2020	% 2000	% 2010	% 2020
White alone (NH)	171	199	170	41.20%	36.45%	40.28%
Black or African American alone (NH)	214	269	202	51.57%	49.27%	47.87%
Native American or Alaska Native alone (NH)	2	0	0	0.48%	0.00%	0.00%
Asian alone (NH)	4	1	2	0.96%	0.18%	0.47%
Native Hawaiian or Pacific Islander alone (NH)	0	0	0	0.00%	0.00%	0.00%
Other race alone (NH)	0	0	0	0.00%	0.00%	0.00%
Mixed race or Multiracial (NH)	2	1	8	0.48%	0.18%	1.90%
Hispanic or Latino (any race)	22	76	40	5.30%	13.92%	9.48%
Total	415	546	422	100.00%	100.00%	100.00%

== Arts and culture ==
Byromville is host to the annual Turkey Creek Festival.
