= Big Pig Jig =

Barbecue cooking competition in Georgia U.S.

Coordinates: 32°5′22.98″N 83°46′10.41″W

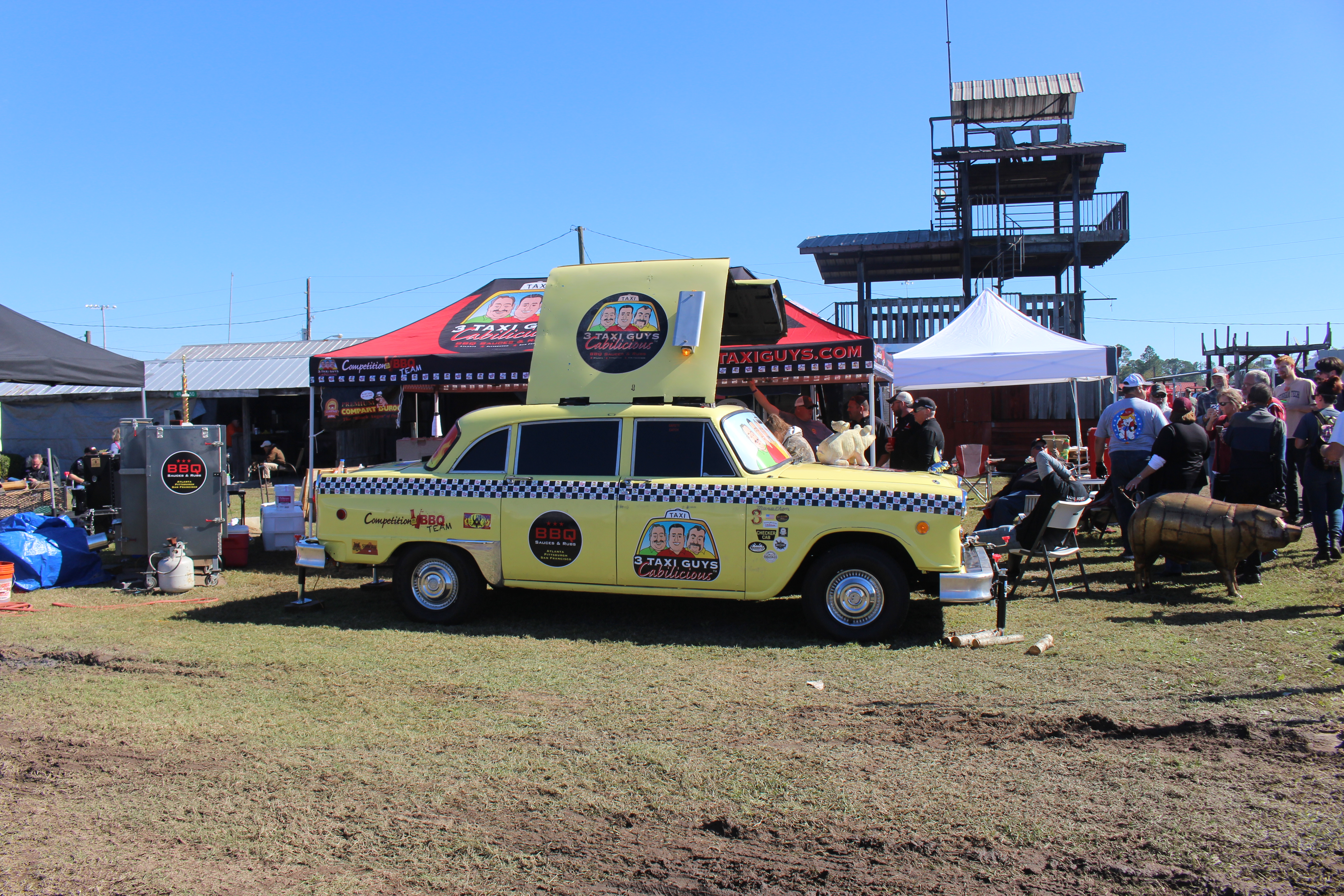
Big Pig Jig, 2018

The Big Pig Jig (official name Slosheye Trail Big Pig Jig) is a barbecue cooking competition held annually in Vienna, Georgia. It is the state pork cook-off of Georgia.

== History ==
In 1982, a group of "pig cookers" in Vienna, Georgia, created the Big Pig Jig by combining a barbecue competition with an arts and crafts fair. From 20 teams in 1982, the event now has about 100 teams competing. Currently, the winner of the competition receives $2,500 and is invited to compete in the Memphis In May barbecue cook-off in Memphis, Tennessee, as well as the Memphis Barbecue Network Championship, which is held in different cities each year.

At the first Big Pig Jig, the teams competed in the "Whole Hog" category only, and the winner was awarded $1,000. The competition currently includes an academic quiz bowl, a 5K "Hog Jog", and a golf scholarship tournament. Since its inception the competition has had about 25,000 spectators, and now requires about 350 judges.

The Big Pig Jig went on hiatus in 2020, it returned in 2021.

== Rules ==
Primary categories for the event are Whole Hog, Shoulder and Rib. There are also ancillary categories such as Sauce, Stew and Chicken. Ancillary categories are not considered when determining the Grand Champion.

Teams may cook one, two or all three primary categories.

Entries are judged by seven judges: three in the onsite portion and four in the blind portion. Onsite judges score each entry based on the following criteria: Area and Personal Appearance, Presentation, Appearance of Entry, Tenderness, Flavor, and Overall Impression. Blind judges score each entry in Appearance of Entry, Tenderness, Flavor, and Overall Impression.

Entries are scored on a 10 point scale, with 10 being the highest. The Overall Impression criteria allows for decimal scoring (i.e. 9.9), while other criteria only allow whole number scoring (i.e. 8, 9, 10).

Onsite judges visit three teams each, and compare the products presented by those teams to determine which is the best product they sampled that day.

Blind judges have four to six entries on their table. The blind judges compare those entries to determine which is the best product they sampled that day. Blind judging uses a double blind system to insure that the judges do not know which teams produced the entries on their tables.

There are two rounds of judging: Preliminary and Finals judging. All entries in a category participate in the preliminary round. The top three entries in each category then move to the finals round. The Finals round begins a new set of judging; however, there is no blind judging in the finals round. There are four judges in the finals round, and those judges will sample each of the nine Finals entries (three Hog, three Shoulder, three Rib). The goal of the finals judges is to rank each entry to determine the best entry of the day, and to rank each entry in the relevant category.

Only those teams who make it to the finals round are considered for the Grand Championship. In the finals round, the judges are searching for the best entry of the day.

Teams may cook with any type of wood or charcoal. Electricity or gas can be used to start the initial fire. All preparation of the meat must be done during the competition.

== Sources ==
- Jimesnes, John (2005-11-15). "Pig Jig Time". Cordele Dispatch.
- Minor, Elliott (2003-09-22). "Barbecue Lovers are in Hog Heaven". The Associated Press.
- The Associated Press (2005-09-18). "Record Turnout Simmering for Big Pig Jig".
