= Leonard–Akin House =

- U.S. National Register of Historic Places
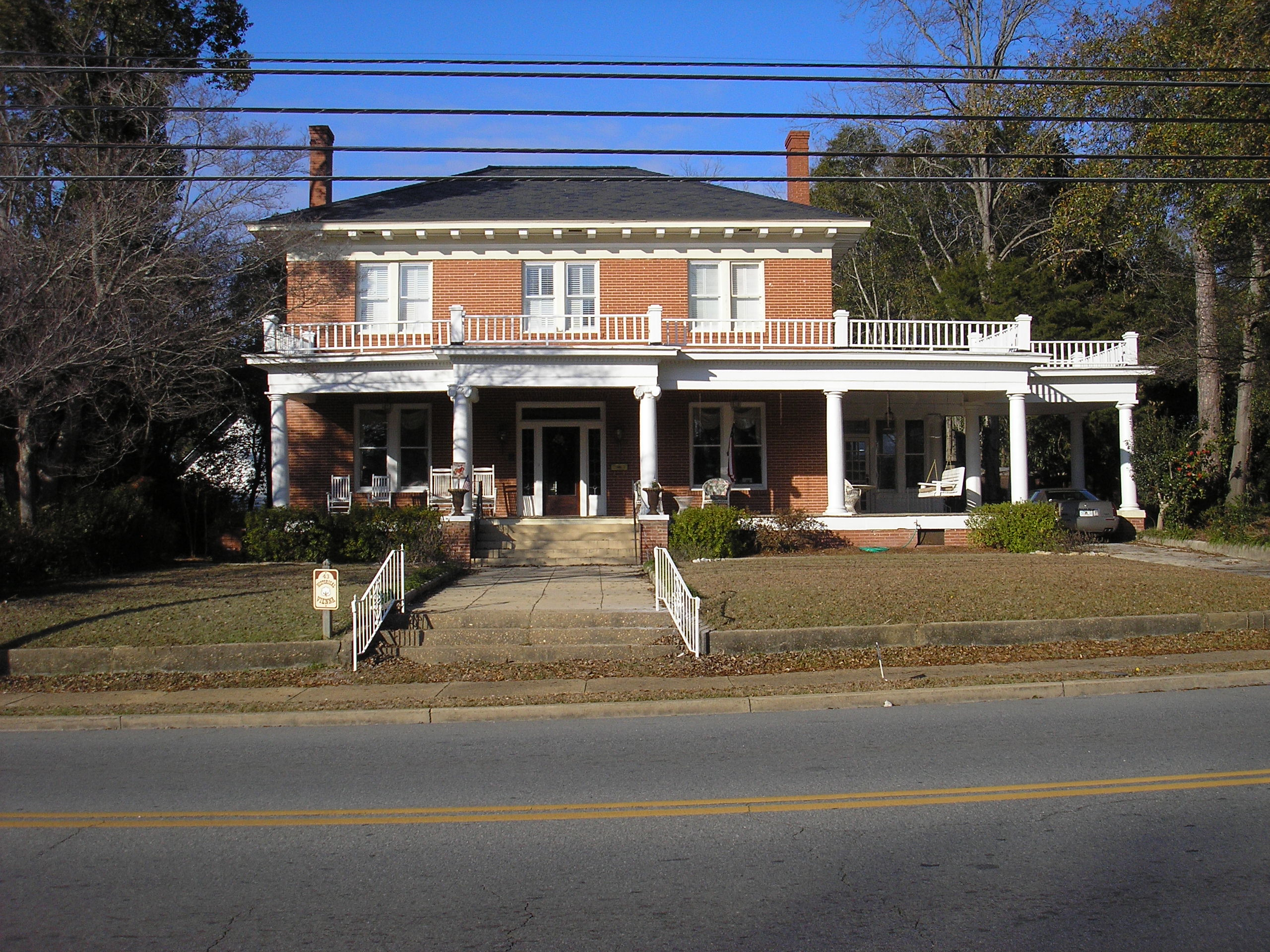

- Location within Georgia
- Location: 309 E. Union St., Vienna, Georgia
- Coordinates: 32°05′28″N 83°47′28″W
- Area: less than one acre
- Built: c.1914
- Built by: Mr. P.G. Pusbee
- Architectural style: Classical Revival
- NRHP reference No.: 97000054
- Added to NRHP: February 14, 1997

The Leonard–Akin House, at 309 E. Union St. (Georgia State Route 90) in Vienna, Georgia, was built around 1914. It was listed on the National Register of Historic Places in 1997.

It is a two-story Classical Revival house. It was built by contractor P.G. Pusbee, who would later father George Busbee (1927–2004), who would become governor of Georgia from 1974 to 1982.

A second contributing building is a one-story brick carriage house, also built around 1914. In 1992, this served as an apartment, and had arched window and door openings, a metal hipped roof, and beaded board ceilings.
