= Snow Spring, Georgia =

Unincorporated community in Georgia, U.S.

Coordinates: 32°15′16″N 83°46′54″W

Snow Spring is an unincorporated community in Dooly County, in the U.S. state of Georgia.

== History ==
Variant names were "Snow" and "Snow Springs". A post office called Snow was established in 1879, and remained in operation until 1905. The community was so named from the white "snowy" sand in a spring near the original town site.
