= Dooly County, Georgia =

County in Georgia, United States

- County
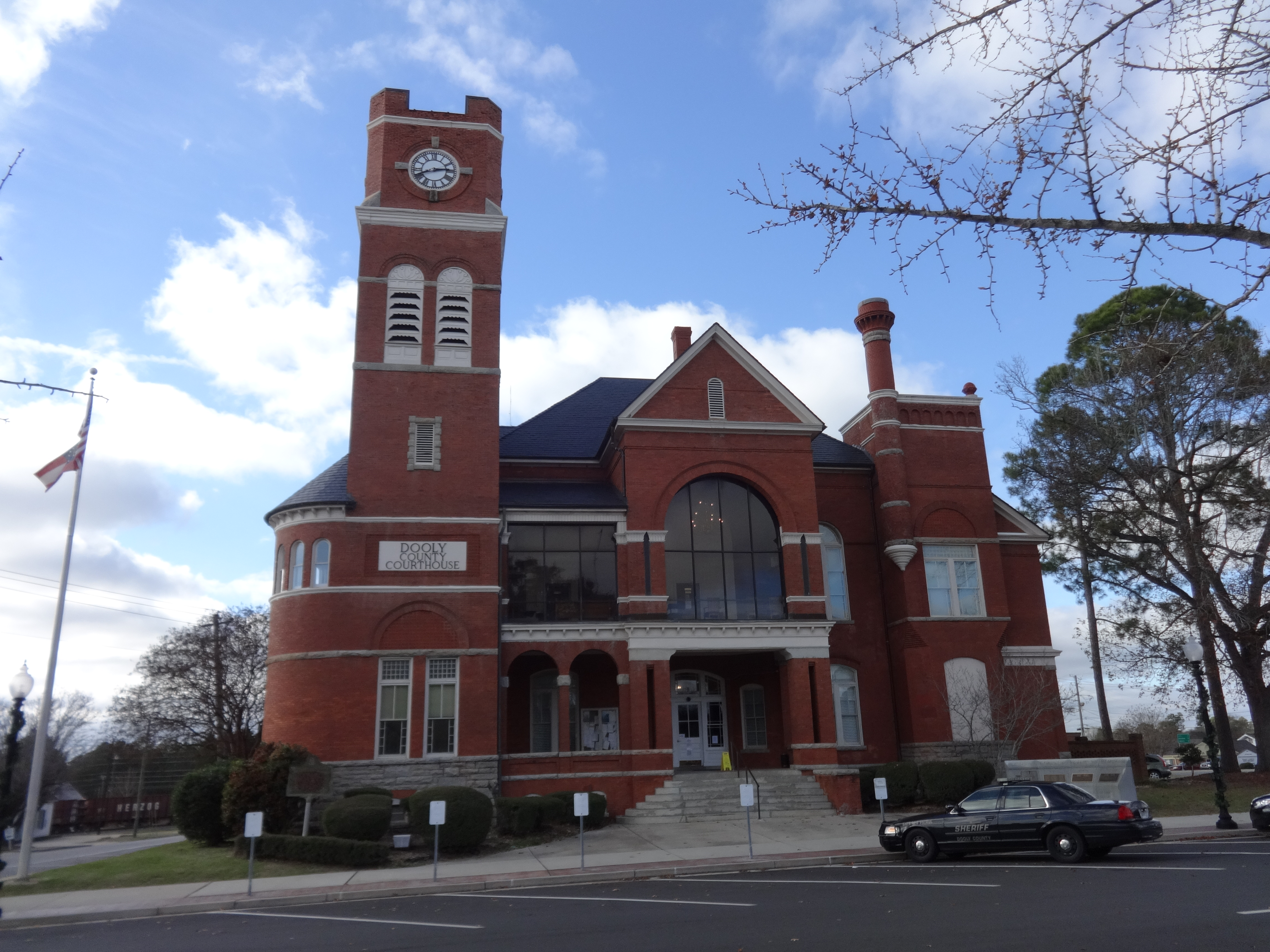
- Dooly County Courthouse in Vienna

- Location within the U.S. state of Georgia
- Coordinates: 32°10′N 83°48′W
- Country: United States
- State: Georgia
- Founded: May 15, 1821; 205 years ago
- Named for: John Dooly
- Seat: Vienna
- Largest city: Unadilla

Area
  - Total: 397 sq mi (1,030 km^{2})
  - Land: 392 sq mi (1,020 km^{2})
  - Water: 5.3 sq mi (14 km^{2}) 1.3%

Population (2020)
  - Total: 11,208
  - Estimate (2025): 11,156 ▼
  - Density: 29/sq mi (11/km^{2})
- Time zone: UTC−5 (Eastern)
  - Summer (DST): UTC−4 (EDT)
- Congressional district: 2nd
- Website: doolycountyga.com

Dooly County is a county located in the central portion of the U.S. state of Georgia. As of the 2020 census, the population was 11,208. The county seat is Vienna. The county was created by an act of the Georgia General Assembly on May 15, 1821, and named for Colonel John Dooly, a Georgia American Revolutionary War fighter. It was one of the original landlot counties created from land ceded from the Creek Nation.

The entire county of Crisp and parts of Macon, Pulaski, Turner, Wilcox and Worth counties were formed from Dooly's original borders.

== Geography ==
According to the U.S. Census Bureau, the county has a total area of 397 square miles (1,030 km^{2}), of which 392 square miles (1,020 km^{2}) is land and 5.3 square miles (14 km^{2}) (1.3%) is water. The county is located in the upper Atlantic coastal plain region of the state.

The western two-thirds of Dooly County, from west of Unadilla south to Pinehurst, then to the southeastern corner of the county, is located in the Middle Flint River sub-basin of the ACF River Basin (Apalachicola-Chattahoochee-Flint River Basin). The northeastern and eastern portion of Dooly County is located in the Lower Ocmulgee River sub-basin of the Altamaha River basin. The very southeastern corner of the county is located in the Alapaha River sub-basin of the Suwannee River basin.

=== Major highways ===
- Interstate 75 / State Route 401 (unsigned)
- U.S. Route 41 / State Route 7
- State Route 27
- State Route 90
- State Route 215
- State Route 230
  - State Route 230 Connector
- State Route 257
- State Route 329

=== Adjacent counties ===
- Houston County – northeast
- Pulaski County – east
- Wilcox County – southeast
- Crisp County – south
- Sumter County – west
- Macon County – northwest

== Communities ==
=== Cities ===
- Lilly
- Byromville
- Pinehurst
- Unadilla
- Vienna (county seat)

=== Towns ===
- Dooling
- Drayton
- Findlay

== Demographics ==
Historical population
Census	Pop.	Note	%±
1830	2,135		—
1840	4,427		107.4%
1850	8,361		88.9%
1860	8,917		6.6%
1870	9,790		9.8%
1880	12,420		26.9%
1890	18,146		46.1%
1900	26,567		46.4%
1910	20,554		−22.6%
1920	20,522		−0.2%
1930	18,025		−12.2%
1940	16,886		−6.3%
1950	14,159		−16.1%
1960	11,474		−19.0%
1970	10,404		−9.3%
1980	10,826		4.1%
1990	9,901		−8.5%
2000	11,525		16.4%
2010	14,918		29.4%
2020	11,208		−24.9%
2026 (est.)	11,156	▼	−0.5%
U.S. Decennial Census; 1790–1880 1890–1910; 1920–1930 1930–1940; 1940–1950 1960–1980; 1980–2000 2010

=== Racial and ethnic composition ===
Dooly County, Georgia – Racial and ethnic composition Note: the US Census treats Hispanic/Latino as an ethnic category. This table excludes Latinos from the racial categories and assigns them to a separate category. Hispanics/Latinos may be of any race.
Race / Ethnicity (NH = Non-Hispanic)	Pop 1980	Pop 1990	Pop 2000	Pop 2010	Pop 2020	% 1980	% 1990	% 2000	% 2010	% 2020
White alone (NH)	5,494	4,959	5,161	6,461	4,611	50.75%	50.09%	44.78%	43.31%	41.14%
Black or African American alone (NH)	5,182	4,832	5,679	7,381	5,540	47.87%	48.80%	49.28%	49.48%	49.43%
Native American or Alaska Native alone (NH)	5	3	17	16	17	0.05%	0.03%	0.15%	0.11%	0.15%
Asian alone (NH)	17	30	49	93	51	0.16%	0.30%	0.43%	0.62%	0.46%
Native Hawaiian or Pacific Islander alone (NH)	x	x	11	3	2	x	x	0.10%	0.02%	0.02%
Other race alone (NH)	5	0	5	6	14	0.05%	0.00%	0.04%	0.04%	0.12%
Mixed race or Multiracial (NH)	x	x	66	96	176	x	x	0.57%	0.64%	1.57%
Hispanic or Latino (any race)	123	77	537	862	797	1.14%	0.78%	4.66%	5.78%	7.11%
Total	10,826	9,901	11,525	14,918	11,208	100.00%	100.00%	100.00%	100.00%	100.00%

=== 2020 census ===
As of the 2020 census, the county had a population of 11,208. The median age was 43.4 years. 18.0% of residents were under the age of 18 and 19.3% of residents were 65 years of age or older. For every 100 females there were 122.4 males, and for every 100 females age 18 and over there were 127.9 males age 18 and over. 0.0% of residents lived in urban areas, while 100.0% lived in rural areas.

The racial makeup of the county was 41.9% White, 49.6% Black or African American, 0.2% American Indian and Alaska Native, 0.5% Asian, 0.0% Native Hawaiian and Pacific Islander, 5.0% from some other race, and 2.8% from two or more races. Hispanic or Latino residents of any race comprised 7.1% of the population.

There were 4,047 households in the county, of which 25.3% had children under the age of 18 living with them and 36.3% had a female householder with no spouse or partner present. About 32.4% of all households were made up of individuals and 14.9% had someone living alone who was 65 years of age or older.

There were 4,762 housing units, of which 15.0% were vacant. Among occupied housing units, 66.9% were owner-occupied and 33.1% were renter-occupied. The homeowner vacancy rate was 1.4% and the rental vacancy rate was 10.1%.

== Economy ==
The Big Pig Jig, Georgia's official State Barbecue Cooking Championship, is held annually in Fall in Dooly County and attracts a national audience. The county is also notable for cotton and peanut production.

== Politics ==
As of the 2020s, Dooly County is a swing county, voting 53.7% for Donald Trump in 2024. The county flipped in 2016 after voting for every Democratic Party presidential candidate since 1976. For elections to the United States House of Representatives, Dooly County is part of Georgia's 2nd congressional district, currently represented by Sanford Bishop. For elections to the Georgia State Senate, Dooly County is part of District 20. For elections to the Georgia House of Representatives, Dooly County is part of District 150.

United States presidential election results for Dooly County, Georgia
Year	Republican		Democratic		Third party(ies)	
Year	No.	%	No.	%	No.	%
1912	33	5.10%	609	94.13%	5	0.77%
1916	31	4.04%	737	95.96%	0	0.00%
1920	39	6.69%	544	93.31%	0	0.00%
1924	45	7.06%	590	92.62%	2	0.31%
1928	156	17.33%	744	82.67%	0	0.00%
1932	8	0.70%	1,139	98.96%	4	0.35%
1936	41	2.97%	1,339	97.03%	0	0.00%
1940	124	9.27%	1,209	90.43%	4	0.30%
1944	87	9.33%	845	90.67%	0	0.00%
1948	22	3.37%	577	88.50%	53	8.13%
1952	197	10.05%	1,764	89.95%	0	0.00%
1956	174	8.59%	1,851	91.41%	0	0.00%
1960	220	11.26%	1,733	88.74%	0	0.00%
1964	1,662	53.05%	1,471	46.95%	0	0.00%
1968	454	14.48%	879	28.03%	1,803	57.49%
1972	1,904	76.34%	590	23.66%	0	0.00%
1976	655	21.16%	2,441	78.84%	0	0.00%
1980	1,083	30.93%	2,364	67.50%	55	1.57%
1984	1,435	45.40%	1,726	54.60%	0	0.00%
1988	1,386	45.88%	1,613	53.39%	22	0.73%
1992	1,034	30.53%	1,993	58.84%	360	10.63%
1996	990	31.33%	1,951	61.74%	219	6.93%
2000	1,588	45.11%	1,901	54.01%	31	0.88%
2004	1,853	48.18%	1,973	51.30%	20	0.52%
2008	1,991	47.85%	2,138	51.38%	32	0.77%
2012	1,985	46.14%	2,285	53.11%	32	0.74%
2016	1,951	50.56%	1,872	48.51%	36	0.93%
2020	2,159	52.58%	1,911	46.54%	36	0.88%
2024	2,243	53.70%	1,921	45.99%	13	0.31%

United States Senate election results for Dooly County, Georgia2
Year	Republican		Democratic		Third party(ies)	
Year	No.	%	No.	%	No.	%
2020	2,158	53.17%	1,826	44.99%	75	1.85%
2020	1,938	51.82%	1,802	48.18%	0	0.00%

United States Senate election results for Dooly County, Georgia3
Year	Republican		Democratic		Third party(ies)	
Year	No.	%	No.	%	No.	%
2020	1,041	25.99%	1,188	29.66%	1,776	44.34%
2020	1,932	51.60%	1,812	48.40%	0	0.00%
2022	1,784	54.44%	1,461	44.58%	32	0.98%
2022	1,645	53.88%	1,408	46.12%	0	0.00%

Georgia Gubernatorial election results for Dooly County
Year	Republican		Democratic		Third party(ies)	
Year	No.	%	No.	%	No.	%
2022	1,860	56.60%	1,416	43.09%	10	0.30%

== Notable people ==
- John Dooly after whom the county was named
- Rooney L. Bowen, Georgia businessman and politician
- George Busbee, governor of Georgia
- Walter F. George, U.S. Senator
- Jody Powell, press secretary and aide to Jimmy Carter
- Roger Kingdom, Olympic gold medalist in track and field
- David Ragan, NASCAR driver
- Keith Mumphery, NFL player
- Julian Webb, judge on the Georgia Court of Appeals and member of the Georgia State Senate.
- Myron Mixon, mayor of Unidilla and Barbequer

== See also ==
- National Register of Historic Places listings in Dooly County, Georgia
- List of counties in Georgia
