= Unadilla, Georgia =

- City
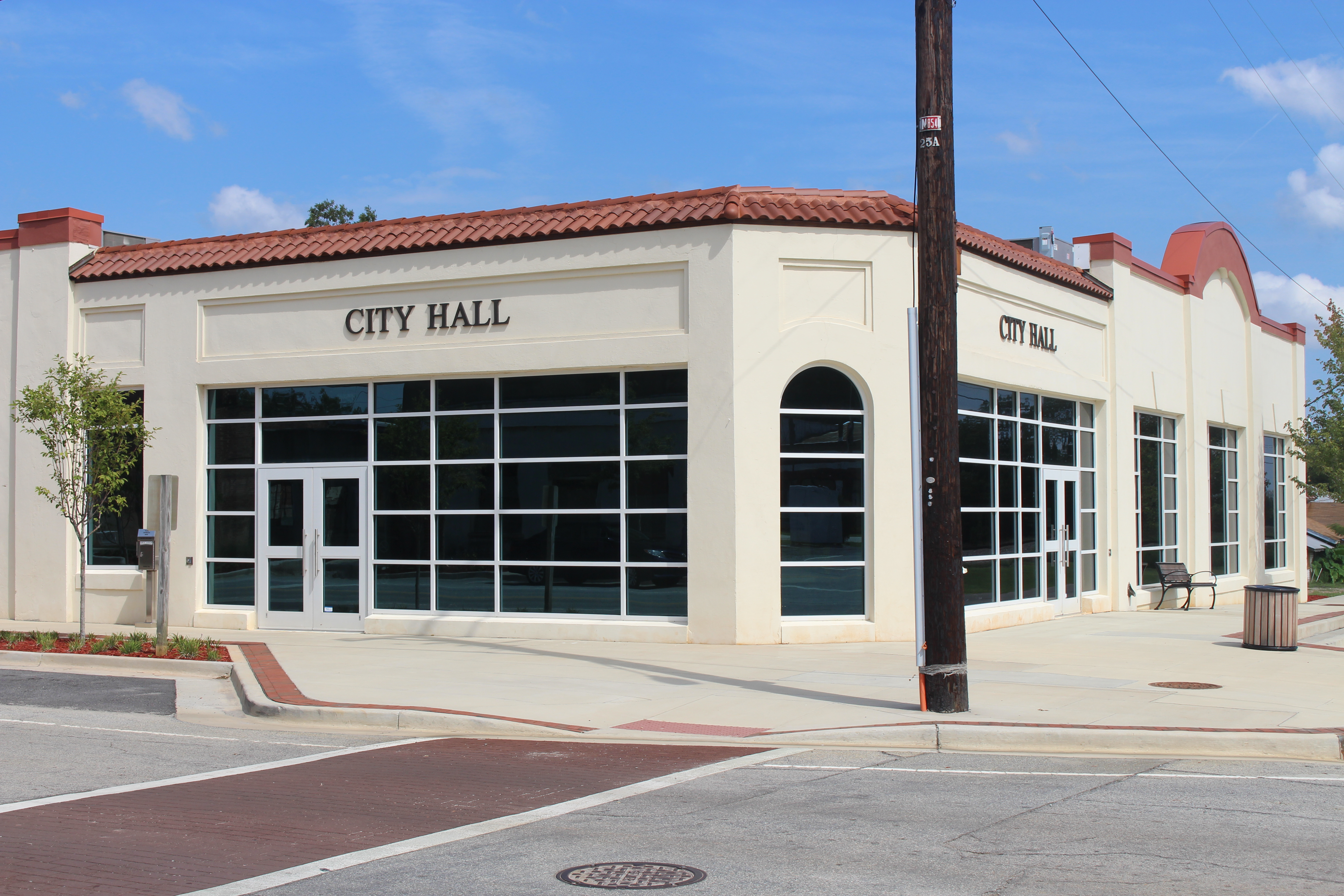
- City Hall in Unadilla

- Location in Dooly County and the state of Georgia
- Coordinates: 32°15′35″N 83°44′12″W
- Country: United States
- State: Georgia
- County: Dooly

Government
  - Mayor: Myron Mixon

Area
  - Total: 6.08 sq mi (15.75 km^{2})
  - Land: 6.04 sq mi (15.65 km^{2})
  - Water: 0.039 sq mi (0.10 km^{2})
- Elevation: 430 ft (130 m)

Population (2020)
  - Total: 3,118
  - Density: 516.0/sq mi (199.21/km^{2})
- Time zone: UTC-5 (Eastern (EST))
  - Summer (DST): UTC-4 (EDT)
- ZIP code: 31091
- Area code: 478
- FIPS code: 13-78156
- GNIS feature ID: 0333297
- Website: cityofunadillaga.com

Unadilla is a city in Dooly County, Georgia, United States. The population was 3,118 in 2020. Dooly State Prison is located in the northeast corner of the city.

== History ==
Unadilla is a name derived from the Iroquois language meaning "council place". The Georgia General Assembly incorporated Unadilla as a town in 1891. On December 31, 2006, an F2 tornado hit the outskirts of the city. Due to the implementation of the Enhanced Fujita Scale the next day this was the last tornado to be rated using the Fujita scale in the United States.

== Geography ==
Unadilla water tower

Unadilla is located in northern Dooly County at 32°15′35″N 83°44′12″W. U.S. Route 41 passes through the center of town as Pine Street, leading north 16 miles (26 km) to Perry and south 13 miles (21 km) to Vienna, the Dooly County seat. Interstate 75 passes through the west side of Unadilla, with access from Exits 121 and 122. I-75 leads north 43 miles (69 km) to Macon and south 61 miles (98 km) to Tifton. Georgia State Route 230 passes through Unadilla as Second Street and Borum Street, leading southwest 11 miles (18 km) to Byromville and east 18 miles (29 km) to Hawkinsville.

== Demographics ==
Historical population
Census	Pop.	Note	%±
1900	524		—
1910	1,003		91.4%
1920	2,019		101.3%
1930	1,832		−9.3%
1940	1,137		−37.9%
1950	1,098		−3.4%
1960	1,304		18.8%
1970	1,457		11.7%
1980	1,566		7.5%
1990	1,620		3.4%
2000	2,772		71.1%
2010	3,796		36.9%
2020	3,118		−17.9%
U.S. Decennial Census; 1850-1870 1870-1880; 1890-1910 1920-1930; 1940 1950 1960; 1970 1980 1990; 2000 2010

=== 2020 census ===
As of the 2020 census, Unadilla had a population of 3,118. The median age was 40.4 years. 11.2% of residents were under the age of 18 and 10.7% of residents were 65 years of age or older. For every 100 females there were 279.8 males, and for every 100 females age 18 and over there were 332.1 males age 18 and over.

Unadilla racial composition as of 2020
Race	Num.	Perc.
White (non-Hispanic)	836	26.81%
Black or African American (non-Hispanic)	2,028	65.04%
Native American	6	0.19%
Asian	8	0.26%
Other/Mixed	32	1.03%
Hispanic or Latino	208	6.67%

0.0% of residents lived in urban areas, while 100.0% lived in rural areas.

There were 618 households in Unadilla, of which 25.6% had children under the age of 18 living in them. Of all households, 26.2% were married-couple households, 21.4% were households with a male householder and no spouse or partner present, and 46.1% were households with a female householder and no spouse or partner present. About 37.2% of all households were made up of individuals and 17.7% had someone living alone who was 65 years of age or older.

There were 700 housing units, of which 11.7% were vacant. The homeowner vacancy rate was 1.4% and the rental vacancy rate was 7.1%.

== Notable events ==
Since 2017, Unadilla has been home to an annual New Year's Eve event entitled the Hog Drop, an evening celebration to ring in the new year. The event occurs in tandem with the Hog Drop Invitational BBQ competition, hosted and run by Unadilla mayor and BBQ pitmaster Myron Mixon. The event includes live music, fireworks, pig racing, and other family-friendly events. The event culminates in the lowering of a pig-shaped sign at the stroke of midnight, the action of which gives the event its name.

== Notable people ==
- David Ragan, NASCAR Cup Series driver
- Ken Ragan, former NASCAR and ARCA driver.
- Myron Mixon, five-time World BBQ Champion and mayor.
