= Vienna, Georgia =

- City
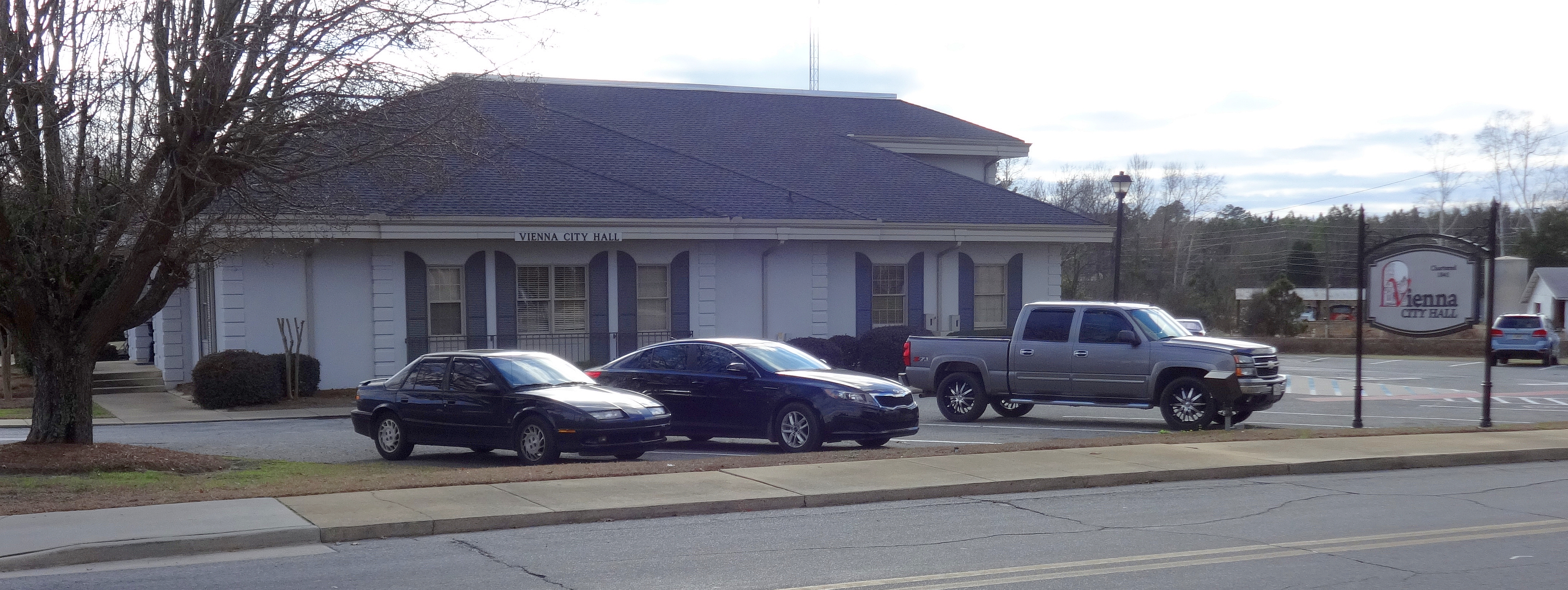
- Vienna City Hall

- Location in Dooly County and the state of Georgia
- Coordinates: 32°6′N 83°48′W
- Country: United States
- State: Georgia
- County: Dooly

Government
  - Mayor: Eddie Daniels

Area
  - Total: 5.58 sq mi (14.44 km^{2})
  - Land: 5.55 sq mi (14.37 km^{2})
  - Water: 0.027 sq mi (0.07 km^{2})
- Elevation: 331 ft (101 m)

Population (2020)
  - Total: 2,928
  - Density: 527.6/sq mi (203.72/km^{2})
- Time zone: UTC-5 (Eastern (EST))
  - Summer (DST): UTC-4 (EDT)
- ZIP code: 31092
- Area code: 229
- FIPS code: 13-79444
- GNIS feature ID: 0324707
- Website: www.cityofvienna.org

Vienna (/vaɪˈɛnə/) is a city in and the county seat of Dooly County, Georgia, United States. The population was 2,928 in 2020. Vienna is situated on the Flint River. It was established as Berrien in 1826. In 1833, its name was changed to Drayton. In 1841, it was renamed Vienna after the city of Vienna, Austria.

== History ==
Vienna was founded in 1826 as the seat of Dooly County as Berrien. Its name was later changed to Drayton and in 1836 it became the county seat. Renamed in 1841, Vienna was incorporated as a town in 1854 and as a city in 1901.

On October 4, 2026, a mass shooting broke out during a homecoming block party in Vienna, the county seat, leaving two people dead and 36 others injured. The attack ranks among the deadliest mass-casualty incidents ever recorded in the county.

== Geography ==
Vienna is located in southern Dooly County. U.S. Route 41 passes through the center of town as Third Street, leading north 13 miles (21 km) to Unadilla and south 9 miles (14 km) to Cordele. Interstate 75 passes 2 miles (3 km) east of the center of town (and forms the eastern border of the city), with access from Exits 109 and 112. I-75 leads north 55 miles (89 km) to Macon and south 49 miles (79 km) to Tifton.

According to the United States Census Bureau, Vienna has a total area of 5.5 square miles (14.2 km^{2}), of which 0.03 square miles (0.07 km^{2}), or 0.46%, is water.

=== Climate ===
The climate in this area is characterized by relatively high temperatures and evenly distributed precipitation throughout the year. According to the Köppen Climate Classification system, Vienna has a humid subtropical climate, abbreviated "Cfa" on climate maps.

Climate data for Vienna, Georgia(1981-2010 normals)
Month	Jan	Feb	Mar	Apr	May	Jun	Jul	Aug	Sep	Oct	Nov	Dec	Year
Mean daily maximum °F (°C)	58.7 (14.8)	62.5 (16.9)	69.7 (20.9)	77.1 (25.1)	84.3 (29.1)	89.8 (32.1)	92.0 (33.3)	91.3 (32.9)	86.5 (30.3)	78.1 (25.6)	69.5 (20.8)	60.4 (15.8)	76.7 (24.8)
Daily mean °F (°C)	46.8 (8.2)	49.9 (9.9)	56.3 (13.5)	63.6 (17.6)	72.2 (22.3)	78.7 (25.9)	81.4 (27.4)	80.8 (27.1)	75.2 (24.0)	65.4 (18.6)	56.5 (13.6)	48.4 (9.1)	64.6 (18.1)
Mean daily minimum °F (°C)	34.8 (1.6)	37.2 (2.9)	42.9 (6.1)	50.0 (10.0)	60.1 (15.6)	67.6 (19.8)	70.7 (21.5)	70.2 (21.2)	63.9 (17.7)	52.7 (11.5)	43.5 (6.4)	36.3 (2.4)	52.5 (11.4)
Average precipitation inches (mm)	4.72 (120)	4.19 (106)	4.96 (126)	3.37 (86)	3.73 (95)	4.41 (112)	5.47 (139)	3.78 (96)	3.66 (93)	2.77 (70)	3.49 (89)	3.91 (99)	48.46 (1,231)

== Demographics ==
Historical population
Census	Pop.	Note	%±
1890	536		—
1900	1,035		93.1%
1910	1,003		−3.1%
1920	1,103		10.0%
1930	1,203		9.1%
1940	2,063		71.5%
1950	2,202		6.7%
1960	2,099		−4.7%
1970	2,341		11.5%
1980	2,886		23.3%
1990	2,708		−6.2%
2000	2,973		9.8%
2010	4,011		34.9%
2020	2,928		−27.0%
U.S. Decennial Census; 1850-1870 1870-1880; 1890-1910 1920-1930; 1940 1950 1960; 1970 1980 1990; 2000 2010

=== 2020 census ===
As of the 2020 census, Vienna had a population of 2,928. The median age was 38.5 years. 26.4% of residents were under the age of 18 and 16.5% were 65 years of age or older. For every 100 females there were 82.0 males, and for every 100 females age 18 and over there were 75.9 males age 18 and over.

0.0% of residents lived in urban areas, while 100.0% lived in rural areas.

There were 1,213 households in Vienna, of which 31.2% had children under the age of 18 living in them. Of all households, 27.4% were married-couple households, 19.0% were households with a male householder and no spouse or partner present, and 47.0% were households with a female householder and no spouse or partner present. About 34.3% of all households were made up of individuals and 14.0% had someone living alone who was 65 years of age or older.

There were 1,405 housing units, of which 13.7% were vacant. The homeowner vacancy rate was 1.0% and the rental vacancy rate was 10.4%.

Vienna racial composition as of 2020
Race	Num.	Perc.
White (non-Hispanic)	439	14.99%
Black or African American (non-Hispanic)	2,078	70.97%
Native American	10	0.34%
Asian	13	0.44%
Pacific Islander	1	0.03%
Other/Mixed	36	1.23%
Hispanic or Latino	351	11.99%

== Arts and culture ==
The Big Pig Jig takes place in Vienna. It is the Southeast's largest and Georgia's oldest official barbecue cooking contest. The Big Pig Jig was named to the Discovery Travel Channel's top ten list of "World's Best Barbecue Contests" for four consecutive years (2002–2005).

The Georgia State Cotton Museum is located in Vienna.

== Education ==
The Dooly County School District holds pre-school to grade twelve, and consists of one elementary school, a middle school, and a high school. The district has 92 full-time teachers and over 1,545 students. The schools are:

- Fullington Academy
- Dooly County Elementary School
- Dooly County Middle School
- Dooly County High School

== Notable people ==
Vienna is the birthplace of Georgia governor George Busbee and the late Hollywood film director Vincent Sherman. Another notable person from Vienna is Roger Kingdom, winner of two Olympic gold medals. Florida legislator Perry Earl Murray was born in Vienna.

Former left fielder for the Cincinnati Reds and Los Angeles Dodgers Kal Daniels was born in Vienna. NFL player Travis Centel Glover Jr. was born in and grew up in Vienna.

== See also ==
- List of county seats in Georgia (U.S. state)
- 2026 Vienna, Georgia, shooting
