= Lily (disambiguation) =

Lily, Lilium, is a genus of flowering plants with large flowers.

Lily may also refer to:

- List of plants known as lily

== Arts and entertainment ==
=== Film and television ===
- The Lily (film), a 1926 American drama
- Lily (2013 film), an American drama film
- Lily (2023 film), an Indian Telugu-language children's film
- Lily (1973 special), an American television special
- "Lily" (Once Upon a Time), a 2015 episode from the TV series
- "Lily", a 1994 episode of the TV series Diagnosis Murder
- Lily: A Longitudinal View of Life with Down Syndrome, a 3-part TV documentary
- Lily, aime-moi, a 1975 French film
- Poison Ivy II: Lily, a 1996 thriller film

=== Literature ===
- Lily (novel), a 2021 novel by Rose Tremain
- "The Lilly" (poem), a 1794 poem by English poet William Blake, about the flower
- The Lily (newspaper) (1849–1853), the first U.S. newspaper edited by and for women
- The Lily (Washington Post), a publication of the Washington Post

=== Music ===
- Lily (band), Philippine pop-rock band
- Lily (Wendy Matthews album), 1992
- Lily (Christy Moore album), 2016
- "L.I.L.Y. (Like I Love You)", a 2008 single by Belgian singer Kate Ryan
- "Lily", a 2018 song by Alan Walker featuring K-391 and Emelie Hollow

== People ==
- Lily (name), a feminine given name
- Lily (singer, born 2002), South Korean and Australian singer
- Lily (Japanese singer) (1952–2016)

== Places ==
- Lily, Kentucky, U.S.
- Lily, South Dakota, U.S.
- Lily, Wisconsin, U.S.
- Lily Bay, a bay in Maine, U.S.
- The Lily, Stirling Range, a windmill in Western Australia

== Ships ==
- HMS Lily, the name of several Royal Navy ships
- PS Lily (1880), a British paddle steamer passenger vessel
- USS Lily (1862), a Union Navy steam tugboat during the American Civil War
- Lily (HBC vessel), operated by the HBC from 1877 to 1883, see Hudson's Bay Company vessels
- Lily (1882 ship), a two-masted schooner (1882) used in the 1935 film Mutiny on the Bounty as HMS Bounty

== Other uses ==
- Lily (elephant), an elephant at the Oregon Zoo
- Lily (magazine), a Spanish women's magazine
- Lily (software), a female vocal originally released for Vocaloid 2
- Kawasaki Ki-48, a Japanese World War II light bomber named "Lily" by the Allies
- Fleur-de-lis, a stylised lily

== See also ==
- Lili (disambiguation)
- Lilies (disambiguation)
- Lilium (disambiguation)
- Lille (disambiguation)
- Lilley (disambiguation)
- Lilli (disambiguation)
- Lillie (disambiguation)
- Lilly (disambiguation)
- Lily Lake (disambiguation)
- Lily Pond (disambiguation)
- Easter lily (disambiguation)
- Gilded Lily (disambiguation)
- Hurricane Lily (disambiguation)
- Princess Lily (disambiguation)
