= Lily Lake =

Lily Lake may refer to:

== Canada ==
- Lily Lake (Nova Scotia), one of several lakes in Nova Scotia
- Lily Lake, a lake in Rockwood Park, Saint John, New Brunswick
- Lily Lake (Sioux Narrows-Nestor Falls), Ontario
- Lily Lake (Peterborough County), Ontario
- Lily Lake (Cardwell Township, Muskoka Lakes), Ontario
- Lily Lake (Blind River), Ontario
- Lily Lake (Timiskaming District), Ontario
- Lily Lake (Monck Township, Muskoka Lakes), Ontario
- Lily Lake (Manitoulin District), Ontario
- Lily Lake (Lake of the Woods, Kenora District), Ontario
- Lily Lake (Delmage Township, Sudbury District), Ontario
- Lily Lake (Cochrane District), Ontario
- Lily Lake (Rainy River District), Ontario
- Lily Lake (St.-Charles), Ontario
- Lily Lake (Parry Sound District), Ontario
- Lily Lake (Hornepayne), Ontario
- Lily Lake (Lennox and Addington County), Ontario
- Lily Lake (Pistol Lake, Kenora District), Ontario
- Lily Lake (Thunder Bay District), Ontario
- Lily Lake (Sioux Lookout), Ontario

== United States ==
- Lily Lake (Florida), a lake inside Lily Lake Golf Resort, in southern Polk County, Florida
- Lily Lake (Blue Earth County, Minnesota)
- Lily Lake, a lake in Waseca County, Minnesota
- Lily Lake (Washington County, Minnesota)
- Lily Lake (New York)
- Lily Lake (Idaho), a lake in Custer County
- Lily Lake, Illinois, a town in western Kane County
- Lily Lake (Pennsylvania), a lake in Luzerne County
- Lily Lake, Wisconsin, an unincorporated community

== See also ==
- Lily Pond (disambiguation)
