= Lilli =

Lilli may refer to:

== Films ==
- Lilli (1919 film), a German film
- Lilli (1958 film), a West German film directed by Hermann Leitner
- Lilli (2018 film), an Indian film

== Places ==
- Lilli, Harju County, a village in Anija Parish, Harju County, Estonia
- Lilli, Viljandi County, a village in Mulgi Parish, Viljandi County, Estonia

== Other uses ==
- Lilli (comic strip), a West German comic-strip from the newspaper Bild
  - Bild Lilli doll, a West German fashion doll based on the comic-strip above

== People with the given name ==
- Lilli Cooper (born 1990), American actress
- Lilli Halttunen (born 2005), Finnish footballer
- Lilli Henoch (1899–1942), German track and field athlete
- Lilli Lehmann (1848–1929), German operatic soprano
- Lilli Promet (1922–2007), Estonian writer
- Lilli Suburg (1841–1923), Estonian journalist, writer and feminist
- Lilli Tagger (born 2008), Austrian tennis player

== See also ==
- Lili (disambiguation)
- Lille (disambiguation)
- Lilley (disambiguation)
- Lillie (disambiguation)
- Lillis (disambiguation)
- Lilly (disambiguation)
- Lily (disambiguation)
