= Lilly =

Lilly may refer to:

== Arts and entertainment ==
- Lilly (1958 film), a Malayalam film
- Lilly (2024 film), an American drama film
- Lilly (album), by Antonello Venditti, 1975
  - "Lilly" (song), the lead single of the album
- "Lilly", a song by Moby, from his 2005 album Hotel Ambient
- "Lilly", a song by Pink Martini from the 2004 album Hang On Little Tomato
- Lilly the Witch, or Lilly in the UK, an animated TV show
- The Lilly (poem), a 1794 poem by William Blake

== People and fictional characters ==
- Lilly (given name), a list of people and fictional characters
- Lilly (surname), a list of people
- Lilly K, pseudonym of American dancer and YouTuber Lilliana Ketchman (born 2008)

== Places ==
=== France ===
- Lilly, Eure, a commune

=== United States ===
- Lilly, Georgia, a city
  - Lilly Historic District
- Lilly, Missouri, an unincorporated community
- Lilly, Pennsylvania, a borough
- Lilly, Virginia, an unincorporated community
- Lilly, West Virginia, a ghost town

== Other uses ==
- Eli Lilly and Company, an American pharmaceutical corporation
- Lilly Prize (disambiguation)
- Swallow (1779 EIC packet), a packet ship purchased by the Royal Navy and renamed Lilly

== See also ==
- Lili (disambiguation)
- Lille (disambiguation)
- Lilley (disambiguation)
- Lilli (disambiguation)
- Lillie (disambiguation)
- Lily (disambiguation)
