= Lille (disambiguation) =

Lille is a city in northern France.

Lille may also refer to:

== Places ==
- Lille, Belgium
- Lille, Alberta, Canada
- Arrondissement of Lille, France
- Lille, Grand Isle, Maine, U.S.

== Other uses ==
- Lille (song), by Lisa Hannigan, 2008
- Lille OSC, a French football club based in Lille
  - Lille OSC (women), women's department of the above
- Lisle (textiles), a kind of thread or fabric originally produced in Lille
- Lille Storberg (born 1945), Norwegian handball player

== Fiction ==
- Lillie (Pokémon), fictional character in the Pokémon franchise

== See also ==
- Lili (disambiguation)
- Lilley (disambiguation)
- Lilli (disambiguation)
- Lillie (disambiguation)
- Lilly (disambiguation)
- Lily (disambiguation)
