= Barbieland: The Unauthorized History =

Barbieland: The Unauthorized History is a 2025 non-fiction book by journalist Tarpley Hitt that explores the history of the Barbie doll and the corporate tactics of Mattel, including challenging the official origin story of the barbie doll being created by Ruth Handler but actually was near-identical to the German Bild Lilli doll.
