= Monica & David =

- Directed by: Alexandra Codina
- Produced by: Deborah Dickson; Alexandra Codina
- Cinematography: David Fenster; Juan Carlos Zaldívar; Abel Klainbaum
- Edited by: Mary Manhardt; Paola Gutierrez-Ortiz
- Music by: Steven Schoenberg
- Release dates: November 22, 2009 (IDFA); July 23, 2010 (United States)
- Running time: 68 minutes
- Country: United States
- Language: English

Monica & David is a 2009 documentary by Alexandra Codina. The film focuses on the daily lives of Monica and David, a young married couple with Down syndrome. The film premiered on November 22, 2009 at IDFA and has won Best Documentary Feature at the 2010 Tribeca Film Festival. Monica & David later had a television premiere on HBO on October 14, 2010.

== Synopsis ==
The documentary begins with Monica and David talking to each other via the phone a few days before the wedding. They are shown to be eager to wed and live together with Monica's mother Maria Elena and her stepfather Bob. Their wedding is large and beautiful, and the couple exchanges vows before retiring to their honeymoon suite. Afterwards they leave on their honeymoon, where they are accompanied by Monica's parents. As the documentary progresses Codina shows viewers the couple's large support network, which includes people with and without Down syndrome. It also highlights that while Monica and David are both aware that they have some differences from other people, they view themselves as the same as someone without Downs. Later in the documentary Codina records the couple's move to Hollywood Beach, Florida, as Bob is retiring. The move is initially largely uneventful, although Monica does take some time to adapt. During the footage shot while the move is progressing, we learn that David has been diagnosed with type 1 diabetes and requires several shots a day to keep his insulin levels under control. Monica details the changes in David's life, which involves a healthier diet as she does not want him to fall into a coma or require hospitalization, which is how the diagnosis was discovered. As the family becomes settled in their new home, David expresses his desire to find work and become more independent. This prompts Maria Elena to reflect on her own protectiveness of Monica and David, as she knows that while she wants to protect them from the world that being overly protective will not benefit them in the long run, especially after she and Bob die. The documentary ends with Monica and David happily celebrating their one year anniversary at a local restaurant while the wait staff serenade the two and clap.

== Cast ==
- Monica Walters
- David Martinez
- Maria
- Maria Elena Walters
- Bob Walters

== Production ==
Codina, who is Monica's first cousin, was inspired to create the documentary after seeing varied responses to the announcement of David and Monica's wedding from people with and without Down syndrome. Some viewed the marriage as a "cute gesture between kids" and as Codina saw the ceremony as "something very powerful, very serious and very adult", she hoped that documenting the pair would enable people to see this perspective as well. In order to record footage Codina borrowed a digital video camera and filmed the couple and their family in the days leading up to the wedding as well as the ceremony itself. Codina recorded 30 hours of wedding related footage in addition to footage that she recorded afterwards between 2007 and 2009. After filming was complete Codina left her job as programmer for the Miami International Film Festival to focus on the production of the documentary. She pitched a nine-minute development trailer to HBO, who decided to support the endeavor.

== Reception ==
Critical reception for Monica & David has been positive, and Boston.com praised Codina for the intimacy they felt with Monica, David, and their family. Variety also enjoyed the film, and commented "Neither overly sentimental nor insistently uplifting, “Monica & David,” Alexandra Codina’s confidently directed, expertly edited docu about the marriage of two people with Down syndrome, proves unexpectedly engrossing."

=== Awards ===
- Best Documentary Feature at the Tribeca Film Festival (2010, won)
- Outstanding Informational Programming - Long Form at the News & Documentary Emmy Awards (2010, nominated)

== See also ==
- Lily: A Longitudinal View of Life with Down Syndrome
