= Lilium (disambiguation) =

Lilium is the plant genus of "true lilies".

Lilium may also refer to:

- the Latin term for the fleur-de-lis emblem
- Lilium (constellation), a constellation defined by Augustin Royer in 1679
- 1092 Lilium, a minor planet, discovered in 1924
- Lilium (band), a French-American band
- "Lilium", the opening theme song from the anime Elfen Lied
- Lilium GmbH, a German start-up developing an electric airplane
  - Lilium Jet, an electric airplane developed by Lilium
- Lilium Tower, a proposed skyscraper project for Warsaw, Poland

== See also ==
- Lily (disambiguation)
