= Muppberg =

Mountain in Bavaria, Germany

- Location within Bavaria Location within Germany

Highest point
- Elevation: 515.7 m (1,692 ft)
- Coordinates: 50°19′32″N 11°08′25″E

Geography
- Location: Bavaria, Germany

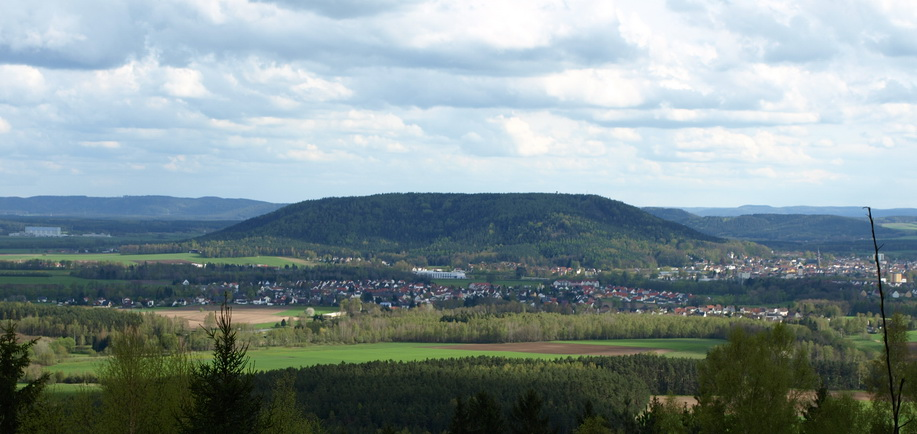
The Muppberg from afar

The Muppberg, not to be confused with the nearby district called Mupperg of the municipality of Föritztal, is a 515.7-meter-high (1,692 ft) mountain located in Bavaria between Neustadt bei Coburg, Sonneberg and Heubisch. On January 1, 1975, the 204-hectare (500-acre) forest district of Muppberg (Neustadter Forst), which is not part of the municipality, was incorporated into Neustadt from the Coburg domain. On the summit stands the Arnoldhütte, a refuge named after Max Oscar Arnold, and next to it the Prinzregententurm.

The Muppberg is accessible by many hiking trails.

== Prinzregententurm ==
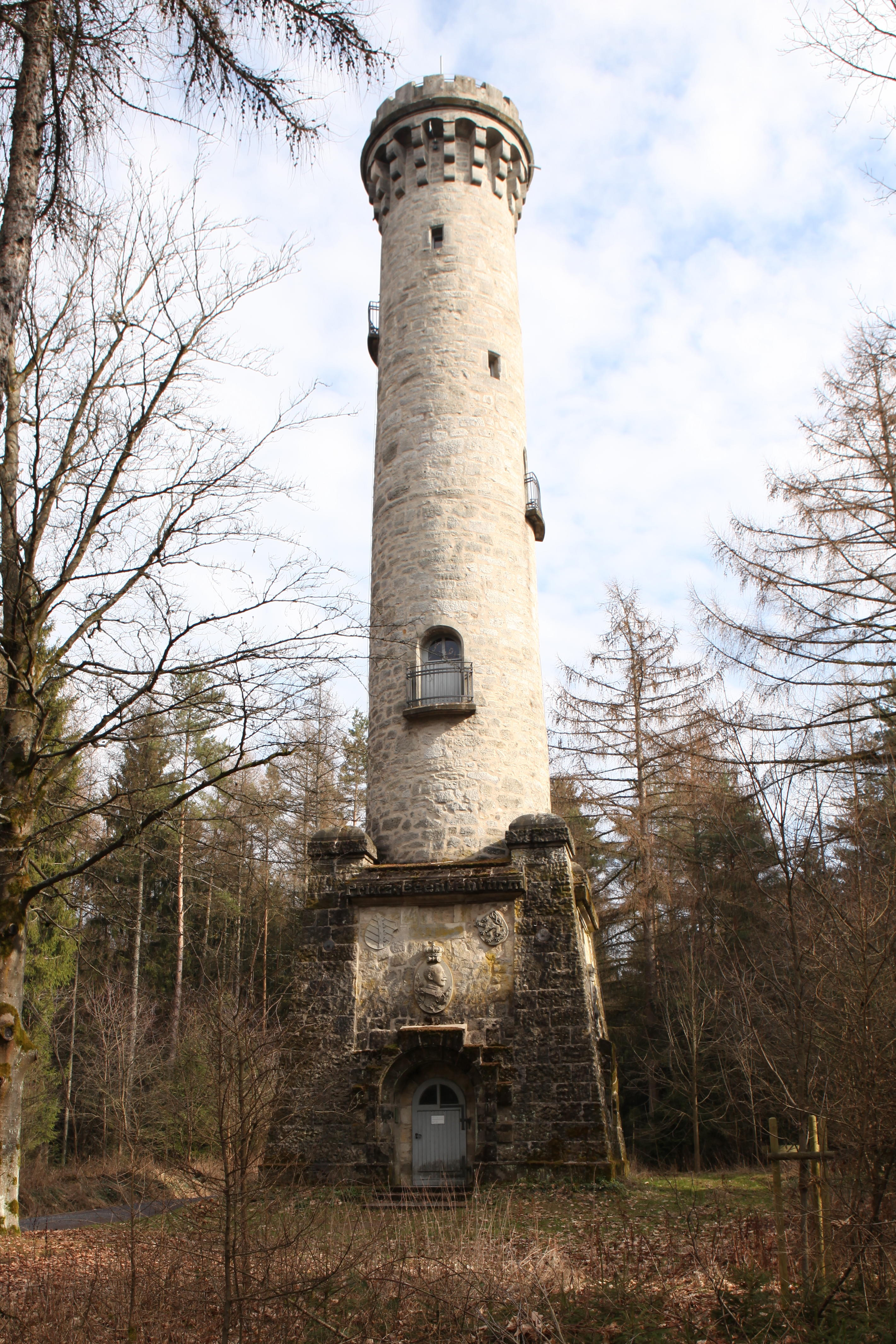
Prinzregententurm on the Muppberg

On the initiative of Max Oscar Arnold, the Verschönerungsverein Neustadt (Improvement Association of Neustadt) erected the 28-meter-high (92 ft) observation tower. The construction costs of 12,500 German marks were paid for by collections and donations. The tower, which was inaugurated on June 4, 1905, was named after Ernst II, Prince of Hohenlohe-Langenburg, who, after the death of his father-in-law Duke Alfred on July 30, 1900, was in charge of the government of the duchies of Saxe-Coburg and Gotha until July 18, 1905, on behalf of Charles Edward (German: Carl Eduard), who was still underage. The round tower made of sandstone in Art Nouveau style has a pedestal with reliefs by the sculptor Emil Bunzel based on designs by Max Derra depicting Prince Regent Ernst zu Hohenlohe-Langenburg on the west side, Duke Ernest II (German: Ernst II) on the east side, Duke Alfred on the north side and Duke Charles Edward on the south side. The mason Bernhard Bosecker was responsible for the construction. The design came from his son Julius Bosecker.

== Arnoldhütte ==
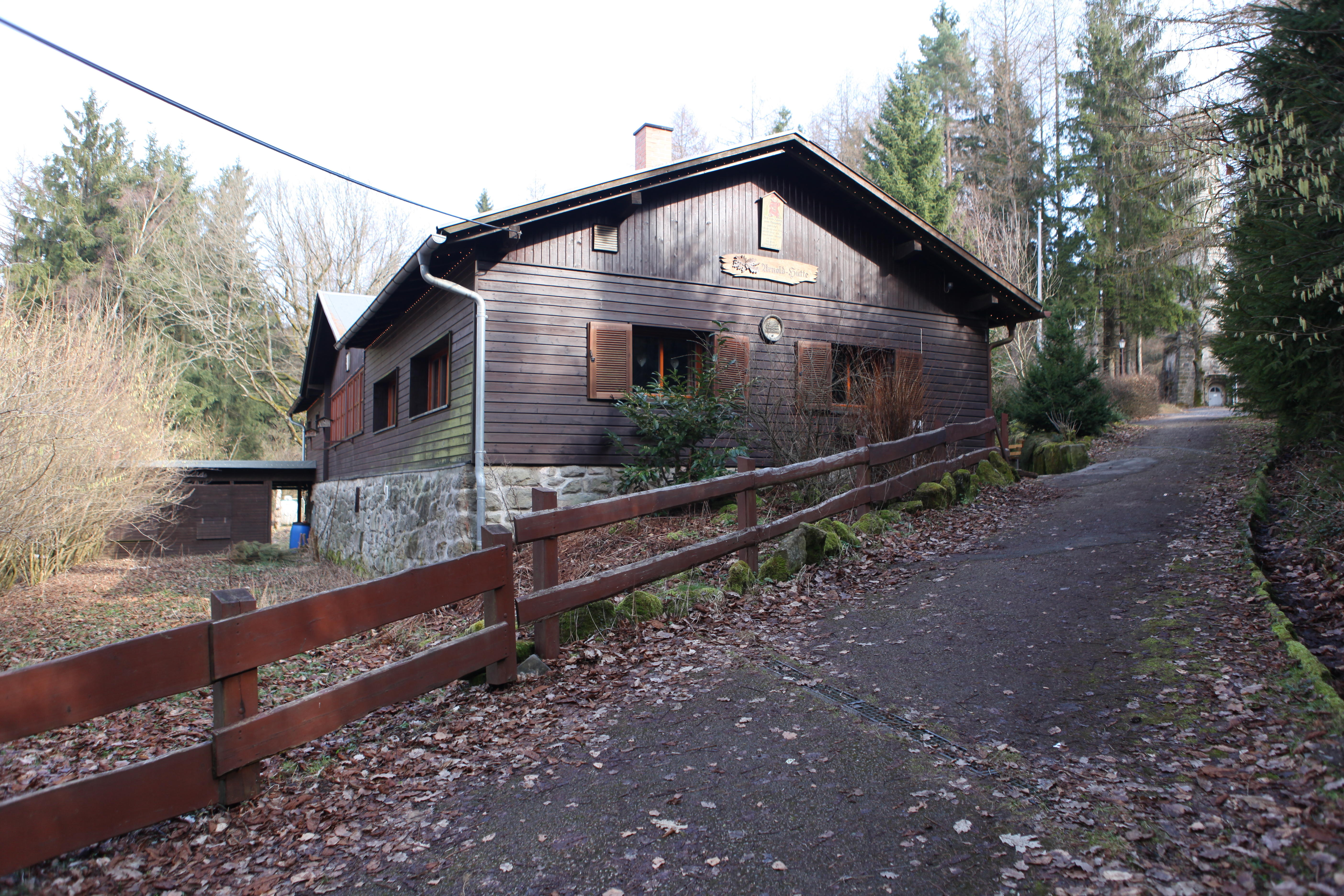
Arnoldhütte on the Muppberg

In 1926, the Verschönerungsverein Neustadt had a shelter built on the Muppberg. The log cabin cost 2600 German marks and was inaugurated on May 16, 1926. It has been officially called Arnoldhütte since 1932. After the expansion followed the year-round management.

== Ottilienkapelle ==
In the past, the Ottilienkapelle (Ottilien chapel) stood on the Muppberg, which was likely founded after 1071. There is indirect evidence of the existence of the chapel from 1343. In the 16th century the chapel was a place of pilgrimage. After the introduction of the Reformation, the pilgrimage church was demolished in 1533.
