= Princess Lily =

Princess Lily may refer to:

- Princess lily (Alstroemeria psittacina), an ornamental plant
- Himeyuri students, or Lily Princesses, a nursing unit for the Imperial Japanese Army during the Battle of Okinawa in 1945
- Ice Princess Lily, American version of Tabaluga, a German animated fantasy family film, featuring Princess Lilli
- Princess Lily, a fictional character in the 2009 Jessica Day George novel Princess of the Midnight Ball
- Princess Lily Wentworth, a fictional character from the 2011 Heather Dixon novel Entwined
- Luziannan princess Lily Borjarno, a fictional character from Turn A Gundam, 1999

== See also ==
- Lily (disambiguation)
- List of fictional princesses
