= Lilies (disambiguation) =

Lilies are members of Lilium, a genus of herbaceous flowering plants.

Lilies may also refer to:

- Lilies (film), a 1996 Canadian film by John Greyson
- Lilies (play), a 1987 play by Michel Marc Bouchard
- Lilies (TV series), a 2007 British period-drama series
- Lilies (Arovane album) or the title song, 2004
- Lilies (Melanie De Biasio album) or the title song, 2017
- "Lilies", a song by Bat for Lashes from The Haunted Man, 2012
- "Lilies", a 1958 short story by Ru Zhijuan
- Lilys, an American rock band

== See also ==
- Lily (disambiguation)
