= Lillie =

Lillie or Lilie may refer to:

- Lillie (name)
- Lillie (TV series), 1978 British television serial
- Lillie, Louisiana, village in the United States
- Lilie (poem), in Kytice, anthology by Karel Jaromír Erben
- Lillie Glacier, glacier of Antarctica
- Lillie Range, mountain range of Antarctica
- Lillie Bridge Grounds, a sports ground in London
- Lillie (Pokémon), a Pokémon character
- Lillie (pilot boat), pilot boat renamed the Richard K. Fox

== See also ==
- Lili (disambiguation)
- Lille (disambiguation)
- Lilley (disambiguation)
- Lilli (disambiguation)
- Lillie Langtry (horse), Irish Thoroughbred racehorse
- Lilly (disambiguation)
- Lily (disambiguation)
