= Gilded Lily =

Gilded Lily or The Gilded Lily may refer to:

== Books and literature ==
- Gilded Lily (character), a Marvel Comics supervillain character
- The Case of the Gilded Lily, a 1956 novel in the Perry Mason series by Erle Stanley Gardner
- The Gilded Lily, a 2012 historical novel by Deborah Swift
- Gilded Lily, a 2014 novel by Delphine Dryden

== Film and television ==
- The Gilded Lily (1921 film), starring Mae Murray
- The Gilded Lily (1935 film), starring Claudette Colbert

== Music ==
- "Gilded Lily", a 1992 song by Gwar from America Must Be Destroyed
- "Gilded Lily", a 2017 song by Cults from Offering

== See also ==
- Gild the Lily, a 1991 album by Chantoozies
