= Lili =

Lili may refer to:

== People ==
- Lili (given name), for a list of people with the given name or nickname

== Other uses ==
- Lili (1953 film), a musical starring Leslie Caron and Mel Ferrer
- Lili (Tekken), a character from the Tekken fighting game series
- Lilin (singular Lili), legendary demons in Mesopotamian mythology and Hebrew folklore
- Lili (1917 film), a Hungarian film reportedly featuring Béla Lugosi
- Lili (feline), the offspring of a liger and a lion
- Lili, an 1882 opéra bouffe by Hervé
- Lili, a fictional fairy in La Corda d'Oro (Kiniro no Corda)
- List of storms named Lili

== See also ==
- Li Li (disambiguation)
- Lille (disambiguation)
- Lilley (disambiguation)
- Lilli (disambiguation)
- Lillie (disambiguation)
- Lilly (disambiguation)
- Lily (disambiguation)
