= Steven Schoenberg =

American songwriter

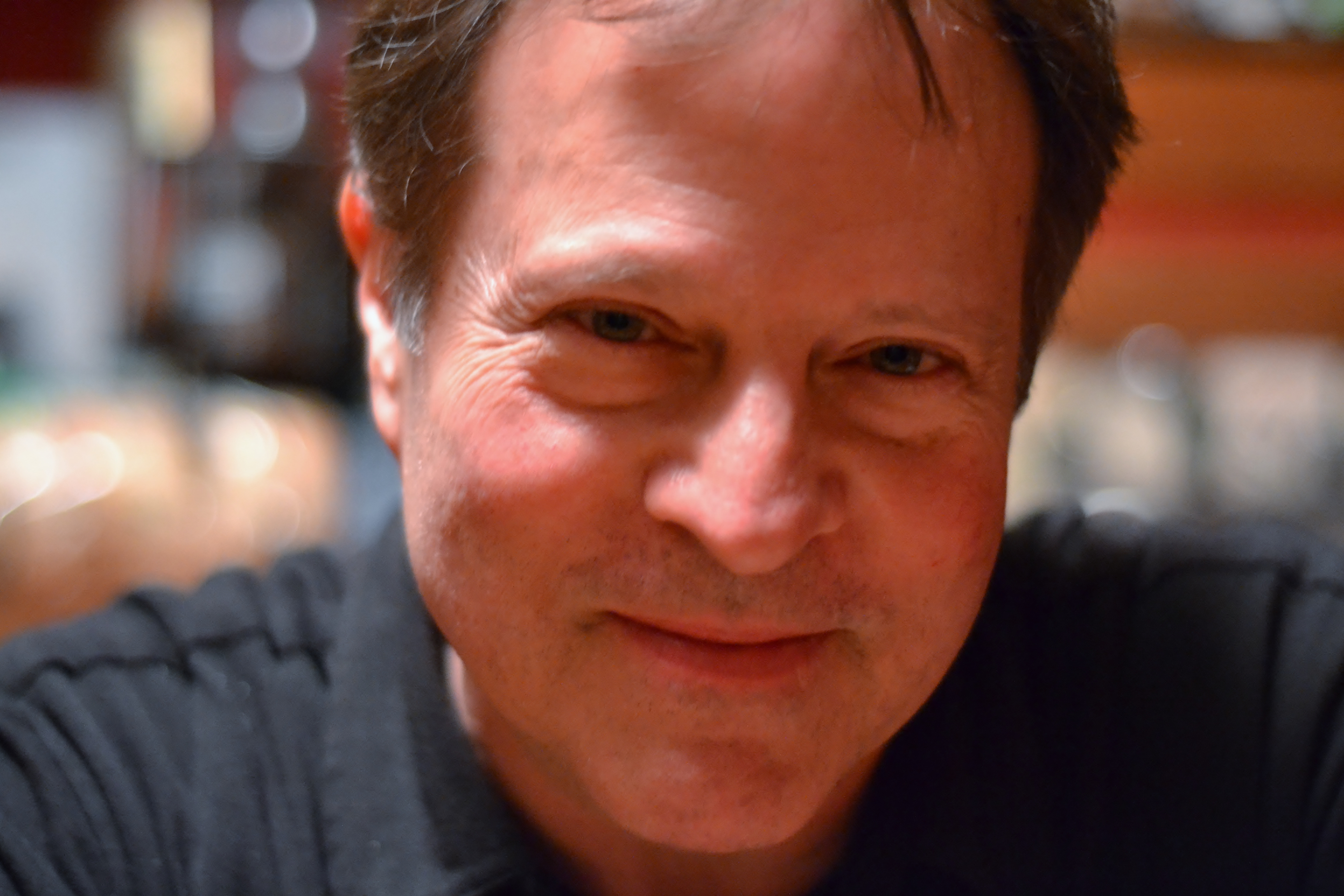
- Schoenberg after a performance at Sweeney Concert Hall, Smith College, Northampton, Massachusetts, on March 16, 2012.

Background information
- Born: October 17, 1952 (age 73); Springfield, Massachusetts
- Occupations: Composer, songwriter, film composer, pianist
- Instrument: Piano
- Website: stevenschoenberg.com

Steven Schoenberg (born October 17, 1952) is an American composer, songwriter, film composer, and pianist. His work includes film scores for Emmy Award-winning films, classical compositions, children's music, and musical theater. As of 2015 he has recorded four noted albums of piano improvisations. Schoenberg is co-founder and CEO at Learn With A Beat, LLC, and with his wife, children's book author Jane Schoenberg, develops educational apps for children. They have two children, actress Sarah Kate Jackson and composer Adam Schoenberg.

== Background ==
Schoenberg studied classical piano from age seven through his years at The Hartt School, where he received a Bachelor of Music degree in Music Composition in 1975. At Hartt, Schoenberg studied with Arnold Franchetti and Norman Dinerstein. Schoenberg started improvising on the piano at age two and played "God Bless America" for his nursery school graduation. When he was twelve, Schoenberg's parents took him to see Fiddler on the Roof on Broadway. After that experience, he composed his first song, setting music to Edgar Allan Poe's poem Annabel Lee, and joined his first rock band, performing on one of the original Farfisa organs. In 1971, at Hartt, Schoenberg helped form NSH a rock trio first produced by Fred Hellerman of The Weavers. After graduating, he left the band and landed a job in Manhattan, writing television and radio commercials for music production agency Sherman and Kahn.

== Career ==
For children's television, Schoenberg has composed songs for Sesame Street and scored animations for the Children's Television Workshop's 3-2-1 Contact and short films for the 1999 PBS TV series Zoom. In 2005, he composed music for the award-winning children's book and CD My Bodyworks, written by his wife, Jane. He was one of the executive producers as well as musical director and composer for Kid Quest, a children's TV pilot airing on WGBY-TV/PBS. It won the 2007 New England Emmy Awards for Best Director and Outstanding Children's Program. In 2014, Steven and Jane formed Learn With A Beat, LLC, partnering with 21iLab, located in Zürich, Switzerland, and Ho Chi Minh City, Vietnam, to produce and develop interactive and educational iOS, and Android apps, whose mission is to inspire and challenge young children. Their debut series, My Bodyworks, designed for five- to nine-year-olds, launches in 2015, inviting kids to understand and discover how their bodies work, in playful and creative ways.

As a musical theater composer, Schoenberg saw his first musical, It's 11:59, written with Songwriters Hall of Fame lyricist Edward Eliscu, premiere in August 1980 at Lucille Lortel's The White Barn in Westport, Connecticut. In 2001, Schoenberg's musical, Haunted—book by Marilyn Stasio, lyrics by Diane Seymour—had a reading at New York University produced by Goodspeed Opera House, East Haddam, Connecticut. Also in 2001, Family Album: A Musical Reminiscence, a dramatic song cycle for eight performers, with poetry by Paul Mariani, premiered at The York Theatre Company, Citicorp Center, New York City, directed by Michael Montel. In 2004, The Independent, a musical with book and lyrics by Steven Scott Smith, based on the occult film of the same name, had a reading at CAP21 in New York City.

His recent film scores include the POV/PBS documentary, Farmingville (2004); A Class Apart (2009), for the PBS series American Experience; the HBO documentary Monica & David (2009); and the feature film Graceland (2012), which he scored with his son, Adam Schoenberg, premiering at the Tribeca Film Festival.

In concert, Schoenberg is best known for his piano improvisations. A 2010 review in Time Out New York described Schoenberg as "a pianist with a staunch commitment to pure improvisation," performing "heartfelt solo pieces that range from the bluesy to the rhapsodic."

== Recordings ==
=== 1980–2000 ===
Schoenberg recorded his first album of piano improvisations after Western MA-based radio station WRSI began airing a tape recording of a concert he had performed, opening for David Mallett. Because of the overwhelming response from that radio play, Schoenberg produced a concert at Buckley Recital Hall at Amherst College in December 1982. The concert sold out in less than 24 hours. Schoenberg asked renowned recording engineer Pat Jacques to record the concert, and Jacques brought in the Live From Lincoln Center sound truck. Schoenberg subsequently formed Quabbin Records in 1983 and released Pianoworks (Quabbin 1001), with selections from the concert. It debuted on Radio & Records Jazz National Airplay chart March 15, 1985 at Number 28, ultimately reaching Number 9. After its release, National Public Radio's Lee Thornton said, "I think Steven's music is some of the most incomparably beautiful music I've ever heard. When I listen, I am transported… to someplace very peaceful. If I were to be banished to an island and could take music, his would be among what I'd choose… and if there were only two choices, Schoenberg would be one!"

In 1984, Schoenberg recorded his second Quabbin album, Three Days in May (Quabbin 1002) at Dick Burwen's sound studio in Lexington, Massachusetts. Co-produced by Schoenberg and David Sokol, the album received widespread praise. The album was named among 1985's Top 10 records in The Boston Globe. A review in Down Beat referred to the album as "an eloquent, lush, and flowing series of improvisations that are spliced together to form sequential states of mind. (Schoenberg) claims that the performances are completely spontaneous, and if that's so, they are within strict melodic and rhythmic frameworks." Reflecting on his early career, a Hearts of Space article described Schoenberg as:

... an artist of brilliance, power, lyricism, and subtlety. He has been compared—erroneously, he feels—to Keith Jarrett (for his improvisational genius) and George Winston (for his melodic skill). But he is even broader—you can hear Wolfgang Amadeus Mozart and George Gershwin, Scott Joplin and Sergei Rachmaninoff. Within a few phrases, Schoenberg moves effortlessly among styles, spanning centuries and traditions. Though his technical skill is at times breathtaking, it is the addition of a deep and authentic heart quality, and his ability to project emotions, that make his work irresistible.

Soon thereafter, Schoenberg "was approached by Brian Carr, who was Keith Jarrett's manager, but declined signing with him, later signing with Ted Kurland Associates in 1985." Kurland's roster at the time included Chick Corea, Sonny Rollins, and Pat Metheny. Six months after signing, Schoenberg tore ligaments in the fifth finger of his right hand and his career came to a sudden end. It was during the next three years that he started scoring documentary films for networks including PBS, BBC, and HBO. He performed other concerts in 1990 and 1994, but because of the chronic injury, his improvisational process became compromised and he stopped performing for years, turning toward composing for musical theater, film scores, and children's music.

=== 2000– ===
In 2005, Steven and Jane Schoenberg were asked by Target Corporation to participate in the company's 2005 children's book tour to present a stage show featuring songs from their newly recorded My Bodyworks CD. The songs teach young children about their bodies and health awareness. The Schoenbergs published the songs as a book, also called My Bodyworks. It reached Number 9 on Amazon's Top 100 bestsellers in August 2005. Author Eric Carle described My Bodyworks as "a splendid book for all the senses... the illustrations are lively and delightful," while author Jane Yolen called the book, "a delicious combination of talents: lyrics, music, and facts all together."

After years of physical therapy, Schoenberg returned to the stage to record his third album, Steven Schoenberg Live: An Improvisational Journey (Quabbin 1003). The concert was recorded at Sweeney Hall, Smith College, Northampton, Massachusetts, and released in 2009. It was reviewed in Jazz Weekly, All About Jazz, and Stereophile, where the magazine's music editor wrote:

He dodges. He weaves. He's playful. He's dissonant. He evokes a range of American piano music and pianists, from Fess to Fats. He plays stride. He plays blues. He never allows his ideas to trap him in corners that he can't think and/or play his way out of. Refined, graceful, charming—all describe what composer-pianist Steven Schoenberg evokes on this impressive live set.

Schoenberg's latest album, 2014's Christmas Reimagined, features his improvisational style around classic holiday songs and carols. Recorded in Los Angeles at Sonic Veil studios, it is Schoenberg's first album not to appear on Quabbin Records. A review in All About Jazz calls the album, "a collection of refined miniatures played with grace and humor."

== Composer for award-winning projects ==
Read-A-Loud Rhymes For The Very Young:

- Knopf Book and Cassette Classic, published by Alfred A. Knopf. Parents' Choice Award Honor. Composer and producer of music under narration of poems (1988).

Can the Vatican Save the Sistine Chapel:

- Emmy Award for Outstanding Historical, Cultural, or Informational Programming. NOVA/PBS (1988).

Babar And Father Christmas:

- Parents' Choice Award, 1990. Random House book and cassette, Narrated by Peter Ustinov. Published by Random House, Inc. Composer and producer of piano music under narration (1989).

The Hermitage: A Russian Odyssey:

- Emmy Award nomination, 1995, for Outstanding Historical, Cultural, or Informational Programming, BBC/PBS (1994).

An Act of Conscience:

- Sundance Film Festival Nominee, Cinemax (1996).

People's Century: God Fights Back:

- International Emmy Award Winner, BBC/PBS (1998).

Farmingville:

- Sundance Special Jury Award, POV/PBS (2004).

My Bodyworks:

- National Science Teachers' Association and Children's Book Council (NSTA-CBC) Outstanding Science Trade Book selection for 2006.
- 2006 Kid's Radio Mania Family Favorite Awards, Best Album, 1st Place Award.
- Parents' Choice Recommended Award (2005).
- 2005 Children's Music Web Award Winner, Best Educational Recording for Young Children.
- Honorable Mention, 2005 International Songwriting Competition, Best Children's Music Category.
- Best Children's Books of 2006, Bank Street College.
- Featured on Weekend Edition with Scott Simon, NPR.

Kid Quest:

- Winner, New England Emmy Awards for Best Director and Outstanding Children's Program; Best Music Composition/Arrangement nominee. (Executive producer, music director, and composer) (2007).
- Parents' Choice Gold Award, Spring 2008 Television.

A Class Apart:

- Best Documentary/Television, The Imagen Award, PBS (2009).

Monica & David:

- Best Documentary Feature, 2010 Tribeca Film Festival. HBO (2009).

Graceland:

- Tribeca Film Festival, Nominee (2012).
- San Diego Asian Film Festival, Jury Award Winner (2012).

== Selected additional recordings ==
- "Love Flowers Prophecy," recorded by Godiego, from Dead End, Columbia Records YZ-5001-2-AX (1977); and Magic Capsule Live, Columbia YX-7192-AX (1979). Lyrics by Tommy Snyder.
- Numerous songs for Sesame Street, including "The Snuffleupagous Waltz" and "It Hurts Me to be Angry" (1977–1999).
- "Wes Jones The Flower Boy," recorded by Godiego, from Magic Capsule Live. Columbia YX-7192-AX (1979). Lyrics by Tommy Snyder.
- "It Takes Two To Make One," recorded by Rosenshontz, from Tickles You, RS 80-01 (1980). Lyrics by Gary Rosen.
- "Noses," recorded by Rosenshontz, from Tickles You, RS 80-01 (1980). Lyrics by Raymond Dutch.
- "Gypsy," recorded by Tommy Snyder, from There Comes A Time, Columbia AZ-7247-AX (1980). Lyrics by Tommy Snyder.
- "Now That Winter's Gone," recorded by the Coyote Sisters, from Women and Other Visions, Wannadale Records (2001). Lyrics by Marty Gwinn Townsend.
- "Lullaby & Fantasy for Guitar," recorded by Rob Phelps, Gasparo Records GG-1025 (2006).

== Selected contemporary classical compositions ==
- Song For Elvira, for full chorus, from the poem, Elvira de Alvear, by Jorge Luis Borges, premiered and performed by the Hartt College Chorus, Hartford, Connecticut (1976).
- Impressions From The Quabbin, for orchestra. Commissioned by the Holyoke Civic Orchestra, premiered at Holyoke Community College (1980).
- Three Movements For Flute, Violin, Viola, & Harp, premiered at the Mohawk Trail Concerts. Performed live on Morning Pro Musica, hosted by Robert J. Lurtsema (1982).
- Capriccio in C, for wind ensemble. Premiered and commissioned by Longmeadow (MA) High School Music Department (1983).
- String Quartet In Two Movements (1992–1994), Premiered Sage Hall, Smith College (1994).
- Four Songs, selected poems of Joseph Langland, for lyric baritone & piano (1993). Premiered Sage Hall, Smith College (1994).
- Traveler, for concert choir. Premiered and commissioned by the Northfield Mount Hermon School Concert choir. Text by Jane Schoenberg and Kahlil Gibran (1995).
- Lullaby and Fantasy, for classical guitar, premiered at Museum of Fine Arts, Springfield, Massachusetts (2001).
- Reflections, for clarinet, violincello, and piano. Premiered at the 1794 Meeting House Concert Series. New Salem, Massachusetts (2005).

== Influences ==
Johann Sebastian Bach, Ludwig van Beethoven, Igor Stravinsky, Muddy Waters, The Beatles, Cream.
