= Lillis =

Lillis may refer to:

== People ==
- Stefan Åkesson, Swedish skateboarder

=== Surname ===
- Bob Lillis (born 1930), American baseball player
- Jason Lillis (born 1969), English footballer
- Josh Lillis (born 1987), English footballer
- Mark Lillis (born 1960), English footballer
- Rachael Lillis (1969-2024), American actress
- Sophia Lillis (born 2002), American actress
- Stephen Lillis (born 1986), Irish hurler
- Thomas Francis Lillis (1861–1938), American Roman Catholic prelate

== Places ==
- Lillis, Kansas
- Lillis Business Complex, on the University of Oregon campus

== See also ==
- Lilli (disambiguation)
