= Lilli (comic strip) =

West German comic strip

- Author: Reinhard Beuthien
- Current status/schedule: Ended
- Launch date: 24 June 1952
- End date: 5 January 1961
- Alternate name: Bild-Lilli
- Publisher: Bild
- Original language: German

Lilli, also known as Bild-Lilli, is a discontinued West German comic strip created by Reinhard Beuthien for the tabloid newspaper Bild, appearing there from 1952 to 1961.

The toy company Greiner & Hausser Gmbh released a fashion doll line of the same name in 1955, which led Ruth Handler, the co-founder of American toy company Mattel, to launch a similar toyline named Barbie. Mattel acquired the rights to Lilli in 1964, and all the promotional and merchandising activities related to the character were discontinued since then.

== History ==
Ordered to draw a "filler" cartoon for the 24 June 1952, inaugural issue of Bild, Reinhard Beuthien drew an unruly baby making a mess in her house; his editor disliked it, so he adapted the drawing into a sexy pony-tailed blonde sitting in a fortune-teller's tent. She was asking, "Can't you give me the name and address of this tall, handsome, rich man?" The cartoon was an immediate success and became a daily feature.

Lilli was post-war, sassy, and ambitious, "a golddigger, exhibitionist, and floozy". The cartoon always consisted of a picture of Lilli talking, while dressed or undressed in a manner that showed her figure, usually to girlfriends, boyfriends, or her boss. To a policeman who told her that two-piece swimsuits are banned in the street: "Oh, and in your opinion, what part should I take off?" The last Lilli cartoon appeared on 5 January 1961.

== Adaptation and merchandises ==
=== Film ===
A film about Lilli was released in Germany in 1958: Lilli – ein Mädchen aus der Großstadt (Lilli, a Girl From the Big City), a comedy-mystery directed by Hermann Leitner. A contest was held to choose the star; the winner was the Danish actress Ann Smyrner.

=== Fashion dolls ===
In 1953, Bild decided to market a Lilli doll and contacted Max Weissbrodt of the toy company O&M Hausser in Neustadt bei Coburg. Weissbrodt designed a prototype doll based on Beuthien's cartoons, which was sold from 1955 to 1964; that year Mattel acquired the rights to the doll and German production stopped. Approximately 130,000 were produced.

== Acquisition by Mattel and discontinuation ==
Louis Marx and Company acquired the rights to the Bild Lilli doll from Hausser and sold Miss Seventeen and smaller Miss Marlene dolls. Mattel had bought all patents and copyrights to the Bild Lilli doll so that using that name as a book title or product name would infringe copyright laws. Marx unsuccessfully attempted to sue Mattel for patent infringement.

== Related characters ==
In 1962, Beuthien created another cartoon character called "Schwabinchen" for a Bavarian newspaper, but it was not as successful as Lilli and the dolls inspired by her were of poor quality. Later he started "Gigi", who had even less success and never became a doll.
