= Lilley =

Lilley may refer to:

== Surname ==
- Charles Lilley (1827–1897), chief justice in Queensland
- Chris Lilley (comedian) (born 1974), Australian comedian
- Chris Lilley (computer scientist) (born 1959), British computer scientist
- David Lilley (born 1977), Scottish footballer
- Dick Lilley (1866–1929), English cricketer
- George L. Lilley (1859–1909), U.S. Congressman and Governor
- James R. Lilley (1928–2009), U.S. diplomat
- Jemma Lilley (born 1991), English crime fiction writer and murderer
- Jen Lilley (born 1984), American actress and singer
- Jordan Lilley (born 1996), English rugby league footballer
- Madison Lilley (born 1999), American volleyball player
- Mial Eben Lilley (1850–1915), U.S. Congressman
- Peter Lilley (born 1943), British politician
- Ruby Lilley (born 2006), American skateboarder
- Taylor Lilley (born 1988), American basketball player
- Valerie Lilley (born 1939), Northern Irish actress

== Places ==
- Division of Lilley, an electoral division in Queensland, Australia
- Lilley, Berkshire, a location in the U.K.
- Lilley, Hertfordshire, England
- Lilley Township, Michigan, USA

== See also ==
- Lili (disambiguation)
- Lille (disambiguation)
- Lilli (disambiguation)
- Lillie (disambiguation)
- Lilly (disambiguation)
- Lily (disambiguation)
