= Lilly Historic District =

Historic district in Georgia, United States

- U.S. National Register of Historic Places
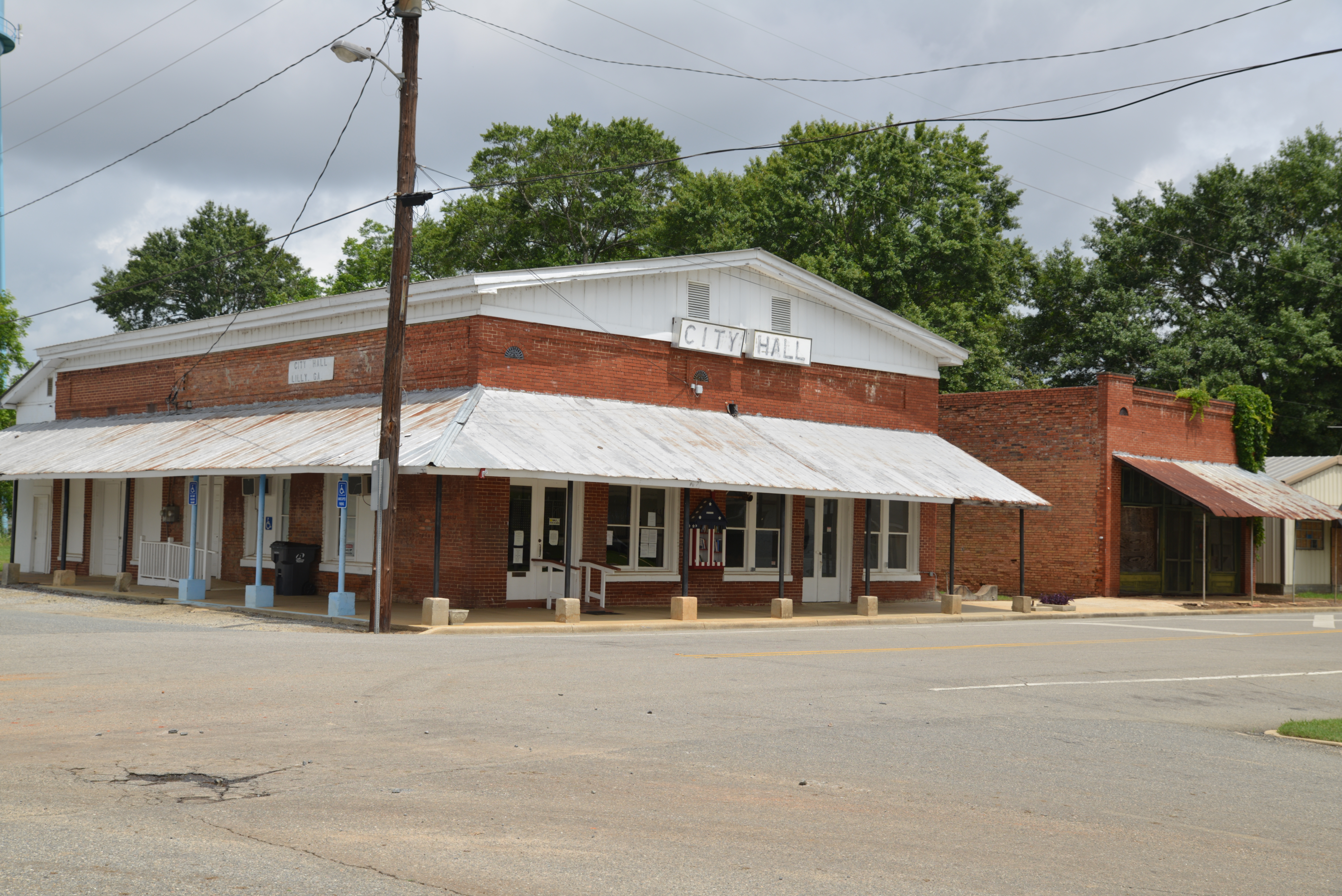

- Location within Georgia
- Location: Roughly bounded by CSX RR tracks, and Church, Montezuma, Third, and School Sts., Lilly, Georgia
- Coordinates: 32°08′54″N 83°52′41″W
- Area: 60 acres (24 ha)
- Built: 1902
- Architect: Busby, Perry G.
- Architectural style: Mid 19th Century Revival, Late Victorian, Late 19th And 20th Century Revivals
- NRHP reference No.: 97001558
- Added to NRHP: January 5, 1998

The Lilly Historic District in Lilly, Georgia is a 60 acres (24 ha) historic district which was listed on the National Register of Historic Places in 1998. Roughly bounded by the CSX RR tracks, and Church, Montezuma, Third, and School Streets, it included 29 contributing buildings, two contributing structures, and a contributing site. It also includes 11 non-contributing buildings and a non-contributing structure.
