= Lille Storberg =

Norwegian handball player

Personal information
- Full name: Anne Kristine «Lille» Storberg
- Nationality: Norwegian
- Born: 30 January 1945 (age 81) Kongsvinger, Norway

Sport
- Sport: Handball

Senior clubs
- Years: Team
- –: Brandval Idrettslag
National team
Years	Team	Apps	(Gls)
1965–1971	Norway	55	(47)

Anne Kristine «Lille» Storberg (née Børresen, 30 January 1945) is a Norwegian handball player. She played 55 matches for the Norway women's national handball team between 1965 and 1971. She participated at the 1971 World Women's Handball Championship, where the Norwegian team was placed 7th.

She played for Brandval Idrettslag, where she won the Norwegian indoor Championship in 1967 and both the indoor and outdoor championship in 1969. In 1967 and 1970 she won the Norwegian Women's Handball League with Brandval Idrettslag, in 1968 she won a bronze medal and in 1970 she won a silver medal. She also won the Outdoor Norwegian championship in 1969 and 1972.

Her sister, Astrid Børresen, was also a handball player for Brandval Idrettslag.
