= Lily Lake (Nova Scotia) =

Lily Lake (Nova Scotia) could be any one of the following:

== Annapolis County ==
- Lily Lake located at 44°34′58″N 65°24′28″W
- Lily Lake located at 44°44′1″N 64°51′2″W
- Lily Lake located at 44°58′23″N 65°6′39″W

== Cape Breton Regional Municipality ==
- Lily Lake located at 45°53′44″N 60°16′53″W
- Lily Lake located at 46°0′44″N 60°21′46″W
- Lily Lake located at 46°13′0″N 60°16′0″W

== Guysborough County ==
- Lily Lake located at 45°10′36″N 61°29′17″W
- Lily Lake located at 45°10′50″N 61°48′45″W
- Lily Lake located at 45°19′59″N 61°14′18″W
- Lily Lake located at 45°19′48″N 61°44′8″W
- Lily Lake located at 45°19′50″N 61°50′6″W

== Halifax Regional Municipality ==
- Lily Lake located at 44°40′9″N 63°59′26″W
- Lily Lake located at 44°44′34″N 63°38′13″W
- Lily Lakes located at 44°52′13″N 62°25′59″W

== Hants County ==
- Lily Lake located at 44°55′1″N 63°53′43″W
- Lily Lake located at 45°4′52″N 64°5′15″W

== Kings County ==
- Lily Lake located at 44°51′31″N 64°52′34″W
- Lily Lake located at 44°54′5″N 64°53′27″W

== Region of Queens Municipality ==
- Lily Lake located at 43°50′45″N 64°50′55″W

== Yarmouth County ==
- Lily Lake located at 43°52′14″N 66°4′30″W

== River ==
- Lily Lake Brook in Annapolis County at 44°56′0″N 65°3′57″W
