= Delphine Dryden =

American author

- Born: Delphine Dryden; December 1, 1967 (age 58)
- Occupation: American Author
- Known for: Award-Winning Novels

Delphine Dryden (born December 1, 1967) is an American author of contemporary romance, erotic romance and steampunk romance fiction.

== Career ==
Dryden was first published in 2008 and has since published over twenty novels and novellas . She currently writes for Berkley Publishing and Harlequin (Carina Press and Cosmo Red Hot Reads from Harlequin). Dryden's work, in particular the award-winning novel The Theory of Attraction, has frequently been cited as an example of nerd romance Dryden has also received critical praise for her steampunk novels. Dryden has been a speaker at events such as the Romantic Times Booklovers Convention, the Romance Writers of America National Conference, and Comicpalooza. Dryden is also a founding member of and regular contributor to the romance, writing and culture blog Wonkomance.com.

== Personal life ==
Dryden currently lives near her hometown of Houston, Texas.

== Honors ==
- 2012 Romantic Times Magazine July Seal of Excellence Winner (The Theory of Attraction)
- 2012 Romantic Times Magazine Reviewers’ Choice Award Winner (The Theory of Attraction)
- 2012 Colorado Romance Writers Award of Excellence Winner (The Theory of Attraction)
- 2013 Phoenix Romance Writers Golden Quill Contest Finalist (The Theory of Attraction)
- 2013 EPIC (Electronic Publishing Industry Coalition) Ebook Award Winner (Love With a Chance of Zombies)
- 2013 EPIC (Electronic Publishing Industry Coalition) Ebook Award Finalist (The Lamplighter's Love)
- 2013 Romantic Times Magazine Reviewers’ Choice Award Nominee (The Seduction Hypothesis)

== Bibliography ==
The Science of Temptation series (Carina Press):

- The Theory of Attraction (January 2012)
- The Seduction Hypothesis (May 2013)
- The Principle of Desire (December 2013)

The Steam and Seduction series (Berkley Sensation):

- Gossamer Wing (November 2013)
- Scarlet Devices (February 2014)
- Gilded Lily (July 2014)

The Tropical Trysts series (Cosmo Red Hot Reads from Harlequin):

- Mai Tai for Two (May 2014)
- Sex on the Beach (July 2014)

The Truth and Lies series (Ellora's Cave):

- How to Tell a Lie (November 2009)
- Art of the Lie (September 2010)
- Naked Truth (October 2010)
- Tangled Truth (June 2011)
- Tell Me No Lies (November 2012)

Other Titles (Ellora's Cave):

- Snow Job (November 2008)
- When in Rio (February 2009)
- Xmas Spark (December 2010)
- Roses and Chains (April 2011)
- The Lamplighter's Love (September 2011)
- Love With a Chance of Zombies (September 2011)
- Toy Box (September 2012)
- Intermezzo (March 2013)
