= List of storms named Lily =

The name Lily or Lilly has been used for six tropical cyclones worldwide.

In the Eastern Pacific Ocean:

- Hurricane Lily (1967)
- Hurricane Lily (1971)
- Hurricane Lily (1975)

In the Western Pacific Ocean:

- Typhoon Lilly (1946)

In the Australian region:

- Cyclone Lily (1977)

In the South-West Indian Ocean:

- Tropical Depression Lily (1966)
