= Lily Lake (Florida) =

- Location within Florida Location within the United States
- Location: southern Polk County, Florida
- Coordinates: 27.43°N 81.34°W
- Type: manmade dredged freshwater lake
- Basin countries: United States
- Max. length: 1,250 feet (380 m)
- Max. width: 355 feet (108 m)
- Surface elevation: 138 feet (42 m)

Lily Lake is a somewhat rectangular lake with a small cove on its western side. Situated within the Lily Lake Golf Resort, a private retirement golf community along US Highway 27, the lake is located approximately 2 miles (3,200 m) southwest of Frostproof, Florida. The surface area of the Lily Lake community encompasses 9.78-acre (39,600 m^{2}).

This lake is man-made, potentially resulting from dredged or excavated. It has part of the Resort community's nine-hole golf course along part of its shore. It also has some park benches and paved walking trails along its shore.

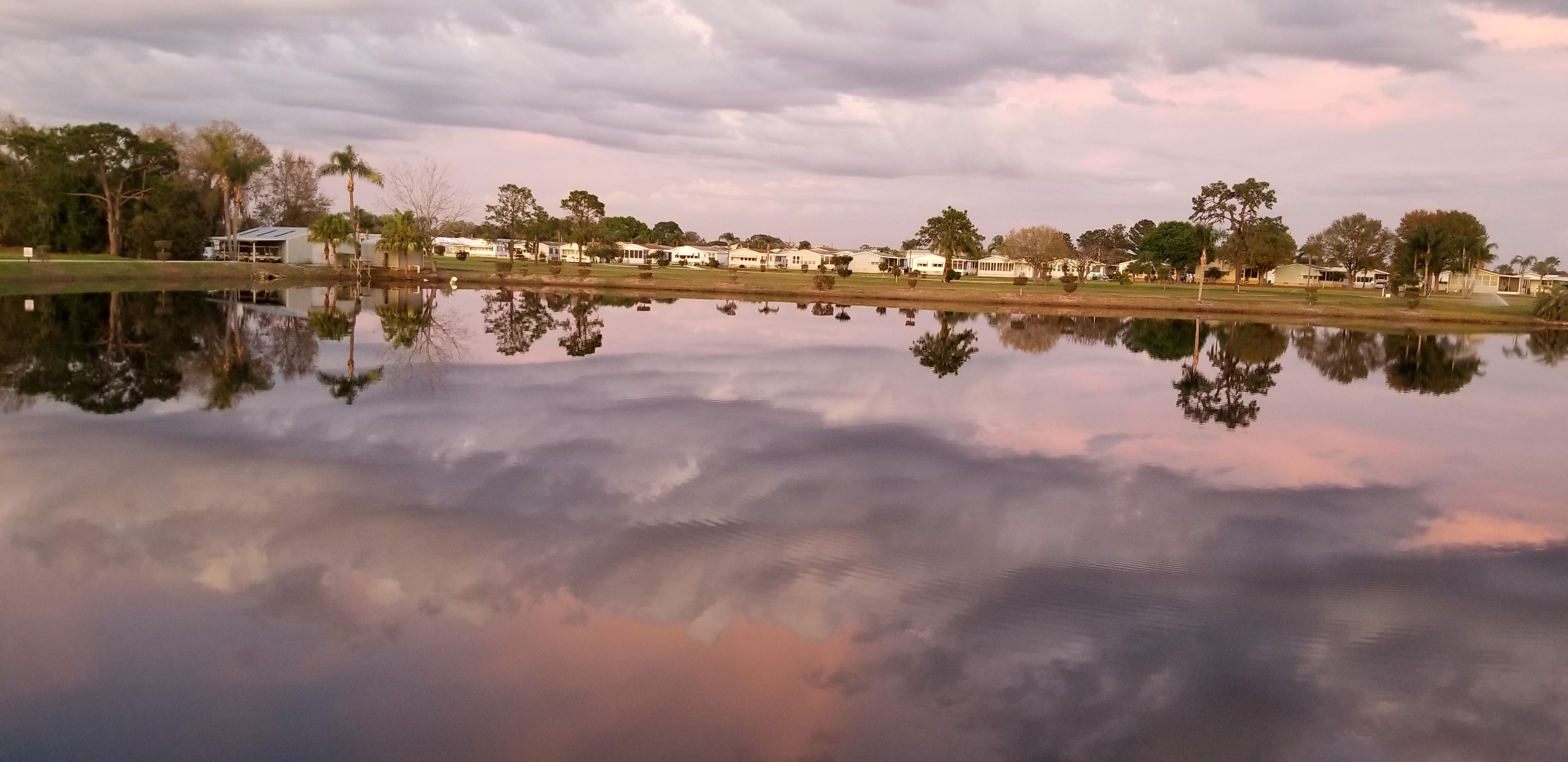
Lily Lake within the Lily Lake Golf Resort

The community consists of 423 lot sites, most of which contain privately owned (manufactured) homes, although some are serviced lots for large RV's, also privately owned. During daytime hours, the gate to Lily Lake Golf Resort is open, since the public is invited to golf, for a fee. The community's affairs are overseen by the Lily Lake Property Owners Association, the governing body. The official address of Lily Lake Golf Resort is 6603 US Highway 27, Frostproof, FL 33843.
