= Lilly Prize =

The Lilly Prize may refer to:

- Ruth Lilly Poetry Prize
- Eli Lilly Award in Biological Chemistry
- Lilly Medal for animal conservation
