= Lily Pond =

Lily Pond may refer to:

- Lily Pond, a lake in Nova Scotia, Canada
- Lily Pond, Georgia, an unincorporated community in the United States
- Lily Pond Avenue, an artery in the New York City borough of Staten Island
- Triplicane or Thiruvallikeni (lit. 'Lily Pond'), a neighborhood of Chennai, India

== See also ==
- LilyPond, music software
- Lily Lake (disambiguation)
- Prankers Pond, in Saugus, Massachusetts, also known as Lily Pond
- Water Lilies (Monet series), of which several include "Lily Pond" in their title
