= 1092 Lilium =

Carbonaceous background asteroid

Discovery
- Discovered by: K. Reinmuth
- Discovery site: Heidelberg Obs.
- Discovery date: 12 January 1924

Designations
- Pronunciation: /ˈlɪliəm/
- Named after: Līlium (flowering plant)
- Alternative designations: 1924 PN · 1929 BE; 1936 QE
- Minor planet category: main-belt · (outer) background

Orbital characteristics
- Epoch 4 September 2017 (JD 2458000.5)
- Uncertainty parameter 0
- Observation arc: 110.67 yr (40,421 days)
- Aphelion: 3.1444 AU
- Perihelion: 2.6552 AU
- Semi-major axis: 2.8998 AU
- Eccentricity: 0.0843
- Orbital period (sidereal): 4.94 yr (1,804 days)
- Mean anomaly: 200.62°
- Mean motion: 0° 11^{m} 58.56^{s} / day
- Inclination: 5.3885°
- Longitude of ascending node: 307.49°
- Argument of perihelion: 316.51°

Physical characteristics
- Dimensions: 37.78±12.75 km 40.276±0.243 km 42.853±0.266 km 43.23±0.33 km 46.17±1.5 km 49.56±13.84 km 52.79±0.87 km
- Synodic rotation period: 17.63 h 24.60±0.05 h (Note: Lightcurve plot of 1092 Lilium, Palmer Divide Observatory, Brian D. Warner (2008) Summary figures at the LCDB)
- Geometric albedo: 0.030±0.001; 0.0390±0.003; 0.04±0.02; 0.044±0.005; 0.0452±0.0071; 0.05±0.03
- Spectral type: C (assumed); B–V = 0.840; U–B = 0.330
- Absolute magnitude (H): 10.82; 10.90±0.28 · 10.97

1092 Lilium, provisional designation 1924 PN, is a dark, carbonaceous background asteroid from the outer regions of the asteroid belt, approximately 44 kilometers in diameter. It was discovered on 12 January 1924, by German astronomer Karl Reinmuth at the Heidelberg Observatory in southwest Germany. The asteroid was named after the flower Lilium (true lily).

== Orbit and classification ==
Lilium is a non-family asteroid from the main belt's background population. It orbits the Sun in the outer asteroid belt at a distance of 2.7–3.1 AU once every 4 years and 11 months (1,804 days). Its orbit has an eccentricity of 0.08 and an inclination of 5° with respect to the ecliptic.

The body's observation arc begins with a precovery image taken at the Lowell Observatory in July 1906, almost 18 years prior to its official discovery observation at Heidelberg.

== Physical characteristics ==
Lilium is an assumed carbonaceous C-type asteroid.

=== Rotation period ===
In February 2008, a rotational lightcurve of Lilium was obtained from photometric observations by American astronomer Brian Warner at his Palmer Divide Observatory (716) in Colorado. Lightcurve analysis gave a longer-than average rotation period of 24.60 hours with a brightness amplitude of 0.25 magnitude (U=3), superseding a period of 17.63 hours by Richard Binzel from March 1984 (U=1).

=== Diameter and albedo ===
According to the surveys carried out by the Infrared Astronomical Satellite IRAS, the Japanese Akari satellite and the NEOWISE mission of NASA's Wide-field Infrared Survey Explorer, Lilium measures between 37.78 and 52.79 kilometers in diameter and its surface has an albedo between 0.030 and 0.05.

The Collaborative Asteroid Lightcurve Link adopts the results obtained by IRAS, that is, an albedo of 0.0390 and a diameter of 46.17 kilometers based on an absolute magnitude of 10.82.

== Naming ==
This minor planet was named by the discoverer after the true lily flowering planet, Lilium. The official naming citation was mentioned in The Names of the Minor Planets by Paul Herget in 1955 (H 103).

=== Reinmuth's flowers ===
Due to his many discoveries, Karl Reinmuth submitted a large list of 66 newly named asteroids in the early 1930s. The list covered his discoveries, with numbers between (1009) and (1200). This list also contained a sequence of 28 asteroids, starting with 1054 Forsytia, that were all named after plants, in particular flowering plants (also see list of minor planets named after animals and plants).
