= Bild Lilli doll =

Discontinued West German fashion doll line

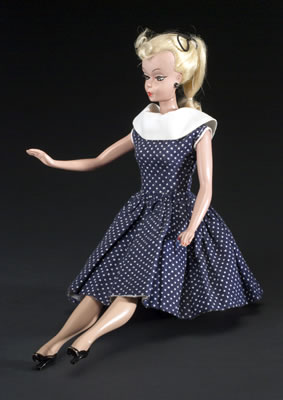
- A Bild Lilli doll
- Type: Doll/Action figure
- Invented by: Max Weissbrodt
- Company: Greiner & Hausser GmbH
- Country: West Germany
- Availability: 12 August 1955–1964

The Bild Lilli doll was a West German line of fashion doll launched by Greiner & Hausser GmbH on August 12, 1955 and produced until 1964. Its design was based on the comic-strip character Lilli, created by Reinhard Beuthien for the tabloid newspaper Bild. The doll was made of polystyrene, came in two sizes, and had an available wardrobe of 1950s fashion. The Lilli doll was copied, and altered to some degree, for Mattel upon the direction of that company's co-founder, Ruth Handler. Mattel acquired the rights to Bild Lilli in 1964, and production of the German doll ceased in favor of Mattel's new vinyl doll, which they called Barbie.

== History ==
Lilli was a German cartoon character created by Reinhard Beuthien for the German tabloid Bild. In 1953, the newspaper decided to market a Lilli doll and contacted Max Weissbrodt of the toy company O&M Hausser in Neustadt bei Coburg. Weissbrodt designed a prototype doll based on Beuthien's cartoons that was sold from 1955 to 1964; that year, Mattel acquired the rights to the doll and German production stopped.

Bild Lilli was available in two sizes: 30 and 19 cm (11.8 and 7.5 in). She held three patents, features absolutely new in doll-making: the head and neck were not one form connected with a seam at the shoulders, but rather the seam was mid-neck, behind the chin; the hair was not rooted, but a cut-out scalp that was attached by a hidden metal screw; the legs did not sprawl open when she was sitting. The doll was made of plastic and had molded eyelashes, pale skin, and a painted face with side glancing eyes, high narrow eyebrows, and red lips. Her fingernails were also painted red. She wore her hair in a ponytail with one curl on the forehead. Her shoes and earrings were molded on. Her limbs were attached inside by coated rubber bands. The cartoon Lilli was blonde, but a few of the dolls had other hair colours. Each Lilli doll carried a miniature copy of Bild and was sold in a clear plastic tube, with the doll's feet fitted into the base of a stand labelled "Bild-Lilli" that formed the bottom of the tube; the packaging was designed by E. Martha Maar, the mother-in-law of the Hausser company owner.

Originally the tall dolls cost DM 12, the small DM 7.50 at a time when average monthly take-home pay was DM 200 to DM 400. As this price suggests, the dolls were marketed to adults, mainly men, as a joke or gag gift at tobacconists, kiosks, and newsagents that normally sold flowers, chocolates, and other small giftware. A German brochure from the 1950s states that Lilli was "always discreet", and that her wardrobe made her "the star of every bar", and an advertisement from the 1960s encouraged young men to give their girlfriends a Lilli doll as a gift rather than flowers. (This latter ad was then referenced by a Lilli newspaper cartoon, where Lilli says to her boyfriend: "I found it so apt that you gave me a Lilli doll as a present – now, I've a similarly suitable present for you" while presenting him with a puppet).

A total of 130,000 were made. The doll eventually became popular with children as well. Dollhouses, room settings, furniture, and other toy accessories to scale with the small Lilli were produced by German toy factories to cash in on her popularity amongst children and parents.

Lilli came as a dressed doll; additional fashions were sold separately. Her fashions, mostly also designed by Maar, mirror the lifestyle of the 1950s: She had outfits for parties, the beach, and tennis, as well as cotton dresses, pajamas and poplin suits. In her last years, her wardrobe consisted mainly of traditional "dirndl" dresses. Lilli's dresses always have patent fasteners marked "PRYM".

Lilli and her fashions were sold as children's toys in several European countries, including Italy and Scandinavian countries; outside Germany she is usually remembered as a children's doll. In the United States, she was just called "Lilli". Some Lillis have been seen in original 1950s packaging for an English-speaking market labelled "Lili Marleen", after the song.

== Imitations and Barbie ==
Several toy companies (mainly in Hong Kong) produced dolls resembling Bild Lilli, some from purchased original molds. In Spain, Muñecas FEJ (Guillen y Vicedo) copied the molds and made a very similar doll, but with darker skin, white earrings, and articulated waist. However, Spanish society was extremely conservative at the time and was not ready for such "offensive" dolls. Mothers were not buying them for their daughters and the manufacturer had to retire them from the market.

Mattel's Barbie doll, which appeared in March 1959, was based on Bild Lilli dolls that co-founder Ruth Handler had acquired in Hamburg. The first Barbie doll was made of vinyl instead of hard plastic, had rooted hair with curly bangs rather than a wig-cap, and included separate shoes and earrings which were not molded on as Lilli's were. However, apart from these differences, the earliest Barbie dolls were in many ways quite similar to Lilli in overall shape and appearance.

Louis Marx and Company acquired the rights to the Bild Lilli doll from Hausser and sold Miss Seventeen and smaller Miss Marlene dolls. Mattel had bought all patents and copyrights to the Bild Lilli doll so that using that name as a book title or product name would infringe copyright laws. Marx unsuccessfully attempted to sue Mattel for patent infringement.

== Legacy ==
Lilli has been a collector's piece. In the Coburg Doll Museum, over 1,000 historic dolls are displayed, including the Lilli doll, the "grandmother" of the world-famous Barbie.
