= Lily Lake (Blue Earth County, Minnesota) =

Lake in the state of Minnesota, United States

- Location within Minnesota
- Location: Blue Earth County, Minnesota
- Coordinates: 44°6′52″N 94°13′22″W
- Type: lake

Lily Lake is a lake in Blue Earth County, Minnesota, in the United States.

Lily Lake was named for the water lilies in the lake.

== See also ==
- List of lakes in Minnesota
