= Lily Lake (Washington County, Minnesota) =

Lake in the state of Minnesota, United States

Lilly Lake
- Location within Minnesota Location within the United States
- Location: Stillwater, Minnesota
- Coordinates: 45.0483°N 92.8233°W
- Type: natural freshwater lake
- Basin countries: United States
- Max. length: northern section 2,190 feet (670 m)
- Max. width: northern section 1,200 feet (370 m)
- Surface area: 41 acres (17 ha)
- Max. depth: 51 feet (16 m)
- Surface elevation: 840 feet (260 m)

Lily Lake is a lake in Washington County, in the U.S. state of Minnesota.

Lily Lake was named for its abundance of white waterlilies.

== Naegleria fowleri ==
Two swimmers have died from Naegleria fowleri infection. The first death was in 2010, followed by a second case of primary amoebic meningoencephalitis in 2012. These are the northernmost cases in the United States of this infection.

== See also ==
- List of lakes in Minnesota
