= Lilli (1958 film) =

1958 film by Hermann Leitner

- Directed by: Hermann Leitner
- Written by: Louis Martin; Claude Desailly; Reinhard Beuthin; Peter Dronte; Ulrich Pickardt
- Produced by: Helmuth Volmer
- Starring: Adrian Hoven; Ann Smyrner; Claude Farell
- Cinematography: Kurt Grigoleit
- Edited by: Walter Boos
- Music by: Michael Jary
- Production company: Arca-Filmproduktion
- Distributed by: Neue Filmverleih
- Release date: 6 March 1958
- Running time: 87 minutes
- Country: West Germany
- Language: German

Lilli (German: Lilli - ein Mädchen aus der Großstadt) is a 1958 West German comedy crime film directed by Hermann Leitner and starring Adrian Hoven, Ann Smyrner and Claude Farell. It is based on the comic strip Lilli that appeared in the German tabloid newspaper Bild at the time. It was shot at the Arca Studios in West Berlin. The film's sets were designed by the art directors Hans Auffenberg and Gabriel Pellon.

== Cast ==
- Adrian Hoven as Bill Morton
- Ann Smyrner as Lilli
- Claude Farell as Kira
- Werner Peters as Referent Kinker
- Friedrich Joloff as Christobal Ramirez
- Rudolf Platte as Polizeioffizier
- Günther Lüders as Portier
- Siegfried Schürenberg as Albrecht Martens
- Matthias Grimm as Lorenzo
- Stanislav Ledinek as Gangster Peppino
- Edward Tierney as Gangster Mario
- Hans Schwarz Jr. as Kräftiger Matrose
- Fritz Wagner as Hänschen
- Tilo von Berlepsch as Schiffarzt
- Ah Yue Lou as Schiffskellner
- Kurt Pratsch-Kaufmann as Wachtmeister Brauer
- Werner Stock as Autofahrer
- Bruno W. Pantel as Lillis Kollege
- Hans Stiebner as Gangster Adolpho
- Panos Papadopulos as Gangster Joe
- Yvonne Carré as Sängerin
- Udo Jürgens as Matrose Benno

== Bibliography ==
- Bock, Hans-Michael & Bergfelder, Tim. The Concise CineGraph. Encyclopedia of German Cinema. Berghahn Books, 2009.
- Neumann, Andreas & Petzel, Michael. Sir John jagt den Hexer: Siegfried Schürenberg und die Edgar-Wallace-Filme. Schwarzkopf & Schwarzkopf, 2005.
