= Lilly, Georgia =

- City
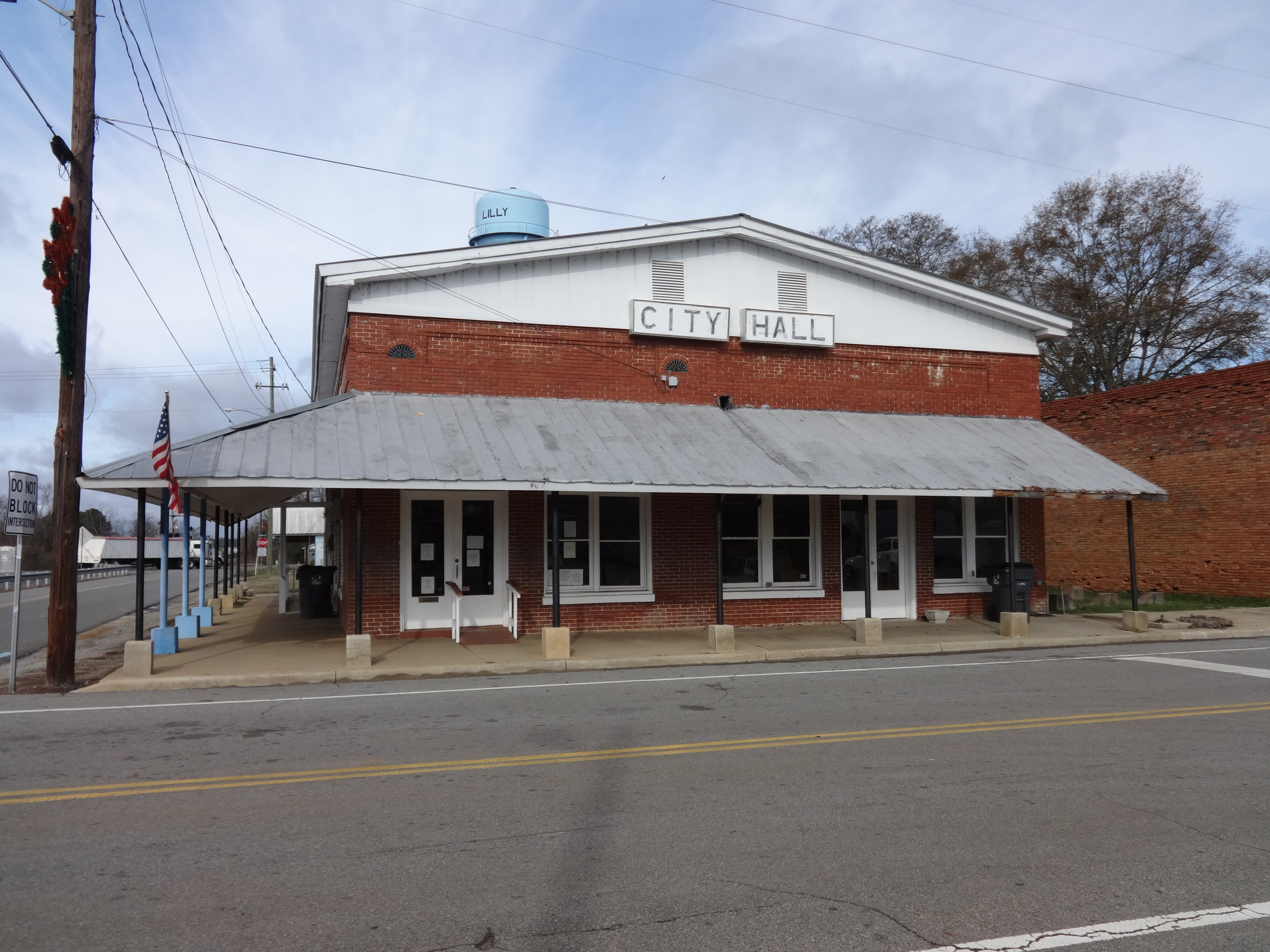
- Lilly City Hall

- Location in Dooly County and the state of Georgia
- Coordinates: 32°8′50″N 83°52′40″W
- Country: United States
- State: Georgia
- County: Dooly

Government
  - Type: Mayor-council government
  - Mayor: Paula Coleman
  - Lilly City Council: Members: Alonzo Daniels; Frankie Daniels; George Royal; Vernon Singley

Area
  - Total: 0.60 sq mi (1.56 km^{2})
  - Land: 0.60 sq mi (1.56 km^{2})
  - Water: 0 sq mi (0.00 km^{2})
- Elevation: 348 ft (106 m)

Population (2020)
  - Total: 129
  - Density: 214.3/sq mi (82.74/km^{2})
- Time zone: UTC-5 (Eastern (EST))
  - Summer (DST): UTC-4 (EDT)
- ZIP code: 31051
- Area code: 229
- FIPS code: 13-46384
- GNIS feature ID: 0332214

Lilly is a city in Dooly County, Georgia, United States. As of the 2020 census, Lilly had a population of 129.

Lilly was originally named "Midway", as it was the halfway point between Cordele and Montezuma. The name was changed upon the discovery that there already was another Midway in the state. The name "Lilly" is a reference to patriarchs of the town.

== Geography ==
Lilly is located in west-central Dooly County at 32°8′50″N 83°52′40″W (32.147319, -83.877735). Georgia State Route 90 passes through the center of town, leading north 4 miles (6 km) to Byromville and southeast 7 miles (11 km) to Vienna.

According to the United States Census Bureau, Lilly has a total area of 0.6 square miles (1.6 km^{2}), all land.

== Demographics ==
Historical population
| Census | Pop. | Note | %± |
|---|---|---|---|
| 1910 | 221 | | — |
| 1920 | 258 | | 16.7% |
| 1930 | 242 | | −6.2% |
| 1940 | 214 | | −11.6% |
| 1950 | 177 | | −17.3% |
| 1960 | 136 | | −23.2% |
| 1970 | 155 | | 14.0% |
| 1980 | 202 | | 30.3% |
| 1990 | 138 | | −31.7% |
| 2000 | 221 | | 60.1% |
| 2010 | 213 | | −3.6% |
| 2020 | 129 | | −39.4% |
U.S. Decennial Census

As of the census of 2000, there were 221 people, 82 households, and 51 families residing in the city. The population density was 367.0 people per square mile (141.7 people/km^{2}). There were 93 housing units at an average density of 154.5 units per square mile (59.7 units/km^{2}). The racial makeup of the city was 52.49% White, 43.44% African American, 0.45% Asian, 3.17% from other races, and 0.45% from two or more races. Hispanic or Latino of any race were 3.17% of the population.

There were 82 households, out of which 40.2% had children under the age of 18 living with them, 32.9% were married couples living together, 24.4% had a female householder with no husband present, and 36.6% were non-families. 34.1% of all households were made up of individuals, and 14.6% had someone living alone who was 65 years of age or older. The average household size was 2.70 and the average family size was 3.50.

In the city, the population was spread out, with 36.7% under the age of 18, 10.4% from 18 to 24, 23.5% from 25 to 44, 17.2% from 45 to 64, and 12.2% who were 65 years of age or older. The median age was 27 years. For every 100 females, there were 92.2 males. For every 100 females age 18 and over, there were 64.7 males.

The median income for a household in the city was $27,639, and the median income for a family was $45,313. Males had a median income of $28,558 versus $25,000 for females. The per capita income for the city was $10,969. About 8.1% of families and 21.5% of the population were below the poverty line, including 32.4% of those under the age of eighteen and 16.7% of those 65 or over.
