= Lily: A Longitudinal View of Life with Down Syndrome =

Lily: A Longitudinal View of Life With Down Syndrome
- Directed by: Elizabeth Grace, Lily's mother
- Written by: Elizabeth Grace
- Produced by: Elizabeth Grace
- Starring: Lily
- Distributed by: Davidson Films
- Release dates: 1978; 1988; 1997
- Running time: 43 min.
- Country: United States
- Language: English

Lily: A Longitudinal View of Life With Down Syndrome is a three-part documentary that follows Lily, an individual with Down syndrome. The series shows her life over a period of 30 years, during which Lily attends elementary school, graduates from high school, and eventually lives independently.

== Lily: A Story About A Girl Like Me ==
Released in 1978, this is the first part in the series. Lily is documented in her third grade class and at home. During this time period, intellectually disabled children were not typically in public schools. This part in the series shows her adjusting to the differences she faces in the real world.

== Lily: A Sequel ==
Released in 1988, the second part of the series gives viewers a chance to see Lily's development. The camera follows the twenty-year-old as she graduates from high school as a class marshall and moves into a group home. She has a job at a restaurant and proves to be very adaptable.

== Lily at Thirty ==
Released in 1997, the final installation of the series shows Lily as a fully independent woman. She has moved into her own apartment and has a job at a grocery store. Viewers are able to see her day-to-day life and how she has grown into her own person.

== Themes ==
Independence
Lily learns to live on her own. After graduating, she moves into a group home and eventually into her own apartment as part of an independent living program. Lily seems to constantly strive toward her independence throughout the series. While in the group home, she says that while they are "like a family" she is eager to have her own space. Lily mentions that she can not wait to see what it is like in the "big world". Once she finally moves into her own place the audience can sense that she has reached her goal. The journey she takes to living on her own is filled with obstacles, yet she faces each one without fear. By moving into her own apartment, Lily is able to live as a normal citizen despite her differences.

Letting go
Lily's mother constantly expresses that it is hard for her to let Lily be on her own. Going to elementary school, moving into the group home, and moving into her own apartment are all times when Lily's mother has to force herself to let go and give Lily the independence she wants.

Adjusting to the world around you/ dealing with differences
The filming began in 1978, when children were quickly placed into institutions for lifelong care, as opposed to having a normal family life. Lily was "a pioneer for mainstreaming" and her story proves that the intellectually disabled are fully capable of learning, living, and thriving on their own. The film gives insights to the full life possible for the intellectually disabled.

Stereotypes
Lily breaks the mold of some people's concept of individuals with Down syndrome. She holds a job and is an important member of her community. She is able to live on her own and do everything a regular member of society can do. By inviting viewers into the details of her daily life, she proves that she is no different from anyone else.

== Awards ==
Lily: A Story About A Girl Like Me won the CINE Golden Eagle Award in 1978.
